= 2015 USA–Brazil Challenge =

Curling challenge

- Host city: Blaine, Minnesota
- Arena: Four Seasons Curling Club
- Dates: January 30 – February 1
- Winner: United States
- Skip: Heath McCormick
- Third: Chris Plys
- Second: Joe Polo
- Lead: Ryan Brunt
- Finalist: Brazil (Marcelo Mello)

The 2015 USA–Brazil Challenge (officially the Americas Challenge) was a curling challenge that took place from January 30 to February 1 at the Four Seasons Curling Club in Blaine, Minnesota. The challenge round was held to determine which nation will qualify to the last Americas Zone spot at the 2015 Ford World Men's Curling Championship in Halifax, Nova Scotia. Brazil and the United States played a best-of-five series with the United States skip Heath McCormick winning three games in a row to win the challenge.

== Background ==
The World Curling Federation allots two spots at the World Men's Curling Championship to the Americas Zone, which are normally taken by Canada and the United States. However, the World Curling Federation allows for other member nations in the Americas Zone (i.e. Brazil) to challenge Canada and/or the United States for berths to the World Championships. As hosts, Canada received an automatic berth to the 2015 World Championships. Thus, Brazil was allowed to challenge the United States for a berth to the 2015 World Championships. This was Brazil's third challenge of the United States, after challenges in 2009 and 2010 proved to be unsuccessful.

== Teams ==
The teams are listed as follows:

Nation	Skip	Third	Second	Lead	Alternate
Brazil	Marcelo Mello	Scott McMullan	Cesar Santos	Filipe Nunes	Raphael Monticello
United States	Heath McCormick	Chris Plys	Joe Polo	Ryan Brunt	Colin Hufman

== Results ==
=== Game 1 ===
Friday, January 30, 19:00

Team	1	2	3	4	5	6	7	8	9	10	Final
United States (McCormick)	1	0	1	0	0	1	0	4	0	X	7
Brazil (Mello)	0	0	0	0	1	0	1	0	1	X	3

=== Game 2 ===
Saturday, January 31, 14:00

Team	1	2	3	4	5	6	7	8	9	10	Final
United States (McCormick)	1	0	3	1	0	0	1	0	0	X	6
Brazil (Mello)	0	1	0	0	1	0	0	1	1	X	4

=== Game 3 ===
Saturday, January 31, 19:00

Team	1	2	3	4	5	6	7	8	9	10	Final
United States (McCormick)	3	0	3	0	0	1	0	2	X	X	9
Brazil (Mello)	0	1	0	0	2	0	1	0	X	X	4
