= John Landsteiner =

American curler (born 1990)

- Curler
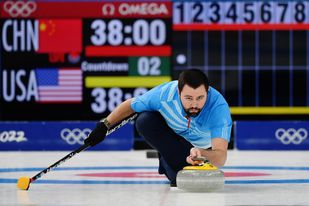
- Landsteiner at the 2022 Winter Olympics
- Born: May 19, 1990 (age 36); Mankato, Minnesota, U.S.
- Height: 5 ft 11 in (180 cm)

Team
- Curling club: Duluth CC, Duluth, MN

Curling career
- Member Association: United States
- World Championship: 7 (2015, 2016, 2017, 2019, 2021, 2023, 2024)
- Pan Continental Championship: 1 (2024)
- Olympic: 3 (2014, 2018, 2022)
Medal record
Men's curling
Representing United States
Winter Olympics
Gold medal – first place	2018 Pyeongchang	Team
World Championships
Bronze medal – third place	2016 Basel
Pan Continental Championships
Bronze medal – third place	2024 Lacombe
Representing Minnesota
US Olympic Trials
Gold medal – first place	2013 Fargo
Gold medal – first place	2017 Omaha
Gold medal – first place	2021 Omaha
Silver medal – second place	2025 Sioux Falls
US Men's Championship
Gold medal – first place	2015 Kalamazoo
Gold medal – first place	2017 Everett
Gold medal – first place	2019 Kalamazoo
Gold medal – first place	2020 Cheney
Gold medal – first place	2023 Denver
Gold medal – first place	2024 East Rutherford
Silver medal – second place	2016 Jacksonville
Bronze medal – third place	2012 Philadelphia
Bronze medal – third place	2013 Green Bay
Bronze medal – third place	2025 Duluth

John Landsteiner (born May 19, 1990) is a retired American curler and three-time Olympian. He won gold as part of Shuster's team at the 2018 Winter Olympics and also competed in 2014 and 2022.

== Career ==
Landsteiner was a prolific junior curler, playing in the United States Junior Curling Championships six times every year from 2007 through 2011. His best finish was in 2008 when he earned the bronze medal playing lead for Brad Caldwell. In 2011 Landsteiner participated at the World Junior Championships as alternate for Aaron Wald's team.

Since aging out of juniors in 2012, Landsteiner has played lead for John Shuster's team. With this team, Landsteiner has played in seven US National Championships, only missing one year, 2018, because of obligations after the Olympics. Of the seven appearances at the National Championship, Team Shuster earned a medal six times, including gold in 2015, 2017, and 2019.

Landsteiner's team placed first at the 2013 United States Olympic Curling Trials, then earned the final qualification spot for the 2014 Olympics at the qualification event when they won the second qualifier 8–5 over the Czech Republic. At the Winter Games the American men finished 9th out of 10 teams, with a record of 2–7.

After the poor performance at the 2014 Winter Olympics, the United States Curling Association held an athlete combine to determine which curlers to include in their High Performance Program (HPP) aimed at having better success at the next Olympics. Landsteiner and Shuster were two of the athletes dropped from the HPP. In response, Shuster created a new team nicknamed "The Rejects" with Landsteiner at lead, fellow combine reject Matt Hamilton at second, and Tyler George at third, who hadn't attended the combine due to his work. They maintained this line-up for four seasons and found great success. At the National Championships in 2015, they defeated both HPP teams to win the gold medal. Representing the United States at the 2015 World Championship in Halifax, Nova Scotia, Team Shuster missed out on the playoffs when they lost a tiebreaker to Finland's Aku Kauste. As a result of its success, Team Shuster was added to the High Performance Program for 2016.

Landsteiner and his team came up just short of defending their national title in 2016, losing to Brady Clark in the final. Despite finishing in second, Team Shuster earned enough points throughout the season to secure their return trip to the World Championship. In Basel, Switzerland they defeated Japan's Yusuke Morozumi in the bronze medal match, earning the first World Men's medal for the United States since 2007. For the 2016–17 season they added Joe Polo, a former teammate of Shuster and George, as alternate and won the 2017 National Championship. At the 2017 World Championship, their third Worlds in a row, they lost in the bronze medal game against Team Switzerland, skipped by Peter de Cruz.

At the 2017 United States Olympic Curling Trials, Landsteiner and his team beat Heath McCormick's team in a best-of-three final series to represent the US at the Olympics a second time. In the 2018 Winter Olympics in PyeongChang, the US team lost four of its first six matches and needed to win all of its three remaining matches to qualify for the playoffs, but all of its remaining opponents (Canada, Switzerland, and Great Britain) were currently among the top four teams. Nevertheless, the US team won all three matches to finish the round-robin in third place with a record of 5–4. In the semifinals, they defeated Canada's Kevin Koe, a two-time world champion, to reach the gold-medal match versus Niklas Edin's team representing Sweden. The gold-medal game was close through seven ends, with the score tied 5–5, but the United States scored five in the eighth end to set up a 10–7 victory. This was the first Olympic gold medal in curling for the United States.

Landsteiner and Team Shuster again won the US National Championship in 2019. At the 2019 World Championship they finished 5th. They defended their United States title at the 2020 United States Men's Championship, defeating Rich Ruohonen in the final to finish the tournament undefeated. The national title would have earned Team Shuster a spot at the final Grand Slam of the season, the Champions Cup, as well as the chance to represent the United States at the 2020 World Men's Curling Championship, but both events were cancelled due to the COVID-19 pandemic.

Team Shuster represented the United States at the 2021 World Men's Curling Championship, which was played in a fan-less bubble in Calgary due to the ongoing COVID-19 pandemic. There, the team led the U.S. to a 10–3 round robin record, in third place. They played Switzerland in the playoffs, in a game which was delayed a day due to some curlers testing positive for the virus. In the game, Switzerland, skipped by Peter de Cruz, beat the Americans to advance to the semifinals.

Landsteiner announced his retirement from competitive curling in 2025.

== Personal life ==
Landsteiner's hometown is Mapleton, Minnesota, and he currently resides in Saginaw, Minnesota, is married and has one child. He graduated from University of Minnesota Duluth in 2013 with a degree in civil engineering. He currently works as a integrity engineer for Lake Superior Consulting.

== Teams ==
Season	Skip	Third	Second	Lead	Alternate	Coach	Events
2007–08	Brad Caldwell	Matt Collom	Tyler Vietanen	John Landsteiner			2008 USJCC (bronze)
2008–09	Brad Caldwell	Matt Collom	Tyler Vietanen	John Landsteiner			2009 USJCC (9th)
2010–11	John Landsteiner	Tyler Vietanen	Matt Collom	Robert Splinter			2011 USJCC (4th)
2010–11	Aaron Wald	Josh Bahr	Jared Zezel	John Muller	John Landsteiner	Tim Muller	2011 WJCC (6th)
2011–12	John Shuster	Zach Jacobson	Jared Zezel	John Landsteiner			2012 USMCC (bronze)
2012–13	John Shuster	Jeff Isaacson	Jared Zezel	John Landsteiner			2013 USMCC (bronze)
2013–14	John Shuster	Jeff Isaacson	Jared Zezel	John Landsteiner	Craig Brown (OG)	Tim Muller	2013 USOCT (gold); 2014 USMCC (5th); 2014 OG (9th)
2014–15	John Shuster	Tyler George	Matt Hamilton	John Landsteiner	Craig Brown (WMCC)	Pete Fenson	2015 USMCC (gold); 2015 WMCC (5th)
2015–16	John Shuster	Tyler George	Matt Hamilton	John Landsteiner	Kroy Nernberger (WMCC)	Phill Drobnick	2016 USMCC (silver); 2016 WMCC (bronze)
2016–17	John Shuster	Tyler George	Matt Hamilton	John Landsteiner	Joe Polo	Phill Drobnick	2017 USMCC (gold); 2017 WMCC (4th)
2017–18	John Shuster	Tyler George	Matt Hamilton	John Landsteiner	Joe Polo	Phill Drobnick	2017 USOCT (gold); 2018 OG (gold)
2018–19	John Shuster	Chris Plys	Matt Hamilton	John Landsteiner	Korey Dropkin (WMCC)	Derek Brown	2019 USMCC (gold); 2019 WMCC (5th)
2019–20	John Shuster	Chris Plys	Matt Hamilton	John Landsteiner		Sean Beighton	2020 USMCC (gold)
2020–21	John Shuster	Chris Plys	Matt Hamilton	John Landsteiner	Colin Hufman	Sean Beighton	2021 WMCC (5th)
2021–22	John Shuster	Chris Plys	Matt Hamilton	John Landsteiner	Colin Hufman		2021 USOCT (gold); 2022 OG (4th)
2022–23	John Shuster	Chris Plys	Matt Hamilton	John Landsteiner	Colin Hufman	Phil Drobnick	2023 USMCC (gold); 2023 WMCC (8th)
2023–24	John Shuster	Chris Plys	Colin Hufman	Matt Hamilton	John Landsteiner	Theran Michaelis	2024 USMCC (gold); 2024 WMCC (6th)
2024–25	John Shuster	Chris Plys	Colin Hufman	Matt Hamilton	John Landsteiner	Theran Michaelis	2024 PCCC (bronze); 2025 USMCC (bronze)
