= Tyler George =

American curler (born 1982)

- Curler
- Born: October 6, 1982 (age 44); Duluth, Minnesota, U.S.

Team
- Curling club: Duluth CC, Duluth, MN

Curling career
- World Championship: 4 (2010, 2015, 2016, 2017)
- Olympic: 1 (2018)
Medal record
Men's curling
Representing United States
Winter Olympics
Gold medal – first place	2018 Pyeongchang	Team
World Curling Championships
Bronze medal – third place	2016 Basel
World Junior Championships
Bronze medal – third place	2001 Ogden
US Men's Championship
Gold medal – first place	2010 Kalamazoo
Gold medal – first place	2015 Kalamazoo
Gold medal – first place	2017 Everett
Silver medal – second place	2011 Fargo
Silver medal – second place	2013 Green Bay
Silver medal – second place	2016 Jacksonville
US Olympic Trials
Gold medal – first place	2017 Omaha
Silver medal – second place	2009 Broomfield

Tyler George (born October 6, 1982) is an American curler from Duluth, Minnesota. He is a three-time U.S. Champion, 2016 World bronze medalist, and 2018 Olympic gold medalist. Since the 2018 Olympics, he has taken a break from playing competitive curling, instead spending time as an ambassador and coach for the sport.

== Curling career ==
=== Juniors ===
George competed at the United States Junior National Championships several times but never made it past the semifinals. However, in 2001 he was invited to be the alternate on Andy Roza's team at the 2001 World Junior Curling Championships, where they defeated Scotland's David Edwards in the bronze medal match.

In 2002 George teamed up with Shellan Reed and Patti Luke, two of the previous year's Minnesota Women's Club State Champions, and Gary Luke, to play as a mixed team. They won the Minnesota Mixed State Championship and made it to the finals of the National Mixed Championship, ultimately earning silver medals after losing to Brady Clark's team.

=== 2008–2014: Early men's career ===
George's first trip to the Men's National Championship was in 2008. He skipped his team of Kris Perkovich, Phill Drobnick, and Kevin Johnson to a fifth place finish, missing the playoffs when they lost a tiebreaker to four-time national champion Jason Larway. The next year Mark Haluptzok replaced Drobnick on Team George and they returned to the National Championship, which doubled as the Olympic Trials for the 2010 Winter Olympics. They finished the round-robin with only one loss, securing the number one seed in the page playoffs. They lost the final to John Shuster by one point, with a final score of 9–10, settling for silver medals and giving the Olympic berth to Shuster.

For a single season, 2009–10, George joined Pete Fenson's team at lead. They won the 2010 United States Men's Championship, earning George his first chance to represent the United States at Men's Worlds. The 2010 World Men's Championship was held in Cortina d'Ampezzo, Italy and Team Fenson finished in fourth when they lost to Scotland's Warwick Smith in the 3 vs. 4 page playoff game.

After leaving the Fenson team George again formed his own team, consisting of Chris Plys, Rich Ruohonen and Phill Drobnick. They played in the 2011 US Nationals, where they went through the round robin with a 7–2 win–loss record. They were defeated by George's former skip Fenson in the 1 vs. 2 page playoffs and again in the final, earning George his second US silver medal. Colin Hufman replaced Drobnick the following season and they finished the 2012 US Nationals in eighth place. The 2013 National Championship yielded better results, again earning the silver medal, this time losing to Brady Clark in the final. Their runner-up finish qualified the team to participate at the 2013 United States Olympic Curling Trials, where they finished tied for third place.

=== 2014–2018: Gold with Team Shuster ===
After the 2014 Winter Olympics, the United States Curling Association held an athlete combine to determine which curlers to include in their High Performance Program (HPP), aimed at having better success at the next Olympics. George did not attend due to his work. After the combine John Shuster, three-time Olympian at that point, was dropped from the HPP and in response created a new team nicknamed "The Rejects", bringing on fellow combine rejects John Landsteiner and Matt Hamilton at lead and second, respectively, and George at third. They maintained this line-up for four seasons and found great success. At the National Championships in 2015 they defeated both HPP teams to win the gold medal. Representing the United States at the 2015 World Championship in Halifax, Nova Scotia, Team Shuster missed out on the playoffs when they lost a tiebreaker to Finland's Aku Kauste. As a result of its success, Team Shuster was added to the High Performance Program for 2016.

George and his team came up just short of defending their national title in 2016, losing to Brady Clark in the final. Despite finishing in second, Team Shuster earned enough points throughout the season to secure their return trip to the World Championship. In Basel, Switzerland they defeated Japan's Yusuke Morozumi in the bronze medal match, earning the first World Men's medal for the United States since 2007. For the 2016–17 season they added Joe Polo, a former teammate of George and Shuster, as alternate and won the 2017 National Championship. At the 2017 World Championship, their third Worlds in a row, they lost in the bronze medal game against Team Switzerland, skipped by Peter de Cruz.

At the 2017 United States Olympic Curling Trials George and his team beat Heath McCormick's team in a best-of-three final series to earn his first trip to the Olympics. At the 2018 Winter Olympics in PyeongChang, the US team lost four of its first six matches and needed to win all of its three remaining matches to qualify for the playoffs, but all of its remaining opponents (Canada, Switzerland, and Great Britain) were currently among the top four teams. Nevertheless, the US team won all three matches to finish the round-robin in third place with a record of 5–4. In the semifinals they defeated Canada's Kevin Koe, a two-time world champion, to reach the gold-medal match versus Niklas Edin's team representing Sweden. The gold-medal game was close through seven ends, with the score tied 5–5, but the United States scored five in the eighth end to set up a 10–7 victory. This was the first Olympic gold medal in curling for the United States.

=== 2018–present: Sports ambassador and coach ===
After winning gold, George elected to temporarily step away from curling, citing his desires to take time off to "...recharge the battery, let my body heal." He has become a sports ambassador for the United States Curling Association, making appearances and doing outreach to the curling community in the United States.

George coached Luc Violette's Team United States at the 2020 World Junior Curling Championships. They finished in seventh place.

== Personal life ==
George works as a general manager for George's Liquor.

== Teams ==
=== Men's ===
Season	Skip	Third	Second	Lead	Alternate	Coach	Events
1999–00	Tanner Hammerschmidt	Nick Myers	Dan Garvin	Nathan Annis	Tyler George	Tom George	2000 USJCC (5th)
2002–03	Tyler George	Mike Moore	Nick Young	Jordan Atherine	Tom Moore	Mark Lazar	2003 USJCC (SF)
2007–08	Tyler George	Kris Perkovich	Phill Drobnick	Kevin Johnson		Tom George	2008 USMCC (5th)
2008–09	Tyler George	Kris Perkovich	Kevin Johnson	Mark Haluptzok			2009 USMCC/USOCT (silver)
2009–10	Pete Fenson	Shawn Rojeski	Joe Polo	Tyler George	Mark Haluptzok (WMCC)	Ed Lukowich	2010 USMCC (gold); 2010 WMCC (4th)
2010–11	Tyler George	Chris Plys	Rich Ruohonen	Phill Drobnick			2011 USMCC (silver)
2011–12	Tyler George	Chris Plys	Rich Ruohonen	Colin Hufman			2012 USMCC (8th)
2012–13	Chris Plys (Fourth)	Tyler George (Skip)	Rich Ruohonen	Colin Hufman			2013 USMCC (silver)
2013–14	Chris Plys (Fourth)	Tyler George (Skip)	Rich Ruohonen	Colin Hufman	Craig Brown		2013 USOCT (4th)
2013–14	Tyler George	Bill Stopera	Dean Gemmell	Martin Sather			2014 USMC (6th)
2014–15	John Shuster	Tyler George	Matt Hamilton	John Landsteiner	Craig Brown (WMCC)	Pete Fenson	2015 USMCC (gold); 2015 WMCC (5th)
2015–16	John Shuster	Tyler George	Matt Hamilton	John Landsteiner	Kroy Nernberger (WMCC)	Phill Drobnick	2016 USNCC (silver); 2016 WMCC (bronze)
2016–17	John Shuster	Tyler George	Matt Hamilton	John Landsteiner	Joe Polo	Phill Drobnick	2017 USMCC (gold); 2017 WMCC (4th)
2017–18	John Shuster	Tyler George	Matt Hamilton	John Landsteiner	Joe Polo	Phill Drobnick	2017 USOCT (gold); 2018 OG (gold)

=== Mixed ===
Season	Skip	Third	Second	Lead	Events
2001–02	Tyler George	Shellan Reed	Gary Luke	Patti Luke	2002 USMxCC (silver)
2018–19	Tyler George	Courtney George	Derek Benson	Jordan Moulton	2019 USMxCC (8th)

=== Mixed doubles ===
Season	Male	Female	Events
2010–11	Tyler George	Courtney George	2011 USMDCC (bronze)
2014–15	Tyler George	Courtney George	2015 USMDCC (DNQ)
2015–16	Tyler George	Courtney George	US World Trials (4th)
2016–17	Tyler George	Courtney George	2017 USMDCC (DNQ)
2017–18	Tyler George	Courtney George	
