= 2012 Continental Cup of Curling =

2012 World Financial Group Continental Cup of Curling
- Host city: Langley, British Columbia
- Arena: Langley Events Centre
- Dates: January 12–15
- Winner: Team World
Score Breakdown
Discipline	NA	World
Women's Team Round 1	9	9
Mixed Doubles Round 1	6	12
Men's Team Round 1	9	9
Women's Team Round 2	9	9
Mixed Doubles Round 2	0	18
Men's Team Round 2	9	9
Skins A	26	34
Singles	8	24
Skins B	44	46
Women's Skins C	25	30
Men's Skins C	20	35
Total	165	235

The 2012 World Financial Group Continental Cup of Curling was held from Thursday, January 12 to Sunday, January 15 at the Langley Events Centre in Langley, British Columbia. Just like in the previous year's event, the Continental Cup featured team events, mixed doubles events, singles competitions, and skins competitions, and the brunt of the points were won in the skins competitions. TSN broadcast the event, as it has in previous years.

Team World aimed to level the field after Team North America won the previous cup, which brought the overall total to 4–3 in favour of North America, and was successful, tying the overall total at 4–4. Team World's win ensured that no defending champion to date would successfully defend its title from the previous Cup, continuing a pattern that has occurred since the inception of the event. In their win, Team World also won the most points that they have won in this event, topping their score of 229 points won in 2006.

== Event summary ==
Team World and Team North America started off the event relatively close in points. On Thursday, both teams tied their team draws and Team World took a small lead after the first mixed doubles draw. The second day, Friday, also resulted in tied draws in the team games, but Team World won three close mixed doubles games to take a larger lead heading into Day 3. Saturday saw the singles competition, where Team World swept the women's competition and won the aggregate bonus, and two very close skins draws, which Team North America used to make up their deficit. In the Skins B games, a series of carryovers had resulted in the games' final skins worth a combined total of 52 points. Team North America had the opportunity to take their first lead in the event, but only won one of the three final skins, giving Team World a big advantage. Team North America was able to prevent Team World from winning the Cup on Saturday, but Team World entered Sunday needing only 31 points to win the Cup.

In the Women's Skins C game, Stefanie Lawton and her team were able to prevent Wang Bingyu from winning the Cup in their skins game by winning the first five ends, but Wang and her team came back to pick up the last three skins and thirty points, placing Team World on the brink of victory at 200 points, one point short of the 201 point total needed to win the Cup. The pressure shifted to Jeff Stoughton to keep the North Americans' hopes of a comeback alive. Team World's position at 200 points meant that it was possible for Team North America to tie the event, if Stoughton won all of the skins in his game versus Thomas Ulsrud, a feat that Anette Norberg accomplished in 2003 against Sherry Middaugh. In the event that the Continental Cup ended in a tie, the rules stipulated that the defending champion, North America, would retain the cup, similar to that in the rules of the Ryder Cup in golf. If there was a tie, the purses would have been split equally among all players. The Men's Skins C game saw Ulsrud and his team capitalize on a mistake by Stoughton to secure a skin of five points and win the eighth edition of the Continental Cup. The winning team, Team World, received a purse of CAD$52,000, CAD$2,000 per player, and the losing team received a purse of CAD$26,000, CAD$1,000 per player. The winning team of the last men's skin game (the Men's Skins C game), Team World, received a bonus of CAD$13,000.

== Teams ==
The teams were selected from the top teams in each region. Six teams from each region will compete against each other in the competition. Teams from Canada get to represent North America by virtue of winning certain events, such as the Tim Hortons Brier and the Canada Cup of Curling. The teams from the United States are chosen by the United States Curling Association to represent North America, and the teams representing Team World are selected by the World Curling Federation.

The teams in the table below have been announced as representatives of their respective regions. For Team North America, the teams participating include Canada Cup champions Stefanie Lawton and Glenn Howard, Tournament of Hearts champion Amber Holland, Brier champion Jeff Stoughton, and the United States men's and women's champions Pete Fenson and Patti Lank. For Team World, the teams participating include world champion Anette Norberg, former world champion Wang Bingyu, world junior champion Eve Muirhead, world bronze medalist Niklas Edin, world silver medalist Tom Brewster, and Olympic silver medalist Thomas Ulsrud.

Team	Skip	Third	Second	Lead	Locale
Team; North; America	Stefanie Lawton	Sherry Anderson	Sherri Singler	Marliese Kasner	(Canada) Saskatoon, Saskatchewan
Team; North; America	Amber Holland	Kim Schneider	Tammy Schneider	Heather Kalenchuk	(Canada) Kronau, Saskatchewan
Team; North; America	Patti Lank	Nina Spatola	Caitlin Maroldo	Mackenzie Lank	(United States) Lewiston, New York
Team; North; America	Glenn Howard	Wayne Middaugh	Brent Laing	Craig Savill	(Canada) Coldwater, Ontario
Team; North; America	Jeff Stoughton	Jon Mead	Reid Carruthers	Ben Hebert^{1}	(Canada) Winnipeg, Manitoba
Team; North; America	Pete Fenson	Shawn Rojeski	Joe Polo	Ryan Brunt	(United States) Bemidji, Minnesota
Team; North; America	Coach: (Canada) Julie Skinner, Captain: (Canada) Rick Lang				
Team; World	Anette Norberg	Cecilia Östlund	Sara Carlsson	Liselotta Lennartsson	(Sweden) Karlstad
Team; World	Wang Bingyu	Sun Yue	Yue Qingshuang	Zhou Yan	(China) Harbin
Team; World	Eve Muirhead	Anna Sloan	Vicki Adams	Claire Hamilton	(Scotland) Lockerbie
Team; World	Niklas Edin	Sebastian Kraupp	Fredrik Lindberg	Viktor Kjäll	(Sweden) Karlstad
Team; World	Tom Brewster	Greg Drummond	Scott Andrews	Michael Goodfellow	(Scotland) Aberdeen
Team; World	Thomas Ulsrud	Torger Nergård	Christoffer Svae	Håvard Vad Petersson	(Norway) Oslo
Team; World	Coach: (Scotland) David Hay, Captain: (Sweden) Peja Lindholm				

Notes

1. Steve Gould, Stoughton's lead, was not able to participate in the event due to illness, so Hebert, Kevin Martin's lead, was chosen as his replacement.

== Events ==
All times listed are Pacific Standard Time. The draws for Thursday and Friday were released on Wednesday night, and the draws for Saturday and Sunday were released on Friday afternoon.

=== Thursday, January 12 ===
Women's team 8:30 am

Sheet A	1	2	3	4	5	6	7	8	Final	Points
North America (Lank)	0	0	0	2	0	0	2	1	5	0
World (Wang) 🔨	0	1	0	0	2	3	0	0	6	6

Sheet B	1	2	3	4	5	6	7	8	Final	Points
North America (Lawton) 🔨	1	0	1	4	0	4	1	0	11	6
World (Norberg)	0	1	0	0	1	0	0	1	3	0

Sheet C	1	2	3	4	5	6	7	8	Final	Points
North America (Holland)	1	0	1	0	1	0	2	0	5	3
World (Muirhead)	0	1	0	1	0	1	0	2	5	3

Mixed doubles 1:00 pm

Sheet A	1	2	3	4	5	6	7	8	Final	Points
North America (Middaugh/Spatola) 🔨	2	0	4	0	1	0	0	0	7	3
World (Brewster/Yue)	0	1	0	2	0	2	0	2	7	3

Sheet B	1	2	3	4	5	6	7	8	Final	Points
North America (Carruthers/K. Schneider) 🔨	1	0	1	1	1	0	0	X	4	0
World (Kraupp/Norberg)	0	5	0	0	0	2	1	X	8	6

Sheet C	1	2	3	4	5	6	7	8	Final	Points
North America (Rojeski/Kasner)	0	4	0	0	3	0	2	0	9	3
World (Ulsrud/Östlund) 🔨	1	0	4	1	0	1	0	2	9	3

Men's team 6:30 pm

Sheet A	1	2	3	4	5	6	7	8	Final	Points
North America (Fenson)	0	0	1	0	0	0	X	X	1	0
World (Brewster) 🔨	2	1	0	0	2	2	X	X	7	6

Sheet B	1	2	3	4	5	6	7	8	Final	Points
North America (Stoughton)	0	1	0	4	0	2	1	X	8	6
World (Edin) 🔨	0	0	1	0	2	0	0	X	3	0

Sheet C	1	2	3	4	5	6	7	8	Final	Points
North America (Howard)	0	0	0	0	1	1	0	2	4	3
World (Ulsrud) 🔨	2	0	0	1	0	0	1	0	4	3

=== Friday, January 13 ===
Women's team 8:30 am

Sheet A	1	2	3	4	5	6	7	8	Final	Points
North America (Lank) 🔨	1	0	0	1	3	0	3	X	8	6
World (Norberg)	0	0	2	0	0	3	0	X	5	0

Sheet B	1	2	3	4	5	6	7	8	Final	Points
North America (Holland)	0	1	1	1	0	0	1	0	4	0
World (Wang) 🔨	2	0	0	0	1	1	0	2	6	6

Sheet C	1	2	3	4	5	6	7	8	Final	Points
North America (Lawton) 🔨	0	0	1	0	1	0	0	1	3	3
World (Muirhead)	0	1	0	1	0	1	0	0	3	3

Mixed doubles 1:00 pm

Sheet A	1	2	3	4	5	6	7	8	Final	Points
North America (Savill/P. Lank)	1	0	0	1	0	1	1	X	4	0
World (Nergård/Wang)	0	2	1	0	2	0	0	X	5	6

Sheet B	1	2	3	4	5	6	7	8	Final	Points
North America (Hebert/Lawton)	0	0	0	0	3	0	2	2	7	0
World (Lindberg/Muirhead)	2	2	2	1	0	1	0	0	8	6

Sheet C	1	2	3	4	5	6	7	8	Final	Points
North America (Polo/Holland)	0	1	0	0	3	0	1	X	5	0
World (Drummond/Sloan)	1	0	3	1	0	2	0	X	7	6

Men's team 7:00 pm

Sheet A	1	2	3	4	5	6	7	8	Final	Points
North America (Howard)	0	0	0	1	0	4	1	X	6	6
World (Edin) 🔨	0	0	3	0	1	0	0	X	4	0

Sheet B	1	2	3	4	5	6	7	8	Final	Points
North America (Fenson) 🔨	2	0	0	0	1	0	1	0	4	3
World (Ulsrud)	0	0	1	0	0	1	0	2	4	3

Sheet C	1	2	3	4	5	6	7	8	Final	Points
North America (Stoughton)	0	0	3	0	1	0	2	0	6	0
World (Brewster) 🔨	1	2	0	2	0	1	0	1	7	6

=== Saturday, January 14 ===
A Skins 9:00 am

Each skins game has 20 points available.

Sheet A	1	2	3	4	5	6	7	8	Points
North America (Lank)			X		X				4
World (Norberg) 🔨	X	X		X		0	X	X	16

Sheet B	1	2	3	4	5	6	7	8	Points
North America (Howard/Anderson/Laing/Singler) 🔨	X		X		X		0	X	18
World (Edin/Muirhead/Svae/Yue)		0		0		X			2

Sheet C	1	2	3	4	5	6	7	8	Points
North America (Fenson) 🔨	0			X	X				4
World (Brewster)		X	X			X	X	X	16

Singles 1:30 pm

Each singles game has 4 points available, for a total of 32 points in the singles competition.

Sheet A	Runthrough	Button	Port	Raise	Hit-and-Roll	Double	Total	Points
North America (Holland)	0	5	3	2	1	0	11	0
World (Muirhead)	1	5	5	2	2	0	15	4

Sheet B	Runthrough	Button	Port	Raise	Hit-and-Roll	Double	Total	Points
North America (Lawton)	5	4	5	3	2	1	20	0
World (Wang)	4	4	5	4	4	0	21	4

Sheet C	Runthrough	Button	Port	Raise	Hit-and-Roll	Double	Total	Points
North America (Lank)	3	3	5	0	0	0	11	0
World (Norberg)	0	5	4	3	2	5	19	4

Sheet A	Runthrough	Button	Port	Raise	Hit-and-Roll	Double	Total	Points
North America (Fenson)	0	5	3	5	2	0	15	4
World (Edin)	0	5	2	3	1	3	14	0

Sheet B	Runthrough	Button	Port	Raise	Hit-and-Roll	Double	Total	Points
North America (Stoughton)	2	4	5	4	5	5	25	4
World (Brewster)	0	5	5	2	4	0	16	0

Sheet C	Runthrough	Button	Port	Raise	Hit-and-Roll	Double	Total	Points
North America (Howard)	3	3	2	1	1	5	15	0
World (Ulsrud)	0	5	5	4	3	0	17	4

Team World receives a bonus of 8 points in the singles competition by earning an aggregate total higher than that of Team North America, with 102 points to Team North America's 97 points.

B Skins 6:30 pm

Each skins game has 30 points available.

Sheet A	1	2	3	4	5	6	7	8	Points
North America (Holland)	X		X		0		0		4
World (Muirhead) 🔨		X		X		0		X	26

Sheet B	1	2	3	4	5	6	7	8	Points
North America (Stoughton/P. Lank/Mead/M. Lank)		0		0		X			15
World (Ulsrud/Wang/Drummond/Carlsson) 🔨	0		0		0		0	X	15

Sheet C	1	2	3	4	5	6	7	8	Points
North America (Howard) 🔨		0		0	X	X		X	25
World (Edin)	X		X				0		5

=== Sunday, January 15 ===
Both skins games have 55 points available.

Women's C Skins 10:30 am

Team	1	2	3	4	5	6	7	8	Button	Points
North America (Lawton) 🔨	0		X		X			0		25
World (Wang)		0		0		X	X		X	30

Men's C Skins 5:00 pm

Sheet B	1	2	3	4	5	6	7	8	Points
North America (Stoughton)	X	X		X	X				20
World (Ulsrud) 🔨			X			X	X	X	35

With an in-off tap for two in the third end, Ulsrud won the skin of five points and clinched the Continental Cup for Team World. Later on, in the eighth end, Ulsrud and his team took advantage of crucial mistakes from Stoughton to steal the last skin and win the game and the bonus $13,000 for Team World.
