= Shawn Rojeski =

American curler

- Curler
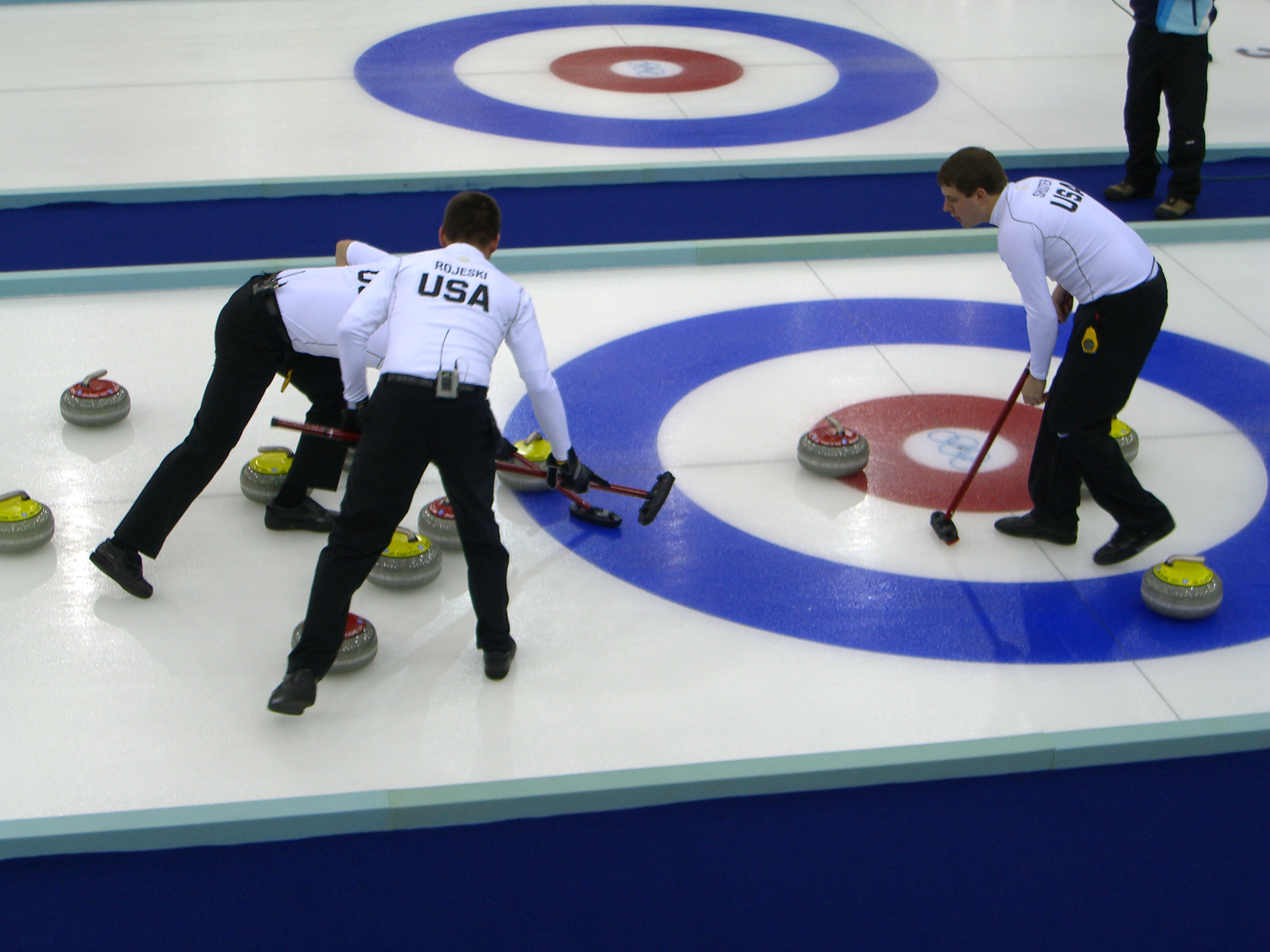
- Born: January 21, 1972 (age 54); Virginia, Minnesota, U.S.

Team
- Curling club: Hibbing CC, Hibbing, Minnesota
- Skip: Pete Fenson
- Third: Shawn Rojeski
- Second: Mark Fenner
- Lead: Alex Fenson

Curling career
- World Championship: 7 (1998, 2003, 2005, 2006, 2010, 2011, 2014)
- Olympic: 1 (2006)
Medal record
Men's curling
Representing United States
Olympic Games
Bronze medal – third place	2006 Turin	Team
United States Men's Curling Championship
Gold medal – first place	2003 Utica	Team
Gold medal – first place	2006 Bemidji	Team
Gold medal – first place	2010 Kalamazoo	Team
Gold medal – first place	2011 Fargo	Team
Gold medal – first place	2014 Philadelphia	Team
Silver medal – second place	2012 Philadelphia	Team
World Junior Curling Championships
Bronze medal – third place	1991 Glasgow
United States Olympic Curling Trials
Gold medal – first place	2005 Madison	Team
Silver medal – second place	2013 Fargo	Team

Shawn Rojeski (born January 21, 1972) is an American curler from Chisholm, Minnesota and Olympic medalist. He was born and raised in Biwabik, Minnesota and attended Mesabi East High School. Under skip Pete Fenson, he received a bronze medal at the 2006 Winter Olympics in Turin, playing as the third. The team was later named the 2006 USOC Team of the Year.

He participated on the American team at the 1998, 2003, 2005, 2006 2010, 2011 and 2014 World Curling Championships.

After participating at the 2010 Worlds and finishing in fourth place, he and the rest of the Fenson rink teamed up with Ryan Brunt and went to the 2011 Continental Cup of Curling, where Team North America defeated Team World. He then went to the 2011 US Nationals, where, after remaining undefeated in the round robin, the Fenson rink won the gold medal at the nationals. They represented the United States at the 2011 Ford World Men's Curling Championship in April at Regina, Saskatchewan, finishing with a 3–8 win–loss record at 10th after a series of close losses.

== Teams ==
Season	Skip	Third	Second	Lead	Events
2002–03	Pete Fenson	Eric Fenson	Shawn Rojeski	John Shuster	2003 USMCC, 2003 WMCC
2003–04	Pete Fenson	Eric Fenson	Shawn Rojeski	John Shuster	2003 Cont. Cup
2004–05	Pete Fenson	Eric Fenson	Shawn Rojeski	John Shuster	2005 USMCC, 2005 WMCC
2005–06	Pete Fenson	Shawn Rojeski	Joe Polo	Doug Pottinger	2006 Cont. Cup
2005–06	Pete Fenson	Shawn Rojeski	Joe Polo	John Shuster	2006 USMCC, 2006 OG, 2006 WMCC
2006–07	Pete Fenson	Shawn Rojeski	Joe Polo	John Shuster	
2007–08	Pete Fenson	Shawn Rojeski	Joe Polo	John Shuster	2008 USMCC
2009–10	Pete Fenson	Shawn Rojeski	Joe Polo	Tyler George	2010 USMCC, 2010 WMCC
2010–11	Pete Fenson	Shawn Rojeski	Joe Polo	Ryan Brunt	2011 Cont. Cup, 2011 USMCC, 2011 WMCC
2011–12	Pete Fenson	Shawn Rojeski	Joe Polo	Ryan Brunt	2012 Cont. Cup, 2012 USMCC
2012–13	Pete Fenson	Shawn Rojeski	Joe Polo	Ryan Brunt	2013 USMCC
2013–14	Pete Fenson	Shawn Rojeski	Joe Polo	Ryan Brunt	
