= 2010 United States Men's Curling Championship =

- Host city: Kalamazoo, Michigan
- Arena: Wings Stadium
- Dates: March 6–13
- Winner: (Minnesota) Pete Fenson
- Curling club: Bemidji CC, Bemidji, Minnesota
- Skip: Pete Fenson
- Third: Joe Polo
- Second: Shawn Rojeski
- Lead: Tyler George
- Finalist: (Minnesota) Mike Farbelow

The 2010 United States Curling Men's Championships were held in Kalamazoo, Michigan from March 6 to 13. The 54th edition of the United States Curling Men's Championships was held alongside the 2010 Women's Nationals. Teams could qualify through three different methods. John Shuster's team qualified through the first method by virtue of being the defending champions. Next, teams could qualify by finishing in the top spots of their respective regional championships. The final method of qualification came in a Nationals Playdown where the teams that placed between 2nd and 4th in their regional qualifications compete for the final three spots.

On Friday, February 27, 2010 it was revealed on the USA Network broadcast that John Shuster's team had elected to withdraw from the National Championships. The team skipped by Wes Johnson replaced them.

The winning team represented the United States at the 2010 Capital One World Men's Curling Championship.

== Teams ==
The teams are listed as follows:

| Skip | Third | Second | Lead | Alternate | Locale |
|---|---|---|---|---|---|
| Pete Fenson | Shawn Rojeski | Joe Polo | Tyler George | | Bemidji, Minnesota |
| Todd Birr | Paul Pustovar | Tom O'Connor | Kevin Birr | | Mankato, Minnesota |
| Blake Morton | Marcus Fonger | Tommy Juszczyk | Calvin Weber | Mark Hartman | McFarland, Wisconsin |
| Craig Brown | Rich Ruohonen | Zach Jacobson | Pete Annis | | Madison, Wisconsin |
| Matt Stevens | Cody Stevens | Bob Liapis | Jeff Breyen | | Bemidji, Minnesota |
| Matt Hames | Bill Stopera | Martin Sather | Dean Gemmell | | (New York (state)) Buffalo, New York |
| Kevin Kakela | Chad Carlson | Ryan Lagasse | Todd Ussatis | | Rolla, North Dakota |
| Bryan Wight | Michael Moore | Joey Bonfoey | Mark Lazar | Kevin Deeren | (New York (state)) Canandaigua, New York |
| Mike Farbelow | Eric Fenson | Nick Myers | Jeff Puleo | Mark Willmert | Minneapolis, Minnesota |
| Wes Johnson | Leon Romaniuk | Paul Lyttle | Richard Maskel | | (Washington (state)) Snohomish, Washington |

== Round robin standings ==
| Skip | W | L |
|---|---|---|
| (Minnesota) Pete Fenson | 6 | 3 |
| (Minnesota) Mike Farbelow | 6 | 3 |
| (Minnesota) Matt Stevens | 6 | 3 |
| (New York (state)) Matt Hames | 6 | 3 |
| (Washington (state)) Wes Johnson | 5 | 4 |
| (Wisconsin) Craig Brown | 5 | 4 |
| (Minnesota) Todd Birr | 4 | 5 |
| (North Dakota) Kevin Kakela | 3 | 6 |
| (Wisconsin) Blake Morton | 3 | 6 |
| (New York (state)) Bryan Wight | 1 | 8 |

== Tiebreakers ==
Thursday, March 11, 8:00 pm

| Team | 1 | 2 | 3 | 4 | 5 | 6 | 7 | 8 | 9 | 10 | Final |
|---|---|---|---|---|---|---|---|---|---|---|---|
| (Minnesota) Pete Fenson 🔨 | 2 | 0 | 2 | 0 | 1 | 0 | 2 | 1 | 0 | 2 | 10 |
| (Minnesota) Matt Stevens | 0 | 2 | 0 | 1 | 0 | 2 | 0 | 0 | 2 | 0 | 7 |

| Team | 1 | 2 | 3 | 4 | 5 | 6 | 7 | 8 | 9 | 10 | Final |
|---|---|---|---|---|---|---|---|---|---|---|---|
| (New York (state)) Matt Hames | 0 | 1 | 2 | 0 | 1 | 0 | 0 | 0 | 1 | 0 | 5 |
| (Minnesota) Mike Farbelow 🔨 | 1 | 0 | 0 | 2 | 0 | 0 | 0 | 2 | 0 | 1 | 6 |

== Playoffs ==
Page playoff system
1 | (Minnesota) Pete Fenson | 10
2 | (Minnesota) Mike Farbelow | 4
3 | (Minnesota) Matt Stevens | 10
4 | (New York (state)) Matt Hames | 5

Semifinal
2 | (Minnesota) Mike Farbelow | 10
3 | (Minnesota) Matt Stevens | 5

Final
1 | (Minnesota) Pete Fenson | 8
2 | (Minnesota) Mike Farbelow | 4

=== 1 vs. 2 game ===
Friday, March 12, 12:00 pm

| Team | 1 | 2 | 3 | 4 | 5 | 6 | 7 | 8 | 9 | 10 | Final |
|---|---|---|---|---|---|---|---|---|---|---|---|
| (Minnesota) Pete Fenson | 2 | 2 | 0 | 1 | 0 | 2 | 1 | 0 | 2 | X | 10 |
| (Minnesota) Mike Farbelow 🔨 | 0 | 0 | 1 | 0 | 1 | 0 | 0 | 2 | 0 | X | 4 |

=== 3 vs. 4 game ===
Friday, March 12, 12:00 pm

| Team | 1 | 2 | 3 | 4 | 5 | 6 | 7 | 8 | 9 | 10 | Final |
|---|---|---|---|---|---|---|---|---|---|---|---|
| (New York (state)) Matt Hames | 0 | 2 | 0 | 0 | 2 | 0 | 1 | 0 | X | X | 5 |
| (Minnesota) Matt Stevens 🔨 | 5 | 0 | 2 | 1 | 0 | 1 | 0 | 1 | X | X | 10 |

=== Semifinal ===
Friday, March 12, 8:00 pm

| Team | 1 | 2 | 3 | 4 | 5 | 6 | 7 | 8 | 9 | 10 | Final |
|---|---|---|---|---|---|---|---|---|---|---|---|
| (Minnesota) Mike Farbelow 🔨 | 1 | 0 | 2 | 0 | 2 | 1 | 0 | 4 | X | X | 10 |
| (Minnesota) Matt Stevens | 0 | 1 | 0 | 2 | 0 | 0 | 2 | 0 | X | X | 5 |

=== Championship final ===
Saturday, March 13, 3:00 pm

| Team | 1 | 2 | 3 | 4 | 5 | 6 | 7 | 8 | 9 | 10 | Final |
|---|---|---|---|---|---|---|---|---|---|---|---|
| (Minnesota) Pete Fenson 🔨 | 1 | 1 | 0 | 2 | 0 | 4 | 0 | 0 | 0 | X | 8 |
| (Minnesota) Mike Farbelow | 0 | 0 | 1 | 0 | 1 | 0 | 0 | 2 | 0 | X | 4 |
