= 2021 United States Men's Curling Championship =

- Host city: Wausau, Wisconsin
- Arena: Wausau Curling Club
- Dates: May 25–30
- Winner: (Minnesota) Team Dropkin
- Skip: Korey Dropkin
- Third: Joe Polo
- Second: Mark Fenner
- Lead: Tom Howell
- Alternate: Alex Fenson
- Coach: Tim Solin
- Finalist: (Minnesota) Jed Brundidge

The 2021 United States Men's Curling Championship was held from May 25 to 30, 2021 at the Wausau Curling Club in Wausau, Wisconsin. The event was held in conjunction with the 2021 United States Women's Curling Championship.

== Impact of the COVID-19 pandemic ==
The event was originally scheduled to be held February 6 to 13 at the ImOn Ice Arena in Cedar Rapids, Iowa. In August 2020, a derecho damaged the arena and the COVID-19 pandemic caused the repairs to be delayed significantly enough to necessitate moving the championships to a different venue. In December 2020 the United States Curling Association (USCA) announced that, due to the continuing pandemic, the Men's, Women's, and Mixed Doubles National Championships would be postponed until May 2021 and would be conducted in a bio-secure bubble. Typically, the winner of the National Men's Championship would represent the United States at the World Championship, but this postponement moved the national championship after the 2021 World Men's Championship and so the USCA offered the spot at World's to the 2020 champion, Team Shuster. The site of the bubble for the championships was later announced to be Wausau Curling Club in Wausau, Wisconsin.

== Qualification ==
Due to the pandemic, no qualification events were held and the qualification methods were modified. The top ten men's teams, determined by the World Curling Federation's World Team Ranking System, were invited to compete. Typically, the qualification methods would be the top five teams from the World Team Ranking System, the top four teams from a qualification event, and one team from the Junior Championship.

== Teams ==
The ten teams competing in the championship are:

Skip	Third	Second	Lead	Alternate	Coach	Locale
Steven Birklid	Sam Galey	Matt Birklid	Erik Quistgaard	Chris Bond		(Washington (state)) Seattle, Washington
Todd Birr	Jason Smith	Jared Allen	Tom O’Connor	John Benton		Blaine, Minnesota
Jed Brundidge	Evan Workin	Lance Wheeler	Cameron Rittenour	Jarl Timothy Wagner		Saint Paul, Minnesota
Derek Corbett	Evan Jensen	Aaron Carlson	Austin Carlson	Brandon Corbett		(New York (state)) Rochester, New York
Korey Dropkin	Joe Polo	Mark Fenner	Tom Howell	Alex Fenson	Tim Solin	Chaska, Minnesota
Scott Dunnam	Hunter Clawson	Cody Clouser	Andrew Dunnam	Daniel Dudt	Bruce Clouser	Philadelphia, Pennsylvania
Riley Fenson	Samuel Strouse	Ethan Sampson	Trevor Marquardt		Derrick McLean	Chaska, Minnesota
Greg Persinger (fourth)	Alex Leichter	Dominik Märki	Craig Brown (skip)	Shawn Banyai		Fairbanks, Alaska
Rich Ruohonen	Andrew Stopera	Colin Hufman	Kroy Nernberger	Philip Tilker	Pete Annis	Minneapolis, Minnesota
Luc Violette	Chase Sinnett	Ben Richardson	Jon Harstad		Jordan Moulton	Chaska, Minnesota

== Round-robin standings ==
Final round-robin standings

Key
Teams to playoffs

Skip	W	L
(Minnesota) Korey Dropkin	7	2
(Minnesota) Jed Brundidge	6	3
(Pennsylvania) Scott Dunnam	6	3
(Minnesota) Luc Violette	6	3
(Alaska) Greg Persinger	5	4
(Washington (state)) Steven Birklid	5	4
(Minnesota) Rich Ruohonen	5	4
(Minnesota) Riley Fenson	4	5
(New York (state)) Derek Corbett	1	8
(Minnesota) Todd Birr	0	9

== Round-robin results ==
All draw times are listed in Central Daylight Time (UTC−05:00).

=== Draw 1 ===
Tuesday, May 25, 1:00 pm

Sheet 2	1	2	3	4	5	6	7	8	9	10	Final
(Minnesota) Luc Violette 🔨	2	0	0	0	2	0	2	1	0	1	8
(Washington (state)) Steven Birklid	0	2	2	1	0	0	0	0	1	0	6

Sheet 4	1	2	3	4	5	6	7	8	9	10	Final
(Minnesota) Korey Dropkin 🔨	2	1	0	4	0	2	0	2	0	X	11
(Minnesota) Jed Brundidge	0	0	3	0	1	0	3	0	2	X	9

Sheet 5	1	2	3	4	5	6	7	8	9	10	Final
(Minnesota) Rich Ruohonen 🔨	3	0	3	0	1	0	2	X	X	X	9
(Minnesota) Todd Birr	0	0	0	1	0	1	0	X	X	X	2

Sheet 6	1	2	3	4	5	6	7	8	9	10	Final
(Pennsylvania) Scott Dunnam	0	2	1	0	2	0	4	0	3	X	12
(Alaska) Greg Persinger 🔨	2	0	0	1	0	2	0	0	0	X	5

Sheet 7	1	2	3	4	5	6	7	8	9	10	Final
(New York (state)) Derek Corbett	0	1	0	0	0	1	0	X	X	X	2
(Minnesota) Riley Fenson 🔨	2	0	1	1	2	0	3	X	X	X	9

=== Draw 2 ===
Tuesday, May 25, 8:00 pm

Sheet 2	1	2	3	4	5	6	7	8	9	10	Final
(Pennsylvania) Scott Dunnam 🔨	0	3	0	2	1	0	0	1	0	2	9
(Minnesota) Riley Fenson	1	0	1	0	0	2	1	0	1	0	6

Sheet 4	1	2	3	4	5	6	7	8	9	10	Final
(Minnesota) Todd Birr 🔨	0	0	1	0	2	0	0	1	0	X	4
(Alaska) Greg Persinger	0	2	0	1	0	2	1	0	3	X	9

Sheet 5	1	2	3	4	5	6	7	8	9	10	Final
(New York (state)) Derek Corbett	0	2	0	0	0	1	1	0	1	X	5
(Minnesota) Korey Dropkin 🔨	0	0	5	1	2	0	0	1	0	X	9

Sheet 6	1	2	3	4	5	6	7	8	9	10	Final
(Minnesota) Jed Brundidge	0	2	1	1	0	2	3	0	1	X	10
(Minnesota) Luc Violette 🔨	2	0	0	0	1	0	0	2	0	X	5

Sheet 7	1	2	3	4	5	6	7	8	9	10	Final
(Washington (state)) Steven Birklid 🔨	1	0	0	1	0	1	1	0	1	1	6
(Minnesota) Rich Ruohonen	0	0	2	0	2	0	0	1	0	0	5

=== Draw 3 ===
Wednesday, May 26, 12:00 pm

Sheet 2	1	2	3	4	5	6	7	8	9	10	Final
(Minnesota) Jed Brundidge 🔨	1	1	0	3	0	2	0	1	0	X	8
(New York (state)) Derek Corbett	0	0	1	0	3	0	1	0	1	X	6

Sheet 4	1	2	3	4	5	6	7	8	9	10	Final
(Minnesota) Rich Ruohonen 🔨	0	1	1	0	2	0	2	0	2	X	8
(Pennsylvania) Scott Dunnam	0	0	0	1	0	2	0	1	0	X	4

Sheet 5	1	2	3	4	5	6	7	8	9	10	Final
(Minnesota) Riley Fenson 🔨	0	0	2	0	0	0	5	0	1	X	8
(Alaska) Greg Persinger	0	0	0	2	0	0	0	2	0	X	4

Sheet 6	1	2	3	4	5	6	7	8	9	10	Final
(Minnesota) Korey Dropkin 🔨	0	2	0	1	0	2	0	1	0	X	6
(Washington (state)) Steven Birklid	0	0	0	0	1	0	1	0	1	X	3

Sheet 7	1	2	3	4	5	6	7	8	9	10	Final
(Minnesota) Luc Violette 🔨	5	3	1	2	X	X	X	X	X	X	11
(Minnesota) Todd Birr	0	0	0	0	X	X	X	X	X	X	0

=== Draw 4 ===
Wednesday, May 26, 8:00 pm

Sheet 2	1	2	3	4	5	6	7	8	9	10	Final
(Minnesota) Rich Ruohonen	0	0	0	1	0	0	X	X	X	X	1
(Alaska) Greg Persinger 🔨	3	0	2	0	1	2	X	X	X	X	8

Sheet 4	1	2	3	4	5	6	7	8	9	10	Final
(New York (state)) Derek Corbett	0	0	0	0	0	1	0	1	0	X	2
(Minnesota) Luc Violette 🔨	1	2	1	0	0	0	1	0	2	X	7

Sheet 5	1	2	3	4	5	6	7	8	9	10	Final
(Minnesota) Jed Brundidge 🔨	1	1	0	2	0	0	1	0	2	1	8
(Washington (state)) Steven Birklid	0	0	3	0	2	1	0	3	0	0	9

Sheet 6	1	2	3	4	5	6	7	8	9	10	11	Final
(Minnesota) Riley Fenson 🔨	2	0	1	1	0	1	0	0	1	0	1	7
(Minnesota) Todd Birr	0	2	0	0	0	0	2	1	0	1	0	6

Sheet 7	1	2	3	4	5	6	7	8	9	10	Final
(Minnesota) Korey Dropkin 🔨	3	0	2	1	0	3	0	X	X	X	9
(Pennsylvania) Scott Dunnam	0	2	0	0	2	0	1	X	X	X	5

=== Draw 5 ===
Thursday, May 27, 12:00 pm

Sheet 2	1	2	3	4	5	6	7	8	9	10	Final
(Minnesota) Todd Birr	0	0	1	0	0	1	X	X	X	X	2
(Minnesota) Korey Dropkin 🔨	2	2	0	0	3	0	X	X	X	X	7

Sheet 4	1	2	3	4	5	6	7	8	9	10	Final
(Washington (state)) Steven Birklid 🔨	0	1	0	2	2	1	1	1	X	X	8
(Minnesota) Riley Fenson	1	0	1	0	0	0	0	0	X	X	2

Sheet 5	1	2	3	4	5	6	7	8	9	10	11	Final
(Minnesota) Luc Violette 🔨	0	1	0	1	0	1	0	3	0	2	0	8
(Pennsylvania) Scott Dunnam	2	0	1	0	1	0	3	0	1	0	1	9

Sheet 6	1	2	3	4	5	6	7	8	9	10	Final
(New York (state)) Derek Corbett	0	0	1	0	0	0	X	X	X	X	1
(Minnesota) Rich Ruohonen 🔨	0	2	0	1	4	1	X	X	X	X	8

Sheet 7	1	2	3	4	5	6	7	8	9	10	Final
(Minnesota) Jed Brundidge	0	1	0	2	0	0	0	0	X	X	3
(Alaska) Greg Persinger 🔨	1	0	2	0	0	2	2	1	X	X	8

=== Draw 6 ===
Thursday, May 27, 8:00 pm

Sheet 2	1	2	3	4	5	6	7	8	9	10	Final
(Minnesota) Riley Fenson	0	0	1	0	1	0	0	0	2	0	4
(Minnesota) Luc Violette 🔨	0	1	0	1	0	0	0	4	0	2	8

Sheet 4	1	2	3	4	5	6	7	8	9	10	Final
(Minnesota) Jed Brundidge	0	0	0	2	0	3	0	2	0	1	8
(Minnesota) Rich Ruohonen 🔨	0	1	2	0	1	0	1	0	0	0	5

Sheet 5	1	2	3	4	5	6	7	8	9	10	Final
(Minnesota) Todd Birr	1	0	2	0	1	0	0	1	0	0	5
(New York (state)) Derek Corbett 🔨	0	3	0	1	0	1	1	0	1	1	8

Sheet 6	1	2	3	4	5	6	7	8	9	10	Final
(Alaska) Greg Persinger	0	1	0	0	2	0	2	0	0	X	5
(Minnesota) Korey Dropkin 🔨	0	0	0	3	0	2	0	2	0	X	7

Sheet 7	1	2	3	4	5	6	7	8	9	10	Final
(Pennsylvania) Scott Dunnam 🔨	1	0	3	2	0	0	1	0	1	X	8
(Washington (state)) Steven Birklid	0	1	0	0	3	0	0	1	0	X	5

=== Draw 7 ===
Friday, May 28, 12:00 pm

Sheet 2	1	2	3	4	5	6	7	8	9	10	Final
(New York (state)) Derek Corbett	0	1	0	0	1	0	2	0	1	X	5
(Pennsylvania) Scott Dunnam 🔨	2	0	1	2	0	1	0	2	0	X	8

Sheet 4	1	2	3	4	5	6	7	8	9	10	Final
(Alaska) Greg Persinger 🔨	0	2	0	3	0	0	2	0	0	X	7
(Washington (state)) Steven Birklid	1	0	1	0	1	1	0	1	0	X	5

Sheet 5	1	2	3	4	5	6	7	8	9	10	Final
(Minnesota) Korey Dropkin 🔨	0	1	0	0	0	1	0	1	0	X	3
(Minnesota) Riley Fenson	0	0	0	0	3	0	3	0	1	X	7

Sheet 6	1	2	3	4	5	6	7	8	9	10	Final
(Minnesota) Todd Birr 🔨	0	1	1	2	0	0	0	0	0	0	4
(Minnesota) Jed Brundidge	1	0	0	0	2	1	0	1	1	3	9

Sheet 7	1	2	3	4	5	6	7	8	9	10	Final
(Minnesota) Rich Ruohonen	0	0	1	0	0	1	0	0	2	2	6
(Minnesota) Luc Violette 🔨	2	0	0	0	1	0	0	0	0	0	3

=== Draw 8 ===
Friday, May 28, 8:00 pm

Sheet 2	1	2	3	4	5	6	7	8	9	10	11	Final
(Minnesota) Korey Dropkin 🔨	0	0	0	1	0	0	2	0	0	0	1	4
(Minnesota) Rich Ruohonen	0	0	0	0	2	0	0	0	0	1	0	3

Sheet 4	1	2	3	4	5	6	7	8	9	10	Final
(Pennsylvania) Scott Dunnam 🔨	0	0	2	0	1	0	0	1	2	X	6
(Minnesota) Todd Birr	1	0	0	1	0	1	1	0	0	X	4

Sheet 5	1	2	3	4	5	6	7	8	9	10	Final
(Alaska) Greg Persinger 🔨	1	0	2	0	0	0	0	1	0	X	4
(Minnesota) Luc Violette	0	2	0	0	0	1	0	0	4	X	7

Sheet 6	1	2	3	4	5	6	7	8	9	10	Final
(Washington (state)) Steven Birklid 🔨	0	1	0	0	3	0	0	3	2	X	9
(New York (state)) Derek Corbett	0	0	1	2	0	2	1	0	0	X	6

Sheet 7	1	2	3	4	5	6	7	8	9	10	Final
(Minnesota) Riley Fenson	0	0	1	0	2	3	0	0	0	X	6
(Minnesota) Jed Brundidge 🔨	1	2	0	2	0	0	3	0	1	X	9

=== Draw 9 ===
Saturday, May 29, 12:00 pm

Sheet 2	1	2	3	4	5	6	7	8	9	10	Final
(Washington (state)) Steven Birklid	0	4	0	2	0	0	0	1	1	1	9
(Minnesota) Todd Birr 🔨	2	0	1	0	1	2	1	0	0	0	7

Sheet 4	1	2	3	4	5	6	7	8	9	10	Final
(Minnesota) Luc Violette	0	0	1	4	1	0	2	X	X	X	9
(Minnesota) Korey Dropkin 🔨	1	0	0	0	0	3	0	X	X	X	4

Sheet 5	1	2	3	4	5	6	7	8	9	10	Final
(Pennsylvania) Scott Dunnam	0	1	0	0	0	1	0	X	X	X	2
(Minnesota) Jed Brundidge 🔨	3	0	2	1	1	0	3	X	X	X	10

Sheet 6	1	2	3	4	5	6	7	8	9	10	Final
(Minnesota) Rich Ruohonen 🔨	1	2	3	0	2	1	X	X	X	X	9
(Minnesota) Riley Fenson	0	0	0	2	0	0	X	X	X	X	2

Sheet 7	1	2	3	4	5	6	7	8	9	10	Final
(Alaska) Greg Persinger	0	1	1	0	3	0	3	X	X	X	8
(New York (state)) Derek Corbett 🔨	1	0	0	1	0	2	0	X	X	X	4

== Playoffs ==
Page playoff system
1	(Minnesota) Korey Dropkin	8
2	(Minnesota) Jed Brundidge	2
3	(Pennsylvania) Scott Dunnam	4
4	(Minnesota) Luc Violette	10

Semifinal
2	(Minnesota) Jed Brundidge	8
4	(Minnesota) Luc Violette	5

Final
1	(Minnesota) Korey Dropkin	7
2	(Minnesota) Jed Brundidge	3

=== 1 vs. 2 ===
Saturday, May 29, 6:00 pm

Sheet 4	1	2	3	4	5	6	7	8	9	10	Final
(Minnesota) Korey Dropkin 🔨	2	0	2	3	0	0	1	X	X	X	8
(Minnesota) Jed Brundidge	0	1	0	0	1	0	0	X	X	X	2

=== 3 vs. 4 ===
Saturday, May 29, 6:00 pm

Sheet 5	1	2	3	4	5	6	7	8	9	10	Final
(Pennsylvania) Scott Dunnam 🔨	0	0	2	1	0	0	1	0	0	X	4
(Minnesota) Luc Violette	1	0	0	0	1	1	0	4	3	X	10

=== Semifinal ===
Sunday, May 30, 9:00 am

Sheet 4	1	2	3	4	5	6	7	8	9	10	Final
(Minnesota) Jed Brundidge 🔨	0	1	1	0	2	0	1	0	3	X	8
(Minnesota) Luc Violette	1	0	0	1	0	2	0	1	0	X	5

=== Final ===
Sunday, May 30, 7:00 pm

Sheet 4	1	2	3	4	5	6	7	8	9	10	Final
(Minnesota) Korey Dropkin 🔨	0	0	0	2	0	3	0	1	1	X	7
(Minnesota) Jed Brundidge	0	1	0	0	1	0	1	0	0	X	3

2021 United States Men's Curling Championship

Korey Dropkin
1st United States Championship title
