= 2011 Continental Cup of Curling =

2011 World Financial Group Continental Cup of Curling
- Host city: St. Albert, Alberta
- Arena: Servus Credit Union Place
- Dates: January 13–16
- Winner: Team North America
Score Breakdown
Discipline	NA	World
Mixed Doubles Round 1	18	0
Women's Team Round 1	12	6
Men's Team Round 1	12	6
Women's Team Round 2	18	0
Singles	22	10
Men's Team Round 2	18	0
Skins A	43	17
Mixed Doubles Round 2	12	6
Skins B	62	28
Women's Skins C	42	13
Men's Skins C	39	16
Total	298	102

The 2011 World Financial Group Continental Cup of Curling was held January 13–16 at the Servus Credit Union Place in St. Albert, Alberta.

It was the 7th Continental Cup, the first since December 2008. No event was held in 2009 due to the 2009 Canadian Olympic Curling Trials.

The event once again featured North America vs. the World. The North American team featured the Olympic silver medal-winning Cheryl Bernard rink, the Olympic gold medal-winning Kevin Martin rink, the current World champion rink of Kevin Koe, current Canadian champion Jennifer Jones, and Erika Brown and Pete Fenson, the current American champion rinks. The World team was represented by 2009 European champion Niklas Edin, 2010 European bronze medalist Mirjam Ott, World champion Andrea Schöpp, European champion Thomas Ulsrud, Olympic bronze medalist Wang Bingyu and a composite rink featuring former world champion David Murdoch, Olympic bronze medalist Ralph Stöckli and teammate Simon Strübin as well as 2007 World silver medalist Andreas Lang.

The North American team dominated the event, winning it outright before the final day, the second time in the history of the event. The North American team also set a record for the most points won in the history of the cup, breaking the previous record of 290 points set by the North American team in 2007.

== Teams ==
	Skip	Third	Second	Lead	Locale
Team; North; America	Cheryl Bernard	Susan O'Connor	Carolyn Darbyshire	Cori Morris	(Canada) Calgary
Team; North; America	Jennifer Jones	Kaitlyn Lawes	Jill Officer	Dawn Askin	(Canada) Winnipeg
Team; North; America	Erika Brown	Nina Spatola	Ann Swisshelm	Laura Hallisey	(United States) Madison
Team; North; America	Kevin Koe	Blake MacDonald	Carter Rycroft	Nolan Thiessen	(Canada) Edmonton
Team; North; America	Kevin Martin	John Morris	Marc Kennedy	Ben Hebert	(Canada) Edmonton
Team; North; America	Pete Fenson	Shawn Rojeski	Joe Polo	Ryan Brunt	(United States) Bemidji
Team; North; America	Coach: (Canada) Rick Lang, Captain: (Canada) Neil Harrison				
Team; World	Wang Bingyu	Liu Yin	Yue Qingshuang	Zhou Yan	(China) Harbin
Team; World	Andrea Schöpp	Monika Wagner	Corinna Scholz	Stella Heiß	(Germany) Garmisch-Partenkirchen
Team; World	Mirjam Ott	Carmen Schäfer	Carmen Küng	Janine Greiner	(Switzerland) Davos
Team; World	David Murdoch	Ralph Stöckli	Andreas Lang	Simon Strübin	(Scotland) Lockerbie (Switzerland) Basel (Germany) Füssen
Team; World	Thomas Ulsrud	Torger Nergård	Christoffer Svae	Håvard Vad Petersson	(Norway) Oslo
Team; World	Niklas Edin	Sebastian Kraupp	Fredrik Lindberg	Viktor Kjäll	(Sweden) Karlstad
Team; World	Coach: (Sweden) Peja Lindholm, Captain: (Norway) Pål Trulsen				

== Events ==
=== January 13 ===
Women's team competition 10:30 am ET

Sheet A	1	2	3	4	5	6	7	8	Final	Points
North America (Brown)	0	5	0	0	0	2	0	X	7	0
World (Wang) 🔨	1	0	2	2	2	0	2	X	9	6

Sheet B	1	2	3	4	5	6	7	8	Final	Points
North America (Bernard) 🔨	1	0	0	2	1	0	2	X	6	6
World (Schöpp)	0	0	1	0	0	1	0	X	2	0

Sheet C	1	2	3	4	5	6	7	8	Final	Points
North America (Jones)	0	0	1	0	3	0	3	2	7	6
World (Ott) 🔨	1	0	0	1	0	3	0	0	5	0

Mixed Doubles 3:30 pm

Sheet A	1	2	3	4	5	6	7	8	Final	Points
North America (Rycroft/Jones)	2	0	0	4	2	4	0	X	12	6
World (Zhou/Nergård)	0	1	2	0	0	0	1	X	4	0

Sheet B	1	2	3	4	5	6	7	8	Final	Points
North America (Martin/Swisshelm)	1	1	1	1	2	0	0	X	6	6
World (Edin/Wagner)	0	0	0	0	0	3	1	X	4	0

Sheet C	1	2	3	4	5	6	7	8	Final	Points
North America (Rojeski/O'Connor)	0	3	0	1	2	0	0	1	7	6
World (Wang/Ulsrud)	1	0	3	0	0	1	1	0	6	0

Men's team competition 9:30 pm

Sheet A	1	2	3	4	5	6	7	8	Final	Points
North America (Fenson)	1	0	0	1	1	1	0	1	5	6
World (Edin) 🔨	0	0	1	0	0	0	2	0	3	0

Sheet B	1	2	3	4	5	6	7	8	Final	Points
North America (Martin) 🔨	0	2	0	3	0	0	1	0	6	6
World (Murdoch)	0	0	2	0	0	1	0	1	4	0

Sheet C	1	2	3	4	5	6	7	8	Final	Points
North America (Koe)	1	0	1	0	0	0	0	X	2	0
World (Ulsrud) 🔨	0	1	0	1	1	1	3	X	7	6

=== January 14 ===
Women's team competition 10:30 am

Sheet A	1	2	3	4	5	6	7	8	Final	Points
North America (Bernard)	0	2	1	0	3	0	0	1	7	6
World (Ott) 🔨	1	0	0	1	0	1	2	0	5	0

Sheet B	1	2	3	4	5	6	7	8	Final	Points
North America (Jones) 🔨	4	0	2	2	0	2	0	X	10	6
World (Wang)	0	2	0	0	1	0	3	X	6	0

Sheet C	1	2	3	4	5	6	7	8	Final	Points
North America (Brown) 🔨	0	2	0	2	0	1	1	1	7	6
World (Schöpp)	0	0	2	0	3	0	0	0	5	0

Mixed doubles 3:30 pm

Sheet A	1	2	3	4	5	6	7	8	Final	Points
North America (MacDonald/Officer)	1	0	3	0	0	2	0	0	6	6
World (Ott/Stöckli)	0	1	0	1	1	0	1	1	5	0

Sheet B	1	2	3	4	5	6	7	8	Final	Points
North America (Hebert/Bernard)	1	1	0	2	2	0	0	X	6	6
World (Kraupp/Schöpp)	0	0	1	0	0	1	1	X	3	0

Sheet C	1	2	3	4	5	6	7	8	Final	Points
North America (Fenson/Brown)	2	0	0	1	0	0	1	X	4	0
World (Schäfer/Murdoch)	0	3	1	0	3	2	0	X	9	6

Men's team competition 9:30 pm

Sheet A	1	2	3	4	5	6	7	8	Final	Points
North America (Koe)	0	2	1	0	1	0	2	X	6	6
World (Murdoch) 🔨	1	0	0	1	0	1	0	X	3	0

Sheet B	1	2	3	4	5	6	7	8	Final	Points
North America (Martin) 🔨	3	1	0	2	0	3	0	X	9	6
World (Edin)	0	0	2	0	1	0	1	X	4	0

Sheet C	1	2	3	4	5	6	7	8	Final	Points
North America (Fenson)	0	2	2	0	3	0	2	X	9	6
World (Ulsrud) 🔨	1	0	0	2	0	1	0	X	4	0

=== January 15 ===
'A' Skins' 11:00 am

Team	1	2	3	4	5	6	7	8	Points
North America (Brown) 🔨	X	X		X		X		X	20
World (Schöpp)			0		0		0		0

Team	1	2	3	4	5	6	7	8	Points
North America (Koe/O'Connor/Thiessen/C. Morris)	X		X	X	X		X	X	20
World (Ulsrud/Schäfer/Edin/Liu) 🔨		0				0			0

Team	1	2	3	4	5	6	7	8	Points
North America (Fenson)	X		0		X		0		3
World (Murdoch) 🔨		X		X		0		X	17

Singles 4:00 pm

Sheet A	Runthrough	Button	Port	Raise	Hit-and-Roll	Double	Total	Points
World (Ott)	0	4	4	5	3	0	16	2
North America (Jones)	0	4	5	2	1	4	16	2

Sheet B	Runthrough	Button	Port	Raise	Hit-and-Roll	Double	Total	Points
World (Schöpp)	5	3	0	0	2	5	15	4
North America (Bernard)	0	3	4	3	4	0	14	0

Sheet C	Runthrough	Button	Port	Raise	Hit-and-Roll	Double	Total	Points
World (Wang)	0	2	5	2	1	0	10	0
North America (Brown)	0	5	5	0	1	0	11	4

Sheet A	Runthrough	Button	Port	Raise	Hit-and-Roll	Double	Total	Points
World (Edin)	0	5	3	5	1	4	18	0
North America (Fenson)	0	4	4	3	5	5	21	4

Sheet B	Runthrough	Button	Port	Raise	Hit-and-Roll	Double	Total	Points
World (Murdoch)	1	5	5	3	1	1	16	0
North America (Martin)	5	5	5	5	2	5	27	4

The Kevin Martin rink tied with the record for the most points (at 27 points) in a singles match, set in 2002 by Kevin Martin.

Sheet C	Runthrough	Button	Port	Raise	Hit-and-Roll	Double	Total	Points
World (Ulsrud)	1	5	5	5	4	1	21	4
North America (Koe)	1	3	4	4	2	5	19	0

North America receives a bonus of 8 points for having the most aggregate points in the singles.

'B' Skins 9:30 pm

Team	1	2	3	4	5	6	7	8	Points
North America (Jones)			0		0		0	X	22
World (Ott) 🔨	0	X		X		0			8

Team	1	2	3	4	5	6	7	8	Button	Points
North America (J. Morris/Swisshelm/Kennedy/Spatola)		X			X		X		X	19
World (Murdoch/Schöpp/Nergård/Wang) 🔨	X		0	X		X		0		11

With John Morris' draw to the button, North America gained nine points and clinched the Continental Cup at 208 points.

Team	1	2	3	4	5	6	7	8	Points
North America (Koe) 🔨	X	X		0		X	X	X	21
World (Edin)			X		X				9

=== January 16 ===
Women's 'C' Skins 1:00 pm

Team	1	2	3	4	5	6	7	8	Points
North America (Bernard)		0		X		X	X	X	42
World (Wang) 🔨	0		X		0				13

Men's 'C' Skins 8:00 pm

Team	1	2	3	4	5	6	7	8	Points
North America (Martin)		X		0		0	X		39
World (Ulsrud) 🔨	X		0		0			X	16

The Kevin Martin rink wins CAD$13,000 for his win in the men's skins game.
