= 2013 United States Men's Curling Championship =

- Host city: Green Bay, Wisconsin
- Arena: Cornerstone Community Center
- Dates: February 9–16
- Winner: (Washington (state)) Brady Clark
- Curling club: Granite CC, Seattle
- Skip: Brady Clark
- Third: Sean Beighton
- Second: Darren Lehto
- Lead: Philip Tilker
- Alternate: Steve Lundeen
- Finalist: (Minnesota) Tyler George

The 2013 United States Men's Curling Championship was held from February 9 to 16 at the Cornerstone Community Center in Green Bay, Wisconsin. It was held in conjunction with the 2013 United States Women's Curling Championship. The winning team represented the United States at the 2013 World Men's Curling Championship in Victoria, British Columbia, Canada. The championship also acted as a qualifier to the 2014 United States Olympic Curling Trials, awarding qualifying spots to the winners and runners-up of the championship.

== Road to the Nationals ==
A total of ten teams qualified to participate in the men's national championship through the High Performance Program, through the World Curling Tour Order of Merit, or through a challenge round.

== Teams ==
Ten teams participated in the national championship. The teams are listed as follows:

Skip	Third	Second	Lead	Alternate	Locale	Qualification method
Pete Fenson	Shawn Rojeski	Joe Polo	Ryan Brunt		Bemidji, Minnesota	High Performance Program team
Heath McCormick	Bill Stopera	Martin Sather	Dean Gemmell	Matt Hames	(New York (state)) New York, New York	High Performance Program team
Chris Plys (fourth)	Tyler George (skip)	Richard Ruohonen	Colin Hufman		Duluth, Minnesota	Order of Merit
John Shuster	Jeff Isaacson	Jared Zezel	John Landsteiner		Duluth, Minnesota	Order of Merit
Craig Brown	Kroy Nernberger	Matt Hamilton	Jon Brunt		Madison, Wisconsin	Challenge Round
Greg Persinger	Nicholas Myers	Sean Murray	Tim Gartner		Fairbanks, Alaska	Challenge Round
Ryan Lemke	Nate Gebert	John Lilla	Casey Konopacky		Medford, Wisconsin	Challenge Round
Brady Clark	Sean Beighton	Darren Lehto	Philip Tilker	Steve Lundeen	(Washington (state)) Seattle, Washington	Challenge Round
Mike Farbelow	Kevin Deeren	Kraig Deeren	Mark Lazar		St. Paul, Minnesota	Challenge Round
Todd Birr	Doug Pottinger	Greg Romaniuk	Thomas O'Connor	Kevin Birr	Mankato, Minnesota	Challenge Round

== Round-robin standings ==
Final round-robin standings

Key
Teams to playoffs
Teams to tiebreakers

Skip	W	L	PF	PA	Ends won	Ends Lost	Blank ends	Stolen ends	Shot pct.
(Minnesota) Tyler George	7	2	67	41	41	29	8	13	83%
(Minnesota) John Shuster	7	2	64	45	38	33	10	11	82%
(Washington (state)) Brady Clark	5	4	57	52	40	32	6	10	75%
(Minnesota) Pete Fenson	5	4	50	56	33	38	11	6	79%
(New York (state)) Heath McCormick	5	4	59	43	36	27	10	11	78%
(Wisconsin) Craig Brown	5	4	64	58	35	39	12	5	81%
(Minnesota) Mike Farbelow	5	4	56	55	36	30	8	12	77%
(Alaska) Greg Persinger	3	6	38	60	27	37	9	3	72%
(Minnesota) Todd Birr	3	6	52	60	35	42	7	10	77%
(Wisconsin) Ryan Lemke	0	9	35	75	25	39	11	6	74%

== Round-robin results ==
All draw times are listed in Central Standard Time (UTC−6).

=== Draw 1 ===
Saturday, February 9, 8:30 pm

Sheet A	1	2	3	4	5	6	7	8	9	10	Final
(New York (state)) Heath McCormick 🔨	1	1	2	0	3	2	X	X	X	X	9
(Minnesota) Todd Birr	0	0	0	1	0	0	X	X	X	X	1

Sheet B	1	2	3	4	5	6	7	8	9	10	11	Final
(Wisconsin) Craig Brown	0	2	0	3	0	0	1	0	0	1	0	7
(Minnesota) Pete Fenson 🔨	2	0	1	0	1	1	0	1	1	0	1	8

Sheet C	1	2	3	4	5	6	7	8	9	10	Final
(Minnesota) Tyler George 🔨	1	0	0	2	0	2	0	2	1	0	8
(Washington (state)) Brady Clark	0	3	1	0	2	0	1	0	0	2	9

Sheet D	1	2	3	4	5	6	7	8	9	10	Final
(Wisconsin) Ryan Lemke	0	0	1	1	0	1	0	0	1	1	5
(Alaska) Greg Persinger 🔨	0	2	0	0	2	0	1	1	0	0	6

Sheet E	1	2	3	4	5	6	7	8	9	10	Final
(Minnesota) Mike Farbelow	0	2	0	0	0	1	1	1	0	X	5
(Minnesota) John Shuster 🔨	2	0	0	3	1	0	0	0	2	X	8

=== Draw 2 ===
Sunday, February 9, 12:00 pm

Sheet A	1	2	3	4	5	6	7	8	9	10	Final
(Minnesota) John Shuster	0	1	0	0	1	0	0	1	0	X	3
(Washington (state)) Brady Clark 🔨	1	0	1	1	0	2	1	0	1	X	7

Sheet B	1	2	3	4	5	6	7	8	9	10	Final
(Minnesota) Mike Farbelow	0	1	0	0	1	0	1	0	2	0	5
(Minnesota) Todd Birr 🔨	1	0	2	0	0	2	0	2	0	2	9

Sheet C	1	2	3	4	5	6	7	8	9	10	Final
(Alaska) Greg Persinger	0	0	1	0	1	0	0	1	0	X	3
(Minnesota) Pete Fenson 🔨	1	0	0	1	0	2	0	0	0	X	4

Sheet D	1	2	3	4	5	6	7	8	9	10	Final
(Minnesota) Tyler George 🔨	1	0	3	0	3	0	1	0	1	X	9
(Wisconsin) Craig Brown	0	2	0	1	0	1	0	1	0	X	5

Sheet E	1	2	3	4	5	6	7	8	9	10	Final
(Wisconsin) Ryan Lemke	0	0	2	0	1	0	X	X	X	X	3
(New York (state)) Heath McCormick 🔨	0	3	0	4	0	2	X	X	X	X	9

=== Draw 3 ===
Sunday, February 9, 8:00 pm

Sheet A	1	2	3	4	5	6	7	8	9	10	Final
(Minnesota) Tyler George	0	1	0	1	0	0	0	1	0	X	3
(Minnesota) Pete Fenson 🔨	0	0	1	0	3	0	0	0	2	X	6

Sheet B	1	2	3	4	5	6	7	8	9	10	Final
(Washington (state)) Brady Clark 🔨	3	1	0	0	2	0	0	1	2	X	9
(Wisconsin) Ryan Lemke	0	0	2	0	0	0	2	0	0	X	4

Sheet C	1	2	3	4	5	6	7	8	9	10	Final
(Wisconsin) Craig Brown	0	0	0	0	2	0	2	0	2	0	6
(Minnesota) John Shuster 🔨	1	0	0	1	0	2	0	2	0	1	7

Sheet D	1	2	3	4	5	6	7	8	9	10	Final
(Minnesota) Mike Farbelow	0	1	0	1	0	1	0	0	X	X	3
(New York (state)) Heath McCormick 🔨	0	0	2	0	2	0	3	2	X	X	9

Sheet E	1	2	3	4	5	6	7	8	9	10	Final
(Alaska) Greg Persinger	1	0	1	0	0	1	0	1	0	2	6
(Minnesota) Todd Birr 🔨	0	1	0	1	0	0	1	0	1	0	4

=== Draw 4 ===
Monday, February 10, 12:00 pm

Sheet A	1	2	3	4	5	6	7	8	9	10	11	Final
(Minnesota) Todd Birr 🔨	0	0	2	1	0	0	2	0	1	1	0	7
(Wisconsin) Craig Brown	3	1	0	0	2	0	0	1	0	0	1	8

Sheet B	1	2	3	4	5	6	7	8	9	10	Final
(New York (state)) Heath McCormick 🔨	3	0	1	1	0	2	X	X	X	X	7
(Alaska) Greg Persinger	0	0	0	0	1	0	X	X	X	X	1

Sheet C	1	2	3	4	5	6	7	8	9	10	Final
(Minnesota) Mike Farbelow 🔨	2	1	0	4	0	2	0	X	X	X	9
(Wisconsin) Ryan Lemke	0	0	1	0	2	0	1	X	X	X	4

Sheet D	1	2	3	4	5	6	7	8	9	10	Final
(Washington (state)) Brady Clark 🔨	2	0	2	2	1	1	X	X	X	X	8
(Minnesota) Pete Fenson	0	1	0	0	0	0	X	X	X	X	1

Sheet E	1	2	3	4	5	6	7	8	9	10	Final
(Minnesota) John Shuster	0	1	0	1	0	1	0	0	2	0	5
(Minnesota) Tyler George 🔨	1	0	1	0	1	0	1	1	0	1	6

=== Draw 5 ===
Monday, February 10, 8:00 pm

Sheet A	1	2	3	4	5	6	7	8	9	10	Final
(Alaska) Greg Persinger 🔨	2	0	0	0	0	1	0	0	X	X	3
(Minnesota) Tyler George	0	2	1	1	2	0	0	3	X	X	9

Sheet B	1	2	3	4	5	6	7	8	9	10	Final
(Wisconsin) Ryan Lemke	0	0	0	1	2	0	0	0	X	X	3
(Wisconsin) Craig Brown 🔨	0	0	2	0	0	3	0	4	X	X	9

Sheet C	1	2	3	4	5	6	7	8	9	10	Final
(Washington (state)) Brady Clark 🔨	1	0	3	0	1	1	0	0	1	X	7
(New York (state)) Heath McCormick	0	2	0	1	0	0	0	1	0	X	4

Sheet D	1	2	3	4	5	6	7	8	9	10	Final
(Minnesota) Todd Birr	0	0	1	2	1	0	0	0	2	0	6
(Minnesota) John Shuster 🔨	2	2	0	0	0	1	0	1	0	1	7

Sheet E	1	2	3	4	5	6	7	8	9	10	11	Final
(Minnesota) Pete Fenson	0	2	0	4	1	0	0	0	0	1	0	8
(Minnesota) Mike Farbelow 🔨	2	0	2	0	0	1	1	2	0	0	1	9

=== Draw 6 ===
Tuesday, February 11, 2:00 pm

Sheet A	1	2	3	4	5	6	7	8	9	10	Final
(Washington (state)) Brady Clark	1	0	0	1	0	1	0	0	X	X	3
(Minnesota) Mike Farbelow 🔨	0	2	1	0	4	0	1	1	X	X	9

Sheet B	1	2	3	4	5	6	7	8	9	10	Final
(Minnesota) John Shuster	0	0	0	0	1	0	2	1	0	2	6
(New York (state)) Heath McCormick 🔨	1	0	1	1	0	1	0	0	1	0	5

Sheet C	1	2	3	4	5	6	7	8	9	10	Final
(Minnesota) Todd Birr 🔨	0	0	0	0	1	0	2	1	1	0	5
(Minnesota) Tyler George	3	1	1	1	0	1	0	0	0	1	8

Sheet D	1	2	3	4	5	6	7	8	9	10	Final
(Minnesota) Pete Fenson 🔨	1	0	2	0	1	0	1	1	0	1	7
(Wisconsin) Ryan Lemke	0	1	0	0	0	2	0	0	2	0	5

Sheet E	1	2	3	4	5	6	7	8	9	10	Final
(Wisconsin) Craig Brown	0	3	0	1	0	2	0	1	0	2	9
(Alaska) Greg Persinger 🔨	1	0	2	0	2	0	2	0	1	0	8

=== Draw 7 ===
Wednesday, February 12, 8:00 am

Sheet A	1	2	3	4	5	6	7	8	9	10	Final
(Minnesota) Pete Fenson 🔨	1	0	0	0	1	0	2	0	3	0	7
(New York (state)) Heath McCormick	0	2	1	1	0	2	0	1	0	1	8

Sheet B	1	2	3	4	5	6	7	8	9	10	Final
(Minnesota) Todd Birr	1	0	0	3	2	0	1	0	X	X	7
(Washington (state)) Brady Clark 🔨	0	1	0	0	0	1	0	1	X	X	3

Sheet C	1	2	3	4	5	6	7	8	9	10	Final
(Minnesota) John Shuster 🔨	5	1	0	0	0	4	X	X	X	X	10
(Alaska) Greg Persinger	0	0	1	1	0	0	X	X	X	X	2

Sheet D	1	2	3	4	5	6	7	8	9	10	Final
(Wisconsin) Craig Brown 🔨	0	0	3	0	0	0	0	1	0	X	4
(Minnesota) Mike Farbelow	0	0	0	1	0	1	2	0	3	X	7

Sheet E	1	2	3	4	5	6	7	8	9	10	Final
(Minnesota) Tyler George 🔨	2	0	3	0	2	1	X	X	X	X	8
(Wisconsin) Ryan Lemke	0	0	0	1	0	0	X	X	X	X	1

=== Draw 8 ===
Wednesday, February 12, 4:00 pm

Sheet A	1	2	3	4	5	6	7	8	9	10	Final
(Wisconsin) Ryan Lemke	0	2	0	0	0	2	0	0	0	X	4
(Minnesota) John Shuster 🔨	2	0	1	2	1	0	0	2	2	X	10

Sheet B	1	2	3	4	5	6	7	8	9	10	Final
(Minnesota) Tyler George 🔨	3	0	0	4	0	1	1	X	X	X	9
(Minnesota) Mike Farbelow	0	1	0	0	1	0	0	X	X	X	2

Sheet C	1	2	3	4	5	6	7	8	9	10	Final
(New York (state)) Heath McCormick	0	1	0	0	0	2	0	0	X	X	3
(Wisconsin) Craig Brown 🔨	0	0	1	0	2	0	3	2	X	X	8

Sheet D	1	2	3	4	5	6	7	8	9	10	Final
(Alaska) Greg Persinger	0	1	0	0	3	0	1	0	3	X	8
(Washington (state)) Brady Clark 🔨	1	0	2	0	0	1	0	1	0	X	5

Sheet E	1	2	3	4	5	6	7	8	9	10	Final
(Minnesota) Todd Birr	0	1	0	2	1	0	0	0	1	X	5
(Minnesota) Pete Fenson 🔨	1	0	2	0	0	3	2	0	0	X	8

=== Draw 9 ===
Thursday, February 13, 8:00 am

Sheet A	1	2	3	4	5	6	7	8	9	10	Final
(Minnesota) Mike Farbelow 🔨	1	2	1	0	3	X	X	X	X	X	7
(Alaska) Greg Persinger	0	0	0	1	0	X	X	X	X	X	1

Sheet B	1	2	3	4	5	6	7	8	9	10	Final
(Minnesota) Pete Fenson	0	1	0	0	0	0	0	X	X	X	1
(Minnesota) John Shuster 🔨	1	0	0	2	0	4	1	X	X	X	8

Sheet C	1	2	3	4	5	6	7	8	9	10	Final
(Wisconsin) Ryan Lemke	1	1	0	1	0	2	0	1	0	0	6
(Minnesota) Todd Birr 🔨	0	0	2	0	4	0	0	0	1	1	8

Sheet D	1	2	3	4	5	6	7	8	9	10	Final
(New York (state)) Heath McCormick	0	1	0	0	2	1	0	0	1	X	5
(Minnesota) Tyler George 🔨	2	0	0	3	0	0	0	2	0	X	7

Sheet E	1	2	3	4	5	6	7	8	9	10	Final
(Washington (state)) Brady Clark	0	2	0	0	1	0	1	0	2	0	6
(Wisconsin) Craig Brown 🔨	2	0	0	3	0	1	0	1	0	1	8

== Tiebreakers ==
Semifinals		To Playoffs
		(Minnesota) Mike Farbelow	6
(New York (state)) Heath McCormick	7	(New York (state)) Heath McCormick	9
(Minnesota) Pete Fenson	5

To Playoffs
1	(Washington (state)) Brady Clark	9
2	(Wisconsin) Craig Brown	8

Thursday, February 14, 2:00 pm

Team	1	2	3	4	5	6	7	8	9	10	Final
(New York (state)) Heath McCormick	0	0	2	0	1	0	1	0	3	X	7
(Minnesota) Pete Fenson 🔨	2	0	0	1	0	1	0	1	0	X	5

Player percentages
(New York (state)) Heath McCormick		(Minnesota) Pete Fenson	
Dean Gemmell	86%	Ryan Brunt	79%
Martin Sather	82%	Joe Polo	83%
Bill Stopera	84%	Shawn Rojeski	72%
Heath McCormick	87%	Pete Fenson	80%
Total	85%	Total	79%

Team	1	2	3	4	5	6	7	8	9	10	11	Final
(Wisconsin) Craig Brown 🔨	0	2	0	1	2	0	0	2	0	1	0	8
(Washington (state)) Brady Clark	1	0	2	0	0	1	1	0	3	0	1	9

Player percentages
(Wisconsin) Craig Brown		(Washington (state)) Brady Clark	
Jon Brunt	87%	Phil Tilker	78%
Matt Hamilton	77%	Darren Lehto	82%
Kroy Nernberger	74%	Sean Beighton	84%
Craig Brown	80%	Brady Clark	89%
Total	79%	Total	83%

Thursday, February 14, 8:00 pm

Team	1	2	3	4	5	6	7	8	9	10	Final
(New York (state)) Heath McCormick 🔨	0	0	2	0	0	3	0	3	0	1	9
(Minnesota) Mike Farbelow	2	1	0	1	0	0	1	0	1	0	6

Player percentages
(New York (state)) Heath McCormick		(Minnesota) Mike Farbelow	
Dean Gemmell	70%	Mark Lazar	85%
Martin Sather	81%	Kraig Deeren	83%
Bill Stopera	84%	Kevin Deeren	60%
Heath McCormick	80%	Mike Farbelow	68%
Total	79%	Total	74%

== Playoffs ==
Page playoff system
1	(Minnesota) Tyler George	6
2	(Minnesota) John Shuster	4
3	(Washington (state)) Brady Clark	7
4	(New York (state)) Heath McCormick	4

Semifinal
2	(Minnesota) John Shuster	5
3	(Washington (state)) Brady Clark	6

Final
1	(Minnesota) Tyler George	5
3	(Washington (state)) Brady Clark	6

=== 1 vs. 2 ===
Friday, February 14, 9:00 am

Team	1	2	3	4	5	6	7	8	9	10	Final
(Minnesota) Tyler George 🔨	0	2	1	1	0	1	0	0	0	1	6
(Minnesota) John Shuster	0	0	0	0	2	0	1	0	1	0	4

Player percentages
(Minnesota) Tyler George		(Minnesota) John Shuster	
Colin Hufman	76%	John Landsteiner	76%
Richard Ruohonen	83%	Jared Zezel	77%
Tyler George	80%	Jeff Isaacson	92%
Chris Plys	85%	John Shuster	70%
Total	81%	Total	79%

=== 3 vs. 4 ===
Friday, February 14, 9:00 am

Team	1	2	3	4	5	6	7	8	9	10	Final
(Washington (state)) Brady Clark	0	2	0	1	0	2	0	1	1	X	7
(New York (state)) Heath McCormick 🔨	1	0	1	0	2	0	0	0	0	X	4

Player percentages
(Washington (state)) Brady Clark		(New York (state)) Heath McCormick	
Phil Tilker	79%	Dean Gemmell	82%
Darren Lehto	78%	Martin Sather	73%
Sean Beighton	73%	Bill Stopera	85%
Brady Clark	82%	Heath McCormick	70%
Total	78%	Total	77%

=== Semifinal ===
Friday, February 14, 8:00 pm

Team	1	2	3	4	5	6	7	8	9	10	Final
(Minnesota) John Shuster 🔨	0	2	0	0	2	0	1	0	0	0	5
(Washington (state)) Brady Clark	1	0	0	1	0	1	0	2	0	1	6

Player percentages
(Minnesota) John Shuster		(Washington (state)) Brady Clark	
John Landsteiner	80%	Phil Tilker	84%
Jared Zezel	93%	Darren Lehto	75%
Jeff Isaacson	93%	Sean Beighton	92%
John Shuster	63%	Brady Clark	68%
Total	82%	Total	80%

=== Final ===
Saturday, February 15, 3:00 pm

Team	1	2	3	4	5	6	7	8	9	10	Final
(Minnesota) Tyler George 🔨	0	1	0	1	0	0	0	3	0	0	5
(Washington (state)) Brady Clark	0	0	1	0	1	1	1	0	0	2	6

Player percentages
(Minnesota) Tyler George		(Washington (state)) Brady Clark	
Colin Hufman	86%	Phil Tilker	82%
Richard Ruohonen	84%	Darren Lehto	84%
Tyler George	73%	Sean Beighton	71%
Chris Plys	65%	Brady Clark	77%
Total	77%	Total	79%
