= 2014 United States Men's Curling Championship =

- Host city: Philadelphia, Pennsylvania
- Arena: IceWorks Skating Complex
- Dates: March 1–8
- Winner: (Minnesota) Pete Fenson
- Curling club: Bemidji CC, Bemidji
- Skip: Pete Fenson
- Third: Shawn Rojeski
- Second: Joe Polo
- Lead: Ryan Brunt
- Finalist: (Wisconsin) Craig Brown

The 2014 Labatt United States Men's Curling Championship was held from March 1 to 8 at the IceWorks Skating Complex in Philadelphia, Pennsylvania. It was held in conjunction with the 2014 United States Women's Curling Championship.

== Road to the Nationals ==
A total of ten teams qualified to participate in the men's national championship through the High Performance Program, through the World Curling Tour Order of Merit, or through a challenge round.

== Teams ==
Ten teams participated in the national championship. The teams are listed as follows:

Skip	Third	Second	Lead	Alternate	Locale	Qualification method
John Shuster	Jeff Isaacson	Jared Zezel	John Landsteiner		Duluth, Minnesota	High Performance Program committee selection
Pete Fenson	Shawn Rojeski	Joe Polo	Ryan Brunt		Bemidji, Minnesota	High Performance Program committee selection
Brady Clark	Sean Beighton	Greg Persinger	Philip Tilker		(Washington (state)) Seattle, Washington	Order of Merit
Heath McCormick	Chris Plys	Rich Ruohonen	Colin Hufman		(New York (state)) New York, New York	Order of Merit
Paul Pustovar	Joseph Bonfoey	Paul Lyttle	Harold Rutan	Ted Trolson	Duluth, Minnesota	Challenge Round
Craig Brown	Kroy Nernberger	Matt Hamilton	Jon Brunt		Madison, Wisconsin	Challenge Round
Tyler George	Bill Stopera	Dean Gemmell	Martin Sather		Duluth, Minnesota	Challenge Round
Alex Leichter	Brandon Corbett	Derek Corbett	Jeff Pulli		(New York (state)) Rochester, New York	Challenge Round
Peter Stolt	Brad Caldwell	Erik Ordway	Clayton Orvik	Stephen Dropkin	Plymouth, Minnesota	Challenge Round
Eric Fenson	Josh Bahr	Jon Chandler	Mark Haluptzok	Riley Fenson	Bemidji, Minnesota	Challenge Round

== Round-robin standings ==
Final round-robin standings

Key
Teams to playoffs

Skip	W	L	PF	PA	Ends won	Ends Lost	Blank ends	Stolen ends	Shot pct.
(Wisconsin) Craig Brown	7	2	58	40	31	29	13	7	86%
(New York (state)) Heath McCormick	7	2	59	43	34	25	12	10	83%
(Minnesota) Pete Fenson	6	3	55	41	30	33	17	11	85%
(Washington (state)) Brady Clark	6	3	59	53	40	37	10	9	82%
(Minnesota) John Shuster	5	4	58	53	34	32	12	5	85%
(Minnesota) Tyler George	4	5	54	55	35	36	11	8	80%
(New York (state)) Alex Leichter	3	6	43	60	29	35	16	7	80%
(Minnesota) Peter Stolt	3	6	41	61	33	34	11	10	77%
(Minnesota) Paul Pustovar	2	7	48	60	37	35	9	8	73%
(Minnesota) Eric Fenson	2	7	50	62	32	39	9	7	75%

== Round-robin results ==
All draw times are listed in Eastern Standard Time (UTC−7).

=== Draw 1 ===
Saturday, March 1, 8:30 pm

Sheet 1	1	2	3	4	5	6	7	8	9	10	Final
(Minnesota) Peter Stolt	0	2	1	0	1	1	0	1	1	1	8
(Minnesota) Tyler George	2	0	0	1	0	0	3	0	0	0	6

Sheet 2	1	2	3	4	5	6	7	8	9	10	Final
(Minnesota) John Shuster	3	0	2	0	3	0	0	1	0	1	10
(Washington (state)) Brady Clark	0	1	0	1	0	0	3	0	3	0	8

Sheet 3	1	2	3	4	5	6	7	8	9	10	Final
(Minnesota) Pete Fenson	0	0	0	1	0	2	0	4	X	X	7
(Wisconsin) Craig Brown	0	0	0	0	1	0	1	0	X	X	2

Sheet 4	1	2	3	4	5	6	7	8	9	10	Final
(New York (state)) Alex Leichter	2	0	2	1	0	0	0	0	0	1	6
(Minnesota) Eric Fenson	0	0	0	0	0	1	2	1	0	0	4

Sheet 5	1	2	3	4	5	6	7	8	9	10	Final
(Minnesota) Paul Pustovar	0	0	1	0	1	0	1	0	2	X	5
(New York (state)) Heath McCormick	0	1	0	3	0	3	0	1	0	X	8

=== Draw 2 ===
Sunday, March 2, 12:00 pm

Sheet 1	1	2	3	4	5	6	7	8	9	10	Final
(New York (state)) Heath McCormick	0	1	0	1	0	X	X	X	X	X	2
(Wisconsin) Craig Brown	0	0	4	0	5	X	X	X	X	X	9

Sheet 2	1	2	3	4	5	6	7	8	9	10	Final
(Minnesota) Paul Pustovar	0	0	1	0	2	0	2	0	2	0	7
(Minnesota) Tyler George	2	0	0	2	0	2	0	2	0	1	9

Sheet 3	1	2	3	4	5	6	7	8	9	10	Final
(Minnesota) Eric Fenson	0	2	0	1	0	1	1	0	2	0	7
(Washington (state)) Brady Clark	2	0	3	0	1	0	0	1	0	1	8

Sheet 4	1	2	3	4	5	6	7	8	9	10	Final
(Minnesota) Pete Fenson	2	0	0	0	2	1	0	0	0	0	5
(Minnesota) John Shuster	0	0	0	3	0	0	1	1	0	1	6

Sheet 5	1	2	3	4	5	6	7	8	9	10	Final
(New York (state)) Alex Leichter	0	4	1	0	1	0	1	0	0	X	7
(Minnesota) Peter Stolt	0	0	0	1	0	2	0	1	1	X	5

=== Draw 3 ===
Sunday, March 2, 8:00 pm

Sheet 1	1	2	3	4	5	6	7	8	9	10	Final
(Minnesota) Pete Fenson	0	0	0	2	1	2	0	0	2	X	7
(Washington (state)) Brady Clark	0	1	1	0	0	0	1	1	0	X	4

Sheet 2	1	2	3	4	5	6	7	8	9	10	Final
(Wisconsin) Craig Brown	0	2	2	0	0	3	X	X	X	X	7
(New York (state)) Alex Leichter	0	0	0	0	1	0	X	X	X	X	1

Sheet 3	1	2	3	4	5	6	7	8	9	10	Final
(Minnesota) John Shuster	1	0	0	0	1	0	0	1	0	X	3
(New York (state)) Heath McCormick	0	0	1	0	0	2	1	0	1	X	5

Sheet 4	1	2	3	4	5	6	7	8	9	10	Final
(Minnesota) Paul Pustovar	2	0	1	1	0	0	0	0	0	X	4
(Minnesota) Peter Stolt	0	2	0	0	1	0	2	0	1	X	6

Sheet 5	1	2	3	4	5	6	7	8	9	10	Final
(Minnesota) Eric Fenson	1	0	1	0	0	1	0	1	0	X	4
(Minnesota) Tyler George	0	1	0	3	1	0	1	0	1	X	7

=== Draw 4 ===
Monday, March 3, 4:00 pm

Sheet 1	1	2	3	4	5	6	7	8	9	10	Final
(Minnesota) Tyler George	1	0	2	4	0	1	0	1	X	X	9
(Minnesota) John Shuster	0	2	0	0	1	0	2	0	X	X	5

Sheet 2	1	2	3	4	5	6	7	8	9	10	Final
(Minnesota) Peter Stolt	0	0	3	1	0	0	0	1	1	0	6
(Minnesota) Eric Fenson	1	0	0	0	2	1	0	0	0	1	5

Sheet 3	1	2	3	4	5	6	7	8	9	10	Final
(Minnesota) Paul Pustovar	1	0	0	1	0	0	2	0	1	1	6
(New York (state)) Alex Leichter	0	2	0	0	1	1	0	1	0	0	5

Sheet 4	1	2	3	4	5	6	7	8	9	10	Final
(Wisconsin) Craig Brown	1	0	0	0	1	0	0	1	0	X	3
(Washington (state)) Brady Clark	0	1	1	1	0	1	2	0	1	X	7

Sheet 5	1	2	3	4	5	6	7	8	9	10	Final
(New York (state)) Heath McCormick	1	0	1	0	0	1	1	0	2	0	6
(Minnesota) Pete Fenson	0	0	0	2	2	0	0	1	0	2	7

=== Draw 5 ===
Tuesday, March 4, 8:00 am

Sheet 1	1	2	3	4	5	6	7	8	9	10	Final
(Minnesota) Eric Fenson	0	1	0	3	0	1	0	1	0	1	7
(Minnesota) Pete Fenson	0	0	1	0	2	0	3	0	0	0	6

Sheet 2	1	2	3	4	5	6	7	8	9	10	Final
(New York (state)) Alex Leichter	0	0	0	0	1	0	X	X	X	X	1
(Minnesota) John Shuster	0	3	3	1	0	2	X	X	X	X	9

Sheet 3	1	2	3	4	5	6	7	8	9	10	Final
(Wisconsin) Craig Brown	2	0	2	0	4	0	0	2	X	X	10
(Minnesota) Peter Stolt	0	1	0	1	0	0	2	0	X	X	4

Sheet 4	1	2	3	4	5	6	7	8	9	10	Final
(Minnesota) Tyler George	0	0	1	0	0	2	0	1	X	X	4
(New York (state)) Heath McCormick	0	2	0	2	3	0	1	0	X	X	8

Sheet 5	1	2	3	4	5	6	7	8	9	10	Final
(Washington (state)) Brady Clark	1	0	1	1	0	2	0	1	0	0	6
(Minnesota) Paul Pustovar	0	1	0	0	1	0	1	0	0	1	4

=== Draw 6 ===
Tuesday, March 4, 4:00 pm

Sheet 1	1	2	3	4	5	6	7	8	9	10	Final
(Wisconsin) Craig Brown	0	3	0	2	0	0	1	0	0	2	8
(Minnesota) Paul Pustovar	1	0	1	0	0	2	0	2	1	0	7

Sheet 2	1	2	3	4	5	6	7	8	9	10	Final
(New York (state)) Heath McCormick	3	0	4	0	0	1	X	X	X	X	8
(Minnesota) Peter Stolt	0	1	0	0	1	0	X	X	X	X	2

Sheet 3	1	2	3	4	5	6	7	8	9	10	Final
(Minnesota) Tyler George	0	0	1	1	1	0	1	0	1	X	5
(Minnesota) Pete Fenson	0	1	0	0	0	0	0	1	0	X	2

Sheet 4	1	2	3	4	5	6	7	8	9	10	11	Final
(Washington (state)) Brady Clark	0	3	0	2	0	0	0	0	1	0	1	7
(New York (state)) Alex Leichter	2	0	1	0	1	0	0	1	0	1	0	6

Sheet 5	1	2	3	4	5	6	7	8	9	10	Final
(Minnesota) John Shuster	0	2	0	3	0	0	1	0	X	X	6
(Minnesota) Eric Fenson	2	0	3	0	0	6	0	1	X	X	12

=== Draw 7 ===
Wednesday, March 5, 8:00 am

Sheet 1	1	2	3	4	5	6	7	8	9	10	Final
(Washington (state)) Brady Clark	1	0	1	0	2	0	2	0	2	X	8
(Minnesota) Peter Stolt	0	1	0	1	0	1	0	1	0	X	4

Sheet 2	1	2	3	4	5	6	7	8	9	10	Final
(Minnesota) Tyler George	0	1	0	0	0	1	0	0	0	X	2
(Wisconsin) Craig Brown	0	0	2	0	1	0	3	0	0	X	6

Sheet 3	1	2	3	4	5	6	7	8	9	10	Final
(New York (state)) Heath McCormick	2	0	2	3	1	0	X	X	X	X	8
(Minnesota) Eric Fenson	0	1	0	0	0	1	X	X	X	X	2

Sheet 4	1	2	3	4	5	6	7	8	9	10	Final
(Minnesota) John Shuster	0	1	0	3	0	0	2	0	1	X	7
(Minnesota) Paul Pustovar	1	0	1	0	1	0	0	1	0	X	4

Sheet 5	1	2	3	4	5	6	7	8	9	10	Final
(Minnesota) Pete Fenson	0	0	3	0	2	0	2	1	0	X	8
(New York (state)) Alex Leichter	0	0	0	1	0	2	0	0	2	X	5

=== Draw 8 ===
Wednesday, March 5, 4:00 pm

Sheet 1	1	2	3	4	5	6	7	8	9	10	Final
(New York (state)) Alex Leichter	0	2	0	2	0	0	0	0	1	X	5
(New York (state)) Heath McCormick	1	0	3	0	2	0	1	1	0	X	8

Sheet 2	1	2	3	4	5	6	7	8	9	10	Final
(Minnesota) Pete Fenson	0	3	1	3	0	0	X	X	X	X	7
(Minnesota) Paul Pustovar	1	0	0	0	0	1	X	X	X	X	2

Sheet 3	1	2	3	4	5	6	7	8	9	10	Final
(Minnesota) Peter Stolt	0	0	1	0	0	1	0	0	X	X	2
(Minnesota) John Shuster	0	2	0	0	2	0	2	1	X	X	7

Sheet 4	1	2	3	4	5	6	7	8	9	10	Final
(Minnesota) Eric Fenson	2	0	2	0	0	0	0	0	1	X	5
(Wisconsin) Craig Brown	0	1	0	2	1	0	1	1	0	X	6

Sheet 5	1	2	3	4	5	6	7	8	9	10	Final
(Minnesota) Tyler George	0	1	2	0	0	0	1	0	2	0	6
(Washington (state)) Brady Clark	0	0	0	1	1	1	0	4	0	1	8

=== Draw 9 ===
Thursday, March 6, 8:00 am

Sheet 1	1	2	3	4	5	6	7	8	9	10	Final
(Minnesota) Paul Pustovar	2	3	1	0	0	1	1	1	X	X	9
(Minnesota) Eric Fenson	0	0	0	1	3	0	0	0	X	X	4

Sheet 2	1	2	3	4	5	6	7	8	9	10	Final
(Washington (state)) Brady Clark	0	2	0	0	1	0	0	0	0	X	3
(New York (state)) Heath McCormick	2	0	2	0	0	0	0	0	2	X	6

Sheet 3	1	2	3	4	5	6	7	8	9	10	Final
(New York (state)) Alex Leichter	0	0	0	2	0	1	0	0	2	2	7
(Minnesota) Tyler George	0	2	0	0	1	0	0	3	0	0	6

Sheet 4	1	2	3	4	5	6	7	8	9	10	Final
(Minnesota) Peter Stolt	0	1	1	0	0	0	2	0	0	X	4
(Minnesota) Pete Fenson	0	0	0	2	1	0	0	2	1	X	6

Sheet 5	1	2	3	4	5	6	7	8	9	10	Final
(Wisconsin) Craig Brown	0	0	1	1	0	2	0	2	1	0	7
(Minnesota) John Shuster	0	2	0	0	1	0	1	0	0	1	5

== Playoffs ==
Page playoff system
1	(Wisconsin) Craig Brown	7
2	(New York (state)) Heath McCormick	6
3	(Minnesota) Pete Fenson	7
4	(Washington (state)) Brady Clark	4

Semifinal
2	(New York (state)) Heath McCormick	4
3	(Minnesota) Pete Fenson	5

Final
1	(Wisconsin) Craig Brown	3
3	(Minnesota) Pete Fenson	9

=== 1 vs. 2 ===
Friday, March 7, 12:00 pm

Team	1	2	3	4	5	6	7	8	9	10	Final
(Wisconsin) Craig Brown	1	0	1	0	2	0	0	1	0	2	7
(New York (state)) Heath McCormick	0	1	0	2	0	1	1	0	1	0	6

Player percentages
(Wisconsin) Craig Brown		(New York (state)) Heath McCormick	
Jon Brunt	86%	Colin Hufman	94%
Matt Hamilton	72%	Rich Ruohonen	79%
Kroy Nernberger	82%	Chris Plys	91%
Craig Brown	81%	Heath McCormick	73%
Total	80%	Total	84%

=== 3 vs. 4 ===
Friday, March 7, 12:00 pm

Team	1	2	3	4	5	6	7	8	9	10	Final
(Minnesota) Pete Fenson	2	0	0	1	1	0	1	0	2	X	7
(Washington (state)) Brady Clark	0	0	1	0	0	2	0	1	0	X	4

Player percentages
(Minnesota) Pete Fenson		(Washington (state)) Brady Clark	
Ryan Brunt	77%	Philip Tilker	85%
Joe Polo	88%	Greg Persinger	86%
Shawn Rojeski	79%	Sean Beighton	82%
Pete Fenson	84%	Brady Clark	80%
Total	82%	Total	84%

=== Semifinal ===
Friday, March 7, 8:00 pm

Team	1	2	3	4	5	6	7	8	9	10	Final
(New York (state)) Heath McCormick	1	0	1	0	1	0	0	1	0	0	4
(Minnesota) Pete Fenson	0	0	0	1	0	1	1	0	1	1	5

Player percentages
(New York (state)) Heath McCormick		(Minnesota) Pete Fenson	
Colin Hufman	91%	Ryan Brunt	82%
Rich Ruohonen	88%	Joe Polo	83%
Christopher Plys	88%	Shawn Rojeski	83%
Heath McCormick	82%	Pete Fenson	78%
Total	87%	Total	82%

=== Final ===
Saturday, March 8, 3:00 pm

Team	1	2	3	4	5	6	7	8	9	10	Final
(Wisconsin) Craig Brown	0	1	0	1	0	0	1	X	X	X	3
(Minnesota) Pete Fenson	2	0	3	0	2	2	0	X	X	X	9

Player percentages
(Wisconsin) Craig Brown		(Minnesota) Pete Fenson	
Jon Brunt	100%	Ryan Brunt	91%
Matt Hamilton	89%	Joe Polo	97%
Kroy Nernberger	56%	Shawn Rojeski	100%
Craig Brown	47%	Pete Fenson	93%
Total	73%	Total	96%
