= Ryan Brunt (curler) =

American curler

- Curler
- Born: November 18, 1985 (age 40); Portage, Wisconsin, U.S.

Team
- Curling club: St. Paul CC, St. Paul, Minnesota
- Skip: Chris Plys
- Third: Colin Hufman
- Second: Joe Polo
- Lead: Ryan Brunt

Curling career
- World Championship: 2 (2011, 2014)
Medal record
Curling
Representing United States
United States Men's Curling Championship
Gold medal – first place	2011 Fargo	Team
Gold medal – first place	2014 Philadelphia	Team
Silver medal – second place	2012 Philadelphia	Team
United States Olympic Curling Trials
Silver medal – second place	2013 Fargo	Team

Ryan Brunt (born November 18, 1985, in Portage, Wisconsin) is an American curler. He is currently the lead for the Pete Fenson rink. He lives in Bloomington, Minnesota, and curls out of the St. Paul Curling Club. He curls with a left-hand delivery.

== Career ==
Brunt began curling in 1992. He participated in various bonspiels in high school and won the Wisconsin State High School Champions in 2001. He played in the United States Men's Junior Curling Championship five times, and his best finish was bronze in 2007.

Brunt began to curl with Pete Fenson and teammates Shawn Rojeski and Joe Polo during the 2010-11 curling season. His first appearance with the Fenson rink was at the 2011 Continental Cup of Curling, where he and Team North America won the cup over Team World. He participated with the Fenson rink in the 2011 United States Men's Curling Championship, where they won the right to represent the United States at the world championship in Regina, Saskatchewan. He and his team started off well but lost many close games and finished in 10th place with a 3–8 win–loss record.

== Personal life ==
Brunt graduated from the University of Wisconsin–Eau Claire with a double major in math and economics. He is currently a substitute teacher, and enjoys playing golf. His sister, Maureen Clark, is a world junior champion who competed on the United States's women's curling team at the 2006 Torino Olympics.

== Teams ==
Season	Skip	Third	Second	Lead	Alternate	Events
2006–07	Zach Jacobson	Jeff Thune	Ryan Brunt	Zane Jacobson		
2010–11	Pete Fenson	Shawn Rojeski	Joe Polo	Ryan Brunt		2011 Cont., USNCC, WCC
2011–12	Pete Fenson	Shawn Rojeski	Joe Polo	Ryan Brunt		2012 Cont., USNCC
2012–13	Pete Fenson	Shawn Rojeski	Joe Polo	Ryan Brunt		2013 USNCC
2013–14	Pete Fenson	Shawn Rojeski	Joe Polo	Ryan Brunt		
2014–15	Heath McCormick	Chris Plys	Joe Polo	Colin Hufman	Ryan Brunt	2015 USNCC
2015–16	Chris Plys	Colin Hufman	Joe Polo	Ryan Brunt		
