= 2006 Continental Cup of Curling =

- Host city: Chilliwack, British Columbia
- Arena: Prospera Centre
- Dates: November 23–26
- Winner: Team Europe
Score Breakdown
Discipline	NA	Europe
Mixed Doubles Round 1	12	6
Women's Team Round 1	15	3
Men's Team Round 1	12	6
Women's Team Round 2	0	18
Singles	18	14
Men's Team Round 2	9	9
Men's Skins A	10	20
Women's Skins A	0	30
Mixed Doubles Round 2	12	6
Men's Skins B	10	30
Women's Skins B	6	34
Women's Skins C	28	32
Men's Skins C	43	17
Total	171	229

The 2006 Continental Cup of Curling was a curling tournament held from November 23 to 26 in Chilliwack, British Columbia between six North American teams and six European teams. Europe defeated North America 229-171 after a series of North American losses in the skins games.

== Teams ==
The teams representing this year's edition is as follows:

Team	Country	Home	Skip	Third	Second	Lead
North America	United States	Bemidji CC, Bemidji	Pete Fenson	Shawn Rojeski	Joe Polo	Doug Pottinger
North America	Canada	St. John's CC, St. John's	Brad Gushue	Mark Nichols	Russ Howard	Jamie Korab
North America	Canada	Calgary Winter Club, Calgary	Shannon Kleibrink	Amy Nixon	Bronwen Saunders	Christine Keshen
North America	United States	Madison CC, Madison	Debbie McCormick	Nicole Joraanstad	Natalie Nicholson	Tracy Sachtjen
North America	Canada	CC Victoria, Sainte-Foy and CC Etchemin, Saint-Romuald	Jean-Michel Menard	François Roberge	Eric Sylvain	Maxime Elmaleh
Europe	Scotland	Lockerbie CC, Lockerbie	David Murdoch	Ewan MacDonald	Peter Smith	Euan Byers
Europe	Sweden	Härnösands CK, Härnösand	Anette Norberg	Eva Lund	Cathrine Lindahl	Anna Svard
Europe	Switzerland	Flims CC, Flims	Mirjam Ott	Binia Feltscher-Beeli	Valeria Spalty	Janine Greiner
Europe	Germany	SC Riessersee, Garmisch-Partenkirchen	Andrea Schopp	Monika Wagner	Anna Hartelt	Tina Tichatschke
North America	Canada	Kelowna CC, Kelowna	Kelly Scott	Jeanna Schraeder	Sasha Carter	Renee Simons
Europe	Norway	Stabekk CC, Oslo	Pål Trulsen	Lars Vågberg	Flemming Davanger	Bent Anund Ramsfjell
Europe	Finland	Oulunkylä Curling, Helsinki	Markku Uusipaavalniemi	Kalle Kiiskinen	Jani Sullanmaa	Teemu Salo

This tournament marks the first time a Finnish team has competed in the Continental Cup, as well as the first in which neither the rink of Randy Ferbey or Colleen Jones appeared (as Ferbey was defeated in the provincial playdowns did not qualify for the Brier and Jones did not win the Tournament of Hearts). It is also the first time the winners of the Canada Cup of Curling is not awarded a berth in the Continental Cup (their positions being replaced by the teams representing Canada at the 2006 Olympic Winter Games instead). The European team is captained by Elisabet Gustafson, who had competed in the inaugural Continental Cup. The North American team is captained by Lindsay Sparkes and Linda Moore.

== Mixed doubles ==
Teams are awarded six points for each victory in this match. If the match is tied after six ends, the two teams will each earn three points.

The team format of mixed doubles in this Continental Cup and previous cups is different than from the team format used starting with the 2007 Continental Cup. In this team format, four players play on a team, and each player has one role only, throwing or sweeping. There are two throwers and two sweepers. The format of play is the same as it is in any cup. The players in each game are listed as such: (Thrower/Thrower, Sweeper/Sweeper).

Thursday, November 23, 12:30pm ET

Sheet A	1	2	3	4	5	6	7	8	Final	Points
Europe (Feltscher-Beeli/Murdoch, Grenier/Byers)	0	2	0	0	1	0	2	0	5	0
North America (Schraeder/Ménard, Simons/Elmaleh)	2	0	3	1	0	4	0	2	12	6

Sheet B	1	2	3	4	5	6	7	8	Final	Points
Europe (Norberg/Vågberg, Svard/Ramsfjell)	1	1	0	3	0	1	0	0	6	0
North America (Joraanstad/Fenson, Sachtjen/Polo)	0	0	3	0	1	0	2	1	7	6

Sheet C	1	2	3	4	5	6	7	8	Final	Points
Europe (Lund/Trulsen, Lindahl/Davanger)	1	0	1	1	0	1	0	2	6	6
North America (Nixon/Gushue, Saunders/Nichols)	0	2	0	0	1	0	2	0	5	0

Saturday, November 25, 6:00pm ET

Sheet A	1	2	3	4	5	6	7	8	Final	Points
Europe (Ott/MacDonald, Spalty/Smith)	0	1	0	0	1	1	0	3	6	6
North America (Scott/Roberge, Carter/Sylvain)	1	0	1	2	0	0	1	0	5	0

Sheet B	1	2	3	4	5	6	7	8	Final	Points
Europe (Wagner/Kiiskinen, Tichatschke/Salo)	3	1	0	0	1	1	0	3	9	0
North America (McCormick/Rojeski, Nicholson/Pottinger)	0	0	4	1	0	0	6	0	11	6

Sheet C	1	2	3	4	5	6	7	8	Final	Points
Europe (Schöpp/Uusipaavalniemi, Hartlet/Sullanmaa)	1	0	0	1	0	1	0	0	3	0
North America (Kleibrink/Howard, Keshen/Korab)	0	1	1	0	2	0	1	1	6	6

== Singles ==
Teams earn four points for each victory in this match. If the match is tied through all events, the two teams will each earn two points. An additional eight points will be awarded to the team with the higher aggregate score in this portion of the event.

The player listed played all of the shots; his/her teammates were sweepers or held the broom.

Friday, November 24, 5:00pm ET

Sheet A	Runthrough	Button	Port	Raise	Hit-and-Roll	Double	Total	Points
Europe (Uusipaavalniemi)	2	5	4	5	3	3	22	4
North America (Gushue)	5	5	5	4	1	0	20	0

Sheet B	Runthrough	Button	Port	Raise	Hit-and-Roll	Double	Total	Points
Europe (Davanger)	1	4	5	3	4	5	22	4
North America (Rojeski)	0	5	3	4	3	5	20	0

Sheet C	Runthrough	Button	Port	Raise	Hit-and-Roll	Double	Total	Points
Europe (MacDonald)	0	5	4	2	4	5	20	4
North America (Elmaleh)	2	4	4	2	0	5	17	0

Sheet A	Runthrough	Button	Port	Raise	Hit-and-Roll	Double	Total	Points
Europe (Schöpp)	0	0	4	0	1	0	5	0
North America (Scott)	5	1	4	3	4	5	22	4

Sheet B	Runthrough	Button	Port	Raise	Hit-and-Roll	Double	Total	Points
Europe (Ott)	5	2	2	0	0	5	14	4
North America (McCormick)	0	2	3	3	1	0	9	0

Sheet C	Runthrough	Button	Port	Raise	Hit-and-Roll	Double	Total	Points
Europe (Svärd)	0	4	5	2	5	5	21	2
North America (Kleibrink)	3	5	5	2	1	5	21	2

North America wins the bonus points for having the higher aggregate total, 109-104.

== Teams ==
Teams are awarded six points for each victory in the team match. If the match is tied after 8 ends, the two teams will each earn three points.

=== Women ===
Thursday, November 23, 5:00pm ET

Sheet A	1	2	3	4	5	6	7	8	Final	Points
Europe (Norberg)	0	0	1	1	0	1	0	0	3	0
North America (McCormick)	1	1	0	0	1	0	2	1	6	6

Sheet B	1	2	3	4	5	6	7	8	Final	Points
Europe (Schöpp)	1	1	0	1	0	1	0	0	4	3
North America (Scott)	0	0	1	0	1	0	1	1	4	3

Sheet C	1	2	3	4	5	6	7	8	Final	Points
Europe (Ott)	0	0	1	0	0	2	0	2	5	0
North America (Kleibrink)	3	1	0	0	1	0	3	0	8	6

Friday, November 24, 12:30pm ET

Sheet A	1	2	3	4	5	6	7	8	Final	Points
Europe (Schöpp)	0	2	0	2	0	0	1	1	6	6
North America (Kleibrink)	0	0	2	0	2	1	0	0	5	0

Sheet B	1	2	3	4	5	6	7	8	Final	Points
Europe (Ott)	2	0	1	0	1	0	0	1	5	6
North America (McCormick)	0	2	0	1	0	0	1	0	4	0

Sheet C	1	2	3	4	5	6	7	8	Final	Points
Europe (Norberg)	3	0	0	0	3	0	1	2	9	6
North America (Scott)	0	1	1	1	0	2	0	0	5	0

=== Men ===
Thursday, November 23, 9:30pm ET

Sheet A	1	2	3	4	5	6	7	8	Final	Points
Europe (Murdoch)	0	1	0	1	0	0	3	0	5	0
North America (Ménard)	0	0	1	0	0	3	0	2	6	6

Sheet B	1	2	3	4	5	6	7	8	Final	Points
Europe (Trulsen)	1	0	0	1	0	0	1	1	4	0
North America (Gushue)	0	1	1	0	0	3	0	0	5	6

Sheet C	1	2	3	4	5	6	7	8	Final	Points
Europe (Uusipaavalniemi)	0	1	2	2	0	1	0	1	7	6
North America (Fenson)	3	0	0	0	2	0	0	0	5	0

Friday, November 24, 9:30pm ET

Sheet A	1	2	3	4	5	6	7	8	Final	Points
Europe (Trulsen)	1	0	2	0	1	0	0	0	4	0
North America (Ménard)	0	1	0	1	0	1	1	1	5	6

Sheet B	1	2	3	4	5	6	7	8	Final	Points
Europe (Uusipaavalniemi)	0	0	2	1	0	0	0	0	3	3
North America (Fenson)	1	0	0	0	0	0	1	1	3	3

Sheet C	1	2	3	4	5	6	7	8	Final	Points
Europe (Murdoch)	2	0	0	2	1	0	0	0	5	6
North America (Gushue)	0	2	1	0	0	0	1	0	4	0

== Skins ==
In the skins portion of the event, teams get points that contribute to the overall score by scoring at least 2 points with the hammer or forcing a steal without. The number of points is unevenly divided through each of the 8 ends in each of the 3 ends.

=== "A" Competition ===
Saturday, November 25, 1:30pm ET

Sheet A	1	2	3	4	5	6	7	8	Points
Europe (Uusipaavalniemi)		X		X		0	X		20
North America (Fenson)	0		0		X			X	10

Sheet C	1	2	3	4	5	6	7	8	Points
Europe (Schöpp)	0	X		0		0		X	30
North America (McCormick)			0		0		0		0

=== "B" Competition ===
Saturday, November 25, 9:30pm ET

Sheet A	1	2	3	4	5	6	7	8	Points
Europe (Trulsen)	0		0		X		X		30
North America (Ménard)		0		0		0		X	10

Sheet C	1	2	3	4	5	6	7	8	Points
Europe (Ott)		X		X	X		X	X	34
North America (Scott)	0		0			X			6

=== "C" Competition ===
Sunday, November 26, 12:30pm ET

Sheet B	1	2	3	4	5	6	7	8	Points
Europe (Norberg)	X	X					X	X	32
North America (Kleibrink)			0	X	X	X			28

Sunday, November 26, 1:30pm ET

Sheet B	1	2	3	4	5	6	7	8	Points
Europe (Murdoch)		X		0		X			17
North America (Gushue)	0		0		X		0	X	43
