= Colin Hufman =

American curler (born 1984)

- Curler
- Born: May 15, 1984 (age 42); Fairbanks, Alaska, U.S.
- Height: 6 ft 3 in (191 cm)

Team
- Curling club: Seattle CC, Seattle, WA

Curling career
- Member Association: United States
- World Championship: 5 (2018, 2021, 2023, 2024, 2026)
- Pan Continental Championship: 2 (2024, 2025)
- Olympic: 1 (2022)
Medal record
Curling
Representing United States
Pan Continental Championships
Silver medal – second place	2025 Virginia
Bronze medal – third place	2024 Lacombe
Representing Minnesota
US Olympic Trials
Silver medal – second place	2025 Sioux Falls
United States Men's Curling Championship
Gold medal – first place	2016 Jacksonville
Gold medal – first place	2018 Fargo
Gold medal – first place	2024 East Rutherford
Gold medal – first place	2026 Charlotte
Silver medal – second place	2013 Green Bay
Silver medal – second place	2019 Kalamazoo
Silver medal – second place	2020 Cheney
Bronze medal – third place	2005 Madison
Bronze medal – third place	2006 Bemidji
Bronze medal – third place	2007 Utica
Bronze medal – third place	2008 Hibbing
Bronze medal – third place	2014 Philadelphia
Bronze medal – third place	2015 Kalamazoo
Bronze medal – third place	2017 Everett
Bronze medal – third place	2025 Duluth
Curling Night in America
Gold medal – first place	2014 Blaine
Gold medal – first place	2021 Irvine

Colin Hufman (born May 15, 1984) is an American curler. He was born in Fairbanks, Alaska, and resides in Seattle. He has been a USA Curling Board member since August 2017 and USA Curling Athlete Representative for the United States Olympic & Paralympic Committee Athletes Advisory Council since December 2020.

== Career ==
In 2002, Hufman won the United States Junior Championship, playing third for Leo Johnson's team. Representing the United States at the 2002 World Junior Championships in Kelowna, Canada, they finished in ninth place with a 3–6 record.

Hufman has won numerous medals at the United States Men's Championship, including gold twice. In 2016 he won playing second for skip Brady Clark, but runner-up John Shuster earned enough points to earn the chance to represent the US at the World Championship that year. In 2018, Hufman won his second gold medal, this time playing second for Rich Ruohonen. At the 2018 World Men's Curling Championship, Team Ruohonen finished in sixth place with a 6–7 record.

At the 2020 United States Men's Championship, Hufman and Team Ruohonen earned a silver medal, losing to John Shuster in the final.

In 2021, Hufman played as the alternate for Team John Shuster at the 2021 World Men's Curling Championship in Calgary, Alberta. Due to the COVID-19 pandemic, the 2021 United States Men's Curling Championship was postponed until after the World Men's Championship and the United States Curling Association decided Team Shuster, the 2020 National Champions, would represent the U.S. at the Worlds. At the championship, the team led the U.S. to a 10–3 round robin record, in third place. They played Switzerland in the playoffs, in a game which was delayed a day due to some curlers testing positive for the virus. In the game, Switzerland, skipped by Peter de Cruz, beat the Americans to advance to the semifinals.

== Personal life ==
Hufman works as program manager and as of 2021 was married to Erin Momany.

== Teams ==
Season	Skip	Third	Second	Lead	Alternate	Coach	Events
1998–99	Leo Johnson	Colin Hufman	Martin Sather	Chris Benshoof	Steven Birklid	Bill Gryder	1999 USJCC (5th)
1999–00	Leo Johnson	Colin Hufman	Martin Sather	Chris Benshoof	Steven Birklid	Bill Gryder	2000 USJCC (9th)
2000–01	Leo Johnson	Colin Hufman	Martin Sather	Chris Benshoof	Tom Hewitt	Bill Gryder	2001 USJCC (SF)
2001–02	Leo Johnson	Colin Hufman	Martin Sather	Chris Benshoof	Steven Birklid (WJCC)	Dennis Theis	2002 USJCC (gold); 2002 WJCC (9th)
2002–03	Colin Hufman	Steven Birklid	Martin Sather	Chris Benshoof			2003 USMCC (13th)
2003–04	Wes Johnson	Leon Romaniuk	Colin Hufman	Ryan Beighton	Tom Violette		2004 USMCC (13th)
2004–05	Steven Birklid	Tommy Kent	Chad Persinger	Scott MacDonald	Colin Hufman	Dennis Thies	2005 USJCC (SF)
2004–05	Brady Clark	Greg Persinger	Colin Hufman	Ken Trask	Doug Kauffman		2005 USMCC/USOCT (bronze)
2005–06	Jason Larway	Brady Clark	Colin Hufman	Joel Larway			2006 USMCC (bronze)
2006–07	Jason Larway	Colin Hufman	Joel Larway	Steven Demlow			2007 USMCC (bronze)
2007–08	Jason Larway	Colin Hufman	Greg Persinger	Joel Larway	Steven Demlow		2008 USMCC (bronze)
2008–09	Jason Larway	Colin Hufman	Joel Larway	Bill Todhunter	Greg Johnson		
2010–11	Jason Larway	Colin Hufman	Sean Beighton	Joel Larway			2011 USMCC (9th)
2011–12	Tyler George	Chris Plys	Rich Ruohonen	Colin Hufman			2012 USMCC (8th)
2012–13	Chris Plys (fourth)	Tyler George (skip)	Rich Ruohonen	Colin Hufman			2013 USMCC (silver)
2013–14	Chris Plys (fourth)	Tyler George (skip)	Rich Ruohonen	Colin Hufman	Craig Brown		2013 USOCT (4th)
2013–14	Heath McCormick	Chris Plys	Rich Ruohonen	Colin Hufman			2014 USMCC (bronze)
2014–15	Heath McCormick	Chris Plys	Joe Polo	Colin Hufman	Ryan Brunt		2015 USMCC (bronze)
2015–16	Brady Clark	Greg Persinger	Colin Hufman	Philip Tilker			2016 USMCC (gold)
2016–17	Brady Clark	Greg Persinger	Colin Hufman	Philip Tilker			2017 USMCC (bronze)
2017–18	Brady Clark	Greg Persinger	Colin Hufman	Philip Tilker			2017 USOCT (5th)
2017–18	Greg Persinger (fourth)	Rich Ruohonen (skip)	Colin Hufman	Philip Tilker	Chris Plys (WMCC)	Phill Drobnick	2018 USMCC (gold); 2018 WMCC (6th)
2018–19	Greg Persinger (fourth)	Rich Ruohonen (skip)	Colin Hufman	Philip Tilker			2019 USMCC (silver)
2019–20	Rich Ruohonen	Greg Persinger	Colin Hufman	Philip Tilker	Kroy Nernberger		2020 USMCC (silver)
2020–21	Rich Ruohonen	Andrew Stopera	Colin Hufman	Philip Tilker	Kroy Nernberger		
2020–21	John Shuster	Chris Plys	Matt Hamilton	John Landsteiner	Colin Hufman	Sean Beighton	2021 WMCC (5th)
2021–22	Rich Ruohonen	Andrew Stopera	Colin Hufman	Kroy Nernberger	Philip Tilker		
2021–22	John Shuster	Chris Plys	Matt Hamilton	John Landsteiner	Colin Hufman		2022 OG (4th)
2022–23	John Shuster	Chris Plys	Matt Hamilton	John Landsteiner	Colin Hufman	Phil Drobnick	2023 USMCC (gold); 2023 WMCC (8th)
2023–24	John Shuster	Chris Plys	Colin Hufman	Matt Hamilton	John Landsteiner	Theran Michaelis	2024 USMCC (gold); 2024 WMCC (6th)
2024–25	John Shuster	Chris Plys	Colin Hufman	Matt Hamilton	John Landsteiner	Theran Michaelis	2024 PCCC (bronze); 2025 USMCC (bronze)
2025–26	John Shuster	Chris Plys	Colin Hufman	Matt Hamilton	Daniel Casper (PCCC); Aidan Oldenburg (WMCC)	Theran Michaelis	2025 PCCC (silver); 2026 USMCC (gold); 2026 WMCC (4th)
