= Joe Polo =

American curler

Joseph Polo
- Curler
- Born: December 10, 1982 (age 43); Duluth, Minnesota, U.S.

Team
- Curling club: Bemidji CC, Bemidji, Minnesota
- Skip: Joe Polo
- Third: Rich Ruohonen
- Second: Matt Mellin
- Lead: Derek Benson
- Mixed doubles partner: Tabitha Peterson

Curling career
- Member Association: United States
- World Championship: 7 (2005, 2006, 2010, 2011, 2014, 2017, 2022)
- World Mixed Doubles Championship: 2 (2016, 2021)
- Olympic: 2 (2006, 2018)
Medal record
Curling
Representing United States
Winter Olympics
Gold medal – first place	2018 Pyeongchang	Team
Bronze medal – third place	2006 Turin	Team
World Mixed Doubles Championship
Bronze medal – third place	2016 Karlstad
US Men's Championship
Gold medal – first place	2005 Madison
Gold medal – first place	2006 Bemidji
Gold medal – first place	2010 Kalamazoo
Gold medal – first place	2011 Fargo
Gold medal – first place	2014 Philadelphia
Gold medal – first place	2017 Everett
Gold medal – first place	2021 Wausau
Silver medal – second place	2012 Philadelphia
Bronze medal – third place	2015 Kalamazoo
US Olympic Trials
Gold medal – first place	2005 Madison
Gold medal – first place	2017 Omaha
Silver medal – second place	2013 Fargo
US Mixed Doubles Championship
Gold medal – first place	2020 Eau Claire
Silver medal – second place	2017 Blaine
Bronze medal – third place	2016 Denver

Joseph Polo (born December 10, 1982) is an American curler who is best known for winning a bronze medal at the 2006 Winter Olympics and being the alternate on the gold-medal winning United States men's team at the 2018 Winter Olympics. Polo was raised in Floodwood, Minnesota before moving to Cass Lake. He learned to curl in nearby Bemidji at the age of 10 in the Bemidji Curling Club's Sunday Night Junior League.

== Curling career ==
=== Men's ===
When Polo transitioned from juniors to men's, he joined Pete Fenson's team at second. The team also consisted of John Shuster at lead and Shawn Rojeski at third. Team Fenson won the United States Olympic trials ahead of the 2006 Winter Olympics, which also counted as the 2005 National Championships. As a result, they represented the United States at the 2005 World Men's Curling Championship, where they just missed the playoffs when they lost a tiebreaker game to Norway's Pål Trulsen. At the Olympics they lost to Canada, skipped by Brad Gushue, in the semifinals and then defeated David Murdoch's Team Great Britain to take the bronze medal. Shortly after the Olympics completed they successfully defended their United States National Title at the 2006 National Men's Championship, which earned them another trip to the World Championship. At the 2006 World Men's Championship, held in Lowell, Massachusetts, they finished in fourth place when they lost the 3 vs 4 page playoff game to Norway's Thomas Ulsrud. On January 16, 2007, the team was named the 2006 USOC Team of the Year.

Polo continued to play second on Fenson's team for another eight seasons, winning the United States Men's Championship three more times. The only year they didn't compete at the National Championship was in 2009, when they ended up one win short of earning a spot at the play-in tournament, and missed the combination National Championship and Olympic Trials.

After participating at the 2010 Worlds and finishing in fourth place, Polo, Fenson, Rojeski, and Ryan Brunt went to the 2011 Continental Cup of Curling, where Team North America defeated Team World. The team then headed to the 2011 US Nationals, where they again won gold when they finished the tournament undefeated. They represented the United States at the 2011 Ford World Men's Curling Championship in April at Regina, Saskatchewan, finishing in 10th place with a 3–8 win–loss record after a series of close losses.

Starting in the 2016–17 season, Polo joined John Shuster's team as a full-time alternate; the rest of the team included Tyler George, Matt Hamilton, and John Landsteiner. Polo won his sixth US title with Team Shuster at the 2017 United States Men's Championship and then the team finished the 2017 World Championship in fourth place when they lost to Switzerland in the bronze medal match. At the 2017 United States Olympic Curling Trials, Team Shuster beat Heath McCormick's team in a best-of-three final series, setting up Polo's second Olympics appearance. At the 2018 Winter Olympics in PyeongChang, the US team lost four of its first six matches and needed to win all of its three remaining matches to qualify for the playoffs, but all of its remaining opponents (Canada, Switzerland, and Great Britain) were then among the top four teams. Nevertheless, the US team won all three matches to finish the round-robin in third place with a record of 5–4. In the semifinals they defeated Canada's Kevin Koe, a two-time world champion, to reach the gold-medal match versus Niklas Edin's team representing Sweden. The gold-medal game was close through seven ends, with the score tied 5–5, but the United States scored five in the eighth end to set up a 10–7 victory. This was the first Olympic gold medal in curling for the United States.

Polo joined a team of four younger curlers, Korey Dropkin, Tom Howell, Mark Fenner, and Alex Fenson, at the start of the 2018–19 season and the team rotated line-ups throughout the season.

=== Mixed doubles ===
In 2016, Polo teamed up with Tabitha Peterson to compete at the United States Mixed Doubles World Trials, a tournament to determine the US representative at the 2016 World Mixed Doubles Curling Championship in Karlstad, Sweden. They finished with an impressive 9–1 record, earning them the spot at Worlds. Peterson and Polo finished the round-robin group play undefeated, losing to Russia's Alexander Krushelnitskiy and Anastasia Bryzgalova in the semifinals. In the bronze medal match they defeated Team Scotland, Bruce Mouat and Gina Aitken, 9–7.

Polo has continued to compete in mixed doubles with Peterson since that first success. At the 2017 US Mixed Doubles Championship Polo and Peterson earned the silver medal losing to the brother and sister duo of Matt and Becca Hamilton in the final. Later in 2017 Polo and Peterson competed at the first United States Mixed Doubles Olympic Trials, where they finished tied for fifth with a record of 3–4.

At the 2019 United States Mixed Doubles Championship, Polo and Peterson went undefeated through the round-robin section of the tournament but ultimately lost in the semifinal to eventual champions Cory Christensen and John Shuster. The next year, Polo and Peterson again faced Christensen and Shuster, but this time in the final and Peterson and Polo won 7–4. This was their first mixed doubles national title, and earned them a spot at the 2020 World Mixed Doubles Curling Championship and the 2021 United States Mixed Doubles Olympic Trials. But about a month before the World Championship was supposed to begin the World Curling Federation announced its cancellation due to the ongoing COVID-19 pandemic. The next year the United States Curling Association announced that the 2021 US Mixed Doubles Championship would be postponed until after the 2021 World Mixed Doubles due to the pandemic, and so as 2020 national champions Polo and Peterson were invited to represent the United States at the 2021 Worlds.

== Personal life ==
Polo attended Bemidji State University and University of North Dakota, earning an engineering degree. He is employed as a project manager.

Polo has a wife, Kristin, and a daughter, Ailsa. His daughter is named after Ailsa Craig, an island off of Scotland and one of only two places that granite is quarried to make curling stones.

== Teams ==
=== Men's ===
Season	Skip	Third	Second	Lead	Alternate	Coach	Events
2002–03	Kristopher Perkovich	Jason Smith	Jeff Isaacson	Tom Scott	Joe Polo	John Lesnak	2003 WJBCC (bronze)
2003–04	Jason Smith	Joe Polo	Jeff Isaacson	Tom Scott		John Lesnak	2003 USJCC (5th)
2003–04	Zach Jacobson	Joe Polo	Jeff Thune	Zane Jacobson		Joel Jacobson	2004 USJCC (silver)
2004–05	Pete Fenson	Shawn Rojeski	Joe Polo	John Shuster	Scott Baird (WMCC)	Bob Fenson (WMCC)	2005 USMCC/USOCT (gold); 2005 WMCC (6th)
2005–06	Pete Fenson	Shawn Rojeski	Joe Polo	Doug Pottinger			2006 Cont. Cup
2005–06	Pete Fenson	Shawn Rojeski	Joe Polo	John Shuster			2006 USMCC (gold); 2006 OG (bronze); 2006 WMCC (4th)
2006–07	Pete Fenson	Shawn Rojeski	Joe Polo	Doug Pottinger			2007 USMCC (5th)
2007–08	Pete Fenson	Shawn Rojeski	Joe Polo	John Shuster			2008 USMCC (6th)
2009–10	Pete Fenson	Shawn Rojeski	Joe Polo	Tyler George			2010 USMCC (gold); 2010 WMCC (4th)
2010–11	Pete Fenson	Shawn Rojeski	Joe Polo	Ryan Brunt			2011 Cont. Cup, 2011 USMCC (gold); 2011WMCC (10th)
2011–12	Pete Fenson	Shawn Rojeski	Joe Polo	Ryan Brunt			2012 Cont. Cup, 2012 USMCC (silver)
2012–13	Pete Fenson	Shawn Rojeski	Joe Polo	Ryan Brunt			2013 USMCC (7th)
2013–14	Pete Fenson	Shawn Rojeski	Joe Polo	Ryan Brunt	Jared Zezel (WMCC)	Al Hackner (WMCC)	2014 USMCC (gold); 2014 WMCC (10th)
2014–15	Heath McCormick	Chris Plys	Joe Polo	Colin Hufman	Ryan Brunt		2015 USMCC (bronze)
2015–16	Chris Plys (fourth)	Pete Fenson (skip)	Joe Polo	Jason Smith			2016 USMCC (5th)
2016–17	John Shuster	Tyler George	Matt Hamilton	John Landsteiner	Joe Polo		2017 USMCC (gold); 2017 WMCC (4th)
2017–18	John Shuster	Tyler George	Matt Hamilton	John Landsteiner	Joe Polo		2017 USOCT (gold); 2018 OG (gold)
2018–19	Joe Polo	Jeff Currie	Jared Zezel	Derek Benson			
2019–20	Korey Dropkin	Tom Howell	Mark Fenner	Alex Fenson	Joe Polo		2020 USMCC (5th)
2020–21	Korey Dropkin	Joe Polo	Mark Fenner	Thomas Howell	Alex Fenson		2021 USMCC (gold)
2021–22	Korey Dropkin	Joe Polo	Mark Fenner	Thomas Howell	Alex Fenson		

=== Mixed doubles ===
Season	Male	Female	Events
2015–16	Joe Polo	Tabitha Peterson	2016 WMDCC (bronze)
2016–17	Joe Polo	Tabitha Peterson	2017 USMDCC (silver)
2017–18	Joe Polo	Tabitha Peterson	2017 USMDCOT (5th)
2018–19	Joe Polo	Tabitha Peterson	2019 USMDCC (SF)
2019–20	Joe Polo	Tabitha Peterson	2020 USMDCC (gold)
2020–21	Joe Polo	Tabitha Peterson	2021 WMDCC (8th)
2021–22	Joe Polo	Tabitha Peterson	
