= Heath McCormick =

Canadian-American curler

- Curler
- Born: August 7, 1976 (age 50); Lansing, Michigan, U.S.

Curling career
- Member Association: Ontario (1992–2010; 2019–present) (United States) Grand National (2010–2014; 2015–2016); Minnesota (2014–2015; 2016–2019)
- World Championship: 1 (2012)
Medal record
Men's curling
Representing the United States
United States Men's Curling Championship
Gold medal – first place	2012 Philadelphia
Bronze medal – third place	2014 Philadelphia
Bronze medal – third place	2015 Kalamazoo
United States Olympic Curling Trials
Silver medal – second place	2017 Omaha
Bronze medal – third place	2013 Fargo

Heath McCormick (born August 7, 1976) is a Canadian-American curler from Sarnia, Ontario.

== Career ==
McCormick began curling in 1992 as a junior in Ontario. He competed in the Ontario Junior Curling Championships five times, and won in 1996 playing third for Patrick Ferris. That rink represented Ontario at the 1996 Canadian Junior Curling Championships where they lost in a tie-breaker game to Nova Scotia's Rob Sifton. He also competed in the Ontario's men's provincial championships six times and finished as runner-up in 2003. He was part of the winning team in the 2004 Ontario mixed championship. He lost in the final of the 2004 Canadian Mixed Curling Championship to Shannon Kleibrink of Alberta.

In 2010, McCormick returned to the United States after he was recruited by Bill Stopera, Martin Sather, and Dean Gemmell to replace Matt Hames, who was retiring, as skip. With his new team, McCormick competed in the 2011 United States Men's Curling Championship, finishing fourth after a playoff loss to Todd Birr. He returned the next year to play in the nationals and went through the round robin undefeated, eventually securing his first nationals title with a win over defending champion Pete Fenson.

McCormick and his team played at the 2013 United States Men's Curling Championship, and qualified for the playoffs, defeating Fenson and Mike Farbelow in the tiebreaker round. They lost to eventual champion Brady Clark in the 3 vs. 4 page playoff game.

Upon their semifinal win at the 2012 United States Men's Curling Championship, McCormick and his team were qualified to participate at the 2014 United States Olympic Curling Trials.

=== Grand Slam record ===
Key
C	Champion
F	Lost in Final
SF	Lost in Semifinal
QF	Lost in Quarterfinals
R16	Lost in the round of 16
Q	Did not advance to playoffs
T2	Played in Tier 2 event
DNP	Did not participate in event
N/A	Not a Grand Slam event that season

Event	2003–04	2004–05	2005–06	2006–07	2007–08	2008–09	2009–10	2010–11	2011–12	2012–13	2013–14	2014–15	2015–16	2016–17	2017–18
Tour Challenge	—N/a												DNP	DNP	Q
Masters / World Cup	DNP	DNP	DNP	DNP	DNP	DNP	DNP	DNP	DNP	Q	DNP	DNP	DNP	DNP	DNP
The National	Q	Q	DNP	DNP	DNP	DNP	DNP	DNP	DNP	DNP	DNP	SF	DNP	DNP	DNP
Canadian Open	Q	DNP	DNP	DNP	DNP	DNP	DNP	DNP	DNP	DNP	DNP	DNP	DNP	Q	DNP
Players'	DNP	DNP	DNP	DNP	DNP	DNP	DNP	DNP	DNP	DNP	DNP	DNP	DNP	DNP	DNP

== Personal life ==
McCormick grew up in Sarnia, Ontario. He studied at the University of Western Ontario. He works as an insurance broker with McCormick Insurance Brokers Ltd. Despite sharing a last name, Heath is not related to United States female curler Debbie McCormick.

== Teams ==
Season	Skip	Third	Second	Lead	Alternate	Events
2010–11	Heath McCormick	Bill Stopera	Martin Sather	Dean Gemmell		2011 USNCC
2011–12	Heath McCormick	Bill Stopera	Martin Sather	Dean Gemmell		2012 USNCC, 2012 WCC
2012–13	Heath McCormick	Bill Stopera	Martin Sather	Dean Gemmell		2013 USNCC
2013–14	Heath McCormick	Bill Stopera	Dean Gemmell	Martin Sather		2013 USOCT
2014–15	Heath McCormick	Chris Plys	Joe Polo	Colin Hufman	Ryan Brunt	2015 USNCC
2015–16	Heath McCormick	Bill Stopera	Dean Gemmell	Mark Lazar	Andrew Stopera	2016 USNCC
2016–17	Heath McCormick	Chris Plys	Korey Dropkin	Tom Howell		2017 USNCC
2017–18	Heath McCormick	Chris Plys	Korey Dropkin	Tom Howell	Rich Ruohonen	2017 USOCT
