= 2009 United States Olympic curling trials =

2009 United States Olympic Curling Trials/ 2009 United States National Curling Championships
- Host city: Broomfield, Colorado
- Arena: Broomfield Event Center
- Dates: February 21–28
- Men's winner: (Minnesota) John Shuster
- Skip: John Shuster
- Third: Jason Smith
- Second: Jeff Isaacson
- Lead: John Benton
- Finalist: (Minnesota) Tyler George
- Women's winner: (Wisconsin) Debbie McCormick
- Skip: Debbie McCormick
- Third: Allison Pottinger
- Second: Nicole Joraanstad
- Lead: Natalie Nicholson
- Finalist: (New York (state)) Patti Lank

The 2009 United States Olympic Curling Team Trials were held from February 21 to 28, 2009 at the Broomfield Event Center in Broomfield, Colorado. Trials have been held ever since curling returned to the Olympics as a demonstration sport in 1988. The trials also constituted the 2009 United States National Curling Championships.

The winning men's and women's teams represented the United States at the 2010 Winter Olympics and the 2009 men's and women's World Championship.

== Men ==
=== Teams ===
The teams are listed as follows:

Skip	Third	Second	Lead	Alternate	Locale
Christopher Plys	Aanders Brorson	Matt Perushek	Matt Hamilton	Phill Drobnick	Duluth, Minnesota
Tyler George	Kris Perkovich	Kevin Johnson	Mark Haluptzok		Duluth, Minnesota
Kevin Deeren	Kraig Deeren	Joey Bonfoey	Richard Maskel		Chicago, Illinois
Mike Farbelow	Nick Myers	Tim Solin	Tim Gartner		Minneapolis, Minnesota
Todd Birr	Paul Pustovar	Greg Wilson	Kevin Birr		Mankato, Minnesota
Mark Johnson	Wes Johnson	Brady Clark	Ken Trask	Derrick McLean	(Washington (state)) Seattle, Washington
John Shuster	Jason Smith	Jeff Isaacson	John Benton	Ryan Lemke	Duluth, Minnesota
Craig Disher	Kevin Kakela	Zach Jacobson	Carey Kakela	Kurt Disher	Rolla, North Dakota
Craig Brown	Rich Ruohonen	John Dunlop	Pete Annis		Madison, Wisconsin
Greg Romaniuk	Doug Pottinger	Leon Romaniuk	Troy Schroeder		(Washington (state)) Snohomish, Washington

=== Round robin standings ===
Key
Teams to playoffs
Teams to tiebreaker for seeding

Skip	W	L
(Minnesota) Tyler George	8	1
(Minnesota) Todd Birr	6	3
(Minnesota) John Shuster	6	3
(Wisconsin) Craig Brown	5	4
(Washington (state)) Greg Romaniuk	4	5
(Washington (state)) Mark Johnson	4	5
(Minnesota) Mike Farbelow	4	5
(North Dakota) Craig Disher	3	6
(Minnesota) Chris Plys	3	6
(Illinois) Kevin Deeren	2	7

=== Round robin results ===
==== Draw 1 ====
Saturday, February 21, 20:00

Sheet 1	1	2	3	4	5	6	7	8	9	10	Final
(Minnesota) Mike Farbelow	1	0	0	1	1	0	1	0	0	X	4
(North Dakota) Craig Disher	0	2	3	0	0	1	0	1	1	X	8

Sheet 2	1	2	3	4	5	6	7	8	9	10	Final
(Minnesota) Tyler George	2	0	0	0	1	0	1	1	1	0	6
(Minnesota) Todd Birr	0	2	0	1	0	3	0	0	0	2	8

Sheet 3	1	2	3	4	5	6	7	8	9	10	Final
(Washington (state)) Greg Romaniuk	2	0	0	1	2	0	0	0	0	X	5
(Minnesota) John Shuster	0	4	0	0	0	3	0	1	0	X	8

Sheet 4	1	2	3	4	5	6	7	8	9	10	Final
(Illinois) Kevin Deeren	1	0	2	0	2	0	0	2	0	1	8
(Wisconsin) Craig Brown	0	2	0	2	0	2	0	0	0	0	6

Sheet 5	1	2	3	4	5	6	7	8	9	10	Final
(Minnesota) Chris Plys	1	1	0	0	2	0	0	0	X	X	4
(Washington (state)) Mark Johnson	0	0	1	2	0	1	1	3	X	X	8

==== Draw 2 ====
Sunday, February 22, 12:00

Sheet 1	1	2	3	4	5	6	7	8	9	10	Final
(Washington (state)) Mark Johnson	1	0	3	1	0	0	0	1	0	0	6
(Washington (state)) Greg Romaniuk	0	2	0	0	1	2	1	0	1	1	8

Sheet 2	1	2	3	4	5	6	7	8	9	10	Final
(North Dakota) Craig Disher	0	2	0	2	0	2	0	0	1	X	7
(Minnesota) Chris Plys	1	0	2	0	2	0	2	1	0	X	8

Sheet 3	1	2	3	4	5	6	7	8	9	10	Final
(Minnesota) Todd Birr	2	0	0	1	0	0	2	0	2	1	8
(Illinois) Kevin Deeren	0	0	2	0	2	0	0	2	0	0	6

Sheet 4	1	2	3	4	5	6	7	8	9	10	Final
(Minnesota) John Shuster	0	1	0	0	1	0	X	X	X	X	2
(Minnesota) Tyler George	5	0	2	0	0	2	X	X	X	X	9

Sheet 5	1	2	3	4	5	6	7	8	9	10	Final
(Wisconsin) Craig Brown	0	0	1	0	1	X	X	X	X	X	2
(Minnesota) Mike Farbelow	2	2	0	5	0	X	X	X	X	X	9

==== Draw 3 ====
Sunday, February 22, 20:00

Sheet 1	1	2	3	4	5	6	7	8	9	10	Final
(Minnesota) John Shuster	0	0	1	1	0	1	0	0	0	X	3
(Minnesota) Todd Birr	0	1	0	0	0	0	2	1	1	X	5

Sheet 2	1	2	3	4	5	6	7	8	9	10	11	Final
(Washington (state)) Greg Romaniuk	0	2	0	0	1	0	1	2	1	0	0	7
(Wisconsin) Craig Brown	2	0	0	2	0	2	0	0	0	1	1	8

Sheet 3	1	2	3	4	5	6	7	8	9	10	Final
(Minnesota) Tyler George	1	0	1	1	2	0	2	0	0	1	8
(Washington (state)) Mark Johnson	0	2	0	0	0	0	0	2	2	0	6

Sheet 4	1	2	3	4	5	6	7	8	9	10	Final
(Minnesota) Chris Plys	0	0	1	0	0	1	0	X	X	X	2
(Minnesota) Mike Farbelow	3	1	0	2	1	0	1	X	X	X	8

Sheet 5	1	2	3	4	5	6	7	8	9	10	Final
(Illinois) Kevin Deeren	1	0	1	0	0	0	1	1	1	0	5
(North Dakota) Craig Disher	0	2	0	2	1	1	0	0	0	1	7

==== Draw 4 ====
Monday, February 23, 12:00

Sheet 1	1	2	3	4	5	6	7	8	9	10	Final
(North Dakota) Craig Disher	0	1	0	0	X	X	X	X	X	X	1
(Minnesota) Tyler George	3	0	2	3	X	X	X	X	X	X	8

Sheet 2	1	2	3	4	5	6	7	8	9	10	Final
(Minnesota) Mike Farbelow	1	2	2	0	1	1	X	X	X	X	7
(Illinois) Kevin Deeren	0	0	0	0	0	0	X	X	X	X	0

Sheet 3	1	2	3	4	5	6	7	8	9	10	Final
(Wisconsin) Craig Brown	2	0	0	1	0	2	0	0	2	1	8
(Minnesota) Chris Plys	0	0	1	0	3	0	0	1	0	0	6

Sheet 4	1	2	3	4	5	6	7	8	9	10	Final
(Washington (state)) Greg Romaniuk	0	0	2	0	2	0	1	0	0	X	5
(Minnesota) Todd Birr	1	0	0	2	0	2	0	1	2	X	8

Sheet 5	1	2	3	4	5	6	7	8	9	10	Final
(Washington (state)) Mark Johnson	0	0	0	0	0	1	0	2	0	1	4
(Minnesota) John Shuster	0	0	1	0	1	0	1	0	2	0	5

==== Draw 5 ====
Monday, February 23, 20:00

Sheet 1	1	2	3	4	5	6	7	8	9	10	Final
(Illinois) Kevin Deeren	0	0	0	0	1	0	2	0	3	1	7
(Minnesota) John Shuster	0	0	1	0	0	2	0	1	0	0	4

Sheet 2	1	2	3	4	5	6	7	8	9	10	11	Final
(Minnesota) Tyler George	2	0	0	1	0	3	0	1	0	2	1	10
(Wisconsin) Craig Brown	0	2	1	0	2	0	2	0	2	0	0	9

Sheet 3	1	2	3	4	5	6	7	8	9	10	11	Final
(Washington (state)) Greg Romaniuk	0	2	1	0	2	0	0	2	0	1	1	9
(Minnesota) Mike Farbelow	1	0	0	1	0	1	2	0	3	0	0	8

Sheet 4	1	2	3	4	5	6	7	8	9	10	Final
(Washington (state)) Mark Johnson	2	1	0	0	2	4	0	1	0	X	10
(North Dakota) Craig Disher	0	0	1	4	0	0	1	0	1	X	7

Sheet 5	1	2	3	4	5	6	7	8	9	10	Final
(Minnesota) Chris Plys	0	2	0	2	1	1	0	1	0	X	7
(Minnesota) Todd Birr	1	0	2	0	0	0	1	0	1	X	5

==== Draw 6 ====
Tuesday, February 24, 14:00

Sheet 1	1	2	3	4	5	6	7	8	9	10	Final
(Minnesota) Chris Plys	1	0	0	0	0	0	0	2	0	1	4
(Washington (state)) Greg Romaniuk	0	0	3	0	1	1	0	0	0	0	5

Sheet 2	1	2	3	4	5	6	7	8	9	10	11	Final
(Minnesota) Mike Farbelow	0	1	0	1	0	0	0	0	0	1	0	3
(Washington (state)) Mark Johnson	1	0	1	0	0	0	1	0	0	0	1	4

Sheet 3	1	2	3	4	5	6	7	8	9	10	Final
(Minnesota) John Shuster	1	0	2	0	1	0	1	0	2	X	7
(North Dakota) Craig Disher	0	1	0	1	0	1	0	1	0	X	4

Sheet 4	1	2	3	4	5	6	7	8	9	10	Final
(Minnesota) Todd Birr	1	0	0	1	0	1	0	1	0	X	4
(Wisconsin) Craig Brown	0	2	1	0	1	0	3	0	2	X	9

Sheet 5	1	2	3	4	5	6	7	8	9	10	Final
(Illinois) Kevin Deeren	0	2	0	1	0	1	0	1	0	X	5
(Minnesota) Tyler George	0	0	2	0	2	0	2	0	1	X	7

==== Draw 7 ====
Wednesday, February 25, 8:00

Sheet 1	1	2	3	4	5	6	7	8	9	10	Final
(Minnesota) Mike Farbelow	0	1	0	3	1	0	0	1	0	0	6
(Minnesota) Todd Birr	1	0	1	0	0	0	1	0	1	1	5

Sheet 2	1	2	3	4	5	6	7	8	9	10	Final
(North Dakota) Craig Disher	0	2	1	1	3	X	X	X	X	X	7
(Washington (state)) Greg Romaniuk	0	0	0	0	0	X	X	X	X	X	0

Sheet 3	1	2	3	4	5	6	7	8	9	10	Final
(Washington (state)) Mark Johnson	0	0	0	0	3	0	3	1	1	X	8
(Illinois) Kevin Deeren	0	1	1	0	0	3	0	0	0	X	5

Sheet 4	1	2	3	4	5	6	7	8	9	10	Final
(Minnesota) Tyler George	0	3	0	3	0	1	2	0	X	X	9
(Minnesota) Chris Plys	1	0	1	0	2	0	0	1	X	X	5

Sheet 5	1	2	3	4	5	6	7	8	9	10	Final
(Wisconsin) Craig Brown	0	0	0	1	0	2	0	3	0	X	6
(Minnesota) John Shuster	0	2	0	0	4	0	1	0	2	X	9

==== Draw 8 ====
Wednesday, February 25, 16:00

Sheet 1	1	2	3	4	5	6	7	8	9	10	11	Final
(Wisconsin) Craig Brown	1	0	0	2	1	0	0	2	0	2	2	10
(Washington (state)) Mark Johnson	0	2	0	0	0	2	1	0	3	0	0	8

Sheet 2	1	2	3	4	5	6	7	8	9	10	11	Final
(Minnesota) Chris Plys	1	0	0	2	1	0	0	1	0	2	0	7
(Minnesota) John Shuster	0	0	2	0	0	2	0	0	3	0	1	8

Sheet 3	1	2	3	4	5	6	7	8	9	10	Final
(Minnesota) Mike Farbelow	0	3	0	0	1	0	1	0	0	X	5
(Minnesota) Tyler George	3	0	1	1	0	1	0	1	1	X	8

Sheet 4	1	2	3	4	5	6	7	8	9	10	Final
(Washington (state)) Greg Romaniuk	3	0	0	0	2	0	2	0	0	0	7
(Illinois) Kevin Deeren	0	0	0	2	0	1	0	1	1	1	4

Sheet 5	1	2	3	4	5	6	7	8	9	10	Final
(Minnesota) Todd Birr	0	2	0	2	0	0	0	2	2	X	8
(North Dakota) Craig Disher	1	0	2	0	0	0	1	0	0	X	4

==== Draw 9 ====
Thursday, February 26, 8:00

Sheet 1	1	2	3	4	5	6	7	8	9	10	Final
(Illinois) Kevin Deeren	2	0	2	0	0	0	X	X	X	X	4
(Minnesota) Chris Plys	0	1	0	3	2	3	X	X	X	X	9

Sheet 2	1	2	3	4	5	6	7	8	9	10	Final
(Minnesota) Todd Birr	1	0	2	0	1	0	0	1	0	2	7
(Washington (state)) Mark Johnson	0	2	0	1	0	2	0	0	1	0	6

Sheet 3	1	2	3	4	5	6	7	8	9	10	Final
(North Dakota) Craig Disher	0	0	0	2	0	0	0	0	X	X	2
(Wisconsin) Craig Brown	1	0	1	0	1	1	2	1	X	X	7

Sheet 4	1	2	3	4	5	6	7	8	9	10	Final
(Minnesota) John Shuster	2	0	2	0	4	0	3	X	X	X	11
(Minnesota) Mike Farbelow	0	1	0	1	0	1	0	X	X	X	3

Sheet 5	1	2	3	4	5	6	7	8	9	10	Final
(Minnesota) Tyler George	0	1	1	0	0	1	2	1	0	2	8
(Washington (state)) Greg Romaniuk	2	0	0	2	0	0	0	0	0	0	4

=== Tiebreaker ===
Thursday, February 26, 4:00 pm

Team	1	2	3	4	5	6	7	8	9	10	Final
(Minnesota) John Shuster	0	2	1	2	4	X	X	X	X	X	9
(Minnesota) Todd Birr	1	0	0	0	0	X	X	X	X	X	1

=== Playoffs ===
Page playoff system
1	(Minnesota) Tyler George	6
2	(Minnesota) John Shuster	5
3	(Minnesota) Todd Birr	9
4	(Wisconsin) Craig Brown	6

Semifinal
2	(Minnesota) John Shuster	10
3	(Minnesota) Todd Birr	4

Final
1	(Minnesota) Tyler George	9
2	(Minnesota) John Shuster	10

==== 1 vs. 2 ====
Friday, February 27, 12:00 pm

Team	1	2	3	4	5	6	7	8	9	10	Final
(Minnesota) John Shuster	0	1	0	1	0	1	0	0	2	0	5
(Minnesota) Tyler George	1	0	2	0	0	0	0	2	0	1	6

==== 3 vs. 4 ====
Friday, February 27, 12:00 pm

Team	1	2	3	4	5	6	7	8	9	10	Final
(Wisconsin) Craig Brown	0	1	0	1	1	0	2	0	1	0	6
(Minnesota) Todd Birr	0	0	3	0	0	4	0	1	0	1	9

==== Semifinal ====
Friday, February 27, 8:00 pm

Team	1	2	3	4	5	6	7	8	9	10	Final
(Minnesota) John Shuster	0	2	0	4	0	1	0	3	X	X	10
(Minnesota) Todd Birr	0	0	1	0	2	0	1	0	X	X	4

==== Final ====
Saturday, February 28, 3:00 pm

Team	1	2	3	4	5	6	7	8	9	10	Final
(Minnesota) Tyler George	1	0	3	0	0	3	0	1	0	2	9
(Minnesota) John Shuster	0	1	0	4	1	0	1	0	3	0	10

== Women ==
=== Teams ===
The teams are listed as follows:

Skip	Third	Second	Lead	Alternate	Locale
Gillian Gervais	Sarah Lehman	Stephanie Jensen	Sarah Felchle		Bismarck, North Dakota
Cassandra Potter	Jamie Haskell	Laura Roessler	Jackie Lemke		Minneapolis, Minnesota
Debbie McCormick	Allison Pottinger	Nicole Joraanstad	Natalie Nicholson	Tracy Sachtjen	Rio, Wisconsin
Erika Brown	Nina Spatola	Nina Reiniger	Laura Hallisey		Madison, Wisconsin
Patti Lank	Caitlin Maroldo	Ann Swisshelm	Chrissy Haase		(New York (state)) Lewiston, New York
Charrissa Lin	Tanya Jacobsen	Karen Walker	Nicole Vassar		New Haven, Connecticut
Cristin Clark	Sharon Vukich	Emily Good	Katy Sharpe	Gabrielle Coleman	(Washington (state)) Seattle, Washington
Margie Smith	Norma O'Leary	Becky Johansen	Theresa Hoffoss		Shoreview, Minnesota
Amy Wright	Courtney George	Jordan Moulton	Patti Luke		Duluth, Minnesota
Aileen Sormunen	Molly Bonner	Jessica Schultz	Maureen Brunt	Sophie Brorson	Duluth, Minnesota

=== Round robin standings ===
Key
Teams to playoffs

Skip	W	L
(Wisconsin) Debbie McCormick	8	1
(New York (state)) Patti Lank	7	2
(Minnesota) Amy Wright	7	2
(Wisconsin) Erika Brown	6	3
(Minnesota) Aileen Sormunen	5	4
(Minnesota) Cassandra Potter	4	5
(Minnesota) Norma O'Leary	4	5
(North Dakota) Gillian Gervais	2	7
(Washington (state)) Cristin Clark	2	7
(Connecticut) Charrissa Lin	0	9

=== Round robin results ===
==== Draw 1 ====
Saturday, February 21, 16:00

Sheet 1	1	2	3	4	5	6	7	8	9	10	Final
(Washington (state)) Cristin Clark	0	0	1	0	0	4	0	1	0	X	6
(Minnesota) Cassandra Potter	2	1	0	0	2	0	2	0	4	X	11

Sheet 2	1	2	3	4	5	6	7	8	9	10	Final
(Minnesota) Amy Wright	1	0	0	0	0	0	2	0	0	2	5
(Minnesota) Aileen Sormunen	0	0	0	1	1	0	0	2	0	0	4

Sheet 3	1	2	3	4	5	6	7	8	9	10	Final
(North Dakota) Gillian Gervais	0	0	1	0	1	0	3	0	2	0	7
(New York (state)) Patti Lank	1	0	0	2	0	4	0	1	0	1	9

Sheet 4	1	2	3	4	5	6	7	8	9	10	Final
(Connecticut) Charrissa Lin	1	0	2	0	1	1	0	1	X	X	6
(Wisconsin) Debbie McCormick	0	2	0	3	0	0	5	0	X	X	10

Sheet 5	1	2	3	4	5	6	7	8	9	10	Final
(Minnesota) Norma O'Leary	2	0	0	0	0	0	3	2	0	0	7
(Wisconsin) Erika Brown	0	0	2	2	0	2	0	0	0	2	8

==== Draw 2 ====
Saturday, February 22, 8:00

Sheet 1	1	2	3	4	5	6	7	8	9	10	Final
(Wisconsin) Erika Brown	1	1	0	0	0	1	1	0	2	X	6
(North Dakota) Gillian Gervais	0	0	1	0	1	0	0	1	0	X	3

Sheet 2	1	2	3	4	5	6	7	8	9	10	Final
(Minnesota) Cassandra Potter	0	2	0	0	0	2	0	0	0	X	4
(Minnesota) Norma O'Leary	2	0	0	1	1	0	2	1	1	X	8

Sheet 3	1	2	3	4	5	6	7	8	9	10	Final
(Minnesota) Aileen Sormunen	2	0	1	0	3	0	3	0	2	X	11
(Connecticut) Charrissa Lin	0	1	0	1	0	2	0	4	0	X	8

Sheet 4	1	2	3	4	5	6	7	8	9	10	Final
(New York (state)) Patti Lank	0	2	1	2	0	4	0	0	0	0	9
(Minnesota) Amy Wright	1	0	0	0	4	0	2	1	1	1	10

Sheet 5	1	2	3	4	5	6	7	8	9	10	Final
(Wisconsin) Debbie McCormick	0	1	2	0	0	4	0	3	X	X	10
(Washington (state)) Cristin Clark	1	0	0	0	1	0	1	0	X	X	3

==== Draw 3 ====
Saturday, February 22, 16:00

Sheet 1	1	2	3	4	5	6	7	8	9	10	Final
(New York (state)) Patti Lank	1	1	1	0	1	0	0	3	0	1	8
(Minnesota) Aileen Sormunen	0	0	0	1	0	1	3	0	1	0	6

Sheet 2	1	2	3	4	5	6	7	8	9	10	Final
(North Dakota) Gillian Gervais	0	0	2	0	0	0	2	0	1	X	5
(Wisconsin) Debbie McCormick	1	1	0	3	2	1	0	1	0	X	9

Sheet 3	1	2	3	4	5	6	7	8	9	10	Final
(Minnesota) Amy Wright	0	1	0	0	2	2	0	0	0	X	5
(Wisconsin) Erika Brown	3	0	1	1	0	0	2	1	1	X	9

Sheet 4	1	2	3	4	5	6	7	8	9	10	Final
(Minnesota) Norma O'Leary	0	1	2	1	1	1	0	1	0	X	7
(Washington (state)) Cristin Clark	0	0	0	0	0	0	2	0	1	X	3

Sheet 5	1	2	3	4	5	6	7	8	9	10	Final
(Connecticut) Charrissa Lin	0	0	0	2	0	2	1	0	0	X	5
(Minnesota) Cassandra Potter	2	1	3	0	1	0	0	2	1	X	10

==== Draw 4 ====
Sunday, February 23, 8:00

Sheet 1	1	2	3	4	5	6	7	8	9	10	Final
(Minnesota) Cassandra Potter	0	0	2	0	0	0	0	4	0	0	6
(Minnesota) Amy Wright	1	0	0	0	1	1	1	0	3	3	10

Sheet 2	1	2	3	4	5	6	7	8	9	10	11	Final
(Washington (state)) Cristin Clark	2	0	0	1	0	2	1	0	1	0	1	8
(Connecticut) Charrissa Lin	0	0	4	0	1	0	0	1	0	1	0	7

Sheet 3	1	2	3	4	5	6	7	8	9	10	Final
(Wisconsin) Debbie McCormick	0	1	2	0	2	1	0	0	0	X	6
(Minnesota) Norma O'Leary	0	0	0	1	0	0	2	0	1	X	4

Sheet 4	1	2	3	4	5	6	7	8	9	10	11	Final
(North Dakota) Gillian Gervais	0	1	0	1	2	0	0	0	0	1	2	7
(Minnesota) Aileen Sormunen	1	0	2	0	0	1	1	0	0	0	0	5

Sheet 5	1	2	3	4	5	6	7	8	9	10	Final
(Wisconsin) Erika Brown	0	1	1	0	1	1	0	0	2	X	6
(New York (state)) Patti Lank	4	0	0	2	0	0	1	2	0	X	9

==== Draw 5 ====
Sunday, February 23, 16:00

Sheet 1	1	2	3	4	5	6	7	8	9	10	Final
(Connecticut) Charrissa Lin	1	0	0	2	0	0	0	0	0	X	3
(New York (state)) Patti Lank	0	1	2	0	1	0	1	2	1	X	8

Sheet 2	1	2	3	4	5	6	7	8	9	10	Final
(Minnesota) Amy Wright	0	1	0	0	1	0	0	2	0	1	5
(Wisconsin) Debbie McCormick	1	0	1	0	0	1	1	0	2	0	6

Sheet 3	1	2	3	4	5	6	7	8	9	10	Final
(North Dakota) Gillian Gervais	3	0	1	0	1	1	0	0	0	0	6
(Washington (state)) Cristin Clark	0	1	0	2	0	0	1	1	0	2	7

Sheet 4	1	2	3	4	5	6	7	8	9	10	Final
(Wisconsin) Erika Brown	1	0	0	3	0	1	1	0	1	0	7
(Minnesota) Cassandra Potter	0	2	1	0	3	0	0	2	0	1	9

Sheet 5	1	2	3	4	5	6	7	8	9	10	Final
(Minnesota) Norma O'Leary	0	1	0	0	0	2	1	0	0	0	4
(Minnesota) Aileen Sormunen	3	0	0	0	1	0	0	1	1	2	8

==== Draw 6 ====
Monday, February 24, 10:00

Sheet 1	1	2	3	4	5	6	7	8	9	10	Final
(Minnesota) Norma O'Leary	0	0	0	0	0	2	0	0	3	1	6
(North Dakota) Gillian Gervais	0	0	0	3	0	0	0	2	0	0	5

Sheet 2	1	2	3	4	5	6	7	8	9	10	11	Final
(Washington (state)) Cristin Clark	0	2	0	1	4	0	0	1	0	0	0	8
(Wisconsin) Erika Brown	2	0	1	0	0	2	1	0	1	1	3	11

Sheet 3	1	2	3	4	5	6	7	8	9	10	Final
(New York (state)) Patti Lank	1	1	0	2	0	1	0	0	1	1	7
(Minnesota) Cassandra Potter	0	0	1	0	1	0	1	2	0	0	5

Sheet 4	1	2	3	4	5	6	7	8	9	10	Final
(Minnesota) Aileen Sormunen	3	0	0	1	0	1	0	0	0	0	5
(Wisconsin) Debbie McCormick	0	2	1	0	2	0	0	0	2	1	8

Sheet 5	1	2	3	4	5	6	7	8	9	10	Final
(Connecticut) Charrissa Lin	0	1	0	0	2	0	0	2	0	0	5
(Minnesota) Amy Wright	0	0	2	0	0	1	1	0	1	1	6

==== Draw 7 ====
Monday, February 24, 19:00

Sheet 1	1	2	3	4	5	6	7	8	9	10	Final
(Washington (state)) Cristin Clark	0	1	0	0	0	1	0	1	0	X	3
(Minnesota) Aileen Sormunen	1	0	2	1	1	0	3	0	2	X	10

Sheet 2	1	2	3	4	5	6	7	8	9	10	Final
(Minnesota) Cassandra Potter	1	0	0	1	1	0	0	1	0	2	6
(North Dakota) Gillian Gervais	0	0	1	0	0	0	1	0	1	0	3

Sheet 3	1	2	3	4	5	6	7	8	9	10	Final
(Wisconsin) Erika Brown	1	0	2	2	0	2	0	1	0	0	8
(Connecticut) Charrissa Lin	0	1	0	0	1	0	2	0	2	1	7

Sheet 4	1	2	3	4	5	6	7	8	9	10	Final
(Minnesota) Amy Wright	1	0	0	2	0	4	0	1	0	0	8
(Minnesota) Norma O'Leary	0	2	2	0	1	0	1	0	0	1	7

Sheet 5	1	2	3	4	5	6	7	8	9	10	Final
(Wisconsin) Debbie McCormick	1	2	0	0	0	1	0	1	2	1	8
(New York (state)) Patti Lank	0	0	2	1	1	0	3	0	0	0	7

==== Draw 8 ====
Tuesday, February 25, 12:00

Sheet 1	1	2	3	4	5	6	7	8	9	10	Final
(Wisconsin) Debbie McCormick	0	0	1	0	1	0	2	0	2	0	6
(Wisconsin) Erika Brown	1	1	0	3	0	2	0	1	0	1	9

Sheet 2	1	2	3	4	5	6	7	8	9	10	Final
(Minnesota) Norma O'Leary	0	0	1	0	X	X	X	X	X	X	1
(New York (state)) Patti Lank	3	3	0	3	X	X	X	X	X	X	9

Sheet 3	1	2	3	4	5	6	7	8	9	10	Final
(Washington (state)) Cristin Clark	0	0	1	0	0	0	3	2	1	0	7
(Minnesota) Amy Wright	1	2	0	1	2	1	0	0	0	1	8

Sheet 4	1	2	3	4	5	6	7	8	9	10	Final
(North Dakota) Gillian Gervais	1	1	2	0	1	0	5	0	5	X	15
(Connecticut) Charrissa Lin	0	0	0	1	0	3	0	2	0	X	6

Sheet 5	1	2	3	4	5	6	7	8	9	10	Final
(Minnesota) Aileen Sormunen	1	0	0	2	0	1	0	1	0	3	8
(Minnesota) Cassandra Potter	0	0	2	0	1	0	1	0	1	0	5

==== Draw 9 ====
Tuesday, February 25, 20:00

Sheet 1	1	2	3	4	5	6	7	8	9	10	Final
(Connecticut) Charrissa Lin	0	1	1	0	0	1	0	1	0	X	4
(Minnesota) Norma O'Leary	2	0	0	1	1	0	2	0	1	X	7

Sheet 2	1	2	3	4	5	6	7	8	9	10	Final
(Minnesota) Aileen Sormunen	0	2	0	3	0	2	0	2	0	X	10
(Wisconsin) Erika Brown	1	0	1	0	2	0	1	0	1	X	6

Sheet 3	1	2	3	4	5	6	7	8	9	10	Final
(Minnesota) Cassandra Potter	0	1	0	2	0	1	0	0	0	X	4
(Wisconsin) Debbie McCormick	0	0	3	0	1	0	3	0	3	X	10

Sheet 4	1	2	3	4	5	6	7	8	9	10	Final
(New York (state)) Patti Lank	0	4	0	3	0	0	0	2	X	X	9
(Washington (state)) Cristin Clark	0	0	1	0	0	1	1	0	X	X	3

Sheet 5	1	2	3	4	5	6	7	8	9	10	Final
(Minnesota) Amy Wright	0	2	0	1	2	1	0	0	1	X	7
(North Dakota) Gillian Gervais	2	0	1	0	0	0	1	0	0	X	4

=== Playoffs ===
Page playoff system
1	(Wisconsin) Debbie McCormick	9
2	(Minnesota) Amy Wright	4
3	(New York (state)) Patti Lank	6
4	(Wisconsin) Erika Brown	5

Semifinal
2	(Minnesota) Amy Wright	5
3	(New York (state)) Patti Lank	6

Final
1	(Wisconsin) Debbie McCormick	8
3	(New York (state)) Patti Lank	5

==== 1 vs. 2 ====
Thursday, February 26, 8:00 pm

Team	1	2	3	4	5	6	7	8	9	10	Final
(Minnesota) Amy Wright	0	1	1	0	0	1	0	1	0	X	4
(Wisconsin) Debbie McCormick	2	0	0	2	2	0	1	0	2	X	9

==== 3 vs. 4 ====
Thursday, February 26, 8:00 pm

Team	1	2	3	4	5	6	7	8	9	10	Final
(Wisconsin) Erika Brown	0	1	0	0	2	0	0	1	1	0	5
(New York (state)) Patti Lank	0	0	1	1	0	1	2	0	0	1	6

==== Semifinal ====
Friday, February 27, 4:00 pm

Team	1	2	3	4	5	6	7	8	9	10	Final
(Minnesota) Amy Wright	1	0	1	0	1	1	0	1	0	X	5
(New York (state)) Patti Lank	0	1	0	4	0	0	1	0	0	X	6

==== Final ====
Saturday, February 28, 10:00 am

Team	1	2	3	4	5	6	7	8	9	10	Final
(Wisconsin) Debbie McCormick	1	0	3	0	1	0	0	1	0	2	8
(New York (state)) Patti Lank	0	1	0	2	0	1	0	0	1	0	5
