= 2008 United States Men's Curling Championship =

- Host city: Hibbing, MN
- Arena: Hibbing Curling Club
- Dates: February 16-23, 2008
- Winner: (Wisconsin) Team Brown
- Curling club: Madison CC, McFarland, WI
- Skip: Craig Brown
- Third: Rich Ruohonen
- Second: John Dunlop
- Lead: Pete Annis
- Finalist: (North Dakota) Craig Disher

The 2008 United States Men's Curling Championship was held from February 16 to 23 at the Hibbing Curling Club in Hibbing, Minnesota. It was held in conjunction with the 2008 United States Women's Curling Championship. Craig Brown skipped his team to victory, his second national title. Craig Disher was runner-up for the third year in a row. As national champions, Team Brown earned the opportunity to represent the United States at the 2008 World Men's Curling Championship in Grand Forks, North Dakota, where they finished in 7th place.

== Teams ==
Ten men's teams competed in the 2008 Championship:

Skip	Third	Second	Lead	Alternate Coach	Locale
Todd Birr	Bill Todhunter	Greg Johnson	Kevin Birr	Paul Pustovar	Mankato, Minnesota
Craig Brown	Rich Ruohonen	John Dunlop	Pete Annis		Madison, Wisconsin
Craig Disher	Kevin Kakela	Zach Jacobson	Carey Kakela	Kurt Disher; Joel Jacobson	Rolla, North Dakota
Pete Fenson	Shawn Rojeski	Joe Polo	Tom O'Connor	Bob Fenson	Bemidji, Minnesota
Tyler George	Kris Perkovich	Phill Drobnick	Kevin Johnson	Tom George	Duluth, Minnesota
Jason Larway	Colin Hufman	Greg Persinger	Joel Larway	Steven Demlow	(Washington (state)) Lynnwood, Washington
Jeremy Roe	Pat Roe	Richard Maskel	Mark Hartman	Matt Hamilton	Rio, Wisconsin
Greg Romaniuk	Leon Romaniuk	Doug Pottinger	Mike Calcagno	Cory Yalowicki	(Washington (state)) Snohomish, Washington
John Shuster	Jeff Isaacson	Chris Plys	Shane McKinlay	Jason Smith; Tim Wright	Duluth, Minnesota
Willie Wilberg	Charles Taggart	Alex Leichter	Andrew Quigley	Andy Campbell; Bill Wilberg	Green Bay, Wisconsin

== Round-robin standings ==
Final round-robin standings.

Key
Teams to playoffs
Teams to tiebreakers

Skip	W	L
(Wisconsin) Craig Brown	7	2
(North Dakota) Craig Disher	6	3
(Washington (state)) Greg Romaniuk	6	3
(Minnesota) Tyler George	6	3
(Washington (state)) Jason Larway	6	3
(Minnesota) Pete Fenson	4	5
(Minnesota) John Shuster	4	5
(Minnesota) Todd Birr	3	6
(Wisconsin) Jeremy Roe	2	7
(Wisconsin) Willie Wilberg	1	8

== Round-robin results ==
All draw times are listed in Central Standard Time (UTC−6).

=== Draw 1 ===
Saturday, February 16, 6:00pm

Team	1	2	3	4	5	6	7	8	9	10	Final
Todd Birr	0	0	1	0	1	0	X	X	X	X	2
Greg Romaniuk	0	1	0	4	0	3	X	X	X	X	8

Team	1	2	3	4	5	6	7	8	9	10	Final
Craig Brown	0	3	1	0	2	1	X	X	X	X	7
John Shuster	0	0	0	1	0	0	X	X	X	X	1

Team	1	2	3	4	5	6	7	8	9	10	Final
Pete Fenson	0	1	0	0	1	0	3	0	4	0	9
Jeremy Roe	0	0	2	1	0	2	0	1	0	1	7

Team	1	2	3	4	5	6	7	8	9	10	Final
Jason Larway	2	3	1	0	2	0	0	2	X	X	10
Willie Wilberg	0	0	0	1	0	2	0	0	X	X	3

Team	1	2	3	4	5	6	7	8	9	10	Final
Craig Disher	0	1	0	1	0	2	0	0	0	1	5
Tyler George	1	0	0	0	1	0	1	0	1	0	4

=== Draw 2 ===
Saturday, February 16, 6:00pm

Team	1	2	3	4	5	6	7	8	9	10	11	Final
Jeremy Roe	1	0	0	6	0	0	1	0	0	1	0	9
Craig Disher	0	2	2	0	1	1	0	3	0	0	1	10

Team	1	2	3	4	5	6	7	8	9	10	Final
Tyler George	0	0	1	0	1	1	0	2	0	2	7
Todd Birr	0	1	0	2	0	0	1	0	1	0	5

Team	1	2	3	4	5	6	7	8	9	10	Final
Willie Wilberg	0	0	0	2	0	1	0	1	X	X	4
Craig Brown	0	2	2	0	4	0	1	0	X	X	9

Team	1	2	3	4	5	6	7	8	9	10	Final
John Shuster	0	3	0	0	0	1	0	1	0	0	5
Pete Fenson	1	0	0	2	0	0	1	0	1	1	6

Team	1	2	3	4	5	6	7	8	9	10	Final
Greg Romaniuk	1	0	1	0	2	0	0	1	0	X	5
Jason Larway	0	2	0	2	0	0	3	0	1	X	8

=== Draw 3 ===
Sunday, February 17, 2:00pm

Team	1	2	3	4	5	6	7	8	9	10	Final
Craig Brown	1	0	2	0	2	0	1	2	0	1	9
Pete Fenson	0	2	0	1	0	1	0	0	2	0	6

Team	1	2	3	4	5	6	7	8	9	10	Final
Jason Larway	0	2	4	0	0	2	0	0	3	X	11
Jeremy Roe	1	0	0	1	1	0	2	1	0	X	6

Team	1	2	3	4	5	6	7	8	9	10	11	Final
Craig Disher	1	0	2	2	0	0	0	2	1	0	1	9
John Shuster	0	3	0	0	3	1	0	0	0	1	0	8

Team	1	2	3	4	5	6	7	8	9	10	Final
Greg Romaniuk	0	1	0	2	0	1	0	0	1	1	6
Tyler George	2	0	1	0	1	0	0	1	0	0	5

Team	1	2	3	4	5	6	7	8	9	10	Final
Todd Birr	0	2	0	0	2	0	1	0	2	X	7
Willie Wilberg	0	0	2	0	0	1	0	1	0	X	4

=== Draw 4 ===
Monday, February 18, 12:00pm

Team	1	2	3	4	5	6	7	8	9	10	11	Final
John Shuster	0	0	2	0	1	0	1	0	3	0	2	9
Todd Birr	1	0	0	2	0	1	0	2	0	1	0	7

Team	1	2	3	4	5	6	7	8	9	10	11	Final
Willie Wilberg	0	1	0	2	0	0	2	0	0	2	0	7
Greg Romaniuk	0	0	1	0	2	1	0	2	1	0	3	10

Team	1	2	3	4	5	6	7	8	9	10	Final
Tyler George	0	3	0	3	0	0	2	X	X	X	8
Jason Larway	0	0	3	0	1	0	0	X	X	X	4

Team	1	2	3	4	5	6	7	8	9	10	Final
Craig Brown	3	0	7	0	0	X	X	X	X	X	10
Jeremy Roe	0	1	0	1	0	X	X	X	X	X	2

Team	1	2	3	4	5	6	7	8	9	10	Final
Pete Fenson	2	0	0	0	1	0	1	2	0	1	7
Craig Disher	0	1	0	0	0	3	0	0	2	0	6

=== Draw 5 ===
Monday, February 18, 8:00pm

Team	1	2	3	4	5	6	7	8	9	10	Final
Pete Fenson	0	0	1	0	2	0	0	0	0	1	4
Willie Wilberg	0	1	0	2	0	1	1	0	1	0	6

Team	1	2	3	4	5	6	7	8	9	10	Final
Jason Larway	0	1	0	2	0	0	0	1	0	X	4
John Shuster	0	0	1	0	0	3	2	0	1	X	7

Team	1	2	3	4	5	6	7	8	9	10	Final
Greg Romaniuk	1	0	1	0	2	0	0	2	0	X	6
Jeremy Roe	0	1	0	1	0	1	0	0	1	X	4

Team	1	2	3	4	5	6	7	8	9	10	Final
Todd Birr	0	1	1	0	0	1	0	3	0	1	7
Craig Disher	1	0	0	1	1	0	3	0	2	0	8

Team	1	2	3	4	5	6	7	8	9	10	Final
Craig Brown	0	1	0	0	1	0	2	0	X	X	4
Tyler George	2	0	2	1	0	1	0	3	X	X	9

=== Draw 6 ===
Tuesday, February 19, 2:00pm

Team	1	2	3	4	5	6	7	8	9	10	Final
Jeremy Roe	0	0	0	1	0	2	0	0	X	X	3
Tyler George	2	0	1	0	1	0	2	2	X	X	8

Team	1	2	3	4	5	6	7	8	9	10	Final
Craig Disher	0	1	0	2	0	1	1	3	X	X	8
Greg Romaniuk	0	0	1	0	2	0	0	0	X	X	3

Team	1	2	3	4	5	6	7	8	9	10	Final
Todd Birr	1	3	3	2	X	X	X	X	X	X	9
Pete Fenson	0	0	0	0	X	X	X	X	X	X	0

Team	1	2	3	4	5	6	7	8	9	10	Final
Jason Larway	0	0	1	1	0	1	1	0	0	X	4
Craig Brown	1	0	0	0	4	0	0	2	1	X	8

Team	1	2	3	4	5	6	7	8	9	10	Final
John Shuster	2	2	2	0	2	X	X	X	X	X	8
Willie Wilberg	0	0	0	1	0	X	X	X	X	X	1

=== Draw 7 ===
Wednesday, February 20, 8:00am

Team	1	2	3	4	5	6	7	8	9	10	Final
Craig Brown	0	3	1	0	2	0	0	0	2	0	8
Greg Romaniuk	2	0	0	1	0	2	1	1	0	2	9

Team	1	2	3	4	5	6	7	8	9	10	Final
Jeremy Roe	0	0	0	2	0	0	1	0	0	0	3
Todd Birr	1	0	1	0	1	0	0	1	0	2	6

Team	1	2	3	4	5	6	7	8	9	10	Final
Willie Wilberg	1	0	0	0	0	X	X	X	X	X	1
Craig Disher	0	0	1	5	1	X	X	X	X	X	7

Team	1	2	3	4	5	6	7	8	9	10	Final
Tyler George	1	0	0	2	0	1	0	2	0	2	8
John Shuster	0	0	1	0	2	0	2	0	2	0	7

Team	1	2	3	4	5	6	7	8	9	10	Final
Pete Fenson	0	2	0	0	0	2	0	0	1	X	5
Jason Larway	1	0	0	1	1	0	3	1	0	X	7

=== Draw 8 ===
Wednesday, February 20, 4:00pm

Team	1	2	3	4	5	6	7	8	9	10	Final
Craig Disher	0	1	0	1	1	0	0	0	1	0	4
Jason Larway	0	0	2	0	0	1	1	1	0	1	6

Team	1	2	3	4	5	6	7	8	9	10	Final
Pete Fenson	2	0	1	0	4	0	2	2	X	X	11
Tyler George	0	1	0	2	0	2	0	0	X	X	5

Team	1	2	3	4	5	6	7	8	9	10	Final
John Shuster	3	0	0	3	0	0	0	3	1	X	10
Greg Romaniuk	0	2	2	0	1	0	1	0	0	X	6

Team	1	2	3	4	5	6	7	8	9	10	Final
Willie Wilberg	0	0	0	1	0	2	0	1	0	X	4
Jeremy Roe	0	1	0	0	2	0	2	0	1	X	6

Team	1	2	3	4	5	6	7	8	9	10	Final
Todd Birr	0	0	1	0	0	2	2	0	0	X	5
Craig Brown	0	2	0	0	2	0	0	5	0	X	9

=== Draw 9 ===
Thursday, February 21, 8:00am

Team	1	2	3	4	5	6	7	8	9	10	Final
Tyler George	0	2	0	1	1	0	3	0	0	2	9
Willie Wilberg	2	0	2	0	0	1	0	0	3	0	8

Team	1	2	3	4	5	6	7	8	9	10	Final
Craig Disher	0	0	0	1	0	1	2	0	1	0	5
Craig Brown	0	0	2	0	1	0	0	2	0	2	7

Team	1	2	3	4	5	6	7	8	9	10	Final
Jason Larway	2	0	0	2	0	1	2	0	X	X	7
Todd Birr	0	0	1	0	2	0	0	0	X	X	3

Team	1	2	3	4	5	6	7	8	9	10	Final
Greg Romaniuk	0	1	1	2	1	0	0	4	X	X	9
Pete Fenson	1	0	0	0	0	1	1	0	X	X	3

Team	1	2	3	4	5	6	7	8	9	10	Final
Jeremy Roe	2	1	0	1	0	2	1	1	0	X	8
John Shuster	0	0	2	0	1	0	0	0	1	X	4

== Tiebreaker ==
Team	1	2	3	4	5	6	7	8	9	10	Final
Jason Larway	0	1	1	1	0	0	5	X	X	X	8
Tyler George	1	0	0	0	1	0	0	X	X	X	2

== Playoffs ==
Page playoff system
1	(Wisconsin) Craig Brown	6
2	(North Dakota) Craig Disher	9
3	(Washington (state)) Greg Romaniuk	5
4	(Washington (state)) Jason Larway	7

Semifinal
1	(Wisconsin) Craig Brown	7
4	(Washington (state)) Jason Larway	2

Final
2	(North Dakota) Craig Disher	6
1	(Wisconsin) Craig Brown	9

=== 1 vs. 2 ===
Friday, February 22, 12:00pm

Team	1	2	3	4	5	6	7	8	9	10	Final
(Wisconsin) Craig Brown	0	1	0	1	0	0	3	0	1	X	6
(North Dakota) Craig Disher	1	0	3	0	1	2	0	2	0	X	9

=== 3 vs. 4 ===
Friday, February 22, 12:00pm

Team	1	2	3	4	5	6	7	8	9	10	Final
(Washington (state)) Greg Romaniuk	1	0	0	0	1	0	1	0	2	0	5
(Washington (state)) Jason Larway	0	2	0	1	0	2	0	1	0	1	7

=== Semifinal ===
Friday, February 22, 7:00pm

Team	1	2	3	4	5	6	7	8	9	10	Final
(Wisconsin) Craig Brown	0	1	1	0	0	3	1	0	1	X	7
(Washington (state)) Jason Larway	0	0	0	1	0	0	0	1	0	X	2

=== Final ===
Saturday, February 23, 3:00pm

Team	1	2	3	4	5	6	7	8	9	10	Final
(North Dakota) Craig Disher	0	1	0	0	2	0	1	0	2	0	6
(Wisconsin) Craig Brown	0	0	2	2	0	1	0	3	0	1	9
