= 2011 United States Men's Curling Championship =

- Host city: Fargo, North Dakota
- Arena: Scheels Arena
- Dates: February 12–19, 2011
- Winner: (Minnesota) Pete Fenson
- Curling club: Bemidji CC, Bemidji, Minnesota
- Skip: Pete Fenson
- Third: Shawn Rojeski
- Second: Joe Polo
- Lead: Ryan Brunt
- Finalist: (Minnesota) Tyler George

The 2011 United States Men's Curling Championship took place on February 12–19 at the Scheels Arena in Fargo, North Dakota. It was held in conjunction with the 2011 United States Women's Curling Championship. After a win over the Tyler George rink, Pete Fenson and his team became champions for the second consecutive time. They represented the United States at the 2011 World Championships in Regina, Saskatchewan, finishing in 10th place after an unfortunate series of close losses dropped their win–loss record to 3-8. It is the worst finish by an American men's team at the world championships to date.

== Road to the Nationals ==
Teams qualified for the men's nationals in one of two ways. Two teams automatically qualified as the top two US teams on the Order of Merit list after the Curl Mesabi Cash Spiel is completed. This year, those two teams are the Pete Fenson and Tyler George rinks.

The remaining eight spots for the nationals were awarded to the top finishers in the regional qualifiers and challenge rounds. Five teams qualified from the qualifiers round, where each qualified site received one or more qualifying spots. The other three spots went to the winners of the challenge round.

== Teams ==
Skip	Third	Second	Lead	Alternate	Locale	Qualification Method
Pete Fenson	Shawn Rojeski	Joe Polo	Ryan Brunt		(Minnesota) Bemidji	Top 1 US Order of Merit
Tyler George	Christopher Plys	Rich Ruohonen	Phill Drobnick		(Minnesota) Eveleth	Top 2 US Order of Merit
Craig Brown	John Shuster	Greg Johnson	Derrick Casper	Jeremiah Dotlich	(Wisconsin) Madison	Medford Qualifier
Geoff Goodland	Pete Westberg	Tim Solin	Ken Olson	Tim Jeanetta	(Wisconsin) Eau Claire	Medford Qualifier
Craig Disher	Kevin Kakela	Chad Carlson	Pete Annis	John Benton	(North Dakota) Rolla	Bismarck Qualifier
Jason Larway	Colin Hufman	Sean Beighton	Joel Larway		(Washington (state)) Seattle	Bismarck Qualifier
Heath McCormick	Bill Stopera	Martin Sather	Dean Gemmell		(New York (state)) Rochester	Rochester Qualifier
Todd Birr	Greg Romaniuk	Doug Pottinger	Tom O'Connor	Kevin Birr	(Minnesota) Mankato	Challenge Round
Zach Jacobson	Kevin Deeren	Zane Jacobson	Kraig Deeren	Mike Farbelow	(North Dakota) Langdon	Challenge Round
Matt Hamilton	Jeremy Roe	Joseph Bonfoey	Patrick Roe	Paul Pustovar	(Wisconsin) Madison	Challenge Round

== Round-robin standings ==
Through Draw 9

Team (Skip)	W	L	PF	PA	Ends Won	Ends Lost	Blank Ends	Stolen Ends
(Minnesota) Pete Fenson	9	0	72	42	44	32	1	17
(Minnesota) Tyler George	7	2	68	53	35	32	7	3
(Minnesota) Todd Birr	6	3	71	49	42	29	1	16
(New York (state)) Heath McCormick	6	3	61	42	34	34	3	8
(North Dakota) Zach Jacobson	5	4	52	53	29	39	9	3
(Wisconsin) Craig Brown	4	5	61	59	38	35	3	9
(Wisconsin) Matt Hamilton	3	6	53	63	35	39	6	8
(North Dakota) Craig Disher	2	7	45	64	32	35	5	9
(Washington (state)) Jason Larway	2	7	48	70	27	35	2	5
(Wisconsin) Geoff Goodland	1	8	44	70	35	42	5	7

== Round-robin results ==
All times listed in Central Standard Time.

=== Draw 1 ===
Saturday, February 12, 8:30 pm

Sheet A	1	2	3	4	5	6	7	8	9	10	11	Final
(Wisconsin) Matt Hamilton	1	1	0	0	0	1	3	0	0	0	1	7
(Wisconsin) Craig Brown	0	0	2	0	1	0	0	2	0	1	0	6

Sheet B	1	2	3	4	5	6	7	8	9	10	Final
(North Dakota) Craig Disher	2	1	2	0	1	0	2	0	1	X	9
(Washington (state)) Jason Larway	0	0	0	2	0	1	0	1	0	X	4

Sheet C	1	2	3	4	5	6	7	8	9	10	Final
(Minnesota) Todd Birr	1	0	3	0	2	1	0	0	1	0	8
(North Dakota) Zach Jacobson	0	2	0	3	0	0	0	2	0	3	10

Sheet D	1	2	3	4	5	6	7	8	9	10	Final
(Minnesota) Pete Fenson	0	0	1	1	1	0	2	0	0	1	6
(Wisconsin) Geoff Goodland	1	1	0	0	0	1	0	0	1	0	4

Sheet E	1	2	3	4	5	6	7	8	9	10	Final
(New York (state)) Heath McCormick	0	0	2	0	0	0	1	1	0	2	6
(Minnesota) Tyler George	1	1	0	0	2	0	0	0	1	0	5

=== Draw 2 ===
Sunday, February 13, 12:00 pm

Sheet A	1	2	3	4	5	6	7	8	9	10	Final
(Minnesota) Tyler George	0	0	2	0	2	0	1	0	0	2	7
(North Dakota) Zach Jacobson	0	1	0	1	0	1	0	3	0	0	6

Sheet B	1	2	3	4	5	6	7	8	9	10	Final
(New York (state)) Heath McCormick	0	2	0	0	4	0	1	0	2	X	9
(Wisconsin) Craig Brown	2	0	1	1	0	1	0	1	0	X	6

Sheet C	1	2	3	4	5	6	7	8	9	10	Final
(Wisconsin) Geoff Goodland	1	0	1	0	2	0	2	0	X	X	6
(Washington (state)) Jason Larway	0	1	0	6	0	3	0	3	X	X	13

Sheet D	1	2	3	4	5	6	7	8	9	10	Final
(Minnesota) Todd Birr	0	0	1	1	0	0	2	4	X	X	7
(North Dakota) Craig Disher	0	1	0	0	0	1	0	0	X	X	2

Sheet E	1	2	3	4	5	6	7	8	9	10	Final
(Minnesota) Pete Fenson	2	0	1	0	3	1	1	X	X	X	8
(Wisconsin) Matt Hamilton	0	1	0	1	0	0	0	X	X	X	2

=== Draw 3 ===
Sunday, February 13, 8:00 pm

Sheet A	1	2	3	4	5	6	7	8	9	10	Final
(Minnesota) Todd Birr	1	0	0	1	0	0	2	0	3	X	7
(Washington (state)) Jason Larway	0	2	0	0	0	1	0	1	0	X	4

Sheet B	1	2	3	4	5	6	7	8	9	10	Final
(North Dakota) Zach Jacobson	0	0	0	0	1	0	0	1	0	X	2
(Minnesota) Pete Fenson	0	1	0	1	0	1	2	0	1	X	6

Sheet C	1	2	3	4	5	6	7	8	9	10	Final
(North Dakota) Craig Disher	1	0	0	2	0	1	0	X	X	X	4
(Minnesota) Tyler George	0	0	2	0	5	0	2	X	X	X	9

Sheet D	1	2	3	4	5	6	7	8	9	10	Final
(New York (state)) Heath McCormick	0	1	0	1	0	2	0	1	0	X	5
(Wisconsin) Matt Hamilton	0	0	1	0	3	0	1	0	3	X	8

Sheet E	1	2	3	4	5	6	7	8	9	10	Final
(Wisconsin) Geoff Goodland	1	0	1	0	1	0	1	1	0	0	5
(Wisconsin) Craig Brown	0	1	0	2	0	1	0	0	0	2	6

=== Draw 4 ===
Monday, February 14, 12:00 pm

Sheet A	1	2	3	4	5	6	7	8	9	10	Final
(Wisconsin) Craig Brown	2	0	0	0	1	0	2	0	3	X	8
(North Dakota) Craig Disher	0	0	0	2	0	2	0	2	0	X	6

Sheet B	1	2	3	4	5	6	7	8	9	10	Final
(Wisconsin) Matt Hamilton	0	2	1	0	3	0	2	2	0	X	10
(Wisconsin) Geoff Goodland	2	0	0	1	0	3	0	0	0	X	6

Sheet C	1	2	3	4	5	6	7	8	9	10	Final
(New York (state)) Heath McCormick	0	1	0	0	1	0	2	0	0	X	4
(Minnesota) Pete Fenson	1	0	1	1	0	1	0	2	3	X	9

Sheet D	1	2	3	4	5	6	7	8	9	10	Final
(North Dakota) Zach Jacobson	0	2	0	0	1	1	0	0	3	X	7
(Washington (state)) Jason Larway	2	0	1	1	0	0	1	0	0	X	5

Sheet E	1	2	3	4	5	6	7	8	9	10	Final
(Minnesota) Tyler George	0	3	0	0	1	2	0	1	2	X	9
(Minnesota) Todd Birr	2	0	2	0	0	0	1	0	0	X	5

=== Draw 5 ===
Monday, February 14, 8:00 pm

Sheet A	1	2	3	4	5	6	7	8	9	10	Final
(Wisconsin) Geoff Goodland	0	0	1	0	0	0	X	X	X	X	1
(Minnesota) Todd Birr	2	1	0	2	2	1	X	X	X	X	8

Sheet B	1	2	3	4	5	6	7	8	9	10	Final
(Minnesota) Pete Fenson	0	0	1	0	0	3	1	0	1	1	7
(North Dakota) Craig Disher	1	1	0	1	2	0	0	0	0	0	5

Sheet C	1	2	3	4	5	6	7	8	9	10	Final
(North Dakota) Zach Jacobson	3	0	0	4	0	1	0	X	X	X	8
(Wisconsin) Matt Hamilton	0	0	1	0	1	0	1	X	X	X	3

Sheet D	1	2	3	4	5	6	7	8	9	10	11	Final
(Wisconsin) Craig Brown	0	2	0	2	0	0	1	0	1	1	0	7
(Minnesota) Tyler George	2	0	2	0	2	0	0	1	0	0	1	8

Sheet E	1	2	3	4	5	6	7	8	9	10	Final
(Washington (state)) Jason Larway	0	2	0	1	1	0	2	0	1	0	7
(New York (state)) Heath McCormick	1	0	2	0	0	1	0	4	0	3	11

=== Draw 6 ===
Tuesday, February 15, 2:30 pm

Sheet A	1	2	3	4	5	6	7	8	9	10	Final
(North Dakota) Zach Jacobson	0	0	0	1	0	0	0	1	X	X	2
(New York (state)) Heath McCormick	1	1	0	0	2	1	1	0	X	X	6

Sheet B	1	2	3	4	5	6	7	8	9	10	Final
(Minnesota) Tyler George	0	1	0	1	0	2	0	0	0	2	6
(Wisconsin) Matt Hamilton	1	0	2	0	1	0	0	1	0	0	5

Sheet C	1	2	3	4	5	6	7	8	9	10	Final
(Wisconsin) Craig Brown	0	2	0	1	0	2	0	0	X	X	5
(Minnesota) Todd Birr	2	0	1	0	2	0	2	3	X	X	10

Sheet D	1	2	3	4	5	6	7	8	9	10	Final
(Washington (state)) Jason Larway	1	0	0	0	2	0	0	1	X	X	4
(Minnesota) Pete Fenson	0	3	3	0	0	1	1	0	X	X	8

Sheet E	1	2	3	4	5	6	7	8	9	10	Final
(North Dakota) Craig Disher	0	0	0	0	1	0	1	1	1	0	4
(Wisconsin) Geoff Goodland	1	1	1	1	0	1	0	0	0	1	6

=== Draw 7 ===
Wednesday, February 16, 8:00 am

Sheet A	1	2	3	4	5	6	7	8	9	10	Final
(Washington (state)) Jason Larway	0	3	0	0	0	2	0	0	1	1	7
(Wisconsin) Matt Hamilton	1	0	0	0	1	0	2	1	0	0	5

Sheet B	1	2	3	4	5	6	7	8	9	10	Final
(Wisconsin) Craig Brown	1	1	0	2	1	3	0	1	X	X	9
(North Dakota) Zach Jacobson	0	0	3	0	0	0	1	0	X	X	4

Sheet C	1	2	3	4	5	6	7	8	9	10	11	Final
(Minnesota) Tyler George	0	2	0	0	1	1	0	3	0	0	1	8
(Wisconsin) Geoff Goodland	2	0	1	0	0	0	1	0	2	1	0	7

Sheet D	1	2	3	4	5	6	7	8	9	10	Final
(North Dakota) Craig Disher	2	0	0	0	X	X	X	X	X	X	2
(New York (state)) Heath McCormick	0	5	1	3	X	X	X	X	X	X	9

Sheet E	1	2	3	4	5	6	7	8	9	10	11	Final
(Minnesota) Todd Birr	1	0	0	1	2	0	1	0	2	1	0	8
(Minnesota) Pete Fenson	0	3	2	0	0	2	0	1	0	0	1	9

=== Draw 8 ===
Wednesday, February 16, 4:00 pm

Sheet A	1	2	3	4	5	6	7	8	9	10	Final
(Minnesota) Pete Fenson	4	0	0	1	0	3	0	0	2	X	10
(Minnesota) Tyler George	0	2	1	0	3	0	1	1	0	X	8

Sheet B	1	2	3	4	5	6	7	8	9	10	Final
(Minnesota) Todd Birr	1	1	4	0	3	0	X	X	X	X	9
(New York (state)) Heath McCormick	0	0	0	2	0	1	X	X	X	X	3

Sheet C	1	2	3	4	5	6	7	8	9	10	Final
(Wisconsin) Matt Hamilton	3	0	0	1	0	2	0	1	0	0	7
(North Dakota) Craig Disher	0	2	1	0	2	0	2	0	1	1	9

Sheet D	1	2	3	4	5	6	7	8	9	10	Final
(Wisconsin) Geoff Goodland	0	1	0	2	0	1	0	0	1	0	5
(North Dakota) Zach Jacobson	2	0	1	0	1	0	0	2	0	1	7

Sheet E	1	2	3	4	5	6	7	8	9	10	Final
(Wisconsin) Craig Brown	3	1	2	0	3	X	X	X	X	X	9
(Washington (state)) Jason Larway	0	0	0	1	0	X	X	X	X	X	1

=== Draw 9 ===
Thursday, February 17, 8:00 am

Sheet A	1	2	3	4	5	6	7	8	9	10	Final
(New York (state)) Heath McCormick	2	0	1	1	0	0	0	4	0	X	8
(Wisconsin) Geoff Goodland	0	1	0	0	0	0	2	0	1	X	4

Sheet B	1	2	3	4	5	6	7	8	9	10	Final
(Washington (state)) Jason Larway	0	1	1	0	0	1	0	X	X	X	3
(Minnesota) Tyler George	1	0	0	2	3	0	2	X	X	X	8

Sheet C	1	2	3	4	5	6	7	8	9	10	Final
(Minnesota) Pete Fenson	0	1	1	1	0	0	4	0	2	X	9
(Wisconsin) Craig Brown	2	0	0	0	0	2	0	1	0	X	5

Sheet D	1	2	3	4	5	6	7	8	9	10	Final
(Wisconsin) Matt Hamilton	1	0	0	1	3	0	0	0	1	0	6
(Minnesota) Todd Birr	0	1	1	0	0	1	1	2	0	2	8

Sheet E	1	2	3	4	5	6	7	8	9	10	Final
(North Dakota) Zach Jacobson	1	0	0	0	0	1	4	0	0	X	6
(North Dakota) Craig Disher	0	1	0	0	0	0	0	2	1	X	4

== Playoffs ==
Page playoff system
1	(Minnesota) Pete Fenson	11
2	(Minnesota) Tyler George	7
3	(Minnesota) Todd Birr	9
4	(New York (state)) Heath McCormick	5

Semifinal
2	(Minnesota) Tyler George	8
3	(Minnesota) Todd Birr	7

Final
1	(Minnesota) Pete Fenson	6
2	(Minnesota) Tyler George	5

=== 1 vs. 2 game ===
Friday, February 18, 12:00 pm

Team	1	2	3	4	5	6	7	8	9	10	Final
(Minnesota) Pete Fenson	0	0	2	0	4	1	0	1	0	3	11
(Minnesota) Tyler George	1	2	0	1	0	0	1	0	2	0	7

=== 3 vs. 4 game ===
Friday, February 18, 12:00 pm

Team	1	2	3	4	5	6	7	8	9	10	Final
(Minnesota) Todd Birr	2	0	0	1	0	3	2	0	1	X	9
(New York (state)) Heath McCormick	0	0	1	0	2	0	0	2	0	X	5

=== Semifinal ===
Friday, February 18, 8:00 pm

Team	1	2	3	4	5	6	7	8	9	10	Final
(Minnesota) Tyler George	3	1	0	1	2	0	0	0	0	1	8
(Minnesota) Todd Birr	0	0	1	0	0	2	1	3	0	0	7

=== Championship final ===
Saturday, February 19, 3:00 pm

Fenson opened up the final of the men's championship with a draw against two to barely secure shot rock, scoring a single in the first end. George came back with a draw for three after Fenson threw a draw too heavy, taking an early lead after the third. Fenson responded with a hit and stick shot to score a deuce, and George drew to the button for a single in the fifth. After the break, Fenson blanked two ends before a heavy draw in the eighth left him with only one point, tying the game. Fenson forced George to take a single in the ninth end, giving George the lead, but Fenson tied the game in the final end with a takeout. In the extra end, Fenson drew to the eight-foot circle with his last stone, and George's hammer stone crashed on a rock in the top twelve-foot, leaving Fenson a steal of one point and the win.

Team	1	2	3	4	5	6	7	8	9	10	11	Final
(Minnesota) Pete Fenson	1	0	0	2	0	0	0	1	0	1	1	6
(Minnesota) Tyler George	0	0	3	0	1	0	0	0	1	0	0	5
