= Greg Romaniuk =

Canadian-American curler

- Curler ♂
- Born: August 24, 1971 (age 55); Regina, Saskatchewan, Canada

Team
- Curling club: Granite CC, Seattle, WA

Curling career
- Member Association: Manitoba (1988-1993) (Washington (state)) Washington (1998-present)
- World Championship: 1 (2001)
Medal record
Curling
United States Men's Championship
Gold medal – first place	2001 Madison
Silver medal – second place	2003 Utica
Bronze medal – third place	2011 Fargo

Greg Romaniuk (born August 24, 1971) is a Canadian-American curler from Snohomish, Washington. He grew up in Winnipeg, Manitoba.

At the national level, he is a 2001 United States men's champion curler.

== Teams ==
Season	Skip	Third	Second	Lead	Alternate	Coach	Events
1988–89	Lyall Hudson	Greg Romaniuk	Dale Goehring	Rod Guilford			CJCC 1989 (8th)
1989–90	Lyall Hudson	Greg Romaniuk	Mike Mansell	Rod Guilford			CJCC 1990 (silver)
1992–93	Lyall Hudson	Kevin Thompson	Greg Romaniuk	Bruce Jones			
1998–99	Greg Romaniuk	Ken Trask	Rodger Schnee	Bob Knievel			
1999–00	Greg Romaniuk	Leon Romaniuk	Ken Trask	Brandon Way			
2000–01	Jason Larway	Greg Romaniuk	Travis Way	Joel Larway	Doug Kauffman	Jack McNelly	USMCC 2001 (gold); WCC 2001 (6th)
2001–02	Jason Larway	Greg Romaniuk	Joel Larway	Doug Kauffman			USMCC 2002 (6th)
2002–03	Craig Brown	Leon Romaniuk	Greg Romaniuk	Darren Lehto			USMCC 2003 (silver)
2003–04	Wes Johnson	Leon Romaniuk	Greg Romaniuk	Steve Lundeen			
2006–07	Brady Clark	Greg Romaniuk	Derek Surka	Bill Rugen			
2007–08	Greg Romaniuk	Leon Romaniuk	Doug Pottinger	Mike Calcagno	Cory Yalowicki		USMCC 2008 (4th)
2008–09	Greg Romaniuk	Doug Pottinger	Leon Romaniuk	Troy Schroeder			USMCC 2009/ USOCT 2009 (5th)
2010–11	Wes Johnson	Greg Romaniuk	?	Steve Lundeen			
2010–11	Todd Birr	Greg Romaniuk	Doug Pottinger	Tom O'Connor	Kevin Birr		USMCC 2011 (bronze)
2011–12	Todd Birr	Greg Romaniuk	Doug Pottinger	Tom O'Connor	Kevin Birr		USMCC 2012 (7th)
2012–13	Todd Birr	Doug Pottinger	Greg Romaniuk	Tom O'Connor	Kevin Birr		USMCC 2013 (9th)

== Personal life ==
His brother Leon is a curler too. The two brothers curled together for many years.

He started curling in 1984 when he was at the age of 13.

As of 2016, he works as a mechanical engineer with CDI Engineers.
