= 2005 United States Olympic curling trials =

2005 United States Olympic Curling Trials/ 2005 United States National Curling Championships
- Host city: McFarland, Wisconsin
- Arena: Madison Curling Club
- Dates: February 19–26
- Men's winner: Pete Fenson
- Skip: Pete Fenson
- Third: Shawn Rojeski
- Second: Joe Polo
- Lead: John Shuster
- Finalist: Craig Brown
- Women's winner: Cassandra Johnson
- Skip: Cassandra Johnson
- Third: Jamie Johnson
- Second: Jessica Schultz
- Lead: Maureen Brunt
- Finalist: Debbie McCormick

The 2005 United States Olympic Curling Trials were held from February 19 to 26 in McFarland, Wisconsin. The trials determined which teams would represent the United States at the 2006 Winter Olympics. The trials also constituted the 2005 United States National Curling Championships, qualifying teams to the 2005 Ford World Men's Curling Championship and the 2005 Ford World Women's Curling Championship.

== Men ==
=== Teams ===
Skip	Third	Second	Lead	Alternate
Brady Clark	Greg Persinger	Colin Hufman	Ken Trask	Doug Kauffman
Craig Brown	Matt Stevens	John Dunlop	Cody Stevens	Bob Liapis
Craig Disher	Kevin Kakela	Joel Jacobson	Carey Kakela	Zach Jacobson
Jason Larway	Doug Pottinger	Joel Larway	Bill Todhunter	
Pete Fenson	Shawn Rojeski	Joe Polo	John Shuster	
Scott Baird	Eric Fenson	Tim Johnson	Mark Haluptzok	
Greg Eigner	Jeremy Roe	Pat Roe	Ken Olson	Mark Hartman
Rich Ruohonen	Nick Myers	John Benton	Pete Annis	
Ben Tucker	Owen Sampson	Ned Sampson	Travis Kitchens	Bill Morehouse
Wes Johnson	Leon Romaniuk	Brandon Way	Mark Lazar	Quentin Way

=== Round robin standings ===
Key
Teams to playoffs

Team	W	L
Pete Fenson	7	2
Craig Brown	6	3
Scott Baird	6	3
Brady Clark	6	3
Rich Ruohonen	5	4
Craig Disher	5	4
Greg Eigner	3	6
Jason Larway	3	6
Ben Tucker	3	6
Wes Johnson	1	8

=== Round robin results ===
All times are listed in Central Standard Time.

==== Draw 1 ====
Saturday, February 19, 8:00 pm

Sheet 2	1	2	3	4	5	6	7	8	9	10	Final
Jason Larway	0	0	1	0	1	0	1	0	3	0	6
Ben Tucker	0	0	0	1	0	1	0	1	0	1	4

Sheet 3	1	2	3	4	5	6	7	8	9	10	Final
Brady Clark	0	1	3	1	0	1	0	0	1	X	7
Rich Ruohonen	0	0	0	0	1	0	0	1	0	X	2

Sheet 4	1	2	3	4	5	6	7	8	9	10	Final
Craig Disher	0	2	0	1	0	1	0	1	0	0	5
Scott Baird	1	0	1	0	1	0	2	0	1	1	7

Sheet 5	1	2	3	4	5	6	7	8	9	10	Final
Pete Fenson	1	0	0	0	2	1	0	2	1	X	7
Greg Eigner	0	0	1	0	0	0	1	0	0	X	2

Sheet 6	1	2	3	4	5	6	7	8	9	10	Final
Craig Brown	3	0	3	1	0	3	X	X	X	X	10
Wes Johnson	0	1	0	0	1	0	X	X	X	X	2

==== Draw 2 ====
Sunday, February 20, 2:00 pm

Sheet 2	1	2	3	4	5	6	7	8	9	10	Final
Scott Baird	2	0	0	1	1	0	0	0	1	0	5
Craig Brown	0	1	1	0	0	0	0	2	0	2	6

Sheet 3	1	2	3	4	5	6	7	8	9	10	Final
Wes Johnson	0	0	0	2	1	0	1	0	1	0	5
Jason Larway	1	0	1	0	0	1	0	0	0	0	3

Sheet 4	1	2	3	4	5	6	7	8	9	10	Final
Greg Eigner	1	0	3	0	1	0	0	0	2	0	7
Brady Clark	0	2	0	2	0	2	0	1	0	1	8

Sheet 5	1	2	3	4	5	6	7	8	9	10	Final
Rich Ruohonen	1	0	0	1	1	0	1	0	1	2	7
Craig Disher	0	0	1	0	0	3	0	1	0	0	5

Sheet 6	1	2	3	4	5	6	7	8	9	10	Final
Ben Tucker	0	0	3	0	0	1	0	2	1	0	7
Pete Fenson	1	2	0	1	0	0	3	0	0	1	8

==== Draw 3 ====
Monday, February 21, 8:00 am

Sheet 2	1	2	3	4	5	6	7	8	9	10	Final
Brady Clark	1	2	1	0	1	0	1	0	3	X	9
Craig Disher	0	0	0	1	0	1	0	1	0	X	3

Sheet 3	1	2	3	4	5	6	7	8	9	10	Final
Pete Fenson	0	1	1	1	0	2	0	0	1	1	7
Scott Baird	4	0	0	0	1	0	1	0	0	0	6

Sheet 4	1	2	3	4	5	6	7	8	9	10	Final
Craig Brown	1	3	1	0	0	2	0	4	X	X	11
Rich Ruohonen	0	0	0	2	0	0	1	0	X	X	3

Sheet 5	1	2	3	4	5	6	7	8	9	10	Final
Ben Tucker	0	3	0	4	0	2	1	0	2	X	12
Wes Johnson	3	0	1	0	3	0	0	1	0	X	8

Sheet 6	1	2	3	4	5	6	7	8	9	10	Final
Jason Larway	0	3	0	1	0	0	0	1	0	1	6
Greg Eigner	1	0	1	0	0	0	1	0	1	0	4

==== Draw 4 ====
Monday, February 21, 4:00 pm

Sheet 2	1	2	3	4	5	6	7	8	9	10	Final
Rich Ruohonen	0	0	0	3	0	7	X	X	X	X	10
Jason Larway	1	0	0	0	2	0	X	X	X	X	3

Sheet 3	1	2	3	4	5	6	7	8	9	10	Final
Greg Eigner	1	2	0	1	1	0	1	1	1	X	8
Ben Tucker	0	0	2	0	0	1	0	0	0	X	3

Sheet 4	1	2	3	4	5	6	7	8	9	10	Final
Wes Johnson	0	0	1	0	0	2	1	0	0	X	4
Pete Fenson	0	0	0	2	2	0	0	4	2	X	10

Sheet 5	1	2	3	4	5	6	7	8	9	10	Final
Scott Baird	0	0	3	0	2	0	2	0	1	X	8
Brady Clark	0	0	0	1	0	1	0	2	0	X	4

Sheet 6	1	2	3	4	5	6	7	8	9	10	Final
Craig Disher	1	0	0	0	0	1	1	0	1	3	7
Craig Brown	0	1	1	0	1	0	0	2	0	0	5

==== Draw 5 ====
Tuesday, February 22, 10:00 am

Sheet 2	1	2	3	4	5	6	7	8	9	10	11	Final
Craig Disher	1	0	3	0	1	0	1	0	3	0	1	10
Greg Eigner	0	2	0	2	0	1	0	2	0	2	0	9

Sheet 3	1	2	3	4	5	6	7	8	9	10	Final
Pete Fenson	0	0	2	0	1	1	0	3	3	X	10
Rich Ruohonen	0	0	0	2	0	0	2	0	0	X	4

Sheet 4	1	2	3	4	5	6	7	8	9	10	11	Final
Ben Tucker	0	1	0	0	3	0	3	1	0	0	0	8
Scott Baird	0	0	0	3	0	3	0	0	1	1	1	9

Sheet 5	1	2	3	4	5	6	7	8	9	10	Final
Craig Brown	2	0	0	1	1	0	3	0	X	X	7
Jason Larway	0	0	0	0	0	1	0	1	X	X	2

Sheet 6	1	2	3	4	5	6	7	8	9	10	Final
Brady Clark	0	1	0	0	1	0	2	1	1	2	8
Wes Johnson	1	0	1	0	0	3	0	0	0	0	5

==== Draw 6 ====
Tuesday, February 22, 7:00 pm

Sheet 2	1	2	3	4	5	6	7	8	9	10	Final
Scott Baird	0	2	0	0	3	0	3	1	0	X	9
Wes Johnson	0	0	0	2	0	2	0	0	1	X	5

Sheet 3	1	2	3	4	5	6	7	8	9	10	Final
Ben Tucker	2	1	1	0	0	1	0	1	0	1	7
Craig Brown	0	0	0	2	1	0	1	0	1	0	5

Sheet 4	1	2	3	4	5	6	7	8	9	10	Final
Jason Larway	0	2	0	0	2	0	1	0	X	X	5
Craig Disher	1	0	2	2	0	1	0	4	X	X	10

Sheet 5	1	2	3	4	5	6	7	8	9	10	Final
Pete Fenson	2	0	1	4	0	1	0	3	X	X	11
Brady Clark	0	1	0	0	2	0	0	0	X	X	3

Sheet 6	1	2	3	4	5	6	7	8	9	10	Final
Rich Ruohonen	1	0	1	1	1	0	1	0	2	X	7
Greg Eigner	0	1	0	0	0	1	0	1	0	X	3

==== Draw 7 ====
Wednesday, February 23, 12:00 pm

Sheet 2	1	2	3	4	5	6	7	8	9	10	Final
Brady Clark	2	0	1	0	2	1	2	X	X	X	8
Ben Tucker	0	0	0	1	0	0	0	X	X	X	1

Sheet 3	1	2	3	4	5	6	7	8	9	10	Final
Scott Baird	3	0	3	1	0	3	0	4	X	X	14
Jason Larway	0	2	0	0	2	0	2	0	X	X	6

Sheet 4	1	2	3	4	5	6	7	8	9	10	Final
Greg Eigner	0	0	1	1	0	1	0	1	1	0	5
Craig Brown	0	1	0	0	3	0	1	0	0	1	6

Sheet 5	1	2	3	4	5	6	7	8	9	10	Final
Wes Johnson	1	0	0	2	0	2	0	0	0	0	5
Rich Ruohonen	0	0	1	0	3	0	2	1	0	0	7

Sheet 6	1	2	3	4	5	6	7	8	9	10	Final
Craig Disher	1	1	0	0	0	3	0	0	1	X	6
Pete Fenson	0	0	3	0	2	0	1	3	0	X	9

==== Draw 8 ====
Wednesday, February 23, 8:00 pm

Sheet 2	1	2	3	4	5	6	7	8	9	10	Final
Craig Brown	1	0	0	0	2	0	0	2	0	3	8
Pete Fenson	0	0	2	0	0	1	1	0	1	0	5

Sheet 3	1	2	3	4	5	6	7	8	9	10	Final
Wes Johnson	1	0	2	0	0	2	1	0	2	1	9
Craig Disher	0	4	0	3	1	0	0	2	0	0	10

Sheet 4	1	2	3	4	5	6	7	8	9	10	Final
Rich Ruohonen	1	1	0	1	0	2	0	0	0	0	5
Ben Tucker	0	0	0	0	1	0	0	1	1	0	3

Sheet 5	1	2	3	4	5	6	7	8	9	10	Final
Greg Eigner	0	2	0	2	2	2	X	X	X	X	8
Scott Baird	0	0	1	0	0	0	X	X	X	X	1

Sheet 6	1	2	3	4	5	6	7	8	9	10	Final
Jason Larway	2	0	1	0	0	2	0	2	0	1	8
Brady Clark	0	2	0	0	1	0	1	0	2	0	6

==== Draw 9 ====
Thursday, February 24, 12:00 pm

Sheet 2	1	2	3	4	5	6	7	8	9	10	Final
Wes Johnson	0	1	0	1	0	0	X	X	X	X	2
Greg Eigner	1	0	3	0	1	1	X	X	X	X	6

Sheet 3	1	2	3	4	5	6	7	8	9	10	Final
Craig Brown	0	0	2	0	0	0	1	0	1	0	4
Brady Clark	0	2	0	3	0	0	0	2	0	3	10

Sheet 4	1	2	3	4	5	6	7	8	9	10	Final
Pete Fenson	0	0	1	0	1	0	2	1	1	0	6
Jason Larway	0	0	0	2	0	1	0	0	0	1	4

Sheet 5	1	2	3	4	5	6	7	8	9	10	Final
Craig Disher	2	0	0	1	0	2	2	1	1	X	9
Ben Tucker	0	0	1	0	1	0	0	0	0	X	2

Sheet 6	1	2	3	4	5	6	7	8	9	10	Final
Scott Baird	0	2	0	0	0	1	0	2	0	1	6
Rich Ruohonen	0	0	1	0	1	0	1	0	1	0	4

=== Tiebreakers ===
Thursday, February 24, 4:00 pm

Sheet 5	1	2	3	4	5	6	7	8	9	10	Final
Craig Brown	1	0	4	1	0	3	X	X	X	X	9
Brady Clark	0	1	0	0	1	0	X	X	X	X	2

Thursday, February 24, 8:00 pm

Sheet 5	1	2	3	4	5	6	7	8	9	10	11	Final
Craig Brown	0	3	0	0	0	2	0	1	2	0	3	11
Scott Baird	2	0	1	0	1	0	2	0	0	2	0	8

=== Playoffs ===
Page playoff system
1	Pete Fenson	9
2	Craig Brown	3
3	Scott Baird	4
4	Brady Clark	5

Semifinal
2	Craig Brown	7
4	Brady Clark	6

Final
1	Pete Fenson	7
2	Craig Brown	3

==== 1 vs. 2 ====
Friday, February 25, 2:00 pm

Sheet 5	1	2	3	4	5	6	7	8	9	10	Final
Pete Fenson	0	0	0	2	0	1	1	0	1	4	9
Craig Brown	0	0	0	0	1	0	0	2	0	0	3

==== 3 vs. 4 ====
Friday, February 25, 2:00 pm

Sheet 2	1	2	3	4	5	6	7	8	9	10	Final
Scott Baird	0	1	0	1	0	1	0	1	0	0	4
Brady Clark	0	0	1	0	1	0	1	0	0	2	5

==== Semifinal ====
Friday, February 25, 7:00 pm

Sheet 3	1	2	3	4	5	6	7	8	9	10	Final
Craig Brown	2	0	0	2	0	0	1	1	0	1	7
Brady Clark	0	0	2	0	2	1	0	0	1	0	6

==== Final ====
Saturday, February 26, 2:00 pm

Sheet 4	1	2	3	4	5	6	7	8	9	10	Final
Pete Fenson	0	1	0	0	1	1	0	3	0	1	7
Craig Brown	0	0	0	1	0	0	1	0	1	0	3

== Women ==
=== Teams ===
Skip	Third	Second	Lead	Alternate
Nancy Richard	Doreen Deaver	Leslie Frosch	Miyo Konno	
Caitlin Maroldo	Chrissy Fink-Haase	Elizabeth Williams	Erlene Puleo	Katie Beck
Cassandra Johnson	Jamie Johnson	Jessica Schultz	Maureen Brunt	
Debbie McCormick	Allison Pottinger	Ann Swisshelm Silver	Tracy Sachtjen	
Amy Wright	Cristin Clark	Stephanie Roland	Lisa Rugen	
Patti Lank	Erika Brown	Nicole Joraanstad	Natalie Nicholson	
Katlyn Schmitt	Sarah Schmitt	Monica Matson	Sarah Lehman	Katie Goodyear
Norma O'Leary	Becky Dobie	Theresa Faltesek	Patti Luke	Anne Robb
Lori Karst	Stephanie Radl	Shelly Pape	Laurie Walters	
Aileen Sormunen	Courtney George	Amanda Jensen	Amanda McLean	

=== Round robin standings ===
Key
Teams to playoffs
Teams to tiebreakers

Team	W	L
Cassandra Johnson	9	0
Debbie McCormick	8	1
Patti Lank	7	2
Aileen Sormunen	5	4
Amy Wright	5	4
Norma O'Leary	4	5
Caitlin Maroldo	3	6
Lori Karst	2	7
Nancy Richard	1	8
Katie Schmitt	1	8

=== Round robin results ===
All times are listed in Central Standard Time.

==== Draw 1 ====
Saturday, February 19, 4:00 pm

Sheet 2	1	2	3	4	5	6	7	8	9	10	Final
Debbie McCormick	2	0	2	0	0	1	1	0	0	1	7
Lori Karst	0	1	0	2	0	0	0	1	1	0	5

Sheet 3	1	2	3	4	5	6	7	8	9	10	Final
Caitlin Maroldo	0	0	0	0	1	0	0	0	X	X	1
Aileen Sormunen	2	1	1	0	0	1	1	2	X	X	8

Sheet 4	1	2	3	4	5	6	7	8	9	10	Final
Amy Wright	1	0	0	1	1	0	2	0	1	0	6
Katie Schmitt	0	0	1	0	0	1	0	2	0	1	5

Sheet 5	1	2	3	4	5	6	7	8	9	10	Final
Patti Lank	0	2	0	2	0	2	1	0	0	1	8
Nancy Richard	1	0	2	0	1	0	0	0	2	0	6

Sheet 6	1	2	3	4	5	6	7	8	9	10	Final
Cassandra Johnson	0	3	0	1	0	2	0	0	1	1	8
Norma O'Leary	0	0	1	0	1	0	1	1	0	0	4

==== Draw 2 ====
Sunday, February 20, 10:00 am

Sheet 2	1	2	3	4	5	6	7	8	9	10	Final
Katie Schmitt	1	0	0	0	0	1	0	X	X	X	2
Cassandra Johnson	0	1	3	1	1	0	2	X	X	X	8

Sheet 3	1	2	3	4	5	6	7	8	9	10	Final
Norma O'Leary	0	2	0	0	0	1	0	1	1	X	5
Debbie McCormick	3	0	0	2	0	0	2	0	0	X	7

Sheet 4	1	2	3	4	5	6	7	8	9	10	Final
Nancy Richard	0	0	1	0	0	0	0	0	X	X	1
Caitlin Maroldo	0	1	0	4	1	0	0	1	X	X	7

Sheet 5	1	2	3	4	5	6	7	8	9	10	Final
Aileen Sormunen	0	2	3	0	1	1	0	1	0	0	8
Amy Wright	0	0	0	2	0	0	2	0	2	1	7

Sheet 6	1	2	3	4	5	6	7	8	9	10	Final
Lori Karst	1	0	0	0	1	0	0	0	1	0	3
Patti Lank	0	0	2	1	0	0	1	1	0	1	6

==== Draw 3 ====
Sunday, February 20, 7:00 pm

Sheet 2	1	2	3	4	5	6	7	8	9	10	Final
Caitlin Maroldo	0	3	1	0	0	1	1	0	0	1	7
Amy Wright	1	0	0	1	2	0	0	2	3	0	9

Sheet 3	1	2	3	4	5	6	7	8	9	10	Final
Patti Lank	2	0	2	0	1	1	0	3	0	0	9
Katie Schmitt	0	1	0	2	0	0	1	0	2	1	7

Sheet 4	1	2	3	4	5	6	7	8	9	10	Final
Cassandra Johnson	1	1	0	0	0	3	0	2	0	0	7
Aileen Sormunen	0	0	2	1	1	0	1	0	1	0	6

Sheet 5	1	2	3	4	5	6	7	8	9	10	Final
Lori Karst	1	0	0	1	0	0	1	X	X	X	3
Norma O'Leary	0	2	4	0	1	1	0	X	X	X	8

Sheet 6	1	2	3	4	5	6	7	8	9	10	Final
Debbie McCormick	2	0	4	0	1	0	2	0	3	X	12
Nancy Richard	0	1	0	1	0	2	0	1	0	X	5

==== Draw 4 ====
Monday, February 21, 12:00 pm

Sheet 2	1	2	3	4	5	6	7	8	9	10	Final
Aileen Sormunen	1	0	1	0	0	1	0	0	2	1	6
Debbie McCormick	0	2	0	2	1	0	2	1	0	0	8

Sheet 3	1	2	3	4	5	6	7	8	9	10	Final
Nancy Richard	2	0	4	1	1	0	4	X	X	X	12
Lori Karst	0	1	0	0	0	3	0	X	X	X	4

Sheet 4	1	2	3	4	5	6	7	8	9	10	Final
Norma O'Leary	0	0	0	2	1	0	1	0	2	0	6
Patti Lank	0	1	2	0	0	3	0	2	0	0	8

Sheet 5	1	2	3	4	5	6	7	8	9	10	11	Final
Katie Schmitt	0	0	1	0	1	0	0	1	0	2	0	5
Caitlin Maroldo	1	0	0	1	0	1	1	0	1	0	1	6

Sheet 6	1	2	3	4	5	6	7	8	9	10	Final
Amy Wright	0	0	1	0	2	0	0	1	0	X	4
Cassandra Johnson	1	0	0	2	0	1	3	0	2	X	9

==== Draw 5 ====
Monday, February 21, 8:00 pm

Sheet 2	1	2	3	4	5	6	7	8	9	10	Final
Amy Wright	1	0	4	0	2	0	0	0	1	2	10
Nancy Richard	0	1	0	2	0	0	1	1	0	0	5

Sheet 3	1	2	3	4	5	6	7	8	9	10	11	Final
Patti Lank	2	0	0	1	0	1	0	3	0	0	1	8
Aileen Sormunen	0	0	1	0	1	0	2	0	1	2	0	7

Sheet 4	1	2	3	4	5	6	7	8	9	10	Final
Lori Karst	0	2	1	4	0	1	0	1	X	X	9
Katie Schmitt	0	0	0	0	1	0	1	0	X	X	2

Sheet 5	1	2	3	4	5	6	7	8	9	10	11	Final
Cassandra Johnson	0	0	2	0	0	1	0	2	0	0	2	7
Debbie McCormick	1	1	0	1	0	0	1	0	0	1	0	5

Sheet 6	1	2	3	4	5	6	7	8	9	10	Final
Caitlin Maroldo	2	0	0	0	0	1	0	2	2	0	7
Norma O'Leary	0	0	0	0	1	0	2	0	0	1	4

==== Draw 6 ====
Tuesday, February 22, 2:00 pm

Sheet 2	1	2	3	4	5	6	7	8	9	10	11	Final
Katie Schmitt	0	0	1	0	0	1	0	1	0	1	0	4
Norma O'Leary	0	1	0	0	0	0	1	0	2	0	1	5

Sheet 3	1	2	3	4	5	6	7	8	9	10	Final
Lori Karst	1	0	1	0	1	0	0	0	2	0	5
Cassandra Johnson	0	2	0	1	0	0	1	1	0	1	6

Sheet 4	1	2	3	4	5	6	7	8	9	10	Final
Debbie McCormick	2	0	1	1	1	0	1	0	0	1	7
Amy Wright	0	1	0	0	0	1	0	1	2	0	5

Sheet 5	1	2	3	4	5	6	7	8	9	10	Final
Patti Lank	3	0	0	3	1	1	0	2	X	X	10
Caitlin Maroldo	0	1	0	0	0	0	1	0	X	X	2

Sheet 6	1	2	3	4	5	6	7	8	9	10	11	Final
Aileen Sormunen	0	0	1	0	2	0	0	2	0	0	1	6
Nancy Richard	0	0	0	1	0	1	1	0	1	1	0	5

==== Draw 7 ====
Wednesday, February 23, 8:00 am

Sheet 2	1	2	3	4	5	6	7	8	9	10	Final
Caitlin Maroldo	1	0	1	0	0	1	0	2	1	0	6
Lori Karst	0	1	0	2	2	0	1	0	0	1	7

Sheet 3	1	2	3	4	5	6	7	8	9	10	Final
Katie Schmitt	0	1	0	1	0	3	0	0	X	X	5
Debbie McCormick	1	0	4	0	3	0	4	2	X	X	14

Sheet 4	1	2	3	4	5	6	7	8	9	10	Final
Nancy Richard	0	0	1	0	0	0	2	2	2	0	7
Cassandra Johnson	1	1	0	1	0	2	0	0	0	3	8

Sheet 5	1	2	3	4	5	6	7	8	9	10	Final
Norma O'Leary	0	4	2	0	0	0	3	1	0	X	10
Aileen Sormunen	1	0	0	4	1	1	0	0	2	X	9

Sheet 6	1	2	3	4	5	6	7	8	9	10	Final
Amy Wright	0	0	1	0	1	0	1	0	2	X	5
Patti Lank	1	1	0	1	0	2	0	2	0	X	7

==== Draw 8 ====
Wednesday, February 23, 4:00 pm

Sheet 2	1	2	3	4	5	6	7	8	9	10	Final
Cassandra Johnson	2	0	0	0	2	1	0	0	2	0	7
Patti Lank	0	0	1	0	0	0	1	2	0	0	4

Sheet 3	1	2	3	4	5	6	7	8	9	10	11	12	Final
Norma O'Leary	1	0	0	2	0	1	1	0	1	1	0	0	7
Amy Wright	0	0	4	0	1	0	0	2	0	0	0	1	8

Sheet 4	1	2	3	4	5	6	7	8	9	10	Final
Aileen Sormunen	0	1	0	1	1	1	0	0	0	1	5
Lori Karst	1	0	2	0	0	0	0	1	0	0	4

Sheet 5	1	2	3	4	5	6	7	8	9	10	11	Final
Nancy Richard	0	0	0	2	0	0	3	0	0	0	0	5
Katie Schmitt	0	0	0	0	1	0	0	1	1	2	1	6

Sheet 6	1	2	3	4	5	6	7	8	9	10	Final
Debbie McCormick	2	0	0	3	2	0	1	0	X	X	8
Caitlin Maroldo	0	0	1	0	0	1	0	1	X	X	3

==== Draw 9 ====
Thursday, February 24, 8:00 am

Sheet 2	1	2	3	4	5	6	7	8	9	10	Final
Norma O'Leary	0	1	0	1	2	1	1	X	X	X	6
Nancy Richard	0	0	1	0	0	0	0	X	X	X	1

Sheet 3	1	2	3	4	5	6	7	8	9	10	Final
Cassandra Johnson	0	4	2	1	1	2	X	X	X	X	10
Caitlin Maroldo	0	0	0	0	0	0	X	X	X	X	0

Sheet 4	1	2	3	4	5	6	7	8	9	10	11	Final
Patti Lank	0	2	2	0	0	2	0	0	0	0	0	6
Debbie McCormick	1	0	0	1	1	0	0	0	2	1	1	7

Sheet 5	1	2	3	4	5	6	7	8	9	10	Final
Amy Wright	0	1	1	2	3	0	1	0	1	X	9
Lori Karst	1	0	0	0	0	2	0	1	0	X	4

Sheet 6	1	2	3	4	5	6	7	8	9	10	Final
Katie Schmitt	0	1	0	0	0	1	0	2	0	1	5
Aileen Sormunen	1	0	1	1	0	0	5	0	1	0	9

=== Tiebreaker ===
Thursday, February 24, 4:00 pm

Sheet 3	1	2	3	4	5	6	7	8	9	10	Final
Aileen Sormunen	0	0	2	0	5	0	4	0	0	2	13
Amy Wright	1	1	0	3	0	1	0	2	2	0	10

=== Playoffs ===
Page playoff system
1	Cassandra Johnson	6
2	Debbie McCormick	8
3	Patti Lank	9
4	Aileen Sormunen	4

Semifinal
1	Cassandra Johnson	8
3	Patti Lank	7

Final
2	Debbie McCormick	4
1	Cassandra Johnson	5

==== 1 vs. 2 ====
Friday, February 25, 2:00 pm

Sheet 3	1	2	3	4	5	6	7	8	9	10	Final
Cassandra Johnson	1	0	0	2	0	1	0	1	0	1	6
Debbie McCormick	0	1	2	0	2	0	1	0	2	0	8

==== 3 vs. 4 ====
Friday, February 25, 2:00 pm

Sheet 6	1	2	3	4	5	6	7	8	9	10	Final
Patti Lank	1	1	0	0	2	1	0	1	2	1	9
Aileen Sormunen	0	0	0	2	0	0	2	0	0	0	4

==== Semifinal ====
Friday, February 25, 7:00 pm

Sheet 5	1	2	3	4	5	6	7	8	9	10	11	Final
Cassandra Johnson	1	0	0	1	2	0	2	0	1	0	1	8
Patti Lank	0	2	0	0	0	1	0	2	0	2	0	7

==== Final ====
Saturday, February 26, 10:00 am

Sheet 4	1	2	3	4	5	6	7	8	9	10	11	Final
Debbie McCormick	0	0	1	0	0	1	0	0	1	1	0	4
Cassandra Johnson	0	0	0	2	0	0	0	2	0	0	1	5
