= Zach Jacobson =

American curler

- Curler ♂
- Born: December 12, 1984 (age 41); Langdon, North Dakota, United States

Team
- Curling club: Langdon CC, Langdon, ND

Curling career
- Member Association: (North Dakota) Dakota Territory
- World Championship: 1 (2007)
Medal record
Curling
World Championships
Bronze medal – third place	2007 Edmonton
United States Men's Championship
Silver medal – second place	2006 Bemidji
Silver medal – second place	2007 Utica
Silver medal – second place	2008 Utica
Bronze medal – third place	2003 Utica
Bronze medal – third place	2012 Philadelphia

Zach Jacobson (born December 12, 1984, in Langdon, North Dakota, United States) is an American curler.

He is a 2007 World Men's bronze medallist.

== Teams ==
Season	Skip	Third	Second	Lead	Alternate	Coach	Events
1998–99	Brent Burns	Zach Jacobson	Joe Jaster	Zane Jacobson		Joel Jacobson	1999 USJCC (9th)
1999–00	Zach Jacobson	Tom O'Connor	Joe Jaster	Zane Jacobson		Joel Jacobson	2000 USJCC (SF)
2002–03	Zach Jacobson	Matt Mielke	Zach Jacobson	Tucker Smith		Jon Mielke; Joel Jacobson	2003 USJCC
2002–03	Craig Disher	Kevin Kakela	Zach Jacobson	Joel Jacobson	Carey Kakela		2003 USMCC (4th)
2003–04	Zach Jacobson	Joe Polo	Jeff Thune	Zane Jacobson		Joel Jacobson	2004 USJCC (silver)
2003–04	Craig Disher	Kevin Kakela	Zach Jacobson	Carey Kakela	Joel Jacobson		2004 USMCC (5th)
2004–05	Zach Jacobson	Jeff Thune	Zane Jacobson	Tucker Smith		Joel Jacobson	2005 USJCC (SF)
2004–05	Craig Disher	Kevin Kakela	Joel Jacobson	Carey Kakela	Zach Jacobson		2005 USMCC/USOCT (5th)
2005–06	Zach Jacobson	Jeff Thune	Ryan Brunt	Zane Jacobson			2006 USMCC (silver)
2006–07	Craig Disher	Kevin Kakela	Zach Jacobson	Carey Kakela	Joel Jacobson		2007 USMCC (silver)
2006–07	Todd Birr	Bill Todhunter	Greg Johnson	Kevin Birr	Zach Jacobson	Paul Pustovar	2007 WMCC (bronze)
2007–08	Craig Disher	Kevin Kakela	Zach Jacobson	Carey Kakela	Kurt Disher	Joel Jacobson	2008 USMCC (silver)
2008–09	Craig Disher	Kevin Kakela	Zach Jacobson	Carey Kakela	Kurt Disher		2009 USMCC/USOCT (8th)
2009–10	Craig Brown	Rich Ruohonen	Zach Jacobson	Pete Annis			2010 USMCC (5th)
2010–11	Zach Jacobson	Kevin Deeren	Zane Jacobson	Kraig Deeren	Mike Farbelow		2011 USMCC (6th)
2011–12	John Shuster	Zach Jacobson	Jared Zezel	John Landsteiner			2012 USMCC (bronze)

== Private life ==
Zach Jacobson resides in Langdon, North Dakota.

He graduated North Dakota State University.

His father is a curler Joel Jacobson. Zach's brother Zane is also a curler.
