= Tim Johnson (curler) =

American curler

- Curler ♂
- Born: October 18, 1953 (age 73); Hallock, Minnesota, U.S.

Team
- Curling club: Bemidji CC, Bemidji, MN

Curling career
- Member Association: United States
- World Championship: 2 (1993, 1994)
Medal record
Curling
World Championships
Bronze medal – third place	1993 Geneva
United States Men's Championship
Gold medal – first place	1993 St. Paul
Gold medal – first place	1994 Duluth

Tim Johnson (born October 18, 1953) is an American curler from Bemidji, Minnesota.

He is a 1993 World Men's bronze medalist.

== Personal life ==
Johnson has two daughters, Jamie and Cassie, who are successful curlers themselves, having won the silver medal at the 2005 World Women's Curling Championship and competed at the 2006 Winter Olympics.

== Teams ==
=== Men's ===
Season	Skip	Third	Second	Lead	Alternate	Events
1992–93	Scott Baird	Pete Fenson	Mark Haluptzok	Tim Johnson	Dan Haluptzok	USMCC 1993 (gold); WCC 1993 (bronze)
1993–94	Scott Baird	Pete Fenson	Mark Haluptzok	Tim Johnson	Dan Haluptzok	USMCC 1994 (gold); WCC 1994 (5th)
1996–97	Don Barcome Jr.	Mark Haluptzok	Tim Johnson	Earl Barcome		
1999–00	Don Barcome Jr.	Mark Haluptzok	Tim Kreklau	Tim Johnson	Randy Darling	USMCC 2000 (SF)
2000–01	Don Barcome Jr.	Mark Haluptzok	Tim Kreklau	Randy Darling	Tim Johnson	USMCC 2001 (8th)
2004–05	Scott Baird	Eric Fenson	Tim Johnson	Mark Haluptzok		USMCC 2005 (SF)
2014–15	Kent Bahr	Steven Johnson	Tim Johnson	Terry Matson		USSCC 2015 (16th)

=== Mixed ===
Season	Skip	Third	Second	Lead	Events
1980	Mark Haluptzok	Liz Johnson	Tim Johnson	Mary Jo Roufs	USMxCC 1980 (gold)
1982	Mark Haluptzok	Liz Johnson	Tim Johnson	Mary Jo Roufs	USMxCC 1982 (gold)
1992	Andy Borland	Liz Johnson	Tim Johnson	Jean Borland	USMxCC 1992 (gold)
1994	Andy Borland	Liz Johnson	Tim Johnson	Jean Borland	USMxCC 1994 (gold)
