= Rich Ruohonen =

American curler (born 1971)

- Curler
- Other names: Richard Ruohonen
- Born: March 31, 1971 (age 55); Saint Paul, Minnesota, U.S.

Team
- Curling club: St. Paul CC, St. Paul, MN
- Skip: Daniel Casper
- Third: Luc Violette
- Second: Ben Richardson
- Lead: Aidan Oldenburg
- Alternate: Rich Ruohonen

Curling career
- Member Association: United States
- World Championship: 2 (2008, 2018)
- Pan Continental Championship: 1 (2022)
- Olympic: 1 (2026)
- Other appearances: World Senior Curling Championships: 3 (2024, 2025, 2026)
Medal record
Curling
Representing United States
Pan Continental Curling Championships
Bronze medal – third place	2022 Calgary
World Senior Curling Championships
Gold medal – first place	2026 Geneva
Silver medal – second place	2024 Östersund
Bronze medal – third place	2025 Fredericton
Representing Minnesota
US Olympic Trials
Gold medal – first place	2025 Sioux Falls
Silver medal – second place	2017 Omaha
United States Men's Curling Championship
Gold medal – first place	2008 Hibbing
Gold medal – first place	2018 Fargo
Silver medal – second place	2011 Fargo
Silver medal – second place	2013 Green Bay
Silver medal – second place	2017 Everett
Silver medal – second place	2019 Kalamazoo
Silver medal – second place	2020 Cheney
Silver medal – second place	2025 Duluth
Bronze medal – third place	2014 Philadelphia

Richard Ruohonen (/ˈruːənɪn/ ROO-ə-nin; born March 31, 1971) is an American curler from Brooklyn Park, Minnesota. He is a two-time national champion and as such represented the United States at the 2008 and 2018 World Men's Curling Championships.

== Career ==
Ruohonen made his first appearance at the United States Men's Championship in 1998. He won his first national championship in 2008, playing third for skip Craig Brown. As Team United States at the 2008 World Men's Championship, they finished the round-robin with 5–6 record, missing the playoffs and ending the tournament in seventh place.

Ruohonen would lose the US Nationals final three times, in 2011, 2013, and 2017, before again earning the gold medal in 2018. His 2018 gold medal team included Greg Persinger, Colin Hufman, and Philip Tilker. At the World Championship they finished in sixth place when they lost their first playoff game to Brad Gushue's Team Canada.

In 2019 when Ruohonen returned to the national championship to attempt to defend his title, he brought along Jared Allen, retired NFL player, as an alternate. Ruohonen's team lost to John Shuster in the final, with a score of 8–4.

At the 2020 United States Men's Championship Ruohonen made it to the finals for the fourth year in a row, facing John Shuster for the third time out of those four years and, as happened in 2017 and 2019, Shuster prevailed to win the championship.

Ruohonen would later notably join the Daniel Casper rink as an alternate for the 2025–26 curling season, where they would qualify for the 2025 United States Olympic Curling Trials. At the Trials, Team Casper would go 4–2 in the round robin and beat the rink led by 2018 Olympic Champion and 5-time Olympian John Shuster in the best-of-three final series, winning the deciding Game 3 by a score of 7–5 after the two sides split the first two games. This win qualified the Casper rink to represent the United States at the 2025 Olympic Qualification Event. The team would go on to win the Qualification Event, finishing 6–1 after round robin play and beating China's Xu Xiaoming 9–4, qualifying for the 2026 Winter Olympics.

Ruohonen made his Olympic debut on February 12, 2026, substituting in for the eighth end of the United States's 8–3 loss to Switzerland in Round Robin play. He is the oldest person to play for the United States in the Winter Olympics.

== Personal life ==
Ruohonen is an American personal injury lawyer and a partner at the TSR Injury Law firm. He attended the Hamline University School of Law. In 2001 he was fellow curler Jason Larway's attorney when they filed a grievance with the United States Olympic Committee and the United States Curling Association over Larway's eligibility to compete at the 2001 United States Olympic Curling Trials.

He is married to Sherry, with two children. He started curling in 1981.

== Teams ==
Season	Skip	Third	Second	Lead	Alternate	Coach	Events
2003–04	Rich Ruohonen	Jeff Laundergan	John Benton	Pete Annis			2004 USMCC (9th)
2004–05	Rich Ruohonen	Nick Myers	John Benton	Pete Annis		Jim Dexter	2005 USMCC/USOCT (5th)
2005–06	Rich Ruohonen	Nick Myers	John Benton	Pete Annis			2006 US World Trials (5th)
2006–07	Rich Ruohonen	Troy Schroeder	John Benton	Pete Annis			2007 USMCC (8th)
2007–08	Craig Brown	Rich Ruohonen	John Dunlop	Pete Annis	Kevin Kakela (WMCC)	Steve Brown	2008 USMCC (gold); 2008 WMCC (7th)
2008–09	Craig Brown	Rich Ruohonen	John Dunlop	Pete Annis			2009 USMCC/USOCT (4th)
2009–10	Craig Brown	Rich Ruohonen	Zach Jacobson	Pete Annis			2010 USMCC (5th)
2010–11	Tyler George	Chris Plys	Rich Ruohonen	Phill Drobnick			2011 USMCC (silver)
2011–12	Tyler George	Chris Plys	Rich Ruohonen	Colin Hufman			2012 USMCC (8th)
2012–13	Chris Plys (fourth)	Tyler George (skip)	Rich Ruohonen	Colin Hufman			2013 USMCC (silver)
2013–14	Chris Plys (fourth)	Tyler George (skip)	Rich Ruohonen	Colin Hufman	Craig Brown		2013 USOCT (4th)
2013–14	Heath McCormick	Chris Plys	Rich Ruohonen	Colin Hufman			2014 USMCC (bronze)
2014–15	Mike Farbelow	Rich Ruohonen	Kevin Johnson	Dan Ruehl			
2015–16	Mike Farbelow	Rich Ruohonen	Chris Bond	Dan Ruehl			
2016–17	Todd Birr	Rich Ruohonen	John Benton	Tom O'Connor			2017 USMCC (silver)
2017–18	Heath McCormick	Chris Plys	Korey Dropkin	Tom Howell	Rich Ruohonen		2017 USOCT (2nd)
2017–18	Greg Persinger (fourth)	Rich Ruohonen (skip)	Colin Hufman	Philip Tilker	Chris Plys (WMCC)	Phill Drobnick	2018 USMCC (gold); 2018 WMCC (6th)
2018–19	Greg Persinger (fourth)	Rich Ruohonen (skip)	Colin Hufman	Philip Tilker	Jared Allen		2019 USMCC (silver)
2018–19	Greg Persinger (fourth)	Rich Ruohonen (skip)	Sean Beighton	Kroy Nernberger		Phill Drobnick	CWC/1 (6th)
2019–20	Rich Ruohonen	Greg Persinger	Colin Hufman	Philip Tilker	Kroy Nernberger		2020 USMCC (silver)
2020–21	Rich Ruohonen	Andrew Stopera	Colin Hufman	Philip Tilker	Kroy Nernberger		2021 USMCC (7th)
2021–22	Rich Ruohonen	Andrew Stopera	Colin Hufman	Kroy Nernberger	Philip Tilker		
2021–22	Korey Dropkin	Andrea Stopera	Mark Fenner	Tom Howell	Rich Ruohonen	Mark Lazar	2022 PCCC (bronze)
2023–24	Rich Ruohenen	Jason Smith	Samuel Strouse	Jared Allen	Aidan Oldenburg		2024 USMCC (8th)
2024–25	Daniel Casper	Luc Violette	Ben Richardson	Aidan Oldenburg	Rich Ruohonen		2025 USMCC (silver)
2025–26	Daniel Casper	Luc Violette	Ben Richardson	Aidan Oldenburg	Rich Ruohonen		

== Grand Slam record ==
Key
C	Champion
F	Lost in Final
SF	Lost in Semifinal
QF	Lost in Quarterfinals
R16	Lost in the round of 16
Q	Did not advance to playoffs
T2	Played in Tier 2 event
DNP	Did not participate in event
N/A	Not a Grand Slam event that season

Event	2008–09	2009–10	2010–11	2011–12	2012–13	2013–14	2014–15	2015–16	2016–17	2017–18	2018–19	2019–20	2020–21	2021–22	2022–23	2023–24	2024–25
Tour Challenge	N/A	N/A	N/A	N/A	N/A	N/A	N/A	DNP	DNP	DNP	QF	T2	N/A	N/A	DNP	DNP	T2 (Note: Ruohonen spared for Daniel Casper.)
Masters	Q	DNP	DNP	DNP	DNP	Q	DNP	DNP	DNP	DNP	DNP	DNP	N/A	Q	DNP	DNP	DNP
Champions Cup	N/A	N/A	N/A	N/A	N/A	N/A	N/A	DNP	DNP	QF	DNP	N/A	DNP	DNP	DNP	N/A	N/A
