= Doug Pottinger =

Canadian-American curler

- Curler
- Born: September 18, 1973 (age 53); Brandon, Manitoba, Canada

Team
- Curling club: St Paul CC, Minnesota

Curling career
- Member Association: Manitoba (1992-1993); Wisconsin (1999-2003); Washington (2003-2005; 2008-2009); Minnesota (2005-2007; 2009-present)
- World Championship: 1 (2004)
Medal record
Curling
US Men's Championship
| Gold medal – first place | 2004 Grand Forks |
| Bronze medal – third place | 2011 Fargo |
US Mixed Doubles Championship
| Silver medal – second place | 2016 Denver |

Doug Pottinger (born September 18, 1973) is a Canadian-American curler from Eden Prairie, Minnesota. He is originally from Brandon, Manitoba, Canada.

At the national level, he is a 2004 United States men's curling champion.

== Teams ==
=== Men's ===
| Season | Skip | Third | Second | Lead | Alternate | Coach | Events |
|---|---|---|---|---|---|---|---|
| 1992–93 | Mike Mansell | Doug Pottinger | Jason Fuchs | Keith Marshall | | | CJCC 1993 (9th) |
| 1999–00 | Doug Pottinger | Troy Schroeder | Greg Johnson | Bill Todhunter | Kurt Johnson | | USMCC 2000 (DNQ) |
| 2001–02 | Doug Pottinger | Troy Schroeder | Greg Johnson | Bill Todhunter | Nate Gebert | | USOCT 2001 (5th) |
| 2001–02 | Craig Brown | Doug Pottinger | Jon Brunt | John Dunlop | Cory Ward | Steve Brown | USMCC 2002 (3rd) |
| 2002–03 | Craig Brown | Doug Pottinger | Jon Brunt | John Dunlop | | | |
| 2003–04 | Pete Fenson | Doug Pottinger | Shawn Rojeski | Keith Marshall | | | |
| 2003–04 | Jason Larway | Doug Pottinger | Joel Larway | Bill Todhunter | Doug Kauffman | Don Pottinger | USMCC 2004 (gold); WCC 2004 (9th) |
| 2004–05 | Jason Larway | Doug Pottinger | Joel Larway | Bill Todhunter | | | CCC 2004 (gold); USOCT 2005 (7th) |
| 2005–06 | Todd Birr | Doug Pottinger | Pete Westberg | Kevin Birr | | | USMCC 2006 (4th) |
| 2006–07 | Pete Fenson | Shawn Rojeski | Joe Polo | Doug Pottinger | | | CCC 2006 (silver); USMCC 2007 (5th) |
| 2007–08 | Greg Romaniuk | Leon Romaniuk | Doug Pottinger | Mike Calcagno | Cory Yalowicki | | USMCC 2008 (4th) |
| 2008–09 | Greg Romaniuk | Doug Pottinger | Leon Romaniuk | Troy Schroeder | | | USMCC 2009/ USOCT 2009 (5th) |
| 2009–10 | Troy Schroeder | Doug Pottinger | ? | Sean Silver | | | |
| 2010–11 | Todd Birr | Greg Romaniuk | Doug Pottinger | Tom O'Connor | Kevin Birr | | USMCC 2011 (bronze) |
| 2011–12 | Todd Birr | Greg Romaniuk | Doug Pottinger | Tom O'Connor | Kevin Birr | | USMCC 2012 (7th) |
| 2012–13 | Todd Birr | Doug Pottinger | Tom O'Connor | Kevin Birr | | | |
| 2012–13 | Todd Birr | Doug Pottinger | Greg Romaniuk | Tom O'Connor | Kevin Birr | | USMCC 2013 (9th) |
| 2013–14 | Todd Birr | Doug Pottinger | Tom O'Connor | Troy Schroeder | | | |
| 2014–15 | Todd Birr | Doug Pottinger | Greg Johnson | Tom O'Connor | | | |
| 2015–16 | Todd Birr | Doug Pottinger | John Benton | Tom O'Connor | | | USMCC 2016 (5th) |

=== Mixed doubles ===
| Season | Male | Female | Events |
|---|---|---|---|
| 2015–16 | Allison Pottinger | Doug Pottinger | USMDCC 2016 (silver) |

== Personal life ==
Pottinger met his wife Allison at the 1995 World Women's Curling Championship, where he was working on the ice crew and she was the alternate for Lisa Schoeneberg's team. Allison is a two-time Olympian and 2003 World Champion. They have two daughters.

He started curling in 1983 when he was at the age of 10.

Pottinger works as business manager for BRANDT.
