= John Dunlop (curler) =

American curler

- Curler ♂
- Born: March 1, 1975 (age 51); Milwaukee, Wisconsin, U.S.

Team
- Curling club: Madison CC, Madison, Wisconsin, Wauwatosa CC

Curling career
- Member Association: United States
- World Championship: 2 (2000, 2008)
Medal record
Curling
United States Men's Championship
Gold medal – first place	2000 Ogden
Gold medal – first place	2008 Hibbing
Silver medal – second place	2001 Madison
Silver medal – second place	2005 McFarland
United States Olympic Curling Trials
Silver medal – second place	2001 Ogden
Silver medal – second place	2005 McFarland

John Dunlop (born March 1, 1975, in Milwaukee, Wisconsin, United States) is an American curler.

At the national level, he is a two-time United States men's curling champion (2000, 2008).

== Teams ==
Season	Skip	Third	Second	Lead	Alternate	Coach	Events
1999–00	John Dunlop	Dave Brown	Richard Maskel	John Bartlett			
1999–00	Craig Brown	Ryan Quinn	Jon Brunt	John Dunlop	Steve Brown (WCC)	Diane Brown (WCC)	USMCC 2000 (gold); WCC 2000 (4th)
2000–01	Craig Brown	Ryan Quinn	Jon Brunt	John Dunlop			USMCC 2001/ USOCT 2001 (silver)
2001–02	Craig Brown	Doug Pottinger	Jon Brunt	John Dunlop	Cory Ward	Steve Brown	USMCC 2002 (3rd)
2002–03	Craig Brown	Doug Pottinger	Jon Brunt	John Dunlop			
2003–04	Craig Brown	Matt Stevens	John Dunlop	Cody Stevens	Robert Liapis		USMCC 2004 (4th)
2004–05	Craig Brown	Matt Stevens	John Dunlop	Cody Stevens	Bob Liapis		USMCC 2005/ USOCT 2005 (silver)
2005–06	Craig Brown	Matt Stevens	Cody Stevens	John Dunlop			USMCC 2006 (6th)
2006–07	Craig Brown	Donald Barcome Jr.	John Dunlop	David Brown			USMCC 2007 (4th)
2007–08	Craig Brown	Rich Ruohonen	John Dunlop	Pete Annis	Kevin Kakela (WCC)	Steve Brown (WCC)	USMCC 2008 (gold); WCC 2008 (7th)
2008–09	Craig Brown	Rich Ruohonen	John Dunlop	Pete Annis	Jon Brunt		ContCup 2008 (silver); USMCC 2009/ USOCT 2009 (4th)

== Personal life ==
John Dunlop is a fifth generation curler in his family. His great-grandfather, John M. Dunlop, was born in Ayr, Scotland, and his forefathers curled there for many generations. So, John can trace his curling roots back to the country widely recognized as the origin of the sport as we know it today. John's family was involved in the founding of the Wauwatosa and Milwaukee Curling Clubs in Wisconsin.

He started curling in 1986 at the age of 11.
