= Kevin Kakela =

American curler

- Curler ♂
- Born: August 9, 1960 (age 66); Rolla, North Dakota, U.S.

Team
- Curling club: Langdon CC, Langdon, Madison CC, Madison, Wisconsin

Curling career
- Member Association: United States
- World Championship: 2 (1997, 2008)
Medal record
Curling
United States Men's Championship
Gold medal – first place	1997 Seattle
Silver medal – second place	1998 Bismarck
Silver medal – second place	2006 Bemidji
Silver medal – second place	2007 Utica
Silver medal – second place	2008 Hibbing

Kevin Kakela (born August 9, 1960, in Rolla, North Dakota, United States) is an American curler.

At the national level, he is a 1997 United States men's champion curler.

== Honours ==
- USA Curling Athlete of the Year: 1997

== Teams ==
Season	Skip	Third	Second	Lead	Alternate	Coach	Events
1993–94	Kevin Kakela	?	?	?			1994 USMCC (???th)
1994–95	Kevin Kakela	?	?	?			1995 USMCC (4th)
1996–97	Craig Disher	Kevin Kakela	Joel Jacobson	Paul Peterson	Randy Darling (WCC)	Steve Brown (WCC)	1997 USMCC (gold); 1997 WMCC (6th)
1997–98	Kevin Kakela	?	?	?			1998 USMCC (silver)
1998–99	Kevin Kakela	?	?	?			1999 USMCC (4th)
1999–00	Craig Disher	Kevin Kakela	Joel Jacobson	Carey Kakela			2000 USMCC (6th)
2002–03	Craig Disher	Kevin Kakela	Zach Jacobson	Joel Jacobson	Carey Kakela		2003 USMCC (4th)
2003–04	Craig Disher	Kevin Kakela	Zach Jacobson	Carey Kakela	Joel Jacobson		2004 USMCC (5th)
2004–05	Craig Disher	Kevin Kakela	Joel Jacobson	Carey Kakela	Zach Jacobson		2005 USMCC/USOCT (5th)
2005–06	Craig Disher	Kevin Kakela	Zach Jacobson	Carey Kakela	Joel Jacobson		2006 USMCC (silver)
2006–07	Craig Disher	Kevin Kakela	Zach Jacobson	Carey Kakela	Joel Jacobson		2007 USMCC (silver)
2007–08	Craig Disher	Kevin Kakela	Zach Jacobson	Carey Kakela	Kurt Disher	Joel Jacobson	2008 USMCC (silver)
2007–08	Craig Brown	Rich Ruohonen	John Dunlop	Pete Annis	Kevin Kakela	Steve Brown	2008 WMCC (7th)
2008–09	Craig Disher	Kevin Kakela	Zach Jacobson	Carey Kakela	Kurt Disher		2009 USMCC/USOCT (8th)
2009–10	Kevin Kakela	Chad Carlson	Ryan Lagasse	Todd Ussatis			2010 USMCC (8th)
2010–11	Craig Disher	Kevin Kakela	Chad Carlson	Pete Annis	John Benton		2011 USMCC (8th)
2010–11	Kevin Kakela	Kurt Disher	Kyle Kakela	Pete Annis			
2011–12	Kevin Kakela	Kurt Disher	Kyle Kakela	Pete Annis			
2011–12	Craig Disher	Kevin Kakela	Kelby Smith	Gary Garceau			2012 USSCC (bronze)
2012–13	Kevin Kakela	Adam Kitchens	Kyle Kakela	Travis Kitchens			
2013–14	Kevin Kakela	Kyle Kakela	Ryan Lagasse	Todd Ussatis			
2015–16	Kevin Kakela	Owen Sampson	John Lindgren	Ethan Sampson			
2018–19	Kevin Kakela	Kyle Kakela	Ryan Lagasse	Timothy Hodek			
2019–20	Kevin Kakela	Kyle Kakela	Timothy Hodek	JP Munich	Owen Sampson		2020 USMCC (9th)

== Personal life ==
Kevin Kakela is a farm owner and resides at Hansboro, North Dakota.

His son Kyle is also a curler, he competed at the 2015 Winter Universiade. Kevin and Kyle played some years as teammates.
