= Pete Annis =

American curler

- Curler
- Born: December 17, 1962 (age 63); Mankato, Minnesota, U.S.

Curling career
- World Championship: 1 (2008)
Medal record
Curling
United States Men's Curling Championship
Gold medal – first place	2008 Hibbing, MN

Peter Annis (born December 17, 1962) is an American curler from Owatonna, Minnesota. He was a member of Team USA at the 2008 World Men's Curling Championship. Annis coached Rich Ruohonen's men's team to victory at the 2019 Americas Challenge, securing a spot for the United States at the 2020 World Men's Championship. Pete now coaches the National Wheelchair Curling Team athletes, manages program logistics, and pursues approaches that produce results.

== Teams ==
Season	Skip	Third	Second	Lead	Alternate	Coach	Events
1999–00	Ken Porosky	Pete Annis	Tim Solie	Ted McCann			
2003–04	Rich Ruohonen	Jeff Laundergan	John Benton	Pete Annis			2004 USNCC (4th)
2004–05	Rich Ruohonen	Nick Myers	John Benton	Pete Annis			2005 USOCT/USNCC (5th)
2005–06	Rich Ruohonen	Nick Myers	John Benton	Pete Annis	Tom O'Connor		2006 USNCC (5th)
2006–07	Rich Ruohonen	Troy Schroeder	John Benton	Pete Annis	Tom O'Connor		2007 USNCC (8th)
2007–08	Craig Brown	Rich Ruohonen	John Dunlop	Pete Annis	Kevin Kakela (WCC)	Steve Brown	2008 USNCC (gold) , 2008 WCC (7th)
2008–09	Craig Brown	Rich Ruohonen	John Dunlop	Pete Annis	Jon Brunt		2008 Cont. (silver) , 2009 USNCC/2010 USOCT (4th)
2009–10	Craig Brown	Rich Ruohonen	Zach Jacobson	Pete Annis			2010 USNCC (5th)
2010–11	Craig Disher	Kevin Kakela	Chad Carlson	Pete Annis	John Benton		2011 USNCC (8th)
2010–11	Kevin Kakela	Kurt Disher	Kyle Kakela	Pete Annis			
