= Randy Darling =

American curler

- Curler ♂
- Born: August 2, 1957 (age 69); Langdon, North Dakota, U.S.

Team
- Curling club: Grand Forks CC, North Dakota, Langdon CC, Langdon

Curling career
- Member Association: United States
- World Championship: 1 (1997)
- Other appearances: World Junior Championships: 1 (1979)
Medal record
Curling
World Junior Championships
Gold medal – first place	1979 Moose Jaw

Randy Darling (born August 2, 1957, in Langdon, North Dakota) is an American curler.

At the international level, he is a 1979 World junior champion curler.

At the national level, he is a 1979 United States junior champion curler.

== Teams ==
Season	Skip	Third	Second	Lead	Alternate	Coach	Events
1978–79	Donald Barcome Jr.	Randy Darling	Bobby Stalker	Earl Barcome			USJCC 1979 (gold); WJCC 1979 (gold)
1996–97	Craig Disher	Kevin Kakela	Joel Jacobson	Paul Peterson	Randy Darling	Steve Brown	WCC 1997 (6th)
1999–00	Don Barcome Jr.	Mark Haluptzok	Tim Kreklau	Tim Johnson	Randy Darling		USMCC 2000 (SF)
2000–01	Don Barcome Jr.	Mark Haluptzok	Tim Kreklau	Randy Darling	Tim Johnson		USMCC 2001 (8th)
2001–02	Don Barcome Jr.	Mark Haluptzok	Tim Kreklau	Kelby Smith	Randy Darling		USMCC 2002 (SF)
2002–03	Don Barcome Jr.	Randy Darling	Kelby Smith	Kurt Disher	Tim Kreklau		USMCC 2003 (10th)
2004–05	Don Barcome Jr.	Mark Cheatley	Randy Darling	Tim Kreklau	Kurt Disher		
