= Jason Larway =

American curler

- Curler
- Born: March 23, 1970 (age 56); Seattle, Washington, U.S.

Team
- Curling club: Granite CC, Seattle, WA

Curling career
- Member Association: United States
- World Championship: 4 (1989, 1992, 2001, 2004)
Medal record
Curling
World Championships
Bronze medal – third place	1992 Garmisch-Partenkirchen
United States Men's Championship
Gold medal – first place	1989 Detroit
Gold medal – first place	1992 Grafton
Gold medal – first place	2001 Madison
Gold medal – first place	2004 Grand Forks
Silver medal – second place	1993 St. Paul
Bronze medal – third place	2006 Bemidji
Bronze medal – third place	2007 Utica
Bronze medal – third place	2008 Hibbing

Jason Larway (born March 23, 1970) is an American curler from Lynnwood, Washington.

He is a 1992 World Men's bronze medallist and a four-times United States men's curling champion (1989, 1992, 2001, 2004).

In addition to representing the United States at the World Men's Championship, winning the National Championship in 2001 should have qualified Larway to compete at the 2001 United States Olympic Curling Trials but the entire team was deemed ineligible because, as a Canadian living in the United States, teammate Greg Romaniuk was eligible for the National Championship but not for the Olympics. Larway instead attempted to earn a spot at the Trials through the National Olympic Qualifier, which he gained entry to through the Washington State Regional Qualifier. But he had to miss the National Qualifier because it occurred at the same time as the 2001 World Men's Championship. Larway, with fellow curler Rich Ruohonen acting as his attorney, filed a grievance with the United States Olympic Committee and the United States Curling Association asking to be admitted to the Olympic Trials. Through an arbitration process he was eventually offered and accepted an extra, seventh spot at the Olympic Trials.

== Awards ==
- USA Curling Male Athlete of the Year: 2001.

== Teams ==
=== Men's ===
Season	Skip	Third	Second	Lead	Alternate	Coach	Events
1987–88	Jason Larway	Joel Larway	?	?			USJCC 1988 (silver)
1988–89	Jim Vukich	Curtis Fish	Bard Nordlund	Jim Pleasants	Jason Larway		USMCC 1989 (gold); WCC 1989 (10th)
1991–92	Doug Jones	Jason Larway	Joel Larway	Tom Violette			USMCC 1992 (gold); WCC 1992 (bronze)
1992–93	Jason Larway	Joel Larway	?	?			USMCC 1993 (silver)
1994–95	Jason Larway	Joel Larway	?	?			USMCC 1995 (???th)
1996–97	Pete Fenson	Jason Larway	Joel Larway	Eric Fenson			
1998–99	Jason Larway	Travis Way	Joel Larway	Tom Violette			
1999–00	Pete Fenson	Jason Larway	Shawn Rojeski	Eric Fenson			
2000–01	Jason Larway	Greg Romaniuk	Travis Way	Joel Larway	Doug Kauffman	Jack McNelly	USMCC 2001 (gold); WCC 2001 (6th)
2001–02	Jason Larway	Craig Disher	Travis Way	Joel Larway	Doug Kauffman	Mike Hawkins	USOCT 2001 (7th)
2001–02	Jason Larway	Greg Romaniuk	Joel Larway	Doug Kauffman			USMCC 2002 (6th)
2002–03	Jason Larway	Joel Larway	Brady Clark	Ken Trask			USMCC 2003 (9th)
2003–04	Jason Larway	Doug Pottinger	Joel Larway	Bill Todhunter	Doug Kauffman	Don Pottinger	USMCC 2004 (gold); WCC 2004 (9th)
2004–05	Jason Larway	Doug Pottinger	Joel Larway	Bill Todhunter			CCC 2004 (gold); USOCT 2005 (7th)
2005–06	Brady Clark	Wes Johnson	Jason Larway	Joel Larway			USMCC 2006 (bronze)
2006–07	Jason Larway	Colin Hufman	Joel Larway	Steven Demlow			USMCC 2007 (bronze)
2007–08	Jason Larway	Colin Hufman	Greg Persinger	Joel Larway	Steven Demlow		USMCC 2008 (bronze)
2008–09	Jason Larway	Colin Hufman	Joel Larway	Bill Todhunter	Greg Johnson		
2010–11	Jason Larway	Colin Hufman	Sean Beighton	Joel Larway			USMCC 2011 (9th)
2012–13	Mark Johnson	Jason Larway	Joel Larway	Christopher Rimple			

=== Mixed ===
Season	Skip	Third	Second	Lead	Events
2002	Brady Clark	Cristin Clark	Jason Larway	Kim Kropp	USMxCC 2002 (gold)

== Personal life ==
His brother Joel is also a curler and the two brothers played together for many years. Larway graduated from University of Washington.
