= Craig Disher =

American curler

- Curler ♂
- Born: December 21, 1958 (age 67); Rolla, North Dakota, U.S.

Team
- Curling club: Langdon CC, Langdon

Curling career
- Member Association: United States
- World Championship: 1 (1997)
Medal record
Curling
United States Men's Championship
Gold medal – first place	1997 Seattle
Silver medal – second place	1994 Duluth
Silver medal – second place	2006 Bemidji
Silver medal – second place	2007 Utica
Silver medal – second place	2008 Hibbing
Bronze medal – third place	1995 Appleton

Craig Disher (born December 21, 1958, in Rolla, North Dakota, United States) is an American curler.

At the national level, he is a 1997 United States men's champion curler. Also he is a 1996 United States mixed silver medallist.

== Teams ==
=== Men's ===
Season	Skip	Third	Second	Lead	Alternate	Coach	Events
1977–78	Craig Disher	?	?	?			1978 USJCC (???th)
1993–94	Craig Disher	?	?	?			1994 USMCC (silver)
1994–95	Craig Disher	?	?	?			1995 USMCC (bronze)
1995–96	Craig Disher	?	?	?			1996 USMCC (6th)
1996–97	Craig Disher	?	?	?			1997 USOCT (6th)
1996–97	Craig Disher	Kevin Kakela	Joel Jacobson	Paul Peterson	Randy Darling (WCC)	Steve Brown (WCC)	1997 USMCC (gold); 1997 WMCC (6th)
1999–00	Craig Disher	Kevin Kakela	Joel Jacobson	Carey Kakela			2000 USMCC (6th)
2001–02	Jason Larway	Craig Disher	Travis Way	Joel Larway	Doug Kauffman	Mike Hawkins	2001 USOCT (7th)
2002–03	Craig Disher	Kevin Kakela	Zach Jacobson	Joel Jacobson	Carey Kakela		2003 USMCC (4th)
2003–04	Craig Disher	Kevin Kakela	Zach Jacobson	Carey Kakela	Joel Jacobson		2004 USMCC (5th)
2004–05	Craig Disher	Kevin Kakela	Joel Jacobson	Carey Kakela	Zach Jacobson		2005 USMCC/USOCT (5th)
2005–06	Craig Disher	Kevin Kakela	Zach Jacobson	Carey Kakela	Joel Jacobson		2006 USMCC (silver)
2006–07	Craig Disher	Kevin Kakela	Zach Jacobson	Carey Kakela	Joel Jacobson		2007 USMCC (silver)
2007–08	Craig Disher	Kevin Kakela	Zach Jacobson	Carey Kakela	Kurt Disher	Joel Jacobson	2008 USMCC (silver)
2008–09	Craig Disher	Kevin Kakela	Zach Jacobson	Carey Kakela	Kurt Disher		2009 USMCC/USOCT (8th)
2010–11	Craig Disher	Kevin Kakela	Chad Carlson	Pete Annis	John Benton		2011 USMCC (8th)
2011–12	Craig Disher	Kevin Kakela	Kelby Smith	Gary Garceau			2012 USSCC (bronze)

=== Mixed ===
Season	Skip	Third	Second	Lead	Events
1995–96	Craig Disher	?	?	?	USMxCC 1996 (silver)

== Personal life ==
He started curling in 1970 at the age of 12.

He is married to Debbie; they have two children - daughter Kelsey and son Jaden.

Disher is employed as a farmer.
