= Paul Peterson (curler) =

American curler

- Curler ♂

Team
- Curling club: Langdon CC, Langdon

Curling career
- Member Association: United States
- World Championship: 1 (1997)
Medal record
Curling
United States Men's Championship
Gold medal – first place	1997 Seattle

Paul Peterson is an American curler.

At the national level, he is a 1997 United States men's champion curler.

== Teams ==
Season	Skip	Third	Second	Lead	Alternate	Coach	Events
1996–97	Craig Disher	Kevin Kakela	Joel Jacobson	Paul Peterson	Randy Darling (WCC)	Steve Brown (WCC)	USMCC 1997 (gold); WCC 1997 (6th)
