= Joel Jacobson =

American curler

- Curler ♂
- Born: September 15, 1951 (age 75); Langdon, North Dakota, U.S.

Team
- Curling club: Langdon CC, Langdon

Curling career
- Member Association: United States
- World Championship: 1 (1997)
Medal record
Curling
United States Men's Championship
Gold medal – first place	1997 Seattle
Silver medal – second place	2006 Bemidji
Silver medal – second place	2007 Utica

Joel Jacobson (born September 15, 1951, in Langdon, North Dakota, United States) is an American curler.

At the national level, he is a 1997 United States men's champion curler. Also he is a 1986 United States mixed champion curler.

He is a four-time North Dakota State men's curling champion and eight-time North Dakota mixed curling champion.

== Awards ==
- Ann Brown Sportsmanship Award: 2007

== Teams ==
=== Men's ===
Season	Skip	Third	Second	Lead	Alternate	Coach	Events
1993–94	Joel Jacobson	?	?	?			1994 USMCC (???th)
1994–95	Joel Jacobson	?	?	?			1995 USMCC (???th)
1996–97	Craig Disher	Kevin Kakela	Joel Jacobson	Paul Peterson	Randy Darling (WCC)	Steve Brown (WCC)	1997 USMCC (gold); 1997 WMCC (6th)
1996–97	Joel Jacobson	?	?	?			1997 USOCT (???th)
1997–98	Joel Jacobson	?	?	?			1998 USMCC (???th)
1998–99	Joel Jacobson	?	?	?			1999 USMCC (???th)
1999–00	Craig Disher	Kevin Kakela	Joel Jacobson	Carey Kakela			2000 USMCC (6th)
2002–03	Craig Disher	Kevin Kakela	Zach Jacobson	Joel Jacobson	Carey Kakela		2003 USMCC (4th)
2003–04	Craig Disher	Kevin Kakela	Zach Jacobson	Carey Kakela	Joel Jacobson		2004 USMCC (5th)
2004–05	Craig Disher	Kevin Kakela	Joel Jacobson	Carey Kakela	Zach Jacobson		2005 USMCC/USOCT (5th)
2005–06	Craig Disher	Kevin Kakela	Zach Jacobson	Carey Kakela	Joel Jacobson		2006 USMCC (silver)
2006–07	Craig Disher	Kevin Kakela	Zach Jacobson	Carey Kakela	Joel Jacobson		2007 USMCC (silver)

=== Mixed ===
Season	Skip	Third	Second	Lead	Events
1985–86	Joel Jacobson	Lori Kreklau	Tim Kreklau	Lisa Jacobson	1986 USMxCC (gold)
1987–88	Joel Jacobson	?	?	?	1988 USMxCC (???th)
1990–91	Joel Jacobson	?	?	?	1991 USMxCC (???th)
1993–94	Joel Jacobson	?	?	?	1994 USMxCC (???th)
1995–96	Joel Jacobson	?	?	?	1996 USMxCC (???th)
1996–97	Joel Jacobson	?	?	?	1997 USMxCC (???th)
1997–98	Joel Jacobson	?	?	?	1998 USMxCC (???th)
1998–99	Joel Jacobson	?	?	?	1999 USMxCC (???th)

== Personal life ==
He started curling in 1978 at the age of 27.

He is married to Lisa (with whom he won the 1986 US mixed curling championship); they have three children - sons Zach and Zane (who are also curlers) and daughter Jennifer.

Jacobson is employed as a farmer.

He graduated with a bachelor's degree from North Dakota State University.
