= Pete Fenson =

American male curler and coach

Peter Fenson
- Curler
- Born: February 29, 1968 (age 58); Bemidji, Minnesota, U.S.

Team
- Curling club: Bemidji CC, Bemidji, MN

Curling career
- Member Association: United States
- World Championship: 8 (1993, 1994, 2003, 2005, 2006, 2010, 2011, 2014)
- Olympic: 1 (2006)
Medal record
Men's curling
Winter Olympics
Bronze medal – third place	2006 Turin	Team
World Curling Championships
Bronze medal – third place	1993 Geneva	Team
United States Men's Curling Championship
Gold medal – first place	1993 St. Paul	Team
Gold medal – first place	1994 Bemidji	Team
Gold medal – first place	2003 Utica	Team
Gold medal – first place	2006 Bemidji	Team
Gold medal – first place	2010 Kalamazoo	Team
Gold medal – first place	2011 Fargo	Team
Gold medal – first place	2014 Philadelphia	Team
Silver medal – second place	2012 Philadelphia	Team
United States Olympic Curling Trials
Gold medal – first place	2005 Madison	Team
Silver medal – second place	2013 Fargo	Team

Peter Fenson (born February 29, 1968, in Bemidji, Minnesota) is an American curler. He was the skip of the men's rink that represented the United States at the 2006 Winter Olympics, where they won the bronze medal, the first Olympic medal for the United States in curling. He has won eight national championships, the most recent in Philadelphia in March 2014, and six as skip.

== Career ==
Fenson took up curling at age 13; his father, Bob Fenson, won the 1979 national championships and is now the coach of Pete's rink. Pete Fenson was a third on the national champion rinks in 1993 and 1994, and his rink, skipped by Scott Baird, made it to the semifinals of the 1993 World Curling Championship and placed fifth in 1994.

Fenson was the skip of the rink which won the 2003 U.S. national championship, and went on to take eighth place at the 2003 Ford World Curling Championship. He also participated in the 2003 Continental Cup of Curling. After finishing as runner-up in the 2004 U.S. championships, Fenson's rink won the 2005 national championship. At the 2005 World Championship, Fenson's rink finished the preliminary round in a six-way tie for first place, but was eliminated from competition in a tie-breaker against defending Olympic champion Norway. Still, Fenson's sixth-place finish earned his rink the right to represent the U.S. at the 2006 Winter Olympics in Turin, Italy.

At the Olympics, Fenson's rink had a 6–3 record in the round robin portion of the tournament, losing only to Italy and eventual finalists Finland and Canada. This put the rink in a three-way tie for second place with Canada and Great Britain; Fenson's rink faced Brad Gushue's Canadian rink in the semifinal, losing 11–5 in nine ends. Two days later, however, the rink rebounded to defeat David Murdoch's Great Britain rink in the bronze medal game 8–6, securing the first-ever American Olympic medal in curling. On January 16, 2007, the team was named the 2006 USOC Team of the Year.

Fenson's teammates in the 2009-10 curling season were Shawn Rojeski (third), Joe Polo (second), and Tyler George (lead). The team's lead for the past four years (including the 2006 Olympics), John Shuster, had decided in 2006 to depart from the team to form his own team. Fenson won the 2010 USA National Championships, which took place in Kalamazoo, Michigan. His victory earned him the right to play for the US at the 2010 World Championship in Cortina d'Ampezzo, where he and his rink finished 4th after two disappointing losses in the playoffs to David Smith's rink from Scotland. Tyler George soon left to form his own team.

With Ryan Brunt playing at the lead position, Fenson and his rink participated at the 2011 Continental Cup of Curling, where Team North America defeated Team World in a record-breaking performance. His team then went to the 2011 US Nationals and, after winning some tight matches, finished the round robin with an undefeated 9-0 win–loss record. He then edged Tyler George out in the playoffs and in the finals to become the repeat US champion, winning his seventh US national championship. He and his team represented the United States at the 2011 Ford World Men's Curling Championship at Regina, Saskatchewan, in April. The team opened with a win against Denmark, but suffered a series of close losses and finished in 10th place with a 3–8 win–loss record, their worst at a world championship.

Fenson and his team missed the playoffs at the first three events for their 2011–12 World Curling Tour season. However, they had better fortune at the Laphroaig Scotch Open, where they flew through the knockout round and defeated David Brown in the final to win the event. Fenson and his rink were selected to represent the United States at the 2012 USA-Brazil Challenge to play against Brazil for a spot in the World Championships in Basel, but Brazil withdrew from the challenge. Fenson then participated in the 2012 Continental Cup of Curling, where Team World won a close tournament over Team North America. Fenson participated in the 2012 United States Men's Curling Championship, and went through the round robin with a 9–1 win–loss record. In the playoffs, he was defeated by Heath McCormick, who had previously beaten him in the round robin, but rebounded with a win in the semifinal over former teammate John Shuster. In the final, he lost a close game to Heath McCormick, losing his bid for a third consecutive nationals title and a chance to play at the world championships.

Fenson and his team played at the 2013 United States Men's Curling Championship, but failed to qualify for the playoffs, losing to McCormick in a five-team tiebreaker.

Upon their semifinal win at the 2012 United States Men's Curling Championship, Fenson and his team were qualified to participate at the 2014 United States Olympic Curling Trials. Fenson and his team finished second in the round robin, and played John Shuster in the three-game final round, but lost after a lopsided third game. Fenson was hired by NBC Sports to work as a curling analyst during the Olympic games.

== Personal life ==
Fenson is married to his wife Roxanne and has two sons, Alex and Graem. He enjoys golf, biking, and spending time with family. His brother, Eric Fenson, is a curler and former teammate. His son Alex is a member of his team.

Fenson has a bachelor's degree in technical illustration and graphic design. He is the owner of a restaurant, Dave's Pizza, which operates in Bemidji, Minnesota. He is currently employed as a coach with USA Curling.

== Grand Slam record ==
Fenson was only active in Grand Slam events between 2003 and 2009

Key
C	Champion
F	Lost in Final
SF	Lost in Semifinal
QF	Lost in Quarterfinals
R16	Lost in the round of 16
Q	Did not advance to playoffs
T2	Played in Tier 2 event
DNP	Did not participate in event
N/A	Not a Grand Slam event that season

Event	2003–04	2004–05	2005–06	2006–07	2007–08	2008–09
Masters	Q	DNP	DNP	Q	DNP	DNP
Canadian Open	DNP	DNP	DNP	Q	DNP	Q
The National	DNP	DNP	Q	Q	Q	DNP
Players'	DNP	QF	QF	DNP	DNP	DNP

== Teams ==
Season	Skip	Third	Second	Lead	Events
1993–94	Scott Baird	Pete Fenson	Mark Haluptzok	Tim Johnson	1993 USNCC, WCC
1994–95	Scott Baird	Pete Fenson	Mark Haluptzok	Tim Johnson	1994 USNCC, WCC
1996–97	Pete Fenson	Jason Larway	Joel Larway	Eric Fenson	
1998–99	Pete Fenson	Eric Fenson	Shawn Rojeski	Mark Haluptzok	
1999–00	Pete Fenson	Jason Larway	Shawn Rojeski	Eric Fenson	
2003–04	Pete Fenson	Eric Fenson	Shawn Rojeski	John Shuster	2003 Cont., USNCC, WCC
2004–05	Pete Fenson	Shawn Rojeski	Joe Polo	John Shuster	2005 USOCT/USNCC, WCC
2005–06	Pete Fenson	Shawn Rojeski	Joe Polo	Doug Pottinger	2006 Cont.
2005–06	Pete Fenson	Shawn Rojeski	Joe Polo	John Shuster	2006 USNCC, OG, WCC
2006–07	Pete Fenson	Shawn Rojeski	Joe Polo	John Shuster	
2007–08	Pete Fenson	Shawn Rojeski	Joe Polo	John Shuster	2008 USNCC
2008–09	Pete Fenson	Shawn Rojeski	Joe Polo	Tom O'Connor	
2009–10	Pete Fenson	Shawn Rojeski	Joe Polo	Tyler George	2010 USNCC, WCC
2010–11	Pete Fenson	Shawn Rojeski	Joe Polo	Ryan Brunt	2011 Cont., USNCC, WCC
2011–12	Pete Fenson	Shawn Rojeski	Joe Polo	Ryan Brunt	2012 Cont., USNCC
2012–13	Pete Fenson	Shawn Rojeski	Joe Polo	Ryan Brunt	2013 USNCC
2013–14	Pete Fenson	Shawn Rojeski	Joe Polo	Ryan Brunt	2014 USNCC
2015–16	Chris Plys (Fourth)	Pete Fenson (Skip)	Joe Polo	Jason Smith	2016 USNCC
2016–17	Pete Fenson	Jared Zezel	Mark Fenner	Alex Fenson	

== Awards and honors ==
- USA Curling Athlete of the Year: 2003, 2005, 2011
- USA Curling Team of the Year: 2006
- United States Olympic Committee Team of the Month: December 2005
- United States Olympic Committee Team of the Year: 2006

== See also ==
- Curling at the 2006 Winter Olympics
