= Scott Baird =

American curler and Olympic medalist

- Curler
- Born: May 7, 1951 (age 75); Bemidji, Minnesota, U.S.

Curling career
- World Championship: 7 (1979, 1993, 1994, 2003, 2005, 2006, 2011)
- Olympic: 1 (2006)
Medal record
Men's curling
Representing the United States
Olympic Games
Bronze medal – third place	2006 Turin	Team competition
World Curling Championships
Bronze medal – third place	1993 Geneva

Scott Baird (born May 7, 1951) is an American curler. At 54, he is the oldest American athlete to ever participate in the Winter Olympics, which he did at the 2006 Winter Olympics. Despite this feat, Baird was only the alternate for Pete Fenson's U.S. team and did not throw a stone, although he still received a bronze medal. On January 16, 2007, the team was named the 2006 USOC Team of the Year.

In addition to the Olympics, Baird has skipped the U.S. team to three World Championship events (1979, 1993 & 1994), winning bronze in 1993. In 2003, Baird skipped the U.S. team to the silver medal at World Seniors Championship. In 2003, 2005, 2006, and 2011, Baird was the alternate player for Pete Fenson at the World Championships.

In 2005 Baird was inducted into the United States Curling Association Hall of Fame.
