= Phill Drobnick =

American curling coach (born 1980)

- Curler
- Born: Phillip Drobnick; October 8, 1980 (age 46); Virginia, Minnesota, U.S.
Medal record
Men's curling
Representing United States
US Men's Championship
Silver medal – second place	2011 Fargo
US Olympic Trials
Bronze medal – third place	2001 Ogden

Phillip Drobnick (born October 8, 1980, in Virginia, Minnesota) is an American curler who has been involved with the sport of curling since 1986 and is currently serving as the Director of Coaching and National Team Director for USA Curling.

As head coach for the USA Curling program's Men's, Women's and Mixed Doubles teams.

== Curling career ==
Drobnick won the Minnesota State junior Championship in 2000 and 2003, allowing him to advance to the United States Junior National Championships. In 2000, Drobnick won the gold medal and advanced to the World Junior Championships in Geising, Germany, where he finished 6th. He competed in the United States Olympic curling trials for the 2002 and 2010 Winter Olympics, receiving bronze in the trials in 2001. At the 2011 United States Men's Curling Championship he played lead on Tyler George's team and finished second, losing in the final to Pete Fenson.

== Coaching career ==
Drobnick started coaching the Chris Plys junior rink in the fall of 2006, coaching the team through two Minnesota State junior Championships (2007 and 2008), two United States Junior Championships, and two World Junior Curling Championships. In 2008, the team won the World Junior Championships in Östersund, Sweden, marking the first win for the United States in 24 years. In 2009, Drobnick lead Team Plys to the World Junior Championship once again, where the team won the bronze medal.

In 2016, Drobnick coached the Men's team to a bronze medal at the Men's World Championships in Switzerland and to a gold medal at the World Cup of Curling in Omaha Nebraska two years later, in 2018. That same year, Drobnick was promoted to Director of Coaching for USA Curling where, in addition to coaching the men's national team, he oversaw a staff of six team coaches.

He served as the National Coach for Team USA at the World Mixed Doubles Championship in 2023, leading Korey Dropkin and Cory Thiesse to a Mixed Doubles World Championship title.

== Olympics ==
Drobnick coached in four Winter Olympic Games (2010, 2018, 2022 and 2026).

Drobnick coached the U.S. Men's Team, led by Skip John Shuster, during the 2010 Winter Olympics in Vancouver, and is best known for coaching Team Shuster to the United States’ historic first ever gold medal in curling in the 2018 Winter Olympics in PyeongChang.

In 2022, he was named head Olympic Coach for all three disciplines – U.S. Men's, Women's and Mixed Doubles.

At the 2026 Olympics in Milano-Cortina, Drobnick lead the U.S. Mixed Doubles team, Korey Dropkin and Cory Thiesse, to a silver medal, making history with Cory Thiesse becoming the first American female to ever medal in the sport of Curling. Drobnick's Women's and Men's teams had notable performances as well – the women's team finished fourth, tying for their best finish in U.S. history.

Drobnick advocates for an athlete-centered, coach-driven approach, focusing on technical development and ice mapping. He prioritizes team closeness, crediting his“ONE TEAM USA” vision for the teams’ success in Milano-Cortina.

In 2025, Drobnick announced that the 2026 Winter Olympics would be his last. He retired from head coaching in the Spring of 2026, transitioning to an administrative role for USA Curling.

== Personal life ==
Drobnick grew up in Eveleth, Minnesota, and studied at the University of Minnesota Duluth. He lives in Woodbury, Minnesota. Prior to coaching full time, he worked as a probation officer in St. Louis County. He is married to Shannon Drobnick and has two sons.

== Advocacy and philanthropy ==
In 2019, Drobnick was appointed to the Minnesota Commission on Judicial Selection.

He was named to the Governor-appointed Amateur Sports Commission in 2019.

He was named to the Governor-appointed Juvenile Justice Advisory Commission in 2023.

He currently serves as President of the Curl Mesabi Foundation and is Founder and Vice President of the Golden Bear Foundation.
