= Craig Brown (curler) =

American curler

- Curler
- Born: August 18, 1975 (age 51); Madison, Wisconsin, U.S.

Team
- Curling club: Fairbanks Curling Club; Fairbanks, Alaska
- Skip: Greg Persinger
- Third: Dominik Märki
- Second: Alex Leichter
- Lead: Shawn Banyai
- Alternate: Craig Brown

Curling career
- Member Association: United States
- World Championship: 2 (2000, 2008)
- Olympic: 1 (2014)
Medal record
Curling
World Junior Championships
Bronze medal – third place	1994 Sofia
United States Men's Curling Championship
Gold medal – first place	2000 Ogden, UT
Gold medal – first place	2008 Hibbing, MN
Silver medal – second place	2001 Madison
Silver medal – second place	2005 Madison
Silver medal – second place	2014 Philadelphia
Silver medal – second place	2015 Kalamazoo
Bronze medal – third place	2016 Jacksonville
United States Olympic Curling Trials
Silver medal – second place	2005 Madison

Craig Brown (born August 18, 1975) is an American curler.

Born in Madison, Wisconsin, he is one of the top skips in the U.S. He was the skip of the 2000 and 2008 U.S. champion rinks. At the 2000 Ford World Curling Championships, Brown skipped the U.S. team to a fourth-place finish, losing to Finland in the final.

Brown played third on the U.S. team at three World Junior Curling Championships (1994, 1995, 1997). Mike Peplinski skipped the team in 1994 and 1995, while Matt Stevens skipped the team in 1997. Brown won the bronze medal with Peplinski in 1994.

At the 2014 Olympics, Brown played as alternate for the USA team.

Brown attended La Follette High School and is employed by Steve's Curling Supplies.

== Teammates ==
2008 Grand Forks World Championships

- Rich Ruohonen, Third
- John Dunlop, Second
- Peter Annis, Lead
- Kevin Kakela, Alternate
