= 2013 Point Optical Curling Classic =

- Host city: Saskatoon, Saskatchewan
- Arena: Nutana Curling Club
- Dates: September 27–30
- Winner: (Manitoba) Jeff Stoughton
- Curling club: Charleswood CC, Winnipeg
- Skip: Jeff Stoughton
- Third: Jon Mead
- Second: Reid Carruthers
- Lead: Mark Nichols
- Finalist: (Alberta) Kevin Martin

The 2013 Point Optical Curling Classic was held from September 27 to 30 at the Nutana Curling Club in Saskatoon, Saskatchewan as part of the 2013–14 World Curling Tour. The event was held in a triple knockout format, and the purse for the event was CAD$50,000, of which the winner, Jeff Stoughton, received CAD$12,000. Stoughton defeated Kevin Martin's team in the final with a score of 6–2. Martin's team was skipped by third Nedohin after Martin went out with a back injury, while Jeff Sharp subbed in as lead.

== Teams ==
The teams are listed as follows:

| Skip | Third | Second | Lead | Locale |
|---|---|---|---|---|
| Tom Appelman | Nathan Connolly | Brandon Klassen | Parker Konschuh | Edmonton, Alberta |
| Matthew Blandford | Darren Moulding | Brent Hamilton | Brad Chyz | Calgary, Alberta |
| Brendan Bottcher | Micky Lizmore | Bradley Thiessen | Karrick Martin | Edmonton, Alberta |
| Brady Clark | Sean Beighton | Darren Lehto | Phil Tilker | (Washington (state)) Lynnwood, Washington |
| Richard Daneault | Chris Galbraith | Braden Zawada | Mike Neufeld | Winnipeg, Manitoba |
| Niklas Edin | Sebastian Kraupp | Fredrik Lindberg | Viktor Kjäll | Karlstad, Sweden |
| Pete Fenson | Shawn Rojeski | Joe Polo | Ryan Brunt | Bemidji, Minnesota |
| Rob Fowler | Allan Lyburn | Brendan Taylor | Derek Samagalski | Brandon, Manitoba |
| Brad Gushue | Brett Gallant | Adam Casey | Geoff Walker | St. John's, Newfoundland and Labrador |
| Brad Jacobs | Ryan Fry | E. J. Harnden | Ryan Harnden | Sault Ste. Marie, Ontario |
| Jason Jacobson | Clint Dieno | Dane Roy | Matt Froehlich | Saskatoon, Saskatchewan |
| Joel Jordison | Jason Ackerman | Brent Goeres | Curtis Horwath | Regina, Saskatchewan |
| Shawn Joyce | Dale Craig | Dustin Phillips | Cory Fleming | Saskatoon, Saskatchewan |
| Mark Kean | Travis Fanset | Patrick Janssen | Tim March | Ontario |
| Kevin Koe | Pat Simmons | Carter Rycroft | Nolan Thiessen | Calgary, Alberta |
| Jared Kolomaya | Neil Kitching | Kennedy Bird | Daniel Hunt | Winnipeg, Manitoba |
| Bruce Korte | Dean Kleiter | Roger Korte | Rob Markowsky | Saskatoon, Saskatchewan |
| Steve Laycock | Kirk Muyres | Colton Flasch | Dallan Muyres | Saskatoon, Saskatchewan |
| William Lyburn | Alex Forrest | Connor Njegovan | Tyler Forrest | Winnipeg, Manitoba |
| Scott Manners | Carl Smith | Ryan Deis | Mark Larsen | North Battleford, Saskatchewan |
| Kevin Marsh | Matt Ryback | Daniel Marsh | Aaron Shutra | Saskatoon, Saskatchewan |
| Kevin Martin | David Nedohin | Marc Kennedy | Ben Hebert | Edmonton, Alberta |
| Heath McCormick | Bill Stopera | Martin Sather | Dean Gemmell | (New York (state)) New York City, New York |
| Sven Michel | Claudio Pätz | Sandro Trolliet | Simon Gempeler | Adelboden, Switzerland |
| Yusuke Morozumi | Tsuyoshi Yamaguchi | Tetsuro Shimizu | Kosuke Morozumi | Karuizawa, Japan |
| Jim Cotter (fourth) | John Morris (skip) | Tyrel Griffith | Rick Sawatsky | Vernon, British Columbia |
| Chris Lemishka (fourth) | Dean Ross (skip) | Tyler Pfeiffer | Neal Woloschuk | Edmonton, Alberta |
| Brady Scharback | | | | Regina, Saskatchewan |
| Robert Schlender | Aaron Sluchinski | Justin Sluchinski | Dylan Webster | Airdrie, Alberta |
| John Shuster | Jeff Isaacson | Jared Zezel | John Landsteiner | Duluth, Minnesota |
| Jeff Stoughton | Jon Mead | Reid Carruthers | Mark Nichols | Winnipeg, Manitoba |
| Brock Virtue | Braeden Moskowy | Chris Schille | D. J. Kidby | Regina, Saskatchewan |

== Knockout results ==
The draw is listed as follows:

=== A event ===
First Knockout
(Ontario) Brad Jacobs | 5
(Saskatchewan) Brady Scharback | 2
(Japan) Yusuke Morozumi | 6
(Minnesota) Pete Fenson | 5
(British Columbia) John Morris | 7
(Alberta) Tom Appelman | 2
(Switzerland) Sven Michel | 2
(Alberta) Robert Schlender | 1
(Sweden) Niklas Edin | 3
(Saskatchewan) Scott Manners | 2
(Minnesota) John Shuster | 4
(Saskatchewan) Bruce Korte | 6
(Newfoundland and Labrador) Brad Gushue | 3
(Saskatchewan) Joel Jordison | 6
(Alberta) Brendan Bottcher | 5
(Manitoba) Richard Daneault | 3

Quarterfinals
(Ontario) Brad Jacobs | 9
(Japan) Yusuke Morozumi | 2
(British Columbia) John Morris | 5
(Switzerland) Sven Michel | 4
(Sweden) Niklas Edin | 5
(Saskatchewan) Bruce Korte | 6
(Saskatchewan) Joel Jordison | 2
(Alberta) Brendan Bottcher | 7

Semifinals
(Ontario) Brad Jacobs | 6
(British Columbia) John Morris | 3
(Saskatchewan) Bruce Korte | 5
(Alberta) Brendan Bottcher | 6

Qualifier 1
(Ontario) Brad Jacobs | 7
(Alberta) Brendan Bottcher | 4

First Knockout
(Manitoba) Jeff Stoughton | 4
(Saskatchewan) Shawn Joyce | 3
(Washington (state)) Brady Clark | 5
(Saskatchewan) Jason Jacobson | 4
(Ontario) Mark Kean | 6
(New York (state)) Heath McCormick | 5
(Saskatchewan) Steve Laycock | 7
(Alberta) Matthew Blandford | 8
(Alberta) Kevin Koe | 6
(Manitoba) Jared Kolomaya | 3
(Manitoba) William Lyburn | 6
(Saskatchewan) Brock Virtue | 5
(Alberta) Kevin Martin | 6
(Alberta) Dean Ross | 4
(Manitoba) Rob Fowler | 8
(Saskatchewan) Kevin Marsh | 4

Quarterfinals
(Manitoba) Jeff Stoughton | 7
(Washington (state)) Brady Clark | 1
(Ontario) Mark Kean | 5
(Alberta) Matthew Blandford | 4
(Alberta) Kevin Koe | 5'
(Manitoba) William Lyburn | 4
(Alberta) Kevin Martin | 6
(Manitoba) Rob Fowler | 2

Semifinals
(Manitoba) Jeff Stoughton | 6
(Ontario) Mark Kean | 3
(Alberta) Kevin Koe | 4
(Alberta) Kevin Martin | 5

Qualifier 2
(Manitoba) Jeff Stoughton | 10
(Alberta) Kevin Martin | 3

=== B event ===
Second Knockout
(Saskatchewan) Brady Scharback | 3
(Minnesota) Pete Fenson | 6
(Alberta) Tom Appelman | 6
(Alberta) Robert Schlender | 3
(Saskatchewan) Scott Manners | 4
(Minnesota) John Shuster | 6
(Newfoundland and Labrador) Brad Gushue | 6
(Manitoba) Richard Daneault | 2

Quarterfinals
(Minnesota) Pete Fenson | 7
(Alberta) Tom Appelman | 1
(Minnesota) John Shuster | 3
(Newfoundland and Labrador) Brad Gushue | 7

Semifinals
(Minnesota) Pete Fenson | 6
(Ontario) Mark Kean | 4
(Newfoundland and Labrador) Brad Gushue | 5
(Alberta) Kevin Koe | 9

To Qualifier 3
(Minnesota) Pete Fenson | 1
(Alberta) Kevin Koe | 6
Qualifier 3
(Alberta) Kevin Koe | 7
(Alberta) Brendan Bottcher | 5

| Second Knockout | | Semifinals | | To Qualifier 3 |
| (Washington (state)) Brady Clark | 4 |
| (Alberta) Matthew Blandford | 6 | (Alberta) Matthew Blandford | 5 |
| (Manitoba) William Lyburn | 7 | (Manitoba) William Lyburn | 4 |
| (Manitoba) Rob Fowler | 4 | | | (Alberta) Matthew Blandford | 5 |
| | | | | (Alberta) Brendan Bottcher | 6 |

| Second Knockout | | Semifinals | | To Qualifier 4 |
| (Japan) Yusuke Morozumi | 5 |
| (Switzerland) Sven Michel | 8 | (Switzerland) Sven Michel | 6 |
| (Sweden) Niklas Edin | 6 | (Sweden) Niklas Edin | 8 |
| (Saskatchewan) Joel Jordison | 2 | | | (Sweden) Niklas Edin | 6 |
| | | | | (Alberta) Kevin Martin | 9 |

Second Knockout
(Saskatchewan) Shawn Joyce | 6
(Saskatchewan) Jason Jacobson | 3
(New York (state)) Heath McCormick | 3
(Saskatchewan) Steve Laycock | 6
(Manitoba) Jared Kolomaya | 2
(Saskatchewan) Brock Virtue | 7
(Alberta) Dean Ross | 2
(Saskatchewan) Kevin Marsh | 5

Quarterfinals
(Saskatchewan) Shawn Joyce | 5
(Saskatchewan) Steve Laycock | 4
(Saskatchewan) Brock Virtue | 7
(Saskatchewan) Kevin Marsh | 8

Semifinals
(British Columbia) John Morris | 8
(Saskatchewan) Shawn Joyce | 6
(Saskatchewan) Bruce Korte | 5
(Saskatchewan) Kevin Marsh | 1

To Qualifier 4
(British Columbia) John Morris | 5
(Saskatchewan) Bruce Korte | 1
Qualifier 4
(Alberta) Kevin Martin | 6
(British Columbia) John Morris | 3

=== C event ===
Third Knockout
(Saskatchewan) Brady Scharback | 1
(Alberta) Robert Schlender | 7

Quarterfinals
(Switzerland) Sven Michel | 5
(Alberta) Robert Schlender | 2
(Saskatchewan) Shawn Joyce | 1
(Saskatchewan) Kevin Marsh | 7

Semifinals
(Switzerland) Sven Michel | 6
(Saskatchewan) Kevin Marsh | 4

Qualifier 5
(Switzerland) Sven Michel | 4
(Alberta) Brendan Bottcher | 6

Third Knockout
(Saskatchewan) Scott Manners | 8
(Manitoba) Richard Daneault | 2
(Alberta) Tom Appelman | 6
(Minnesota) John Shuster | 3

Quarterfinals
(Saskatchewan) Scott Manners | 8
(Washington (state)) Brady Clark | 3
(Manitoba) Rob Fowler | 7
(Alberta) Tom Appelman | 2

Semifinals
(Saskatchewan) Scott Manners | 6
(Sweden) Niklas Edin | 3
(Manitoba) Rob Fowler | 8
(Saskatchewan) Bruce Korte | 2

Qualifier 6
(Saskatchewan) Scott Manners | 3
(Manitoba) Rob Fowler | 6

Third Knockout
(Saskatchewan) Steve Laycock | 6
(Saskatchewan) Brock Virtue | 7
(Saskatchewan) Jason Jacobson | 5
(New York (state)) Heath McCormick | 6

Quarterfinals
(Japan) Yusuke Morozumi | 7
(Saskatchewan) Brock Virtue | 2
(Saskatchewan) Joel Jordison | 3
(New York (state)) Heath McCormick | 5

Semifinals
(Japan) Yusuke Morozumi | 5
(Minnesota) Pete Fenson | 8
(New York (state)) Heath McCormick | 3
(Alberta) Matthew Blandford | 5

Qualifier 7
(Minnesota) Pete Fenson | 3
(Alberta) Matthew Blandford | 5

Third Knockout
(Manitoba) Jared Kolomaya | 8
(Alberta) Dean Ross | 7

Quarterfinals
(Ontario) Mark Kean | 4
(Newfoundland and Labrador) Brad Gushue | 3
(Manitoba) William Lyburn | 4
(Manitoba) Jared Kolomaya | 6

Semifinals
(Ontario) Mark Kean | 10
(Manitoba) Jared Kolomaya | 4

Qualifier 8
(Ontario) Mark Kean | 6
(British Columbia) John Morris | 7

== Playoffs ==
Quarterfinals
(Ontario) Brad Jacobs | 5
(Alberta) Brendan Bottcher | 1
(Alberta) Kevin Martin | 6
(Manitoba) Rob Fowler | 2
(Manitoba) Jeff Stoughton | 8
(Alberta) Matthew Blandford | 2
(Alberta) Kevin Koe | 6
(British Columbia) John Morris | 0

Semifinals
(Ontario) Brad Jacobs | 1
(Alberta) Kevin Martin | 4
(Manitoba) Jeff Stoughton | 7
(Alberta) Kevin Koe | 3

Final
(Alberta) Kevin Martin^{1} | 2
(Manitoba) Jeff Stoughton | 6

Notes

1. Martin's third David Nedohin skipped the team in the final.
