= Kroy Nernberger =

American curler

- Curler ♂
- Born: February 27, 1984 (age 42); Medford, Wisconsin, U.S.

Team
- Curling club: Medford CC, Medford, Wisconsin
- Mixed doubles partner: Nina Roth

Curling career
- Member Association: United States
- World Championship: 1 (2016)
Medal record
Curling
World Championships
Bronze medal – third place	2016 Edmonton
United States Men's Championship
Silver medal – second place	2014 Philadelphia
Silver medal – second place	2015 Kalamazoo
Bronze medal – third place	2016 Jacksonville

Kroy Everett Nernberger (born February 27, 1984) is an American curler from Madison, Wisconsin. He was a bronze medalist at the 2016 World Men's Curling Championship as alternate on John Shuster's Team USA.

== Curling career ==
Nernberger competed in three Junior National Championships, with his best finish at fourth place in 2002 and 2004. He has medaled at the Men's National Championship three times, all in a row on skip Craig Brown's team, silver in 2014 and 2015 and bronze in 2016. Later in 2016 Nernberger was invited to be alternate on the US Champion team, skipped by John Shuster, as they represented the United States at the World Championship. There they won the bronze medal, defeating Japan's Yusuke Morozumi in the bronze medal match.

Nernberger returned to national-level curling at the 2025 United States Mixed Doubles Curling Olympic Trials, playing with teammate Nina Roth. They would finish just outside the playoffs in 6th place with a 5-4 record, being eliminated on head-to-head results.

== Teams ==
=== Men's ===
Season	Skip	Third	Second	Lead	Alternate	Coach	Events
2001–02	Ryan Lemke	Kroy Nernberger	Adam Weiland	Bryan Amundson		Bev Schroeder	2002 USJCC (4th)
2003–04	Ryan Lemke	Ryan Brunt	Kroy Nernberger	Craig Amundson			2004 USJCC (4th)
2004–05	Ryan Lemke	Ryan Brunt	Kroy Nernberger	Jason Gerstenkorn			2005 USJCC (5th)
2006–07	Jeremy Roe	Matt Hamilton	Scott Templeton	Mark Hartman	Kroy Nernberger	Ed Sheffield	2007 USMCC (7th)
2009–10	Kroy Nernberger	Ryan Lemke	Jake Will	Steve Day			
2010–11	Kroy Nernberger	Ryan Lemke	Jake Will	Steve Day			
2011–12	Craig Brown	Matt Hamilton	Kroy Nernberger	Derrick Casper			2012 USMCC (4th)
2012–13	Craig Brown	Kroy Nernberger	Matt Hamilton	Jon Brunt			2013 USMCC (7th)
2013–14	Craig Brown	Kroy Nernberger	Matt Hamilton	Jon Brunt			2014 USMCC (silver)
2014–15	Craig Brown	Kroy Nernberger	Sean Beighton	Jared Zezel	Alex Leichter	Phill Drobnick	2015 USMCC (silver)
2015–16	Craig Brown	Kroy Nernberger	Jared Zezel	Sean Beighton			2016 USMCC (bronze)
2015–16	John Shuster	Tyler George	Matt Hamilton	John Landsteiner	Kroy Nernberger	Phill Drobnick	2016 WMCC (bronze)
2016–17	Craig Brown	Kroy Nernberger	Jason Smith	Sean Beighton	Quinn Evenson	Scott Baird	2017 USMCC (4th)
2017–18	Craig Brown	Kroy Nernberger	Jason Smith	Sean Beighton	Quinn Evenson		
2017–18	Sean Beighton (4th)	Kroy Nernberger (skip)	Derrick McLean	Quinn Evenson			2018 USMCC (4th)
2018–19	Greg Persinger (4th)	Rich Ruohonen (skip)	Sean Beighton	Kroy Nernberger		Phill Drobnick	CWC/1 (6th)
2019–20	Rich Ruohonen	Greg Persinger	Colin Hufman	Philip Tilker	Kroy Nernberger		2020 USMCC (silver)
2020–21	Rich Ruohonen	Andrew Stopera	Colin Hufman	Philip Tilker	Kroy Nernberger		2021 USMCC (7th)
2021–22	Rich Ruohonen	Andrew Stopera	Colin Hufman	Kroy Nernberger	Philip Tilker		

=== Mixed ===
Season	Skip	Third	Second	Lead	Alternate	Events
2007	Ryan Lemke	Jackie Lemke	Kroy Nernberger	Sydney Johnson		2007 USMxCC (bronze)
2008	Ryan Lemke	Jackie Lemke	Kroy Nernberger	Rebecca Wood	Megan O'Connell	2008 USMxCC (silver)

=== Mixed doubles ===
Season	Male	Female	Events
2015–16	Kroy Nernberger	Nina Roth	2016 USMDCC (bronze)
2016–17	Kroy Nernberger	Nina Roth	2017 USMDCC (bronze)
2018–19	Kroy Nernberger	Nina Roth	2019 USMDCC (bronze)
2021–22	Kroy Nernberger	Tara Peterson	
2024-25	Kroy Nernberger	Nina Roth	2025 USMDOT (6th)

== Private life ==
Kroy Nernberger attended University of Wisconsin–Madison. He works for Spectrum Brands and has some inventions.

He started curling in 1997, when he was 13 years old.
