= Greg Persinger =

American curler

- Curler
- Born: February 26, 1978 (age 48); Fairbanks, Alaska, U.S.

Team
- Curling club: Fairbanks CC, Fairbanks, AK
- Skip: Greg Persinger
- Third: Dominik Märki
- Second: Alex Leichter
- Lead: Shawn Banyai

Curling career
- Member Association: United States
- World Championship: 2 (2013, 2018)
Medal record
Curling
United States Men's Curling Championship
Gold medal – first place	2016 Jacksonville
Gold medal – first place	2018 Fargo
Silver medal – second place	2019 Kalamazoo
Silver medal – second place	2020 Cheney
Bronze medal – third place	2017 Everett
Bronze medal – third place	2008 Hibbing
Bronze medal – third place	2005 Madison

Greg Persinger (born February 26, 1978) is an American curler. He was born in Fairbanks, Alaska. He was a member of Team USA at the 2018 World Men's Curling Championship.

At the 2020 United States Men's Championship Persinger and Team Ruohonen earned a silver medal, losing to John Shuster in the final.

== Teams ==
Season	Skip	Third	Second	Lead	Alternate	Coach	Events
1996–97	Matt Stevens	Craig Brown	Bob Liapis	Jeremy Fogelson	Greg Persinger		1997 WJCC (9th)
1997–98	Greg Persinger	Matt Rudig	Brady Clark	Leo Johnson	Bob Liapis		1998 USJCC (SF)
1998–99	Ryan Quinn	Greg Persinger	Derrick Casper	Kevin Deeren	Tom Casper		1999 USJCC (SF)
2003–04	Brady Clark	Greg Persinger	Leo Johnson	Ken Trask			2004 USMCC (8th)
2004–05	Brady Clark	Greg Persinger	Colin Hufman	Ken Trask	Doug Kauffman		2005 USMCC/USOCT (bronze)
2007–08	Jason Larway	Colin Hufman	Greg Persinger	Joel Larway	Steven Demlow		2008 USMCC (bronze)
2012–13	Greg Persinger	Nicholas Myers	Sean Murray	Tim Gartner			2013 USMCC (8th)
2012–13	Brady Clark	Sean Beighton	Darren Lehto	Philip Tilker	Greg Persinger	Ken Trask	2013 WMCC (9th)
2013–14	Brady Clark	Sean Beighton	Darren Lehto	Philip Tilker	Greg Persinger		2013 USOCT (5th)
2013–14	Brady Clark	Sean Beighton	Greg Persinger	Philip Tilker			2014 USMCC (4th)
2014–15	Brady Clark	Greg Persinger	Nick Myers	Matt Birklid	Philip Tilker		2015 USMCC (8th)
2015–16	Brady Clark	Greg Persinger	Colin Hufman	Philip Tilker			2016 USMCC (gold)
2016–17	Brady Clark	Greg Persinger	Colin Hufman	Philip Tilker			2017 USMCC (bronze)
2017–18	Brady Clark	Greg Persinger	Colin Hufman	Philip Tilker			2017 USOCT (5th)
2017–18	Greg Persinger (fourth)	Rich Ruohonen (skip)	Colin Hufman	Philip Tilker	Chris Plys (WMCC)	Phill Drobnick	2018 USMCC (gold); 2018 WMCC (6th)
2018–19	Greg Persinger (fourth)	Rich Ruohonen (skip)	Colin Hufman	Philip Tilker			2019 USMCC (silver)
2019–20	Rich Ruohonen	Greg Persinger	Colin Hufman	Philip Tilker	Kroy Nernberger		2020 USMCC (silver)
2020–21	Greg Persinger	Dominik Märki	Alex Leichter	Shawn Banyai	Craig Brown		
2021–22	Greg Persinger	Dominik Märki	Alex Leichter	Shawn Banyai			

== Grand Slam record ==
Key
C	Champion
F	Lost in Final
SF	Lost in Semifinal
QF	Lost in Quarterfinals
R16	Lost in the round of 16
Q	Did not advance to playoffs
T2	Played in Tier 2 event
DNP	Did not participate in event
N/A	Not a Grand Slam event that season

Event	2007–08	2008–09	2009–10	2010–11	2011–12	2012–13	2013–14	2014–15	2015–16	2016–17	2017–18	2018–19	2019–20
Masters	Q	DNP	DNP	DNP	DNP	DNP	DNP	DNP	DNP	DNP	DNP	DNP	DNP
Tour Challenge	N/A	N/A	N/A	N/A	N/A	N/A	N/A	N/A	DNP	T2	DNP	QF	T2
Champions Cup	N/A	N/A	N/A	N/A	N/A	N/A	N/A	N/A	Q	DNP	QF	DNP	N/A
