= Paul Lyttle =

Canadian-American curler

- Curler
- Born: February 24, 1977 (age 49); Fonthill, Ontario, Canada

Team
- Curling club: Granite CC; Seattle, Washington, U.S.
- Skip: Brandon Corbett
- Third: Paul Lyttle
- Second: Derek Corbett
- Lead: Jared Wydysh

Paul Lyttle (born February 24, 1977) is a Canadian-American curler from Lynnwood, Washington. He has competed in four United States Men's Curling Championships. He curls out of the Granite Curling Club in Seattle, Washington.

== Career ==
Lyttle began to curl in 1992 at age 14 after being convinced by a friend to join his high school's curling team. He quickly took to the sport, participating in the 1993 and 1994 Ontario School Provincial Championships (OFSAA), where he finished 3rd and 4th respectively.

Lyttle has participated in four United States Men's Curling Championships in his career. In 2010, he played for the Wes Johnson rink out of Washington. The team finished tied for 5th place with a record of 5–4, just missing the playoffs. Lyttle returned to the nationals in 2014 playing second for Paul Pustovar, coming in 9th place with a 2–7 record.

For the 2014-2015 curling season, Lyttle formed a new team with Brandon Corbett, Derek Corbett, and Jared Wydysh. They had a successful 2014 Ontario Curling Tour season, winning the Roy Inch & Sons Service Experts Classic and qualifying at the Glendale Cash Spiel. Lyttle and Team Corbett proceeded to qualify for the 2015 United States Men's Curling Championship at the challenge round at the Granite Curling Club in Seattle. At the 2015 nationals, the Corbett team finished 4-5 in the round robin, putting them in a four way tie for the final playoff spot. The team defeated Korey Dropkin and Dean Gemmell in its two tiebreaker games, winning the first game on a fluke shot (See video). In the playoffs, Lyttle lost to Heath McCormick, leaving him and the team in 4th place.

In 2016, Lyttle, along with Team Corbett, qualified again for the nationals. At the 2016 United States Men's Curling Championship in Jacksonville, the team had a disappointing performance, finishing the week tied for 8th with a 3–6 win-loss record.

According to the World Curling Tour, Lyttle was moved to the vice position for the start of the 2016-2017 season.

Lyttle also played in the 2011 Pacific International Cup, winning the silver medal.

Over his years at nationals, Lyttle has developed a strong following for his stellar play despite an unconventional delivery. At the 2016 nationals he shot 90.4%, good for 3rd best in that year's field. Lyttle's high statistics have led many to consider him a legend in the sport of curling.

== Personal life ==
Lyttle is a software design engineer.

== Teams ==
Season	Skip	Third	Second	Lead	Events
2009–10	Wes Johnson	Leon Romaniuk	Paul Lyttle	Richard Maskel	2010 USMCC (5th)
2013–14	Paul Pustovar	Joseph Bonfoey	Paul Lyttle	Harold Rutan	2014 USMCC (9th)
2014–15	Brandon Corbett	Derek Corbett	Paul Lyttle	Jared Wydysh	2015 USMCC (4th)
2015–16	Brandon Corbett	Derek Corbett	Paul Lyttle	Jared Wydysh	2016 USMCC (8th)
2016–17	Brandon Corbett	Paul Lyttle	Derek Corbett	Jared Wydysh	
