= 2013 Continental Cup of Curling =

International curling competition

2013 World Financial Group Continental Cup of Curling
- Host city: Penticton, British Columbia, Canada
- Arena: South Okanagan Events Centre
- Dates: January 10–13
- Winner: Team North America
Score Breakdown
Discipline	NA	World
Women's Team Round 1	0.5	2.5
Mixed Doubles Round 1	1.5	1.5
Men's Team Round 1	2	1
Women's Team Round 2	2.5	0.5
Singles	4	2
Men's Team Round 2	2.5	0.5
Mixed Doubles Round 2	3	0
Women's Team Round 3	1.5	1.5
Men's Team Round 3	2	1
Skins Round 1	7	8
Skins Round 2	10.5	4.5
Total	37	23

The 2013 World Financial Group Continental Cup of Curling was held from January 10 to 13 at the South Okanagan Events Centre in Penticton, British Columbia, Canada. The Continental Cup, based on the Ryder Cup of golf, pitted teams from North America against teams from the rest of the world. The tournament featured team events, mixed doubles events, singles competitions, and skins competitions, and the brunt of available points was awarded in the skins competitions. TSN broadcast the event, as it had in previous years.

Team North America was represented by Canada Cup champions Jennifer Jones and Kevin Martin, Tournament of Hearts champion Heather Nedohin, Brier champion Glenn Howard, and the United States men's and women's champions Heath McCormick and Allison Pottinger, respectively. Team World was represented by reigning world champion Mirjam Ott, world silver medalist Margaretha Sigfridsson, four-time world junior champion Eve Muirhead, two-time world bronze medalist Niklas Edin, two-time world silver medalist Tom Brewster, and two-time European champion Thomas Ulsrud.

Team World entered the event as the defending champions, but were unseated by Team North America. Team World took an early lead in the first day of the event, but Team North America roared back in the next few days, dominating in the team, mixed doubles, and singles competitions to hold a large lead. Team North America clinched the cup in the second round of skins play after holding back a late Team World comeback, giving Team North America a 5–4 edge in the overall cup record. Team North America's win ensured that no defending champion to date would successfully defend its title from the previous Cup.

== Competition format ==
Six teams from North America and six teams representing the rest of the world play a series of games against each other in order to win points. The first side to win a majority of the points available wins the cup. Teams compete in four formats: team games, mixed doubles games, singles competitions, and skins games. Team games are regular curling games, with two teams of four playing against each other. Mixed doubles games involve two teams, each consisting of one male and one female, playing against each other. Mixed doubles teams use only six stones per end, one of which is positioned prior to the start of the end. This is in contrast to the eight stones per end used by teams of four in regular curling games. The singles competition involves two teams playing against each other. There are six types of shots contested in the singles competitions. Each curler from each team is assigned to throw at least one type of shot. Points are given based on how well the shot is made. After all of the shots have been thrown, the team with the most points wins the competition. Skins games involve two teams playing against each other, where the objective is to win skins by scoring two or more points with the hammer or stealing points without the hammer. The points for the skins games, which go toward the total points for the cup, are distributed throughout the game, and the teams earn these points by winning skins.

A new points system was implemented in the 2013 Continental Cup of Curling. The total of points available was 60 points, compared to the total of 400 points used in previous years. The mixed doubles, singles, and team games were worth one point each, and ties were worth one half point each to both teams. The skins games were worth a total of five points. All games were eight ends long, and there were no extra ends. Also, six mixed doubles games and six singles competition games were played, as before. However, there were eighteen team games instead of the previous twelve, and there were six skins games instead of the previous eight.

== Teams ==
The teams were selected from the top teams in each region. Six teams from each region will compete against each other in the competition. Four teams from Canada earn the right to represent Team North America by virtue of winning certain events, namely the Canada Cup of Curling and the Canadian National Championships (the Brier and the Tournament of Hearts). Two teams from the United States are chosen by the United States Curling Association to represent North America, and the teams representing Team World are selected by the World Curling Federation.

The teams in the table below have been announced as representatives of their respective regions.

Team	Skip	Third	Second	Lead	Locale
Team; North; America	Jennifer Jones	Kaitlyn Lawes	Jill Officer	Dawn Askin	(Canada) Winnipeg, Manitoba
Team; North; America	Heather Nedohin	Beth Iskiw	Jessica Mair	Laine Peters	(Canada) Edmonton, Alberta
Team; North; America	Allison Pottinger	Nicole Joraanstad	Natalie Nicholson	Tabitha Peterson	(United States) St. Paul, Minnesota
Team; North; America	Kevin Martin	John Morris	Marc Kennedy	Ben Hebert	(Canada) Edmonton, Alberta
Team; North; America	Glenn Howard	Wayne Middaugh	Brent Laing	Craig Savill	(Canada) Coldwater, Ontario
Team; North; America	Heath McCormick	Bill Stopera	Martin Sather	Dean Gemmell	(United States) Irvington, New York
Team; North; America	Coach: (Canada) Kelley Law, Captain: (Canada) Rick Lang				
Team; World	Eve Muirhead	Anna Sloan	Vicki Adams	Claire Hamilton	(Scotland) Stirling
Team; World	Maria Prytz (fourth)	Christina Bertrup	Maria Wennerström	Margaretha Sigfridsson (skip)	(Sweden) Umeå
Team; World	Mirjam Ott	Carmen Schäfer	Carmen Küng	Janine Greiner	(Switzerland) Davos
Team; World	Tom Brewster	Greg Drummond	Scott Andrews	Michael Goodfellow	(Scotland) Aberdeen
Team; World	Niklas Edin	Sebastian Kraupp	Fredrik Lindberg	Viktor Kjäll	(Sweden) Karlstad
Team; World	Thomas Ulsrud	Torger Nergård	Christoffer Svae	Håvard Vad Petersson	(Norway) Oslo
Team; World	Coach: (Scotland) David Hay, Captain: (Sweden) Peja Lindholm				

== Event summary ==
=== Day 1 ===
Team World and Team North America began the event with women's team play. Mirjam Ott and Allison Pottinger played a high-scoring game which resulted in a win for Ott, and Eve Muirhead scored an early lead over Heather Nedohin and held it to win another point for Team World. Jennifer Jones made a precise draw to tie her game with Margaretha Sigfridsson and secured a half-point for Team North America, averting a sweep by Team World.

Team World held a two-point lead coming into the first mixed doubles round, where they split the three points available with Team North America. The North American pair of John Morris and Kaitlyn Lawes dominated Team World's Niklas Edin and Christina Bertrup. Heather Nedohin made a game-saving shot with Dean Gemmell to tie their game with Michael Goodfellow and Eve Muirhead, and Christoffer Svae and Carmen Schäfer stole a win over Marc Kennedy and Allison Pottinger after Pottinger was light on a draw.

Team North America closed the two-point gap by one point in men's team play, where they won two of the three games. Both Niklas Edin of Team World and Kevin Martin of Team North America won close games against Heath McCormick and Tom Brewster, respectively, while Glenn Howard made a double-takeout in the last end to hold his lead and win the game over Thomas Ulsrud. At the end of the day, Team World led Team North America 5–4.

=== Day 2 ===
In the morning draw, women's team play saw Team North America turning the tables on Team World by winning two games and splitting the points for the third. Heather Nedohin held a slight lead over Margaretha Sigfridsson, who tried to win the game in the final end but fell short and tied the game. Jennifer Jones and Mirjam Ott played a back-and-forth game which saw Ott miss a double-takeout attempt for the win, allowing Jones to steal the point. Allison Pottinger stole three in the fifth end against Eve Muirhead and held the lead through the rest of the game, capping off the game with a four-point end.

The singles competition, similar to a skills competition in ice hockey, involved team members from each of the twelve teams attempting six types of shots. Team North America fared well in the singles competition, winning four of the six matchups and earning four points. On the women's side, the teams skipped by Allison Pottinger and Mirjam Ott scored the highest total of points at 18 points, while on the men's side, Glenn Howard's team scored the highest total of points at 22 points.

The evening draw, which consisted of men's team play, saw Team North America extending their lead to five points. Heath McCormick dominated against Thomas Ulsrud, who lost second Christoffer Svae in the middle of the game due to illness. Kevin Martin established an early lead in the first half of the game versus Niklas Edin and held his lead to win. Glenn Howard had a chance to make the draw a North America sweep, starting off with a small lead against Tom Brewster, but a mistake in the eighth end from Brent Laing led to a chance for Brewster to come back and tie the game, which he did. At the end of the day, Team North America led Team World 13–8.

=== Day 3 ===
The morning draw consisted of mixed doubles play, where Team North America dominated Team World and earned the first sweep of three points in the event. Heath McCormick and Jessica Mair dominated Sebastian Kraupp and Maria Prytz, stealing three ends en route to a six-point victory. Glenn Howard and Natalie Nicholson held an early lead over Greg Drummond and Anna Sloan after a four-point second end, but Drummond and Sloan came back to make it a close game. In the end, Howard and Nicholson scored two to win the game. Brent Laing and Jennifer Jones played a back-and-forth game with Torger Nergård and Carmen Küng, but retained control through most of the game and came out with the victory after Küng's last shot left Team North America having shot stone, effectively giving Laing and Jones the win.

In the afternoon draw, women's team play saw a split of the three available points. Mirjam Ott pushed out to an early lead against Heather Nedohin, and held her lead against a struggling Nedohin to win. Jennifer Jones played a back-and-forth game with Eve Muirhead, and won on a dramatic finish, tapping a buried stone to score a deuce in the final end. Allison Pottinger held an early lead over Margaretha Sigfridsson, but Sigfridsson rallied with the help of three stolen points and tied the game.

The evening draw saw Team North America extending their lead by one point. Heath McCormick and Tom Brewster played a relatively quick game, with McCormick winning on a draw in the final end. Kevin Martin scored a huge four-point end against Thomas Ulsrud and commanded the rest of the match to secure Team North America's second win. Glenn Howard came short in winning his match versus Niklas Edin, however, when a failed in-off shot in the sixth end led to a steal by Edin. Edin secured Team World's only full point in the draw with a double takeout. At the end of the day, Team North America led Team World 19½–10½.

=== Day 4 ===
The afternoon draw consisted of skins play. Allison Pottinger and Margaretha Sigfridsson played in the women's skins game. Pottinger held an early lead after four straight skins, but Sigfridsson capitalized on missed shots from Pottinger to win the last four skins and the game. Heath McCormick and Niklas Edin played in the men's skins game, where a series of carryovers saw Edin winning the last skin, worth three and a half points, and the game. A mixed team of John Morris, Beth Iskiw, Ben Hebert, and Jessica Mair played Tom Brewster, Anna Sloan, Scott Andrews, and Claire Hamilton in the mixed skins game. Morris, who skipped against Brewster, held control over the game and limited Brewster in scoring. Brewster won the last point on a draw to the button, giving Team World an 8–7 edge in the first round of skins play.

The evening draw also consisted of skins play. Jennifer Jones and Mirjam Ott played in the women's skins game, in which Jones dominated, scoring four skins and winning four points for Team North America. Glenn Howard and Thomas Ulsrud played in the men's skins game. Ulsrud played a fairly open game, forcing carryovers for five ends until a misfire from Ulsrud led to Howard making the cup-winning shot, scoring three points with a tap for two points. Ulsrud won the remaining points in the game on a draw to the button. A mixed team of Kevin Martin, Heather Nedohin, Marc Kennedy, and Laine Peters played Eve Muirhead, Greg Drummond, Vicki Adams, and Michael Goodfellow in the mixed skins game. Martin skipped against Muirhead and controlled most of the game, securing four points on four skins before Muirhead took the last skin. Team North America took a 10½–4½ point edge in the second round of skins play, giving them a CAD$13,000 bonus for winning the skins rounds.

The final score of the event was 37–23, and the winning team, Team North America, received a purse of CAD$52,000, CAD$2,000 per player, in addition to the skins bonus, while the losing team received a purse of CAD$26,000, CAD$1,000 per player.

== Events ==
All times listed are Pacific Standard Time. The draws for Thursday, Friday, and Saturday were released on Wednesday night, and the draws for Sunday were released on Saturday afternoon.

=== Thursday, January 10 ===
Women's team 8:30 am

Sheet A	1	2	3	4	5	6	7	8	Final	Points
North America (Pottinger)	0	0	3	0	1	0	3	0	7	0
World (Ott) 🔨	1	0	0	4	0	3	0	1	9	1

Sheet B	1	2	3	4	5	6	7	8	Final	Points
North America (Nedohin)	0	1	0	1	0	1	0	X	3	0
World (Muirhead) 🔨	3	0	1	0	2	0	2	X	8	1

Sheet C	1	2	3	4	5	6	7	8	Final	Points
North America (Jones) 🔨	0	1	0	1	0	2	0	2	6	½
World (Sigfridsson)	1	0	1	0	3	0	1	0	6	½

Mixed doubles 1:00 pm

Sheet A	1	2	3	4	5	6	7	8	Final	Points
North America (Kennedy/Pottinger)	1	1	0	2	0	3	0	0	7	0
World (Svae/Schäfer) 🔨	0	0	2	0	3	0	1	2	8	1

Sheet B	1	2	3	4	5	6	7	8	Final	Points
North America (Gemmell/Nedohin)	0	0	1	1	1	0	0	2	5	½
World (Goodfellow/Muirhead) 🔨	1	1	0	0	0	2	1	0	5	½

Sheet C	1	2	3	4	5	6	7	8	Final	Points
North America (Morris/Lawes) 🔨	2	1	0	1	2	0	3	1	10	1
World (Edin/Bertrup)	0	0	1	0	0	2	0	0	3	0

Men's team 6:30 pm

Sheet A	1	2	3	4	5	6	7	8	Final	Points
North America (McCormick) 🔨	2	0	2	0	2	0	1	0	7	0
World (Edin)	0	3	0	1	0	3	0	1	8	1

Sheet B	1	2	3	4	5	6	7	8	Final	Points
North America (Howard)	0	1	0	0	1	0	3	1	6	1
World (Ulsrud) 🔨	1	0	0	1	0	1	0	0	3	0

Sheet C	1	2	3	4	5	6	7	8	Final	Points
North America (Martin) 🔨	0	1	0	0	2	0	0	1	4	1
World (Brewster)	0	0	2	0	0	0	1	0	3	0

=== Friday, January 11 ===
Women's team 8:30 am

Sheet A	1	2	3	4	5	6	7	8	Final	Points
North America (Nedohin)	1	0	0	2	0	1	0	0	4	½
World (Sigfridsson) 🔨	0	2	0	0	1	0	0	1	4	½

Sheet B	1	2	3	4	5	6	7	8	Final	Points
North America (Jones)	0	1	1	0	1	0	2	1	6	1
World (Ott) 🔨	1	0	0	2	0	2	0	0	5	0

Sheet C	1	2	3	4	5	6	7	8	Final	Points
North America (Pottinger) 🔨	0	1	0	1	3	0	0	4	9	1
World (Muirhead)	0	0	2	0	0	0	2	0	4	0

Singles 1:00 pm

Sheet A	Runthrough	Button	Port	Raise	Hit-and-Roll	Double	Total	Points
North America (Nedohin)	0	4	3	5	5	0	17	1
World (Muirhead)	0	3	4	3	1	0	11	0

Sheet B	Runthrough	Button	Port	Raise	Hit-and-Roll	Double	Total	Points
North America (Jones)	0	1	5	1	4	0	11	0
World (Ott)	0	5	2	4	2	5	18	1

Sheet C	Runthrough	Button	Port	Raise	Hit-and-Roll	Double	Total	Points
North America (Pottinger)	5	0	5	3	1	4	18	1
World (Sigfridsson)	1	5	5	1	1	0	13	0

Sheet A	Runthrough	Button	Port	Raise	Hit-and-Roll	Double	Total	Points
North America (McCormick)	0	5	0	1	2	0	8	0
World (Brewster)	3	3	2	4	1	1	14	1

Sheet B	Runthrough	Button	Port	Raise	Hit-and-Roll	Double	Total	Points
North America (Howard)	3	5	5	4	4	1	22	1
World (Ulsrud)	0	4	4	5	4	0	17	0

Sheet C	Runthrough	Button	Port	Raise	Hit-and-Roll	Double	Total	Points
North America (Martin)	1	3	5	4	4	0	17	1
World (Edin)	0	4	5	3	1	0	13	0

Men's team 6:30 pm

Sheet A	1	2	3	4	5	6	7	8	Final	Points
North America (Howard) 🔨	2	0	1	0	1	0	1	0	5	½
World (Brewster)	0	1	0	1	0	1	0	2	5	½

Sheet B	1	2	3	4	5	6	7	8	Final	Points
North America (Martin) 🔨	2	0	0	3	0	0	1	X	6	1
World (Edin)	0	1	0	0	0	2	0	X	3	0

Sheet C	1	2	3	4	5	6	7	8	Final	Points
North America (McCormick) 🔨	3	0	1	2	0	1	1	X	8	1
World (Ulsrud)	0	2	0	0	1	0	0	X	3	0

=== Saturday, January 12 ===
Mixed doubles 9:00 am

Sheet A	1	2	3	4	5	6	7	8	Final	Points
North America (Howard/Nicholson) 🔨	0	4	0	0	0	1	0	2	7	1
World (Drummond/Sloan)	1	0	1	1	1	0	2	0	6	0

Sheet B	1	2	3	4	5	6	7	8	Final	Points
North America (Laing/Jones)	0	0	3	0	2	1	0	1	7	1
World (Nergård/Küng) 🔨	1	1	0	2	0	0	1	0	5	0

Sheet C	1	2	3	4	5	6	7	8	Final	Points
North America (McCormick/Mair) 🔨	2	1	1	0	2	3	0	X	9	1
World (Kraupp/Prytz)	0	0	0	2	0	0	1	X	3	0

Women's team 1:30 pm

Sheet A	1	2	3	4	5	6	7	8	Final	Points
North America (Jones) 🔨	0	1	0	1	1	0	0	2	5	1
World (Muirhead)	0	0	2	0	0	1	1	0	4	0

Sheet B	1	2	3	4	5	6	7	8	Final	Points
North America (Pottinger) 🔨	0	2	2	0	0	0	1	0	5	½
World (Sigfridsson)	0	0	0	1	1	2	0	1	5	½

Sheet C	1	2	3	4	5	6	7	8	Final	Points
North America (Nedohin)	0	0	1	0	0	0	1	X	2	0
World (Ott) 🔨	2	2	0	1	1	0	0	X	6	1

Men's team 6:30 pm

Sheet A	1	2	3	4	5	6	7	8	Final	Points
North America (Martin) 🔨	2	0	4	0	1	1	0	X	8	1
World (Ulsrud)	0	2	0	0	0	0	1	X	3	0

Sheet B	1	2	3	4	5	6	7	8	Final	Points
North America (McCormick) 🔨	0	1	0	2	0	0	0	1	4	1
World (Brewster)	0	0	1	0	0	1	1	0	3	0

Sheet C	1	2	3	4	5	6	7	8	Final	Points
North America (Howard) 🔨	1	0	0	1	0	0	2	0	4	0
World (Edin)	0	0	1	0	2	1	0	1	5	1

=== Sunday, January 13 ===
Skins 1:00 pm

Values (points)	½	½	½	½	½	½	1	1	5
Sheet A	1	2	3	4	5	6	7	8	Total
North America (McCormick)		0	X		0		0		1½
World (Edin) 🔨	0			0		0		X	3½

Values (points)	½	½	½	½	½	½	1	1		5
Sheet B	1	2	3	4	5	6	7	8	Button	Total
North America (Morris/Iskiw/Hebert/Mair)	X		X		X		X			3½
World (Brewster/Sloan/Andrews/Hamilton) 🔨		0		X		0		0	X	1½

Values (points)	½	½	½	½	½	½	1	1	5
Sheet C	1	2	3	4	5	6	7	8	Total
North America (Pottinger)	X	X	X	X					2
World (Sigfridsson) 🔨					0	X	X	X	3

Skins 5:00 pm

Values (points)	½	½	½	½	½	½	1	1	5
Sheet A	1	2	3	4	5	6	7	8	Total
North America (Jones)	X		X			X		X	4
World (Ott) 🔨		0		0	X		0		1

Values (points)	½	½	½	½	½	½	1	1	5
Sheet B	1	2	3	4	5	6	7	8	Total
North America (Martin/Nedohin/Kennedy/Peters)		X		X		X	X		3½
World (Muirhead/Drummond/Adams/Goodfellow) 🔨	0		X		0			X	1½

Values (points)	½	½	½	½	½	½	1	1		5
Sheet C	1	2	3	4	5	6	7	8	Button	Total
North America (Howard)		0		0		X		0		3
World (Ulsrud) 🔨	0		0		0		0		X	2

== Statistics ==
The statistics for team play, including team skins play, are listed below. The percentages are calculated for each player by rating their shots in each game. Each shot the player attempts is scored out of four based on how well the shot is made.

=== Player percentages ===
==== Men ====
Leads	%
(Scotland) Michael Goodfellow	91
(Canada) Craig Savill	91
(Canada) Ben Hebert	90
(Norway) Håvard Vad Petersson	86
(Sweden) Viktor Kjäll	82
(United States) Dean Gemmell	82

Seconds	%
(Canada) Marc Kennedy	96
(Scotland) Scott Andrews	88
(Canada) Brent Laing	87
(Norway) Christoffer Svae	85
(United States) Martin Sather	76
(Sweden) Fredrik Lindberg	72

Thirds	%
(Canada) Wayne Middaugh	91
(Canada) John Morris	90
(Scotland) Greg Drummond	85
(Norway) Torger Nergård	84
(United States) Bill Stopera	84
(Sweden) Sebastian Kraupp	76

Skips	%
(Canada) Kevin Martin	90
(Scotland) Tom Brewster	86
(Canada) Glenn Howard	80
(Sweden) Niklas Edin	80
(Norway) Thomas Ulsrud	78
(United States) Heath McCormick	75

==== Women ====
Leads	%
(Sweden) Margaretha Sigfridsson	94
(United States) Tabitha Peterson	91
(Scotland) Claire Hamilton	89
(Canada) Laine Peters	89
(Canada) Dawn Askin	88
(Switzerland) Janine Greiner	81

Seconds	%
(Canada) Jessica Mair	88
(Canada) Jill Officer	87
(Scotland) Vicki Adams	85
(Sweden) Maria Wennerström	82
(Switzerland) Carmen Küng	81
(United States) Natalie Nicholson	80

Thirds	%
(Scotland) Anna Sloan	86
(Switzerland) Carmen Schäfer	83
(Canada) Kaitlyn Lawes	82
(Sweden) Christina Bertrup	78
(United States) Nicole Joraanstad	76
(Canada) Beth Iskiw	73

Skips	%
(Scotland) Eve Muirhead	86
(Switzerland) Mirjam Ott	79
(Canada) Jennifer Jones	78
(United States) Allison Pottinger	76
(Canada) Heather Nedohin	72
(Sweden) Maria Prytz	71

=== Team percentages ===
==== Men ====
Team	%
(Canada) Kevin Martin	91
(Scotland) Tom Brewster	88
(Canada) Glenn Howard	87
(Norway) Thomas Ulsrud	84
(United States) Heath McCormick	79
(Sweden) Niklas Edin	77

==== Women ====
Team	%
(Scotland) Eve Muirhead	87
(Canada) Jennifer Jones	84
(Sweden) Margaretha Sigfridsson	81
(Switzerland) Mirjam Ott	81
(United States) Allison Pottinger	81
(Canada) Heather Nedohin	81

=== Perfect games ===
==== Women ====
Player	Team	Position	Shots	Opponent
Margaretha Sigfridsson	(Sweden) Margaretha Sigfridsson	Lead	16	(Canada) Heather Nedohin
Margaretha Sigfridsson	(Sweden) Margaretha Sigfridsson	Lead	16	(United States) Allison Pottinger
Tabitha Peterson	(United States) Allison Pottinger	Lead	16	(Sweden) Margaretha Sigfridsson
