= Mark Lazar =

American curler

- Curler
- Born: July 19, 1977 (age 49); Toledo, Ohio, U.S.

Team
- Skip: Craig Brown
- Third: Bill Stopera
- Second: Dean Gemmell
- Lead: Mark Lazar

Mark Lazar (born July 19, 1977) is an American curler and curling coach. He competed in the 2005 United States Olympic Curling Trials. He curls out of the Detroit Curling Club. He coached Team Stopera to three United States Junior Championships and a silver medal at the 2017 World Junior Championships.

== Playing career ==
While attending Bowling Green University in his freshman year, Lazar took a 1 credit gym class in curling. He joined the Bowling Green Curling Club a year after and joined a club league and the university curling league.

Lazar participated in the 2001, 2002, and 2003 United States Men's Curling Championships. In 2005 Lazar was lead for the Don Barcome Jr. rink at the United States Olympic Curling Trials, where his team finished 10th. He also participated in the 2006 Men's Nationals, finishing 9th.

Under skip Bryan Wight, he participated in the 2011 United States Men's Curling Championship qualifiers, where he made it to the challenge round (one level under the finals). His team finished tied for last in the challenge round.

== Coaching career ==
After almost two decades competing on the ice, Lazar moved to a coaching role to begin the 2016-2017 curling season. Lazar joined Team Stopera, a newly formed group within the US Junior High Performance Program. The team consisted of Andrew Stopera at skip, Luc Violette at third, Ben Richardson at second, and Graem Fenson at lead. The team had instant success under Lazar's tutelage, winning the 2017 Junior Nationals and earning the silver medal at the 2017 Worlds. Lazar remained with the team in its subsequent two seasons, repeating as a national champion coach in both 2018 and 2019. The team never experienced the same success at the worlds as it did in its first season, finishing 4th in 2018 and 5th in 2019. Lazar also coached the team to an 8th-place finish at the 2019 Winter World University Games.

After Stopera aged out and the team saw its first major change in three years following the 2019 season, Lazar left Team Stopera to join Team Farrell as coach. A women's team in the Junior High Performance Program, Team Farrell consisted of Cora Farrell at skip, Caiti Flannery at fourth, Leah Yavarow at third, Allison Howell at lead, and Rebecca Miles at fifth. The team competed at the 2019 World Junior-B Championships in Lohja, Finland, the qualifying tournament for the World Junior Curling Championships. Lazar and the team were unable to qualify the US for the worlds, finishing in 5th place. At the 2020 Junior Nationals, the team lost the final to Team Strouse.

In the summer of 2020, it was announced that Lazar would be joining Team Sinclair as coach. The team consisted of Jamie Sinclair at skip, Monica Walker at third, Cora Farrell at second, and Elizabeth Cousins at lead.

Currently, he coaches the Korey Dropkin rink.

== Teams ==
Season	Skip	Third	Second	Lead	Events
2005–06	Wes Johnson	Leon Romaniuk	Brandon Way	Mark Lazar	2005 USOCT
2009–10	Bryan Wight	Michael Moore	Joey Bonfoey	Mark Lazar	2010 USOCT
2010–11	Bryan Wight	Michael Moore	Joel Dietz	Mark Lazar	2011 USMCR
2011–12	Eric Fenson	Trevor Andrews	Quentin Way	Mark Lazar	2012 USNCC
2012–13	Mike Farbelow	Kevin Deeren	Kraig Deeren	Mark Lazar	2013 USNCC
2013–14	Mike Farbelow	Kevin Deeren	Kraig Deeren	Mark Lazar	
2014–15	Dean Gemmell	Bill Stopera	Martin Sather	Mark Lazar	2015 USNCC
2015–16	Heath McCormick	Bill Stopera	Dean Gemmell	Mark Lazar	2016 USNCC
2016–17	Bill Stopera	Dean Gemmell		Mark Lazar	
