= 2015 United States Men's Curling Championship =

- Host city: Kalamazoo, Michigan
- Arena: Wings Stadium
- Dates: February 14–21
- Winner: (Minnesota) John Shuster
- Curling club: Duluth CC, Duluth, Minnesota
- Skip: John Shuster
- Third: Tyler George
- Second: Matt Hamilton
- Lead: John Landsteiner
- Finalist: (Minnesota) Craig Brown

The 2015 United States Men's Curling Championship was held from February 14 to 21 at the Wings Stadium in Kalamazoo, Michigan. It was held in conjunction with the 2015 United States Women's Curling Championship. The winning John Shuster rink went on to represent the United States at the 2015 Ford World Men's Curling Championship in Halifax, Nova Scotia.

== Teams ==
Ten teams participated in the 2015 national championship. The teams are listed as follows:

| Skip | Third | Second | Lead | Alternate | Locale | Qualification method |
|---|---|---|---|---|---|---|
| Craig Brown | Kroy Nernberger | Jared Zezel | Sean Beighton | Alex Leichter | Blaine, Minnesota | High Performance Program committee selection |
| Korey Dropkin | Tom Howell | Mark Fenner | Andrew Stopera | Luc Violette | Blaine, Minnesota | High Performance Program committee selection |
| Heath McCormick | Chris Plys | Joe Polo | Colin Hufman | Ryan Brunt | Blaine, Minnesota | Order of Merit |
| John Shuster | Tyler George | Matt Hamilton | John Landsteiner | Trevor Host | Duluth, Minnesota | Order of Merit |
| Brandon Corbett | Derek Corbett | Paul Lyttle | Jared Wydysh | Mark Hartman | (New York (state)) Rochester, New York | Challenge Round |
| Dean Gemmell | Bill Stopera | Martin Sather | Mark Lazar | | (New York (state)) New York, New York | Challenge Round |
| Brady Clark | Greg Persinger | Nick Myers | Matt Birklid | Philip Tilker | (Washington (state)) Seattle, Washington | Challenge Round |
| Mark Haluptzok | Josh Bahr | Aaron Wald | Jon Chandler | | Bemidji, Minnesota | Challenge Round |
| Paul Pustovar | Chris Bond | Sam Galey | Duane Rutan | | (Washington (state)) Seattle, Washington | Challenge Round |
| Ethan Meyers | Quinn Evenson | Steven Szemple | William Pryor | | Duluth, Minnesota | National junior champions |

== Round-robin standings ==
Final round-robin standings

Key
| Teams to playoffs |
| Teams to tiebreakers |

| Skip | W | L | PF | PA | Ends won | Ends Lost | Blank ends | Stolen ends | Shot pct. |
|---|---|---|---|---|---|---|---|---|---|
| (Minnesota) John Shuster | 8 | 1 | 69 | 46 | 43 | 31 | 11 | 11 | 80% |
| (Minnesota) Craig Brown | 7 | 2 | 70 | 41 | 36 | 34 | 12 | 6 | 87% |
| (Minnesota) Heath McCormick | 6 | 3 | 56 | 50 | 35 | 31 | 12 | 10 | 84% |
| (New York (state)) Brandon Corbett | 4 | 5 | 47 | 50 | 32 | 34 | 17 | 10 | 79% |
| (Minnesota) Korey Dropkin | 4 | 5 | 49 | 43 | 32 | 30 | 12 | 10 | 80% |
| (New York (state)) Dean Gemmell | 4 | 5 | 48 | 55 | 27 | 35 | 10 | 5 | 77% |
| (Washington (state)) Paul Pustovar | 4 | 5 | 56 | 56 | 42 | 33 | 9 | 20 | 77% |
| (Washington (state)) Brady Clark | 3 | 6 | 42 | 50 | 29 | 32 | 12 | 6 | 78% |
| (Minnesota) Mark Haluptzok | 3 | 6 | 48 | 70 | 35 | 41 | 7 | 7 | 75% |
| (Minnesota) Ethan Meyers | 2 | 7 | 42 | 66 | 25 | 35 | 14 | 3 | 72% |

== Round-robin results ==
All draw times listed in Eastern Standard Time (UTC−5).

=== Draw 1 ===
Saturday, February 14, 8:30 pm

| Sheet 1 | 1 | 2 | 3 | 4 | 5 | 6 | 7 | 8 | 9 | 10 | Final |
|---|---|---|---|---|---|---|---|---|---|---|---|
| (Washington (state)) Brady Clark | 1 | 0 | 0 | 1 | 0 | 0 | 1 | 0 | X | X | 3 |
| (Washington (state)) Paul Pustovar | 0 | 2 | 1 | 0 | 1 | 3 | 0 | 2 | X | X | 9 |

| Sheet 2 | 1 | 2 | 3 | 4 | 5 | 6 | 7 | 8 | 9 | 10 | Final |
|---|---|---|---|---|---|---|---|---|---|---|---|
| (Minnesota) John Shuster | 2 | 1 | 0 | 3 | 0 | 1 | 0 | 1 | 3 | X | 11 |
| (Minnesota) Mark Haluptzok | 0 | 0 | 1 | 0 | 1 | 0 | 2 | 0 | 0 | X | 4 |

| Sheet 3 | 1 | 2 | 3 | 4 | 5 | 6 | 7 | 8 | 9 | 10 | Final |
|---|---|---|---|---|---|---|---|---|---|---|---|
| (Minnesota) Ethan Meyers | 0 | 1 | 0 | 0 | 0 | 1 | X | X | X | X | 2 |
| (New York (state)) Dean Gemmell | 2 | 0 | 0 | 3 | 2 | 0 | X | X | X | X | 7 |

| Sheet 4 | 1 | 2 | 3 | 4 | 5 | 6 | 7 | 8 | 9 | 10 | Final |
|---|---|---|---|---|---|---|---|---|---|---|---|
| (New York (state)) Brandon Corbett | 1 | 1 | 0 | 2 | 1 | 0 | 1 | 0 | 3 | X | 9 |
| (Minnesota) Korey Dropkin | 0 | 0 | 2 | 0 | 0 | 2 | 0 | 0 | 0 | X | 4 |

| Sheet 5 | 1 | 2 | 3 | 4 | 5 | 6 | 7 | 8 | 9 | 10 | Final |
|---|---|---|---|---|---|---|---|---|---|---|---|
| (Minnesota) Craig Brown | 3 | 0 | 2 | 0 | 1 | 0 | 1 | 3 | X | X | 10 |
| (Minnesota) Heath McCormick | 0 | 1 | 0 | 1 | 0 | 1 | 0 | 0 | X | X | 3 |

=== Draw 2 ===
Sunday, February 15, 12:00 pm

| Sheet 1 | 1 | 2 | 3 | 4 | 5 | 6 | 7 | 8 | 9 | 10 | Final |
|---|---|---|---|---|---|---|---|---|---|---|---|
| (Minnesota) Heath McCormick | 3 | 0 | 2 | 0 | 0 | 1 | 1 | X | X | X | 7 |
| (New York (state)) Dean Gemmell | 0 | 1 | 0 | 1 | 0 | 0 | 0 | X | X | X | 2 |

| Sheet 2 | 1 | 2 | 3 | 4 | 5 | 6 | 7 | 8 | 9 | 10 | Final |
|---|---|---|---|---|---|---|---|---|---|---|---|
| (Minnesota) Craig Brown | 0 | 0 | 0 | 0 | 2 | 0 | 4 | 0 | 3 | X | 9 |
| (Washington (state)) Paul Pustovar | 0 | 2 | 0 | 0 | 0 | 1 | 0 | 1 | 0 | X | 4 |

| Sheet 3 | 1 | 2 | 3 | 4 | 5 | 6 | 7 | 8 | 9 | 10 | Final |
|---|---|---|---|---|---|---|---|---|---|---|---|
| (Minnesota) Korey Dropkin | 0 | 3 | 0 | 0 | 1 | 0 | 0 | 1 | 1 | 0 | 6 |
| (Minnesota) Mark Haluptzok | 3 | 0 | 1 | 1 | 0 | 1 | 0 | 0 | 0 | 1 | 7 |

| Sheet 4 | 1 | 2 | 3 | 4 | 5 | 6 | 7 | 8 | 9 | 10 | 11 | Final |
|---|---|---|---|---|---|---|---|---|---|---|---|---|
| (Minnesota) Ethan Meyers | 0 | 0 | 0 | 2 | 0 | 2 | 0 | 0 | 0 | 2 | 0 | 6 |
| (Minnesota) John Shuster | 0 | 0 | 3 | 0 | 1 | 0 | 0 | 1 | 1 | 0 | 1 | 7 |

| Sheet 5 | 1 | 2 | 3 | 4 | 5 | 6 | 7 | 8 | 9 | 10 | Final |
|---|---|---|---|---|---|---|---|---|---|---|---|
| (New York (state)) Brandon Corbett | 0 | 2 | 0 | 0 | 2 | 0 | 0 | 0 | 0 | 1 | 5 |
| (Washington (state)) Brady Clark | 0 | 0 | 1 | 0 | 0 | 0 | 3 | 0 | 0 | 0 | 4 |

=== Draw 3 ===
Sunday, February 15, 8:00 pm

| Sheet 1 | 1 | 2 | 3 | 4 | 5 | 6 | 7 | 8 | 9 | 10 | Final |
|---|---|---|---|---|---|---|---|---|---|---|---|
| (Minnesota) Ethan Meyers | 1 | 0 | 3 | 0 | 0 | 2 | 0 | 0 | 2 | 0 | 8 |
| (Minnesota) Mark Haluptzok | 0 | 3 | 0 | 1 | 1 | 0 | 0 | 2 | 0 | 2 | 9 |

| Sheet 2 | 1 | 2 | 3 | 4 | 5 | 6 | 7 | 8 | 9 | 10 | Final |
|---|---|---|---|---|---|---|---|---|---|---|---|
| (New York (state)) Dean Gemmell | 0 | 0 | 2 | 0 | 3 | 1 | 0 | 0 | 0 | 1 | 7 |
| (New York (state)) Brandon Corbett | 1 | 0 | 0 | 2 | 0 | 0 | 1 | 1 | 1 | 0 | 6 |

| Sheet 3 | 1 | 2 | 3 | 4 | 5 | 6 | 7 | 8 | 9 | 10 | Final |
|---|---|---|---|---|---|---|---|---|---|---|---|
| (Minnesota) John Shuster | 0 | 2 | 1 | 0 | 2 | 0 | 0 | 0 | 4 | X | 9 |
| (Minnesota) Heath McCormick | 0 | 0 | 0 | 2 | 0 | 2 | 0 | 1 | 0 | X | 5 |

| Sheet 4 | 1 | 2 | 3 | 4 | 5 | 6 | 7 | 8 | 9 | 10 | 11 | Final |
|---|---|---|---|---|---|---|---|---|---|---|---|---|
| (Minnesota) Craig Brown | 0 | 1 | 0 | 0 | 1 | 0 | 0 | 2 | 1 | 0 | 2 | 7 |
| (Washington (state)) Brady Clark | 1 | 0 | 0 | 1 | 0 | 2 | 0 | 0 | 0 | 1 | 0 | 5 |

| Sheet 5 | 1 | 2 | 3 | 4 | 5 | 6 | 7 | 8 | 9 | 10 | Final |
|---|---|---|---|---|---|---|---|---|---|---|---|
| (Minnesota) Korey Dropkin | 2 | 0 | 0 | 0 | 2 | 1 | 1 | 0 | 1 | X | 7 |
| (Washington (state)) Paul Pustovar | 0 | 0 | 1 | 1 | 0 | 0 | 0 | 1 | 0 | X | 3 |

=== Draw 4 ===
Monday, February 16, 12:00 pm

| Sheet 1 | 1 | 2 | 3 | 4 | 5 | 6 | 7 | 8 | 9 | 10 | 11 | Final |
|---|---|---|---|---|---|---|---|---|---|---|---|---|
| (Washington (state)) Paul Pustovar | 1 | 1 | 1 | 0 | 1 | 0 | 0 | 1 | 0 | 0 | 1 | 6 |
| (Minnesota) John Shuster | 0 | 0 | 0 | 1 | 0 | 1 | 2 | 0 | 0 | 1 | 0 | 5 |

| Sheet 2 | 1 | 2 | 3 | 4 | 5 | 6 | 7 | 8 | 9 | 10 | Final |
|---|---|---|---|---|---|---|---|---|---|---|---|
| (Washington (state)) Brady Clark | 0 | 0 | 0 | 0 | X | X | X | X | X | X | 0 |
| (Minnesota) Korey Dropkin | 1 | 1 | 1 | 4 | X | X | X | X | X | X | 7 |

| Sheet 3 | 1 | 2 | 3 | 4 | 5 | 6 | 7 | 8 | 9 | 10 | Final |
|---|---|---|---|---|---|---|---|---|---|---|---|
| (Minnesota) Craig Brown | 2 | 3 | 1 | 0 | 0 | 0 | 1 | 0 | 0 | X | 7 |
| (New York (state)) Brandon Corbett | 0 | 0 | 0 | 2 | 1 | 0 | 0 | 0 | 1 | X | 4 |

| Sheet 4 | 1 | 2 | 3 | 4 | 5 | 6 | 7 | 8 | 9 | 10 | Final |
|---|---|---|---|---|---|---|---|---|---|---|---|
| (New York (state)) Dean Gemmell | 4 | 0 | 1 | 0 | 2 | 0 | 2 | 0 | X | X | 9 |
| (Minnesota) Mark Haluptzok | 0 | 2 | 0 | 1 | 0 | 1 | 0 | 1 | X | X | 5 |

| Sheet 5 | 1 | 2 | 3 | 4 | 5 | 6 | 7 | 8 | 9 | 10 | Final |
|---|---|---|---|---|---|---|---|---|---|---|---|
| (Minnesota) Heath McCormick | 0 | 2 | 0 | 4 | 0 | 2 | X | X | X | X | 8 |
| (Minnesota) Ethan Meyers | 2 | 0 | 1 | 0 | 0 | 0 | X | X | X | X | 3 |

=== Draw 5 ===
Monday, February 16, 8:00 pm

| Sheet 1 | 1 | 2 | 3 | 4 | 5 | 6 | 7 | 8 | 9 | 10 | Final |
|---|---|---|---|---|---|---|---|---|---|---|---|
| (Minnesota) Korey Dropkin | 2 | 0 | 2 | 3 | 2 | X | X | X | X | X | 9 |
| (Minnesota) Ethan Meyers | 0 | 1 | 0 | 0 | 0 | X | X | X | X | X | 1 |

| Sheet 2 | 1 | 2 | 3 | 4 | 5 | 6 | 7 | 8 | 9 | 10 | Final |
|---|---|---|---|---|---|---|---|---|---|---|---|
| (New York (state)) Brandon Corbett | 0 | 0 | 0 | 1 | 0 | 0 | X | X | X | X | 1 |
| (Minnesota) John Shuster | 2 | 0 | 1 | 0 | 3 | 1 | X | X | X | X | 7 |

| Sheet 3 | 1 | 2 | 3 | 4 | 5 | 6 | 7 | 8 | 9 | 10 | Final |
|---|---|---|---|---|---|---|---|---|---|---|---|
| (New York (state)) Dean Gemmell | 0 | 0 | 0 | 0 | X | X | X | X | X | X | 0 |
| (Washington (state)) Brady Clark | 2 | 2 | 3 | 1 | X | X | X | X | X | X | 8 |

| Sheet 4 | 1 | 2 | 3 | 4 | 5 | 6 | 7 | 8 | 9 | 10 | Final |
|---|---|---|---|---|---|---|---|---|---|---|---|
| (Washington (state)) Paul Pustovar | 0 | 0 | 2 | 0 | 0 | 0 | 0 | 1 | 1 | 1 | 5 |
| (Minnesota) Heath McCormick | 0 | 2 | 0 | 1 | 2 | 0 | 1 | 0 | 0 | 0 | 6 |

| Sheet 5 | 1 | 2 | 3 | 4 | 5 | 6 | 7 | 8 | 9 | 10 | 11 | Final |
|---|---|---|---|---|---|---|---|---|---|---|---|---|
| (Minnesota) Mark Haluptzok | 0 | 1 | 0 | 2 | 0 | 1 | 0 | 1 | 0 | 0 | 1 | 6 |
| (Minnesota) Craig Brown | 1 | 0 | 2 | 0 | 0 | 0 | 1 | 0 | 0 | 1 | 0 | 5 |

=== Draw 6 ===
Tuesday, February 17, 3:00 pm

| Sheet 1 | 1 | 2 | 3 | 4 | 5 | 6 | 7 | 8 | 9 | 10 | Final |
|---|---|---|---|---|---|---|---|---|---|---|---|
| (New York (state)) Dean Gemmell | 1 | 0 | 0 | 0 | 1 | 0 | 1 | 0 | X | X | 3 |
| (Minnesota) Craig Brown | 0 | 3 | 0 | 2 | 0 | 1 | 0 | 2 | X | X | 8 |

| Sheet 2 | 1 | 2 | 3 | 4 | 5 | 6 | 7 | 8 | 9 | 10 | Final |
|---|---|---|---|---|---|---|---|---|---|---|---|
| (Minnesota) Heath McCormick | 0 | 0 | 0 | 2 | 0 | 1 | 0 | 1 | 1 | 0 | 5 |
| (Washington (state)) Brady Clark | 0 | 0 | 3 | 0 | 1 | 0 | 2 | 0 | 0 | 1 | 7 |

| Sheet 3 | 1 | 2 | 3 | 4 | 5 | 6 | 7 | 8 | 9 | 10 | Final |
|---|---|---|---|---|---|---|---|---|---|---|---|
| (Washington (state)) Paul Pustovar | 1 | 0 | 2 | 0 | 1 | 1 | 1 | 1 | 0 | 0 | 7 |
| (Minnesota) Quinn Evenson | 0 | 0 | 0 | 4 | 0 | 0 | 0 | 0 | 3 | 1 | 8 |

| Sheet 4 | 1 | 2 | 3 | 4 | 5 | 6 | 7 | 8 | 9 | 10 | Final |
|---|---|---|---|---|---|---|---|---|---|---|---|
| (Minnesota) Mark Haluptzok | 0 | 1 | 0 | 2 | 0 | 0 | 1 | 0 | 0 | X | 4 |
| (New York (state)) Brandon Corbett | 1 | 0 | 0 | 0 | 2 | 0 | 0 | 2 | 2 | X | 7 |

| Sheet 5 | 1 | 2 | 3 | 4 | 5 | 6 | 7 | 8 | 9 | 10 | Final |
|---|---|---|---|---|---|---|---|---|---|---|---|
| (Minnesota) John Shuster | 1 | 0 | 1 | 0 | 2 | 0 | 0 | 0 | 0 | 2 | 6 |
| (Minnesota) Korey Dropkin | 0 | 1 | 0 | 2 | 0 | 0 | 0 | 1 | 1 | 0 | 5 |

=== Draw 7 ===
Wednesday, February 18, 8:00 am

| Sheet 1 | 1 | 2 | 3 | 4 | 5 | 6 | 7 | 8 | 9 | 10 | Final |
|---|---|---|---|---|---|---|---|---|---|---|---|
| (Minnesota) Mark Haluptzok | 0 | 0 | 1 | 0 | 1 | 0 | 0 | 0 | 2 | X | 4 |
| (Washington (state)) Brady Clark | 1 | 1 | 0 | 2 | 0 | 0 | 2 | 1 | 0 | X | 7 |

| Sheet 2 | 1 | 2 | 3 | 4 | 5 | 6 | 7 | 8 | 9 | 10 | Final |
|---|---|---|---|---|---|---|---|---|---|---|---|
| (Washington (state)) Paul Pustovar | 0 | 2 | 0 | 0 | 2 | 1 | 1 | 0 | 0 | X | 6 |
| (New York (state)) Dean Gemmell | 3 | 0 | 3 | 1 | 0 | 0 | 0 | 1 | 2 | X | 10 |

| Sheet 3 | 1 | 2 | 3 | 4 | 5 | 6 | 7 | 8 | 9 | 10 | Final |
|---|---|---|---|---|---|---|---|---|---|---|---|
| (Minnesota) Heath McCormick | 0 | 0 | 2 | 0 | 2 | 1 | 0 | 3 | X | X | 8 |
| (Minnesota) Korey Dropkin | 0 | 0 | 0 | 1 | 0 | 0 | 2 | 0 | X | X | 3 |

| Sheet 4 | 1 | 2 | 3 | 4 | 5 | 6 | 7 | 8 | 9 | 10 | Final |
|---|---|---|---|---|---|---|---|---|---|---|---|
| (Minnesota) John Shuster | 1 | 0 | 1 | 2 | 0 | 1 | 0 | 2 | 0 | 1 | 8 |
| (Minnesota) Craig Brown | 0 | 2 | 0 | 0 | 2 | 0 | 1 | 0 | 2 | 0 | 7 |

| Sheet 5 | 1 | 2 | 3 | 4 | 5 | 6 | 7 | 8 | 9 | 10 | Final |
|---|---|---|---|---|---|---|---|---|---|---|---|
| (Minnesota) Ethan Meyers | 0 | 0 | 1 | 0 | 0 | 0 | 0 | 1 | 1 | 1 | 4 |
| (New York (state)) Brandon Corbett | 1 | 0 | 0 | 0 | 2 | 0 | 2 | 0 | 0 | 0 | 5 |

=== Draw 8 ===
Wednesday, February 18, 4:00 pm

| Sheet 1 | 1 | 2 | 3 | 4 | 5 | 6 | 7 | 8 | 9 | 10 | Final |
|---|---|---|---|---|---|---|---|---|---|---|---|
| (New York (state)) Brandon Corbett | 0 | 2 | 0 | 0 | 0 | 1 | 0 | 0 | 1 | 0 | 4 |
| (Minnesota) Heath McCormick | 1 | 0 | 2 | 0 | 1 | 0 | 0 | 1 | 0 | 1 | 6 |

| Sheet 2 | 1 | 2 | 3 | 4 | 5 | 6 | 7 | 8 | 9 | 10 | Final |
|---|---|---|---|---|---|---|---|---|---|---|---|
| (Minnesota) Ethan Meyers | 0 | 1 | 0 | 2 | 0 | 1 | 0 | X | X | X | 4 |
| (Minnesota) Craig Brown | 0 | 0 | 2 | 0 | 2 | 0 | 7 | X | X | X | 11 |

| Sheet 3 | 1 | 2 | 3 | 4 | 5 | 6 | 7 | 8 | 9 | 10 | Final |
|---|---|---|---|---|---|---|---|---|---|---|---|
| (Washington (state)) Brady Clark | 0 | 1 | 1 | 0 | 1 | 0 | 0 | 0 | 2 | X | 5 |
| (Minnesota) John Shuster | 2 | 0 | 0 | 2 | 0 | 1 | 1 | 1 | 0 | X | 7 |

| Sheet 4 | 1 | 2 | 3 | 4 | 5 | 6 | 7 | 8 | 9 | 10 | Final |
|---|---|---|---|---|---|---|---|---|---|---|---|
| (Minnesota) Korey Dropkin | 0 | 1 | 0 | 2 | 0 | 0 | 0 | 1 | 0 | 0 | 4 |
| (New York (state)) Dean Gemmell | 1 | 0 | 1 | 0 | 0 | 0 | 0 | 0 | 1 | 0 | 3 |

| Sheet 5 | 1 | 2 | 3 | 4 | 5 | 6 | 7 | 8 | 9 | 10 | Final |
|---|---|---|---|---|---|---|---|---|---|---|---|
| (Washington (state)) Paul Pustovar | 2 | 1 | 2 | 1 | 0 | 0 | 3 | X | X | X | 9 |
| (Minnesota) Mark Haluptzok | 0 | 0 | 0 | 0 | 1 | 1 | 0 | X | X | X | 2 |

=== Draw 9 ===
Thursday, February 19, 8:00 am

| Sheet 1 | 1 | 2 | 3 | 4 | 5 | 6 | 7 | 8 | 9 | 10 | Final |
|---|---|---|---|---|---|---|---|---|---|---|---|
| (Minnesota) Craig Brown | 0 | 2 | 0 | 1 | 0 | 1 | 0 | 2 | 0 | X | 6 |
| (Minnesota) Korey Dropkin | 0 | 0 | 1 | 0 | 1 | 0 | 1 | 0 | 1 | X | 4 |

| Sheet 2 | 1 | 2 | 3 | 4 | 5 | 6 | 7 | 8 | 9 | 10 | Final |
|---|---|---|---|---|---|---|---|---|---|---|---|
| (Minnesota) Mark Haluptzok | 1 | 0 | 1 | 0 | 0 | 2 | 1 | 0 | 2 | 0 | 7 |
| (Minnesota) Heath McCormick | 0 | 1 | 0 | 3 | 2 | 0 | 0 | 1 | 0 | 1 | 8 |

| Sheet 3 | 1 | 2 | 3 | 4 | 5 | 6 | 7 | 8 | 9 | 10 | 11 | Final |
|---|---|---|---|---|---|---|---|---|---|---|---|---|
| (New York (state)) Brandon Corbett | 0 | 1 | 0 | 2 | 0 | 0 | 0 | 2 | 1 | 0 | 0 | 6 |
| (Washington (state)) Paul Pustovar | 1 | 0 | 1 | 0 | 1 | 1 | 0 | 0 | 0 | 2 | 1 | 7 |

| Sheet 4 | 1 | 2 | 3 | 4 | 5 | 6 | 7 | 8 | 9 | 10 | Final |
|---|---|---|---|---|---|---|---|---|---|---|---|
| (Washington (state)) Brady Clark | 0 | 1 | 0 | 1 | 0 | 0 | 0 | 1 | 0 | X | 3 |
| (Minnesota) Ethan Meyers | 0 | 0 | 1 | 0 | 4 | 0 | 0 | 0 | 1 | X | 6 |

| Sheet 5 | 1 | 2 | 3 | 4 | 5 | 6 | 7 | 8 | 9 | 10 | Final |
|---|---|---|---|---|---|---|---|---|---|---|---|
| (New York (state)) Dean Gemmell | 0 | 3 | 0 | 0 | 1 | 0 | 0 | 3 | 0 | 0 | 7 |
| (Minnesota) John Shuster | 2 | 0 | 0 | 2 | 0 | 3 | 1 | 0 | 0 | 1 | 9 |

== Tiebreakers ==
Semifinals
(Minnesota) Korey Dropkin | 5
(New York (state)) Brandon Corbett | 6
(New York (state)) Dean Gemmell | 8
(Washington (state)) Paul Pustovar | 7

To Playoffs
(New York (state)) Brandon Corbett | 8
(New York (state)) Dean Gemmell | 6

=== Round 1 ===
Thursday, February 19, 4:00 pm

| Team | 1 | 2 | 3 | 4 | 5 | 6 | 7 | 8 | 9 | 10 | 11 | Final |
|---|---|---|---|---|---|---|---|---|---|---|---|---|
| (Minnesota) Korey Dropkin | 0 | 1 | 0 | 1 | 1 | 0 | 1 | 0 | 0 | 1 | 0 | 5 |
| (New York (state)) Brandon Corbett | 0 | 0 | 2 | 0 | 0 | 1 | 0 | 1 | 1 | 0 | 1 | 6 |

Player percentages
| (Minnesota) Team Dropkin | | (New York (state)) Team Corbett | |
|---|---|---|---|
| Andrew Stopera | 78% | Jared Wydysh | 82% |
| Mark Fenner | 87% | Paul Lyttle | 88% |
| Tom Howell | 87% | Derek Corbett | 79% |
| Korey Dropkin | 77% | Brandon Corbett | 70% |
| Total | 82% | Total | 80% |

| Team | 1 | 2 | 3 | 4 | 5 | 6 | 7 | 8 | 9 | 10 | Final |
|---|---|---|---|---|---|---|---|---|---|---|---|
| (New York (state)) Dean Gemmell | 0 | 4 | 0 | 1 | 1 | 0 | 1 | 0 | 0 | 1 | 8 |
| (Washington (state)) Paul Pustovar | 0 | 0 | 1 | 0 | 0 | 2 | 0 | 3 | 1 | 0 | 7 |

Player percentages
| (New York (state)) Team Gemmell | | (Washington (state)) Team Pustovar | |
|---|---|---|---|
| Mark Lazar | 81% | Duane Rutan | 94% |
| Martin Sather | 100% | Sam Galey | 73% |
| Bill Stopera | 83% | Chris Bond | 89% |
| Dean Gemmell | 72% | Paul Pustovar | 75% |
| Total | 84% | Total | 83% |

=== Round 2 ===
Thursday, February 19, 8:00 pm

| Team | 1 | 2 | 3 | 4 | 5 | 6 | 7 | 8 | 9 | 10 | Final |
|---|---|---|---|---|---|---|---|---|---|---|---|
| (New York (state)) Brandon Corbett | 0 | 2 | 1 | 0 | 3 | 0 | 0 | 1 | 0 | 1 | 8 |
| (New York (state)) Dean Gemmell | 1 | 0 | 0 | 2 | 0 | 1 | 0 | 0 | 2 | 0 | 6 |

Player percentages
| (New York (state)) Team Corbett | | (New York (state)) Team Gemmell | |
|---|---|---|---|
| Jared Wydysh | 90% | Mark Lazar | 86% |
| Paul Lyttle | 81% | Martin Sather | 77% |
| Derek Corbett | 90% | Bill Stopera | 74% |
| Brandon Corbett | 79% | Dean Gemmell | 79% |
| Total | 85% | Total | 79% |

== Playoffs ==
Page playoff system
1 | (Minnesota) John Shuster | 7
2 | (Minnesota) Craig Brown | 6
3 | (Minnesota) Heath McCormick | 8
4 | (New York (state)) Brandon Corbett | 5

Semifinal
2 | (Minnesota) Craig Brown | 4
3 | (Minnesota) Heath McCormick | 3

Final
1 | (Minnesota) John Shuster | 8
2 | (Minnesota) Craig Brown | 5

=== 1 vs. 2 ===
Friday, February 20, 12:00 pm

| Team | 1 | 2 | 3 | 4 | 5 | 6 | 7 | 8 | 9 | 10 | Final |
|---|---|---|---|---|---|---|---|---|---|---|---|
| (Minnesota) John Shuster | 0 | 0 | 3 | 2 | 0 | 0 | 1 | 0 | 0 | 1 | 7 |
| (Minnesota) Craig Brown | 0 | 0 | 0 | 0 | 2 | 1 | 0 | 2 | 1 | 0 | 6 |

Player percentages
| (Minnesota) Team Shuster | | (Minnesota) Team Brown | |
|---|---|---|---|
| John Landsteiner | 83% | Sean Beighton | 91% |
| Matt Hamilton | 83% | Jared Zezel | 89% |
| Tyler George | 88% | Kroy Nernberger | 84% |
| John Shuster | 76% | Craig Brown | 86% |
| Total | 83% | Total | 87% |

=== 3 vs. 4 ===
Friday, February 20, 12:00 pm

| Team | 1 | 2 | 3 | 4 | 5 | 6 | 7 | 8 | 9 | 10 | Final |
|---|---|---|---|---|---|---|---|---|---|---|---|
| (Minnesota) Heath McCormick | 2 | 0 | 3 | 0 | 0 | 1 | 0 | 2 | 0 | X | 8 |
| (New York (state)) Brandon Corbett | 0 | 2 | 0 | 1 | 0 | 0 | 2 | 0 | 0 | X | 5 |

Player percentages
| (Minnesota) Team McCormick | | (New York (state)) Team Corbett | |
|---|---|---|---|
| Colin Hufman | 87% | Jared Wydysh | 86% |
| Joe Polo | 86% | Paul Lyttle | 80% |
| Chris Plys | 72% | Derek Corbett | 59% |
| Heath McCormick | 88% | Brandon Corbett | 72% |
| Total | 83% | Total | 74% |

=== Semifinal ===
Friday, February 20, 8:00 pm

| Team | 1 | 2 | 3 | 4 | 5 | 6 | 7 | 8 | 9 | 10 | Final |
|---|---|---|---|---|---|---|---|---|---|---|---|
| (Minnesota) Craig Brown | 0 | 0 | 0 | 0 | 2 | 1 | 1 | 0 | 0 | 0 | 4 |
| (Minnesota) Heath McCormick | 0 | 0 | 1 | 0 | 0 | 0 | 0 | 2 | 0 | 0 | 3 |

Player percentages
| (Minnesota) Team Brown | | (Minnesota) Team McCormick | |
|---|---|---|---|
| Sean Beighton | 85% | Colin Hufman | 92% |
| Jared Zezel | 92% | Joe Polo | 84% |
| Kroy Nernberger | 87% | Chris Plys | 86% |
| Craig Brown | 86% | Heath McCormick | 79% |
| Total | 88% | Total | 85% |

=== Final ===
Saturday, February 21, 3:00 pm

| Team | 1 | 2 | 3 | 4 | 5 | 6 | 7 | 8 | 9 | 10 | Final |
|---|---|---|---|---|---|---|---|---|---|---|---|
| (Minnesota) John Shuster | 1 | 0 | 1 | 0 | 2 | 0 | 0 | 0 | 0 | 4 | 8 |
| (Minnesota) Craig Brown | 0 | 2 | 0 | 2 | 0 | 0 | 0 | 1 | 0 | 0 | 5 |

Player percentages
| (Minnesota) Team Shuster | | (Minnesota) Team Brown | |
|---|---|---|---|
| John Landsteiner | 96% | Sean Beighton | 85% |
| Matt Hamilton | 86% | Jared Zezel | 92% |
| Tyler George | 79% | Kroy Nernberger | 83% |
| John Shuster | 86% | Craig Brown | 84% |
| Total | 87% | Total | 86% |

== Statistics ==
=== Perfect games ===
| Player | Team | Position | Shots | Opponent |
|---|---|---|---|---|
| Jared Zezel | (Minnesota) Team Brown | Second | 16 | (New York (state)) Team Gemmell |
| Heath McCormick | (Minnesota) Team McCormick | Skip | 20 | (New York (state)) Team Corbett |
| Martin Sather | (New York (state)) Team Gemmell | Second | 20 | (Washington (state)) Team Pustovar |
