= 2013 World Men's Curling Championship =

- Host city: Victoria, British Columbia, Canada
- Arena: Save-On-Foods Memorial Centre
- Dates: March 30 – April 7, 2013
- Attendance: 42,966
- Winner: Sweden
- Curling club: Karlstads CK, Karlstad
- Skip: Niklas Edin
- Third: Sebastian Kraupp
- Second: Fredrik Lindberg
- Lead: Viktor Kjäll
- Alternate: Oskar Eriksson
- Coach: Peja Lindholm; Eva Lund
- Finalist: Canada (Brad Jacobs)

The 2013 World Men's Curling Championship (branded as the Ford World Men's Curling Championship 2013 for sponsorship reasons) was held from March 30 to April 7, 2013 at the Save-On-Foods Memorial Centre in Victoria, British Columbia, Canada. This marked the twenty-first time that Canada hosted the World Men's Championship, the fifth time that the province of British Columbia hosted the World Men's Championship, and the second time that Victoria hosted the World Men's Championship. Victoria previously hosted the championships in 2005. The event was also a qualifying event for the 2014 Winter Olympics, awarding points to countries based on performance at this tournament.

== Qualification ==
The following nations qualified to participate in the 2013 World Men's Curling Championship:

- Canada (host nation)
- One team from the Americas zone
  - United States (given that no challenges in the Americas zone were issued)
- Eight teams from the 2012 European Curling Championships
  - Norway
  - Sweden
  - Czech Republic
  - Denmark
  - Russia
  - Switzerland
  - Scotland
  - Finland (winner of the World Challenge Games)
- Two teams from the 2012 Pacific-Asia Curling Championships
  - China
  - Japan

== Teams ==
The teams are listed as follows:

Canada	China	Czech Republic
Soo CA, Sault Ste. Marie Skip: Brad Jacobs; Third: Ryan Fry; Second: E. J. Harnden; Lead: Ryan Harnden; Alternate: Matt Dumontelle	Harbin CC, Harbin Skip: Liu Rui; Third: Xu Xiaoming; Second: Ba Dexin; Lead: Zang Jialiang; Alternate: Zou Dejia	Brno CK, Brno Skip: Jiří Snítil; Third: Martin Snítil; Second: Jakub Bareš; Lead: Marek Vydra; Alternate: Jindřich Kitzberger
Denmark	Finland	Japan
Hvidovre CC, Hvidovre Skip: Rasmus Stjerne; Third: Johnny Frederiksen; Second: Mikkel Poulsen; Lead: Troels Harry; Alternate: Lars Vilandt	M-Curling, Vantaa Skip: Aku Kauste; Third: Jani Sullanmaa; Second: Pauli Jäämies; Lead: Janne Pitko; Alternate: Leo Mäkelä	Karuizawa CC, Karuizawa Skip: Yusuke Morozumi; Third: Tsuyoshi Yamaguchi; Second: Tetsuro Shimizu; Lead: Kosuke Morozumi; Alternate: Yoshiro Shimizu
Norway	Russia	Scotland
Snarøen CC, Oslo Skip: Thomas Ulsrud; Third: Thomas Løvold^{1} Second: Christoffer Svae; Lead: Håvard Vad Petersson; Alternate: Markus Høiberg^{1}	Moskvitch CC, Moscow Skip: Andrey Drozdov; Third: Alexey Stukalskiy; Second: Alexey Tselousov; Lead: Petr Dron; Alternate: Anton Kalalb	Curl Aberdeen, Aberdeen Skip: David Murdoch; Third: Tom Brewster; Second: Scott Andrews; Lead: Michael Goodfellow; Alternate: Greg Drummond
Sweden	Switzerland	United States
Karlstads CK, Karlstad Skip: Niklas Edin; Third: Sebastian Kraupp; Second: Fredrik Lindberg; Lead: Viktor Kjäll; Alternate: Oskar Eriksson	CC Adelboden, Adelboden Skip: Sven Michel; Third: Claudio Pätz; Second: Sandro Trolliet; Lead: Simon Gempeler; Alternate: Benoît Schwarz	Granite CC, Seattle Skip: Brady Clark; Third: Sean Beighton; Second: Darren Lehto; Lead: Phil Tilker; Alternate: Greg Persinger

Notes

1. Torger Nergård, who usually plays third, was not present at the Worlds due to the upcoming birth of his child, so Løvold, the team's longtime alternate, played in his place. Høiberg served as the alternate.

== Round-robin standings ==
Final round-robin standings

Key
Teams to playoffs

Country	Skip	W	L	PF	PA	Ends Won	Ends Lost	Blank Ends	Stolen Ends	Shot %
Scotland	David Murdoch	8	3	75	62	47	46	11	11	86%
Sweden	Niklas Edin	7	4	78	71	49	48	16	7	86%
Denmark	Rasmus Stjerne	7	4	66	57	45	46	16	9	86%
Canada	Brad Jacobs	7	4	76	64	47	43	9	11	87%
Norway	Thomas Ulsrud	6	5	73	71	47	46	12	7	83%
China	Liu Rui	6	5	71	62	51	40	16	16	87%
Switzerland	Sven Michel	6	5	68	62	44	41	21	6	86%
Czech Republic	Jiří Snítil	6	5	69	72	44	46	15	6	81%
United States	Brady Clark	5	6	73	75	44	45	16	5	80%
Russia	Andrey Drozdov	3	8	55	74	42	49	14	9	80%
Japan	Yusuke Morozumi	3	8	67	79	48	54	9	6	81%
Finland	Aku Kauste	2	9	62	82	44	49	11	12	79%

== Round-robin results ==
All draw times are listed in Pacific Daylight Time (UTC−7).

=== Draw 1 ===
Saturday, March 30, 14:00

Sheet A	1	2	3	4	5	6	7	8	9	10	Final
Canada (Jacobs)	0	2	0	1	1	0	3	0	0	0	7
China (Liu)	1	0	0	0	0	1	0	2	1	1	6

Sheet B	1	2	3	4	5	6	7	8	9	10	Final
Sweden (Edin)	0	0	0	0	2	1	0	0	4	0	7
Finland (Kauste)	0	1	2	1	0	0	1	0	0	1	6

Sheet C	1	2	3	4	5	6	7	8	9	10	Final
Czech Republic (Snítil)	0	1	0	2	0	0	1	0	3	1	8
Norway (Ulsrud)	1	0	1	0	2	0	0	1	0	0	5

Sheet D	1	2	3	4	5	6	7	8	9	10	Final
Switzerland (Michel)	1	1	0	2	0	0	1	0	0	1	6
Russia (Drozdov)	0	0	1	0	0	1	0	2	0	0	4

=== Draw 2 ===
Saturday, March 30, 19:00

Sheet A	1	2	3	4	5	6	7	8	9	10	Final
Scotland (Murdoch)	1	1	0	4	0	0	0	1	0	X	7
Japan (Morozumi)	0	0	1	0	1	1	1	0	1	X	5

Sheet B	1	2	3	4	5	6	7	8	9	10	Final
China (Liu)	1	0	2	0	1	0	5	0	3	X	12
Czech Republic (Snítil)	0	0	0	2	0	1	0	2	0	X	5

Sheet C	1	2	3	4	5	6	7	8	9	10	Final
Russia (Drozdov)	1	0	2	0	1	0	0	1	0	0	5
Sweden (Edin)	0	1	0	1	0	1	1	0	1	1	6

Sheet D	1	2	3	4	5	6	7	8	9	10	Final
Denmark (Stjerne)	0	1	0	1	0	0	1	0	0	X	3
United States (Clark)	3	0	2	0	1	0	0	1	1	X	8

=== Draw 3 ===
Sunday, March 31, 9:00

Sheet B	1	2	3	4	5	6	7	8	9	10	Final
Norway (Ulsrud)	0	2	0	0	1	2	0	1	0	2	8
Switzerland (Michel)	2	0	1	1	0	0	1	0	2	0	7

Sheet C	1	2	3	4	5	6	7	8	9	10	Final
Canada (Jacobs)	0	1	0	1	3	0	1	2	0	X	8
Finland (Kauste)	0	0	4	0	0	1	0	0	1	X	6

=== Draw 4 ===
Sunday, March 31, 14:00

Sheet A	1	2	3	4	5	6	7	8	9	10	11	Final
Russia (Drozdov)	0	1	0	0	1	0	0	2	0	2	0	6
Czech Republic (Snítil)	0	0	4	0	0	0	1	0	1	0	1	7

Sheet B	1	2	3	4	5	6	7	8	9	10	Final
United States (Clark)	0	0	1	0	1	0	3	0	1	0	6
Japan (Morozumi)	3	0	0	1	0	1	0	1	0	1	7

Sheet C	1	2	3	4	5	6	7	8	9	10	11	Final
Scotland (Murdoch)	0	1	0	0	0	1	0	1	1	0	1	5
Denmark (Stjerne)	1	0	1	0	0	0	1	0	0	1	0	4

Sheet D	1	2	3	4	5	6	7	8	9	10	Final
Sweden (Edin)	0	0	0	2	0	1	0	0	1	0	4
China (Liu)	0	1	0	0	2	0	0	1	0	1	5

=== Draw 5 ===
Sunday, March 31, 19:00

Sheet A	1	2	3	4	5	6	7	8	9	10	Final
Finland (Kauste)	1	0	1	0	0	0	0	X	X	X	2
Denmark (Stjerne)	0	3	0	1	1	2	2	X	X	X	9

Sheet B	1	2	3	4	5	6	7	8	9	10	Final
Scotland (Murdoch)	0	2	0	1	0	0	0	1	0	X	4
Canada (Jacobs)	1	0	2	0	2	0	2	0	2	X	9

Sheet C	1	2	3	4	5	6	7	8	9	10	Final
United States (Clark)	0	1	0	0	2	0	0	1	0	X	4
Switzerland (Michel)	2	0	1	1	0	3	0	0	1	X	8

Sheet D	1	2	3	4	5	6	7	8	9	10	Final
Norway (Ulsrud)	0	2	0	2	0	2	0	1	0	1	8
Japan (Morozumi)	1	0	1	0	1	0	1	0	2	0	6

=== Draw 6 ===
Monday, April 1, 9:00

Sheet A	1	2	3	4	5	6	7	8	9	10	11	Final
Sweden (Edin)	0	0	0	2	0	0	4	0	0	0	1	7
United States (Clark)	0	2	1	0	0	1	0	0	2	0	0	6

Sheet B	1	2	3	4	5	6	7	8	9	10	Final
Denmark (Stjerne)	0	0	0	2	1	1	0	1	3	0	8
Russia (Drozdov)	0	1	3	0	0	0	1	0	0	1	6

Sheet C	1	2	3	4	5	6	7	8	9	10	Final
Japan (Morozumi)	0	0	2	0	0	1	0	0	2	0	5
China (Liu)	1	1	0	0	1	0	1	2	0	1	7

Sheet D	1	2	3	4	5	6	7	8	9	10	Final
Scotland (Murdoch)	1	0	2	0	0	2	0	1	1	X	7
Czech Republic (Snítil)	0	1	0	1	0	0	1	0	0	X	3

=== Draw 7 ===
Monday, April 1, 14:00

Sheet A	1	2	3	4	5	6	7	8	9	10	Final
China (Liu)	0	1	0	3	0	0	1	1	0	X	6
Russia (Drozdov)	0	0	1	0	0	1	0	0	1	X	3

Sheet B	1	2	3	4	5	6	7	8	9	10	Final
Finland (Kauste)	0	1	0	1	1	0	0	0	1	0	4
Norway (Ulsrud)	2	0	2	0	0	0	1	0	0	2	7

Sheet C	1	2	3	4	5	6	7	8	9	10	Final
Sweden (Edin)	1	0	2	0	0	2	0	1	0	1	7
Czech Republic (Snítil)	0	1	0	0	1	0	1	0	1	0	4

Sheet D	1	2	3	4	5	6	7	8	9	10	Final
Canada (Jacobs)	1	0	2	2	1	0	0	1	X	X	7
Switzerland (Michel)	0	1	0	0	0	1	0	0	X	X	2

=== Draw 8 ===
Monday, April 1, 19:00

Sheet A	1	2	3	4	5	6	7	8	9	10	11	Final
Denmark (Stjerne)	0	0	1	0	0	2	0	0	2	0	2	7
Norway (Ulsrud)	1	1	0	1	0	0	0	1	0	1	0	5

Sheet B	1	2	3	4	5	6	7	8	9	10	Final
Canada (Jacobs)	0	2	0	1	0	4	X	X	X	X	7
United States (Clark)	0	0	1	0	1	0	X	X	X	X	2

Sheet C	1	2	3	4	5	6	7	8	9	10	Final
Switzerland (Michel)	0	0	1	0	0	2	0	2	0	1	6
Scotland (Murdoch)	0	2	0	1	0	0	2	0	3	0	8

Sheet D	1	2	3	4	5	6	7	8	9	10	Final
Japan (Morozumi)	0	2	0	1	0	0	1	0	0	1	5
Finland (Kauste)	1	0	1	0	0	3	0	0	1	0	6

=== Draw 9 ===
Tuesday, April 2, 9:00

Sheet A	1	2	3	4	5	6	7	8	9	10	Final
Czech Republic (Snítil)	0	0	1	0	2	1	0	1	1	X	6
Canada (Jacobs)	0	2	0	1	0	0	1	0	0	X	4

Sheet B	1	2	3	4	5	6	7	8	9	10	Final
Sweden (Edin)	1	0	0	5	0	0	1	0	0	2	9
Switzerland (Michel)	0	0	2	0	2	2	0	0	2	0	8

Sheet C	1	2	3	4	5	6	7	8	9	10	Final
Finland (Kauste)	1	0	0	0	0	2	0	2	1	0	6
Russia (Drozdov)	0	1	1	2	0	0	1	0	0	2	7

Sheet D	1	2	3	4	5	6	7	8	9	10	Final
China (Liu)	1	0	1	0	0	0	0	0	2	0	4
Norway (Ulsrud)	0	1	0	1	0	0	1	1	0	1	5

=== Draw 10 ===
Tuesday, April 2, 14:00

Sheet A	1	2	3	4	5	6	7	8	9	10	11	Final
Japan (Morozumi)	0	0	2	1	0	1	2	0	2	0	2	10
Sweden (Edin)	2	1	0	0	2	0	0	2	0	1	0	8

Sheet B	1	2	3	4	5	6	7	8	9	10	Final
Russia (Drozdov)	1	1	0	0	0	1	0	0	1	0	4
Scotland (Murdoch)	0	0	0	1	3	0	0	1	0	1	6

Sheet C	1	2	3	4	5	6	7	8	9	10	Final
China (Liu)	1	0	2	0	1	0	3	0	1	0	8
United States (Clark)	0	3	0	1	0	2	0	3	0	1	10

Sheet D	1	2	3	4	5	6	7	8	9	10	Final
Czech Republic (Snítil)	0	0	0	1	0	0	2	0	1	1	5
Denmark (Stjerne)	0	1	0	0	4	0	0	1	0	0	6

=== Draw 11 ===
Tuesday, April 2, 19:00

Sheet A	1	2	3	4	5	6	7	8	9	10	Final
Finland (Kauste)	0	0	2	0	0	1	1	0	1	0	5
Switzerland (Michel)	0	1	0	3	1	0	0	1	0	1	7

Sheet B	1	2	3	4	5	6	7	8	9	10	Final
Japan (Morozumi)	0	1	0	0	1	0	1	0	1	0	4
Denmark (Stjerne)	1	0	1	1	0	2	0	1	0	1	7

Sheet C	1	2	3	4	5	6	7	8	9	10	Final
Norway (Ulsrud)	0	2	0	0	1	2	0	2	0	X	7
Canada (Jacobs)	2	0	2	0	0	0	3	0	3	X	10

Sheet D	1	2	3	4	5	6	7	8	9	10	Final
United States (Clark)	2	0	2	0	1	0	0	1	0	2	8
Scotland (Murdoch)	0	2	0	3	0	1	0	0	0	0	6

=== Draw 12 ===
Wednesday, April 3, 8:30

Sheet A	1	2	3	4	5	6	7	8	9	10	Final
Norway (Ulsrud)	0	0	2	0	1	1	0	0	X	X	4
Scotland (Murdoch)	1	2	0	2	0	0	2	1	X	X	8

Sheet B	1	2	3	4	5	6	7	8	9	10	Final
United States (Clark)	0	0	1	0	0	2	0	2	0	2	7
Finland (Kauste)	1	1	0	1	0	0	1	0	2	0	6

Sheet C	1	2	3	4	5	6	7	8	9	10	Final
Denmark (Stjerne)	0	0	0	1	0	1	0	1	1	0	4
Switzerland (Michel)	3	0	0	0	2	0	1	0	0	1	7

Sheet D	1	2	3	4	5	6	7	8	9	10	11	Final
Japan (Morozumi)	0	0	3	0	1	0	3	0	1	0	2	10
Canada (Jacobs)	1	1	0	1	0	1	0	2	0	2	0	8

=== Draw 13 ===
Wednesday, April 3, 13:30

Sheet A	1	2	3	4	5	6	7	8	9	10	Final
Canada (Jacobs)	2	0	1	0	1	1	0	0	2	1	8
Russia (Drozdov)	0	2	0	1	0	0	1	1	0	0	5

Sheet B	1	2	3	4	5	6	7	8	9	10	11	Final
Switzerland (Michel)	0	0	1	0	0	1	0	0	0	2	0	4
China (Liu)	0	0	0	1	0	0	2	0	1	0	1	5

Sheet C	1	2	3	4	5	6	7	8	9	10	Final
Czech Republic (Snítil)	1	0	3	0	3	0	0	0	1	1	9
Finland (Kauste)	0	2	0	1	0	1	1	1	0	0	6

Sheet D	1	2	3	4	5	6	7	8	9	10	11	Final
Norway (Ulsrud)	0	1	0	0	2	0	1	0	1	0	1	6
Sweden (Edin)	0	0	2	0	0	1	0	1	0	1	0	5

=== Draw 14 ===
Wednesday, April 3, 19:00

Sheet A	1	2	3	4	5	6	7	8	9	10	Final
United States (Clark)	3	0	2	0	0	0	1	0	2	0	8
Czech Republic (Snítil)	0	3	0	2	0	0	0	3	0	1	9

Sheet B	1	2	3	4	5	6	7	8	9	10	Final
Scotland (Murdoch)	2	0	0	1	0	1	0	3	0	1	8
Sweden (Edin)	0	2	1	0	1	0	1	0	2	0	7

Sheet C	1	2	3	4	5	6	7	8	9	10	Final
Russia (Drozdov)	0	0	0	1	0	2	0	1	2	0	6
Japan (Morozumi)	0	1	0	0	2	0	1	0	0	1	5

Sheet D	1	2	3	4	5	6	7	8	9	10	11	Final
Denmark (Stjerne)	0	2	0	1	0	3	0	0	0	0	1	7
China (Liu)	0	0	1	0	1	0	1	1	1	1	0	6

=== Draw 15 ===
Thursday, April 4, 9:00

Sheet A	1	2	3	4	5	6	7	8	9	10	Final
Sweden (Edin)	0	1	0	1	0	2	2	0	0	1	7
Denmark (Stjerne)	0	0	2	0	3	0	0	1	0	0	6

Sheet B	1	2	3	4	5	6	7	8	9	10	Final
Czech Republic (Snítil)	0	3	0	1	0	1	0	2	3	X	10
Japan (Morozumi)	1	0	2	0	1	0	1	0	0	X	5

Sheet C	1	2	3	4	5	6	7	8	9	10	Final
Scotland (Murdoch)	2	0	1	0	0	2	0	2	0	X	7
China (Liu)	0	1	0	1	1	0	1	0	0	X	4

Sheet D	1	2	3	4	5	6	7	8	9	10	Final
Russia (Drozdov)	2	0	0	1	0	1	1	0	1	1	7
United States (Clark)	0	0	2	0	2	0	0	1	0	0	5

=== Draw 16 ===
Thursday, April 4, 14:00

Sheet A	1	2	3	4	5	6	7	8	9	10	Final
Switzerland (Michel)	2	0	3	0	0	1	0	0	0	2	8
Japan (Morozumi)	0	2	0	1	0	0	0	2	0	0	5

Sheet B	1	2	3	4	5	6	7	8	9	10	Final
Denmark (Stjerne)	0	1	0	1	0	0	1	0	2	X	5
Canada (Jacobs)	0	0	1	0	1	0	0	1	0	X	3

Sheet C	1	2	3	4	5	6	7	8	9	10	Final
United States (Clark)	3	2	0	0	2	0	0	1	0	1	9
Norway (Ulsrud)	0	0	2	0	0	3	2	0	0	0	7

Sheet D	1	2	3	4	5	6	7	8	9	10	Final
Finland (Kauste)	3	0	2	0	1	3	0	0	0	1	10
Scotland (Murdoch)	0	2	0	4	0	0	1	1	1	0	9

=== Draw 17 ===
Thursday, April 4, 19:00

Sheet A	1	2	3	4	5	6	7	8	9	10	Final
China (Liu)	0	3	1	1	0	0	2	0	1	X	8
Finland (Kauste)	2	0	0	0	2	0	0	1	0	X	5

Sheet B	1	2	3	4	5	6	7	8	9	10	Final
Norway (Ulsrud)	4	0	2	2	0	3	X	X	X	X	11
Russia (Drozdov)	0	2	0	0	1	0	X	X	X	X	3

Sheet C	1	2	3	4	5	6	7	8	9	10	Final
Canada (Jacobs)	0	2	0	3	0	1	0	1	0	0	7
Sweden (Edin)	2	0	2	0	2	0	1	0	2	2	11

Sheet D	1	2	3	4	5	6	7	8	9	10	Final
Switzerland (Michel)	2	0	0	0	1	0	0	2	1	X	6
Czech Republic (Snítil)	0	0	0	1	0	2	0	0	0	X	3

== Playoffs ==
Page playoff system
1	Scotland	5
2	Sweden	6
3	Denmark	6
4	Canada	8

Semifinal
1	Scotland	3
4	Canada	6

Gold medal game
2	Sweden	8
4	Canada	6

Bronze medal game
1	Scotland	7
3	Denmark	6

=== 1 vs. 2 ===
Friday, April 5, 19:00

Sheet B	1	2	3	4	5	6	7	8	9	10	Final
Scotland (Murdoch)	1	0	1	0	0	1	0	1	1	0	5
Sweden (Edin)	0	2	0	0	1	0	2	0	0	1	6

Player percentages
Scotland		Sweden	
Michael Goodfellow	95%	Viktor Kjäll	93%
Greg Drummond	74%	Fredrik Lindberg	88%
Tom Brewster	60%	Sebastian Kraupp	83%
David Murdoch	84%	Niklas Edin	96%
Total	78%	Total	90%

=== 3 vs. 4 ===
Saturday, April 6, 11:00

Sheet B	1	2	3	4	5	6	7	8	9	10	Final
Denmark (Stjerne)	1	0	2	0	0	0	1	0	2	0	6
Canada (Jacobs)	0	2	0	0	0	2	0	2	0	2	8

Player percentages
Denmark		Canada	
Troels Harry	93%	Ryan Harnden	95%
Mikkel Poulsen	83%	E. J. Harnden	90%
Johnny Frederiksen	74%	Ryan Fry	95%
Rasmus Stjerne	81%	Brad Jacobs	86%
Total	83%	Total	92%

=== Semifinal ===
Saturday, April 6, 16:00

Sheet B	1	2	3	4	5	6	7	8	9	10	Final
Scotland (Murdoch)	1	0	0	0	1	0	0	0	1	X	3
Canada (Jacobs)	0	0	0	2	0	3	0	1	0	X	6

Player percentages
Scotland		Canada	
Michael Goodfellow	94%	Ryan Harnden	96%
Scott Andrews	76%	E. J. Harnden	94%
Greg Drummond	81%	Ryan Fry	83%
David Murdoch	88%	Brad Jacobs	93%
Total	85%	Total	92%

=== Bronze medal game ===
Sunday, April 7, 11:00

Sheet B	1	2	3	4	5	6	7	8	9	10	Final
Scotland (Murdoch)	2	0	0	0	0	2	0	3	0	0	7
Denmark (Stjerne)	0	0	0	0	2	0	2	0	2	0	6

Player percentages
Scotland		Denmark	
Michael Goodfellow	99%	Troels Harry	94%
Scott Andrews	83%	Mikkel Poulsen	81%
Tom Brewster	85%	Johnny Frederiksen	84%
David Murdoch	89%	Rasmus Stjerne	86%
Total	89%	Total	86%

=== Gold medal game ===
Sunday, April 7, 16:00

Sheet B	1	2	3	4	5	6	7	8	9	10	Final
Sweden (Edin)	2	0	2	0	1	1	0	2	0	X	8
Canada (Jacobs)	0	1	0	2	0	0	1	0	2	X	6

Player percentages
Sweden		Canada	
Viktor Kjäll	95%	Ryan Harnden	89%
Fredrik Lindberg	88%	E. J. Harnden	86%
Sebastian Kraupp	83%	Ryan Fry	86%
Niklas Edin	88%	Brad Jacobs	75%
Total	88%	Total	84%

2013 Ford World Men's Curling Championship Winner
(Sweden)
Sweden
6th title

== Statistics ==
=== Top 5 player percentages ===
Round robin only

Leads	%
(Canada) Ryan Harnden	91
(China) Zang Jialiang	91
(Switzerland) Simon Gempeler	91
(Finland) Janne Pitko	90
(Russia) Petr Dron	90

Seconds	%
(Canada) E. J. Harnden	89
(China) Ba Dexin	88
(Switzerland) Sandro Trolliet	87
(Denmark) Mikkel Poulsen	87
(Sweden) Fredrik Lindberg	86

Thirds	%
(Canada) Ryan Fry	87
(China) Xu Xiaoming	87
(Denmark) Johnny Frederiksen	87
(Sweden) Sebastian Kraupp	86
(Switzerland) Claudio Pätz	86

Skips	%
(Scotland) David Murdoch	86
(United States) Brady Clark	85
(Switzerland) Sven Michel	84
(China) Liu Rui	84
(Sweden) Niklas Edin	84

=== Perfect games ===
Round robin only

Player	Team	Position	Shots	Opponent
Petr Dron	Russia	Lead	22	Czech Republic
Ryan Harnden	Canada	Lead	12	United States
Ryan Harnden	Canada	Lead	22	Japan
Zang Jialiang	China	Lead	20	Finland
