= Philip Tilker =

American curler

- Curler
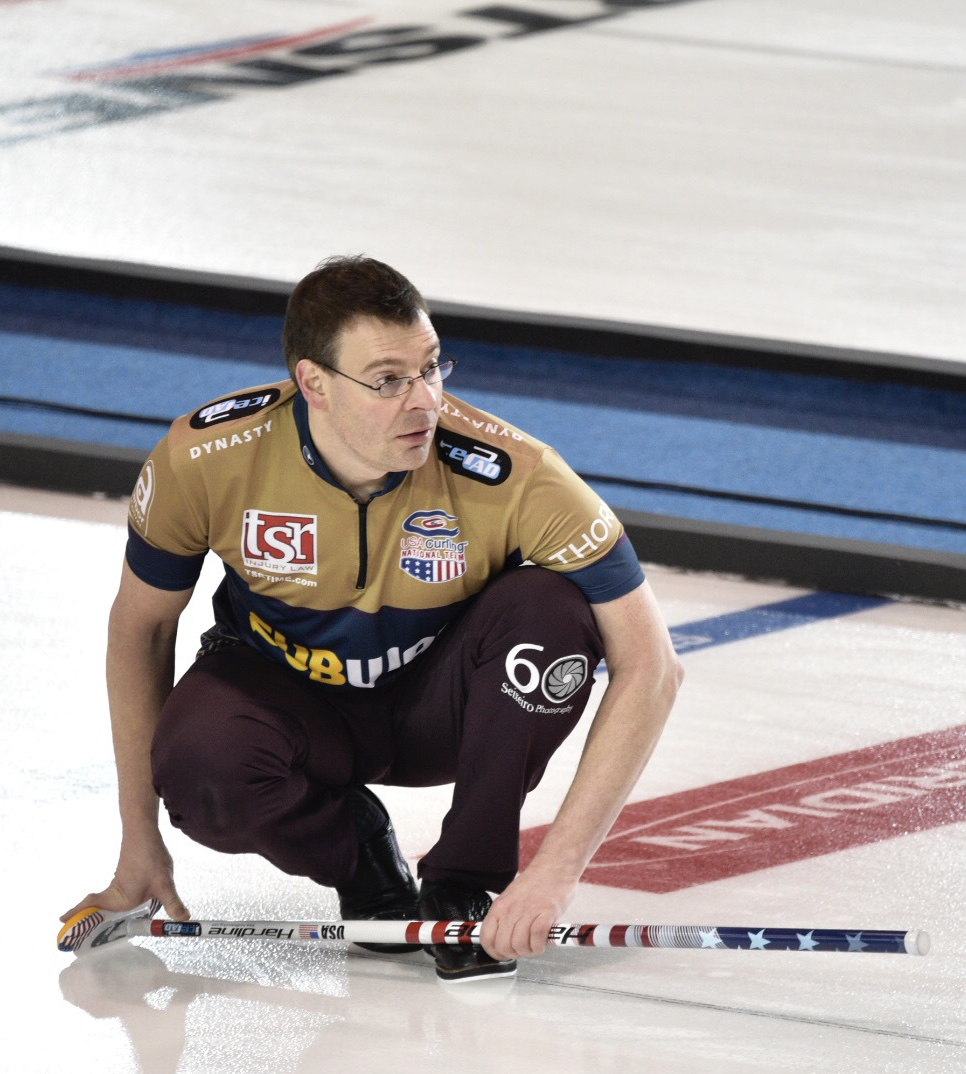
- Philip Tilker while completing at Pintys Grand Slam of Curling 2018 in Thunder Bay, Ontario.
- Born: April 18, 1977 (age 49); Bracebridge, Ontario, Canada

Team
- Curling club: Granite Curling Club (Seattle)
- Skip: Rich Ruohonen
- Third: Andrew Stopera
- Second: Colin Hufman
- Lead: Kroy Nernberger
- Alternate: Phil Tilker

Curling career
- Member Association: United States
- World Championship: 2 (2013, 2018)
- Other appearances: US Men's Curling Championship: 7 (2013, 2014, 2015, 2016, 2017, 2018, 2019); US Olympic Curling Trials: 2 (2013, 2017)
Medal record
Curling
United States Men's Curling Championship
Gold medal – first place	2013 Green Bay
Gold medal – first place	2016 Jacksonville
Gold medal – first place	2018 Fargo
Silver medal – second place	2019 Kalamazoo
Silver medal – second place	2020 Cheney
Bronze medal – third place	2017 Everett

Philip "Phil" Tilker (born April 18, 1977, in Bracebridge, Ontario) is a Canadian-American curler. He was a member of Team USA at the World Men's Curling Championship in 2013 and 2018. Tilker played lead on the Brady Clark rink from 2012 to 2017, and has played in the same position on the Rich Ruohonen rink since then.

At the 2020 United States Men's Championship Tilker and Team Ruohonen earned a silver medal, losing to John Shuster in the final.

== Personal life ==
Tilker works as a software engineer, and lives in Seattle with his wife and son. He became a naturalized American citizen in 2012.

== Teams ==
=== Men's ===
Season	Skip	Third	Second	Lead	Alternate	Coach	Events
2012–13	Brady Clark	Sean Beighton	Darren Lehto	Philip Tilker	Greg Persinger (WMCC)	Ken Trask	2013 USMCC (gold); 2013 WMCC (9th)
2013–14	Brady Clark	Sean Beighton	Darren Lehto	Philip Tilker	Greg Persinger		2013 USOCT (5th)
2013–14	Brady Clark	Sean Beighton	Greg Persinger	Philip Tilker			2014 USMCC (4th)
2014–15	Brady Clark	Greg Persinger	Nick Myers	Matt Birklid	Philip Tilker		2015 USMCC (8th)
2015–16	Brady Clark	Greg Persinger	Colin Hufman	Philip Tilker			2016 USMCC (gold)
2016–17	Brady Clark	Greg Persinger	Colin Hufman	Philip Tilker			2017 USMCC (bronze)
2017–18	Brady Clark	Greg Persinger	Colin Hufman	Philip Tilker			2017 USOCT (5th)
2017–18	Greg Persinger (fourth)	Rich Ruohonen (skip)	Colin Hufman	Philip Tilker	Chris Plys (WMCC)	Phill Drobnick	2018 USMCC (gold); 2018 WMCC (6th)
2018–19	Greg Persinger (fourth)	Rich Ruohonen (skip)	Colin Hufman	Philip Tilker			2019 USMCC (silver)
2019–20	Rich Ruohonen	Greg Persinger	Colin Hufman	Philip Tilker	Kroy Nernberger		2020 USMCC (silver)
2020–21	Rich Ruohonen	Andrew Stopera	Colin Hufman	Philip Tilker	Kroy Nernberger		2021 USMCC (7th)
2021–22	Rich Ruohonen	Andrew Stopera	Colin Hufman	Kroy Nernberger	Philip Tilker		

=== Mixed ===
Season	Skip	Third	Second	Lead	Events
2008–09	Brady Clark	Cristin Clark	Philip Tilker	Bev Walter	2009 USMxCC (gold)
2009–10	Brady Clark	Cristin Clark	Philip Tilker	Bev Walter	2010 USMxCC (gold)
2010–11	Brady Clark	Cristin Clark	Philip Tilker	Bev Walter	2011 USMxCC (gold)
