= 2016 United States Men's Curling Championship =

- Host city: Jacksonville, Florida
- Arena: Jacksonville Veterans Memorial Arena
- Dates: February 6–13
- Winner: Brady Clark
- Curling club: Granite CC, Seattle, Washington
- Skip: Brady Clark
- Third: Greg Persinger
- Second: Colin Hufman
- Lead: Philip Tilker
- Finalist: John Shuster

The 2016 United States Men's Curling Championship was held from February 6 to 13 at the Jacksonville Veterans Memorial Arena in Jacksonville, Florida. It was held in conjunction with the 2016 United States Women's Curling Championship.

== Teams ==
Ten teams participated in the 2016 national championship. The teams are listed as follows:

Skip	Third	Second	Lead	Alternate	Locale	Qualification method
John Shuster	Tyler George	Matt Hamilton	John Landsteiner		Duluth, Minnesota	Order of Merit
Craig Brown	Kroy Nernberger	Jared Zezel	Sean Beighton		Blaine, Minnesota	Order of Merit
Chris Plys (fourth)	Pete Fenson (skip)	Joe Polo	Jason Smith		Blaine, Minnesota	High Performance Program committee selection
Korey Dropkin	Tom Howell	Mark Fenner	Alex Fenson	Quinn Evenson	Blaine, Minnesota	High Performance Program committee selection
Heath McCormick	Bill Stopera	Dean Gemmell	Mark Lazar	Andrew Stopera	New York, New York	Challenge Round
Brady Clark	Greg Persinger	Colin Hufman	Philip Tilker		Seattle, Washington	Challenge Round
Todd Birr	Doug Pottinger	John Benton	Tom O'Connor		Blaine, Minnesota	Challenge Round
Brandon Corbett	Derek Corbett	Paul Lyttle	Jared Wydysh		Rochester, New York	Challenge Round
Alex Leichter	Martin Sather	Nate Clark	Ryan Hallisey		Boston, Massachusetts	Challenge Round
Hunter Clawson	Cody Clouser	Caleb Clawson	Andy Dunnam		Laurel, Maryland	Challenge Round

== Round-robin standings ==
Final round-robin standings

Key
Teams to playoffs

Skip	W	L	PF	PA	Ends won	Ends lost	Blank ends	Stolen ends	Shot pct.
Brady Clark	8	1	74	42	37	30	6	12	88%
John Shuster	7	2	69	50	39	34	6	6	85%
Korey Dropkin	6	3	56	45	36	28	13	11	87%
Craig Brown	5	4	50	51	36	32	16	11	88%
Todd Birr	4	5	59	67	33	40	7	5	83%
Hunter Clawson	4	5	54	61	37	36	12	10	82%
Pete Fenson	4	5	51	56	31	33	26	8	85%
Brandon Corbett	3	6	60	71	41	41	7	11	85%
Alex Leichter	3	6	50	57	30	35	16	7	80%
Heath McCormick	1	8	49	72	32	43	7	6	76%

== Round-robin results ==
=== Draw 1 ===
Saturday, February 6, 4:30 pm

Sheet 1	1	2	3	4	5	6	7	8	9	10	Final
John Shuster	0	3	0	0	1	0	1	0	4	X	9
Heath McCormick	1	0	2	0	0	1	0	1	0	X	5

Sheet 2	1	2	3	4	5	6	7	8	9	10	Final
Hunter Clawson	3	0	1	0	1	1	0	0	1	0	7
Todd Birr	0	1	0	5	0	0	1	0	0	1	8

Sheet 3	1	2	3	4	5	6	7	8	9	10	Final
Craig Brown	1	0	2	0	0	0	2	0	2	X	7
Korey Dropkin	0	1	0	2	0	0	0	1	0	X	4

Sheet 4	1	2	3	4	5	6	7	8	9	10	11	Final
Pete Fenson	0	0	0	2	0	0	0	0	0	1	1	4
Alex Leichter	0	0	1	0	0	2	0	0	0	0	0	3

Sheet 5	1	2	3	4	5	6	7	8	9	10	11	Final
Brady Clark	0	2	0	0	0	2	0	3	0	0	1	8
Brandon Corbett	0	0	1	0	1	0	1	0	2	2	0	7

=== Draw 2 ===
Sunday, February 7, 8:00 am

Sheet 1	1	2	3	4	5	6	7	8	9	10	Final
Brandon Corbett	0	0	2	4	0	1	0	1	0	1	9
Korey Dropkin	0	1	0	0	2	0	1	0	2	0	6

Sheet 2	1	2	3	4	5	6	7	8	9	10	Final
Brady Clark	3	1	1	1	0	1	0	3	X	X	10
Heath McCormick	0	0	0	0	3	0	1	0	X	X	4

Sheet 3	1	2	3	4	5	6	7	8	9	10	Final
Alex Leichter	1	1	0	2	0	2	3	X	X	X	9
Todd Birr	0	0	2	0	1	0	0	X	X	X	3

Sheet 4	1	2	3	4	5	6	7	8	9	10	Final
Craig Brown	0	2	0	0	0	2	2	1	0	0	7
Hunter Clawson	1	0	2	0	1	0	0	0	1	1	6

Sheet 5	1	2	3	4	5	6	7	8	9	10	Final
Pete Fenson	0	1	0	1	0	0	0	X	X	X	2
John Shuster	3	0	1	0	0	0	4	X	X	X	8

=== Draw 3 ===
Sunday, February 7, 4:00 pm

Sheet 1	1	2	3	4	5	6	7	8	9	10	Final
Craig Brown	2	0	0	1	1	0	0	1	1	0	6
Todd Birr	0	2	0	0	0	1	2	0	0	2	7

Sheet 2	1	2	3	4	5	6	7	8	9	10	Final
Korey Dropkin	0	0	0	2	0	2	0	0	2	1	7
Pete Fenson	0	1	0	0	3	0	0	1	0	0	5

Sheet 3	1	2	3	4	5	6	7	8	9	10	Final
Hunter Clawson	0	1	0	0	3	2	1	0	0	1	8
Brandon Corbett	3	0	1	1	0	0	0	1	0	0	6

Sheet 4	1	2	3	4	5	6	7	8	9	10	Final
Brady Clark	0	1	0	3	0	3	0	3	0	X	10
John Shuster	1	0	2	0	1	0	2	0	1	X	7

Sheet 5	1	2	3	4	5	6	7	8	9	10	Final
Alex Leichter	0	2	3	0	0	0	1	0	1	0	7
Heath McCormick	2	0	0	1	1	1	0	2	0	2	9

=== Draw 4 ===
Monday, February 7, 8:00 am

Sheet 1	1	2	3	4	5	6	7	8	9	10	Final
Heath McCormick	1	0	2	0	1	0	1	1	0	X	6
Hunter Clawson	0	2	0	3	0	2	0	0	2	X	9

Sheet 2	1	2	3	4	5	6	7	8	9	10	Final
John Shuster	1	0	3	0	1	2	0	2	X	X	9
Alex Leichter	0	1	0	1	0	0	1	0	X	X	3

Sheet 3	1	2	3	4	5	6	7	8	9	10	Final
Brady Clark	1	0	0	0	2	2	0	2	1	0	8
Pete Fenson	0	0	0	3	0	0	2	0	0	1	6

Sheet 4	1	2	3	4	5	6	7	8	9	10	Final
Korey Dropkin	1	0	1	0	1	1	0	0	0	1	5
Todd Birr	0	1	0	2	0	0	0	1	0	0	4

Sheet 5	1	2	3	4	5	6	7	8	9	10	Final
Brandon Corbett	0	0	0	0	2	0	0	2	0	X	4
Craig Brown	0	1	2	1	0	2	1	0	1	X	8

=== Draw 5 ===
Monday, February 7, 4:00 pm

Sheet 1	1	2	3	4	5	6	7	8	9	10	Final
Alex Leichter	1	0	0	2	0	0	0	3	0	1	7
Craig Brown	0	2	1	0	0	2	0	0	0	0	5

Sheet 2	1	2	3	4	5	6	7	8	9	10	Final
Pete Fenson	1	0	0	2	0	2	0	0	0	0	5
Hunter Clawson	0	1	1	0	2	0	0	0	1	1	6

Sheet 3	1	2	3	4	5	6	7	8	9	10	Final
Korey Dropkin	2	0	2	0	0	2	2	X	X	X	8
John Shuster	0	1	0	1	0	0	0	X	X	X	2

Sheet 4	1	2	3	4	5	6	7	8	9	10	Final
Heath McCormick	0	0	0	0	1	0	2	1	1	0	5
Brandon Corbett	1	1	2	2	0	1	0	0	0	1	8

Sheet 5	1	2	3	4	5	6	7	8	9	10	Final
Todd Birr	2	0	2	0	0	0	1	X	X	X	5
Brady Clark	0	4	0	2	2	2	0	X	X	X	10

=== Draw 6 ===
Tuesday, February 8, 10:00 am

Sheet 1	1	2	3	4	5	6	7	8	9	10	Final
Korey Dropkin	0	0	1	0	1	0	X	X	X	X	2
Brady Clark	1	2	0	2	0	2	X	X	X	X	7

Sheet 2	1	2	3	4	5	6	7	8	9	10	Final
Brandon Corbett	0	3	1	0	1	0	0	0	1	0	6
John Shuster	3	0	0	2	0	1	1	1	0	1	9

Sheet 3	1	2	3	4	5	6	7	8	9	10	Final
Heath McCormick	0	2	0	0	0	1	0	1	0	1	5
Craig Brown	1	0	0	2	1	0	1	0	2	0	7

Sheet 4	1	2	3	4	5	6	7	8	9	10	Final
Todd Birr	4	0	0	1	0	0	2	0	0	0	7
Pete Fenson	0	2	1	0	0	2	0	2	1	3	11

Sheet 5	1	2	3	4	5	6	7	8	9	10	Final
Hunter Clawson	0	0	0	2	0	0	0	0	0	X	2
Alex Leichter	0	2	0	0	0	0	4	0	1	X	7

=== Draw 7 ===
Tuesday, February 8, 7:00 pm

Sheet 1	1	2	3	4	5	6	7	8	9	10	Final
Todd Birr	0	0	2	1	0	1	0	1	0	1	6
John Shuster	0	1	0	0	1	0	3	0	3	0	8

Sheet 2	1	2	3	4	5	6	7	8	9	10	Final
Heath McCormick	0	2	0	0	0	0	0	X	X	X	2
Korey Dropkin	1	0	0	0	1	3	2	X	X	X	7

Sheet 3	1	2	3	4	5	6	7	8	9	10	Final
Brandon Corbett	2	1	1	0	0	2	0	1	0	1	8
Alex Leichter	0	0	0	2	1	0	2	0	2	0	7

Sheet 4	1	2	3	4	5	6	7	8	9	10	Final
Hunter Clawson	0	2	0	1	1	0	1	0	1	1	7
Brady Clark	0	0	2	0	0	1	0	1	0	0	4

Sheet 5	1	2	3	4	5	6	7	8	9	10	Final
Craig Brown	0	0	0	2	0	0	0	1	0	0	3
Pete Fenson	0	0	0	0	0	0	1	0	0	1	2

=== Draw 8 ===
Wednesday, February 9, 10:00 am

Sheet 1	1	2	3	4	5	6	7	8	9	10	11	Final
Pete Fenson	0	0	3	0	3	0	0	0	1	0	1	8
Brandon Corbett	1	0	0	1	0	0	3	1	0	1	0	7

Sheet 2	1	2	3	4	5	6	7	8	9	10	Final
Craig Brown	0	1	0	1	0	0	X	X	X	X	2
Brady Clark	0	0	2	0	2	4	X	X	X	X	8

Sheet 3	1	2	3	4	5	6	7	8	9	10	Final
John Shuster	2	1	0	3	0	0	1	0	2	X	10
Hunter Clawson	0	0	2	0	1	0	0	2	0	X	5

Sheet 4	1	2	3	4	5	6	7	8	9	10	Final
Alex Leichter	2	0	0	0	0	1	0	2	0	0	5
Korey Dropkin	0	2	0	0	2	0	1	0	1	2	8

Sheet 5	1	2	3	4	5	6	7	8	9	10	Final
Heath McCormick	0	0	0	2	0	4	0	0	X	X	6
Todd Birr	1	1	1	0	1	0	0	3	X	X	7

=== Draw 9 ===
Wednesday, February 9, 7:00 pm

Sheet 1	1	2	3	4	5	6	7	8	9	10	Final
Brady Clark	0	1	1	0	2	5	X	X	X	X	9
Alex Leichter	1	0	0	1	0	0	X	X	X	X	2

Sheet 2	1	2	3	4	5	6	7	8	9	10	Final
Todd Birr	0	3	0	1	0	3	0	5	X	X	12
Brandon Corbett	1	0	2	0	1	0	1	0	X	X	5

Sheet 3	1	2	3	4	5	6	7	8	9	10	11	Final
Pete Fenson	2	0	2	1	0	0	0	2	0	0	1	8
Heath McCormick	0	2	0	0	2	2	0	0	0	1	0	7

Sheet 4	1	2	3	4	5	6	7	8	9	10	Final
John Shuster	0	2	1	0	1	0	3	0	0	1	8
Craig Brown	1	0	0	1	0	1	0	1	1	0	5

Sheet 5	1	2	3	4	5	6	7	8	9	10	Final
Korey Dropkin	2	0	1	3	0	1	2	0	X	X	9
Hunter Clawson	0	1	0	0	2	0	0	1	X	X	4

== Playoffs ==
Page playoff system
1	Brady Clark	8
2	John Shuster	2
3	Korey Dropkin	3
4	Craig Brown	7

Semifinal
2	John Shuster	7
4	Craig Brown	1

Final
1	Brady Clark	10
2	John Shuster	4

=== 1 vs. 2 ===
Thursday, February 11, 8:00 pm

Team	1	2	3	4	5	6	7	8	9	10	Final
Brady Clark	0	4	0	0	3	1	X	X	X	X	8
John Shuster	0	0	0	2	0	0	X	X	X	X	2

Player percentages
Team Clark		Team Shuster	
Philip Tilker	94%	John Landsteiner	100%
Colin Hufman	91%	Matt Hamilton	82%
Greg Persinger	100%	Tyler George	94%
Brady Clark	94%	John Shuster	62%
Total	95%	Total	85%

=== 3 vs. 4 ===
Thursday, February 11, 8:00 pm

Team	1	2	3	4	5	6	7	8	9	10	Final
Korey Dropkin	0	0	1	0	0	1	0	1	0	X	3
Craig Brown	0	0	0	2	1	0	3	0	1	X	7

Player percentages
Team Dropkin		Team Brown	
Alex Fenson	81%	Sean Beighton	97%
Mark Fenner	86%	Jared Zezel	92%
Tom Howell	77%	Kroy Nernberger	95%
Korey Dropkin	81%	Craig Brown	96%
Total	71%	Total	95%

=== Semifinal ===
Friday, February 12, 3:00 pm

Team	1	2	3	4	5	6	7	8	9	10	Final
John Shuster	0	2	0	0	0	2	3	X	X	X	7
Craig Brown	0	0	0	0	1	0	0	X	X	X	1

Player percentages
Team Shuster		Team Brown	
John Landsteiner	94%	Sean Beighton	85%
Matt Hamilton	90%	Jared Zezel	75%
Tyler George	96%	Kroy Nernberger	95%
John Shuster	91%	Craig Brown	70%
Total	93%	Total	81%

=== Final ===
Saturday, February 13, 6:00 pm

Team	1	2	3	4	5	6	7	8	9	10	Final
Brady Clark	0	2	1	0	3	0	2	0	2	X	10
John Shuster	0	0	0	1	0	1	0	2	0	X	4

Player percentages
Team Clark		Team Shuster	
Philip Tilker	91%	John Landsteiner	99%
Colin Hufman	95%	Matt Hamilton	82%
Greg Persinger	91%	Tyler George	83%
Brady Clark	93%	John Shuster	76%
Total	93%	Total	85%

== Statistics ==
=== Perfect games ===
Player	Team	Position	Shots	Opponent
Colin Hufman	Team Clark	Second	16	Team McCormick
John Shuster	Team Shuster	Skip	16	Team Leichter
Jared Zezel	Team Brown	Second	18	Team Corbett
Sean Beighton	Team Brown	Lead	20	Team Leichter
Mark Fenner	Team Dropkin	Second	12	Team Clark
Greg Persinger	Team Clark	Third	12	Team Drokpin
Pete Fenson	Team Fenson	Skip	19	Team Birr
Phil Tilker	Team Clark	Lead	20	Team Clawson
Paul Lyttle	Team Corbett	Second	16	Team Birr
Greg Persinger	Team Clark	Third	12	Team Shuster
John Landsteiner	Team Shuster	Lead	12	Team Clark
