= Martin Sather =

American curler

- Curler ♂
- Born: August 23, 1983 (age 43); Fairbanks, Alaska, U.S.

Team
- Curling club: Ardsley CC, New York

Curling career
- Member Association: United States
- World Championship: 1 (2012)
- Other appearances: World Junior Championships: 1 (2002)
Medal record
Curling
Representing (New York (state)) New York
United States Men's Championship
Gold medal – first place	2012 Philadelphia
United States Olympic Curling Trials
Bronze medal – third place	2013 Fargo

Martin Sather (born August 23, 1983, in Fairbanks, Alaska) is an American curler.

In 2002 Sather won the United States Junior Curling Championship, playing second for skip Leo Johnson. The national title earned them the opportunity to represent the United States at the 2002 World Junior Championship in Kelowna, British Columbia, where they finished ninth out of ten teams.

After juniors he took a break but returned to competitive curling in 2010. He won the 2012 United States Men's Championship playing second for Heath McCormick, they then finished 8th at the 2012 World Championship.

== Teams ==
Season	Skip	Third	Second	Lead	Alternate	Coach	Events
2001–02	Leo Johnson	Colin Hufman	Martin Sather	Christopher Benshoof	Steven Birklid (WJCC)	Bill Gryder (WJCC), Dennis Thies (WJCC)	USJCC 2002 (gold); WJCC 2002 (9th)
2009–10	Matt Hames	Bill Stopera	Martin Sather	Dean Gemmell			USMCC 2010 (4th)
2010–11	Heath McCormick	Bill Stopera	Martin Sather	Dean Gemmell			USMCC 2011 (4th)
2011–12	Heath McCormick	Bill Stopera	Martin Sather	Dean Gemmell	Craig Brown (WCC)	Matt Hames	USMCC 2012 (gold); WCC 2012 (8th)
2012–13	Heath McCormick	Bill Stopera	Martin Sather	Dean Gemmell			ContCup 2013 (gold); USMCC 2013 (4th)
2013–14	Heath McCormick	Bill Stopera	Martin Sather	Dean Gemmell			USOCT 2013 (bronze)
2013–14	Tyler George	Bill Stopera	Dean Gemmell	Martin Sather			USMCC 2014 (6th)
2014–15	Dean Gemmell	Bill Stopera	Martin Sather	Mark Lazar			USMCC 2015 (5th)
2015–16	Alex Leichter	Martin Sather	Nate Clark	Ryan Halissey			USMCC 2016 (9th)
2016–17	Alex Leichter	Martin Sather	Nate Clark	Ryan Halissey	Chris Bond		USMCC 2017 (7th)
2017–18	Alex Leichter	Martin Sather	Chris Bond	Jared Wydysh			USMCC 2018 (8th)

== Private life ==
Martin Sather graduated from Western Connecticut State University in 2006.

Out of curling he is a musician and insurance broker.

He started curling in 1992 at the age of 9.
