= Bill Stopera =

American curler

- Curler
- Born: August 13, 1968 (age 58); Schenectady, New York, U.S.

Team
- Curling club: Ardlsey CC, Irvington, NY
- Skip: Mike Farbelow
- Third: Rich Ruohonen
- Second: Bill Stopera
- Lead: Darren Lehto

Curling career
- World Championship: 1 (2012)
- Other appearances: World Senior Curling Championships: 3 (2024, 2025, 2026)
Medal record
Men's curling
Representing United States
World Senior Curling Championships
Gold medal – first place	2026 Geneva
Silver medal – second place	2024 Östersund
Bronze medal – third place	2025 Fredericton
Representing (New York (state)) New York
United States Men's Curling Championship
Gold medal – first place	2012 Philadelphia	Team
United States Olympic Curling Trials
Bronze medal – third place	2013 Fargo	Team

William Stopera (born August 13, 1968) is an American curler from Briarcliff Manor, New York.

== Career ==
Stopera began curling at the Schenectady Curling Club in 1977 as a junior in Schenectady, New York.

In 2009, Stopera teamed up with Matt Hames, Martin Sather, and Dean Gemmell, and finished 4th at the 2010 United States Men's Curling Championship. The next year, Heath McCormick joined the team, replacing Matt Hames, who retired as skip. That year Stopera and the team competed in the 2011 United States Men's Curling Championship, finishing fourth after a playoff loss to Todd Birr.

Stopera returned with the team the next year to play in the 2012 nationals and went through the round robin undefeated, eventually securing their first national title with a win over defending champion Pete Fenson. The team finished the event at 12–0. After winning the National Championship, the team played in the 2012 World Men's Curling Championship in Basel, Switzerland. The team finished 8th with a record of 4–7.

In 2013, Stopera competed with team North America and won the Continental Cup of Curling. He also competed in the 2013 US Men's National Championship and finished fourth after a playoff loss to eventual winner Brady Clark. The following season at the 2013 Olympic Trials, the team finished in 3rd place with a 4–4 record. McCormick left team midway through the 2013–14 season, and Tyler George was brought on to skip. The George rink played in the 2014 United States Men's Curling Championship, finishing with a 4–5 record. After the season, George left the team and was replaced with Gemmell as skip, with Sather playing lead and new addition Calvin Weber at second. Midway through the season, Mark Lazar was brought on to play lead and replace Calvin Weber, moving Martin Sather to second. The team qualified for the 2015 United States Men's Curling Championship where they finished 5th after losing in a tie-breaker. At the end of the 2015, Stopera went to the 2015 United States Club Men's Championship in Fargo, North Dakota with his son Andrew, Peter Austin and George Austin. There, the team won the bronze medal with a 7–5 record.

For the 2015-2016 curling season, Heath McCormick returned to the team as skip with Dean Gemmell moving back to second and Martin Sather leaving to form a new team. The rink retained Mark Lazar at lead and added Andrew Stopera as its alternate. Stopera and team qualified for the 2016 United States Men's Curling Championship in Jacksonville, Florida where they had a poor showing, coming in 10th place. Later in the year, Stopera returned to the Club National Championships, this time with Martin Sather replacing his son Andrew at skip. Despite losing second Peter Austin to a torn abdominal muscle he suffered while sweeping in the middle of the competition, Stopera and his 3-man team won the championship, defeating Illinois in the final.

== Personal life ==
Stopera grew up in Schenectady, New York, and studied at Northeastern University. He works as an insurance broker with Professional Group Marketing. He is married and has two children, Megan and Andrew.

== Teams ==
Season	Skip	Third	Second	Lead	Events
2009–10	Matt Hames	Bill Stopera	Martin Sather	Dean Gemmell	2010 USNCC
2010–11	Heath McCormick	Bill Stopera	Martin Sather	Dean Gemmell	2011 USNCC
2011–12	Heath McCormick	Bill Stopera	Martin Sather	Dean Gemmell	2012 USNCC, 2012 WCC
2012–13	Heath McCormick	Bill Stopera	Martin Sather	Dean Gemmell	2013 USNCC
2013–14	Heath McCormick	Bill Stopera	Dean Gemmell	Martin Sather	2013 USOCT
2013–14	Tyler George	Bill Stopera	Dean Gemmell	Martin Sather	2014 USNCC
2014–15	Dean Gemmell	Bill Stopera	Martin Sather	Mark Lazar	2015 USNCC
2015–16	Heath McCormick	Bill Stopera	Dean Gemmell	Mark Lazar	2016 USNCC
2016–17	Bill Stopera	Dean Gemmell		Mark Lazar	

== Statistics ==
Year	Team	Position	Event	Finish	Record	Pct. (Note: Round robin only)
2010	Hames	Third	2010 USNCC	4th	6–5	–
2011	McCormick	Third	2011 USNCC	4th	6–4	–
2012	McCormick	Third	2012 USNCC	1st	12–0	–
2012	McCormick	Third	2012 WCC	8th	4–7	–
2013	McCormick	Third	2013 USNCC	4th	7–5	78.0
2013	McCormick	Third	2013 USOCT	3rd	4–4	78.0
2014	George	Third	2014 USNCC	6th	4–5	81.8
2015	Gemmell	Third	2015 USNCC	5th	5–6	76.1
2015	Stopera	Third	2015 USCNCC	3rd	7–5	–
2016	McCormick	Third	2016 USNCC	10th	1–8	71.3
2016	Sather	Third	2016 USCNCC	1st	8–3	–
United States Men's Curling Championships					41–33	–
