= Jared Zezel =

American curler

- Curler
- Born: March 4, 1991 (age 35); Hibbing, Minnesota, U.S.

Team
- Curling club: Bemidji CC, Bemidji, MN
- Skip: John Shuster
- Third: Chris Plys
- Second: Matt Hamilton
- Lead: John Landsteiner
- Alternate: Jared Zezel

Curling career
- Member Association: United States
- World Championship: 1 (2014)
- Olympic: 1 (2014)
Medal record
Representing United States
Men's curling
US Olympic Trials
Gold medal – first place	2013 Fargo
US Men's Championship
Bronze medal – third place	2012 Philadelphia
Bronze medal – third place	2013 Green Bay
Silver medal – second place	2015 Kalamazoo
Bronze medal – third place	2016 Jacksonville
US Junior Championship
Silver medal – second place	2009 Devil's Lake
Silver medal – second place	2010 Bemidji
Gold medal – first place	2011 Fairbanks
Mixed doubles curling
US Olympic Trials
Bronze medal – third place	2017 Blaine

Jared Zezel (born March 4, 1991) is an American curler. He competed in the 2014 Winter Olympics.

== Career ==
At the 2013 United States Olympic Curling Trials Zezel was part of the first place team. At the qualification event for the 2014 Winter Olympics, Zezel's team won the second qualifier 8–5 over the Czech Republic to take the final 2014 Olympic qualification spot. At the Olympics Zezel's team finished 9th out of 10 teams with a final record of 2–7.

Zezel has competed in the United States Men's Curling Championship six times, every year from 2012 to 2017. His teams' best finish was 2nd in 2015.
