= Dean Gemmell =

Canadian-American curler

- Curler
- Born: August 27, 1967 (age 59); North Vancouver, British Columbia, Canada

Team
- Curling club: Plainfield CC; South Plainfield, New Jersey
- Skip: Craig Brown
- Third: Bill Stopera
- Second: Dean Gemmell
- Lead: Mark Lazar

Curling career
- Member Association: Ontario (1978-1986); Quebec (1986-1991) (United States) Grand National (2006-present)
- Brier: 1 (1988)
- World Championship: 1 (2012)
Medal record
Men's curling
US Men's Championship
Gold medal – first place	2012 Philadelphia

Dean Gemmell (born August 27, 1967) is a Canadian-American curler and writer who currently resides in Short Hills, New Jersey. Along with John Morris, he is the co-author of the book Fit to Curl, Sport Specific Training for the World's Greatest Game.

== Career ==
Gemmell began curling in 1978 as a junior in Ontario. After moving to Montreal, Quebec in 1986, he played as lead for Lawren Steventon and won the Quebec Men's Provincial Curling Championship in 1988, earning an opportunity to represent Quebec at the 1988 Labatt Brier. Quebec finished in eighth place with a 4–7 win–loss record.

Gemmell moved to the United States in 1991, and did not return to curling until he moved to New Jersey in 2006 and curls out of the Plainfield Curling Club in club play. He participated in the playdowns to the United States National Championships and the United States Mixed Championship in 2007. He participated in the 2010 United States Men's Curling Championship as the lead for Matt Hames, finishing fourth after a loss in the playoffs. He then returned the next year under skip Heath McCormick, who replaced Hames, to the 2011 United States Men's Curling Championship, where his team again finished fourth. At the next national championship, he and his team went through the round robin undefeated, and won the championship after defeating Pete Fenson in the final.

== The Curling Show ==
Gemmell created and hosted a curling podcast called The Curling Show from 2005 to 2017. The podcast released a few episodes each month spanning over 100 hours in total and featured interviews with over 250 individuals including various top curlers and curling builders.

== Personal life ==
Gemmell is married to Amye Gemmell and they have four children. He studied at McGill University in Montréal and graduated with a Bachelor of Arts in Political Science and History.

== Teams ==
=== Men's ===
Season	Skip	Third	Second	Lead	Alternate	Coach	Events
1987–88	Lawren Steventon	Pete Gawel	Marco Ferraro	Dean Gemmell	Malcolm Turner		1988 Brier (8th)
2008–09	Matt Hames	Matt Mielke	Bill Stopera	Dean Gemmell			
2009–10	Matt Hames	Bill Stopera	Martin Sather	Dean Gemmell			2010 USNCC (4th)
2010–11	Heath McCormick	Bill Stopera	Martin Sather	Dean Gemmell			2011 USNCC (4th)
2011–12	Heath McCormick	Bill Stopera	Martin Sather	Dean Gemmell	Craig Brown	Matt Hames	2012 USNCC (gold) , 2012 WCC (8th)
2012–13	Heath McCormick	Bill Stopera	Martin Sather	Dean Gemmell			2013 Cont.Cup (gold) , 2013 USNCC (4th)
2013–14	Heath McCormick	Bill Stopera	Dean Gemmell	Martin Sather			2013 USOCT (bronze)
2013–14	Tyler George	Bill Stopera	Dean Gemmell	Martin Sather			2014 USNCC (6th)
2014–15	Dean Gemmell	Bill Stopera	Calvin Weber	Martin Sather			
2014–15	Dean Gemmell	Bill Stopera	Martin Sather	Mark Lazar	Andrew Stopera		2015 USNCC (5th)
2015–16	Heath McCormick	Bill Stopera	Dean Gemmell	Mark Lazar	Andrew Stopera		2016 USNCC (10th)
2016–17	Bill Stopera	Dean Gemmell		Mark Lazar			
2017–18	Bill Stopera	Dean Gemmell	Michael Moore	Mark Lazar			
2018–19	Craig Brown	Bill Stopera	Dean Gemmell	Mark Lazar			

=== Mixed ===
Season	Skip	Third	Second	Lead	Alternate	Events
2006–07	Scott Edie	Janice Langanke	Dean Gemmell	Jennifer Kungle	Tanya Jacobson	2007 USMxCC (bronze)
