= Sean Beighton =

American curler

- Curler
- Born: November 22, 1988 (age 37); Edmonds, Washington, U.S.

Curling career
- World Championship: 1 (2013)
Medal record
Curling
Representing Washington
US Men's Championship
Gold medal – first place	2013 Green Bay
Silver medal – second place	2015 Kalamazoo
Bronze medal – third place	2016 Jacksonville
US Mixed Doubles Championship
Silver medal – second place	2010 Seattle

Sean Beighton (born November 22, 1988) is an American curler from Seattle, Washington.

== Career ==
During his years of junior eligibility, Beighton was active as a skip. He won the national junior championship in 2010, which gave him the opportunity to represent the United States at the 2010 World Junior Curling Championships, where he finished in ninth place with a 1–8 win–loss record. Beighton also skipped a team which included former national university champion Blake Morton at the qualifying tournament for the 2013 Winter University Games, but finished third.

Beighton played at the 2011 United States Men's Curling Championship as second under Jason Larway, but finished in ninth place and earned the nickname 'Chester.' He was also the national mixed championship in 2012.

As third for Brady Clark, Beighton won his first national championship title, the first for the Granite Curling Club since 2004. Beighton and his team then represented the United States at the 2013 Ford World Men's Curling Championship, finishing in ninth place with a 5–6 win–loss record. The team also qualified to participate at the 2014 United States Olympic Curling Trials due to their performance at the nationals.

== Personal life ==
Beighton works as a software engineer for Amazon. He is currently the coach of the John Shuster rink.
