= 2021 United States Olympic mixed doubles curling trials =

2021 United States mixed doubles curling Olympic trials
- Host city: Eveleth, Minnesota
- Arena: Curl Mesabi
- Dates: October 26–31
- Winner: (Alaska) (Minnesota) Persinger / Plys
- Female: Vicky Persinger
- Male: Chris Plys
- Finalist: (Minnesota) Sinclair / Ruohonen

The 2021 United States mixed doubles curling Olympic trials were held from October 26 to 31, 2021, at Curl Mesabi in Eveleth, Minnesota. The trials featured ten teams playing in a round robin tournament. After the round robin, the top four teams qualified for the page playoff. The winner of this event will represent the United States at the Olympic Qualification Event in hopes of reaching the 2022 Winter Olympics in Beijing, China.

== Impact of the COVID-19 pandemic ==
The 2021 Trials were initially announced to be held in Irvine, California, but less than a month before they were to begin, the decision was made to move them to Eveleth, Minnesota, due to the ongoing COVID-19 pandemic.

== Qualification ==
The following teams qualified to participate in the 2021 mixed doubles trials:

Qualification	Berths	Qualifying team(s)
Highest placing teams at the 2020 US Mixed Doubles Nationals	3	Tabitha Peterson / Joe Polo; Cory Christensen / John Shuster; Sarah Anderson / Korey Dropkin
Highest placing teams at the 2021 US Mixed Doubles Nationals	4	Vicky Persinger / Chris Plys; Madison Bear / Andrew Stopera; Aileen Geving / Luc Violette; Jenna Burchesky / Ben Richardson
Winners of mixed doubles trials qualifier #1	1	Becca Hamilton / Matt Hamilton
Winners of mixed doubles trials qualifier #2	1	Jamie Sinclair / Rich Ruohonen
Highest-ranking non-qualified team from the two qualifiers	1	Monica Walker / Alex Leichter

== Teams ==
The teams competing in the 2021 trials are:

Female	Male	Locale
Sarah Anderson	Korey Dropkin	Duluth, Minnesota
Madison Bear	Andrew Stopera	Chaska, Minnesota
Jenna Burchesky	Ben Richardson	Walpole, Massachusetts
Cory Christensen	John Shuster	Duluth, Minnesota
Aileen Geving	Luc Violette	Duluth, Minnesota
Becca Hamilton	Matt Hamilton	Madison, Wisconsin
Vicky Persinger	Chris Plys	Fairbanks, Alaska / Chaska, Minnesota
Tabitha Peterson	Joe Polo	Chaska, Minnesota
Jamie Sinclair	Rich Ruohonen	Chaska, Minnesota
Monica Walker	Alex Leichter	Boston, Massachusetts

== Round-robin standings ==
Final round-robin standings

Key
Teams to Playoffs
Teams to Tiebreakers

Team	W	L
(Alaska) (Minnesota) Persinger / Plys	6	3
(Minnesota) Anderson / Dropkin	6	3
(Minnesota) Sinclair / Ruohonen	5	4
(Wisconsin) B. Hamilton / M. Hamilton	5	4
(Minnesota) Peterson / Polo	5	4
(Minnesota) Christensen / Shuster	5	4
(Massachusetts) Walker / Leichter	4	5
(Minnesota) Geving / Violette	4	5
(Minnesota) Bear / Stopera	3	6
(Massachusetts) Burchesky / Richardson	2	7

== Round-robin results ==
All draw times are listed in Central Daylight Time (UTC−05:00).

=== Draw 1 ===
Tuesday, October 26, 12:00 pm

Sheet A	1	2	3	4	5	6	7	8	Final
(Minnesota) Bear / Stopera	0	1	0	0	2	0	X	X	3
(Minnesota) Peterson / Polo 🔨	3	0	4	1	0	1	X	X	9

Sheet B	1	2	3	4	5	6	7	8	Final
(Alaska) (Minnesota) Persinger / Plys 🔨	1	1	0	4	2	0	1	X	9
(Minnesota) Anderson / Dropkin	0	0	1	0	0	3	0	X	4

Sheet C	1	2	3	4	5	6	7	8	9	Final
(Minnesota) Christensen / Shuster	0	0	1	1	0	0	0	3	0	5
(Wisconsin) B. Hamilton / M. Hamilton 🔨	1	1	0	0	1	1	1	0	1	6

Sheet D	1	2	3	4	5	6	7	8	Final
(Minnesota) Geving / Violette	0	1	0	0	3	0	0	X	4
(Minnesota) Sinclair / Ruohonen 🔨	1	0	2	2	0	1	3	X	9

Sheet E	1	2	3	4	5	6	7	8	Final
(Massachusetts) Walker / Leichter 🔨	2	0	1	0	1	0	2	0	6
(Massachusetts) Burchesky / Richardson	0	2	0	1	0	2	0	3	8

=== Draw 2 ===
Tuesday, October 26, 7:00 pm

Sheet A	1	2	3	4	5	6	7	8	Final
(Minnesota) Sinclair / Ruohonen	2	0	1	0	3	0	1	0	7
(Massachusetts) Walker / Leichter 🔨	0	2	0	1	0	1	0	1	5

Sheet B	1	2	3	4	5	6	7	8	Final
(Wisconsin) B. Hamilton / M. Hamilton	0	1	1	1	0	0	X	X	3
(Minnesota) Geving / Violette 🔨	4	0	0	0	3	1	X	X	8

Sheet C	1	2	3	4	5	6	7	8	Final
(Massachusetts) Burchesky / Richardson 🔨	0	1	0	0	1	0	X	X	2
(Alaska) (Minnesota) Persinger / Plys	1	0	2	1	0	5	X	X	9

Sheet D	1	2	3	4	5	6	7	8	Final
(Minnesota) Bear / Stopera	2	0	5	1	0	2	0	X	10
(Minnesota) Anderson / Dropkin 🔨	0	2	0	0	2	0	1	X	5

Sheet E	1	2	3	4	5	6	7	8	Final
(Minnesota) Christensen / Shuster 🔨	1	0	0	1	0	0	0	X	2
(Minnesota) Peterson / Polo	0	1	1	0	1	1	1	X	5

=== Draw 3 ===
Wednesday, October 27, 10:00 am

Sheet A	1	2	3	4	5	6	7	8	Final
(Minnesota) Geving / Violette	0	2	0	2	0	0	3	1	8
(Minnesota) Christensen / Shuster 🔨	1	0	1	0	2	1	0	0	5

Sheet B	1	2	3	4	5	6	7	8	Final
(Massachusetts) Burchesky / Richardson	0	1	2	0	0	0	5	0	8
(Minnesota) Bear / Stopera 🔨	1	0	0	1	1	1	0	2	6

Sheet C	1	2	3	4	5	6	7	8	Final
(Minnesota) Peterson / Polo	1	0	1	0	3	0	1	0	6
(Minnesota) Anderson / Dropkin 🔨	0	1	0	2	0	1	0	4	8

Sheet D	1	2	3	4	5	6	7	8	Final
(Wisconsin) B. Hamilton / M. Hamilton 🔨	3	1	0	0	3	0	4	X	11
(Massachusetts) Walker / Leichter	0	0	1	2	0	1	0	X	4

Sheet E	1	2	3	4	5	6	7	8	Final
(Minnesota) Sinclair / Ruohonen	0	0	1	0	3	0	2	0	6
(Alaska) (Minnesota) Persinger / Plys 🔨	1	1	0	1	0	3	0	1	7

=== Draw 4 ===
Wednesday, October 27, 2:30 pm

Sheet A	1	2	3	4	5	6	7	8	Final
(Massachusetts) Burchesky / Richardson	0	0	2	0	2	0	2	0	6
(Minnesota) Anderson / Dropkin 🔨	2	1	0	2	0	1	0	1	7

Sheet B	1	2	3	4	5	6	7	8	Final
(Minnesota) Christensen / Shuster 🔨	2	1	2	0	2	X	X	X	7
(Minnesota) Sinclair / Ruohonen	0	0	0	1	0	X	X	X	1

Sheet C	1	2	3	4	5	6	7	8	Final
(Minnesota) Geving / Violette 🔨	0	1	0	2	0	1	1	0	5
(Massachusetts) Walker / Leichter	1	0	1	0	3	0	0	1	6

Sheet D	1	2	3	4	5	6	7	8	Final
(Minnesota) Peterson / Polo	0	2	2	1	0	4	X	X	9
(Alaska) (Minnesota) Persinger / Plys 🔨	1	0	0	0	3	0	X	X	4

Sheet E	1	2	3	4	5	6	7	8	Final
(Wisconsin) B. Hamilton / M. Hamilton 🔨	0	0	3	2	2	0	1	X	8
(Minnesota) Bear / Stopera	1	2	0	0	0	1	0	X	4

=== Draw 5 ===
Wednesday, October 27, 7:00 pm

Sheet A	1	2	3	4	5	6	7	8	Final
(Alaska) (Minnesota) Persinger / Plys	1	0	1	2	0	3	0	0	7
(Wisconsin) B. Hamilton / M. Hamilton 🔨	0	1	0	0	3	0	1	1	6

Sheet B	1	2	3	4	5	6	7	8	Final
(Massachusetts) Walker / Leichter 🔨	4	0	2	2	0	1	1	X	10
(Minnesota) Peterson / Polo	0	3	0	0	2	0	0	X	5

Sheet C	1	2	3	4	5	6	7	8	9	Final
(Minnesota) Sinclair / Ruohonen 🔨	1	0	0	1	0	1	1	1	0	5
(Minnesota) Bear / Stopera	0	1	1	0	3	0	0	0	3	8

Sheet D	1	2	3	4	5	6	7	8	Final
(Minnesota) Christensen / Shuster 🔨	1	0	0	3	0	2	0	1	7
(Massachusetts) Burchesky / Richardson	0	1	1	0	2	0	1	0	5

Sheet E	1	2	3	4	5	6	7	8	Final
(Minnesota) Geving / Violette	0	0	1	0	3	0	1	X	5
(Minnesota) Anderson / Dropkin 🔨	2	2	0	3	0	1	0	X	8

=== Draw 6 ===
Thursday, October 28, 12:00 pm

Sheet A	1	2	3	4	5	6	7	8	Final
(Minnesota) Peterson / Polo	1	0	0	0	2	0	1	0	4
(Minnesota) Sinclair / Ruohonen 🔨	0	1	1	1	0	2	0	1	6

Sheet B	1	2	3	4	5	6	7	8	Final
(Minnesota) Geving / Violette	1	1	0	4	0	0	1	0	7
(Massachusetts) Burchesky / Richardson 🔨	0	0	1	0	1	2	0	1	5

Sheet C	1	2	3	4	5	6	7	8	Final
(Alaska) (Minnesota) Persinger / Plys	1	0	0	0	3	0	0	2	6
(Minnesota) Christensen / Shuster 🔨	0	1	2	3	0	1	1	0	8

Sheet D	1	2	3	4	5	6	7	8	Final
(Minnesota) Anderson / Dropkin 🔨	1	0	1	1	1	0	4	X	8
(Wisconsin) B. Hamilton / M. Hamilton	0	2	0	0	0	2	0	X	4

Sheet E	1	2	3	4	5	6	7	8	Final
(Minnesota) Bear / Stopera	0	0	3	1	0	1	0	0	5
(Massachusetts) Walker / Leichter 🔨	1	1	0	0	1	0	4	2	9

=== Draw 7 ===
Thursday, October 28, 7:00 pm

Sheet A	1	2	3	4	5	6	7	8	Final
(Minnesota) Christensen / Shuster	0	2	0	0	3	1	0	1	7
(Minnesota) Bear / Stopera 🔨	1	0	2	1	0	0	2	0	6

Sheet B	1	2	3	4	5	6	7	8	Final
(Minnesota) Anderson / Dropkin 🔨	0	1	1	1	1	1	0	X	5
(Massachusetts) Walker / Leichter	1	0	0	0	0	0	2	X	3

Sheet C	1	2	3	4	5	6	7	8	Final
(Wisconsin) B. Hamilton / M. Hamilton 🔨	0	0	0	1	2	0	3	4	10
(Minnesota) Peterson / Polo	1	1	1	0	0	1	0	0	4

Sheet D	1	2	3	4	5	6	7	8	Final
(Alaska) (Minnesota) Persinger / Plys	0	3	0	3	0	1	0	1	8
(Minnesota) Geving / Violette 🔨	3	0	1	0	1	0	2	0	7

Sheet E	1	2	3	4	5	6	7	8	9	Final
(Massachusetts) Burchesky / Richardson	0	2	1	0	2	1	0	2	0	8
(Minnesota) Sinclair / Ruohonen 🔨	3	0	0	3	0	0	2	0	1	9

=== Draw 8 ===
Friday, October 29, 12:00 pm

Sheet A	1	2	3	4	5	6	7	8	Final
(Massachusetts) Walker / Leichter	1	1	0	0	0	2	0	1	5
(Alaska) (Minnesota) Persinger / Plys 🔨	0	0	3	1	1	0	1	0	6

Sheet B	1	2	3	4	5	6	7	8	Final
(Minnesota) Sinclair / Ruohonen 🔨	2	0	1	1	0	0	2	2	8
(Wisconsin) B. Hamilton / M. Hamilton	0	1	0	0	3	1	0	0	5

Sheet C	1	2	3	4	5	6	7	8	Final
(Minnesota) Bear / Stopera 🔨	0	0	0	3	0	4	0	0	7
(Minnesota) Geving / Violette	2	2	1	0	1	0	2	1	9

Sheet D	1	2	3	4	5	6	7	8	9	Final
(Massachusetts) Burchesky / Richardson	0	1	2	0	2	1	1	0	0	7
(Minnesota) Peterson / Polo 🔨	3	0	0	1	0	0	0	3	1	8

Sheet E	1	2	3	4	5	6	7	8	Final
(Minnesota) Anderson / Dropkin	0	2	0	0	1	0	X	X	3
(Minnesota) Christensen / Shuster 🔨	1	0	5	2	0	3	X	X	11

=== Draw 9 ===
Friday, October 29, 6:00 pm

Sheet A	1	2	3	4	5	6	7	8	Final
(Wisconsin) B. Hamilton / M. Hamilton 🔨	1	1	1	1	0	1	0	X	5
(Massachusetts) Burchesky / Richardson	0	0	0	0	1	0	1	X	2

Sheet B	1	2	3	4	5	6	7	8	Final
(Minnesota) Bear / Stopera	0	4	2	0	1	0	0	1	8
(Alaska) (Minnesota) Persinger / Plys 🔨	1	0	0	1	0	3	1	0	6

Sheet C	1	2	3	4	5	6	7	8	Final
(Minnesota) Anderson / Dropkin 🔨	1	2	1	0	2	0	2	X	8
(Minnesota) Sinclair / Ruohonen	0	0	0	2	0	1	0	X	3

Sheet D	1	2	3	4	5	6	7	8	Final
(Massachusetts) Walker / Leichter	1	1	0	4	0	2	2	1	11
(Minnesota) Christensen / Shuster 🔨	0	0	4	0	3	0	0	0	7

Sheet E	1	2	3	4	5	6	7	8	Final
(Minnesota) Peterson / Polo 🔨	1	1	0	1	1	0	3	X	7
(Minnesota) Geving / Violette	0	0	1	0	0	1	0	X	2

== Tiebreakers ==
Saturday, October 30, 8:00 am

Sheet C	1	2	3	4	5	6	7	8	Final
(Minnesota) Sinclair / Ruohonen 🔨	2	0	2	0	0	4	0	X	8
(Minnesota) Christensen / Shuster	0	1	0	2	1	0	1	X	5

Sheet D	1	2	3	4	5	6	7	8	Final
(Wisconsin) B. Hamilton / M. Hamilton	1	1	0	0	0	1	2	0	5
(Minnesota) Peterson / Polo 🔨	0	0	2	1	1	0	0	4	8

== Playoffs ==
Page playoff system
1	(Alaska) (Minnesota) Persinger / Plys	8
2	(Minnesota) Anderson / Dropkin	4
3	(Minnesota) Sinclair / Ruohonen	6
4	(Minnesota) Peterson / Polo	5

Semifinal
2	(Minnesota) Anderson / Dropkin	7
3	(Minnesota) Sinclair / Ruohonen	9

Final
1	(Alaska) (Minnesota) Persinger / Plys	7
3	(Minnesota) Sinclair / Ruohonen	6

=== 1 vs. 2 ===
Saturday, October 30, 2:30 pm

Sheet C	1	2	3	4	5	6	7	8	Final
(Alaska) (Minnesota) Persinger / Plys 🔨	1	1	4	1	0	1	0	X	8
(Minnesota) Anderson / Dropkin	0	0	0	0	2	0	2	X	4

=== 3 vs. 4 ===
Saturday, October 30, 12:00 pm

Sheet C	1	2	3	4	5	6	7	8	Final
(Minnesota) Sinclair / Ruohonen 🔨	0	1	2	0	1	1	0	1	6
(Minnesota) Peterson / Polo	1	0	0	3	0	0	1	0	5

=== Semifinal ===
Sunday, October 31, 11:00 am

Sheet C	1	2	3	4	5	6	7	8	Final
(Minnesota) Anderson / Dropkin 🔨	2	0	2	0	1	0	2	0	7
(Minnesota) Sinclair / Ruohonen	0	3	0	2	0	1	0	3	9

=== Final ===
Sunday, October 31, 7:00 pm

Sheet C	1	2	3	4	5	6	7	8	Final
(Alaska) (Minnesota) Persinger / Plys 🔨	1	0	2	1	0	2	0	1	7
(Minnesota) Sinclair / Ruohonen	0	2	0	0	3	0	1	0	6
