= Aanders Brorson =

American curler

- Curler
- Born: April 29, 1988 (age 38); Calgary, Alberta, Canada
Medal record
Curling
Representing United States
World Junior Championships
Gold medal – first place	2008 Östersund
Bronze medal – third place	2009 Vancouver

Aanders Brorson (born April 29, 1988) is an American curler from Duluth, Minnesota. He played third on Chris Plys' team that won the 2008 World Junior Curling Championship.

== Curling career ==
Brorson, playing third for Chris Plys, won the Minnesota Junior Men's State Championship three years in a row, from 2007 to 2009. Each of those years they continued on to win the United States Junior Championship, earning an opportunity to represent the United States at the World Championships. At the 2007 World Junior Championship in Eveleth, Minnesota, with Matt Perushek playing second and Joel Cooper playing lead, they finished in fifth place when they lost a tiebreaker to Denmark's Rasmus Stjerne. The next year World's was in Östersund, Sweden and Matt Hamilton had replaced Cooper at lead. After finishing the round-robin with a 7–2 record they defeated the number one seed Canada in the semifinals and the number two seed Sweden, skipped by Oskar Eriksson, in the final to win the gold medal. The same team returned to the World Junior Championships one more time in 2009, in Vancouver, where they beat Sweden's Eriksson to win the bronze medal.

== Personal life ==
Brorson's sister Sophie is also a competitive curler; she is also a multi-time national champion and won bronze at the 2010 World Junior Championships.
