= 2020 United States Men's Curling Championship =

- Host city: Spokane, Washington
- Arena: Eastern Washington University; Recreation Center
- Dates: February 8–15
- Winner: (Minnesota) Team Shuster
- Skip: John Shuster
- Third: Chris Plys
- Second: Matt Hamilton
- Lead: John Landsteiner
- Finalist: (Minnesota) Rich Ruohonen

The 2020 United States Men's Curling Championship was held from February 8 to 15, 2020 at the Eastern Washington University Recreation Center in Spokane, Washington. The event was held in conjunction with the 2020 United States Women's Curling Championship. John Shuster claimed his seventh United States Championship, defeating Rich Ruohonen in the final.

Since Team Shuster met certain prerequisites in terms of world ranking points (60 points year-to-date or ranked 70th or higher) they would have represented the United States at the 2020 World Men's Curling Championship, which was scheduled to be held in Glasgow, Scotland from March 28 to April 5, 2020 but was cancelled due to the COVID-19 pandemic. The United States Champions also earn a spot at the final Grand Slam of the season, the Champions Cup, which was also cancelled due to the pandemic. Team Shuster's qualification will instead carry over to the 2021 Champions Cup.

== Qualification ==
There were three ways for teams to qualify for the championship:

- Top five American teams in the World Curling Federation (WCF) World Team Ranking System on Dec 2, 2019
  - Team Dropkin
  - Team Ruohonen
  - Team Shuster
  - Team Dunnam
  - Team Birr
- Four teams from the 2020 United States Men's Challenge Round
  - Team Brundidge
  - Team Kakela
  - Team Maerki
  - ~~Team Violette~~ Team Birklid *replaced with alternate due to conflict with World Junior Championships
- A team from the 2020 United States Junior Men's Championship
  - Team Sinnett

=== Challenge round ===
Sixteen teams competed at the 2020 United States Men's Challenge Round, held at the Grand Forks Curling Club in Grand Forks, North Dakota, from January 2 to 5. Through a triple knockout competition the top four teams secured a spot at the National Championship. Jed Brundidge was the first to secure a spot, defeating Dominik Märki in the 'A' bracket final. Märki then dropped down to the 'B' bracket final and had another opportunity to play for a spot in the Nationals, but this time lost to Kyle Kakela who took the second Nationals berth. In the 'C' bracket Märki finally earned their spot when they defeated Steven Birklid's team. On the other side of the 'C' bracket Luc Violette defeated Nicholas Connolly for the fourth and final Nationals berth. Steven Birklid's team finished the Challenge Round as the alternate team.

== Teams ==
Ten teams participated in the 2020 national championship.

Skip	Third	Second	Lead	Alternate	Locale
Korey Dropkin	Tom Howell	Mark Fenner	Alex Fenson	Joe Polo	Chaska, Minnesota
Todd Birr	Andrew Stopera	Hunter Clawson	Tom O'Connor		Ham Lake, Minnesota
Jed Brundidge	Evan Workin	Jarl Timothy Wagner	Cameron Rittenour		West St. Paul, Minnesota
Scott Dunnam	Alex Leichter	Cody Clouser	Andrew Dunnam	Daniel Dudt	Philadelphia, Pennsylvania
Kevin Kakela	Kyle Kakela	Timothy Hodek	JP Munich	Owen Sampson	Rolla, North Dakota
Rich Ruohonen	Greg Persinger	Colin Hufman	Phil Tilker	Kroy Nernberger	Minneapolis, Minnesota
John Shuster	Chris Plys	Matt Hamilton	John Landsteiner		Duluth, Minnesota
Dominik Märki	Stephen Dropkin	Shawn Banyai	Erik Quistgaard	Jason Smith	Chaska, Minnesota
Steven Birklid	Sam Galey	Matt Birklid	Chris Bond	Daniel Plys	(Washington (state)) Mountlake Terrace, Washington
Chase Sinnett	Sam Strouse	Eli Clawson	Ethan Sampson	Trevor Marquardt	Medfield, Massachusetts

== Round-robin standings ==
Final round-robin standings

Key
Teams to playoffs

Skip	W	L
(Minnesota) John Shuster	9	0
(Minnesota) Rich Ruohonen	7	2
(Minnesota) Dominik Märki	5	4
(Massachusetts) Chase Sinnett	5	4
(Washington (state)) Steven Birklid	4	5
(Minnesota) Korey Dropkin	4	5
(Pennsylvania) Scott Dunnam	4	5
(Minnesota) Todd Birr	3	6
(North Dakota) Kevin Kakela	3	6
(Minnesota) Jed Brundidge	1	8

== Round-robin results ==
All draw times are listed in Pacific Standard Time (UTC−08:00).

=== Draw 1 ===
Saturday, February 8, 7:30 pm

Sheet A	1	2	3	4	5	6	7	8	9	10	Final
(Minnesota) Korey Dropkin	2	2	0	1	0	0	2	0	X	X	7
(North Dakota) Kevin Kakela	0	0	1	0	1	0	0	1	X	X	3

Sheet B	1	2	3	4	5	6	7	8	9	10	11	Final
(Minnesota) Todd Birr	0	0	2	0	0	0	2	1	1	1	0	7
(Pennsylvania) Scott Dunnam	0	3	0	1	2	1	0	0	0	0	1	8

Sheet C	1	2	3	4	5	6	7	8	9	10	Final
(Minnesota) Rich Ruohonen	4	2	0	3	3	X	X	X	X	X	12
(Minnesota) Jed Brundidge	0	0	1	0	0	X	X	X	X	X	1

Sheet D	1	2	3	4	5	6	7	8	9	10	Final
(Minnesota) John Shuster	0	2	0	2	0	1	0	3	X	X	8
(Minnesota) Dominik Märki	1	0	1	0	1	0	0	0	X	X	3

Sheet E	1	2	3	4	5	6	7	8	9	10	Final
(Massachusetts) Chase Sinnett	1	0	2	0	1	0	3	1	0	X	8
(Washington (state)) Steven Birklid	0	1	0	2	0	1	0	0	1	X	5

=== Draw 2 ===
Sunday, February 9, 12:00 pm

Sheet A	1	2	3	4	5	6	7	8	9	10	Final
(Minnesota) John Shuster	5	0	4	1	X	X	X	X	X	X	10
(Washington (state)) Steven Birklid	0	1	0	0	X	X	X	X	X	X	1

Sheet B	1	2	3	4	5	6	7	8	9	10	Final
(Minnesota) Jed Brundidge	0	0	0	1	0	X	X	X	X	X	1
(Minnesota) Dominik Märki	3	2	2	0	3	X	X	X	X	X	10

Sheet C	1	2	3	4	5	6	7	8	9	10	Final
(Massachusetts) Chase Sinnett	1	0	0	2	0	1	0	1	0	2	7
(Minnesota) Todd Birr	0	2	1	0	2	0	0	0	1	0	6

Sheet D	1	2	3	4	5	6	7	8	9	10	Final
(Pennsylvania) Scott Dunnam	0	0	1	0	1	0	1	0	2	0	5
(Minnesota) Korey Dropkin	0	2	0	2	0	1	0	1	0	1	7

Sheet E	1	2	3	4	5	6	7	8	9	10	Final
(North Dakota) Kevin Kakela	1	0	1	0	3	0	0	0	0	X	5
(Minnesota) Rich Ruohonen	0	3	0	1	0	2	0	2	1	X	9

=== Draw 3 ===
Sunday, February 9, 8:00 pm

Sheet A	1	2	3	4	5	6	7	8	9	10	Final
(Pennsylvania) Scott Dunnam	2	0	2	1	2	0	0	2	X	X	9
(Massachusetts) Chase Sinnett	0	1	0	0	0	2	1	0	X	X	4

Sheet B	1	2	3	4	5	6	7	8	9	10	Final
(Minnesota) Rich Ruohonen	1	0	1	0	0	2	0	0	0	X	4
(Minnesota) John Shuster	0	0	0	1	1	0	3	1	1	X	7

Sheet C	1	2	3	4	5	6	7	8	9	10	Final
(Washington (state)) Steven Birklid	0	1	0	1	0	0	3	1	0	0	6
(Minnesota) Dominik Märki	1	0	2	0	2	0	0	0	1	3	9

Sheet D	1	2	3	4	5	6	7	8	9	10	Final
(Minnesota) Todd Birr	0	0	2	0	5	0	5	X	X	X	12
(North Dakota) Kevin Kakela	0	3	0	1	0	1	0	X	X	X	5

Sheet E	1	2	3	4	5	6	7	8	9	10	Final
(Minnesota) Korey Dropkin	0	1	0	1	1	0	3	0	0	1	7
(Minnesota) Jed Brundidge	2	0	1	0	0	1	0	2	0	0	6

=== Draw 4 ===
Monday, February 10, 10:00 am

Sheet A	1	2	3	4	5	6	7	8	9	10	Final
(Minnesota) Rich Ruohonen	1	1	0	0	0	3	2	X	X	X	7
(Minnesota) Dominik Märki	0	0	1	0	0	0	0	X	X	X	1

Sheet B	1	2	3	4	5	6	7	8	9	10	Final
(Massachusetts) Chase Sinnett	2	0	0	1	1	3	0	1	X	X	8
(Minnesota) Korey Dropkin	0	2	0	0	0	0	0	0	X	X	2

Sheet C	1	2	3	4	5	6	7	8	9	10	Final
(Pennsylvania) Scott Dunnam	0	0	1	1	0	1	0	2	1	0	6
(North Dakota) Kevin Kakela	0	2	0	0	1	0	2	0	0	2	7

Sheet D	1	2	3	4	5	6	7	8	9	10	Final
(Washington (state)) Steven Birklid	0	0	1	1	0	1	1	2	1	X	7
(Minnesota) Jed Brundidge	2	0	0	0	1	0	0	0	0	X	3

Sheet E	1	2	3	4	5	6	7	8	9	10	Final
(Minnesota) Todd Birr	1	0	1	0	0	1	1	0	0	X	4
(Minnesota) John Shuster	0	2	0	4	1	0	0	0	1	X	8

=== Draw 5 ===
Monday, February 10, 7:00 pm

Sheet A	1	2	3	4	5	6	7	8	9	10	Final
(Minnesota) Jed Brundidge	1	0	2	2	1	2	X	X	X	X	8
(Minnesota) Todd Birr	0	0	0	0	0	0	X	X	X	X	0

Sheet B	1	2	3	4	5	6	7	8	9	10	Final
(North Dakota) Kevin Kakela	1	0	2	1	0	0	0	0	0	X	4
(Washington (state)) Steven Birklid	0	3	0	0	0	1	2	1	3	X	10

Sheet C	1	2	3	4	5	6	7	8	9	10	Final
(Minnesota) Korey Dropkin	2	0	1	0	2	0	2	0	2	0	9
(Minnesota) John Shuster	0	2	0	2	0	2	0	1	0	3	10

Sheet D	1	2	3	4	5	6	7	8	9	10	Final
(Massachusetts) Chase Sinnett	0	0	1	0	0	0	0	X	X	X	1
(Minnesota) Rich Ruohonen	2	1	0	2	0	1	1	X	X	X	7

Sheet E	1	2	3	4	5	6	7	8	9	10	Final
(Pennsylvania) Scott Dunnam	0	0	0	0	1	1	1	0	X	X	3
(Minnesota) Dominik Märki	3	2	1	1	0	0	0	1	X	X	8

=== Draw 6 ===
Tuesday, February 11, 2:00 pm

Sheet A	1	2	3	4	5	6	7	8	9	10	Final
(Washington (state)) Steven Birklid	1	0	2	1	0	1	0	1	0	1	7
(Minnesota) Korey Dropkin	0	1	0	0	1	0	1	0	3	0	6

Sheet B	1	2	3	4	5	6	7	8	9	10	Final
(Pennsylvania) Scott Dunnam	1	0	1	0	0	2	0	0	0	1	5
(Minnesota) Rich Ruohonen	0	0	0	1	0	0	0	2	1	0	4

Sheet C	1	2	3	4	5	6	7	8	9	10	Final
(Minnesota) Jed Brundidge	0	0	0	0	1	0	3	0	1	X	5
(Massachusetts) Chase Sinnett	2	0	0	1	0	2	0	2	0	X	7

Sheet D	1	2	3	4	5	6	7	8	9	10	Final
(Minnesota) Dominik Märki	2	0	2	0	1	0	0	0	0	2	7
(Minnesota) Todd Birr	0	2	0	1	0	2	0	2	1	0	8

Sheet E	1	2	3	4	5	6	7	8	9	10	Final
(Minnesota) John Shuster	1	0	2	0	3	0	2	1	X	X	9
(North Dakota) Kevin Kakela	0	1	0	1	0	1	0	0	X	X	3

=== Draw 7 ===
Wednesday, February 12, 9:00 am

Sheet A	1	2	3	4	5	6	7	8	9	10	Final
(Massachusetts) Chase Sinnett	0	1	0	1	0	0	1	0	X	X	3
(Minnesota) John Shuster	1	0	1	0	0	5	0	1	X	X	8

Sheet B	1	2	3	4	5	6	7	8	9	10	Final
(Minnesota) Dominik Märki	0	1	1	0	0	2	0	2	0	X	6
(North Dakota) Kevin Kakela	3	0	0	2	1	0	2	0	2	X	10

Sheet C	1	2	3	4	5	6	7	8	9	10	Final
(Minnesota) Todd Birr	2	0	3	0	2	0	2	0	1	X	10
(Washington (state)) Steven Birklid	0	1	0	1	0	2	0	1	0	X	5

Sheet D	1	2	3	4	5	6	7	8	9	10	Final
(Minnesota) Jed Brundidge	0	0	1	0	3	0	0	0	0	X	4
(Pennsylvania) Scott Dunnam	0	1	0	1	0	1	1	3	1	X	8

Sheet E	1	2	3	4	5	6	7	8	9	10	Final
(Minnesota) Rich Ruohonen	3	0	0	2	1	0	0	1	0	X	7
(Minnesota) Korey Dropkin	0	1	0	0	0	2	0	0	1	X	4

=== Draw 8 ===
Wednesday, February 12, 7:00 pm

Sheet A	1	2	3	4	5	6	7	8	9	10	Final
(Minnesota) Todd Birr	0	1	0	2	0	0	0	1	0	X	4
(Minnesota) Rich Ruohonen	2	0	1	0	1	0	2	0	2	X	8

Sheet B	Final
(Minnesota) John Shuster	W
(Minnesota) Jed Brundidge	L

Sheet C	1	2	3	4	5	6	7	8	9	10	Final
(Minnesota) Dominik Märki	0	1	0	1	0	2	1	0	0	X	5
(Minnesota) Korey Dropkin	0	0	1	0	1	0	0	1	1	X	4

Sheet D	1	2	3	4	5	6	7	8	9	10	Final
(North Dakota) Kevin Kakela	0	1	0	0	1	0	1	1	0	X	4
(Massachusetts) Chase Sinnett	5	0	0	2	0	1	0	0	2	X	10

Sheet E	1	2	3	4	5	6	7	8	9	10	Final
(Washington (state)) Steven Birklid	0	0	1	1	1	2	0	1	0	1	7
(Pennsylvania) Scott Dunnam	1	0	0	0	0	0	3	0	2	0	6

=== Draw 9 ===
Thursday, February 13, 2:00 pm

Sheet A	1	2	3	4	5	6	7	8	9	10	Final
(North Dakota) Kevin Kakela	0	3	3	0	1	0	1	2	X	X	10
(Minnesota) Jed Brundidge	1	0	0	2	0	2	0	0	X	X	5

Sheet B	1	2	3	4	5	6	7	8	9	10	Final
(Minnesota) Korey Dropkin	2	3	0	1	2	2	X	X	X	X	10
(Minnesota) Todd Birr	0	0	2	0	0	0	X	X	X	X	2

Sheet C	1	2	3	4	5	6	7	8	9	10	Final
(Minnesota) John Shuster	0	1	1	1	0	3	0	0	1	X	7
(Pennsylvania) Scott Dunnam	2	0	0	0	1	0	0	1	0	X	4

Sheet D	1	2	3	4	5	6	7	8	9	10	Final
(Minnesota) Rich Ruohonen	0	3	0	0	0	4	0	2	0	2	11
(Washington (state)) Steven Birklid	2	0	2	1	3	0	1	0	1	0	10

Sheet E	1	2	3	4	5	6	7	8	9	10	11	Final
(Minnesota) Dominik Märki	1	0	3	0	0	2	0	2	0	0	1	9
(Massachusetts) Chase Sinnett	0	2	0	0	5	0	0	0	0	1	0	8

== Playoffs ==
Page playoff system
1	(Minnesota) John Shuster	8
2	(Minnesota) Rich Ruohonen	2
3	(Minnesota) Dominik Märki	2
4	(Massachusetts) Chase Sinnett	6

Semifinal
2	(Minnesota) Rich Ruohonen	9
4	(Massachusetts) Chase Sinnett	5

Final
1	(Minnesota) John Shuster	8
2	(Minnesota) Rich Ruohonen	6

=== 1 vs. 2 ===
Friday, February 14, 12:00 pm

Sheet C	1	2	3	4	5	6	7	8	9	10	Final
(Minnesota) John Shuster	1	0	1	0	2	0	4	X	X	X	8
(Minnesota) Rich Ruohonen	0	0	0	1	0	1	0	X	X	X	2

Player percentages
(Minnesota) Team Shuster		(Minnesota) Team Ruohonen	
John Landsteiner	87%	Kroy Nernberger	91%
Matt Hamilton	80%	Colin Hufman	68%
Chris Plys	86%	Greg Persinger	79%
John Shuster	90%	Rich Ruohonen	81%
Total	86%	Total	79%

=== 3 vs. 4 ===
Friday, February 14, 12:00 pm

Sheet B	1	2	3	4	5	6	7	8	9	10	Final
(Minnesota) Dominik Märki	0	0	1	1	0	0	0	0	0	X	2
(Massachusetts) Chase Sinnett	1	1	0	0	1	1	0	1	1	X	6

Player percentages
(Minnesota) Team Märki		(Massachusetts) Team Sinnett	
Erik Quistgaard	76%	Trevor Marquardt	83%
Stephen Dropkin	78%	Ethan Sampson	88%
Dominik Märki	77%	Sam Strouse	89%
Jason Smith	78%	Chase Sinnett	89%
Total	77%	Total	87%

=== Semifinal ===
Friday, February 14, 7:00 pm

Sheet D	1	2	3	4	5	6	7	8	9	10	Final
(Minnesota) Rich Ruohonen	0	2	1	0	0	1	0	0	4	1	9
(Massachusetts) Chase Sinnett	1	0	0	2	1	0	0	1	0	0	5

Player percentages
(Minnesota) Team Ruohonen		(Massachusetts) Team Sinnett	
Phil Tilker	90%	Trevor Marquardt	87%
Colin Hufman	67%	Eli Clawson	84%
Greg Persinger	84%	Sam Strouse	71%
Rich Ruohonen	72%	Chase Sinnett	78%
Total	78%	Total	80%

=== Final ===
Saturday, February 15, 5:00 pm

Sheet C	1	2	3	4	5	6	7	8	9	10	Final
(Minnesota) John Shuster	1	0	2	0	1	0	2	0	1	1	8
(Minnesota) Rich Ruohonen	0	1	0	2	0	1	0	2	0	0	6

Player percentages
(Minnesota) Team Shuster		(Minnesota) Team Ruohonen	
John Landsteiner	95%	Phil Tilker	86%
Matt Hamilton	79%	Colin Hufman	65%
Chris Plys	79%	Greg Persinger	57%
John Shuster	83%	Rich Ruohonen	85%
Total	84%	Total	73%

2020 United States Men's Curling Championship

John Shuster
7th United States Championship title
