= 2025 United States Olympic curling trials =

Curling competition in South Dakota, US

2025 United States Olympic Curling Trials
- Host city: Sioux Falls, South Dakota
- Arena: Denny Sanford Premier Center
- Dates: November 11–16
- Men's winner: (Minnesota) Team Casper
- Curling club: Chaska CC, Chaska
- Skip: Daniel Casper
- Third: Luc Violette
- Second: Ben Richardson
- Lead: Aidan Oldenburg
- Alternate: Rich Ruohonen
- Coach: Jordan Moulton
- Finalist: (Minnesota) John Shuster
- Women's winner: (Minnesota) Team Peterson
- Curling club: St. Paul CC, St. Paul
- Skip: Tabitha Peterson
- Third: Cory Thiesse
- Second: Tara Peterson
- Lead: Taylor Anderson-Heide
- Coach: Cathy Overton-Clapham
- Finalist: (New Hampshire) Elizabeth Cousins

The 2025 United States Olympic Curling Team Trials for Men's and Women's curling took place from November 11 to 16, 2025 in the Denny Sanford Premier Center in Sioux Falls, South Dakota. The men's and women's team trials each feature four teams who played in a double round robin tournament, with the top two teams then playing a best-of-three final. The winner of both the men's (Team Daniel Casper) and women's (Team Tabitha Peterson) events represented the United States at the 2025 Olympic Qualification Event, where both qualified for the 2026 Winter Olympics.

== Qualification ==
The Men's and Women's trials each consisted of four teams. The winners of the 2024 and 2025 Men's and Women's National Championships each qualified, on the condition that they placed 6th or higher at the World Championships. The top United States teams on the World Curling Federation's Team Rankings that have not already qualified will then fill the trials until there are three teams each. However, because the 2025 men's team and 2024 and 2025 women's teams did not place in the top 6 at the World Championships, the top two ranked men's teams and top 3 ranked women's teams, based on the World Curling Team Rankings, qualified directly for trials. The final slot at trials was filled with the winner of the 2025 United States Olympic Curling Team Pre-Trials.

The following teams qualified to participate in the 2025 Curling Olympic Team Trials:

=== Men ===
Qualification	Qualifying Team(s)
Winner of the 2024 United States Men's Curling Championship	(Minnesota) John Shuster
Top Ranked 2 Teams as of May 1, 2025	(Minnesota) Korey Dropkin (Minnesota) Daniel Casper
2025 United States Olympic Curling Team Pre-Trials	(Wisconsin) Caden Hebert

=== Women ===
Qualification	Qualifying Team(s)
Top 3 Ranked Teams as of May 1, 2025	(Michigan) Delaney Strouse (Minnesota) Tabitha Peterson (New Hampshire) Elizabeth Cousins
2025 United States Olympic Curling Team Pre-Trials	(Minnesota) Allory Johnson

== Men ==
=== Teams ===
The teams are listed as follows:

Skip	Third	Second	Lead	Alternate	Locale
Daniel Casper	Luc Violette	Ben Richardson	Aidan Oldenburg	Rich Ruohonen	Chaska, Minnesota
Korey Dropkin	Tom Howell	Andrew Stopera	Mark Fenner		Duluth, Minnesota
Caden Hebert	Jackson Bestland	Benji Paral	Jack Wendtland	Daniel Laufer	Eau Claire, Wisconsin
John Shuster	Chris Plys	Colin Hufman	Matt Hamilton	John Landsteiner	Duluth, Minnesota

=== Round Robin Standings ===
Final Round Robin Standings

Key
Teams to Playoff

Team	W	L	W–L	PF	PA	EW	EL	BE	SE	DSC
(Minnesota) John Shuster	6	0	–	47	27	27	21	3	7	26.66
(Minnesota) Daniel Casper	4	2	–	47	40	24	22	5	5	25.23
(Minnesota) Korey Dropkin	2	4	–	41	38	23	22	6	6	19.48
(Wisconsin) Caden Hebert	0	6	–	25	55	19	28	2	1	32.32

Round Robin Summary Table
Pos.	Team	(Minnesota) Casper		(Minnesota) Dropkin		(Wisconsin) Hebert		(Minnesota) Shuster		Record
Pos.	Team	1st	2nd	1st	2nd	1st	2nd	1st	2nd	Record
2	(Minnesota) Casper	—N/a		9–7	10–6	14–6	7–5	2–10	5–6	4–2
3	(Minnesota) Dropkin	7–9	6–10	—N/a		8–2	10–2	5–7	5–8	2–4
4	(Wisconsin) Hebert	6–14	5–7	2–8	2–10	—N/a		3–8	7–8	0–6
1	(Minnesota) Shuster	10–2	6–5	7–5	8–5	8–3	8–7	—N/a		6–0

=== Round-robin results ===
All draws are listed in Central Time (UTC−06:00).

==== Draw 1 ====
Tuesday, November 11, 12:00 pm

Sheet A	1	2	3	4	5	6	7	8	9	10	Final
(Wisconsin) Caden Hebert	0	1	0	0	1	0	0	1	0	X	3
(Minnesota) John Shuster	0	0	2	1	0	1	1	0	3	X	8

Sheet B	1	2	3	4	5	6	7	8	9	10	11	Final
(Minnesota) Daniel Casper	0	0	0	0	2	0	2	3	0	0	2	9
(Minnesota) Korey Dropkin	0	0	1	0	0	2	0	0	2	2	0	7

==== Draw 2 ====
Tuesday, November 11, 7:00 pm

Sheet C	1	2	3	4	5	6	7	8	9	10	Final
(Wisconsin) Caden Hebert	0	0	1	0	0	1	0	X	X	X	2
(Minnesota) Korey Dropkin	0	3	0	2	1	0	2	X	X	X	8

Sheet D	1	2	3	4	5	6	7	8	9	10	Final
(Minnesota) Daniel Casper	0	1	0	1	0	0	X	X	X	X	2
(Minnesota) John Shuster	3	0	4	0	1	2	X	X	X	X	10

==== Draw 3 ====
Wednesday, November 12, 12:00 pm

Sheet A	1	2	3	4	5	6	7	8	9	10	Final
(Minnesota) John Shuster	1	0	0	0	0	3	0	1	1	1	7
(Minnesota) Korey Dropkin	0	0	1	2	1	0	1	0	0	0	5

Sheet B	1	2	3	4	5	6	7	8	9	10	Final
(Wisconsin) Caden Hebert	0	2	0	2	0	2	0	0	X	X	6
(Minnesota) Daniel Casper	2	0	2	0	3	0	2	5	X	X	14

==== Draw 4 ====
Wednesday, November 12, 7:00 pm

Sheet C	1	2	3	4	5	6	7	8	9	10	Final
(Minnesota) John Shuster	1	0	0	1	0	3	0	0	0	1	6
(Minnesota) Daniel Casper	0	0	3	0	1	0	0	0	1	0	5

Sheet D	1	2	3	4	5	6	7	8	9	10	Final
(Minnesota) Korey Dropkin	1	1	0	0	2	0	6	X	X	X	10
(Wisconsin) Caden Hebert	0	0	1	0	0	1	0	X	X	X	2

==== Draw 5 ====
Thursday, November 13, 12:00 pm

Sheet A	1	2	3	4	5	6	7	8	9	10	Final
(Minnesota) Korey Dropkin	0	0	0	2	0	3	0	1	0	0	6
(Minnesota) Daniel Casper	0	2	0	0	2	0	2	0	2	2	10

Sheet B	1	2	3	4	5	6	7	8	9	10	11	Final
(Minnesota) John Shuster	0	0	3	0	1	0	1	0	2	0	1	8
(Wisconsin) Caden Hebert	0	2	0	1	0	2	0	1	0	1	0	7

==== Draw 6 ====
Thursday, November 13, 7:00 pm

Sheet C	1	2	3	4	5	6	7	8	9	10	11	Final
(Minnesota) Korey Dropkin	1	1	0	0	1	0	0	0	0	2	0	5
(Minnesota) John Shuster	0	0	2	1	0	0	0	0	2	0	3	8

Sheet D	1	2	3	4	5	6	7	8	9	10	Final
(Wisconsin) Caden Hebert	0	0	1	0	1	1	0	0	2	X	5
(Minnesota) Daniel Casper	1	1	0	2	0	0	1	2	0	X	7

=== Playoff ===
The final round was between the top two teams at the end of the round robin. The teams played a best-of-three series.

Best-of-three
1	(Minnesota) John Shuster	6	7	5
2	(Minnesota) Daniel Casper	7	6	7

==== Game 1 ====
Friday, November 14, 7:00 pm

Sheet C	1	2	3	4	5	6	7	8	9	10	Final
(Minnesota) John Shuster	2	0	0	0	0	1	0	2	1	0	6
(Minnesota) Daniel Casper	0	0	2	0	0	0	4	0	0	1	7

==== Game 2 ====
Saturday, November 15, 6:00 pm

Sheet C	1	2	3	4	5	6	7	8	9	10	Final
(Minnesota) John Shuster	0	2	0	0	1	0	0	2	0	2	7
(Minnesota) Daniel Casper	1	0	1	0	0	1	0	0	3	0	6

==== Game 3 ====
Sunday, November 16, 6:00 pm

Sheet C	1	2	3	4	5	6	7	8	9	10	Final
(Minnesota) John Shuster	0	2	0	0	1	0	1	0	1	X	5
(Minnesota) Daniel Casper	1	0	0	2	0	2	0	2	0	X	7

== Women ==
=== Teams ===
The teams are listed as follows:

Skip	Third	Second	Lead	Alternate	Locale
Elizabeth Cousins	Annmarie Dubberstein	Allison Howell	Elizabeth Janiak		Nashua, New Hampshire
Allory Johnson	Gianna Johnson	Morgan Zacher	Bailey Vaydich	Ella Wendling	Blaine, Minnesota
Tabitha Peterson	Cory Thiesse	Tara Peterson	Taylor Anderson-Heide		Saint Paul, Minnesota
Delaney Strouse (Fourth)	Anne O'Hara	Sydney Mullaney	Madison Bear (Skip) (Note: Madison Bear skipped Team Delaney Strouse.)		Traverse City, Michigan

=== Round Robin Standings ===
Final Round Robin Standings

Key
Teams to Playoff
Teams to Tiebreaker

Team	W	L	W–L	PF	PA	EW	EL	BE	SE	DSC
(Minnesota) Tabitha Peterson	5	1	–	51	36	22	21	3	7	16.44
(New Hampshire) Elizabeth Cousins	3	3	2–0	47	44	31	26	0	12	26.80
(Michigan) Delaney Strouse	3	3	0–2	41	39	26	24	4	9	19.21
(Minnesota) Allory Johnson	1	5	–	32	52	21	30	3	4	31.54

Round Robin Summary Table
Pos.	Team	(New Hampshire) Cousins		(Minnesota) Johnson		(Minnesota) Peterson		(Michigan) Strouse		Record
Pos.	Team	1st	2nd	1st	2nd	1st	2nd	1st	2nd	Record
2	(New Hampshire) Cousins	—N/a		10–7	6–7	5–9	9–10	7–6	10–5	3–3
4	(Minnesota) Johnson	7–10	7–6	—N/a		4–10	5–9	5–9	4–8	1–5
1	(Minnesota) Peterson	9–5	10–9	10–4	9–5	—N/a		8–5	5–8	5–1
3	(Michigan) Strouse	6–7	5–10	9–5	8–4	5–8	8–5	—N/a		3–3

=== Round-robin results ===
All draws are listed in Central Time (UTC−06:00).

==== Draw 1 ====
Tuesday, November 11, 12:00 pm

Sheet C	1	2	3	4	5	6	7	8	9	10	Final
(Minnesota) Allory Johnson	0	1	0	3	0	0	0	1	0	X	5
(Michigan) Delaney Strouse	1	0	3	0	2	2	0	0	1	X	9

Sheet D	1	2	3	4	5	6	7	8	9	10	Final
(New Hampshire) Elizabeth Cousins	0	1	0	2	1	0	0	0	1	X	5
(Minnesota) Tabitha Peterson	2	0	1	0	0	1	1	4	0	X	9

==== Draw 2 ====
Tuesday, November 11, 7:00 pm

Sheet A	1	2	3	4	5	6	7	8	9	10	Final
(Minnesota) Allory Johnson	0	1	0	0	1	0	2	0	0	X	4
(Minnesota) Tabitha Peterson	0	0	1	1	0	2	0	3	3	X	10

Sheet B	1	2	3	4	5	6	7	8	9	10	11	Final
(New Hampshire) Elizabeth Cousins	0	0	0	1	0	2	0	2	0	1	1	7
(Michigan) Delaney Strouse	1	2	1	0	1	0	1	0	0	0	0	6

==== Draw 3 ====
Wednesday, November 12, 12:00 pm

Sheet C	1	2	3	4	5	6	7	8	9	10	Final
(Michigan) Delaney Strouse	0	2	0	0	2	0	0	1	0	0	5
(Minnesota) Tabitha Peterson	0	0	2	0	0	0	1	0	3	2	8

Sheet D	1	2	3	4	5	6	7	8	9	10	Final
(Minnesota) Allory Johnson	0	2	1	0	1	1	0	2	0	X	8
(New Hampshire) Elizabeth Cousins	4	0	0	2	0	0	1	0	3	X	10

==== Draw 4 ====
Wednesday, November 12, 7:00 pm

Sheet A	1	2	3	4	5	6	7	8	9	10	Final
(Michigan) Delaney Strouse	0	0	0	2	0	2	1	0	0	X	5
(New Hampshire) Elizabeth Cousins	1	1	2	0	1	0	0	3	2	X	10

Sheet B	1	2	3	4	5	6	7	8	9	10	Final
(Minnesota) Tabitha Peterson	0	2	1	0	1	0	3	0	2	X	9
(Minnesota) Allory Johnson	0	0	0	1	0	2	0	2	0	X	5

==== Draw 5 ====
Thursday, November 13, 12:00 pm

Sheet C	1	2	3	4	5	6	7	8	9	10	Final
(Minnesota) Tabitha Peterson	0	2	0	2	0	4	0	2	0	0	10
(New Hampshire) Elizabeth Cousins	1	0	4	0	1	0	1	0	1	1	9

Sheet D	1	2	3	4	5	6	7	8	9	10	Final
(Michigan) Delaney Strouse	0	1	2	1	0	2	0	0	2	X	8
(Minnesota) Allory Johnson	0	0	0	0	1	0	2	1	0	X	4

==== Draw 6 ====
Thursday, November 13, 7:00 pm

Sheet A	1	2	3	4	5	6	7	8	9	10	Final
(Minnesota) Tabitha Peterson	0	1	0	0	1	3	0	0	0	X	5
(Michigan) Delaney Strouse	0	0	2	1	0	0	1	1	3	X	8

Sheet B	1	2	3	4	5	6	7	8	9	10	11	Final
(Minnesota) Allory Johnson	0	0	0	0	0	1	2	0	3	0	1	7
(New Hampshire) Elizabeth Cousins	0	1	1	1	1	0	0	1	0	1	0	6

=== Tiebreaker ===
Friday, November 14, 8:00 am

Team	1	2	3	4	5	6	7	8	9	10	Final
(New Hampshire) Elizabeth Cousins	0	0	1	0	3	0	2	0	1	2	9
(Michigan) Delaney Strouse	0	1	0	3	0	0	0	1	0	0	5

=== Playoff ===
The final round was between the top two teams at the end of the round robin. The teams played a best-of-three series.

Best-of-three
1	(Minnesota) Tabitha Peterson	7	8	X
2	(New Hampshire) Elizabeth Cousins	4	4	X

==== Game 1 ====
Friday, November 14, 2:00 pm

Sheet C	1	2	3	4	5	6	7	8	9	10	Final
(Minnesota) Tabitha Peterson	0	1	0	2	1	0	0	3	0	X	7
(New Hampshire) Elizabeth Cousins	0	0	1	0	0	2	0	0	1	X	4

==== Game 2 ====
Saturday, November 15, 2:00 pm

Sheet C	1	2	3	4	5	6	7	8	9	10	Final
(Minnesota) Tabitha Peterson	0	2	1	0	0	2	0	2	1	X	8
(New Hampshire) Elizabeth Cousins	1	0	0	1	0	0	2	0	0	X	4
