= 2025 United States Olympic curling team pre-trials =

2025 United States Olympic Curling Team Pre-Trials
- Host city: Charlotte, North Carolina (men's); Chaska, Minnesota (women's)
- Arena: Charlotte Curling Association (men's); Chaska Curling Center (women's)
- Dates: September 11–14
- Men's winner: (Wisconsin) Team Hebert
- Curling club: Eau Claire CC, Eau Claire
- Skip: Caden Hebert
- Third: Jackson Bestland
- Second: Benji Paral
- Lead: Jack Wendtland
- Finalist: (Minnesota) Chase Sinnett
- Women's winner: (Minnesota) Team Johnson
- Curling club: Chaska CC, Chaska
- Skip: Allory Johnson
- Third: Gianna Johnson
- Second: Morgan Zacher
- Lead: Bailey Vaydich
- Alternate: Ella Wendling
- Finalist: (North Dakota) Christine McMakin

The 2025 United States Olympic Curling Team Pre-Trials were held from September 11 to 14. The men's event was held at the Charlotte Curling Association in Charlotte, North Carolina while the women's event took place at the Chaska Curling Center in Chaska, Minnesota. The event qualified one men's (Team Caden Hebert) and one women's team (Team Allory Johnson) for the 2025 United States Olympic Curling Trials in Sioux Falls.

== Qualification process ==
Any team in the Top 100 on the World Curling Team Rankings List at the conclusion of the 2024–25 season, not already qualified for the Olympic Team Trials, was invited. Five Men's teams and two Women's teams under that criteria elected to compete in the pre-trials.

=== Men ===
Men's teams:

1. (Minnesota) Wesley Wendling
2. (Minnesota) Chase Sinnett
3. (Pennsylvania) Scott Dunnam
4. (North Dakota) Timothy Hodek
5. (Wisconsin) Caden Hebert

=== Women ===
Women's teams:

1. (North Dakota) Christine McMakin
2. (Minnesota) Allory Johnson

== Men ==
=== Teams ===
The Teams are listed as follows:

Skip	Third	Second	Lead	Alternate	Locale
Scott Dunnam	Cody Clouser	Lance Wheeler	Andrew Dunnam		Philadelphia, Pennsylvania
Caden Hebert	Jackson Bestland	Benji Paral	Jack Wendtland		Eau Claire, Wisconsin
Timothy Hodek	Evan Workin	Josh Moore	Nathan Parry		Fargo, North Dakota
Samuel Strouse (Fourth)	Kevin Tuma	Chase Sinnett (Skip)	Connor Kauffman	Coleman Thurston	Minneapolis, Minnesota
Wesley Wendling	Ethan Sampson	Jake Zeman	Marius Kleinas		Chaska, Minnesota

=== Round robin standings ===
Final Round Robin Standings

Key
Team to 2025 United States Olympic Curling Trials

Team	W	L	W–L	DSC
(Wisconsin) Caden Hebert	3	1	–	54.30
(Minnesota) Chase Sinnett	2	2	1–1	20.83
(Pennsylvania) Scott Dunnam	2	2	1–1	43.37
(North Dakota) Timothy Hodek	2	2	1–1	49.83
(Minnesota) Wesley Wendling	1	3	–	30.77

=== Round robin results ===
All draw times are listed in Eastern Time (UTC−03:00).

==== Draw 1 ====
Thursday, September 11, 7:00 pm

Sheet B	1	2	3	4	5	6	7	8	9	10	11	Final
(Minnesota) Chase Sinnett	0	0	0	2	0	3	0	0	2	0	2	9
(Wisconsin) Caden Hebert	0	1	0	0	1	0	2	2	0	1	0	7

Sheet C	1	2	3	4	5	6	7	8	9	10	Final
(North Dakota) Timothy Hodek	0	2	0	0	0	0	0	X	X	X	2
(Pennsylvania) Scott Dunnam	2	0	2	0	1	3	1	X	X	X	9

==== Draw 2 ====
Friday, September 12, 12:00 pm

Sheet B	1	2	3	4	5	6	7	8	9	10	11	Final
(North Dakota) Timothy Hodek	1	0	0	0	2	0	2	0	2	0	1	8
(Minnesota) Chase Sinnett	0	1	0	2	0	2	0	0	0	2	0	7

Sheet C	1	2	3	4	5	6	7	8	9	10	11	Final
(Minnesota) Wesley Wendling	0	1	0	2	1	0	1	0	1	0	0	6
(Wisconsin) Caden Hebert	1	0	2	0	0	1	0	1	0	1	2	8

==== Draw 3 ====
Friday, September 12, 7:00 pm

Sheet B	1	2	3	4	5	6	7	8	9	10	Final
(Minnesota) Wesley Wendling	0	0	1	0	1	0	3	0	2	0	7
(North Dakota) Timothy Hodek	1	0	0	2	0	1	0	1	0	3	8

Sheet C	1	2	3	4	5	6	7	8	9	10	Final
(Pennsylvania) Scott Dunnam	0	1	2	0	0	1	1	0	0	0	5
(Minnesota) Chase Sinnett	2	0	0	2	0	0	0	2	1	2	9

==== Draw 4 ====
Saturday, September 13, 12:00 pm

Sheet B	1	2	3	4	5	6	7	8	9	10	11	Final
(Pennsylvania) Scott Dunnam	0	1	0	0	3	0	1	2	0	0	2	9
(Minnesota) Wesley Wendling	0	0	1	2	0	2	0	0	1	1	0	7

Sheet C	1	2	3	4	5	6	7	8	9	10	11	Final
(Wisconsin) Caden Hebert	0	0	1	1	1	1	1	0	2	0	2	9
(North Dakota) Timothy Hodek	2	1	0	0	0	0	0	2	0	2	0	7

==== Draw 5 ====
Saturday, September 13, 7:00 pm

Sheet D	1	2	3	4	5	6	7	8	9	10	Final
(Wisconsin) Caden Hebert	2	0	0	2	5	0	1	0	0	X	10
(Pennsylvania) Scott Dunnam	0	2	1	0	0	1	0	2	0	X	6

Sheet E	1	2	3	4	5	6	7	8	9	10	Final
(Minnesota) Chase Sinnett	1	0	2	0	1	0	0	0	0	0	4
(Minnesota) Wesley Wendling	0	1	0	2	0	1	0	1	0	2	7

== Women ==
=== Teams ===
The teams are listed as follows:

Skip	Third	Second	Lead	Alternate	Locale
Allory Johnson	Gianna Johnson	Morgan Zacher	Bailey Vaydich	Ella Wendling	Chaska, Minnesota
Christine McMakin	Miranda Scheel	Jenna Burchesky	Rebecca Rodgers		Fargo, North Dakota

=== Standings ===
Best-of-five
(Minnesota) Allory Johnson	8	4	9	8	10
(North Dakota) Christine McMakin	4	8	6	10	4

=== Results ===
All draw times are listed in Eastern Time (UTC−03:00).

==== Game 1 ====
Friday, September 12, 9:00 am

Sheet 1	1	2	3	4	5	6	7	8	9	10	Final
(North Dakota) Christine McMakin	0	2	0	1	0	1	0	0	0	X	4
(Minnesota) Allory Johnson	0	0	1	0	1	0	3	2	1	X	8

==== Game 2 ====
Friday, September 12, 3:00 pm

Sheet 1	1	2	3	4	5	6	7	8	9	10	Final
(Minnesota) Allory Johnson	0	1	0	0	1	1	1	0	0	X	4
(North Dakota) Christine McMakin	2	0	2	1	0	0	0	1	2	X	8

==== Game 3 ====
Saturday, September 13, 9:00 am

Sheet 1	1	2	3	4	5	6	7	8	9	10	Final
(North Dakota) Christine McMakin	3	0	1	0	0	1	0	1	0	0	6
(Minnesota) Allory Johnson	0	2	0	2	1	0	2	0	1	1	9

==== Game 4 ====
Saturday, September 13, 3:00 pm

Sheet 1	1	2	3	4	5	6	7	8	9	10	Final
(Minnesota) Allory Johnson	0	2	0	3	0	0	1	0	2	0	8
(North Dakota) Christine McMakin	2	0	1	0	2	2	0	2	0	1	10

==== Game 5 ====
Sunday, September 14, 10:00 am

Sheet 1	1	2	3	4	5	6	7	8	9	10	Final
(North Dakota) Christine McMakin	1	0	1	0	0	2	0	0	X	X	4
(Minnesota) Allory Johnson	0	2	0	2	1	0	2	3	X	X	10
