= Dominik Märki =

Swiss-American curler (born 1990)

- Curler
- Born: October 9, 1990 (age 36); Bern, Switzerland

Team
- Curling club: Fairbanks Curling Club; Fairbanks, Alaska
- Skip: Jason Smith
- Third: Dominik Märki
- Second: Jared Allen
- Lead: Hunter Clawson

Curling career
- World Championship: 1 (2014)
- European Championship: 1 (2017)
- Olympic: 1 (2018)
Medal record
Men's Curling
Representing Switzerland
Olympic Games
Bronze medal – third place	2018 Pyeongchang	Team
World Championships
Bronze medal – third place	2014 Beijing
European Championships
Bronze medal – third place	2017 St Gallen

Dominik Märki (born 9 October 1990) is a Swiss-American curler, currently living in Fayetteville, Arkansas. He currently plays third on Team Jason Smith.

He competed in the 2018 Winter Olympics, where he won a bronze medal as alternate for the Swiss team.

At his first United States National Championship in 2020, Märki skipped his team to a fourth place finish.
