= Matt Hamilton (curler) =

American curler (born 1989)

- Curler
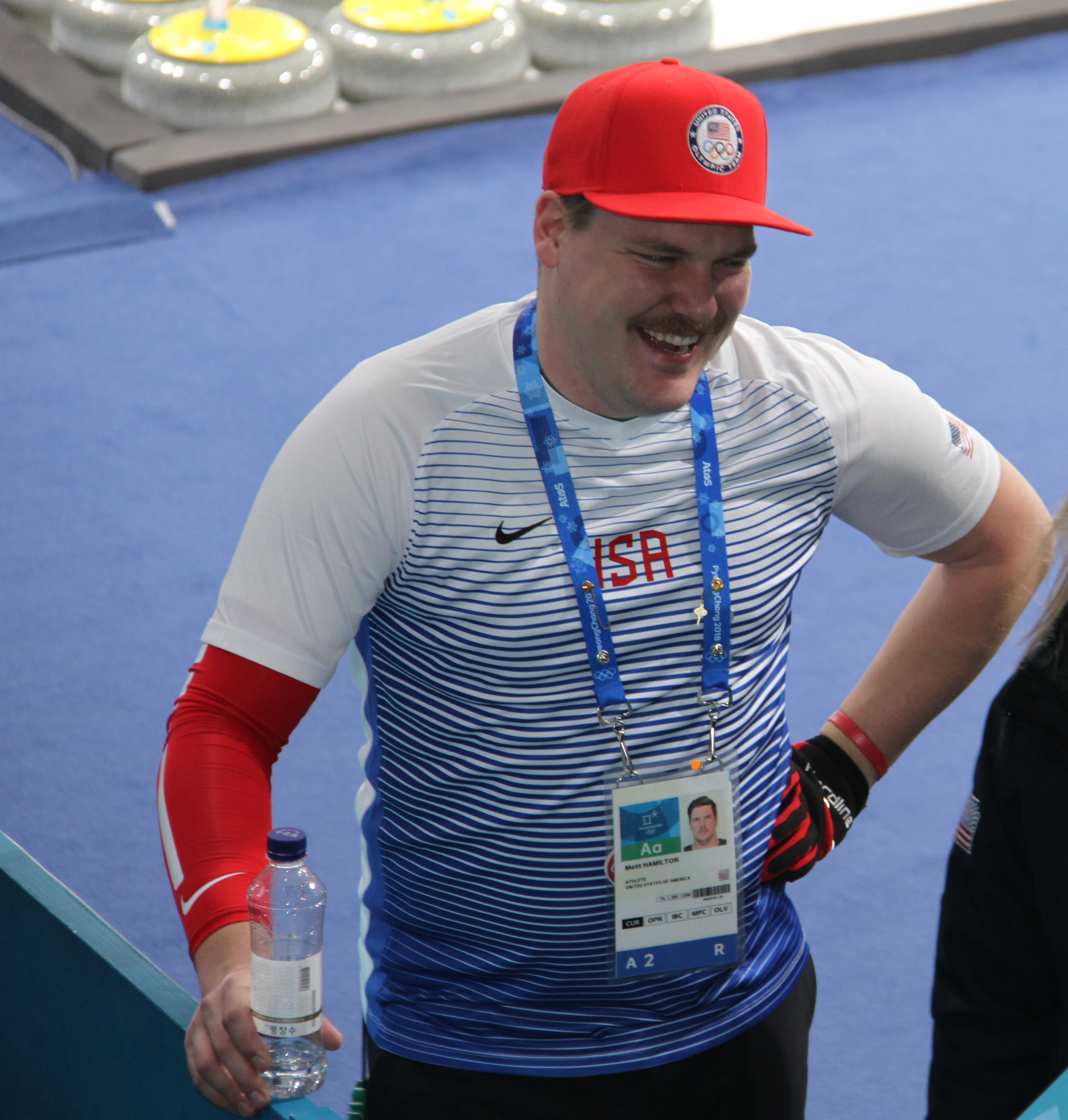
- Hamilton at the 2018 Winter Olympics
- Other names: Matthew James Hamilton
- Born: February 19, 1989 (age 37); Madison, Wisconsin, U.S.
- Height: 6 ft 2 in (188 cm)

Team
- Curling club: Madison CC, McFarland, WI
- Mixed doubles partner: Becca Hamilton

Curling career
- Member Association: United States
- World Championship: 8 (2015, 2016, 2017, 2019, 2021, 2023, 2024, 2026)
- World Mixed Doubles Championship: 3 (2017, 2022, 2024)
- Pan Continental Championship: 2 (2024, 2025)
- Olympic: 2 (2018, 2022)
Medal record
Men's curling
Representing United States
Winter Olympics
Gold medal – first place	2018 Pyeongchang	Team
World Championships
Bronze medal – third place	2016 Basel
Pan Continental Championships
Silver medal – second place	2025 Virginia
Bronze medal – third place	2024 Lacombe
World Junior Championships
Gold medal – first place	2008 Östersund
Bronze medal – third place	2009 Vancouver
Representing Minnesota
US Olympic Trials
Gold medal – first place	2017 Omaha
Gold medal – first place	2021 Omaha
Silver medal – second place	2025 Sioux Falls
US Men's Championship
Gold medal – first place	2015 Kalamazoo
Gold medal – first place	2017 Everett
Gold medal – first place	2019 Kalamazoo
Gold medal – first place	2020 Cheney
Gold medal – first place	2023 Denver
Gold medal – first place	2024 East Rutherford
Gold medal – first place	2026 Charlotte
Silver medal – second place	2014 Philadelphia
Silver medal – second place	2016 Jacksonville
Bronze medal – third place	2025 Duluth
US Mixed Doubles Olympic Trials
Gold medal – first place	2017 Blaine
US Mixed Doubles Championship
Gold medal – first place	2017 Blaine
Gold medal – first place	2022 Middleton
Gold medal – first place	2024 Traverse City

Matthew James Hamilton (born February 19, 1989) is an American curler from McFarland, Wisconsin. He is a World Junior Champion, World Men's bronze medalist, and Olympic gold medalist.

== Curling career ==
=== 2007–2014: Early career ===
Hamilton played for skip Jeremy Roe at the 2007 and 2008 United States Men's National Championships, placing seventh and ninth, respectively. In 2008 he also joined Chris Plys' junior team, who had won the National Junior Championship the two previous years. Hamilton helped make it four Junior National Titles in a row for Plys, winning the 2008 and 2009 championships.

As national champions, Hamilton and Team Plys represented the United States at the World Junior Championships. At the 2008 World Juniors in Östersund, Sweden they took home gold medals after beating Sweden's Oskar Eriksson 9–5 in the final. While in Sweden, Hamilton won the championship's 2008 Sportsmanship Award, an award only given to one male junior curler and one female junior curler.

The following year, at the 2009 World Junior Championships held in the newly completed Vancouver Olympic Centre, they failed to defend their title, ending up with bronze medals. Hamilton and his juniors team also competed at the 2009 United States Olympic Trials, which doubled as that year's national championship, finishing in eighth place with a 3–6 record.

For the 2009–10 season Hamilton returned to Jeremy Roe's team, as third.

In the stages leading up to the 2011 United States Men's Curling Championship, he played as Paul Pustovar's second through the Medford qualifier and the challenge round, eventually qualifying for the Nationals. He replaced Pustovar as skip in the Nationals and finished seventh with a 3–6 win–loss record.

Starting with the 2011–12 curling season, Hamilton joined Craig Brown at third for three seasons. This stint culminated with a silver medal at the 2014 National Championship, Hamilton's first men's championship medal.

=== 2014–2018: Gold with Team Shuster ===
After the 2014 Winter Olympics, the United States Curling Association held an athlete combine to determine which curlers to include in their High Performance Program (HPP) aimed at having better success at the next Olympics. Hamilton attended the combine but was not chosen as one of the ten male HPP curlers. John Shuster, three-time Olympian at that point, was also not chosen and, in response, created a new team nicknamed "The Rejects", bringing on Hamilton at second, fellow Olympian and combine reject John Landsteiner at lead, and Tyler George at third, who hadn't attended the combine due to his work. They maintained this line-up for four seasons and found great success. At their first National Championships together in 2015, they defeated Hamilton's former skip Brown in the final to win the gold medal. Representing the United States at the 2015 World Championship in Halifax, Nova Scotia, Team Shuster missed out on the playoffs when they lost a tiebreaker to Finland's Aku Kauste. As a result of its success, Team Shuster was added to the High Performance Program for 2016.

Hamilton and his team came up just short of defending their national title in 2016, losing to Brady Clark in the final. Despite finishing in second, Team Shuster earned enough points throughout the season to secure their return trip to the World Championship. In Basel, Switzerland they defeated Japan's Yusuke Morozumi in the bronze medal match, earning the first World Men's medal for the United States since 2007. For the 2016–17 season they added Joe Polo, a former teammate of Shuster and George, as alternate and won the 2017 National Championship. At the 2017 World Championship, their third Worlds in a row, they lost in the bronze medal game against Team Switzerland, skipped by Peter de Cruz. Hamilton attended a second world curling championship this season, representing the United States at the 2017 World Mixed Doubles Championship after he and his sister and doubles partner Becca Hamilton won the US Championship. At the Worlds in Lethbridge, Alberta, they won their group during the round-robin phase and were the second seed going into the playoffs but ultimately ended in tenth place.

Early in his fourth season on Team Shuster, Hamilton won the 2017 United States Olympic Curling Trials with them and then a month later won the 2017 United States Mixed Doubles Curling Olympic Trials with Becca, earning his spot in both curling disciplines for his first Olympics.

In the 2018 Winter Olympics in PyeongChang, the US team lost four of its first six matches and needed to win all of its three remaining matches to qualify for the playoffs, but all of its remaining opponents (Canada, Switzerland, and Great Britain) were currently among the top four teams. Nevertheless, the US team won all three matches to finish the round-robin in third place with a record of 5–4. In the semifinals, they defeated Canada's Kevin Koe, a two-time world champion, to reach the gold-medal match versus Niklas Edin's team representing Sweden. The gold-medal game was close through seven ends, with the score tied 5–5, but the United States scored five in the eighth end to set up a 10–7 victory. This was the first Olympic gold medal in curling for the United States. In the mixed doubles competition, the Hamilton siblings did not fare as well, finishing in sixth place with a 2–5 record.

=== 2018–present: Post-Olympics ===
After the Olympics, George took a break from competitive curling, and Team Shuster replaced him at third with Chris Plys. The slightly revamped team continued winning, taking gold at the 2019 United States Men's Championship. At the 2019 World Men's Championship, they finished in fifth place, having lost to Japan in the first round of playoffs. They defended their United States title at the 2020 United States Men's Championship, defeating Rich Ruohonen in the final to finish the tournament undefeated. The national title would have earned Team Shuster a spot at the final Grand Slam of the season, the Champions Cup, as well as the chance to represent the United States at the 2020 World Men's Curling Championship, but both events were cancelled due to the COVID-19 pandemic.

Team Shuster represented the United States at the 2021 World Men's Curling Championship, which was played in a fan-less bubble in Calgary due to the ongoing COVID-19 pandemic. There, the team led the U.S. to a 10–3 round robin record, in third place. They played Switzerland in the playoffs, in a game which was delayed a day due to some curlers testing positive for the virus. In the game, Switzerland, skipped by Peter de Cruz, beat the Americans to advance to the semifinals.

== Personal life ==
Hamilton is a former research and development technician for Spectrum Brands. He currently works for ESPN as a radio host. He is married and resides in McFarland, Wisconsin. His sister, Becca Hamilton, is also an elite curler. She played with Nina Roth in the women's event at the 2018 Winter Olympics, as well as with Matt in the mixed doubles event.

Hamilton gained notoriety on Twitter after tweets comparing him to video game character Mario in 2018 and Formula One driver Valtteri Bottas in 2022 surfaced.

== Teams ==
=== Men's ===
Season	Skip	Third	Second	Lead	Alternate	Coach	Events
2006–07	Jeremy Roe	Matt Hamilton	Scott Templeton	Mark Hartman	Kroy Nernberger		2007 USMCC (7th)
2007–08	Chris Plys	Aanders Brorson	Matt Perushek	Matt Hamilton	Daniel Plys	Phill Drobnick	2008 USJCC (gold); 2008 WJCC (gold)
2007–08	Jeremy Roe	Patrick Roe	Richard Maskel	Mark Hartman	Matt Hamilton		2008 USMCC (9th)
2008–09	Chris Plys	Aanders Brorson	Matt Perushek	Matt Hamilton	Aaron Wald	Phill Drobnick	2009 USJCC (gold); 2009 WJCC (bronze)
2008–09	Chris Plys	Aanders Brorson	Matt Perushek	Matt Hamilton	Phill Drobnick		2009 USMCC/USOCT (9th)
2009–10	Jeremy Roe	Matt Hamilton	Patrick Roe	Tom Gabower			
2010–11	Matt Hamilton	Jeremy Roe	Joseph Bonfoey	Patrick Roe	Paul Pustovar		2011 USMCC (7th)
2011–12	Craig Brown	Matt Hamilton	Kroy Nernberger	Derrick Casper			2012 USMCC (4th)
2013–14	Craig Brown	Kroy Nernberger	Matt Hamilton	Jon Brunt			2013 USMCC (7th)
2013–14	Craig Brown	Kroy Nernberger	Matt Hamilton	Jon Brunt			2014 USMCC (silver)
2014–15	John Shuster	Tyler George	Matt Hamilton	John Landsteiner	Craig Brown (WMCC)	Pete Fenson	2015 USMCC (gold); 2015 WMCC (5th)
2015–16	John Shuster	Tyler George	Matt Hamilton	John Landsteiner	Kroy Nernberger (WMCC)	Phill Drobnick	2016 USMCC (silver); 2016 WMCC (bronze)
2016–17	John Shuster	Tyler George	Matt Hamilton	John Landsteiner	Joe Polo	Phill Drobnick	2017 USMCC (gold); 2017 WMCC (4th)
2017–18	John Shuster	Tyler George	Matt Hamilton	John Landsteiner	Joe Polo	Phill Drobnick	2017 USOCT (gold); 2018 OG (gold)
2018–19	John Shuster	Chris Plys	Matt Hamilton	John Landsteiner	Korey Dropkin (WMCC)	Derek Brown	CWC/2 (gold); 2019 USMCC (gold); 2019 WMCC (5th); CWC/GF (6th)
2019–20	John Shuster	Chris Plys	Matt Hamilton	John Landsteiner		Sean Beighton	2020 USMCC (gold)
2020–21	John Shuster	Chris Plys	Matt Hamilton	John Landsteiner	Colin Hufman	Sean Beighton	2021 WMCC (5th)
2021–22	John Shuster	Chris Plys	Matt Hamilton	John Landsteiner	Colin Hufman		2021 USOCT (gold); 2022 OG (4th)
2022–23	John Shuster	Chris Plys	Matt Hamilton	John Landsteiner	Colin Hufman	Phil Drobnick	2023 USMCC (gold); 2023 WMCC (8th)
2023–24	John Shuster	Chris Plys	Colin Hufman	Matt Hamilton	John Landsteiner	Theran Michaelis	2024 USMCC (gold); 2024 WMCC (6th)
2024–25	John Shuster	Chris Plys	Colin Hufman	Matt Hamilton	John Landsteiner	Theran Michaelis	2024 PCCC (bronze); 2025 USMCC (bronze)
2025–26	John Shuster	Chris Plys	Colin Hufman	Matt Hamilton	Daniel Casper (PCCC); Aidan Oldenburg (WMCC)	Theran Michaelis	2025 PCCC (silver); 2026 USMCC (gold); 2026 WMCC (4th)

=== Mixed doubles ===
Season	Female	Male	Events
2015–16	Becca Hamilton	Matt Hamilton	2016 US World Trials (4th)
2016–17	Becca Hamilton	Matt Hamilton	2017 USMDCC (gold); 2017 WMDCC (10th)
2017–18	Becca Hamilton	Matt Hamilton	2017 USMDOT (gold); 2018 OG (6th)
2018–19	Becca Hamilton	Matt Hamilton	2019 USMDCC (QF)
2019–20	Becca Hamilton	Matt Hamilton	2020 USMDCC (QF)
2020–21	Becca Hamilton	Matt Hamilton	
2021–22	Becca Hamilton	Matt Hamilton	2021 USMDOT (5th); 2022 USMDCC (gold); 2022 WMDCC (8th)
2022–23	Becca Hamilton	Matt Hamilton	2023 USMDCC (5th)
2023–24	Becca Hamilton	Matt Hamilton	2024 USMDCC (gold); 2024 WMDCC (10th)
2024–25	Becca Hamilton	Matt Hamilton	2025 USMDOT (7th)
2026–27	Becca Hamilton	Matt Hamilton	
