= Matt Perushek =

American curler

Matthew Perushek
- Curler
- Born: December 8, 1987 (age 38); Eveleth, Minnesota, U.S.
Medal record
Curling
Representing United States
World Junior Championships
Gold medal – first place	2008 Östersund
Bronze medal – third place	2009 Vancouver

Matthew Perushek (born December 8, 1987) is an American curler. He played second on Chris Plys' team that won the 2008 World Junior Curling Championship.

== Curling career ==
Perushek started curling in 1995. With teammates Chris Plys and Aanders Brorson, he won the Minnesota Junior State Championship in 2007, 2008, and 2009. Each of those years his team continued on to win the United States Junior Championship. He won the "All-Star Second" award at the 2008 and 2009 U.S. Junior National Championships. Winning the United States Junior Championships earned Perushek the chance to compete in three World Junior Championships. In 2007, in Eveleth, Minnesota, his home town and home club, they finished in fifth place when they lost a tiebreaker to Denmark's Rasmus Stjerne. The following year, now with Matt Hamilton at lead, World's was in Östersund, Sweden and after finishing the round-robin with a 7–2 record they defeated the number one seed Canada in the semifinals and the number two seed Sweden, skipped by Oskar Eriksson, in the final to win the gold medal. The same team returned to the World Junior Championships one more time in 2009, in Vancouver, where they beat Sweden's Eriksson to win the bronze medal. They also played at the U.S. Olympic Trials in 2009, placing seventh.
