= 2021 United States Mixed Doubles Curling Championship =

- Host city: Wausau, Wisconsin
- Arena: Wausau Curling Club
- Dates: May 19–23
- Winner: (Alaska) (Minnesota) Persinger / Plys
- Female: Vicky Persinger
- Male: Chris Plys
- Finalist: (Minnesota) Bear / Stopera

The 2021 United States Mixed Doubles Curling Championship was held from May 19 to 23, 2021 at the Wausau Curling Club in Wausau, Wisconsin. The championship featured twenty four teams split into four pools of six. After the round robin, the top two teams from each pool qualified for the playoffs with the first place teams advancing to the seeding round.

In the final, the pair of Vicky Persinger and Chris Plys defeated Madison Bear and Andrew Stopera 8–5 to claim the title. It was a first mixed doubles championship for both Persinger and Plys, having finished runner–up in 2019 to the duo of Cory Christensen and John Shuster. Bear and Stopera went a perfect 7–0 in the tournament before dropping the final. To advance to the final, Persinger and Plys defeated the duo of Aileen Geving and Luc Violette 8–5 and Bear and Stopera topped Jenna Burchesky and Ben Richardson 7–2. All four teams that qualified for the semifinals qualified their teams for the 2021 United States Mixed Doubles Curling Olympic Trials which will be held in fall 2021.

== Impact of the COVID-19 pandemic ==
The event was originally scheduled to be held February 28 to March 6, 2021 at Great Park Ice & FivePoint Arena in Irvine, California and also be the Mixed Doubles Olympic Trials for the 2022 Winter Olympics. In December, 2020, the USCA announced that all remaining 2020–21 events would be either cancelled or postponed until late spring 2021. This postponement delayed the Mixed Doubles Championship until after the 2021 World Mixed Doubles Championship and so the 2020 champions, Tabitha Peterson and Joe Polo, were selected to represent the United States. This gave the team the opportunity to compete at Worlds which they missed the previous year when the 2020 World Mixed Doubles Championship was cancelled due to the COVID-19 pandemic. On March 29, 2021 it was announced that the 2021 Mixed Doubles Championship would be held in conjunction with the Women's Nationals and Men's Nationals in a bio-secure bubble at Wausau Curling Club in Wausau, Wisconsin in May, 2021. Due to the pandemic, it was decided to separate the 2021 Mixed Doubles Olympic Trials from the National Championship and delay the trials until fall 2021.

== Qualification ==
Due to the pandemic, no qualification events were held and the qualification methods were modified. Any team that had qualified for the 2020 United States Mixed Doubles Curling Championship qualified for the event. Then, up to twelve teams that had at least one athlete in the top fifty of the World Curling Federation's men's and women's rankings qualified. The remaining spots were selected by the top teams, not already qualified, from the WCF Mixed Doubles World Team Ranking System as of the close of registration.

== Teams ==
The teams competing in the 2021 championship are:

Female	Male	Locale
Taylor Anderson	Hunter Clawson	Philadelphia, Pennsylvania
Nicole Avalon	Sean Franey	Oakland, California
Madison Bear	Andrew Stopera	Chaska, Minnesota
Nicole Bookhout	Dan Wiza	Madison, Wisconsin
Jenna Burchesky	Ben Richardson	Walpole, Massachusetts
Susan Dudt	Daniel Dudt	Philadelphia, Pennsylvania
Audrey Foote	Blake Hagberg	(New York (state)) Whitesboro, New York
Aileen Geving	Luc Violette	Duluth, Minnesota
Christine McMakin	Riley Fenson	Chaska, Minnesota
Clare Moores	Lance Wheeler	Denver, Colorado
Sydney Mullaney	Chase Sinnett	Concord, Massachusetts
Anne O'Hara	Coleman Thurston	Fairbanks, Alaska
Abigail Page	Aiden Oldenburg	Mankato, Minnesota
Vicky Persinger	Chris Plys	Fairbanks, Alaska / Chaska, Minnesota
Ann Podoll	Nathan Perry	Fargo, North Dakota
Kim Rhyme	Jason Smith	Saint Paul, Minnesota
Rebecca Rodgers	Daniel Casper	Leyden, Massachusetts
Harley Rohrbacher	Nicholas Visnich	Pittsburgh, Pennsylvania
Jamie Sinclair	Rich Ruohonen	Chaska, Minnesota
Maureen Stolt	Peter Stolt	Plymouth, Minnesota
Delaney Strouse	Nicholas Connolly	(Minnesota) Midland, Michigan
Monica Walker	Alex Leichter	Wayland, Massachusetts
Becca Wood	Shawn Banyai	Denver, Colorado
Leah Yavarow	Samuel Strouse	(Minnesota) Midland, Michigan

== Round-robin standings ==
Final round-robin standings

Key
Teams to playoffs
Teams to tiebreakers

Pool A	W	L
(Alaska) (Minnesota) Persinger / Plys	4	1
(Massachusetts) Burchesky / Richardson	3	2
(Minnesota) McMakin / Fenson	3	2
(New York (state)) Foote / Hagberg	2	3
(Alaska) O'Hara / Thurston	2	3
(Massachusetts) Rodgers / Casper	1	4

Pool B	W	L
(Minnesota) Rhyme / Smith	4	1
(Colorado) Moores / Wheeler	3	2
(Massachusetts) Walker / Leichter	3	2
(Massachusetts) Mullaney / Sinnett	3	2
(North Dakota) Podoll / Parry	1	4
(Pennsylvania) Rohrbacher / Visnich	1	4

Pool C	W	L
(Minnesota) Bear / Stopera	5	0
(Pennsylvania) Dudt / Dudt	4	1
(Pennsylvania) Anderson / Clawson	3	2
(Minnesota) Stolt / Stolt	1	4
(Michigan) Strouse / Connolly	1	4
(California) Avalon / Franey	1	4

Pool D	W	L
(Minnesota) Geving / Violette	5	0
(Minnesota) Sinclair / Ruohonen	4	1
(Minnesota) Page / Oldenburg	3	2
(Michigan) Yavarow / Strouse	2	3
(Colorado) Wood / Banyai	1	4
(Wisconsin) Bookhout / Wiza	0	5

== Round-robin results ==
All draw times are listed in Central Daylight Time (UTC−05:00).

=== Draw 1 ===
Wednesday, May 19, 5:30 pm

Sheet 2	1	2	3	4	5	6	7	8	Final
(Minnesota) McMakin / Fenson	1	0	4	0	2	2	2	X	11
(Massachusetts) Rodgers / Casper 🔨	0	2	0	2	0	0	0	X	4

Sheet 3	1	2	3	4	5	6	7	8	Final
(New York (state)) Foote / Hagberg	0	1	0	0	0	1	X	X	2
(Alaska) (Minnesota) Persinger / Plys 🔨	2	0	5	3	2	0	X	X	12

Sheet 4	1	2	3	4	5	6	7	8	Final
(Massachusetts) Burchesky / Richardson 🔨	3	0	1	2	1	0	3	X	10
(Alaska) O'Hara / Thurston	0	1	0	0	0	2	0	X	3

Sheet 5	1	2	3	4	5	6	7	8	Final
(Pennsylvania) Rohrbacher / Visnich	1	0	0	0	0	1	0	X	2
(Massachusetts) Walker / Leichter 🔨	0	1	1	1	1	0	5	X	9

Sheet 6	1	2	3	4	5	6	7	8	9	Final
(Massachusetts) Mullaney / Sinnett 🔨	1	1	0	1	0	2	0	2	0	7
(Colorado) Moores / Wheeler	0	0	2	0	1	0	4	0	4	11

Sheet 7	1	2	3	4	5	6	7	8	Final
(Minnesota) Rhyme / Smith 🔨	2	0	2	0	3	0	3	1	11
(North Dakota) Podoll / Parry	0	2	0	1	0	4	0	0	7

=== Draw 2 ===
Wednesday, May 19, 8:30 pm

Sheet 2	1	2	3	4	5	6	7	8	Final
(Minnesota) Stolt / Stolt	0	1	1	0	1	2	2	0	7
(Michigan) Strouse / Connolly 🔨	3	0	0	1	0	0	0	4	8

Sheet 3	1	2	3	4	5	6	7	8	Final
(California) Avalon / Franey 🔨	0	2	0	0	3	0	0	X	5
(Minnesota) Bear / Stopera	3	0	1	2	0	1	2	X	9

Sheet 4	1	2	3	4	5	6	7	8	Final
(Pennsylvania) Anderson / Clawson 🔨	0	0	0	0	1	1	0	2	4
(Pennsylvania) Dudt / Dudt	1	1	1	1	0	0	1	0	5

Sheet 5	1	2	3	4	5	6	7	8	Final
(Minnesota) Page / Oldenburg	0	2	0	1	2	0	1	0	6
(Minnesota) Sinclair / Ruohonen 🔨	3	0	2	0	0	2	0	2	9

Sheet 6	1	2	3	4	5	6	7	8	Final
(Michigan) Yavarow / Strouse 🔨	1	0	0	2	2	1	3	X	9
(Colorado) Wood / Banyai	0	1	1	0	0	0	0	X	2

Sheet 7	1	2	3	4	5	6	7	8	Final
(Minnesota) Geving / Violette 🔨	2	0	0	4	1	1	1	X	9
(Wisconsin) Bookhout / Wiza	0	3	2	0	0	0	0	X	5

=== Draw 3 ===
Thursday, May 20, 9:00 am

Sheet 2	1	2	3	4	5	6	7	8	Final
(Pennsylvania) Rohrbacher / Visnich 🔨	0	1	0	0	1	0	2	X	4
(Massachusetts) Mullaney / Sinnett	1	0	1	2	0	4	0	X	8

Sheet 3	1	2	3	4	5	6	7	8	Final
(Colorado) Moores / Wheeler 🔨	1	0	1	0	3	0	2	0	7
(Minnesota) Rhyme / Smith	0	1	0	2	0	3	0	2	8

Sheet 4	1	2	3	4	5	6	7	8	Final
(Massachusetts) Walker / Leichter 🔨	0	3	0	1	2	2	1	X	9
(North Dakota) Podoll / Parry	2	0	1	0	0	0	0	X	3

Sheet 5	1	2	3	4	5	6	7	8	Final
(Massachusetts) Rodgers / Casper	0	0	0	0	0	1	X	X	1
(Massachusetts) Burchesky / Richardson 🔨	2	2	1	1	1	0	X	X	7

Sheet 6	1	2	3	4	5	6	7	8	Final
(Alaska) (Minnesota) Persinger / Plys 🔨	2	0	0	0	3	1	0	1	7
(Alaska) O'Hara / Thurston	0	3	2	1	0	0	2	0	8

Sheet 7	1	2	3	4	5	6	7	8	Final
(New York (state)) Foote / Hagberg	1	1	0	1	0	0	1	1	5
(Minnesota) McMakin / Fenson 🔨	0	0	4	0	1	1	0	0	6

=== Draw 4 ===
Thursday, May 20, 12:00 pm

Sheet 2	1	2	3	4	5	6	7	8	Final
(Minnesota) Page / Oldenburg	0	1	0	1	0	5	1	1	9
(Michigan) Yavarow / Strouse 🔨	1	0	2	0	1	0	0	0	4

Sheet 3	1	2	3	4	5	6	7	8	Final
(Colorado) Wood / Banyai 🔨	2	0	1	0	0	1	0	X	4
(Minnesota) Geving / Violette	0	4	0	1	1	0	2	X	8

Sheet 4	1	2	3	4	5	6	7	8	Final
(Minnesota) Sinclair / Ruohonen	0	0	3	0	0	2	0	1	6
(Wisconsin) Bookhout / Wiza 🔨	1	1	0	1	1	0	1	0	5

Sheet 5	1	2	3	4	5	6	7	8	Final
(Michigan) Strouse / Connolly	0	0	0	0	2	0	X	X	2
(Pennsylvania) Anderson / Clawson 🔨	3	2	3	1	0	4	X	X	13

Sheet 6	1	2	3	4	5	6	7	8	Final
(Minnesota) Bear / Stopera 🔨	2	3	0	3	3	0	X	X	11
(Pennsylvania) Dudt / Dudt	0	0	1	0	0	1	X	X	2

Sheet 7	1	2	3	4	5	6	7	8	Final
(California) Avalon / Franey	0	0	0	0	1	0	0	X	1
(Minnesota) Stolt / Stolt 🔨	2	1	1	1	0	2	2	X	9

=== Draw 5 ===
Thursday, May 20, 4:00 pm

Sheet 2	1	2	3	4	5	6	7	8	9	Final
(New York (state)) Foote / Hagberg 🔨	2	0	0	4	0	3	0	0	1	10
(Alaska) O'Hara / Thurston	0	2	2	0	1	0	2	2	0	9

Sheet 3	1	2	3	4	5	6	7	8	Final
(Minnesota) McMakin / Fenson 🔨	0	0	4	1	0	1	0	0	6
(Massachusetts) Burchesky / Richardson	2	2	0	0	2	0	2	1	9

Sheet 4	1	2	3	4	5	6	7	8	Final
(Alaska) (Minnesota) Persinger / Plys	1	0	3	1	1	2	X	X	8
(Massachusetts) Rodgers / Casper 🔨	0	1	0	0	0	0	X	X	1

Sheet 5	1	2	3	4	5	6	7	8	Final
(Massachusetts) Mullaney / Sinnett	0	3	0	1	2	0	3	X	9
(Minnesota) Rhyme / Smith 🔨	2	0	1	0	0	1	0	X	4

Sheet 6	1	2	3	4	5	6	7	8	Final
(Pennsylvania) Rohrbacher / Visnich	2	0	0	0	1	0	0	X	3
(North Dakota) Podoll / Parry 🔨	0	2	1	1	0	2	2	X	8

Sheet 7	1	2	3	4	5	6	7	8	Final
(Massachusetts) Walker / Leichter 🔨	1	0	0	1	1	0	1	0	4
(Colorado) Moores / Wheeler	0	2	1	0	0	4	0	1	8

=== Draw 6 ===
Thursday, May 20, 7:00 pm

Sheet 2	1	2	3	4	5	6	7	8	9	Final
(California) Avalon / Franey 🔨	1	0	1	0	1	0	2	1	0	6
(Pennsylvania) Dudt / Dudt	0	4	0	1	0	1	0	0	2	8

Sheet 3	1	2	3	4	5	6	7	8	Final
(Minnesota) Stolt / Stolt	0	1	0	0	0	0	0	X	1
(Pennsylvania) Anderson / Clawson 🔨	1	0	1	1	1	3	1	X	8

Sheet 4	1	2	3	4	5	6	7	8	Final
(Minnesota) Bear / Stopera	4	1	0	2	0	2	0	X	9
(Michigan) Strouse / Connolly 🔨	0	0	3	0	1	0	3	X	7

Sheet 5	1	2	3	4	5	6	7	8	Final
(Michigan) Yavarow / Strouse 🔨	0	0	1	0	0	0	1	X	2
(Minnesota) Geving / Violette	1	2	0	1	1	1	0	X	6

Sheet 6	1	2	3	4	5	6	7	8	Final
(Minnesota) Page / Oldenburg 🔨	4	0	2	0	3	1	X	X	10
(Wisconsin) Bookhout / Wiza	0	1	0	1	0	0	X	X	2

Sheet 7	1	2	3	4	5	6	7	8	Final
(Minnesota) Sinclair / Ruohonen	1	0	2	1	0	4	0	X	8
(Colorado) Wood / Banyai 🔨	0	2	0	0	1	0	1	X	4

=== Draw 7 ===
Friday, May 21, 9:00 am

Sheet 2	1	2	3	4	5	6	7	8	Final
(North Dakota) Podoll / Parry	0	0	0	1	0	0	0	X	1
(Colorado) Moores / Wheeler 🔨	2	1	1	0	2	1	1	X	8

Sheet 3	1	2	3	4	5	6	7	8	Final
(Massachusetts) Mullaney / Sinnett 🔨	0	0	0	0	1	1	2	X	4
(Massachusetts) Walker / Leichter	1	2	1	3	0	0	0	X	7

Sheet 4	1	2	3	4	5	6	7	8	Final
(Minnesota) Rhyme / Smith 🔨	1	3	0	4	0	3	0	X	11
(Pennsylvania) Rohrbacher / Visnich	0	0	2	0	1	0	3	X	6

Sheet 5	1	2	3	4	5	6	7	8	Final
(Minnesota) McMakin / Fenson 🔨	0	0	1	0	1	0	3	0	5
(Alaska) (Minnesota) Persinger / Plys	2	2	0	1	0	1	0	1	7

Sheet 6	1	2	3	4	5	6	7	8	9	Final
(Massachusetts) Burchesky / Richardson 🔨	0	0	4	0	0	3	0	1	0	8
(New York (state)) Foote / Hagberg	2	2	0	1	2	0	1	0	1	9

Sheet 7	1	2	3	4	5	6	7	8	Final
(Alaska) O'Hara / Thurston	1	0	1	0	3	0	3	1	9
(Massachusetts) Rodgers / Casper 🔨	0	2	0	3	0	1	0	0	6

=== Draw 8 ===
Friday, May 21, 12:00 pm

Sheet 2	1	2	3	4	5	6	7	8	Final
(Wisconsin) Bookhout / Wiza 🔨	0	1	0	0	1	0	X	X	2
(Colorado) Wood / Banyai	2	0	6	1	0	1	X	X	10

Sheet 3	1	2	3	4	5	6	7	8	Final
(Michigan) Yavarow / Strouse 🔨	0	1	0	1	1	0	1	X	4
(Minnesota) Sinclair / Ruohonen	1	0	3	0	0	2	0	X	6

Sheet 4	1	2	3	4	5	6	7	8	Final
(Minnesota) Geving / Violette 🔨	0	2	0	2	0	0	3	1	8
(Minnesota) Page / Oldenburg	2	0	2	0	1	1	0	0	6

Sheet 5	1	2	3	4	5	6	7	8	Final
(Minnesota) Stolt / Stolt	0	0	2	0	0	0	X	X	2
(Minnesota) Bear / Stopera 🔨	2	1	0	3	2	2	X	X	10

Sheet 6	1	2	3	4	5	6	7	8	Final
(Pennsylvania) Anderson / Clawson 🔨	1	0	2	2	0	2	0	X	7
(California) Avalon / Franey	0	1	0	0	1	0	1	X	3

Sheet 7	1	2	3	4	5	6	7	8	Final
(Pennsylvania) Dudt / Dudt 🔨	2	0	0	1	1	0	3	2	9
(Michigan) Strouse / Connolly	0	2	1	0	0	4	0	0	7

=== Draw 9 ===
Friday, May 21, 4:00 pm

Sheet 2	1	2	3	4	5	6	7	8	Final
(Massachusetts) Burchesky / Richardson	1	1	0	0	0	2	0	X	4
(Alaska) (Minnesota) Persinger / Plys 🔨	0	0	3	1	1	0	3	X	8

Sheet 3	1	2	3	4	5	6	7	8	Final
(Massachusetts) Rodgers / Casper	3	3	0	1	3	0	0	X	10
(New York (state)) Foote / Hagberg 🔨	0	0	1	0	0	1	1	X	3

Sheet 4	1	2	3	4	5	6	7	8	Final
(Alaska) O'Hara / Thurston 🔨	0	3	0	0	0	1	0	1	5
(Minnesota) McMakin / Fenson	1	0	2	1	1	0	2	0	7

Sheet 5	1	2	3	4	5	6	7	8	Final
(Colorado) Moores / Wheeler 🔨	1	0	1	1	0	2	0	0	5
(Pennsylvania) Rohrbacher / Visnich	0	1	0	0	3	0	1	1	6

Sheet 6	1	2	3	4	5	6	7	8	Final
(Minnesota) Rhyme / Smith 🔨	1	1	1	2	0	4	X	X	9
(Massachusetts) Walker / Leichter	0	0	0	0	1	0	X	X	1

Sheet 7	1	2	3	4	5	6	7	8	Final
(North Dakota) Podoll / Parry 🔨	1	0	0	0	0	1	0	X	2
(Massachusetts) Mullaney / Sinnett	0	1	2	1	1	0	2	X	7

=== Draw 10 ===
Friday, May 21, 7:00 pm

Sheet 2	1	2	3	4	5	6	7	8	Final
(Pennsylvania) Anderson / Clawson	0	0	1	0	0	1	0	X	2
(Minnesota) Bear / Stopera 🔨	3	2	0	1	1	0	1	X	8

Sheet 3	1	2	3	4	5	6	7	8	Final
(Michigan) Strouse / Connolly 🔨	2	1	0	0	3	0	1	0	7
(California) Avalon / Franey	0	0	3	2	0	2	0	2	9

Sheet 4	1	2	3	4	5	6	7	8	Final
(Pennsylvania) Dudt / Dudt 🔨	2	2	0	0	1	1	1	X	7
(Minnesota) Stolt / Stolt	0	0	2	3	0	0	0	X	5

Sheet 5	1	2	3	4	5	6	7	8	Final
(Colorado) Wood / Banyai	1	0	2	0	0	0	1	0	4
(Minnesota) Page / Oldenburg 🔨	0	1	0	2	1	1	0	4	9

Sheet 6	1	2	3	4	5	6	7	8	9	Final
(Minnesota) Geving / Violette	2	0	3	0	2	0	0	0	1	8
(Minnesota) Sinclair / Ruohonen 🔨	0	1	0	1	0	3	1	1	0	7

Sheet 7	1	2	3	4	5	6	7	8	Final
(Wisconsin) Bookhout / Wiza 🔨	0	0	2	2	0	4	0	0	8
(Michigan) Yavarow / Strouse	1	1	0	0	3	0	3	1	9

== Tiebreakers ==
Saturday, May 22, 9:00 am

Sheet 3	1	2	3	4	5	6	7	8	Final
(Massachusetts) Walker / Leichter 🔨	1	0	0	1	1	1	0	2	6
(Massachusetts) Mullaney / Sinnett	0	1	2	0	0	0	1	0	4

Sheet 5	1	2	3	4	5	6	7	8	Final
(Massachusetts) Burchesky / Richardson 🔨	3	0	2	1	0	2	0	X	8
(Minnesota) McMakin / Fenson	0	2	0	0	2	0	1	X	5

Saturday, May 22, 2:00 pm

Sheet 2	1	2	3	4	5	6	7	8	Final
(Colorado) Moores / Wheeler	0	0	2	0	2	0	2	X	6
(Massachusetts) Walker / Leichter 🔨	1	1	0	4	0	3	0	X	9

== Playoffs ==
=== Seeding round ===
The top team in each pool qualified for the seeding round. The winners of both games qualified directly for the semifinals while the losers dropped into the quarterfinals.

To Semifinals
D1	(Minnesota) Geving / Violette	6
A1	(Alaska) (Minnesota) Persinger / Plys	8

To Semifinals
C1	(Minnesota) Bear / Stopera	6
B1	(Minnesota) Rhyme / Smith	4

==== Seeding games ====
Saturday, May 22, 7:00 pm

Sheet 2	1	2	3	4	5	6	7	8	Final
(Minnesota) Geving / Violette	0	4	0	1	0	1	0	0	6
(Alaska) (Minnesota) Persinger / Plys 🔨	2	0	1	0	1	0	2	2	8

Sheet 4	1	2	3	4	5	6	7	8	Final
(Minnesota) Bear / Stopera 🔨	2	0	1	0	0	0	3	X	6
(Minnesota) Rhyme / Smith	0	1	0	1	1	1	0	X	4

=== Championship round ===
Qualification Games
C2	(Pennsylvania) Dudt / Dudt	4
A2	(Massachusetts) Burchesky / Richardson	9
D2	(Minnesota) Sinclair / Ruohonen	5
B2	(Massachusetts) Walker / Leichter	6

Quarterfinals
B1	(Minnesota) Rhyme / Smith	5
A2	(Massachusetts) Burchesky / Richardson	9
D1	(Minnesota) Geving / Violette	7
B2	(Massachusetts) Walker / Leichter	4

Semifinals
C1	(Minnesota) Bear / Stopera	7
A2	(Massachusetts) Burchesky / Richardson	2
A1	(Alaska) (Minnesota) Persinger / Plys	8
D1	(Minnesota) Geving / Violette	5

Final
C1	(Minnesota) Bear / Stopera	5
A1	(Alaska) (Minnesota) Persinger / Plys	8

==== Qualification games ====
Saturday, May 22, 7:00 pm

Sheet 5	1	2	3	4	5	6	7	8	Final
(Minnesota) Sinclair / Ruohonen 🔨	0	0	0	1	0	2	1	1	5
(Massachusetts) Walker / Leichter	1	1	1	0	3	0	0	0	6

Sheet 6	1	2	3	4	5	6	7	8	Final
(Pennsylvania) Dudt / Dudt	0	0	2	1	0	1	0	X	4
(Massachusetts) Burchesky / Richardson 🔨	1	2	0	0	4	0	2	X	9

==== Quarterfinals ====
Sunday, May 23, 9:00 am

Sheet 2	1	2	3	4	5	6	7	8	Final
(Minnesota) Rhyme / Smith	1	0	0	1	2	0	1	X	5
(Massachusetts) Burchesky / Richardson 🔨	0	3	2	0	0	4	0	X	9

Sheet 4	1	2	3	4	5	6	7	8	Final
(Minnesota) Geving / Violette 🔨	1	0	4	1	1	0	0	X	7
(Massachusetts) Walker / Leichter	0	2	0	0	0	1	1	X	4

==== Semifinals ====
Sunday, May 23, 2:00 pm

Sheet 2	1	2	3	4	5	6	7	8	Final
(Alaska) (Minnesota) Persinger / Plys 🔨	0	2	0	2	0	0	2	2	8
(Minnesota) Geving / Violette	2	0	1	0	1	1	0	0	5

Sheet 4	1	2	3	4	5	6	7	8	Final
(Minnesota) Bear / Stopera	0	1	2	1	1	0	2	X	7
(Massachusetts) Burchesky / Richardson 🔨	1	0	0	0	0	1	0	X	2

==== Final ====
Sunday, May 23, 7:00 pm

Sheet 4	1	2	3	4	5	6	7	8	Final
(Minnesota) Bear / Stopera	0	2	0	2	0	0	1	0	5
(Alaska) (Minnesota) Persinger / Plys 🔨	3	0	1	0	1	1	0	2	8
