= 2022 United States Mixed Doubles Curling Championship =

- Host city: Middleton, Wisconsin
- Arena: Bob Suter's Capitol Ice Arena
- Dates: March 8–13
- Winner: (Wisconsin) B. Hamilton / M. Hamilton
- Female: Becca Hamilton
- Male: Matt Hamilton
- Finalist: (Minnesota) Walker / Stopera

The 2022 United States Mixed Doubles Curling Championship was held from March 8 to 13, 2022 at Bob Suter's Capitol Ice Arena in Middleton, Wisconsin. The championship featured twenty-five teams that played in a triple knockout format, which qualified eight teams for the championship round. From there, four teams advanced to the four team page playoff round.

The winning team, Becca and Matt Hamilton, represented the United States at the 2022 World Mixed Doubles Curling Championship in Geneva, Switzerland.

== Teams ==
The teams competing in the 2022 championship were:

Female	Male	Locale
Sarah Anderson	Korey Dropkin	Chaska, Minnesota
Taylor Anderson	Hunter Clawson	Minneapolis, Minnesota
Nicole Bookhout	Benjamin Randall	Madison, Wisconsin
Jenna Burchesky	Ben Richardson	Walpole, Massachusetts
Gloria Chao	Anthony Fowler	Chicago, Illinois
Julia DiBaggio	Michael Mann	Cleveland, Ohio
Aileen Geving	Luc Violette	Duluth, Minnesota
Becca Hamilton	Matt Hamilton	Madison, Wisconsin
Daisy-Scarlett MacCallum	Brian Terwedo	Minneapolis, Minnesota
Andie McDonald	Brian Feldman	Tempe, Arizona
Christine McMakin	Riley Fenson	Bemidji, Minnesota
Clare Moores	Lance Wheeler	Denver, Colorado
Sydney Mullaney	Chase Sinnett	Wayland, Massachusetts
Kaitlin Murphy	Marius Kleinas	Boston, Massachusetts
Anne O'Hara	Coleman Thurston	Fairbanks, Alaska
Ann Podoll	Nathan Parry	Fargo, North Dakota
Kim Rhyme	Jason Smith	Saint Paul, Minnesota
Rebecca Rodgers	Samuel Strouse	Midland, Missouri
Emily Schweitzer	Blake Hagberg	Saint Paul, Minnesota
Jamie Sinclair	Rich Ruohonen	Chaska, Minnesota
Cynthia Smith	Don Johnson	Denver, Colorado
Delaney Strouse	Daniel Casper	Midland, Michigan
Monica Walker	Andrew Stopera	Saint Paul, Minnesota
BriAnna Weldon	Sean Franey	Oakland, California
Becca Wood	Chris Bond	Denver, Colorado

== Knockout brackets ==
=== A event ===
First Knockout	Qualifiers
(Minnesota) Sinclair / Ruohonen	6
(Colorado) Wood / Bond	11	(Colorado) Wood / Bond	3
(California) Weldon / Franey	6	(Minnesota) Sinclair / Ruohonen	6
(Massachusetts) Mullaney / Sinnett	5
(Massachusetts) Mullaney / Sinnett	7
(Colorado) Moores / Wheeler	10	(Colorado) Moores / Wheeler	4	Qualifier 1
(Ohio) DiBaggio / Mann	1	(Minnesota) Sinclair / Ruohonen	8
(Minnesota) Walker / Stopera	9
(Minnesota) Walker / Stopera	8
(Michigan) Strouse / Casper	4	(Wisconsin) Bookhout / Randall	2
(Wisconsin) Bookhout / Randall	7	(Minnesota) Walker / Stopera	6
(Alaska) O'Hara / Thurston	2
(Minnesota) Geving / Violette	4
(Alaska) O'Hara / Thurston	9	(Alaska) O'Hara / Thurston	5
(Arizona) McDonald / Feldman	5
(Wisconsin) B. Hamilton / M. Hamilton	10
(Missouri) Rodgers / Strouse	10	(Missouri) Rodgers / Strouse	5
(Massachusetts) Murphy / Kleinas	2	(Wisconsin) B. Hamilton / M. Hamilton	7
(Minnesota) Anderson / Clawson	4
(Massachusetts) Burchesky / Richardson	6
(Minnesota) Anderson / Clawson	7	(Minnesota) Anderson / Clawson	8	Qualifier 2
(Colorado) Smith / Johnson	4	(Wisconsin) B. Hamilton / M. Hamilton	9
(Minnesota) Rhyme / Smith	7	(Minnesota) Anderson / Dropkin	4
(Minnesota) MacCallum / Terwedo	4	(Minnesota) Rhyme / Smith	8
(Minnesota) McMakin / Fenson	15	(Minnesota) McMakin / Fenson	10
(Illinois) Chao / Fowler	3	(Minnesota) McMakin / Fenson	3
(Minnesota) Anderson / Dropkin	7
(Minnesota) Anderson / Dropkin	7
(North Dakota) Podoll / Parry	9	(North Dakota) Podoll / Parry	4
(Minnesota) Schweitzer / Hagberg	3

=== B event ===
Second Knockout	Qualifiers
(North Dakota) Podoll / Parry	6
(Minnesota) Rhyme / Smith	7
(California) Weldon / Franey	7
(California) Weldon / Franey	1	(Massachusetts) Mullaney / Sinnett	6	Qualifier 3
(Minnesota) Rhyme / Smith	9	(Michigan) Strouse / Casper	9
(Minnesota) Rhyme / Smith	9
(Minnesota) Rhyme / Smith	6	(Minnesota) Anderson / Dropkin	6
(Ohio) DiBaggio / Mann	3
(Michigan) Strouse / Casper	11
(Missouri) Rodgers / Strouse	3
(Alaska) O'Hara / Thurston	7
(Michigan) Strouse / Casper	11
(Michigan) Strouse / Casper	8	(Michigan) Strouse / Casper	8
(Massachusetts) Burchesky / Richardson	6
(Massachusetts) Burchesky / Richardson	8
(Arizona) McDonald / Feldman	6
(Minnesota) Geving / Violette	7
(Minnesota) Geving / Violette	7
(Massachusetts) Murphy / Kleinas	2
(Minnesota) Geving / Violette	10	(Minnesota) Anderson / Clawson	8	Qualifier 4
(Colorado) Smith / Johnson	4	(Colorado) Moores / Wheeler	4
(Wisconsin) Bookhout / Randall	8
(Minnesota) Anderson / Clawson	4	(Minnesota) Sinclair / Ruohonen	8
(Colorado) Smith / Johnson	12
(Colorado) Moores / Wheeler	8
(Illinois) Chao / Fowler	3
(Colorado) Moores / Wheeler	8
(Minnesota) MacCallum / Terwedo	6	(Colorado) Moores / Wheeler	10
(Colorado) Moores / Wheeler	10	(Minnesota) McMakin / Fenson	7
(Illinois) Chao / Fowler	10
(Colorado) Wood / Bond	6
(Colorado) Wood / Bond	9
(Minnesota) Schweitzer / Hagberg	6

=== C event ===
Third Knockout	Qualifiers
Qualifier 5
(California) Weldon / Franey	5
(California) Weldon / Franey	6	(Minnesota) Rhyme / Smith	9
(Minnesota) Schweitzer / Hagberg	4	(Minnesota) McMakin / Fenson	3
(Illinois) Chao / Fowler	4	(California) Weldon / Franey	11	Qualifier 6
(Minnesota) Schweitzer / Hagberg	9	(Minnesota) Geving / Violette	7
(Massachusetts) Burchesky / Richardson	6	(Minnesota) Anderson / Dropkin	11
(Massachusetts) Murphy / Kleinas	5	(Minnesota) Geving / Violette	8
(Massachusetts) Murphy / Kleinas	6	(Massachusetts) Burchesky / Richardson	10	Qualifier 7
(Wisconsin) Bookhout / Randall	4	(Alaska) O'Hara / Thurston	8
(Missouri) Rodgers / Strouse	1	(Colorado) Moores / Wheeler	9
(Missouri) Rodgers / Strouse	8	(Alaska) O'Hara / Thurston	8
(Missouri) Rodgers / Strouse	6	(Colorado) Smith / Johnson	7	Qualifier 8
(Arizona) McDonald / Feldman	4	(Massachusetts) Mullaney / Sinnett	2
(Colorado) Wood / Bond	3	(Minnesota) Anderson / Clawson	11
(North Dakota) Podoll / Parry	6	(Massachusetts) Mullaney / Sinnett	11
(Ohio) DiBaggio / Mann	8	(Colorado) Wood / Bond	7
(Ohio) DiBaggio / Mann	9	(North Dakota) Podoll / Parry	10
(Minnesota) MacCallum / Terwedo	5

== Knockout results ==
All draw times listed in Central Time (UTC-06:00).

=== Draw 1 ===
Tuesday, March 8, 9:00 am

Sheet B	1	2	3	4	5	6	7	8	Final
(Colorado) Moores / Wheeler 🔨	1	1	4	1	1	0	2	X	10
(Ohio) DiBaggio / Mann	0	0	0	0	0	1	0	X	1

Sheet C	1	2	3	4	5	6	7	8	Final
(Michigan) Strouse / Casper	2	1	0	0	1	0	0	X	4
(Wisconsin) Bookhout / Randall 🔨	0	0	3	1	0	1	2	X	7

Sheet D	1	2	3	4	5	6	7	8	Final
(Minnesota) Rhyme / Smith	1	1	1	0	3	1	0	X	7
(Minnesota) MacCallum / Terwedo 🔨	0	0	0	1	0	0	3	X	4

Sheet E	1	2	3	4	5	6	7	8	Final
(Minnesota) McMakin / Fenson	6	0	5	1	1	2	X	X	15
(Illinois) Chao / Fowler 🔨	0	3	0	0	0	0	X	X	3

=== Draw 2 ===
Tuesday, March 8, 12:30 pm

Sheet A	1	2	3	4	5	6	7	8	Final
(Colorado) Wood / Bond	0	4	0	0	2	2	3	X	11
(California) Weldon / Franey 🔨	3	0	2	1	0	0	0	X	6

Sheet B	1	2	3	4	5	6	7	8	Final
(Alaska) O'Hara / Thurston	2	0	0	5	1	0	1	X	9
(Arizona) McDonald / Feldman 🔨	0	2	2	0	0	1	0	X	5

Sheet C	1	2	3	4	5	6	7	8	Final
(Missouri) Rodgers / Strouse	2	1	0	2	3	1	1	X	10
(Massachusetts) Murphy / Kleinas 🔨	0	0	2	0	0	0	0	X	2

Sheet D	1	2	3	4	5	6	7	8	Final
(Minnesota) Anderson / Clawson 🔨	2	1	1	0	0	1	2	0	7
(Colorado) Smith / Johnson	0	0	0	1	2	0	0	1	4

Sheet E	1	2	3	4	5	6	7	8	Final
(North Dakota) Podoll / Parry	2	2	1	0	1	1	2	X	9
(Minnesota) Schweitzer / Hagberg 🔨	0	0	0	3	0	0	0	X	3

=== Draw 3 ===
Tuesday, March 8, 4:00 pm

Sheet A	1	2	3	4	5	6	7	8	Final
(Minnesota) Rhyme / Smith	0	4	0	0	0	3	1	0	8
(Minnesota) McMakin / Fenson 🔨	2	0	1	2	1	0	0	4	10

Sheet B	1	2	3	4	5	6	7	8	Final
(Minnesota) MacCallum / Terwedo 🔨	5	0	0	0	1	0	X	X	6
(Illinois) Chao / Fowler	0	1	1	3	0	5	X	X	10

Sheet D	1	2	3	4	5	6	7	8	Final
(Massachusetts) Mullaney / Sinnett 🔨	2	4	0	1	0	0	0	X	7
(Colorado) Moores / Wheeler	0	0	1	0	1	1	1	X	4

Sheet E	1	2	3	4	5	6	7	8	Final
(Minnesota) Walker / Stopera	1	0	1	0	2	2	2	X	8
(Wisconsin) Bookhout / Randall 🔨	0	1	0	1	0	0	0	X	2

=== Draw 4 ===
Tuesday, March 8, 7:30 pm

Sheet A	1	2	3	4	5	6	7	8	Final
(Wisconsin) B. Hamilton / M. Hamilton 🔨	3	3	0	0	1	0	3	X	10
(Missouri) Rodgers / Strouse	0	0	2	2	0	1	0	X	5

Sheet B	1	2	3	4	5	6	7	8	Final
(Minnesota) Anderson / Dropkin 🔨	2	0	2	0	2	0	1	X	7
(North Dakota) Podoll / Parry	0	1	0	2	0	1	0	X	4

Sheet C	1	2	3	4	5	6	7	8	Final
(Massachusetts) Burchesky / Richardson	0	1	0	3	0	1	1	X	6
(Minnesota) Anderson / Clawson 🔨	1	0	3	0	4	0	0	X	8

Sheet D	1	2	3	4	5	6	7	8	Final
(Minnesota) Sinclair / Ruohonen 🔨	1	0	1	1	1	0	2	X	6
(Colorado) Wood / Bond	0	1	0	0	0	2	0	X	3

Sheet E	1	2	3	4	5	6	7	8	Final
(Minnesota) Geving / Violette 🔨	1	1	1	0	0	0	1	X	4
(Alaska) O'Hara / Thurston	0	0	0	1	3	1	0	X	5

=== Draw 5 ===
Wednesday, March 9, 9:00 am

Sheet B	1	2	3	4	5	6	7	8	9	Final
(Wisconsin) Bookhout / Randall	0	0	0	1	0	1	3	3	0	8
(Colorado) Smith / Johnson 🔨	3	1	1	0	3	0	0	0	4	12

Sheet C	1	2	3	4	5	6	7	8	Final
(Illinois) Chao / Fowler	0	0	0	0	2	1	0	X	3
(Colorado) Moores / Wheeler 🔨	2	1	2	1	0	0	4	X	10

Sheet D	1	2	3	4	5	6	7	8	Final
(Minnesota) Rhyme / Smith 🔨	3	3	1	2	0	0	0	X	9
(Ohio) DiBaggio / Mann	0	0	0	0	1	1	1	X	3

=== Draw 6 ===
Wednesday, March 9, 12:30 pm

Sheet A	1	2	3	4	5	6	7	8	Final
(Minnesota) Geving / Violette	0	1	1	1	1	0	3	X	7
(Massachusetts) Murphy / Kleinas 🔨	1	0	0	0	0	1	0	X	2

Sheet B	1	2	3	4	5	6	7	8	Final
(Missouri) Rodgers / Strouse 🔨	1	0	1	0	1	0	X	X	3
(Michigan) Strouse / Casper	0	2	0	4	0	5	X	X	11

Sheet C	1	2	3	4	5	6	7	8	9	Final
(Colorado) Wood / Bond 🔨	3	0	0	1	0	0	2	0	3	9
(Minnesota) Schweitzer / Hagberg	0	1	1	0	1	1	0	2	0	6

Sheet D	1	2	3	4	5	6	7	8	Final
(North Dakota) Podoll / Parry 🔨	1	1	0	0	1	0	3	0	6
(California) Weldon / Franey	0	0	3	1	0	1	0	2	7

Sheet E	1	2	3	4	5	6	7	8	Final
(Massachusetts) Burchesky / Richardson 🔨	0	2	1	0	2	0	3	0	8
(Arizona) McDonald / Feldman	1	0	0	1	0	3	0	1	6

=== Draw 7 ===
Wednesday, March 9, 4:00 pm

Sheet B	1	2	3	4	5	6	7	8	Final
(Minnesota) Sinclair / Ruohonen 🔨	1	1	0	2	0	1	0	1	6
(Massachusetts) Mullaney / Sinnett	0	0	1	0	1	0	3	0	5

Sheet C	1	2	3	4	5	6	7	8	Final
(Minnesota) McMakin / Fenson 🔨	0	0	1	0	1	0	1	X	3
(Minnesota) Anderson / Dropkin	1	2	0	2	0	2	0	X	7

Sheet D	1	2	3	4	5	6	7	8	Final
(Minnesota) Walker / Stopera 🔨	1	0	1	1	0	2	1	X	6
(Alaska) O'Hara / Thurston	0	1	0	0	1	0	0	X	2

Sheet E	1	2	3	4	5	6	7	8	Final
(Ohio) DiBaggio / Mann 🔨	0	2	0	2	0	0	4	1	9
(Minnesota) MacCallum / Terwedo	1	0	1	0	1	2	0	0	5

=== Draw 8 ===
Wednesday, March 9, 7:30 pm

Sheet A	1	2	3	4	5	6	7	8	Final
(Michigan) Strouse / Casper 🔨	1	0	1	0	0	2	4	0	8
(Massachusetts) Burchesky / Richardson	0	1	0	2	1	0	0	2	6

Sheet B	1	2	3	4	5	6	7	8	Final
(Wisconsin) B. Hamilton / M. Hamilton	2	1	0	0	2	0	2	X	7
(Minnesota) Anderson / Clawson 🔨	0	0	1	1	0	2	0	X	4

Sheet C	1	2	3	4	5	6	7	8	Final
(Minnesota) Geving / Violette	0	2	0	4	0	2	2	X	10
(Colorado) Smith / Johnson 🔨	1	0	1	0	2	0	0	X	4

Sheet D	1	2	3	4	5	6	7	8	Final
(Colorado) Moores / Wheeler 🔨	2	0	4	3	0	1	0	X	10
(Colorado) Wood / Bond	0	2	0	0	3	0	1	X	6

Sheet E	1	2	3	4	5	6	7	8	Final
(California) Weldon / Franey	0	0	0	0	0	1	X	X	1
(Minnesota) Rhyme / Smith 🔨	3	2	2	1	1	0	X	X	9

=== Draw 9 ===
Thursday, March 10, 10:00 am

Sheet B	1	2	3	4	5	6	7	8	Final
(Ohio) DiBaggio / Mann 🔨	2	0	3	0	0	3	0	0	8
(North Dakota) Podoll / Parry	0	4	0	1	1	0	3	1	10

Sheet C	1	2	3	4	5	6	7	8	Final
(Missouri) Rodgers / Strouse 🔨	0	0	2	2	0	2	0	X	6
(Arizona) McDonald / Feldman	1	1	0	0	1	0	1	X	4

Sheet D	1	2	3	4	5	6	7	8	Final
(Illinois) Chao / Fowler	0	1	0	0	0	3	0	X	4
(Minnesota) Schweitzer / Hagberg 🔨	2	0	3	2	1	0	1	X	9

Sheet E	1	2	3	4	5	6	7	8	Final
(Massachusetts) Murphy / Kleinas	1	1	1	0	2	1	0	X	6
(Wisconsin) Bookhout / Randall 🔨	0	0	0	3	0	0	1	X	4

=== Draw 10 ===
Thursday, March 10, 1:00 pm

Sheet A	1	2	3	4	5	6	7	8	9	Final
(Minnesota) Rhyme / Smith 🔨	2	1	0	1	2	0	0	0	1	7
(Massachusetts) Mullaney / Sinnett	0	0	2	0	0	2	1	1	0	6

Sheet B	1	2	3	4	5	6	7	8	Final
(Alaska) O'Hara / Thurston 🔨	1	0	0	2	1	1	2	0	7
(Michigan) Strouse / Casper	0	4	3	0	0	0	0	1	8

Sheet C	1	2	3	4	5	6	7	8	Final
(Minnesota) Schweitzer / Hagberg	0	1	0	3	0	0	X	X	4
(California) Weldon / Franey 🔨	1	0	3	0	4	3	X	X	11

Sheet D	1	2	3	4	5	6	7	8	9	Final
(Minnesota) Geving / Violette 🔨	1	1	2	0	3	0	0	0	0	7
(Minnesota) Anderson / Clawson	0	0	0	1	0	3	1	2	1	8

Sheet E	1	2	3	4	5	6	7	8	Final
(Colorado) Moores / Wheeler 🔨	0	1	1	0	0	2	0	4	8
(Minnesota) McMakin / Fenson	1	0	0	2	2	0	2	0	7

=== Draw 11 ===
Thursday, March 10, 4:00 pm

Sheet A	1	2	3	4	5	6	7	8	Final
(North Dakota) Podoll / Parry 🔨	1	0	1	0	1	0	3	0	6
(Colorado) Wood / Bond	0	1	0	1	0	2	0	3	7

Sheet B	1	2	3	4	5	6	7	8	Final
(Massachusetts) Murphy / Kleinas	0	2	0	2	1	0	0	0	5
(Massachusetts) Burchesky / Richardson 🔨	2	0	3	0	0	2	1	2	10

Sheet C	1	2	3	4	5	6	7	8	Final
(Minnesota) Sinclair / Ruohonen	0	4	0	1	0	0	2	1	8
(Minnesota) Walker / Stopera 🔨	2	0	3	0	3	1	0	0	9

Sheet D	1	2	3	4	5	6	7	8	Final
(Wisconsin) B. Hamilton / M. Hamilton	0	2	1	2	0	2	2	X	9
(Minnesota) Anderson / Dropkin 🔨	2	0	0	0	2	0	0	X	4

Sheet E	1	2	3	4	5	6	7	8	9	Final
(Missouri) Rodgers / Strouse	1	0	2	0	2	0	2	0	1	8
(Colorado) Smith / Johnson 🔨	0	1	0	1	0	2	0	3	0	7

=== Draw 12 ===
Thursday, March 10, 7:30 pm

Sheet A	1	2	3	4	5	6	7	8	Final
(California) Weldon / Franey 🔨	2	0	1	1	1	1	0	X	6
(Minnesota) McMakin / Fenson	0	1	0	0	0	0	2	X	3

Sheet B	1	2	3	4	5	6	7	8	Final
(Colorado) Wood / Bond 🔨	1	0	0	0	2	0	X	X	3
(Massachusetts) Mullaney / Sinnett	0	2	2	4	0	3	X	X	11

Sheet C	1	2	3	4	5	6	7	8	Final
(Minnesota) Anderson / Clawson 🔨	1	0	1	0	1	0	1	X	4
(Colorado) Moores / Wheeler	0	3	0	4	0	1	0	X	8

Sheet D	1	2	3	4	5	6	7	8	Final
(Minnesota) Rhyme / Smith	0	0	1	0	5	0	0	X	6
(Michigan) Strouse / Casper 🔨	2	1	0	2	0	3	3	X	11

=== Draw 13 ===
Friday, March 11, 11:00 am

Sheet A	1	2	3	4	5	6	7	8	Final
(Massachusetts) Burchesky / Richardson	0	0	2	1	0	0	3	0	6
(Minnesota) Geving / Violette 🔨	1	1	0	0	2	1	0	3	8

Sheet B	1	2	3	4	5	6	7	8	Final
(Colorado) Moores / Wheeler	0	1	0	1	0	0	2	X	4
(Minnesota) Sinclair / Ruohonen 🔨	3	0	2	0	1	2	0	X	8

Sheet C	1	2	3	4	5	6	7	8	Final
(Michigan) Strouse / Casper	0	2	0	4	0	2	1	0	9
(Minnesota) Anderson / Dropkin 🔨	2	0	2	0	1	0	0	1	6

Sheet D	1	2	3	4	5	6	7	8	Final
(Missouri) Rodgers / Strouse 🔨	0	0	1	0	0	0	X	X	1
(Alaska) O'Hara / Thurston	1	2	0	2	2	1	X	X	8

=== Draw 14 ===
Friday, March 11, 3:00 pm

Sheet B	1	2	3	4	5	6	7	8	Final
(Minnesota) Geving / Violette 🔨	0	2	0	5	0	0	0	0	7
(Minnesota) Anderson / Dropkin	2	0	1	0	2	2	1	3	11

Sheet C	1	2	3	4	5	6	7	8	Final
(Alaska) O'Hara / Thurston 🔨	0	0	4	0	4	0	0	0	8
(Colorado) Moores / Wheeler	2	1	0	2	0	1	2	1	9

Sheet D	1	2	3	4	5	6	7	8	Final
(Massachusetts) Mullaney / Sinnett 🔨	0	0	0	0	2	0	X	X	2
(Minnesota) Anderson / Clawson	4	1	2	2	0	2	X	X	11

Sheet E	1	2	3	4	5	6	7	8	Final
(California) Weldon / Franey	0	0	4	0	0	0	1	X	5
(Minnesota) Rhyme / Smith 🔨	3	3	0	1	1	1	0	X	9

== Championship round ==
To 1 vs. 2 Page Playoff
A1	(Minnesota) Walker / Stopera	8
B1	(Michigan) Strouse / Casper	6
A2	(Wisconsin) B. Hamilton / M. Hamilton	9
B2	(Minnesota) Sinclair / Ruohonen	1

To 3 vs. 4 Page Playoff
B1	(Minnesota) Strouse / Casper	5
C1	(Minnesota) Rhyme / Smith	1	C3	(Minnesota) Moores / Wheeler	4
C3	(Colorado) Moores / Wheeler	6
B2	(Minnesota) Sinclair / Ruohonen	7
C2	(Minnesota) Anderson / Dropkin	9	C2	(Minnesota) Anderson / Dropkin	6
C4	(Minnesota) Anderson / Clawson	4

=== Draw 15 ===
Friday, March 11, 7:00 pm

Sheet B	1	2	3	4	5	6	7	8	Final
(Minnesota) Walker / Stopera 🔨	2	0	0	1	0	4	0	1	8
(Michigan) Strouse / Casper	0	1	2	0	1	0	2	0	6

Sheet C	1	2	3	4	5	6	7	8	Final
(Minnesota) Anderson / Dropkin 🔨	3	1	0	1	2	0	2	X	9
(Minnesota) Anderson / Clawson	0	0	2	0	0	2	0	X	4

Sheet D	1	2	3	4	5	6	7	8	Final
(Minnesota) Rhyme / Smith	0	0	0	0	1	0	0	X	1
(Colorado) Moores / Wheeler 🔨	1	1	1	1	0	1	1	X	6

Sheet E	1	2	3	4	5	6	7	8	Final
(Wisconsin) B. Hamilton / M. Hamilton 🔨	0	3	1	4	1	X	X	X	9
(Minnesota) Sinclair / Ruohonen	1	0	0	0	0	X	X	X	1

=== Draw 16 ===
Saturday, March 12, 11:00 am

Sheet C	1	2	3	4	5	6	7	8	Final
(Michigan) Strouse / Casper 🔨	0	1	0	0	2	1	0	1	5
(Colorado) Moores / Wheeler	1	0	1	1	0	0	1	0	4

Sheet D	1	2	3	4	5	6	7	8	Final
(Minnesota) Sinclair / Ruohonen 🔨	2	1	0	1	2	0	0	1	7
(Minnesota) Anderson / Dropkin	0	0	4	0	0	1	1	0	6

== Playoffs ==
Page playoff system
1	(Minnesota) Walker / Stopera	6
2	(Wisconsin) B. Hamilton / M. Hamilton	8
3	(Michigan) Strouse / Casper	7
4	(Minnesota) Sinclair / Ruohonen	9

Semifinal
1	(Minnesota) Walker / Stopera	9
4	(Minnesota) Sinclair / Ruohonen	8

Final
2	(Wisconsin) B. Hamilton / M. Hamilton	9
1	(Minnesota) Walker / Stopera	3

=== 1 vs. 2 ===
Saturday, March 12, 3:00 pm

Sheet C	1	2	3	4	5	6	7	8	Final
(Minnesota) Walker / Stopera	1	0	1	0	0	2	0	2	6
(Wisconsin) B. Hamilton / M. Hamilton 🔨	0	1	0	3	2	0	2	0	8

=== 3 vs. 4 ===
Saturday, March 12, 3:00 pm

Sheet B	1	2	3	4	5	6	7	8	Final
(Michigan) Strouse / Casper	0	2	1	0	2	0	0	2	7
(Minnesota) Sinclair / Ruohonen 🔨	2	0	0	4	0	1	2	0	9

=== Semifinal ===
Saturday, March 12, 7:00 pm

Sheet C	1	2	3	4	5	6	7	8	9	Final
(Minnesota) Walker / Stopera 🔨	0	2	4	0	0	2	0	0	1	9
(Minnesota) Sinclair / Ruohonen	2	0	0	1	1	0	3	1	0	8

=== Final ===
Sunday, March 13, 11:00 am

Sheet C	1	2	3	4	5	6	7	8	Final
(Wisconsin) B. Hamilton / M. Hamilton 🔨	0	3	2	0	2	1	1	X	9
(Minnesota) Walker / Stopera	1	0	0	2	0	0	0	X	3
