= Chris Plys =

American curler (born 1987)

- Curler
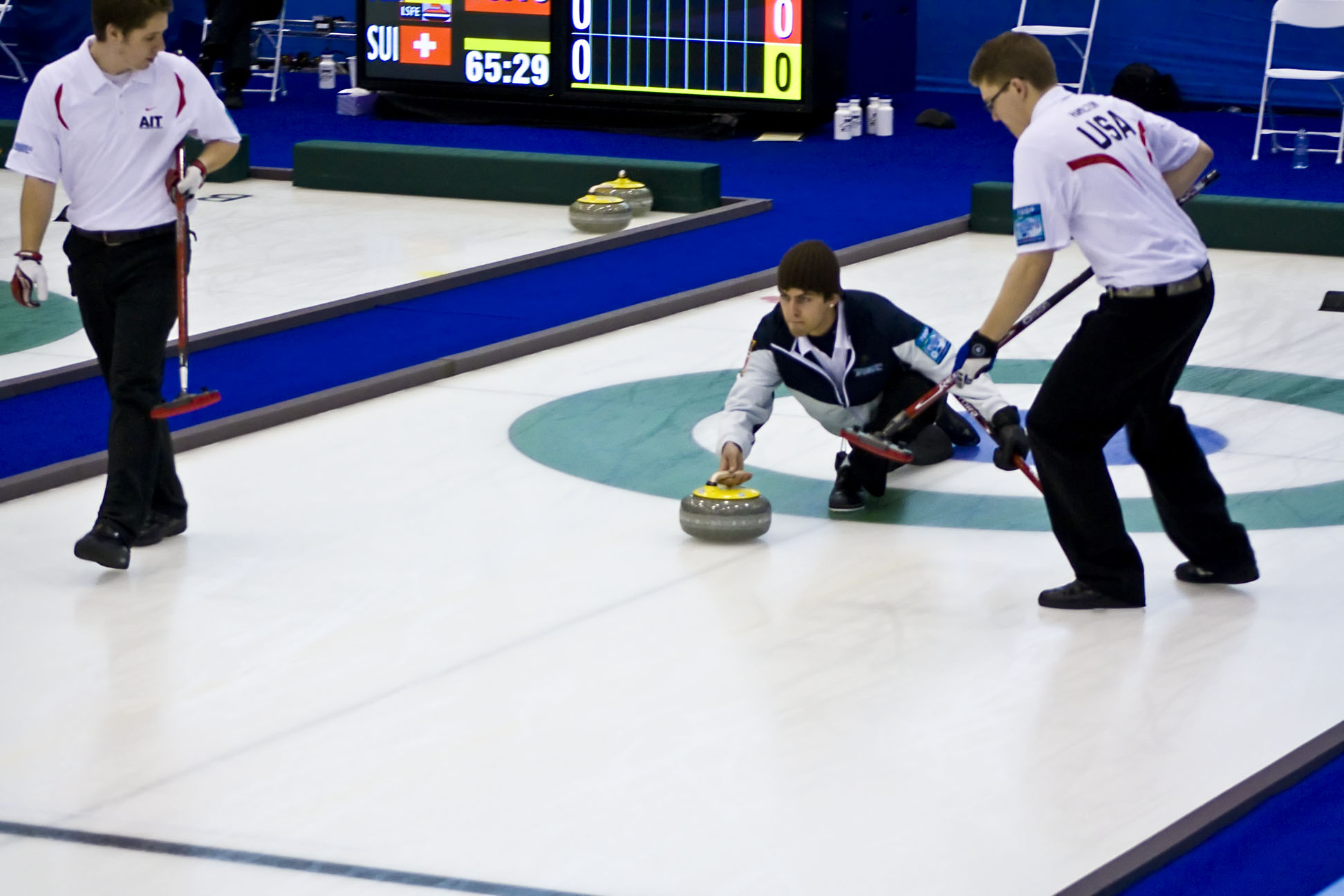
- Plys delivering a stone at the 2009 World Junior Curling Championships
- Born: Christopher Plys; August 13, 1987 (age 39); Duluth, Minnesota, U.S.
- Height: 6 ft 1 in (1.85 m)

Team
- Curling club: Duluth CC, Duluth, MN

Curling career
- Member Association: United States
- World Championship: 8 (2009, 2018, 2019, 2021, 2023, 2024, 2025, 2026)
- Pan Continental Championship: 2 (2024, 2025)
- Olympic: 2 (2010, 2022)
Medal record
Curling
Representing United States
Pan Continental Championships
Silver medal – second place	2025 Virginia
Bronze medal – third place	2024 Lacombe
World Junior Championships
Gold medal – first place	2008 Östersund
Bronze medal – third place	2009 Vancouver
World University Championships
Gold medal – first place	2007 Pinerolo
US Men's Championship
Gold medal – first place	2019 Kalamazoo
Gold medal – first place	2020 Cheney
Gold medal – first place	2023 Denver
Gold medal – first place	2024 East Rutherford
Gold medal – first place	2026 Charlotte
Silver medal – second place	2011 Fargo
Silver medal – second place	2013 Green Bay
Silver medal – second place	2018 Fargo
Bronze medal – third place	2014 Philadelphia
Bronze medal – third place	2015 Kalamazoo
Bronze medal – third place	2025 Duluth
US Olympic Trials
Gold medal – first place	2021 Omaha
Silver medal – second place	2017 Omaha
Silver medal – second place	2025 Sioux Falls
US Mixed Doubles Championship
Gold medal – first place	2021 Wausau
Silver medal – second place	2019 Seattle
Bronze medal – third place	2023 Kalamazoo
US Mixed Doubles Olympic Trials
Gold medal – first place	2021 Eveleth

Christopher Plys (/ˈplaɪz/; born August 13, 1987) is an American curler from Duluth, Minnesota. He is a World Junior Champion and five-time National Men's Champion. He was the alternate for the United States men's team at the 2010 Winter Olympics and a member of both the men's team and the mixed doubles team at the 2022 Winter Olympics.

== Career ==
Plys started curling in 1998 at the age of eleven. He competed at seven Junior National Championships in a row, winning five of them, including four in a row as skip to finish his junior career. This gives him more junior national titles as skip than any other junior male. As US Champion, he competed at four World Junior Championships. In his first, 2006, Plys took ninth place in Jeonju, South Korea. The next year, in 2007, he took fifth place in Eveleth, Minnesota. And finally in 2008, Plys won the gold medal in Ostersund, Sweden. At his final Junior Worlds in 2009 he again medaled, taking the bronze. Plys also competed at the World University Games in 2007, in Pinerolo, Italy, playing second on John Shuster's gold medal team.

Early in his men's career, Plys was twice invited to be alternate on Shuster's team at international events, at the World Championship in 2009 and the 2010 Winter Olympics. At the Olympics, he was called in to skip the team (in place of Shuster) during draw 6 after the US team suffered four losses in a row, and led the team to a 4–3 victory over France after a 10th end steal. Following the Olympics, Plys was drafted onto Tyler George's team, where he threw third rocks (and sometimes fourth). The George team finished as runners-up in the 2011 and 2013 national championships. In 2014, Plys moved to third on Heath McCormick's team, which placed third in the 2014 and 2015 national championships, and second in both the 2017 Olympic Trials (to Shuster) and 2018 national championships.

After winning gold at the 2018 Olympics, Tyler George, who had moved to Shuster's team, took a hiatus from curling, and Plys replaced him at third. Team Shuster then won the 2019 national championships and represented the US at the 2019 World Men's Curling Championship, where they finished in fifth place. They defended their United States title at the 2020 United States Men's Championship, defeating Rich Ruohonen in the final to finish the tournament undefeated. The national title would have earned Team Shuster a spot at the final Grand Slam of the season, the Champions Cup, as well as the chance to represent the United States at the 2020 World Men's Curling Championship, but both events were cancelled due to the COVID-19 pandemic.

Team Shuster represented the United States at the 2021 World Men's Curling Championship, which was played in a fan-less bubble in Calgary due to the ongoing COVID-19 pandemic. There, the team led the U.S. to a 10–3 round robin record, in third place. They played Switzerland in the playoffs, in a game which was delayed a day due to some curlers initially testing positive (including Plys himself) for the virus, but later testing negative (it was later revealed that they were all false positives). In the game, Switzerland, skipped by Peter de Cruz, beat the Americans to advance to the semifinals.

== Personal life ==
Plys is the owner of Plys Superior Consulting. As of 2025, he is engaged.

== Teams ==
=== Men's ===
Season	Skip	Third	Second	Lead	Alternate	Coach	Events
2002–03	Jesse Gates	Jeff Thune	Kevin Johnson	Shane McKinlay	Chris Plys	Larry Barott	2003 USJCC (gold)
2003–04	Chris Plys	Aanders Brorson	Kyle Coldagelli	Carl Ball	Matt Zbylut	Seppo Sormunen	2004 USJCC (5th)
2004–05	Aanders Brorson	Chris Plys	Mark Moore	Grant Rahn	Ryan Brown	Kent Brorson	2005 USJCC (5th)
2005–06	Chris Plys	Matt Mielke	Kevin Johnson	Tommy Kent	Aaron Wald		2006 USJCC (gold); 2006 WJCC (9th)
2006–07	Chris Plys	Aanders Brorson	Matt Perushek	Joel Cooper			2007 USJCC (gold); 2007 WJCC (5th)
2007–08	Chris Plys	Aanders Brorson	Matt Perushek	Matt Hamilton			2008 USJCC (gold); 2008 WJCC (gold)
2007–08	John Shuster	Jeff Isaacson	Chris Plys	Shane McKinlay	Jason Smith		2008 USMCC (6th)
2008–09	Chris Plys	Aanders Brorson	Matt Perushek	Matt Hamilton			2009 USJCC (gold); 2009 USOCT (8th); 2009 WJCC (bronze)
2008–09	John Shuster	Jason Smith	Jeff Isaacson	John Benton	Chris Plys	Brian Simonson	2009 WMCC (5th)
2009–10	John Shuster	Jason Smith	Jeff Isaacson	John Benton	Chris Plys		2010 OG (10th)
2010–11	Tyler George	Chris Plys	Rich Ruohonen	Phill Drobnick			2011 USMCC (silver)
2011–12	Tyler George	Chris Plys	Rich Ruohonen	Colin Hufman			2012 USMCC (8th)
2012–13	Chris Plys (Fourth)	Tyler George (Skip)	Rich Ruohonen	Colin Hufman			2013 USMCC (silver)
2013–14	Chris Plys (Fourth)	Tyler George (Skip)	Rich Ruohonen	Colin Hufman	Craig Brown		2013 USOCT (4th)
2013–14	Heath McCormick	Chris Plys	Rich Ruohonen	Colin Hufman			2014 USMCC (bronze)
2014–15	Heath McCormick	Chris Plys	Joe Polo	Colin Hufman	Ryan Brunt		2015 USMCC (bronze)
2015–16	Chris Plys (Fourth)	Pete Fenson (Skip)	Joe Polo	Jason Smith			2016 USMCC (7th)
2016–17	Heath McCormick	Chris Plys	Korey Dropkin	Tom Howell			2017 USMCC (6th)
2017–18	Heath McCormick	Chris Plys	Korey Dropkin	Tom Howell	Rich Ruohonen (USOCT)		2017 USOCT (silver); 2018 USMCC (silver)
2017–18	Greg Persinger (Fourth)	Rich Ruohonen (Skip)	Colin Hufman	Philip Tilker	Chris Plys	Phill Drobnick	2018 WMCC (6th)
2018–19	John Shuster	Chris Plys	Matt Hamilton	John Landsteiner			2019 USMCC (gold); 2019 WMCC (5th)
2019–20	John Shuster	Chris Plys	Matt Hamilton	John Landsteiner		Sean Beighton	2020 USMCC (gold)
2020–21	John Shuster	Chris Plys	Matt Hamilton	John Landsteiner	Colin Hufman	Sean Beighton	2021 WMCC (5th)
2021–22	John Shuster	Chris Plys	Matt Hamilton	John Landsteiner	Colin Hufman		2021 USOCT (gold); 2022 OG (4th)
2022–23	John Shuster	Chris Plys	Matt Hamilton	John Landsteiner	Colin Hufman	Phil Drobnick	2023 USMCC (gold); 2023 WMCC (8th)
2023–24	John Shuster	Chris Plys	Colin Hufman	Matt Hamilton	John Landsteiner	Theran Michaelis	2024 USMCC (gold); 2024 WMCC (6th)
2024–25	John Shuster	Chris Plys	Colin Hufman	Matt Hamilton	John Landsteiner	Theran Michaelis	2024 PCCC (bronze); 2025 USMCC (bronze)
2024–25	Korey Dropkin	Thomas Howell	Andrew Stopera	Mark Fenner	Chris Plys	Mark Lazar	2025 WMCC (11th)
2025–26	John Shuster	Chris Plys	Colin Hufman	Matt Hamilton	Daniel Casper (PCCC); Aidan Oldenburg (WMCC)	Theran Michaelis	2025 PCCC (silver); 2026 USMCC (gold); 2026 WMCC (4th)

=== Mixed doubles ===
Season	Female	Male	Events
2016–17	Aileen Geving	Chris Plys	2017 USMDCC (12th)
2017–18	Aileen Geving	Chris Plys	
2018–19	Vicky Persinger	Chris Plys	2019 USMDCC (silver)
2019–20	Vicky Persinger	Chris Plys	2020 USMDCC (5th)
2020–21	Vicky Persinger	Chris Plys	2021 USMDCC (gold)
2021–22	Vicky Persinger	Chris Plys	2021 USMDOT (gold); 2022 OG (8th)
2022–23	Vicky Persinger	Chris Plys	2023 USMDCC (bronze)
