= 2013 St. Paul Cash Spiel =

World Curling Tour event

- Host city: St. Paul, Minnesota
- Arena: St. Paul Curling Club
- Dates: October 4–6
- Men's winner: (Manitoba) Scott Ramsay
- Skip: Scott Ramsay
- Third: Mark Taylor
- Second: Ross McFadyen
- Lead: Kyle Werenich
- Finalist: (Minnesota) Tyler George
- Women's winner: (Manitoba) Michelle Montford
- Skip: Michelle Montford
- Third: Lisa DeRiviere
- Second: Sara Van Walleghem
- Lead: Sarah Neufeld
- Finalist: (Minnesota) Alexandra Carlson

The 2013 St. Paul Cash Spiel was held from October 4 to 6 at the St. Paul Curling Club in St. Paul, Minnesota at the 2013–14 World Curling Tour. Both the men's and women's events were held in a round robin format. The purse for the men's event was CAD$16,000, while the purse for the women's event was CAD$7,200.

== Men ==
=== Teams ===
The teams are listed as follows:

Skip	Third	Second	Lead	Locale
Brennan Wark (fourth)	Brian Adams, Jr. (skip)	Jordan Potts	Joel Adams	Thunder Bay, Ontario
Todd Birr	Doug Pottinger	Tom O'Connor	Troy Schroeder	Blaine, Minnesota
Trevor Bonot	Allen Macsemchuk	Chris Briand	Tim Jewett	Thunder Bay, Ontario
Craig Brown	Kroy Nernberger	Matt Hamilton	Jon Brunt	Madison, Wisconsin
Bryan Burgess	Mike Pozihun	Dale Wiersema	Pat Berezowski	Thunder Bay, Ontario
Matthew Carlson	Tim Gartner	Jim Ivey	Mark Hartman	St. Paul, Minnesota
Derrick Casper	Stephen Dropkin	Marcus Fonger	Robert Splinter	Madison, Wisconsin
Jeff Currie	Mike McCarville	Colin Koivula	Jamie Childs	Thunder Bay, Ontario
Korey Dropkin	Thomas Howell	Mark Fenner	Alex Fenson	Southborough, Massachusetts
Scott Dunnam	Andrew Stopera	Steven Szemple	Andrew Dunnam	Philadelphia, Pennsylvania
Mike Farbelow	Kevin Deeren	Kraig Deeren	Mark Lazar	St. Paul, Minnesota
Eric Fenson	Josh Bahr	Jon Chandler	Mark Haluptzok	Bemidji, Minnesota
Christopher Plys (fourth)	Tyler George (skip)	Rich Ruohonen	Colin Hufman	Duluth, Minnesota
Dale Gibbs	James Honsvall	Eric Schultz	Perry Tholl	St. Paul, Minnesota
Geoff Goodland	Pete Westberg	Tim Solin	Cal Tillisch	Woodbury, Minnesota
Steve Irwin	Joey Witherspoon	Travis Taylor	Travis Saban	Brandon, Manitoba
David Kraichy	Andrew Irving	Taylor McIntyre	Brad Van Walleghem	Winnipeg, Manitoba
John Lilla	Aaron Nunberg	Bryan Hanson	Joel Cooper (Note: Cooper is now known as JayCee due to gender transition.)	St. Paul, Minnesota
Heath McCormick	Bill Stopera	Martin Sather	Dean Gemmell	(New York (state)) New York City, New York
Ben Mikkelsen	Taylor Kallos	Brian Skinner	Brendan Berbenuik	Thunder Bay, Ontario
Scott Ramsay	Mark Taylor	Ross McFadyen	Kyle Werenich	Winnipeg, Manitoba
John Shuster	Jeff Isaacson	Jared Zezel	John Landsteiner	Duluth, Minnesota
Peter Stolt	Brad Caldwell	Tim Jeanetta	Matt Fowler	Plymouth, Minnesota
Mark Willmert	Evan Jensen	Dan Ruehl	Daniel Metcalf	St. Paul, Minnesota

=== Round-robin standings ===
Final round-robin standings

Key
Teams to Playoffs

Pool A	W	L
(Wisconsin) Craig Brown	5	0
(Manitoba) David Kraichy	3	2
(Ontario) Bryan Burgess	2	3
(Wisconsin) Derrick Casper	2	3
(Massachusetts) Korey Dropkin	2	3
(Minnesota) Dale Gibbs	1	4

Pool B	W	L
(Manitoba) Scott Ramsay	4	1
(Minnesota) John Shuster	4	1
(Ontario) Brian Adams, Jr.	3	2
(Minnesota) John Lilla	3	2
(Minnesota) Mike Farbelow	1	4
(Pennsylvania) Scott Dunnam	0	5

Pool C	W	L
(Ontario) Jeff Currie	5	0
(Minnesota) Peter Stolt	3	2
(Minnesota) Todd Birr	3	2
(Minnesota) Eric Fenson	3	2
(New York (state)) Heath McCormick	1	4
(Minnesota) Mark Willmert	0	5

Pool D	W	L
(Ontario) Trevor Bonot	4	1
(Minnesota) Tyler George	4	1
(Manitoba) Steve Irwin	3	2
(Ontario) Ben Mikkelsen	3	2
(Minnesota) Geoff Goodland	1	4
(Minnesota) Matthew Carlson	0	5

=== Playoffs ===
Quarterfinals
(Wisconsin) Craig Brown	4
(Minnesota) Peter Stolt	5
(Manitoba) Scott Ramsay	6
(Ontario) Trevor Bonot	1
(Minnesota) Tyler George	5
(Manitoba) David Kraichy	4
(Ontario) Jeff Currie	5
(Minnesota) John Shuster	7

Semifinals
(Minnesota) Peter Stolt	4
(Manitoba) Scott Ramsay	5
(Minnesota) Tyler George	4
(Minnesota) John Shuster	3

Final
(Manitoba) Scott Ramsay	7
(Minnesota) Tyler George	4

== Women ==
The teams are listed as follows:

=== Teams ===
Skip	Third	Second	Lead	Locale
Amy Lou Anderson	Shelly Kinney	Theresa Hoffoss	Julie Smith	St. Paul, Minnesota
Sarah Anderson	Kathleen Dubberstein	Taylor Anderson	Leilani Dubberstein	Pennsylvania
Alexandra Carlson		Emilia Juocys	Sherri Schummer	St. Paul, Minnesota
Cory Christensen	Rebecca Funk	Anna Bauman	Sonja Bauman	Duluth, Minnesota
Courtney George	Aileen Sormunen	Amanda McLean	Monica Walker	St. Paul, Minnesota
Jenna Haag	Erin Wallace	Grace Gabower	Brittany Falk	Janesville, Wisconsin
Ashley Kallos	Oye-Sem Briand	Laura Vieira	Jessica Williams	Thunder Bay, Ontario
Michelle Montford	Lisa DeRiviere	Sara Van Walleghem	Sarah Neufeld	Winnipeg, Manitoba
Margie Smith	Norma O'Leary	Debbie Dexter	Shelly Kosal	St. Paul, Minnesota
Nina Spatola	Becca Hamilton	Tara Peterson	Sophie Brorson	Madison, Wisconsin
Maureen Stolt	Jordan Moulton	Kendall Behm	Libby Brundage	St. Paul, Minnesota
Kimberly Wapola	Brigid Knowles	Jennifer Westhagen	Courtney Shaw	St. Paul, Minnesota

=== Round-robin standings ===
Final round-robin standings

Key
Teams to Playoffs

Pool A	W	L
(Pennsylvania) Sarah Anderson	4	1
(Manitoba) Michelle Montford	4	1
(Minnesota) Courtney George	3	2
(Wisconsin) Jenna Haag	2	3
(Minnesota) Maureen Stolt	2	3
(Minnesota) Kimberly Wapola	0	5

Pool B	W	L
(Minnesota) Alexandra Carlson	4	1
(Wisconsin) Nina Spatola	4	1
(Ontario) Ashley Kallos	3	2
(Minnesota) Amy Lou Anderson	2	3
(Minnesota) Cory Christensen	1	4
(Minnesota) Margie Smith	1	4

=== Playoffs ===
Semifinals
1	(Manitoba) Michelle Montford	8
4	(Wisconsin) Nina Spatola	0
3	(Minnesota) Alexandra Carlson	6
2	(Pennsylvania) Sarah Anderson	4

Final
(Manitoba) Michelle Montford	7
(Minnesota) Alexandra Carlson	4
