= 2011 St. Paul Cash Spiel =

- Host city: St. Paul, Minnesota
- Arena: St. Paul Curling Club
- Dates: October 13–16
- Men's winner: (Minnesota) Tyler George
- Curling club: Duluth CC, Duluth
- Skip: Tyler George
- Third: Chris Plys
- Second: Rich Ruohonen
- Lead: Aanders Brorson
- Finalist: (Ontario) Jeff Currie
- Women's winner: (New York (state)) Patti Lank
- Curling club: Lewiston, New York
- Skip: Patti Lank
- Third: Nina Spatola
- Second: Caitlin Maroldo
- Lead: Molly Bonner
- Finalist: (Minnesota) Aileen Sormunen

The 2011 St. Paul Cash Spiel was held from October 13 to 16 at the St. Paul Curling Club in St. Paul, Minnesota, as part of the 2011–12 World Curling Tour. The purses for the men's and women's events were USD13,500 and USD7,200, respectively. The event was held in a round robin format.

== Men ==
=== Teams ===
Skip	Third	Second	Lead	Locale
Brian Adams Jr.	Mark Adams	Michael Makela	Phil Kennedy	Thunder Bay, Ontario
Josh Bahr	Chris Bond	Atticus Wallace	John Muller	Bemidji, Minnesota
Ryan Lemke (fourth)	John Benton (skip)	Steve Day	Joel Cooper (Note: Cooper is now known as JayCee due to gender transition.)	Medford, Wisconsin
Todd Birr	Greg Romaniuk	Doug Pottinger	Tom O'Connor	Mankato, Minnesota
Craig Brown	Matt Hamilton	Kroy Nernberger	Derrick Casper	Madison, Wisconsin
Bryan Burgess	Gary Weiss	Dale Wiersema	Pat Berezowski	Ontario
Randy Cumming	Mike Schneeberger	Vince Bernet	John Eustice	Mankato, Minnesota
Jeff Currie	Dylan Johnston	Cody Johnston	Mike Badiuk	Thunder Bay, Ontario
Philip DeVore	Pete Westberg	Seppo Sormunen	Duane Rutan	Duluth, Minnesota
Mike Farbelow	Kevin Deeren	Kraig Deeren	Tim Solin	Minneapolis, Minnesota
Eric Fenson	Trevor Andrews	Quentin Way	Mark Lazar	Bemidji, Minnesota
Tyler George	Chris Plys	Rich Ruohonen	Aanders Brorson	Duluth, Minnesota
Mark Haluptzok			John Chandler	Bemidji, Minnesota
Ian Journeaux	Dave Carison	Tim Funk	Ken Spatola	Poynette, Wisconsin
Adam Kitchens	Brandon Myhre	Alex Kitchens	Nathan Myhre	Devils Lake, North Dakota
Liu Rui	Xu Xiaoming	Zang Jialiang	Ba Dexin	Harbin, China
Ben Mikkelsen	Gary Maunula	Taylor Kallos	Brendan Berbenuik	Thunder Bay, Ontario
Paul Pustovar	Nick Myers	Andy Jukich	Jeff Puleo	Hibbing, Minnesota
Dan Ruehl	Joey Erjavec	Nick Ruehl	Noah Johnson	Plymouth, Minnesota
Joe Scharf	Mike McCarville	Rob Champagne	Gary Champagne	Thunder Bay, Ontario
John Shuster	Zach Jacobson	Jared Zezel	John Landsteiner	Duluth, Minnesota
Peter Stolt	Jerod Roland	Brad Caldwell	Erik Ordway	St. Paul, Minnesota
Derek Surka	Alex Leichter	Brian Fink	Jared Wydysh	New Haven, Connecticut
Evan Workin	Braden Burckhard	Ryan Westby	Jordan Brown	Fargo, North Dakota

=== Round Robin standings ===
Pool A	W	L
(Minnesota) Todd Birr	4	1
(Ontario) Jeff Currie	4	1
(Minnesota) Randy Cumming	3	2
(Minnesota) John Shuster	3	2
(Minnesota) Eric Fenson	1	4
(Wisconsin) Adam Kitchens	0	5

Pool B	W	L
(Wisconsin) John Benton	4	1
(Wisconsin) Craig Brown	4	1
(Ontario) Bryan Burgess	4	1
(Ontario) Ben Mikkelsen	2	3
(Connecticut) Derek Surka	1	4
(Wisconsin) Ian Journeaux	0	5

Pool C	W	L
(Minnesota) Tyler George	5	0
(Ontario) Joe Scharf	3	2
(Minnesota) Josh Bahr	3	2
(Minnesota) Peter Stolt	2	3
(Minnesota) Philip DeVore	1	4
(Minnesota) Dan Ruehl	1	4

Pool D	W	L
(China) Liu Rui	4	1
(Minnesota) Paul Pustovar	4	1
(Minnesota) Mike Farbelow	4	1
(Minnesota) Mark Haluptzok	2	3
(Ontario) Brian Adams Jr.	1	4
(Wisconsin) Evan Workin	0	5

=== Playoffs ===
Quarterfinals		Semifinals		Final
(Wisconsin) Craig Brown	5
(Minnesota) Paul Pustovar	4	(Wisconsin) Craig Brown	5
(Ontario) Jeff Currie	7	(Ontario) Jeff Currie	6
(Ontario) Joe Scharf	2			(Ontario) Jeff Currie	3
(Minnesota) Tyler George	6			(Minnesota) Tyler George	5
(Wisconsin) John Benton	0	(Minnesota) Tyler George	6
(China) Liu Rui	9	(China) Liu Rui	5
(Minnesota) Todd Birr	3

== Women ==
=== Teams ===
Skip	Third	Second	Lead	Locale
Amy Anderson	Hannah Augustin	Ann Flis	Karen Volkman	St. Paul, Minnesota
Alexandra Carlson	Monica Walker	Kendall Moulton	Jordan Moulton	Minneapolis, Minnesota
Marlo Dahl	Rhonda Skillen	Oye-Sem Won	Jessica Williams	Thunder Bay, Ontario
Brigid Ellig	Regan Mizuno	Heather Van Sistine	Brittany Falk	St. Paul, Minnesota
Rebecca Hamilton	Tara Peterson	Karlie Koenig	Sophie Brorson	Madison, Wisconsin
Shelly Kinney	Amy Lou Anderson	Elyse Sorenson	Julie Smith	St. Paul, Minnesota
Patti Lank	Nina Spatola	Caitlin Maroldo	Molly Bonner	(New York (state)) Lewiston, New York
Cassandra Potter	Jamie Haskell	Jackie Lemke	Steph Sambor	St. Paul, Minnesota
Marjorie Smith	Debbie Dexter	Shelly Kosal	Rachel Orvik	St. Paul, Minnesota
Aileen Sormunen	Courtney George	Amanda McLean	Miranda Solem	Duluth, Minnesota
Maureen Stolt	Megan Pond	Emilia Juocys	Sherri Schummer	St. Paul, Minnesota
Kimberly Wapola	Kali Gardner	Carol Strojny	Connie Kupferschmidt	St. Paul, Minnesota

=== Round Robin standings ===
Pool A	W	L
(Ontario) Marlo Dahl	4	1
(Minnesota) Marjorie Smith	3	2
(Wisconsin) Rebecca Hamilton	3	2
(Minnesota) Shelly Kinney	2	3
(Minnesota) Cassandra Potter	2	3
(Minnesota) Kimberly Wapola	1	4

Pool B	W	L
(Minnesota) Aileen Sormunen	4	1
(New York (state)) Patti Lank	4	1
(Minnesota) Maureen Stolt	4	1
(Minnesota) Alexandra Carlson	2	3
(Minnesota) Amy Anderson	1	4
(Minnesota) Brigid Ellig	0	5

=== Playoffs ===
Semifinals		Final
(Ontario) Marlo Dahl	2
(New York (state)) Patti Lank	4	(New York (state)) Patti Lank	5
(Minnesota) Aileen Sormunen	7	(Minnesota) Aileen Sormunen	4
(Minnesota) Marjorie Smith	3
