= 2012 St. Paul Cash Spiel =

World Curling Tour event

- Host city: St. Paul, Minnesota
- Arena: St. Paul Curling Club
- Dates: October 12–14
- Men's winner: (Minnesota) John Shuster
- Skip: John Shuster
- Third: Jeff Isaacson
- Second: Jared Zezel
- Lead: John Landsteiner
- Finalist: (Minnesota) Todd Birr
- Women's winner: (New York (state)) Patti Lank
- Skip: Patti Lank
- Third: Mackenzie Lank
- Second: Nina Spatola
- Lead: Caitlin Maroldo
- Finalist: (Minnesota) Margie Smith

The 2012 St. Paul Cash Spiel was held from October 12 to 14 at the St. Paul Curling Club in St. Paul, Minnesota as part of the 2012–13 World Curling Tour. The event was held in a round robin format, and the purses for the men's and women's events were USD16,000 and USD7,200, respectively. In the men's final, John Shuster defeated Todd Birr with a score of 6–4 to win his second World Curling Tour title as skip, while Patti Lank defeated Margie Smith in the women's final with a score of 7–2 to claim her second consecutive title at the St. Paul Cash Spiel.

== Men ==
=== Teams ===
The teams are listed as follows:

Skip	Third	Second	Lead	Locale
Kent Beadle	Randy Cumming	Vince Bernet	John Ustice	St. Paul, Minnesota
Ryan Berg	Al Gulseth	Mark Gulseth	Jordan Brown	West Fargo, North Dakota
Todd Birr	Doug Pottinger	Tom O'Connor	Kevin Birr	Mankato, Minnesota
Trevor Bonot	Allen Macsemchuk	Chris Briand	Tim Jewett	Thunder Bay, Ontario
Bryan Burgess	Mike Pozihun	Dale Weirsema	Pat Berezoski	Ontario
Jeffrey Erickson	Lionel Locke	Merlin Orvig	John Krenz	St. Paul, Minnesota
Mike Farbelow	Kevin Deeren	Kraig Deeren	Mark Lazar	St. Paul, Minnesota
Eric Fenson	Trevor Andrews	Blake Morton	Calvin Weber	Bemidji, Minnesota
Pete Fenson	Shawn Rojeski	Joe Polo	Ryan Brunt	Bemidji, Minnesota
Christopher Plys (fourth)	Tyler George (skip)	Rich Ruohonen	Colin Hufman	Duluth, Minnesota
Dale Gibbs	William Raymond	James Honsvall	Perry Tholl	St. Paul, Minnesota
Geoff Goodland	Tim Solin	Pete Westberg	Ken Olson	St. Paul, Minnesota
Evan Jensen	Daniel Metcalf	Dan Ruehl	Steve Gebauer	St. Paul, Minnesota
Dylan Johnston	Cody Johnston	Travis Showalter	Jay Turner	Thunder Bay, Ontario
Andy Jukich	Lyle Sige	Matt Zyblut	Duane Rutan	Duluth, Minnesota
Ryan Lemke	Nathan Gebert	John Lilla	Casey Konopacky	Medford, Wisconsin
Justin McBride	Ryan Harty	Mark Piskura	Joel Calhoun	Orange County, California
Ethan Meyers	Kyle Kakela	Trevor Host	Cameron Ross	Duluth, Minnesota
Matt Mielke	Alex Leichter	Nate Clark	Stephen Dropkin	Boston, Massachusetts
Kris Perkovich	Aaron Wald	Kevin Johnson	Taylor Skalsky	Chisholm, Minnesota
Greg Persinger	Nick Myers	Sean Murray	Tim Gartner	Fairbanks, Alaska
Jeff Puleo	Derek Surka	Joel Cooper (Note: Cooper is now known as JayCee due to gender transition.)	Cooper Smith	Forest Lake, Minnesota
John Shuster	Jeff Isaacson	Jared Zezel	John Landsteiner	Duluth, Minnesota
Evan Workin	Parker Shook	Cole Jaeger	Spencer Tuskowski	Fargo, North Dakota

=== Round-robin standings ===
Final round-robin standings

Key
Teams to Playoffs

Pool A	W	L
(Ontario) Dylan Johnston	4	1
(Minnesota) Pete Fenson	4	1
(Minnesota) Andy Jukich	3	2
(Wisconsin) Ryan Lemke	3	2
(Massachusetts) Matt Mielke	1	4
(California) Justin McBride	0	5

Pool B	W	L
(Minnesota) John Shuster	4	1
(Minnesota) Geoff Goodland	4	1
(Minnesota) Eric Fenson	3	2
(Alaska) Greg Persinger	3	2
(Minnesota) Jeffrey Erickson	1	4
(North Dakota) Evan Workin	0	5

Pool C	W	L
(Minnesota) Todd Birr	5	0
(Minnesota) Kris Perkovich	3	2
(Ontario) Trevor Bonot	3	2
(Minnesota) Mike Farbelow	2	3
(Minnesota) Dale Gibbs	1	4
(Minnesota) Jeff Puleo	1	4

Pool D	W	L
(Minnesota) Tyler George	5	0
(Ontario) Bryan Burgess	4	1
(Minnesota) Ethan Meyers	3	2
(Minnesota) Evan Jensen	2	3
(Minnesota) Kent Beadle	1	4
(North Dakota) Ryan Berg	0	5

=== Playoffs ===
Quarterfinals
(Ontario) Dylan Johnston	9
(Minnesota) Kris Perkovich	3
(Minnesota) John Shuster	6
(Ontario) Bryan Burgess	2
(Minnesota) Tyler George	7
(Minnesota) Pete Fenson	2
(Minnesota) Todd Birr	7
(Minnesota) Geoff Goodland	3

Semifinals
(Ontario) Dylan Johnston	3
(Minnesota) John Shuster	7
(Minnesota) Tyler George	4
(Minnesota) Todd Birr	6

Final
(Minnesota) John Shuster	6
(Minnesota) Todd Birr	4

== Women ==
=== Teams ===
The teams are listed as follows:

Skip	Third	Second	Lead	Locale
Alexandra Carlson	Monica Walker	Kendall Moulton	Jordan Moulton	Minneapolis, Minnesota
Cory Christensen	Rebecca Funk	Anna Bauman	Sonja Bauman	Duluth, Minnesota
Gabrielle Coleman	Britt Rjanikov	Ann Drummie	Mary Shields	San Francisco, California
Brigid Ellig	Heather Van Sistine	Sara Shuster	Julia Boles	St. Paul, Minnesota
Rebecca Hamilton	Molly Bonner	Tara Peterson	Sophie Brorson	Madison, Wisconsin
Shelly Kinney	Amy Lou Anderson	Theresa Hoffoss	Julie Smith	Minnesota
Patti Lank	Mackenzie Lank	Nina Spatola	Caitlin Maroldo	(New York (state)) Lewiston, New York
Charrissa Lin	Sherri Schummer	Emilia Juocys	Senja Lopac	New Haven, Connecticut
Joyance Meechai	Casey Cucchiarelli	Jen Cahak	Courtney Shaw	(New York (state)) New York, New York
Cassandra Potter	Jamie Haskell	Jackie Lemke	Steph Sambor	St. Paul, Minnesota
Margie Smith	Norma O'Leary	Debbie Dexter	Shelly Kosal	St. Paul, Minnesota
Miranda Solem	Vicky Persenger	Karlie Koenig	Chelsea Solem	Cohasset, Minnesota

=== Round-robin standings ===
Final round-robin standings

Key
Teams to Playoffs
Teams to Tiebreaker

Pool A	W	L
(Minnesota) Cassandra Potter	4	1
(Minnesota) Margie Smith	3	2
(Minnesota) Alexandra Carlson	3	2
(Minnesota) Shelly Kinney	3	2
(Minnesota) Cory Christensen	2	3
(New York (state)) Joyance Meechai	0	5

Pool B	W	L
(Wisconsin) Rebecca Hamilton	4	1
(New York (state)) Patti Lank	4	1
(Minnesota) Miranda Solem	4	1
(Connecticut) Charrissa Lin	2	3
(California) Gabrielle Coleman	1	4
(Minnesota) Brigid Ellig	0	5

=== Tiebreaker ===
Team	Final
(New York (state)) Patti Lank	7
(Minnesota) Miranda Solem	3

=== Playoffs ===
Semifinals
1	(Wisconsin) Rebecca Hamilton	5
4	(Minnesota) Margie Smith	6
3	(Minnesota) Cassandra Potter	3
2	(New York (state)) Patti Lank	4

Final
(Minnesota) Margie Smith	2
(New York (state)) Patti Lank	7
