= 2010 St. Paul Cash Spiel =

- Host city: St. Paul, Minnesota
- Arena: St. Paul Curling Club
- Dates: October 15–17, 2010
- Winner: Tyler George
- Curling club: Minnesota
- Skip: Tyler George
- Third: Christopher Plys
- Second: Rich Ruohonen
- Lead: Phill Drobnick
- Finalist: Bryan Burgess

The 2010 St. Paul Cash Spiel was held at the St. Paul Curling Club in St. Paul, Minnesota from October 15–17, 2010 as a part of the World Curling Tour. The tournament included 24 teams participating in round-robin play, and included 8 playoff games. The purse is US$13,500. The event was unusual among WCT events, as there were two women's teams, Aileen Sormunen's rink and the Kimberly Wapola rink.

== Teams ==
Group	Skip	Third	Second	Lead	Locale
Group A	Bryan Burgess	Gary Weiss	Dale Wiersema	Pat Berzowski	(Ontario) Thunder Bay
Group A	Alex Leichter	Chris Bond	Nate Clark	Jared Wydysh	Wayland, Massachusetts
Group A	Aileen Sormunen	Courtney George	Amanda McLean	Miranda Solem	St. Paul, Minnesota
Group A	Tyler George	Christopher Plys	Rich Ruohonen	Phill Drobnick	Duluth, Minnesota
Group A	Geoff Goodland	Pete Westberg	Tim Solin	Ken Olson	Eau Claire, Wisconsin
Group A	Jerod Roland	John Lilla	Adam Nathan	Cooper Smith	Minot, North Dakota
Group B	Craig Brown	John Shuster	Greg Johnson	Derrick Casper	Wisconsin
Group B	Ryan Berg	Al Grunseth	Ewan Workin	Jordan Brown	West Fargo, North Dakota
Group B	Aaron Wald	Josh Bahr	Jared Zezel	John Muller	Hibbing, Minnesota
Group B	Randy Cumming	Mike Schneeberger	Tim Solie	Vince Bernet	Mankato, Minnesota
Group B	Allen Macsemchuk	Jason Repay	Tim Jewett	Steve Whitehurst	(Ontario) Thunder Bay
Group B	Zach Jacobson	Kevin Deeren	Kraig Deeren	Zane Jacobson	Langdon, North Dakota
Group C	Pete Fenson	Shawn Rojeski	Joe Polo	Ryan Brunt	Bemidji, Minnesota
Group C	Kelly Marnoch	Kevin Hamblin	Tyler Waterhouse	Chris Cameron	Carberry, Manitoba
Group C	Kroy Nernberger	Ryan Lemke	Jake Will	Steve Day	Madison, Wisconsin
Group C	Rob Fleming	Brad Wainikka	Warren Alexander	Jamie Hartry	Morden, Manitoba
Group C	Jerry VanBrunt	Jim Hideman	Brett Gleeson	Brock Gleeson	Colorado Springs, Colorado
Group C	Tony Wright	Ethan Meyers	Trevor Host	Wes Leksell	Duluth, Minnesota
Group D	Mike Pozihun	Deron Surkan	B.J. Skinner	Aaron Rogalski	(Ontario) Thunder Bay
Group D	Mike Farbelow	Eric Fenson	Nick Myers	Aaron Nunberg	St. Paul, Minnesota
Group D	Greg Eigner	Richard Maskel	Dwayne Jacobson	Lionel Locke	Fort Wayne, Indiana
Group D	John Benton	Peter Stolt	Jeff Puleo	Erik Ordway	St. Paul, Minnesota
Group D	Kimberly Wapola	Ashley Schaffer	Emilia Juocys	Heather Van Sistine	Mahtomedi, Minnesota
Group D	Brad Haight (fourth)	Trevor Loreth (skip)	Ryan Lowdon	Brett Cawson	(Manitoba) Winnipeg

== Round robin ==
=== Standings ===
Group A			Group B			Group C			Group D		
Skip	W	L	Skip	W	L	Skip	W	L	Skip	W	L
(Ontario) Bryan Burgess	5	0	(Wisconsin) Craig Brown	4	1	(Minnesota) Pete Fenson	4	1	(Ontario) Mike Pozihun	4	1
(Minnesota) Tyler George	3	2	(Minnesota) Aaron Wald	3	2	(Manitoba) Kelly Marnoch	4	1	(Minnesota) Mike Farbelow	3	1
(Massachusetts) Alex Leichter	3	2	(North Dakota) Zach Jacobson	3	2	(Wisconsin) Kroy Nerberger	4	1	(Manitoba) Trevor Loreth	3	2
(North Dakota) Jerod Roland	2	3	(North Dakota) Ryan Berg	2	3	(Manitoba) Rob Fleming	2	3	(Minnesota) John Benton	2	2
(Wisconsin) Geoff Goodland	1	4	(Minnesota) Randy Cumming	2	3	(Minnesota) Tony Wright	1	4	(Indiana) Greg Eigner	1	3
(Minnesota) Aileen Sormunen	1	4	(Ontario) Allen Macsemchuk	1	4	(Colorado) Jerry VanBrunt	0	5	(Minnesota) Kimberly Wapola	0	4

=== Results ===
==== Draw 1 ====
Friday, October 15, 10:00 am

Sheet 2	1	2	3	4	5	6	7	8	Final
(Massachusetts) Leichter	1	0	0	0	1	1	0	1	4
(Wisconsin) Goodland	0	2	1	0	0	0	0	0	3

Sheet 3	1	2	3	4	5	6	7	8	Final
(Minnesota) Wald	0	4	0	1	2	0	0	1	8
(Ontario) Macsemchuk	1	0	2	0	0	1	1	0	5

Sheet 4	1	2	3	4	5	6	7	8	Final
(Minnesota) Cumming	0	1	0	0	0	0	0	X	1
(North Dakota) Jacobson	1	0	0	0	2	1	1	X	5

Sheet 5	1	2	3	4	5	6	7	8	9	Final
(Minnesota) George	0	0	0	0	1	0	0	2	2	5
(North Dakota) Roland	0	0	0	0	0	1	2	0	0	3

Sheet 6	1	2	3	4	5	6	7	8	Final
(Ontario) Burgess	0	1	1	1	0	2	0	1	6
(Minnesota) Sormunen	1	0	0	0	2	0	1	0	4

Sheet 7	1	2	3	4	5	6	7	8	Final
(Wisconsin) Brown	2	0	0	2	0	2	1	X	7
(North Dakota) Berg	0	1	1	0	2	0	0	X	4

==== Draw 2 ====
Friday, October 15, 12:30 pm

Sheet 2	1	2	3	4	5	6	7	8	Final
(Wisconsin) Nernberger	1	1	0	1	1	0	1	1	6
(Manitoba) Fleming	0	0	2	0	0	2	0	0	4

Sheet 3	1	2	3	4	5	6	7	8	Final
(Minnesota) Farbelow	2	0	2	0	0	2	4	X	10
(Minnesota) Wapola	0	1	0	1	1	0	0	X	3

Sheet 4	1	2	3	4	5	6	7	8	Final
(Minnesota) Benton	0	0	0	0	0	X	X	X	0
(Manitoba) Loreth	1	2	1	2	2	X	X	X	7

Sheet 5	1	2	3	4	5	6	7	8	Final
(Minnesota) Fenson	1	0	2	0	1	0	4	X	8
(Minnesota) Wright	0	1	0	0	0	2	0	X	3

Sheet 6	1	2	3	4	5	6	7	8	Final
(Manitoba) Marnoch	3	2	1	X	X	X	X	X	6
(Colorado) VanBrunt	0	0	0	X	X	X	X	X	0

Sheet 7	1	2	3	4	5	6	7	8	Final
(Ontario) Pozihun	0	2	0	2	3	1	X	X	8
(Indiana) Eigner	1	0	1	0	0	0	X	X	2

==== Draw 3 ====
Friday, October 15, 3:30 pm

Sheet 2	1	2	3	4	5	6	7	8	Final
(Wisconsin) Brown	0	1	2	2	2	X	X	X	7
(Minnesota) Wald	0	0	0	0	0	X	X	X	0

Sheet 3	1	2	3	4	5	6	7	8	Final
(North Dakota) Berg	0	0	0	0	1	X	X	X	1
(North Dakota) Jacobson	0	1	1	2	0	X	X	X	4

Sheet 4	1	2	3	4	5	6	7	8	Final
(Minnesota) Sormunen	0	0	1	2	0	0	0	X	3
(Minnesota) George	2	0	0	0	2	2	1	X	7

Sheet 5	1	2	3	4	5	6	7	8	Final
(Minnesota) Cumming	0	0	0	1	0	X	X	X	1
(Ontario) Macsemchuk	0	2	1	0	3	X	X	X	6

Sheet 6	1	2	3	4	5	6	7	8	9	Final
(Massachusetts) Leichter	0	0	0	0	1	0	2	1	1	5
(North Dakota) Roland	0	3	0	0	0	1	0	0	0	4

Sheet 7	1	2	3	4	5	6	7	8	Final
(Ontario) Burgess	1	0	4	1	0	1	X	X	7
(Wisconsin) Goodland	0	1	0	0	1	0	X	X	2

==== Draw 4 ====
Friday, October 15, 6:00 pm

Sheet 2	1	2	3	4	5	6	7	8	Final
(Minnesota) Farbelow	0	1	0	1	0	1	0	2	5
(Indiana) Eigner	1	0	1	0	1	0	0	0	3

Sheet 3	1	2	3	4	5	6	7	8	Final
(Ontario) Pozihun	0	0	0	1	1	1	0	X	3
(Minnesota) Benton	2	1	3	0	0	0	1	X	7

Sheet 4	1	2	3	4	5	6	7	8	Final
(Minnesota) Fenson	0	2	1	1	0	4	X	X	8
(Colorado) VanBrunt	0	0	0	0	1	0	X	X	1

Sheet 5	1	2	3	4	5	6	7	8	Final
(Minnesota) Wapola	0	1	0	0	0	0	X	X	1
(Manitoba) Loreth	3	0	1	1	1	3	X	X	9

Sheet 6	1	2	3	4	5	6	7	8	Final
(Manitoba) Fleming	0	1	1	1	0	0	0	3	6
(Minnesota) Wright	1	0	0	0	1	1	1	0	4

Sheet 7	1	2	3	4	5	6	7	8	Final
(Manitoba) Marnoch	0	0	1	1	0	0	1	0	3
(Wisconsin) Nernberger	1	0	0	0	1	1	0	1	4

==== Draw 5 ====
Friday, October 15, 9:00 pm

Sheet 2	1	2	3	4	5	6	7	8	Final
(Minnesota) Sormunen	1	0	0	1	0	2	2	0	6
(North Dakota) Roland	0	3	2	0	2	0	0	2	9

Sheet 3	1	2	3	4	5	6	7	8	Final
(Minnesota) George	0	0	2	0	0	2	0	X	4
(Wisconsin) Goodland	2	0	0	2	1	0	4	X	9

Sheet 4	1	2	3	4	5	6	7	8	Final
(Ontario) Burgess	0	1	0	1	2	2	X	X	6
(Massachusetts) Leichter	0	0	1	0	0	0	X	X	1

Sheet 5	1	2	3	4	5	6	7	8	Final
(North Dakota) Berg	1	1	0	0	0	1	0	X	3
(Minnesota) Wald	0	0	1	2	1	0	2	X	6

Sheet 6	1	2	3	4	5	6	7	8	9	Final
(Wisconsin) Brown	0	0	2	1	0	0	2	0	0	5
(Minnesota) Cumming	0	1	0	0	2	2	0	0	1	6

Sheet 7	1	2	3	4	5	6	7	8	Final
(Ontario) Macsemchuk	0	3	0	1	0	0	1	0	5
(North Dakota) Jacobson	0	0	2	0	2	1	0	1	6

==== Draw 6 ====
Saturday, October 16, 8:00 am

Sheet 2	1	2	3	4	5	6	7	8	Final
(Colorado) VanBrunt	0	0	1	0	0	X	X	X	1
(Minnesota) Wright	2	4	0	2	3	X	X	X	11

Sheet 3	1	2	3	4	5	6	7	8	9	Final
(Minnesota) Fenson	1	0	0	2	0	1	1	0	1	6
(Wisconsin) Nernberger	0	0	1	0	2	0	0	2	0	5

Sheet 4	1	2	3	4	5	6	7	8	Final
(Manitoba) Marnoch	5	0	0	0	3	X	X	X	8
(Manitoba) Fleming	0	0	2	1	0	X	X	X	3

Sheet 5	1	2	3	4	5	6	7	8	Final
(Ontario) Pozihun	2	0	3	0	1	2	X	X	8
(Minnesota) Farbelow	0	1	0	2	0	0	X	X	3

Sheet 6	1	2	3	4	5	6	7	8	Final
(Indiana) Eigner	0	1	0	1	0	1	0	0	3
(Manitoba) Loreth	1	0	3	0	1	0	0	0	5

Sheet 7	1	2	3	4	5	6	7	8	Final
(Minnesota) Benton	0	1	0	2	1	0	5	X	9
(Minnesota) Wapola	2	0	1	0	0	1	0	X	4

==== Draw 7 ====
Saturday, October 16, 10:30 am

Sheet 2	1	2	3	4	5	6	7	8	Final
(Ontario) Burgess	1	1	2	2	X	X	X	X	6
(Minnesota) George	0	0	0	0	X	X	X	X	0

Sheet 3	1	2	3	4	5	6	7	8	Final
(Massachusetts) Leichter	0	1	0	1	0	2	1	1	7
(Minnesota) Sormunen	1	0	3	0	2	0	0	0	6

Sheet 4	1	2	3	4	5	6	7	8	Final
(Wisconsin) Goodland	2	0	1	1	0	1	0	0	5
(North Dakota) Roland	0	3	0	0	1	0	1	1	6

Sheet 5	1	2	3	4	5	6	7	8	Final
(Wisconsin) Brown	0	2	1	0	2	1	0	X	6
(North Dakota) Jacobson	0	0	0	2	0	0	2	X	4

Sheet 6	1	2	3	4	5	6	7	8	Final
(North Dakota) Berg	2	1	0	0	3	1	X	X	7
(Ontario) Macsemchuk	0	0	1	1	0	0	X	X	2

Sheet 7	1	2	3	4	5	6	7	8	Final
(Minnesota) Wald	0	1	0	1	0	0	X	X	2
(Minnesota) Cumming	1	0	1	0	4	1	X	X	7

==== Draw 8 ====
Saturday, October 16, 1:30 pm

Sheet 2	1	2	3	4	5	6	7	8	Final
(Minnesota) Fenson	0	1	0	2	0	0	3	0	6
(Manitoba) Marnoch	2	0	1	0	0	2	0	2	7

Sheet 3	1	2	3	4	5	6	7	8	Final
(Manitoba) Fleming	0	1	1	0	0	0	2	2	6
(Colorado) VanBrunt	1	0	0	1	1	1	0	0	4

Sheet 4	1	2	3	4	5	6	7	8	Final
(Wisconsin) Nernberger	4	0	2	1	2	0	X	X	9
(Minnesota) Wright	0	4	0	0	0	1	X	X	5

Sheet 5	1	2	3	4	5	6	7	8	Final
(Indiana) Eigner	1	1	0	4	0	X	X	X	6
(Minnesota) Benton	0	0	2	0	2	X	X	X	4

Sheet 6	1	2	3	4	5	6	7	8	Final
(Ontario) Pozihun	4	0	3	0	6	X	X	X	13
(Minnesota) Wapola	0	1	0	1	0	X	X	X	2

Sheet 7	1	2	3	4	5	6	7	8	9	Final
(Minnesota) Farbelow	0	1	1	1	0	0	3	0	1	7
(Manitoba) Loreth	2	0	0	0	1	1	0	2	0	6

==== Draw 9 ====
Saturday, October 16, 4:30 pm

Sheet 2	1	2	3	4	5	6	7	8	Final
(North Dakota) Berg	4	1	0	1	0	0	1	X	7
(Minnesota) Cumming	0	0	1	0	2	1	0	X	4

Sheet 3	1	2	3	4	5	6	7	8	Final
(Ontario) Burgess	2	0	0	1	1	2	0	X	6
(North Dakota) Roland	0	2	1	0	0	0	1	X	4

Sheet 4	1	2	3	4	5	6	7	8	Final
(Wisconsin) Brown	1	0	2	2	X	X	X	X	5
(Ontario) Macsemchuk	0	1	0	0	X	X	X	X	1

Sheet 5	1	2	3	4	5	6	7	8	Final
(Minnesota) Sormunen	0	0	2	0	1	X	X	X	3
(Wisconsin) Goodland	0	1	0	1	0	X	X	X	2

Sheet 6	1	2	3	4	5	6	7	8	Final
(Minnesota) Wald	1	1	1	0	1	1	X	X	5
(North Dakota) Jacobson	0	0	0	1	0	0	X	X	1

Sheet 7	1	2	3	4	5	6	7	8	Final
(Massachusetts) Leichter	0	0	2	0	2	0	X	X	4
(Minnesota) George	2	0	0	4	0	3	X	X	9

==== Draw 10 ====
Saturday, October 16, 7:00 pm

Sheet 2	1	2	3	4	5	6	7	8	Final
(Ontario) Pozihun	2	2	0	1	0	1	X	X	6
(Manitoba) Loreth	0	0	1	0	1	0	X	X	2

Sheet 3	1	2	3	4	5	6	7	8	Final
(Manitoba) Marnoch	3	2	0	1	X	X	X	X	6
(Minnesota) Wright	0	0	1	0	X	X	X	X	1

Sheet 4	1	2	3	4	5	6	7	8	Final
(Indiana) Eigner	0	1	1	2	0	0	0	3	7
(Minnesota) Wapola	2	0	0	0	2	2	0	0	6

Sheet 5	1	2	3	4	5	6	7	8	Final
(Wisconsin) Nernberger	2	0	3	0	1	0	1	0	7
(Colorado) VanBrunt	0	1	0	1	0	3	0	1	6

Sheet 6	1	2	3	4	5	6	7	8	Final
(Minnesota) Farbelow	1	0	1	0	0	3	0	3	8
(Minnesota) Benton	0	2	0	1	1	0	2	0	6

Sheet 7	1	2	3	4	5	6	7	8	Final
(Minnesota) Fenson	0	3	0	0	0	2	2	X	7
(Manitoba) Fleming	1	0	1	1	1	0	0	X	4

== Playoffs ==
Quarterfinals; 9:00 am
(Ontario) Bryan Burgess	5
(Minnesota) Pete Fenson	3
(Wisconsin) Craig Brown	3
(Minnesota) Mike Farbelow	6
(Ontario) Mike Pozihun	1
(Minnesota) Tyler George	5
(Manitoba) Kelly Marnoch	3
(Minnesota) Aaron Wald	7

Semifinals; 12:00 pm
(Ontario) Burgess	7
(Minnesota) Farbelow	3
(Minnesota) George	6
(Minnesota) Wald	3

Final; 2:30 pm
(Ontario) Burgess	2
(Minnesota) George	4

=== Quarterfinals ===
Sunday, October 17, 9:00 am

Team	1	2	3	4	5	6	7	8	Final
(Ontario) Burgess	1	0	0	2	0	2	0	X	5
(Minnesota) Fenson	0	0	1	0	1	0	1	X	3

Team	1	2	3	4	5	6	7	8	Final
(Wisconsin) Brown	0	1	0	1	0	0	1	X	3
(Minnesota) Farbelow	1	0	2	0	1	1	0	X	6

Team	1	2	3	4	5	6	7	8	Final
(Ontario) Pozihun	0	0	0	1	X	X	X	X	1
(Minnesota) George	0	4	1	0	X	X	X	X	5

Team	1	2	3	4	5	6	7	8	Final
(Ontario) Marnoch	2	0	0	0	0	1	0	X	3
(Minnesota) Wald	0	1	1	1	1	0	3	X	7

=== Semifinals ===
Sunday, October 17, 12:00 pm

Team	1	2	3	4	5	6	7	8	Final
(Ontario) Burgess	0	2	0	1	1	0	3	X	7
(Minnesota) Farbelow	1	0	1	0	0	1	0	X	3

Team	1	2	3	4	5	6	7	8	Final
(Minnesota) George	2	0	0	0	3	0	1	X	6
(Minnesota) Wald	0	1	0	1	0	1	0	X	3

=== Final ===
Sunday, October 17, 2:30 pm

Team	1	2	3	4	5	6	7	8	Final
(Ontario) Burgess	0	0	0	0	0	1	1	0	2
(Minnesota) George	0	3	0	0	0	0	0	1	4
