= 2017 St. Paul Cash Spiel =

World Curling Tour event

- Host city: St. Paul, Minnesota
- Arena: St. Paul Curling Club
- Dates: October 6–8
- Men's winner: (Minnesota) Heath McCormick
- Curling club: Four Seasons CC, Blaine, Minnesota
- Skip: Heath McCormick
- Third: Christopher Plys
- Second: Korey Dropkin
- Lead: Thomas Howell
- Finalist: (Minnesota) Sean Murray
- Women's winner: (Minnesota) Jessica Schultz
- Curling club: St. Paul CC, St. Paul, Minnesota
- Skip: Jessica Schultz
- Third: Courtney George
- Second: Jordan Moulton
- Lead: Stephanie Senneker
- Finalist: (Minnesota) Cora Farrell

The 2017 St. Paul Cash Spiel was held from October 6 to 8 at the St. Paul Curling Club in St. Paul, Minnesota as part of the 2017–18 World Curling Tour. Both the men's and women's event were held in a round robin format.

== Men ==
=== Teams ===
The teams are listed as follows:

| Skip | Third | Second | Lead | Locale |
|---|---|---|---|---|
| Josh Bahr | Aaron Wald | Jon Chandler | Mark Haluptzok | Bemidji, Minnesota |
| Todd Birr | Hunter Clawson | John Benton | Tom O'Connor | Blaine, Minnesota |
| Craig Brown | Kroy Nernberger | Jason Smith | Sean Beighton | Madison, Wisconsin |
| Brady Clark | Greg Persinger | Colin Hufman | Phil Tilker | (Washington (state)) Seattle, Washington |
| Nicholas Connolly | Andrew Dunnam | Jonathan Harstad | Chase Sinnett | (Washington (state)) Seattle, Washington |
| Scott Dunnam | Cody Clouser | Trevor Host | Ethan Meyers | Minneapolis, Minnesota |
| Pete Fenson | Shawn Rojeski | Mark Fenner | Alex Fenson | Bemidji, Minnesota |
| Timothy Hodek | Skyler Slusar | John Lindgren | Ethan Sampson | Fargo, North Dakota |
| Darryl Horsman | Sean Stevinson | Phil Moir | Eric Kowal | Phoenix, Arizona |
| Dylan Johnston | Mike Badiuk | Cody Johnston | Travis Showalter | Thunder Bay, Ontario |
| Colin Koivula | Brennan Wark | Jordan Potts | Mark Adams | Thunder Bay, Ontario |
| Bob Leclair | Greg Gallagher | Jeff Baird | Tom Danielson | Tempe, Arizona |
| Alex Leichter | Martin Sather | Chris Bond | Jared Wydysh | Boston, Massachusetts |
| Justin McBride | Erik Jensen | Sean Franey | Joel Calhoun | San Francisco, California |
| Heath McCormick | Chris Plys | Korey Dropkin | Thomas Howell | Blaine, Minnesota |
| Josh Moore | Derek Moore | Nicholas Steinhaus | Eric Jaeger | Mapleton, Minnesota |
| Sean Murray | Matt Mielke | Matthew Carlson | Dan Ruehl | Blaine, Minnesota |
| Cameron Rittenour | Jed Brundidge | Evan Workin | Jordan Brown | Sioux Falls, South Dakota |
| Darryl Sobering | Aaron Johnston | Evan Jaffe | Josh Chetwynd | Denver, Colorado |
| Andrew Stopera | Luc Violette | Ben Richardson | Graem Fenson | Chicago, Illinois |
| Bill Stopera | Dean Gemmell | Michael Moore | Mark Lazar | (New York (state)) New York, New York |
| Willie Wilberg | Dwayne Jacobson | Ryan Kernosky | Richard Maskel | Madison, Wisconsin |

=== Round-robin standings ===
Key
| Teams to Playoffs |

| Pool A | W | L |
|---|---|---|
| (Illinois) Andrew Stopera | 4 | 1 |
| (Massachusetts) Alex Leichter | 4 | 1 |
| (Wisconsin) Craig Brown | 4 | 1 |
| (Wisconsin) Willie Wilberg | 2 | 3 |
| (California) Justin McBride | 1 | 4 |
| (North Dakota) Timothy Hodek | 0 | 5 |

| Pool B | W | L |
|---|---|---|
| (Ontario) Colin Kolvula | 4 | 1 |
| (Minnesota) Todd Birr | 3 | 2 |
| (South Dakota) Cameron Rittenour | 3 | 2 |
| (Minnesota) Pete Fenson | 3 | 2 |
| (Arizona) Bob LeClair | 2 | 3 |
| (Colorado) Darryl Sobering | 0 | 5 |

| Pool C | W | L |
|---|---|---|
| (Minnesota) Heath McCormick | 4 | 0 |
| (New York (state)) Bill Stopera | 3 | 1 |
| (Minnesota) Scott Dunnam | 1 | 2 |
| (Minnesota) Josh Moore | 1 | 2 |
| (Arizona) Darryl Horsman | 0 | 4 |

| Pool D | W | L |
|---|---|---|
| (Washington (state)) Brady Clark | 4 | 0 |
| (Minnesota) Sean Murray | 2 | 2 |
| (Washington (state)) Nicolas Connolly | 2 | 2 |
| (Minnesota) Josh Bahr | 1 | 3 |
| (Ontario) Dylan Johnston | 0 | 4 |

=== Playoffs ===
Quarterfinals
(Massachusetts) Alex Liechter | 6
(Minnesota) Sean Murray | 7
(Ontario) Colin Koivula | 5
(New York (state)) Bill Stopera | 8
(Minnesota) Heath McCormick | 8
(Minnesota) Todd Birr | 2
(Washington (state)) Brady Clark | 4
(Wisconsin) Craig Brown | 6

Semifinals
(Minnesota) Sean Murray | 7
(New York (state)) Bill Stopera | 4
(Minnesota) Heath McCormick | 7
(Wisconsin) Craig Brown | 6

Final
(Minnesota) Sean Murray | 4
(Minnesota) Heath McCormick | 5

== Women ==
=== Teams ===
The teams are listed as follows:

| Skip | Third | Second | Lead | Locale |
|---|---|---|---|---|
| Madison Bear | Annmarie Dubberstein | Jenna Burchesky | Allison Howell | St. Paul, Minnesota |
| Cora Farrell | Cait Flannery | Lexi Lanigan | Rebecca Miles | Blaine, Minnesota |
| Christine McMakin | Alyson Deegan | Anna Netteberg | Mairin Barrett | St. Paul, Minnesota |
| Ann Podoll | Carissa Muller | Rachel Workin | Christina Lammers | Fargo, North Dakota |
| Rebecca Andrew (Fourth) | Kim Rhyme (Skip) | Katie Rhyme | Amy Harnden | Blaine, Minnesota |
| Jessica Schultz | Courtney George | Jordan Moulton | Stephanie Senneker | St. Paul, Minnesota |

=== Round-robin standings ===
Key
| Teams to Playoffs |
| Teams to Tiebreaker |

| 4 game Guarantee | W | L |
|---|---|---|
| (Minnesota) Jessica Schultz | 3 | 1 |
| (Minnesota) Madison Bear | 2 | 2 |
| (Minnesota) Kim Rhyme | 2 | 2 |
| (Minnesota) Cora Farrell | 2 | 2 |
| (North Dakota) Ann Podell | 2 | 2 |
| (Minnesota) Cristine MacMakin | 1 | 3 |

=== Playoffs ===
Semifinals
1 | (Minnesota) Jessica Schultz | 6
4 | (Minnesota) Kim Rhyme | 4
3 | (Minnesota) Cora Farrell | 5
2 | (Minnesota) Madison Bear | 2

Final
(Minnesota) Jessica Schultz | 6
(Minnesota) Cora Farrell | 5
