= 2026 St. Paul Cashspiel =

- Host city: St. Paul, Minnesota
- Arena: St. Paul Curling Club
- Dates: October 8–11
- Men's winner: (Minnesota) Team Shuster
- Curling club: Duluth CC, Duluth
- Skip: John Shuster
- Third: Andrew Stopera
- Second: Mark Fenner
- Lead: Lance Wheeler
- Finalist: (Manitoba) Jace Freeman
- Women's winner: (Minnesota) Team O'Hara
- Curling club: Chaska CC, Chaska
- Skip: Anne O'Hara
- Third: Anya Normandeau
- Second: Sydney Mullaney
- Lead: Ella Fleming
- Finalist: (Japan) Satsuki Fujisawa

The 2026 St. Paul Cashspiel was held from October 8 to 11 at the St. Paul Curling Club in St. Paul, Minnesota. The total purse for the event was $25,000 on the men's side and $20,700 on the women's side.

For the 2026–27 season, the event was a satellite Grand Slam of Curling event. The highest ranking non-qualified team on the men's and women's sides earned a spot at the 2026 GSOC National, held in Sydney, Nova Scotia. As the winners of the men's and women's event respectively, Teams John Shuster and Anne O'Hara of Minnesota qualified for the slam.

== Men ==
=== Teams ===
The teams are listed as follows:

Skip	Third	Second	Lead	Alternate	Locale
Félix Asselin	Julien Tremblay	Jesse Mullen	Jean-Michel Arsenault		Laval, Quebec
Cyrus Brandt (Fourth)	Zane Brandt (Skip)	Stefan Gudmundson	Gabriel Brandt		Steinbach, Manitoba
Wesley Wendling (Fourth)	Aaron Carlson (Skip)	Nicholas Cenzalli	Shaheen Bassiri		Chaska, Minnesota
Daniel Casper	Luc Violette	Ben Richardson	Aidan Oldenburg		Chaska, Minnesota
Jordan Chandler	Landan Rooney	Connor Lawes	Nathan Kim		Little Current, Ontario
Scott Dunnam	Cody Clouser	Alex Leichter	Andrew Dunnam		Philadelphia, Pennsylvania
Birgen Enberg	Nick Ruohonen	Sawyer Heger	Hudson Stanonik		Duluth, Minnesota
Dallas Burgess (Fourth)	Jace Freeman (Skip)	Ryan Ostrowsky	Aaron Macdonell		Virden, Manitoba
Caden Hebert	Jackson Bestland	Benji Paral	Jack Wendtland		Eau Claire, Wisconsin
Tucker Hellman	Carter Hellman	Luke Shuster	– (Note: Team Hellman played with three players.)		San Francisco, California
Timothy Hodek	Evan Workin	Josh Moore	Nathan Parry	Ethan Sampson	Fargo, North Dakota
Austin Kadlec	Sawyer Koch	Zac Hess	Martin Brown		Rice Lake, Wisconsin
Bob Leclair	Fred Maxie	Jeff Baird	Brian Onken		Tempe, Arizona
Tanner Lott	Riley Smith	Adam Flatt	Sean Flatt	Justin Twiss	Winnipeg, Manitoba
Elliott Mansell	Greg Johnson	Simon Jarrett	Sean Franey		Denver, Colorado
Carson McMullin	Daniel Laufer	Will Podhradsky	Ethan Macomber		Eau Claire, Wisconsin
David Mihm	Brycn Warring	Shane Nelson	Nolan Sigel		St. Paul, Minnesota
Benjamin Randall	Austin Carlson	Nathan van Eeckhout	Jacob Bortell		Madison, Wisconsin
Caiden Rose	Mason Guentzel	Ryan McCallum	Ryan Best	Adam Hein	Denver, Colorado
John Shuster	Andrew Stopera	Mark Fenner	Lance Wheeler		Duluth, Minnesota
Tyler Stewart	Jordan Potts	Jackson Dubinsky	Jamie Childs		Thunder Bay, Ontario
Stuart Strack	Miles Grabow	William Jordan	Wesley Henry		St. Paul, Minnesota
Jonah Traaseth	Matthew Robbins	Zachary Thompson	Elijah Traaseth	Jason Junge	Minneapolis, Minnesota
Samuel Strouse (Fourth)	Kevin Tuma (Skip)	Coleman Thurston	Connor Kauffman		Traverse City, Michigan

=== Round robin standings ===
Final Round Robin Standings

Key
Teams to Playoffs

Pool A	W	L	W–L	PF	PA
(Minnesota) Daniel Casper	4	0	–	27	7
(Minnesota) Stuart Strack	2	2	–	23	26
(Minnesota) David Mihm	1	3	–	11	21
(Minnesota) Aaron Carlson	0	4	–	12	29

Pool B	W	L	W–L	PF	PA
(Wisconsin) Caden Hebert	4	0	–	35	9
(Wisconsin) Austin Kadlec	2	2	–	20	19
(Wisconsin) Carson McMullin	1	3	–	26	24
(Minnesota) Jonah Traaseth	0	4	–	6	44

Pool C	W	L	W–L	PF	PA
(Minnesota) John Shuster	4	0	–	31	8
(Ontario) Jordan Chandler	3	1	–	23	15
(Ontario) Tyler Stewart	1	3	–	17	24
(Wisconsin) Benjamin Randall	0	4	–	9	32

Pool D	W	L	W–L	PF	PA
(North Dakota) Timothy Hodek	4	0	–	28	5
(Michigan) Kevin Tuma	3	1	–	25	18
(Manitoba) Zane Brandt	1	3	–	18	28
(Arizona) Bob Leclair	0	4	–	8	29

Pool E	W	L	W–L	PF	PA
(Manitoba) Jace Freeman	4	0	–	27	16
(Quebec) Félix Asselin	3	1	–	29	13
(Minnesota) Birgen Enberg	1	3	1–0	11	26
(California) Tucker Hellman	1	3	0–1	22	25

Pool F	W	L	W–L	PF	PA
(Pennsylvania) Scott Dunnam	3	1	–	26	13
(Colorado) Elliott Mansell	2	2	1–1	21	18
(Manitoba) Tanner Lott	2	2	1–1	16	22
(Colorado) Caiden Rose	2	2	1–1	17	17

=== Round robin results ===
All draw times are listed in Central Time Zone (UTC-06:00).

==== Draw 1 ====
Thursday, October 8, 8:00 am

Sheet 1	1	2	3	4	5	6	7	8	Final
(North Dakota) Timothy Hodek	0	1	2	0	2	1	1	X	7
(Manitoba) Zane Brandt 🔨	0	0	0	2	0	0	0	X	2

Sheet 2	1	2	3	4	5	6	7	8	Final
(Michigan) Kevin Tuma	0	3	1	0	5	X	X	X	9
(Arizona) Bob Leclair 🔨	1	0	0	1	0	X	X	X	2

Sheet 4	1	2	3	4	5	6	7	8	Final
(Quebec) Félix Asselin	0	1	1	0	3	0	2	X	7
(California) Tucker Hellman 🔨	1	0	0	1	0	1	0	X	3

Sheet 5	1	2	3	4	5	6	7	8	Final
(Minnesota) Daniel Casper 🔨	3	1	3	0	X	X	X	X	7
(Minnesota) Aaron Carlson	0	0	0	1	X	X	X	X	1

Sheet 7	1	2	3	4	5	6	7	8	Final
(Wisconsin) Benjamin Randall	0	0	0	X	X	X	X	X	0
(Ontario) Jordan Chandler 🔨	2	2	3	X	X	X	X	X	7

Sheet 8	1	2	3	4	5	6	7	8	Final
(Minnesota) Birgen Enberg	0	0	1	0	X	X	X	X	1
(Manitoba) Jace Freeman 🔨	0	3	0	4	X	X	X	X	7

==== Draw 2 ====
Thursday, October 8, 12:00 pm

Sheet 2	1	2	3	4	5	6	7	8	Final
(Minnesota) John Shuster	0	0	2	0	2	1	0	1	6
(Ontario) Tyler Stewart 🔨	1	1	0	1	0	0	2	0	5

Sheet 4	1	2	3	4	5	6	7	8	Final
(Minnesota) Jonah Traaseth	0	0	1	0	X	X	X	X	1
(Wisconsin) Carson McMullin 🔨	4	3	0	7	X	X	X	X	14

Sheet 5	1	2	3	4	5	6	7	8	Final
(Colorado) Caiden Rose	0	0	4	0	0	1	1	X	6
(Pennsylvania) Scott Dunnam 🔨	1	1	0	2	0	0	0	X	4

Sheet 7	1	2	3	4	5	6	7	8	Final
(Minnesota) David Mihm	0	0	1	1	0	1	0	X	3
(Minnesota) Stuart Strack 🔨	1	1	0	0	1	0	2	X	5

Sheet 8	1	2	3	4	5	6	7	8	Final
(Wisconsin) Caden Hebert 🔨	5	2	1	0	X	X	X	X	8
(Wisconsin) Austin Kadlec	0	0	0	1	X	X	X	X	1

==== Draw 3 ====
Thursday, October 8, 4:00 pm

Sheet 1	1	2	3	4	5	6	7	8	Final
(Manitoba) Tanner Lott	0	0	1	0	0	X	X	X	1
(Colorado) Elliott Mansell 🔨	2	2	0	3	1	X	X	X	8

Sheet 4	1	2	3	4	5	6	7	8	Final
(Michigan) Kevin Tuma	0	0	0	1	0	1	X	X	2
(North Dakota) Timothy Hodek 🔨	1	3	1	0	1	0	X	X	6

Sheet 5	1	2	3	4	5	6	7	8	Final
(Quebec) Félix Asselin 🔨	2	0	3	0	2	1	X	X	8
(Minnesota) Birgen Enberg	0	0	0	2	0	0	X	X	2

Sheet 6	1	2	3	4	5	6	7	8	Final
(Manitoba) Jace Freeman 🔨	2	0	1	0	4	0	0	1	8
(California) Tucker Hellman	0	2	0	2	0	2	1	0	7

Sheet 7	1	2	3	4	5	6	7	8	Final
(Manitoba) Zane Brandt 🔨	1	1	2	2	0	0	0	X	6
(Arizona) Bob Leclair	0	0	0	0	1	2	1	X	4

Sheet 8	1	2	3	4	5	6	7	8	Final
(Minnesota) John Shuster 🔨	4	4	2	1	X	X	X	X	11
(Wisconsin) Benjamin Randall	0	0	0	0	X	X	X	X	0

==== Draw 4 ====
Thursday, October 8, 8:00 pm

Sheet 1	1	2	3	4	5	6	7	8	Final
(Minnesota) Daniel Casper	1	1	1	2	3	X	X	X	8
(Minnesota) David Mihm 🔨	0	0	0	0	0	X	X	X	0

Sheet 6	1	2	3	4	5	6	7	8	Final
(Wisconsin) Caden Hebert 🔨	3	0	4	1	3	0	X	X	11
(Minnesota) Jonah Traaseth	0	2	0	0	0	1	X	X	3

==== Draw 5 ====
Friday, October 9, 8:00 am

Sheet 1	1	2	3	4	5	6	7	8	Final
(Ontario) Jordan Chandler 🔨	0	2	0	1	0	2	1	X	6
(Ontario) Tyler Stewart	0	0	1	0	2	0	0	X	3

Sheet 3	1	2	3	4	5	6	7	8	Final
(Minnesota) Aaron Carlson 🔨	0	0	0	1	0	X	X	X	1
(Pennsylvania) Scott Dunnam	1	2	1	0	3	X	X	X	7

Sheet 5	1	2	3	4	5	6	7	8	Final
(Manitoba) Tanner Lott	0	1	1	0	2	0	1	0	5
(Colorado) Caiden Rose 🔨	0	0	0	2	0	1	0	1	4

Sheet 8	1	2	3	4	5	6	7	8	Final
(Minnesota) Stuart Strack	1	0	1	0	0	2	0	0	4
(Colorado) Elliott Mansell 🔨	0	2	0	2	0	0	1	4	9

==== Draw 6 ====
Friday, October 9, 12:00 pm

Sheet 2	1	2	3	4	5	6	7	8	Final
(Wisconsin) Carson McMullin	0	0	2	1	0	1	0	X	4
(California) Tucker Hellman 🔨	2	1	0	0	2	0	3	X	8

Sheet 4	1	2	3	4	5	6	7	8	Final
(Wisconsin) Caden Hebert 🔨	2	1	0	0	2	2	X	X	7
(Minnesota) Birgen Enberg	0	0	1	1	0	0	X	X	2

Sheet 5	1	2	3	4	5	6	7	8	Final
(Wisconsin) Austin Kadlec 🔨	2	3	0	2	0	4	X	X	11
(Minnesota) Jonah Traaseth	0	0	1	0	1	0	X	X	2

Sheet 8	1	2	3	4	5	6	7	8	Final
(Michigan) Kevin Tuma	1	0	2	0	2	0	2	1	8
(Manitoba) Zane Brandt 🔨	0	2	0	2	0	2	0	0	6

==== Draw 7 ====
Friday, October 9, 4:00 pm

Sheet 3	1	2	3	4	5	6	7	8	Final
(Quebec) Félix Asselin 🔨	2	0	2	0	0	0	2	0	6
(Manitoba) Jace Freeman	0	1	0	2	2	2	0	1	8

Sheet 4	1	2	3	4	5	6	7	8	Final
(Minnesota) Daniel Casper	0	3	0	2	1	0	1	X	7
(Minnesota) Stuart Strack 🔨	1	0	2	0	0	1	0	X	4

Sheet 6	1	2	3	4	5	6	7	8	Final
(Ontario) Tyler Stewart 🔨	3	0	3	0	2	0	0	X	8
(Wisconsin) Benjamin Randall	0	1	0	1	0	2	1	X	5

Sheet 7	1	2	3	4	5	6	7	8	Final
(Colorado) Elliott Mansell 🔨	0	0	1	0	1	0	1	X	3
(Colorado) Caiden Rose	1	2	0	1	0	1	0	X	5

Sheet 8	1	2	3	4	5	6	7	8	Final
(Minnesota) John Shuster 🔨	2	0	3	3	X	X	X	X	8
(Ontario) Jordan Chandler	0	1	0	0	X	X	X	X	1

==== Draw 8 ====
Friday, October 9, 8:00 pm

Sheet 1	1	2	3	4	5	6	7	8	Final
(Wisconsin) Carson McMullin	2	0	0	1	1	0	1	0	5
(Wisconsin) Austin Kadlec 🔨	0	2	1	0	0	2	0	1	6

Sheet 4	1	2	3	4	5	6	7	8	Final
(Manitoba) Tanner Lott	0	1	0	1	0	2	0	1	5
(Pennsylvania) Scott Dunnam 🔨	1	0	1	0	2	0	3	0	7

Sheet 5	1	2	3	4	5	6	7	8	Final
(Minnesota) Aaron Carlson	2	0	0	0	0	0	1	0	3
(Minnesota) David Mihm 🔨	0	1	1	1	0	1	0	1	5

Sheet 8	1	2	3	4	5	6	7	8	Final
(Arizona) Bob Leclair 🔨	0	0	0	0	0	0	X	X	0
(North Dakota) Timothy Hodek	1	1	1	1	2	2	X	X	8

==== Draw 9 ====
Saturday, October 10, 8:00 am

Sheet 2	1	2	3	4	5	6	7	8	Final
(Wisconsin) Austin Kadlec	0	0	0	2	0	0	0	0	2
(Manitoba) Jace Freeman 🔨	0	1	1	0	1	0	0	1	4

Sheet 5	1	2	3	4	5	6	7	8	Final
(Wisconsin) Caden Hebert 🔨	5	0	0	0	4	X	X	X	9
(Wisconsin) Carson McMullin	0	2	1	0	0	X	X	X	3

Sheet 6	1	2	3	4	5	6	7	8	Final
(Minnesota) John Shuster 🔨	3	0	0	3	0	X	X	X	6
(Arizona) Bob Leclair	0	1	0	0	1	X	X	X	2

Sheet 8	1	2	3	4	5	6	7	8	Final
(Minnesota) Daniel Casper 🔨	2	1	1	0	1	0	X	X	5
(Colorado) Caiden Rose	0	0	0	1	0	1	X	X	2

==== Draw 10 ====
Saturday, October 10, 12:00 pm

Sheet 2	1	2	3	4	5	6	7	8	Final
(Minnesota) Jonah Traaseth	0	0	0	X	X	X	X	X	0
(Quebec) Félix Asselin 🔨	3	2	3	X	X	X	X	X	8

Sheet 3	1	2	3	4	5	6	7	8	Final
(Ontario) Jordan Chandler	1	0	6	0	0	0	2	X	9
(Manitoba) Zane Brandt 🔨	0	1	0	1	1	1	0	X	4

Sheet 6	1	2	3	4	5	6	7	8	Final
(Minnesota) David Mihm	0	1	0	0	1	0	1	X	3
(Manitoba) Tanner Lott 🔨	1	0	0	2	0	2	0	X	5

Sheet 7	1	2	3	4	5	6	7	8	Final
(Ontario) Tyler Stewart	0	0	1	0	0	X	X	X	1
(North Dakota) Timothy Hodek 🔨	2	1	0	0	4	X	X	X	7

==== Draw 11 ====
Saturday, October 10, 4:00 pm

Sheet 2	1	2	3	4	5	6	7	8	Final
(Pennsylvania) Scott Dunnam 🔨	0	1	0	1	1	0	5	X	8
(Colorado) Elliott Mansell	0	0	0	0	0	1	0	X	1

Sheet 3	1	2	3	4	5	6	7	8	Final
(Wisconsin) Benjamin Randall 🔨	0	3	0	0	0	1	0	X	4
(Michigan) Kevin Tuma	1	0	1	2	1	0	1	X	6

Sheet 4	1	2	3	4	5	6	7	8	Final
(Minnesota) Stuart Strack 🔨	2	0	0	1	3	0	0	4	10
(Minnesota) Aaron Carlson	0	2	1	0	0	2	2	0	7

Sheet 7	1	2	3	4	5	6	7	8	Final
(California) Tucker Hellman	0	1	1	0	0	0	2	0	4
(Minnesota) Birgen Enberg 🔨	1	0	0	2	1	1	0	1	6

=== Playoffs ===
Quarterfinals
1	(North Dakota) Timothy Hodek	7
8	(Michigan) Kevin Tuma	1
4	(Minnesota) John Shuster	5
5	(Minnesota) Daniel Casper	3
3	(Manitoba) Jace Freeman	8
6	(Pennsylvania) Scott Dunnam	7
2	(Wisconsin) Caden Hebert	6
7	(Quebec) Félix Asselin	7

Semifinals
1	(North Dakota) Timothy Hodek	1
4	(Minnesota) John Shuster	7
3	(Manitoba) Jace Freeman	8
7	(Quebec) Félix Asselin	6

Final
4	(Minnesota) John Shuster	5
3	(Manitoba) Jace Freeman	2

==== Quarterfinals ====
Saturday, October 10, 8:00 pm

Sheet 1	1	2	3	4	5	6	7	8	Final
(Manitoba) Jace Freeman 🔨	3	1	0	0	0	2	0	2	8
(Pennsylvania) Scott Dunnam	0	0	3	1	2	0	1	0	7

Sheet 3	1	2	3	4	5	6	7	8	Final
(Minnesota) John Shuster 🔨	0	1	0	1	0	0	3	X	5
(Minnesota) Daniel Casper	0	0	1	0	1	1	0	X	3

Sheet 5	1	2	3	4	5	6	7	8	Final
(North Dakota) Timothy Hodek 🔨	0	3	1	2	1	X	X	X	7
(Michigan) Kevin Tuma	1	0	0	0	0	X	X	X	1

Sheet 7	1	2	3	4	5	6	7	8	Final
(Wisconsin) Caden Hebert 🔨	1	2	0	0	1	0	2	0	6
(Quebec) Félix Asselin	0	0	2	2	0	2	0	1	7

==== Semifinals ====
Sunday, October 11, 10:00 am

Sheet 4	1	2	3	4	5	6	7	8	Final
(North Dakota) Timothy Hodek	0	0	1	0	X	X	X	X	1
(Minnesota) John Shuster 🔨	3	1	0	3	X	X	X	X	7

Sheet 6	1	2	3	4	5	6	7	8	Final
(Manitoba) Jace Freeman 🔨	3	0	1	0	1	0	0	3	8
(Quebec) Félix Asselin	0	2	0	1	0	2	1	0	6

==== Final ====
Sunday, October 11, 2:00 pm

Sheet 5	1	2	3	4	5	6	7	8	Final
(Minnesota) John Shuster 🔨	2	0	0	1	0	1	0	1	5
(Manitoba) Jace Freeman	0	0	1	0	0	0	1	0	2

== Women ==
=== Teams ===
The teams are listed as follows:

Skip	Third	Second	Lead	Locale
Nia Berg	Ella Willford	Solveig Berg	Carol Chance	Bemidji, Minnesota
Kate Cameron	Laurie St-Georges	Emily Riley	Émilia Gagné	Laval, Quebec
Elizabeth Cousins	Annmarie Dubberstein	Allison Howell	Elizabeth Janiak	Nashua, New Hampshire
Cora Farrell	Teagan Thurston	Claire Blaske	Abigail Page	Chaska, Minnesota
Satsuki Fujisawa	Yako Matsuzawa	Yumi Suzuki	Yurika Yoshida	Kitami, Japan
Serena Gray-Withers	Catherine Clifford	Laura Walker	Zoe Cinnamon	Edmonton, Alberta
Bella Hagenbuch	Addison Neill	Morgan Zacher	Megan Stopera	Minneapolis, Minnesota
Shaela Hayward	India Young	Keira Krahn	Dayna Wahl	Carman, Manitoba
Allory Johnson	Gianna Johnson	Morgan Zacher	Bailey Vaydich	Blaine, Minnesota
Christine MacKay	Laura Burtnyk	Emily Cherwinski	Sarah Pyke	Winnipeg, Manitoba
Lisa McLeod	Mikaylah Lyburn	Brooklyn Meiklejohn	Jolene Callum	Winnipeg, Manitoba
Christine McMakin	Sara Olson	Tessa Thurlow	Abigail Lin	Fargo, North Dakota
Anne O'Hara	Anya Normandeau	Sydney Mullaney	Ella Fleming	Chaska, Minnesota
Julia Pekowitz	Kalina Petrova	Lila Farwell	Alexa Pekowitz	Wayland, Massachusetts
Vicky Persinger	Lacy Simko	Liz Odell-Howe	Sarah Smith	Fairbanks, Alaska
Sere Politano	Amber Will	Leena Hornlein	Jackie Sharp	Laurel, Maryland
Kim Rhyme	Stephanie Senneker	Libby Brundage	Clare Moores	Minneapolis, Minnesota
Julie Segovia	Alyssa Parks	Emily Schweitzer	Meghan Taylor	Houston, Texas
Karina Treynor	Alice Mihm	Scarlett Wilson	Aanya Goenka	Oakland, California
Rhonda Varnes	Grace Beaudry	Emily Ostrowsky	Kylie Lippens	Winnipeg, Manitoba

=== Round robin standings ===
Final Round Robin Standings

Key
Teams to Playoffs

Pool A	W	L	W–L	PF	PA
(Japan) Satsuki Fujisawa	4	0	–	29	12
(Minnesota) Allory Johnson	3	1	–	24	18
(Manitoba) Shaela Hayward	2	2	–	23	23
(Texas) Julie Segovia	1	3	–	17	22
(California) Karina Treynor	0	4	–	10	28

Pool B	W	L	W–L	PF	PA
(Alberta) Serena Gray-Withers	3	1	1–0	24	20
(Minnesota) Anne O'Hara	3	1	0–1	31	14
(Minnesota) Nia Berg	2	2	–	21	30
(Alaska) Vicky Persinger	1	3	1–0	16	28
(Manitoba) Lisa McLeod	1	3	0–1	23	23

Pool C	W	L	W–L	PF	PA
(North Dakota) Christine McMakin	3	1	1–0	20	18
(Minnesota) Cora Farrell	3	1	0–1	35	26
(Manitoba) Rhonda Varnes	2	2	–	28	24
(Manitoba) Christine MacKay	1	3	1–0	12	24
(Quebec) Kate Cameron	1	3	0–1	25	28

Pool D	W	L	W–L	PF	PA
(Minnesota) Bella Hagenbuch	3	1	1–0	24	20
(Massachusetts) Julia Pekowitz	3	1	0–1	27	23
(New Hampshire) Elizabeth Cousins	2	2	1–0	24	21
(Minnesota) Kim Rhyme	2	2	0–1	26	24
(Maryland) Sere Politano	0	4	–	15	28

=== Round robin results ===
All draw times are listed in Central Time Zone (UTC-06:00).

==== Draw 1 ====
Thursday, October 8, 8:00 am

Sheet 3	1	2	3	4	5	6	7	8	Final
(Quebec) Kate Cameron	0	1	3	0	1	1	0	2	8
(Manitoba) Rhonda Varnes 🔨	0	0	0	3	0	0	4	0	7

Sheet 6	1	2	3	4	5	6	7	8	Final
(Minnesota) Nia Berg 🔨	0	1	0	0	0	1	X	X	2
(Minnesota) Anne O'Hara	0	0	1	5	2	0	X	X	8

==== Draw 2 ====
Thursday, October 8, 12:00 pm

Sheet 1	1	2	3	4	5	6	7	8	Final
(North Dakota) Christine McMakin	0	0	2	2	2	X	X	X	6
(Manitoba) Christine MacKay 🔨	0	1	0	0	0	X	X	X	1

Sheet 3	1	2	3	4	5	6	7	8	Final
(Massachusetts) Julia Pekowitz 🔨	2	0	3	3	1	0	1	3	13
(Minnesota) Kim Rhyme	0	2	0	0	0	5	0	0	7

Sheet 6	1	2	3	4	5	6	7	8	Final
(Manitoba) Shaela Hayward 🔨	2	0	1	1	0	1	1	X	6
(California) Karina Treynor	0	2	0	0	2	0	0	X	4

==== Draw 3 ====
Thursday, October 8, 4:00 pm

Sheet 2	1	2	3	4	5	6	7	8	Final
(Japan) Satsuki Fujisawa 🔨	2	0	0	1	1	0	3	X	7
(Minnesota) Allory Johnson	0	1	1	0	0	1	0	X	3

Sheet 3	1	2	3	4	5	6	7	8	Final
(Alberta) Serena Gray-Withers	0	1	0	4	3	0	2	X	10
(Minnesota) Nia Berg 🔨	1	0	1	0	0	2	0	X	4

==== Draw 4 ====
Thursday, October 8, 8:00 pm

Sheet 2	1	2	3	4	5	6	7	8	Final
(New Hampshire) Elizabeth Cousins 🔨	2	0	0	1	0	1	2	0	6
(Minnesota) Bella Hagenbuch	0	2	1	0	3	0	0	1	7

Sheet 3	1	2	3	4	5	6	7	8	Final
(Manitoba) Christine MacKay 🔨	0	1	0	0	X	X	X	X	1
(Minnesota) Cora Farrell	1	0	3	5	X	X	X	X	9

Sheet 4	1	2	3	4	5	6	7	8	Final
(Quebec) Kate Cameron	0	0	0	0	1	2	1	0	4
(North Dakota) Christine McMakin 🔨	0	1	1	1	0	0	0	2	5

Sheet 5	1	2	3	4	5	6	7	8	Final
(Minnesota) Kim Rhyme 🔨	0	2	0	0	2	1	0	2	7
(Maryland) Sere Politano	0	0	2	1	0	0	1	0	4

Sheet 7	1	2	3	4	5	6	7	8	Final
(Alaska) Vicky Persinger 🔨	1	2	1	0	0	2	0	1	7
(Manitoba) Lisa McLeod	0	0	0	2	2	0	1	0	5

Sheet 8	1	2	3	4	5	6	7	8	Final
(Texas) Julie Segovia 🔨	2	0	0	0	0	0	0	X	2
(Manitoba) Shaela Hayward	0	2	1	0	0	2	2	X	7

==== Draw 5 ====
Friday, October 9, 8:00 am

Sheet 2	1	2	3	4	5	6	7	8	Final
(Alberta) Serena Gray-Withers 🔨	0	2	1	0	3	X	X	X	6
(Alaska) Vicky Persinger	0	0	0	1	0	X	X	X	1

Sheet 4	1	2	3	4	5	6	7	8	Final
(Minnesota) Bella Hagenbuch 🔨	0	1	0	3	3	3	X	X	10
(Massachusetts) Julia Pekowitz	0	0	1	0	0	0	X	X	1

Sheet 6	1	2	3	4	5	6	7	8	Final
(Minnesota) Anne O'Hara	1	0	4	0	0	2	2	X	9
(Manitoba) Lisa McLeod 🔨	0	2	0	2	1	0	0	X	5

Sheet 7	1	2	3	4	5	6	7	8	Final
(California) Karina Treynor	0	0	0	0	0	2	1	X	3
(Minnesota) Allory Johnson 🔨	2	0	1	1	2	0	0	X	6

==== Draw 6 ====
Friday, October 9, 12:00 pm

Sheet 1	1	2	3	4	5	6	7	8	Final
(Japan) Satsuki Fujisawa 🔨	3	0	0	2	3	0	0	X	8
(Manitoba) Shaela Hayward	0	2	1	0	0	1	1	X	5

Sheet 3	1	2	3	4	5	6	7	8	Final
(New Hampshire) Elizabeth Cousins	0	5	2	0	3	X	X	X	10
(Maryland) Sere Politano 🔨	0	0	0	2	0	X	X	X	2

Sheet 6	1	2	3	4	5	6	7	8	Final
(Manitoba) Rhonda Varnes	0	0	1	1	0	2	1	2	7
(North Dakota) Christine McMakin 🔨	0	1	0	0	1	0	0	0	2

Sheet 7	1	2	3	4	5	6	7	8	9	Final
(Quebec) Kate Cameron	2	0	1	1	0	5	0	0	0	9
(Minnesota) Cora Farrell 🔨	0	3	0	0	3	0	2	1	1	10

==== Draw 7 ====
Friday, October 9, 4:00 pm

Sheet 1	1	2	3	4	5	6	7	8	Final
(Minnesota) Allory Johnson 🔨	1	0	0	1	0	2	2	X	6
(Texas) Julie Segovia	0	1	1	0	1	0	0	X	3

Sheet 2	1	2	3	4	5	6	7	8	Final
(Alberta) Serena Gray-Withers	0	1	0	0	2	0	3	1	7
(Minnesota) Anne O'Hara 🔨	2	0	1	1	0	2	0	0	6

Sheet 5	1	2	3	4	5	6	7	8	Final
(Manitoba) Lisa McLeod	1	0	1	0	0	0	2	0	4
(Minnesota) Nia Berg 🔨	0	1	0	1	0	2	0	2	6

==== Draw 8 ====
Friday, October 9, 8:00 pm

Sheet 2	1	2	3	4	5	6	7	8	Final
(Manitoba) Christine MacKay	0	0	2	0	0	0	2	0	4
(Manitoba) Rhonda Varnes 🔨	0	0	0	2	1	1	0	1	5

Sheet 3	1	2	3	4	5	6	7	8	Final
(Japan) Satsuki Fujisawa 🔨	1	0	2	1	1	1	1	X	7
(California) Karina Treynor	0	1	0	0	0	0	0	X	1

Sheet 6	1	2	3	4	5	6	7	8	Final
(Minnesota) Kim Rhyme 🔨	1	3	1	1	0	2	X	X	8
(Minnesota) Bella Hagenbuch	0	0	0	0	1	0	X	X	1

Sheet 7	1	2	3	4	5	6	7	8	Final
(New Hampshire) Elizabeth Cousins	0	0	1	0	1	0	X	X	2
(Massachusetts) Julia Pekowitz 🔨	1	2	0	1	0	4	X	X	8

==== Draw 9 ====
Saturday, October 10, 8:00 am

Sheet 1	1	2	3	4	5	6	7	8	9	Final
(Massachusetts) Julia Pekowitz 🔨	2	0	0	1	0	0	1	0	1	5
(Maryland) Sere Politano	0	0	0	0	2	1	0	1	0	4

Sheet 3	1	2	3	4	5	6	7	8	Final
(North Dakota) Christine McMakin 🔨	1	0	0	1	1	0	0	4	7
(Minnesota) Cora Farrell	0	2	1	0	0	2	1	0	6

Sheet 4	1	2	3	4	5	6	7	8	Final
(Minnesota) Nia Berg 🔨	0	1	0	2	0	0	2	4	9
(Alaska) Vicky Persinger	0	0	3	0	2	3	0	0	8

Sheet 7	1	2	3	4	5	6	7	8	Final
(Japan) Satsuki Fujisawa	0	2	1	0	1	1	2	X	7
(Texas) Julie Segovia 🔨	1	0	0	2	0	0	0	X	3

==== Draw 10 ====
Saturday, October 10, 12:00 pm

Sheet 1	1	2	3	4	5	6	7	8	Final
(Alberta) Serena Gray-Withers 🔨	0	0	0	1	0	X	X	X	1
(Manitoba) Lisa McLeod	1	3	2	0	3	X	X	X	9

Sheet 4	1	2	3	4	5	6	7	8	9	Final
(New Hampshire) Elizabeth Cousins 🔨	0	0	0	1	0	1	2	0	2	6
(Minnesota) Kim Rhyme	0	1	1	0	1	0	0	1	0	4

Sheet 5	1	2	3	4	5	6	7	8	Final
(Minnesota) Allory Johnson	0	3	2	0	3	0	1	X	9
(Manitoba) Shaela Hayward 🔨	1	0	0	3	0	1	0	X	5

Sheet 8	1	2	3	4	5	6	7	8	Final
(Quebec) Kate Cameron	2	0	0	0	2	0	0	X	4
(Manitoba) Christine MacKay 🔨	0	0	3	1	0	1	1	X	6

==== Draw 11 ====
Saturday, October 10, 4:00 pm

Sheet 1	1	2	3	4	5	6	7	8	Final
(Minnesota) Anne O'Hara 🔨	0	6	2	X	X	X	X	X	8
(Alaska) Vicky Persinger	0	0	0	X	X	X	X	X	0

Sheet 5	1	2	3	4	5	6	7	8	9	Final
(Maryland) Sere Politano 🔨	0	1	0	1	0	0	3	0	0	5
(Minnesota) Bella Hagenbuch	0	0	1	0	2	1	0	1	1	6

Sheet 6	1	2	3	4	5	6	7	8	9	Final
(Minnesota) Cora Farrell	0	0	0	4	0	0	4	1	1	10
(Manitoba) Rhonda Varnes 🔨	0	2	3	0	2	1	0	0	0	9

Sheet 8	1	2	3	4	5	6	7	8	Final
(California) Karina Treynor	0	0	0	1	1	0	X	X	2
(Texas) Julie Segovia 🔨	0	5	1	0	0	3	X	X	9

=== Playoffs ===
Quarterfinals
1	(Japan) Satsuki Fujisawa	7
8	(Minnesota) Cora Farrell	4
4	(Massachusetts) Julia Pekowitz	1
5	(Alberta) Serena Gray-Withers	6
3	(Minnesota) Bella Hagenbuch	2
6	(Minnesota) Anne O'Hara	8
2	(North Dakota) Christine McMakin	6
7	(Minnesota) Allory Johnson	3

Semifinals
1	(Japan) Satsuki Fujisawa	5
5	(Alberta) Serena Gray-Withers	2
6	(Minnesota) Anne O'Hara	9
2	(North Dakota) Christine McMakin	4

Final
1	(Japan) Satsuki Fujisawa	4
6	(Minnesota) Anne O'Hara	6

==== Quarterfinals ====
Saturday, October 10, 8:00 pm

Sheet 2	1	2	3	4	5	6	7	8	Final
(North Dakota) Christine McMakin 🔨	0	1	0	3	0	2	0	X	6
(Minnesota) Allory Johnson	0	0	1	0	1	0	1	X	3

Sheet 4	1	2	3	4	5	6	7	8	Final
(Japan) Satsuki Fujisawa 🔨	2	0	0	3	0	2	0	X	7
(Minnesota) Cora Farrell	0	1	0	0	1	0	2	X	4

Sheet 6	1	2	3	4	5	6	7	8	Final
(Massachusetts) Julia Pekowitz	0	0	1	0	0	0	X	X	1
(Alberta) Serena Gray-Withers 🔨	1	1	0	1	2	1	X	X	6

Sheet 8	1	2	3	4	5	6	7	8	Final
(Minnesota) Bella Hagenbuch	0	1	1	0	0	0	X	X	2
(Minnesota) Anne O'Hara 🔨	3	0	0	2	1	2	X	X	8

==== Semifinals ====
Sunday, October 11, 10:00 am

Sheet 3	1	2	3	4	5	6	7	8	Final
(Japan) Satsuki Fujisawa 🔨	2	0	1	0	1	0	1	X	5
(Alberta) Serena Gray-Withers	0	0	0	1	0	1	0	X	2

Sheet 5	1	2	3	4	5	6	7	8	Final
(Minnesota) Anne O'Hara	1	1	0	3	0	0	4	X	9
(North Dakota) Christine McMakin 🔨	0	0	2	0	1	1	0	X	4

==== Final ====
Sunday, October 11, 2:00 pm

Sheet 4	1	2	3	4	5	6	7	8	Final
(Japan) Satsuki Fujisawa 🔨	0	1	0	0	2	0	1	0	4
(Minnesota) Anne O'Hara	0	0	0	2	0	2	0	2	6
