= St. Paul Cash Spiel =

World Curling Tour event

St. Paul Cashspiel
- Established: 1994
- Host city: St. Paul, Minnesota
- Arena: St. Paul Curling Club
- Men's purse: $25,000
- Women's purse: $20,700

Current champions (2026)
- Men: (Minnesota) John Shuster
- Women: (Minnesota) Anne O'Hara

Current edition
- 2026 St. Paul Cashspiel

The St. Paul Cash Spiel is an annual bonspiel, or curling tournament, that takes place at the St. Paul Curling Club in St. Paul, Minnesota, United States. It is part of the World Curling Tour. The bonspiel takes place during the 6th/7th week of the Tour. In the past, the event has been held using a triple knockout format, but a round-robin tournament format has been used since the 2010 spiel. The men's tournament was started in 1994 and has been held every year since 1998 as part of the World Curling Tour. The first edition of the women's tournament began in 2011.

== Past champions ==
Only skip's name is displayed.

=== Men ===
Year	Winning team	Runner up team	Purse (USD)
1994	(Wisconsin) Steve Brown	(Illinois) Greg Gallagher	$2,000
1998	(Ontario) Bruce Melville	(Minnesota) Paul Pustovar	
1999	(Minnesota) Tim Somerville	(Minnesota) John Medure	
2000	(Wisconsin) Craig Brown	(Manitoba) David Bohn	
2001	(Minnesota) Paul Pustovar	(Wisconsin) Craig Brown	
2002	(Manitoba) Dave Smith	(Ontario) Ed Premo	
2003	(Minnesota) Paul Pustovar	(Minnesota) Mark Haluptzok	$15,600
2004	(Manitoba) Howard Restall	(Wisconsin) Craig Brown	$16,000
2005	(Minnesota) Paul Pustovar	(Minnesota) Rich Ruohonen	$14,400
2006	(Ontario) Bryan Burgess	(North Dakota) Craig Disher	$14,400
2007	(North Dakota) Craig Disher	(Ontario) Trevor Clifford	$16,000
2008	(Minnesota) Pete Fenson	(Ontario) Bryan Burgess	$16,200
2009	(Ontario) Mike Pozihun	(Ontario) Bryan Burgess	$12,000
2010	(Minnesota) Tyler George	(Ontario) Bryan Burgess	$13,500
2011	(Minnesota) Tyler George	(Ontario) Jeff Currie	$13,500
2012	(Minnesota) John Shuster	(Minnesota) Todd Birr	$16,000
2013	(Manitoba) Scott Ramsay	(Minnesota) Tyler George	$16,000
2014	(Minnesota) Mike Farbelow	(Minnesota) Korey Dropkin	$16,000
2015	(Minnesota) Todd Birr	(New York (state)) Heath McCormick	$12,000
2016	(Minnesota) Heath McCormick	(Minnesota) Kroy Nernberger	$12,400
2017	(Minnesota) Heath McCormick	(Minnesota) Sean Murray	$12,400
2018	(Minnesota) Andrew Stopera	(Minnesota) Mark Fenner	$12,000
2019	(Minnesota) Rich Ruohonen	(Minnesota) Todd Birr	$12,000
2020–2022	Cancelled		
2023	(Minnesota) Daniel Casper	(Minnesota) Rich Ruohonen	$15,000
2024	(Minnesota) Daniel Casper	(Pennsylvania) Scott Dunnam	$20,000
2025	(Wisconsin) Caden Hebert	(Pennsylvania) Scott Dunnam	$25,000
2026	(Minnesota) John Shuster	(Manitoba) Jace Freeman	$25,000

=== Women ===
Year	Winning team	Runner up team	Purse (USD)
2011	(New York (state)) Patti Lank	(Minnesota) Aileen Sormunen	$7,200
2012	(New York (state)) Patti Lank	(Minnesota) Margie Smith	$7,200
2013	(Manitoba) Michelle Montford	(Minnesota) Alexandra Carlson	$7,200
2014	(Minnesota) Aileen Sormunen	(Wisconsin) Debbie McCormick	$7,200
2015	(Minnesota) Cory Christensen	(Minnesota) Jamie Sinclair	$6,000
2016	(Minnesota) Cory Christensen	(Wisconsin) Nina Roth	$6,450
2017	(Minnesota) Jessica Schultz	(Minnesota) Cora Farrell	
2018	(Minnesota) Annmarie Duberstein	(Minnesota) Allison Pottinger	$6,000
2019	(Minnesota) Cora Farrell	(Minnesota) Kim Rhyme	$6,000
2020–2022	Cancelled		
2023	(Alaska) Ariel Traxler	(Minnesota) Allory Johnson	$16,000
2024	(Minnesota) Courtney Benson	(New Hampshire) Elizabeth Cousins	$20,000
2025	(South Korea) Kim Eun-jung	(Michigan) Delaney Strouse	$25,000
2026	(Minnesota) Anne O'Hara	(Japan) Satsuki Fujisawa	$20,700
