= 2026 GSOC National =

Grand Slam of Curling event

2026 HearingLife National
- Host city: Sydney, Nova Scotia
- Arena: Centre 200
- Dates: November 17–22
- Women's winner: (Switzerland) Team Pätz
- Curling club: CC3C, Geneva, Switzerland
- Skip: Alina Pätz
- Third: Selina Witschonke
- Second: Stefanie Berset
- Lead: Renée Frigo
- Finalist: (Japan) Miku Nihira

The 2026 HearingLife National is currently being held from November 17 to 22 at Centre 200 in Sydney, Nova Scotia. It is the third Grand Slam event of the 2026–27 curling season.

== Qualification ==
The top 12 ranked men's and women's teams on the World Curling Federation's world team rankings as of October 20, 2026, qualified for the event. In the event that a team declines their invitation, the next-ranked team on the world team ranking is invited until the twelve spots have been filled. The next two spots were given out to two sponsor's exemptions, while the remaining two spots were given out to winners of two GSOC satellite events. In the event that the winning team was already qualified, the next highest finishing team at the event was invited until the spot was filled.

=== Men ===
Means of Qualification	Vacancies	Qualified
World Rankings	12	(Switzerland) Yannick Schwaller (Scotland) Grant Hardie (Manitoba) Matt Dunstone (Alberta) Brad Jacobs (Scotland) Bruce Mouat (United States) Daniel Casper (Sweden) Oskar Eriksson (Switzerland) Marco Hösli (Alberta) Brendan Bottcher (Manitoba) John Epping (Italy) Stefano Spiller (Japan) Tsuyoshi Yamaguchi
Sponsor's Exemptions	2	(Manitoba) Jordon McDonald (Scotland) Kyle Waddell
St. Paul Cashspiel	1	(United States) John Shuster
Stu Sells 1824 Halifax Classic	1	(Japan) Takumi Maeda
TOTAL	16	

=== Women ===
Means of Qualification	Vacancies	Qualified
World Rankings	12	(South Korea) Gim Eun-ji (Manitoba) Kerri Einarson (Switzerland) Xenia Schwaller (Ontario) Rachel Homan (Switzerland) Alina Pätz (Sweden) Anna Hasselborg (Japan) Miku Nihira (Sweden) Isabella Wranå (South Korea) Kim Kyeong-ae (South Korea) Park You-been (Japan) Satsuki Fujisawa (Japan) Mina Kobayashi
Sponsor's Exemptions	2	(Nova Scotia) Christina Black (Alberta) Selena Sturmay
St. Paul Cashspiel	1	(United States) Anne O'Hara
Stu Sells 1824 Halifax Classic	1	(Japan) Ikue Kitazawa
TOTAL	16	

== Men ==
=== Teams ===
The teams are listed as follows:

Skip	Third	Second	Lead	Alternate	Locale
Brendan Bottcher	Jake Horgan	Tanner Horgan	Geoff Walker		Edmonton, Alberta
Daniel Casper	Luc Violette	Ben Richardson	Aidan Oldenburg		(United States) Chaska, Minnesota
Matt Dunstone	Colton Lott	Korey Dropkin (Note: Korey Dropkin spared for Mark Nichols who was recovering from an injury.)	Ryan Harnden		Winnipeg, Manitoba
John Epping	B. J. Neufeld	Ryan Wiebe	Ian McMillan		Winnipeg, Manitoba
Oskar Eriksson	Rasmus Wranå	Simon Olofsson	Christoffer Sundgren		Karlstad, Sweden
Ross Whyte (Fourth)	Grant Hardie (Skip)	Craig Waddell	Euan Kyle		Stirling, Scotland
Philipp Hösli (Fourth)	Marco Hösli (Skip)	Simon Gloor	Justin Hausherr		Glarus, Switzerland
Brad Jacobs	Marc Kennedy	Brett Gallant	Ben Hebert		Calgary, Alberta
Takumi Maeda	Hiroki Maeda	Uryu Kamikawa	Gakuto Tokoro	Ryotaro Shukuya	Tokoro, Japan
Jordon McDonald	Jacques Gauthier	Elias Huminicki	Cameron Olafson		Winnipeg, Manitoba
Bruce Mouat	Robin Brydone	Bobby Lammie	Hammy McMillan Jr.		Stirling, Scotland
Benoît Schwarz-van Berkel (Fourth)	Yannick Schwaller (Skip)	Sven Michel	Pablo Lachat-Couchepin		Geneva, Switzerland
John Shuster	Andrew Stopera	Mark Fenner	Lance Wheeler		(United States) Duluth, Minnesota
Stefano Spiller	Amos Mosaner	Sebastiano Arman	Cesare Spiller	Giacomo Colli (Note: Giacomo Colli spared for Cesare Spiller in Team Spiller's first and second games.)	Trentino, Italy
Kyle Waddell	Mark Watt	Duncan McFadzean (Note: Duncan McFadzean spared for Angus Bryce who was recovering from an injury.)	Blair Haswell		Hamilton, Scotland
Riku Yanagisawa (Fourth)	Tsuyoshi Yamaguchi (Skip)	Takeru Yamamoto	Satoshi Koizumi		Karuizawa, Japan

=== Round robin standings ===
Final Round Robin Standings

Key
Teams to Playoffs

Pool A	W	SOW	SOL	L	PF	PA	Pts	LSD
(Switzerland) Yannick Schwaller	4	0	0	0	32	16	12	38.70
(Alberta) Brendan Bottcher	1	0	0	3	22	28	3	4.20
(Switzerland) Marco Hösli	1	0	0	3	20	31	3	32.90
(Japan) Takumi Maeda	1	0	0	3	24	29	3	127.20

Pool B	W	SOW	SOL	L	PF	PA	Pts	LSD
(Sweden) Oskar Eriksson	2	1	1	0	26	20	9	25.60
(Scotland) Grant Hardie	2	0	0	2	20	19	6	80.00
(Manitoba) John Epping	1	1	0	2	23	23	5	19.90
(United States) John Shuster	1	0	1	2	16	22	3	24.80

Pool C	W	SOW	SOL	L	PF	PA	Pts	LSD
(Italy) Stefano Spiller	3	0	0	1	18	21	9	12.60
(Manitoba) Matt Dunstone	3	0	0	1	28	13	9	20.40
(United States) Daniel Casper	2	0	0	2	27	21	6	58.60
(Scotland) Kyle Waddell	0	0	0	4	16	35	0	89.80

Pool D	W	SOW	SOL	L	PF	PA	Pts	LSD
(Alberta) Brad Jacobs	3	1	0	0	26	13	11	42.30
(Scotland) Bruce Mouat	3	0	0	1	23	16	9	20.00
(Manitoba) Jordon McDonald	1	0	1	2	21	29	3	33.80
(Japan) Tsuyoshi Yamaguchi	0	1	1	2	21	27	2	110.20

=== Round robin results ===
All draw times are listed in Atlantic Time (UTC−04:00).

==== Draw 1 ====
Tuesday, November 17, 8:30 am

Sheet A	1	2	3	4	5	6	7	8	Final
(Switzerland) Yannick Schwaller 🔨	2	0	2	1	0	2	0	0	7
(Japan) Takumi Maeda	0	2	0	0	1	0	2	1	6

Sheet C	1	2	3	4	5	6	7	8	Final
(Scotland) Grant Hardie	1	0	1	0	0	1	0	X	3
(Sweden) Oskar Eriksson 🔨	0	1	0	2	3	0	1	X	7

==== Draw 2 ====
Tuesday, November 17, 12:00 pm

Sheet A	1	2	3	4	5	6	7	8	Final
(Switzerland) Marco Hösli	0	2	0	2	0	0	3	X	7
(Alberta) Brendan Bottcher 🔨	2	0	1	0	0	1	0	X	4

Sheet B	1	2	3	4	5	6	7	8	Final
(United States) Daniel Casper 🔨	3	0	2	3	0	4	X	X	12
(Scotland) Kyle Waddell	0	1	0	0	2	0	X	X	3

==== Draw 3 ====
Tuesday, November 17, 4:00 pm

Sheet A	1	2	3	4	5	6	7	8	Final
(Alberta) Brad Jacobs	4	0	1	0	2	2	X	X	9
(Manitoba) Jordon McDonald 🔨	0	1	0	1	0	0	X	X	2

Sheet B	1	2	3	4	5	6	7	8	Final
(Manitoba) Matt Dunstone	0	1	0	0	1	0	1	0	3
(Italy) Stefano Spiller 🔨	1	0	0	1	0	1	0	1	4

==== Draw 4 ====
Tuesday, November 17, 8:00 pm

Sheet A	1	2	3	4	5	6	7	8	Final
(Scotland) Bruce Mouat 🔨	1	0	2	0	1	0	0	3	7
(Japan) Tsuyoshi Yamaguchi	0	1	0	3	0	1	0	0	5

Sheet C	1	2	3	4	5	6	7	8	Final
(Manitoba) John Epping	2	0	2	1	0	3	X	X	8
(United States) John Shuster 🔨	0	1	0	0	1	0	X	X	2

==== Draw 5 ====
Wednesday, November 18, 8:30 am

Sheet C	1	2	3	4	5	6	7	8	Final
(Switzerland) Marco Hösli 🔨	0	1	0	1	0	3	0	0	5
(Japan) Takumi Maeda	2	0	2	0	1	0	2	1	8

Sheet D	1	2	3	4	5	6	7	8	Final
(United States) Daniel Casper	0	2	0	3	1	1	2	X	9
(Italy) Stefano Spiller 🔨	2	0	1	0	0	0	0	X	3

==== Draw 6 ====
Wednesday, November 18, 12:00 pm

Sheet C	1	2	3	4	5	6	7	8	Final
(Switzerland) Yannick Schwaller 🔨	3	2	0	1	0	0	3	X	9
(Alberta) Brendan Bottcher	0	0	2	0	2	1	0	X	5

Sheet D	1	2	3	4	5	6	7	8	Final
(Manitoba) Matt Dunstone 🔨	2	2	1	2	0	1	2	X	10
(Scotland) Kyle Waddell	0	0	0	0	3	0	0	X	3

==== Draw 7 ====
Wednesday, November 18, 4:00 pm

Sheet C	1	2	3	4	5	6	7	8	9	Final
(Japan) Tsuyoshi Yamaguchi	0	2	0	0	0	3	1	0	1	7
(Manitoba) Jordon McDonald 🔨	1	0	2	1	1	0	0	1	0	6

Sheet D	1	2	3	4	5	6	7	8	Final
(Scotland) Grant Hardie 🔨	3	0	0	1	0	1	0	1	6
(Manitoba) John Epping	0	0	3	0	1	0	1	0	5

==== Draw 8 ====
Wednesday, November 18, 8:00 pm

Sheet C	1	2	3	4	5	6	7	8	Final
(Alberta) Brad Jacobs 🔨	0	1	1	0	1	0	2	X	5
(Scotland) Bruce Mouat	1	0	0	1	0	1	0	X	3

Sheet D	1	2	3	4	5	6	7	8	9	Final
(Sweden) Oskar Eriksson	1	0	1	0	1	0	1	0	1	5
(United States) John Shuster 🔨	0	1	0	1	0	1	0	1	0	4

==== Draw 9 ====
Thursday, November 19, 8:00 am

Sheet A	1	2	3	4	5	6	7	8	Final
(Switzerland) Marco Hösli	0	2	0	1	1	0	3	0	7
(Manitoba) Jordon McDonald 🔨	3	0	3	0	0	1	0	4	11

Sheet C	1	2	3	4	5	6	7	8	Final
(Italy) Stefano Spiller 🔨	4	0	0	1	0	0	0	1	6
(Scotland) Kyle Waddell	0	1	1	0	0	2	1	0	5

==== Draw 10 ====
Thursday, November 19, 11:30 am

Sheet A	1	2	3	4	5	6	7	8	Final
(Scotland) Bruce Mouat 🔨	1	0	3	0	3	0	0	X	7
(Japan) Takumi Maeda	0	1	0	1	0	0	2	X	4

==== Draw 11 ====
Thursday, November 19, 3:30 pm

Sheet A	1	2	3	4	5	6	7	8	Final
(Scotland) Grant Hardie	0	2	2	0	1	1	1	X	7
(United States) John Shuster 🔨	1	0	0	1	0	0	0	X	2

Sheet B	1	2	3	4	5	6	7	8	Final
(Manitoba) Matt Dunstone	0	2	0	2	2	0	0	1	7
(United States) Daniel Casper 🔨	1	0	1	0	0	0	2	0	4

==== Draw 12 ====
Thursday, November 19, 7:30 pm

Sheet A	1	2	3	4	5	6	7	8	Final
(Switzerland) Yannick Schwaller	0	2	0	2	0	1	0	3	8
(Japan) Tsuyoshi Yamaguchi 🔨	1	0	1	0	1	0	1	0	4

Sheet C	1	2	3	4	5	6	7	8	9	Final
(Sweden) Oskar Eriksson 🔨	2	0	2	0	1	0	2	0	0	7
(Manitoba) John Epping	0	2	0	1	0	2	0	2	1	8

Sheet D	1	2	3	4	5	6	7	8	Final
(Alberta) Brad Jacobs 🔨	0	2	0	2	1	0	1	X	6
(Alberta) Brendan Bottcher	1	0	1	0	0	1	0	X	3

==== Draw 13 ====
Friday, November 20, 8:30 am

Sheet D	1	2	3	4	5	6	7	8	Final
(Scotland) Grant Hardie	0	0	0	0	1	0	3	0	4
(Italy) Stefano Spiller 🔨	0	1	0	1	0	1	0	2	5

==== Draw 14 ====
Friday, November 20, 12:00 pm

Sheet A	1	2	3	4	5	6	7	8	Final
(Manitoba) Matt Dunstone	0	2	0	3	2	1	X	X	8
(Manitoba) John Epping 🔨	1	0	1	0	0	0	X	X	2

Sheet B	1	2	3	4	5	6	7	8	Final
(Alberta) Brendan Bottcher	0	3	1	0	0	3	0	3	10
(Japan) Takumi Maeda 🔨	2	0	0	1	1	0	2	0	6

Sheet D	1	2	3	4	5	6	7	8	Final
(Switzerland) Yannick Schwaller 🔨	1	0	2	2	3	X	X	X	8
(Switzerland) Marco Hösli	0	1	0	0	0	X	X	X	1

==== Draw 15 ====
Friday, November 20, 4:00 pm

Sheet B	1	2	3	4	5	6	7	8	Final
(Scotland) Bruce Mouat 🔨	1	0	3	2	0	0	X	X	6
(Manitoba) Jordon McDonald	0	1	0	0	0	1	X	X	2

Sheet C	1	2	3	4	5	6	7	8	Final
(United States) Daniel Casper	1	0	0	1	0	X	X	X	2
(United States) John Shuster 🔨	0	2	0	0	6	X	X	X	8

==== Draw 16 ====
Friday, November 20, 8:00 pm

Sheet A	1	2	3	4	5	6	7	8	Final
(Scotland) Kyle Waddell	1	1	0	1	0	2	0	0	5
(Sweden) Oskar Eriksson 🔨	0	0	1	0	3	0	2	1	7

Sheet B	1	2	3	4	5	6	7	8	9	Final
(Alberta) Brad Jacobs 🔨	1	0	1	0	1	0	2	0	1	6
(Japan) Tsuyoshi Yamaguchi	0	1	0	2	0	1	0	1	0	5

=== Playoffs ===
Quarterfinals
1	(Switzerland) Yannick Schwaller	8
8	(Scotland) Grant Hardie	6
4	(Scotland) Bruce Mouat	4
5	(Manitoba) Matt Dunstone	5
2	(Alberta) Brad Jacobs	6
7	(United States) Daniel Casper	5
3	(Italy) Stefano Spiller	2
6	(Sweden) Oskar Eriksson	7

Semifinals
1	(Switzerland) Yannick Schwaller	6
5	(Manitoba) Matt Dunstone	2
2	(Alberta) Brad Jacobs	7
6	(Sweden) Oskar Eriksson	3

Final
1	(Switzerland) Yannick Schwaller
2	(Alberta) Brad Jacobs

==== Quarterfinals ====
Saturday, November 21, 3:00 pm

Sheet A	1	2	3	4	5	6	7	8	Final
(Switzerland) Yannick Schwaller 🔨	2	0	0	2	0	1	0	3	8
(Scotland) Grant Hardie	0	0	2	0	2	0	2	0	6

Sheet B	1	2	3	4	5	6	7	8	Final
(Scotland) Bruce Mouat 🔨	2	0	1	0	0	0	1	0	4
(Manitoba) Matt Dunstone	0	1	0	1	0	1	0	2	5

Sheet C	1	2	3	4	5	6	7	8	9	Final
(Alberta) Brad Jacobs 🔨	0	1	0	0	1	0	2	1	1	6
(United States) Daniel Casper	2	0	1	2	0	0	0	0	0	5

Sheet D	1	2	3	4	5	6	7	8	Final
(Italy) Stefano Spiller 🔨	1	0	1	0	0	0	0	X	2
(Sweden) Oskar Eriksson	0	1	0	1	2	2	1	X	7

==== Semifinals ====
Saturday, November 21, 8:00 pm

Sheet B	1	2	3	4	5	6	7	8	Final
(Alberta) Brad Jacobs 🔨	1	0	2	0	0	2	2	X	7
(Sweden) Oskar Eriksson	0	2	0	1	0	0	0	X	3

Sheet C	1	2	3	4	5	6	7	8	Final
(Switzerland) Yannick Schwaller 🔨	2	0	2	1	1	0	X	X	6
(Manitoba) Matt Dunstone	0	1	0	0	0	1	X	X	2

==== Final ====
Sunday, November 22, 3:00 pm

Team	1	2	3	4	5	6	7	8	Final
(Switzerland) Yannick Schwaller 🔨									0
(Alberta) Brad Jacobs									0

== Women ==
=== Teams ===
The teams are listed as follows:

Skip	Third	Second	Lead	Alternate	Locale
Christina Black	Jill Brothers	Marlee Powers	Lindsey Burgess	Karlee Everist	Halifax, Nova Scotia
Kerri Einarson	Shannon Birchard	Karlee Burgess	Jocelyn Peterman		Gimli, Manitoba
Satsuki Fujisawa	Yako Matsuzawa	Yumi Suzuki	Yurika Yoshida		Kitami, Japan
Kim Min-ji (Fourth)	Gim Eun-ji (Skip)	Kim Su-ji	Seol Ye-eun	Seol Ye-ji	Uijeongbu, South Korea
Anna Hasselborg	Sara McManus	Agnes Knochenhauer	Sofia Scharback		Sundbyberg, Sweden
Rachel Homan	Tracy Fleury	Emma Miskew	Sarah Wilkes		Ottawa, Ontario
Kim Kyeong-ae (Note: Kim Kyeong-ae skipped Team Kang as Kang Bo-bae was training with the mixed doubles national team. Kim Min-seo moved from alternate to third.)	Kim Min-seo	Shim Yu-jeong	Kim Ji-soo		Jeonbuk, South Korea
Ikue Kitazawa	Seina Nakajima	Minori Suzuki	Hasumi Ishigooka		Nagano, Japan
Mina Kobayashi	Kaho Onodera	Yuna Kotani	Anna Ohmiya		Sapporo, Japan
Miku Nihira	Momoha Tabata	Sae Yamamoto	Mikoto Nakajima		Sapporo, Japan
Anne O'Hara	Anya Normandeau	Sydney Mullaney	Ella Fleming		(United States) Chaska, Minnesota
Park Seo-jin (Fourth)	Park You-been (Skip)	Yang Tae-i	Kim Su-jin		Chuncheon, South Korea
Alina Pätz	Selina Witschonke	Stefanie Berset	Renée Frigo		Geneva, Switzerland
Xenia Schwaller	Selina Gafner	Fabienne Rieder	Selina Rychiger		Zurich, Switzerland
Selena Sturmay	Dezaray Hawes	Brianna Cullen (Note: Alternate Brianna Cullen on Team Sturmay played second for the tournament, as Danielle Schmiemann was away. Dezaray Hawes moved from second to third.)	Paige Papley		Edmonton, Alberta
Isabella Wranå	Almida de Val	Moa Dryburgh	Maria Larsson		Sundbyberg, Sweden

=== Round robin standings ===
Final Round Robin Standings

Key
Teams to Playoffs
Teams to Tiebreaker

Pool A	W	SOW	SOL	L	PF	PA	Pts	LSD
(Sweden) Isabella Wranå	2	1	0	1	26	21	8	16.00
(Japan) Ikue Kitazawa	2	1	1	0	27	19	8	105.70
(South Korea) Kim Kyeong-ae	2	0	0	2	16	22	6	211.10
(South Korea) Gim Eun-ji	0	0	0	4	18	28	0	45.70

Pool B	W	SOW	SOL	L	PF	PA	Pts	LSD
(Japan) Miku Nihira	4	0	0	0	33	11	12	88.70
(Manitoba) Kerri Einarson	2	0	0	2	21	23	6	21.50
(South Korea) Park You-been	1	0	0	3	17	27	3	25.20
(United States) Anne O'Hara	1	0	0	3	16	29	3	212.20

Pool C	W	SOW	SOL	L	PF	PA	Pts	LSD
(Sweden) Anna Hasselborg	3	0	0	1	28	19	9	18.40
(Switzerland) Xenia Schwaller	3	0	0	1	26	16	9	20.00
(Japan) Satsuki Fujisawa	2	0	0	2	21	19	6	60.10
(Nova Scotia) Christina Black	0	0	0	4	14	32	0	123.20

Pool D	W	SOW	SOL	L	PF	PA	Pts	LSD
(Ontario) Rachel Homan	3	0	0	1	23	20	9	114.50
(Switzerland) Alina Pätz	2	0	1	1	23	15	7	85.80
(Japan) Mina Kobayashi	2	0	0	2	21	24	6	89.90
(Alberta) Selena Sturmay	1	0	0	3	19	24	3	154.10

=== Round robin results ===
All draw times are listed in Atlantic Time (UTC−04:00).

==== Draw 1 ====
Tuesday, November 17, 8:30 am

Sheet B	1	2	3	4	5	6	7	8	Final
(Manitoba) Kerri Einarson 🔨	2	0	0	1	0	0	3	X	6
(United States) Anne O'Hara	0	1	1	0	0	1	0	X	3

Sheet D	1	2	3	4	5	6	7	8	Final
(Sweden) Anna Hasselborg 🔨	2	1	0	1	0	2	0	X	6
(Japan) Satsuki Fujisawa	0	0	1	0	1	0	1	X	3

==== Draw 2 ====
Tuesday, November 17, 12:00 pm

Sheet C	1	2	3	4	5	6	7	8	Final
(Ontario) Rachel Homan	0	2	1	0	0	5	0	X	8
(Alberta) Selena Sturmay 🔨	1	0	0	2	1	0	1	X	5

Sheet D	1	2	3	4	5	6	7	8	Final
(South Korea) Gim Eun-ji 🔨	2	0	0	0	0	1	0	X	3
(Japan) Ikue Kitazawa	0	0	1	4	1	0	2	X	8

==== Draw 3 ====
Tuesday, November 17, 4:00 pm

Sheet C	1	2	3	4	5	6	7	8	Final
(Japan) Miku Nihira	1	1	1	1	0	4	X	X	8
(South Korea) Park You-been 🔨	0	0	0	0	1	0	X	X	1

Sheet D	1	2	3	4	5	6	7	8	Final
(Sweden) Isabella Wranå 🔨	0	1	3	1	3	X	X	X	8
(South Korea) Kim Kyeong-ae	1	0	0	0	0	X	X	X	1

==== Draw 4 ====
Tuesday, November 17, 8:00 pm

Sheet B	1	2	3	4	5	6	7	8	Final
(Switzerland) Xenia Schwaller 🔨	3	0	2	1	0	0	1	X	7
(Nova Scotia) Christina Black	0	1	0	0	1	1	0	X	3

Sheet D	1	2	3	4	5	6	7	8	Final
(Switzerland) Alina Pätz 🔨	1	2	0	2	2	0	0	X	7
(Japan) Mina Kobayashi	0	0	2	0	0	0	1	X	3

==== Draw 5 ====
Wednesday, November 18, 8:30 am

Sheet A	1	2	3	4	5	6	7	8	Final
(Japan) Miku Nihira 🔨	3	0	3	0	2	1	X	X	9
(United States) Anne O'Hara	0	1	0	2	0	0	X	X	3

Sheet B	1	2	3	4	5	6	7	8	9	Final
(Sweden) Isabella Wranå 🔨	0	1	0	2	0	2	0	0	1	6
(Japan) Ikue Kitazawa	1	0	1	0	1	0	0	2	0	5

==== Draw 6 ====
Wednesday, November 18, 12:00 pm

Sheet A	1	2	3	4	5	6	7	8	Final
(Switzerland) Xenia Schwaller 🔨	0	1	0	2	0	0	2	X	5
(Japan) Satsuki Fujisawa	0	0	2	0	4	1	0	X	7

Sheet B	1	2	3	4	5	6	7	8	Final
(South Korea) Gim Eun-ji	0	0	0	0	1	0	2	0	3
(South Korea) Kim Kyeong-ae 🔨	0	1	0	1	0	1	0	1	4

==== Draw 7 ====
Wednesday, November 18, 4:00 pm

Sheet A	1	2	3	4	5	6	7	8	Final
(Manitoba) Kerri Einarson	1	0	0	2	0	0	3	1	7
(South Korea) Park You-been 🔨	0	3	1	0	2	2	0	0	8

Sheet B	1	2	3	4	5	6	7	8	Final
(Switzerland) Alina Pätz 🔨	1	3	0	1	1	X	X	X	6
(Alberta) Selena Sturmay	0	0	0	0	0	X	X	X	0

==== Draw 8 ====
Wednesday, November 18, 8:00 pm

Sheet A	1	2	3	4	5	6	7	8	Final
(Sweden) Anna Hasselborg 🔨	0	3	0	3	0	4	X	X	10
(Nova Scotia) Christina Black	1	0	2	0	1	0	X	X	4

Sheet B	1	2	3	4	5	6	7	8	Final
(Ontario) Rachel Homan 🔨	2	1	0	2	0	1	0	X	6
(Japan) Mina Kobayashi	0	0	1	0	2	0	1	X	4

==== Draw 9 ====
Thursday, November 19, 8:00 am

Sheet B	1	2	3	4	5	6	7	8	Final
(Switzerland) Xenia Schwaller	0	1	0	2	0	1	1	X	5
(South Korea) Park You-been 🔨	1	0	0	0	1	0	0	X	2

Sheet D	1	2	3	4	5	6	7	8	9	Final
(Switzerland) Alina Pätz 🔨	1	0	1	0	2	0	1	0	0	5
(Japan) Ikue Kitazawa	0	1	0	1	0	2	0	1	1	6

==== Draw 10 ====
Thursday, November 19, 11:30 am

Sheet B	1	2	3	4	5	6	7	8	Final
(Manitoba) Kerri Einarson 🔨	2	0	1	0	1	0	1	1	6
(Japan) Satsuki Fujisawa	0	1	0	2	0	1	0	0	4

Sheet C	1	2	3	4	5	6	7	8	Final
(South Korea) Gim Eun-ji	0	1	0	0	2	0	4	0	7
(Japan) Mina Kobayashi 🔨	1	0	3	2	0	1	0	1	8

Sheet D	1	2	3	4	5	6	7	8	Final
(Sweden) Anna Hasselborg	0	1	2	3	0	2	X	X	8
(United States) Anne O'Hara 🔨	1	0	0	0	2	0	X	X	3

==== Draw 11 ====
Thursday, November 19, 3:30 pm

Sheet C	1	2	3	4	5	6	7	8	Final
(Sweden) Isabella Wranå	0	1	0	1	0	2	0	0	4
(Alberta) Selena Sturmay 🔨	1	0	1	0	1	0	3	4	10

Sheet D	1	2	3	4	5	6	7	8	Final
(Ontario) Rachel Homan 🔨	0	0	2	0	0	1	0	X	3
(South Korea) Kim Kyeong-ae	1	1	0	1	1	0	2	X	6

==== Draw 12 ====
Thursday, November 19, 7:30 pm

Sheet B	1	2	3	4	5	6	7	8	Final
(Japan) Miku Nihira 🔨	2	0	2	0	1	0	0	3	8
(Nova Scotia) Christina Black	0	1	0	2	0	2	0	0	5

==== Draw 13 ====
Friday, November 20, 8:30 am

Sheet A	1	2	3	4	5	6	7	8	Final
(Japan) Mina Kobayashi 🔨	0	2	0	1	0	1	1	1	6
(Alberta) Selena Sturmay	1	0	1	0	2	0	0	0	4

Sheet B	1	2	3	4	5	6	7	8	Final
(South Korea) Kim Kyeong-ae	0	2	0	0	2	0	1	X	5
(Japan) Ikue Kitazawa 🔨	2	0	4	1	0	1	0	X	8

Sheet C	1	2	3	4	5	6	7	8	Final
(South Korea) Park You-been	1	0	1	0	0	2	1	1	6
(United States) Anne O'Hara 🔨	0	4	0	2	1	0	0	0	7

==== Draw 14 ====
Friday, November 20, 12:00 pm

Sheet C	1	2	3	4	5	6	7	8	Final
(Switzerland) Xenia Schwaller	0	3	0	2	0	0	4	X	9
(Sweden) Anna Hasselborg 🔨	1	0	1	0	0	2	0	X	4

==== Draw 15 ====
Friday, November 20, 4:00 pm

Sheet A	1	2	3	4	5	6	7	8	Final
(South Korea) Gim Eun-ji	0	2	0	1	0	0	2	0	5
(Sweden) Isabella Wranå 🔨	1	0	2	0	0	3	0	2	8

Sheet D	1	2	3	4	5	6	7	8	Final
(Japan) Satsuki Fujisawa 🔨	2	1	0	1	1	0	2	X	7
(Nova Scotia) Christina Black	0	0	1	0	0	1	0	X	2

==== Draw 16 ====
Friday, November 20, 8:00 pm

Sheet C	1	2	3	4	5	6	7	8	Final
(Ontario) Rachel Homan 🔨	1	0	1	0	2	0	0	2	6
(Switzerland) Alina Pätz	0	1	0	2	0	1	1	0	5

Sheet D	1	2	3	4	5	6	7	8	Final
(Manitoba) Kerri Einarson	0	0	0	1	1	0	0	X	2
(Japan) Miku Nihira 🔨	2	1	1	0	0	1	3	X	8

=== Tiebreaker ===
Saturday, November 21, 7:30 am

Sheet B	1	2	3	4	5	6	7	8	Final
(Manitoba) Kerri Einarson 🔨	3	4	2	0	2	X	X	X	11
(Japan) Satsuki Fujisawa	0	0	0	1	0	X	X	X	1

=== Playoffs ===
Quarterfinals
1	(Japan) Miku Nihira	8
8	(Manitoba) Kerri Einarson	3
4	(Ontario) Rachel Homan	6
5	(Sweden) Isabella Wranå	2
2	(Sweden) Anna Hasselborg	3
7	(Switzerland) Alina Pätz	7
3	(Switzerland) Xenia Schwaller	7
6	(Japan) Ikue Kitazawa	6

Semifinals
1	(Japan) Miku Nihira	7
4	(Ontario) Rachel Homan	5
7	(Switzerland) Alina Pätz	6
3	(Switzerland) Xenia Schwaller	2

Final
1	(Japan) Miku Nihira	7
7	(Switzerland) Alina Pätz	8

==== Quarterfinals ====
Saturday, November 21, 11:00 am

Sheet A	1	2	3	4	5	6	7	8	Final
(Japan) Miku Nihira 🔨	2	1	0	1	1	0	3	X	8
(Manitoba) Kerri Einarson	0	0	2	0	0	1	0	X	3

Sheet B	1	2	3	4	5	6	7	8	9	Final
(Switzerland) Xenia Schwaller 🔨	2	0	0	1	0	2	1	0	1	7
(Japan) Ikue Kitazawa	0	1	1	0	3	0	0	1	0	6

Sheet C	1	2	3	4	5	6	7	8	Final
(Ontario) Rachel Homan 🔨	1	0	1	1	0	0	2	1	6
(Sweden) Isabella Wranå	0	1	0	0	0	1	0	0	2

Sheet D	1	2	3	4	5	6	7	8	Final
(Sweden) Anna Hasselborg 🔨	1	0	0	2	0	0	0	X	3
(Switzerland) Alina Pätz	0	2	1	0	2	1	1	X	7

==== Semifinals ====
Saturday, November 21, 8:00 pm

Sheet A	1	2	3	4	5	6	7	8	Final
(Switzerland) Alina Pätz	0	2	0	1	1	0	1	1	6
(Switzerland) Xenia Schwaller 🔨	0	0	1	0	0	1	0	0	2

Sheet D	1	2	3	4	5	6	7	8	Final
(Japan) Miku Nihira 🔨	0	1	1	0	0	3	0	2	7
(Ontario) Rachel Homan	1	0	0	1	1	0	2	0	5

==== Final ====
Sunday, November 22, 11:00 am

Team	1	2	3	4	5	6	7	8	Final
(Japan) Miku Nihira 🔨	1	0	2	0	2	0	2	0	7
(Switzerland) Alina Pätz	0	2	0	2	0	2	0	2	8
