= 2018 United States Men's Curling Championship =

- Host city: Fargo, North Dakota
- Arena: Scheels Arena
- Dates: March 3–10
- Winner: (Washington (state)) Team Persinger
- Curling club: Granite CC, Seattle, Washington
- Skip: Greg Persinger
- Third: Rich Ruohonen
- Second: Colin Hufman
- Lead: Philip Tilker
- Finalist: (Minnesota) Heath McCormick

The 2018 United States Men's Curling Championship was held from March 3 to 10 at the Scheels Arena in Fargo, North Dakota. It was held in conjunction with the 2018 United States Women's Curling Championship.

== Teams ==
Ten teams qualified to participate in the 2018 national championship.

Skip	Third	Second	Lead	Locale
Todd Birr	John Benton	Hunter Clawson	Tom O'Connor	Blaine, Minnesota
Pete Fenson	Shawn Rojeski	Mark Fenner	Alex Fenson	Bemidji, Minnesota
Heath McCormick	Chris Plys	Korey Dropkin	Tom Howell	Blaine, Minnesota
Greg Persinger	Rich Ruohonen	Colin Hufman	Phil Tilker	(Washington (state)) Seattle, Washington
Jed Brundidge	Jordan Brown	Evan Workin	Cameron Rittenour	Sioux Falls, South Dakota
Alex Leichter	Martin Sather	Chris Bond	Jared Wydysh	Boston, Massachusetts
Sean Beighton (Fourth)	Kroy Nernberger (Skip)	Derrick McLean	Quinn Evenson	Blaine, Minnesota
Scott Dunnam	Cody Clouser	Trevor Host	Ethan Meyers	Philadelphia, Pennsylvania
Nicholas Connolly	Chase Sinnett	Andrew McDonald	Andrew Dunnam	(Washington (state)) Seattle, Washington
Tucker Smith	Kyle Kakela	Timothy Hodek	Will Pryor	Bismarck, North Dakota

== Round-robin standings ==
Final round-robin standings

Key
Teams to playoffs
Teams to tiebreakers

Skip	W	L
(Minnesota) Heath McCormick	8	1
(Washington (state)) Greg Persinger	8	1
(Minnesota) Todd Birr	6	3
(Minnesota) Kroy Nernberger	5	4
(South Dakota) Jed Brundidge	5	4
(Washington (state)) Nicholas Connolly	4	5
(Minnesota) Pete Fenson	4	5
(Massachusetts) Alex Leichter	3	6
(Pennsylvania) Scott Dunnam	1	8
(North Dakota) Tucker Smith	1	8

== Round-robin results ==
All draw times are listed in Central Standard Time.

=== Draw 1 ===
Saturday, March 03, 4:30pm

Team	1	2	3	4	5	6	7	8	9	10	Final
Jed Brundidge	0	0	1	0	0	2	0	1	0	X	4
Greg Persinger	3	1	0	1	1	0	1	0	1	X	8

Team	1	2	3	4	5	6	7	8	9	10	Final
Alex Leichter	0	0	1	0	0	2	0	0	0	0	3
Pete Fenson	1	0	0	0	2	0	0	0	0	4	7

Team	1	2	3	4	5	6	7	8	9	10	Final
Heath McCormick	4	0	3	2	0	0	0	2	X	X	11
Scott Dunnam	0	1	0	0	1	1	1	0	X	X	4

Team	1	2	3	4	5	6	7	8	9	10	Final
Todd Birr	0	1	0	1	0	2	0	1	0	2	7
Kroy Nernberger	0	0	2	0	2	0	0	0	1	0	5

Team	1	2	3	4	5	6	7	8	9	10	11	Final
Tucker Smith	0	0	0	2	0	0	2	1	1	1	0	7
Nicholas Connolly	0	1	1	0	2	3	0	0	0	0	1	8

=== Draw 2 ===
Sunday, March 04, 8:00am

Team	1	2	3	4	5	6	7	8	9	10	Final
Todd Birr	1	0	2	0	0	2	0	2	0	1	8
Nicholas Connolly	0	1	0	0	1	0	2	0	1	0	5

Team	1	2	3	4	5	6	7	8	9	10	Final
Scott Dunnam	0	2	0	1	0	1	0	1	0	1	6
Kroy Nernberger	2	0	2	0	2	0	0	0	1	0	7

Team	1	2	3	4	5	6	7	8	9	10	Final
Tucker Smith	1	0	1	0	2	1	0	2	3	X	10
Alex Leichter	0	0	0	2	0	0	1	0	0	X	3

Team	1	2	3	4	5	6	7	8	9	10	Final
Pete Fenson	1	1	0	2	0	0	1	0	0	2	7
Jed Brundidge	0	0	4	0	0	1	0	1	0	0	6

Team	1	2	3	4	5	6	7	8	9	10	Final
Greg Persinger	0	2	0	0	2	0	1	3	X	X	8
Heath McCormick	0	0	0	2	0	1	0	0	X	X	3

=== Draw 3 ===
Sunday, March 04, 4:00pm

Team	1	2	3	4	5	6	7	8	9	10	Final
Pete Fenson	0	2	2	1	1	0	X	X	X	X	6
Tucker Smith	0	0	0	0	0	1	X	X	X	X	1

Team	1	2	3	4	5	6	7	8	9	10	Final
Heath McCormick	1	0	1	2	0	0	0	2	X	X	6
Todd Birr	0	1	0	0	0	1	0	0	X	X	2

Team	1	2	3	4	5	6	7	8	9	10	Final
Nicholas Connolly	0	0	1	1	0	1	0	2	0	X	5
Kroy Nernberger	2	0	0	0	3	0	2	0	1	X	8

Team	1	2	3	4	5	6	7	8	9	10	Final
Alex Leichter	0	0	2	0	1	0	0	1	0	0	4
Greg Persinger	0	0	0	2	0	1	0	0	2	1	6

Team	1	2	3	4	5	6	7	8	9	10	Final
Jed Brundidge	3	0	0	1	0	1	0	2	0	2	9
Scott Dunnam	0	1	2	0	1	0	3	0	0	0	7

=== Draw 4 ===
Monday, March 05, 10:00am

Team	1	2	3	4	5	6	7	8	9	10	Final
Heath McCormick	0	1	0	1	0	1	0	0	0	2	5
Kroy Nernberger	0	0	2	0	1	0	0	1	0	0	4

Team	1	2	3	4	5	6	7	8	9	10	Final
Tucker Smith	0	2	0	0	2	0	0	0	0	X	4
Jed Brundidge	2	0	1	1	0	1	0	1	1	X	7

Team	1	2	3	4	5	6	7	8	9	10	Final
Pete Fenson	0	1	0	1	0	0	1	0	0	X	3
Greg Persinger	1	0	2	0	1	0	0	0	2	X	6

Team	1	2	3	4	5	6	7	8	9	10	Final
Nicholas Connolly	1	0	0	0	2	0	2	1	1	X	7
Scott Dunnam	0	1	1	1	0	2	0	0	0	X	5

Team	1	2	3	4	5	6	7	8	9	10	Final
Alex Leichter	3	1	0	2	2	X	X	X	X	X	8
Todd Birr	0	0	1	0	0	X	X	X	X	X	1

=== Draw 5 ===
Monday, March 05, 7:00pm

Team	1	2	3	4	5	6	7	8	9	10	11	Final
Scott Dunnam	1	0	0	0	0	1	0	2	0	1	0	5
Alex Leichter	0	0	1	1	1	0	1	0	1	0	1	6

Team	1	2	3	4	5	6	7	8	9	10	Final
Greg Persinger	5	0	2	0	0	0	3	X	X	X	10
Nicholas Connolly	0	3	0	1	0	0	0	X	X	X	4

Team	1	2	3	4	5	6	7	8	9	10	Final
Jed Brundidge	2	0	1	1	1	0	3	X	X	X	8
Todd Birr	0	2	0	0	0	1	0	X	X	X	3

Team	1	2	3	4	5	6	7	8	9	10	Final
Tucker Smith	0	1	0	0	1	0	1	0	X	X	3
Heath McCormick	1	0	2	0	0	2	0	2	X	X	7

Team	1	2	3	4	5	6	7	8	9	10	Final
Pete Fenson	1	2	0	0	0	1	0	0	0	X	4
Kroy Nernberger	0	0	2	0	1	0	0	3	2	X	8

=== Draw 6 ===
Tuesday, March 06, 12:00pm

Team	1	2	3	4	5	6	7	8	9	10	11	Final
Nicholas Connolly	1	1	0	2	0	0	0	0	1	0	0	5
Jed Brundidge	0	0	1	0	1	0	1	1	0	1	1	6

Team	1	2	3	4	5	6	7	8	9	10	Final
Pete Fenson	0	0	2	0	1	0	0	0	0	1	4
Heath McCormick	1	1	0	2	0	0	0	0	1	0	5

Team	1	2	3	4	5	6	7	8	9	10	Final
Scott Dunnam	1	0	2	0	0	1	0	1	1	1	7
Tucker Smith	0	2	0	1	1	0	2	0	0	0	6

Team	1	2	3	4	5	6	7	8	9	10	11	Final
Kroy Nernberger	0	0	0	0	1	0	0	0	1	0	0	2
Alex Leichter	0	0	1	0	0	0	0	0	0	1	1	3

Team	1	2	3	4	5	6	7	8	9	10	11	Final
Todd Birr	1	0	2	0	1	0	0	1	0	0	1	6
Greg Persinger	0	1	0	1	0	2	0	0	0	1	0	5

=== Draw 7 ===
Tuesday, March 06, 8:00pm

Team	1	2	3	4	5	6	7	8	9	10	Final
Tucker Smith	1	0	1	0	1	0	1	0	X	X	4
Todd Birr	0	1	0	1	0	1	0	5	X	X	8

Team	1	2	3	4	5	6	7	8	9	10	Final
Kroy Nernberger	0	2	0	1	0	0	0	1	0	0	4
Greg Persinger	0	0	1	0	0	0	2	0	1	1	5

Team	1	2	3	4	5	6	7	8	9	10	Final
Alex Leichter	0	0	0	2	0	0	0	0	2	X	4
Nicholas Connolly	0	0	1	0	2	1	0	2	0	X	6

Team	1	2	3	4	5	6	7	8	9	10	Final
Scott Dunnam	0	0	2	0	2	0	0	0	0	X	4
Pete Fenson	0	1	0	2	0	0	3	1	3	X	10

Team	1	2	3	4	5	6	7	8	9	10	Final
Heath McCormick	1	0	3	4	0	2	X	X	X	X	10
Jed Brundidge	0	3	0	0	0	0	X	X	X	X	3

=== Draw 8 ===
Wednesday, March 07, 12:00pm

Team	1	2	3	4	5	6	7	8	9	10	Final
Alex Leichter	0	0	0	0	3	0	1	0	X	X	4
Heath McCormick	2	2	0	1	0	1	0	3	X	X	9

Team	1	2	3	4	5	6	7	8	9	10	Final
Todd Birr	0	0	0	2	0	1	1	0	2	1	7
Scott Dunnam	1	0	1	0	1	0	0	2	0	0	5

Team	1	2	3	4	5	6	7	8	9	10	Final
Kroy Nernberger	1	0	0	2	1	0	2	0	3	X	9
Jed Brundidge	0	1	1	0	0	1	0	1	0	X	4

Team	1	2	3	4	5	6	7	8	9	10	Final
Greg Persinger	1	0	0	1	0	3	0	2	X	X	7
Tucker Smith	0	1	0	0	1	0	0	0	X	X	2

Team	1	2	3	4	5	6	7	8	9	10	Final
Nicholas Connolly	0	0	1	1	0	1	0	0	0	2	5
Pete Fenson	0	0	0	0	2	0	1	1	0	0	4

=== Draw 9 ===
Wednesday, March 07, 8:00pm

Team	1	2	3	4	5	6	7	8	9	10	Final
Greg Persinger	3	1	1	0	1	0	X	X	X	X	6
Scott Dunnam	0	0	0	1	0	1	X	X	X	X	2

Team	1	2	3	4	5	6	7	8	9	10	Final
Jed Brundidge	2	0	2	0	0	1	3	X	X	X	8
Alex Leichter	0	0	0	2	1	0	0	X	X	X	3

Team	1	2	3	4	5	6	7	8	9	10	Final
Todd Birr	1	2	0	1	0	4	0	2	X	X	10
Pete Fenson	0	0	1	0	1	0	2	0	X	X	4

Team	1	2	3	4	5	6	7	8	9	10	Final
Heath McCormick	0	1	0	3	2	1	0	1	X	X	8
Nicholas Connolly	0	0	2	0	0	0	1	0	X	X	3

Team	1	2	3	4	5	6	7	8	9	10	Final
Kroy Nernberger	0	3	0	0	1	1	0	1	0	0	6
Tucker Smith	1	0	0	1	0	0	1	0	1	1	5

== Playoffs ==
Page playoff system
1	(Minnesota) Heath McCormick	4
2	(Washington (state)) Greg Persinger	8
3	(Minnesota) Todd Birr	7
4	(Minnesota) Kroy Nernberger	6

Semifinal
1	(Minnesota) Heath McCormick	8
3	(Minnesota) Todd Birr	1

Final
2	(Washington (state)) Greg Persinger	7
1	(Minnesota) Heath McCormick	5

=== 1 vs. 2 ===
Thursday, March 8, 8:00pm

Team	1	2	3	4	5	6	7	8	9	10	11	Final
Greg Persinger	2	0	0	1	2	0	1	0	0	1	1	8
Heath McCormick	0	0	1	0	0	1	0	1	1	0	0	4

Player percentages
(Washington (state)) Team Persinger		(Minnesota) Team McCormick	
Phil Tilker	88%	Thomas Howell	96%
Colin Hufman	91%	Korey Dropkin	79%
Rich Ruohonen	97%	Christopher Plys	72%
Greg Persinger	97%	Heath McCormick	80%
Total	93%	Total	82%

=== 3 vs. 4 ===
Thursday, March 8, 8:00pm

Team	1	2	3	4	5	6	7	8	9	10	Final
Todd Birr	0	2	0	0	1	2	0	1	0	1	7
Kroy Nernberger	0	0	1	1	0	0	1	0	3	0	6

Player percentages
(Minnesota) Team Birr		(Minnesota) Team Nernberger	
Tom O'Connor	89%	Quinn Evenson	100%
Hunter Clawson	89%	Derrick McLean	88%
John Benton	70%	Kroy Nernberger	95%
Todd Birr	86%	Sean Beighton	84%
Total	83%	Total	92%

=== Semifinal ===
Friday, March 9, 7:00pm

Team	1	2	3	4	5	6	7	8	9	10	Final
Heath McCormick	2	0	3	2	1	X	X	X	X	X	8
Todd Birr	0	1	0	0	0	X	X	X	X	X	1

Player percentages
(Minnesota) Team McCormick		(Minnesota) Team Birr	
Thomas Howell	93%	Tom O'Connor	74%
Korey Dropkin	78%	Hunter Clawson	84%
Christopher Plys	100%	John Benton	83%
Heath McCormick	97%	Todd Birr	49%
Total	92%	Total	72%

=== Final ===
Saturday, March 10, 5:00 pm CT

Team	1	2	3	4	5	6	7	8	9	10	Final
(Washington (state)) Greg Persinger	0	2	0	1	0	0	2	1	0	1	7
(Minnesota) Heath McCormick	0	0	1	0	2	1	0	0	1	0	5

Player percentages
(Washington (state)) Team Persinger		(Minnesota) Team McCormick	
Philip Tilker	93%	Thomas Howell	85%
Colin Hufman	83%	Korey Dropkin	82%
Rich Ruohonen	90%	Chris Plys	71%
Greg Persinger	81%	Heath McCormick	74%
Total	87%	Total	78%
