= Jeff Isaacson =

American curler (born 1983)

- Curler
- Other names: Jeffrey Glen Isaacson
- Born: July 14, 1983 (age 43); Virginia, Minnesota, U.S.
- Height: 5 ft 8 in (173 cm)

Team
- Curling club: Chaska CC, Chaska, Minnesota

Curling career
- World Championship: 1 (2009)
- Olympic: 2 (2010, 2014)
Medal record
Men's curling
Representing the United States
United States Men's Championship
Gold medal – first place	2009 Broomfield
Silver medal – second place	2002 Eveleth	Team
Bronze medal – third place	2013 Green Bay
United States Olympic Trials
Gold medal – first place	2009 Broomfield	Team
Gold medal – first place	2013 Fargo	Team
Winter Universiade
Gold medal – first place	2007 Turin	Team

Jeffrey Glen Isaacson (born July 14, 1983) is an American curler. He is a two-time Olympian, playing on the United States men's curling team at the 2010 and 2014 Winter Olympics.

== Career ==
Isaacson played as second on John Shuster's team which won the US Olympic Trials in February 2009 and earned a spot as the 2010 United States Olympic Team. In addition to John Shuster his other teammates were John Benton and Jason Smith. Chris Plys joined the team as alternate after the Olympic Trials. At the 2010 Winter Olympics in Vancouver, Canada they finished in 10th place.

By winning the 2010 US Olympic Trials, his team also qualified for the 2009 World Men's Championship held in Moncton, Canada. Isaacson and his team finished with a 7–4 record. They lost a tiebreaker match against Team Norway to qualify for the semifinals and finished fifth overall.

Isaacson left Shuster's team after the 2010 Olympics to take time away from competitive curling but returned for the 2013 Olympic Trials where they again won. At the 2014 Winter Olympics in Sochi, Russia they finished in 9th place.

== Personal life ==
Isaacson has degrees from Bemidji State University and University of Wisconsin-Superior. He currently works at the Chaska Curling Center as the Curling Center Manager.

== Teammates ==
2009 Moncton World Championships

2010 Vancouver Winter Olympics

- John Shuster, Skip
- Jason Smith, Third
- John Benton, Lead
- Chris Plys, Alternate
