= JayCee Cooper =

American transgender powerlifter

JayCee Cooper (born June 15, 1987) is an American transgender powerlifter and LGBTQ+ advocate. She gained national attention for her legal challenge against USA Powerlifting, after it barred her from competing in the women's division due to her gender identity.

== Early life and background ==
Cooper participated in soccer, t-ball wrestling, track and field and curling, when she was growing up. She excelled at curling, and competed at the World Juniors in 2007. She changed her name to JayCee legally when she was 28, as she transitioned her gender identity. Cooper then became interested in roller derby, because of its trans-inclusive policy. In 2017, she broke her ankle and turned to powerlifting.

== Legal history ==
In 2018, Cooper paid for an annual membership with USA Powerlifting, so she could take part in functions in Minnesota. She was granted approval and sent in a "therapeutic use exemptions standard process form", seeking approval for her prescribed use of spironolactone. Later that same year, USA Powerlifting denied Cooper’s application to compete in the women’s category and revoked her competitive status, making her ineligible to compete in any future USA Powerlifting events. In 2019, USA Powerlifting, which previously did not have a formal policy on transgender athletes' participation, officially banned transgender women (male to female) from the women's division competition. The organization alleged that hormone levels and other physiological factors gave transgender women a competitive advantage.

In 2021, Cooper filed a lawsuit against USA Powerlifting in Minnesota state court, claiming that the organization had violated the Minnesota Human Rights Act, which prohibits discrimination on the basis of gender identity, among other characteristics.

In March 2023, a judge ruled in Cooper’s favor, concluding that USA Powerlifting had discriminated against her based on gender identity and ordering the organization to revise its policy. In March 2024, the Minnesota Court of Appeals overturned that ruling, stating it had found "genuine issues of material fact as to whether defendant excluded plaintiff from the women's division of its weightlifting competitions because of her transgender status." Cooper then appealed to the Minnesota Supreme Court, and in December 2024, the court heard oral arguments in the case.
