= John Benton (curler) =

American curler (born 1969)

- Curler
- Born: June 23, 1969 (age 57); Stillwater, Minnesota, U.S.

Team
- Curling club: Four Seasons Curling Club, Blaine, MN, St. Paul, Minnesota
- Alternate: John Benton

Curling career
- World Championship: 1 (2009)
- Olympic: 1 (2010)
Medal record
Men's curling
Representing Minnesota
United States Men's Curling Championship
Gold medal – first place	2009 Broomfield
Silver medal – second place	2017 Everett
United States Olympic Curling Trials
Gold medal – first place	2009 Broomfield	Team
Bronze medal – third place	2017 Omaha	Team

John Benton (born June 23, 1969) is an American curler from Plymouth, Minnesota. He competed on John Shuster's team at the 2010 Vancouver Winter Olympics.

== Curling career ==
Benton started curling in 1975 and competed at his first and only U.S. Junior National Championship in 1987. He has competed at the United States Men's Championship ten times, his first in 1997.

In 1991 Benton qualified for his first Olympic Trials but failed to make it to the Games. He would go on to compete in the Olympic Trials two more times, in 1997 and 2005, before finding success his fourth time in 2009. Benton's team won the 2009 Trials which earned them a spot representing the United States at the 2010 Vancouver Olympic Games as well as the 2009 World Championship, since the Trials were also that year's National Championship. Benton played as lead on the team, which included John Shuster (skip), Jason Smith (third), and Jeff Isaacson (second). Chris Plys joined the team as alternate after the Olympic Trials.

In April 2009, Benton's team participated in the Men's World Championship in Moncton, Canada. His team placed fifth with a 7–4 record. At the 2010 Olympics, Team USA finished 10th with a record of 2–7. After the Olympics Benton left the team to form his own team.

Benton was hired by NBC Sports to work as a curling analyst during the 2014 Winter Olympics.

At the 2017 United States Men's Championship Benton played second for Todd Birr. Team Birr earned a silver medal, losing to Team John Shuster in the final.

Benton has helped Jared Allen's team of ex-NFL players turned curlers, both as coach and alternate.

== Personal life ==
He is a member of the Beta Theta Pi fraternity's Beta Pi chapter at the University of Minnesota, Twin Cities campus.

== Teams ==
Season	Skip	Third	Second	Lead	Events
2008–09	John Shuster	Jason Smith	Jeff Isaacson	John Benton	2009 USMCC/USOCT, 2009 WMCC
2009–10	John Shuster	Jason Smith	Jeff Isaacson	John Benton	2010 OG
2010–11	John Benton	Andy Jukich	Jeff Puleo	Erik Ordway	
2011–12	John Benton	Ryan Lemke (fourth)	Jake Will	Steve Day	
2015–16	Todd Birr	Doug Pottinger	John Benton	Tom O'Connor	2016 USMCC
2016–17	Todd Birr	Rich Ruohonen	John Benton	Tom O'Connor	2017 USMCC
2017–18	Todd Birr	John Benton	Hunter Clawson	Tom O'Connor	2017 USOCT, 2018 USMCC
