= Bryan Burgess =

Canadian curler (born 1977)

- Curler
- Born: January 30, 1977 (age 49); Longlac, Ontario

Team
- Curling club: Kakabeka Falls Curling Club; Kakabeka Falls, ON
- Skip: Bryan Burgess
- Third: Gary Weiss
- Second: Dale Wiersema
- Lead: Aaron Rogalski

Curling career
- Member Association: Northern Ontario
- Brier: 1 (2001)

Bryan Burgess (born January 30, 1977) is a Canadian curler from Thunder Bay, Ontario. He was a member of the Northern Ontario team at the 2001 Nokia Brier.

Burgess was a member of the Al Hackner rink from the late 1990s to 2002. In 2001, Burgess won his only Northern Ontario provincial title, playing third for the team. At the 2001 Brier in Ottawa, the team finished with a 5-6 record. Burgess curled 79% during the tournament.

Except for playing for Hackner in 2007-08, Burgess has skipped his own team since 2002. His only World Curling Tour event wins were the St. Paul Cash Spiel in 2006 and the 2000 North Bay Curling Classic with Hackner.

== Personal life ==
Burgess works as a senior accountant for the Gateway Casinos in Thunder Bay.
