= St. Paul Curling Club =

American curling club

Coordinates: 44°56′46″N 93°7′11″W

- Location: 470 Selby Avenue; St. Paul, Minnesota 55102

Information
- Established: 1885
- Club type: Dedicated Ice
- USCA region: Minnesota
- Sheets of ice: Eight
- Rock colors: Red and Yellow
- Website: http://stpaulcurlingclub.org

The St. Paul Curling Club (SPCC) is a historic curling club located on Selby Avenue in Saint Paul, Minnesota, United States. It is the curling club with the largest active membership in the United States, boasting over 1,200 members. The club was first established in 1885, and the current St. Paul Curling Club was formed when the Capitol City Curling Club and Nushka Curling Club merged in 1912. It is the oldest curling club in Minnesota. In April 2011, the club hosted the 2011 World Mixed Doubles Curling Championship and the 2011 World Senior Curling Championships.

== History ==
The first St. Paul Curling Club was incorporated on November 16, 1885. The first curling games in St. Paul were played on the Mississippi River. In 1891, the St. Paul Curling Club built its first facilities on Raspberry Island and became part of the Northwest Curling Association, which included clubs from Minnesota, Wisconsin, North Dakota, and Illinois, a year later. The original St. Paul Curling Club closed in 1904 and was succeeded by the Capitol City Curling Club the following year. In 1912, the Capitol City Curling Club and the Nushka Curling Club merged to form the new St. Paul Curling Club, establishing permanent facilities in a two-story clubhouse with eight sheets of natural ice on Selby Avenue. Artificial ice was added in stages from 1939 to 1947.

To attract more curlers, the Metro League and the Mixed League were formed in 1961 and 1962, respectively. However, club membership declined during the 1960s and 1970s, leading to discussions about disbanding. Despite these challenges, the club persevered, continuing to renovate and expand its facilities. In 1988, the club hosted the Men's Nationals, becoming the first club in the U.S. to host every national curling championship event.

== Leagues ==
The St. Paul Curling Club hosts several different curling leagues, all of which are club leagues.

== Club champions ==
The club hosts an annual championship.

== Famous members ==
- Allison Pottinger – 2003 World Champion, runner-up at the 1996, 1999, and 2006 World Championships, 2010 Olympian, and runner-up at the 2011 US Nationals.
- John Benton – 2009 US Men's National Champion, 2010 Olympian.
- Margie Smith – Notable curler with a long-standing association with the St. Paul Curling Club.
- Rich Ruohonen – 2008 and 2018 US Nationals Champion, runner-up at the 2011, 2013, 2017, 2019, and 2020 US Nationals.
- Tabitha Peterson – Two-time Olympian (2018, 2022), 2021 World Championship Bronze Medalist, and US Nationals Champion in 2012, 2020, 2023, 2024, and 2025.
