= 2011 Curlers Corner Autumn Gold Curling Classic =

- Host city: Calgary, Alberta
- Arena: Calgary Curling Club
- Dates: October 7–10
- Winner: (Manitoba) Cathy Overton-Clapham
- Curling club: Fort Rouge CC, Winnipeg
- Skip: Cathy Overton-Clapham
- Third: Jenna Loder
- Second: Ashley Howard
- Lead: Breanne Meakin
- Finalist: (Alberta) Amy Nixon

The 2011 Curlers Corner Autumn Gold Curling Classic was held from October 7 to 10 at the Calgary Curling Club in Calgary, Alberta. It was the first women's Grand Slam event of the 2011–12 curling season and the twenty-sixth time the tournament has been held. The purse for the event was CAD$54,000, and the winning team of Cathy Overton-Clapham of Manitoba, received CAD$14,000. Overton-Clapham defeated Alberta's Amy Nixon, who skipped for Shannon Kleibrink, in the final.

== Teams ==
Skip	Third	Second	Lead	Locale
Cheryl Bernard	Susan O'Connor	Lori Olson-Johns	Jennifer Sadleir	Calgary, Alberta
Erika Brown	Debbie McCormick	Ann Swisshelm	Jessica Schultz	Madison, Wisconsin
Chelsea Carey	Kristy Jenion	Kristen Foster	Lindsay Titheridge	Morden, Manitoba
Nadine Chyz	Rebecca Pattison	Whitney More	Kimberly Anderson	Calgary, Alberta
Delia DeJong	Jessica Monk	Amy Janko	Aisha Veiner	Grande Prairie, Alberta
Tanilla Doyle	Lindsay Amudsen-Meyer	Janice Bailey	Christina Faulkner	Calgary, Alberta
Lisa Eyamie	Maria Bushell	Jodi Marthaller	Kyla MacLachlan	Calgary, Alberta
Dana Ferguson	Nikki Smith	Denise Kinghorn	Cori Morris	Calgary, Alberta
Kerry Galusha	Sharon Cormier	Wendy Miller	Megan Cormier	Yellowknife, Northwest Territories
Amber Holland	Kim Schneider	Tammy Schneider	Heather Kalenchuk	Kronau, Saskatchewan
Rachel Homan	Emma Miskew	Alison Kreviazuk	Lisa Weagle	Ottawa, Ontario
Tracy Horgan	Jenn Seabrook	Jenna Enge	Amanda Gates	Sudbury, Ontario
Jennifer Jones	Kaitlyn Lawes	Joëlle Sabourin	Dawn Askin	Winnipeg, Manitoba
Kim Ji-Sun	Lee Seul-bee	Gim Un-chi	Lee Hyun-Jung	South Korea
Jessie Kaufman	Nicky Kaufman	Amanda Coderre	Stephanie Enright	Edmonton, Alberta
Patti Lank	Nina Spatola	Caitlin Maroldo	Mackenzie Lank	(New York (state)) Lewiston, New York
Stefanie Lawton	Sherry Anderson	Sherri Singler	Marliese Kasner	Saskatoon, Saskatchewan
Krista McCarville	Ashley Miharija	Kari Lavoie	Sarah Lang	Thunder Bay, Ontario
Sherry Middaugh	Jo-Ann Rizzo	Lee Merklinger	Leigh Armstrong	Coldwater, Ontario
Eve Muirhead	Anna Sloan	Vicki Adams	Claire Hamilton	Perth, Scotland
Heather Nedohin	Beth Iskiw	Jessica Mair	Laine Peters	Edmonton, Alberta
Amy Nixon (Note: Nixon was substituted as skip in place of Shannon Kleibrink, and Bronwen Webster moved to third. Alternate Carolyn Darbyshire took Webster's place at second.)	Bronwen Webster	Carolyn Darbyshire	Chelsey Matson	Calgary, Alberta
Cathy Overton-Clapham	Jenna Loder	Ashley Howard	Breanne Meakin	Winnipeg, Manitoba
Desirée Owen	Cary-Anne Sallows	Lindsay Makichuk	Stephanie Malekoff	Grande Prairie, Alberta
Allison Pottinger	Nicole Joraanstad	Natalie Nicholson	Tabitha Peterson	(United States) St. Paul, Minnesota
Liudmila Privivkova	Anna Sidorova	Nkeiruka Ezekh	Ekaterina Galkina	Moscow, Russia
Casey Scheidegger	Kalynn Park	Jessie Scheidegger	Joelle Horn	Lethbridge, Alberta
Kelly Scott	Dailene Sivertson	Sasha Carter	Jacquie Armstrong	Kelowna, British Columbia
Renée Sonnenberg	Lawnie MacDonald	Kristie Moore	Rona Pasika	Grande Prairie, Alberta
Valerie Sweeting	Leslie Rogers	Joanne Taylor	Rachelle Pidherny	Edmonton, Alberta
Jill Thurston	Kerri Einarson	Kendra Georges	Sarah Wazney	Winnipeg, Manitoba
Crystal Webster	Erin Carmody	Geri-Lynn Ramsay	Samantha Preston	Calgary, Alberta

== Knockout brackets ==
=== A event ===
First Knockout
(Alberta) Valerie Sweeting	4
(Ontario) Krista McCarville	6
(Wisconsin) Erika Brown	2
(Saskatchewan) Stefanie Lawton	5
(Alberta) Renée Sonnenberg	4
(British Columbia) Kelly Scott	5
(United States) Allison Pottinger	7
(Alberta) Amy Nixon	9
(Alberta) Lisa Eyamie	3
(Manitoba) Cathy Overton-Clapham	10
(South Korea) Kim Ji-Sun	5
(Ontario) Rachel Homan	4
(Manitoba) Jill Thurston	3
(Scotland) Eve Muirhead	5
(Northwest Territories) Kerry Galusha	7
(Saskatchewan) Amber Holland	6

Quarterfinals
(Ontario) Krista McCarville	4
(Saskatchewan) Stefanie Lawton	5
(British Columbia) Kelly Scott	6
(Alberta) Amy Nixon	8
(Manitoba) Cathy Overton-Clapham	7
(South Korea) Kim Ji-Sun	5
(Scotland) Eve Muirhead	9
(Northwest Territories) Kerry Galusha	1

Semifinals
(Saskatchewan) Stefanie Lawton	1
(Alberta) Amy Nixon	8
(Manitoba) Cathy Overton-Clapham	8
(Scotland) Eve Muirhead	2

Qualifier 1
(Alberta) Amy Nixon	8
(Manitoba) Cathy Overton-Clapham	3

First Knockout
(Alberta) Crystal Webster	7
(Alberta) Desirée Owen	4
(New York (state)) Patti Lank	5
(Manitoba) Chelsea Carey	9
(Alberta) Casey Scheidegger	2
(Alberta) Cheryl Bernard	6
(Alberta) Delia DeJong	6
(Alberta) Heather Nedohin	2
(Alberta) Nadine Chyz	5
(Ontario) Sherry Middaugh	7
(Alberta) Dana Ferguson	5
(Alberta) Jessie Kaufman	3
(Russia) Liudmila Privivkova	3
(Ontario) Tracy Horgan	7
(Alberta) Tanilla Doyle	1
(Manitoba) Jennifer Jones	7

Quarterfinals
(Alberta) Crystal Webster	7
(Manitoba) Chelsea Carey	3
(Alberta) Cheryl Bernard	3
(Alberta) Delia DeJong	5
(Ontario) Sherry Middaugh	4
(Alberta) Dana Ferguson	3
(Ontario) Tracy Horgan	7
(Manitoba) Jennifer Jones	6

Semifinals
(Alberta) Crystal Webster	6
(Alberta) Delia DeJong	7
(Ontario) Sherry Middaugh	4
(Ontario) Tracy Horgan	3

Qualifier 2
(Alberta) Delia DeJong	2
(Ontario) Sherry Middaugh	7

=== B event ===
Second Knockout
(Alberta) Valerie Sweeting	3
(Wisconsin) Erika Brown	8
(United States) Allison Pottinger	3
(Alberta) Renée Sonnenberg	6

Quarterfinals
(Manitoba) Jennifer Jones	6
(Wisconsin) Erika Brown	2
(Alberta) Dana Ferguson	4
(Alberta) Renée Sonnenberg	9

Semifinals
(Manitoba) Jennifer Jones	3
(Alberta) Crystal Webster	7
(Alberta) Renée Sonnenberg	4
(Scotland) Eve Muirhead	3

To Qualifier 3
(Alberta) Crystal Webster	8
(Alberta) Renée Sonnenberg	5

Second Knockout
(Alberta) Lisa Eyamie	5
(Ontario) Rachel Homan	6
(Manitoba) Jill Thurston	6
(Saskatchewan) Amber Holland	5

Quarterfinals
(Alberta) Cheryl Bernard	8
(Ontario) Rachel Homan	6
(Manitoba) Chelsea Carey	6
(Manitoba) Jill Thurston	7

Semifinals
(Alberta) Cheryl Bernard	6
(Manitoba) Jill Thurston	5

To Qualifier 3
(Alberta) Cheryl Bernard	4
(Manitoba) Cathy Overton-Clapham	7
Qualifier 3
(Alberta) Crystal Webster	4
(Manitoba) Cathy Overton-Clapham	6

Second Knockout
(Alberta) Desirée Owen	9
(New York (state)) Patti Lank	4
(Alberta) Casey Scheidegger	6
(Alberta) Heather Nedohin	2

Quarterfinals
(Northwest Territories) Kerry Galusha	6
(Alberta) Desirée Owen	5
(South Korea) Kim Ji-Sun	8
(Alberta) Casey Scheidegger	3

Semifinals
(Northwest Territories) Kerry Galusha	5
(Ontario) Tracy Horgan	6
(South Korea) Kim Ji-Sun	2
(Saskatchewan) Stefanie Lawton	7

To Qualifier 4
(Ontario) Tracy Horgan	6
(Saskatchewan) Stefanie Lawton	7

Second Knockout
(Alberta) Nadine Chyz	7
(Alberta) Jessie Kaufman	4
(Russia) Liudmila Privivkova	5
(Alberta) Tanilla Doyle	3

Quarterfinals
(British Columbia) Kelly Scott	5
(Alberta) Nadine Chyz	8
(Ontario) Krista McCarville	9
(Russia) Liudmila Privivkova	4

Semifinals
(Alberta) Nadine Chyz	2
(Ontario) Krista McCarville	5

To Qualifier 4
(Ontario) Krista McCarville	10
(Alberta) Delia DeJong	3
Qualifier 4
(Saskatchewan) Stefanie Lawton	4
(Ontario) Krista McCarville	5

=== C event ===
Third Knockout
(Alberta) Valerie Sweeting	9
(United States) Allison Pottinger	5
(Alberta) Lisa Eyamie	5
(Saskatchewan) Amber Holland	9

Quarterfinals
(Northwest Territories) Kerry Galusha	4
(Alberta) Valerie Sweeting	8
(South Korea) Kim Ji-Sun	6
(Saskatchewan) Amber Holland	7

Semifinals
(Alberta) Valerie Sweeting	3
(Saskatchewan) Amber Holland	7

Qualifier 5
(Saskatchewan) Amber Holland	2
(Alberta) Crystal Webster	7

Third Knockout
(Ontario) Rachel Homan	5
(Manitoba) Chelsea Carey	6

Quarterfinals
(Wisconsin) Erika Brown	4
(Alberta) Dana Ferguson	8
(Alberta) Nadine Chyz	6
(Manitoba) Chelsea Carey	3

Semifinals
(Alberta) Dana Ferguson	7
(Alberta) Delia DeJong	6
(Alberta) Nadine Chyz	7
(Ontario) Tracy Horgan	4

Qualifier 6
(Alberta) Dana Ferguson	7
(Alberta) Nadine Chyz	2

Third Knockout
(British Columbia) Kelly Scott	6
(Russia) Liudmila Privivkova	4

Quarterfinals
(Manitoba) Jill Thurston	3
(British Columbia) Kelly Scott	6
(Alberta) Desirée Owen	3
(Alberta) Casey Scheidegger	8

Semifinals
(British Columbia) Kelly Scott	7
(Alberta) Renée Sonnenberg	5
(Alberta) Cheryl Bernard	6
(Alberta) Casey Scheidegger	4

Qualifier 7
(British Columbia) Kelly Scott	5
(Alberta) Cheryl Bernard	8

Third Knockout
(New York (state)) Patti Lank	1
(Alberta) Heather Nedohin	8
(Alberta) Jessie Kaufman	5
(Alberta) Tanilla Doyle	3

Quarterfinals
(Manitoba) Jennifer Jones	5
(Alberta) Heather Nedohin	2
(Scotland) Eve Muirhead	6
(Alberta) Jessie Kaufman	4

Semifinals
(Manitoba) Jennifer Jones	6
(Scotland) Eve Muirhead	3

Qualifier 8
(Manitoba) Jennifer Jones	4
(Saskatchewan) Stefanie Lawton	5

== Knockout results ==
=== Draw 1 ===
October 7, 9:30 AM MT

Sheet 1	1	2	3	4	5	6	7	8	Final
(Alberta) Valerie Sweeting 🔨	1	0	0	0	2	0	1	0	4
(Ontario) Krista McCarville	0	0	2	2	0	1	0	1	6

Sheet 2	1	2	3	4	5	6	7	8	Final
(Wisconsin) Erika Brown	0	0	0	0	0	2	0	0	2
(Saskatchewan) Stefanie Lawton 🔨	0	1	1	1	1	0	1	0	5

Sheet 3	1	2	3	4	5	6	7	8	9	Final
(Alberta) Renée Sonnenberg 🔨	0	1	0	1	1	0	0	1	0	4
(British Columbia) Kelly Scott	1	0	2	0	0	1	0	0	1	5

Sheet 4	1	2	3	4	5	6	7	8	9	Final
(United States) Allison Pottinger	0	2	0	1	0	1	0	3	0	7
(Alberta) Amy Nixon 🔨	1	0	2	0	2	0	2	0	2	9

Sheet 5	1	2	3	4	5	6	7	8	Final
(Alberta) Lisa Eyamie	0	1	1	0	1	0	X	X	3
(Manitoba) Cathy Overton-Clapham 🔨	2	0	0	3	0	5	X	X	10

Sheet 6	1	2	3	4	5	6	7	8	Final
(South Korea) Kim Ji-Sun	0	1	0	0	1	1	1	1	5
(Ontario) Rachel Homan 🔨	2	0	1	1	0	0	0	0	4

Sheet 7	1	2	3	4	5	6	7	8	Final
(Manitoba) Jill Thurston	1	0	0	1	0	1	0	X	3
(Scotland) Eve Muirhead 🔨	0	1	1	0	2	0	1	X	5

Sheet 8	1	2	3	4	5	6	7	8	9	Final
(Northwest Territories) Kerry Galusha 🔨	0	1	0	3	0	0	2	0	1	7
(Saskatchewan) Amber Holland	1	0	2	0	1	1	0	1	0	6

=== Draw 2 ===
October 7, 1:15 PM MT

Sheet 1	1	2	3	4	5	6	7	8	Final
(Alberta) Crystal Webster 🔨	2	0	2	1	0	1	0	1	7
(Alberta) Desirée Owen	0	1	0	0	2	0	1	0	4

Sheet 2	1	2	3	4	5	6	7	8	Final
(New York (state)) Patti Lank 🔨	2	0	0	0	0	3	0	0	5
(Manitoba) Chelsea Carey	0	1	1	1	2	0	4	0	9

Sheet 3	1	2	3	4	5	6	7	8	Final
(Alberta) Casey Scheidegger	0	0	0	1	0	1	0	0	2
(Alberta) Cheryl Bernard 🔨	1	1	1	0	1	0	2	0	6

Sheet 4	1	2	3	4	5	6	7	8	Final
(Alberta) Delia DeJong	0	1	0	2	1	0	2	0	6
(Alberta) Heather Nedohin 🔨	0	0	1	0	0	1	0	0	2

Sheet 5	1	2	3	4	5	6	7	8	Final
(Alberta) Nadine Chyz	0	1	0	2	1	0	1	0	5
(Ontario) Sherry Middaugh 🔨	2	0	3	0	0	1	0	1	7

Sheet 6	1	2	3	4	5	6	7	8	Final
(Alberta) Dana Ferguson 🔨	0	0	1	1	1	0	0	2	5
(Alberta) Jessie Kaufman	0	2	0	0	0	0	1	0	0

Sheet 7	1	2	3	4	5	6	7	8	Final
(Russia) Liudmila Privivkova	1	0	1	0	1	0	0	X	3
(Ontario) Tracy Horgan 🔨	0	0	0	1	0	4	2	X	7

Sheet 8	1	2	3	4	5	6	7	8	Final
(Alberta) Tanilla Doyle	0	0	0	0	1	X	X	X	1
(Manitoba) Jennifer Jones 🔨	2	0	2	3	0	X	X	X	7

=== Draw 3 ===
October 7, 5:15 PM MT

Sheet 1	1	2	3	4	5	6	7	8	Final
(Ontario) Krista McCarville 🔨	1	0	1	0	1	1	0	0	4
(Saskatchewan) Stefanie Lawton	0	1	0	1	0	0	2	1	5

Sheet 2	1	2	3	4	5	6	7	8	Final
(British Columbia) Kelly Scott 🔨	0	1	0	2	0	2	1	X	6
(Alberta) Amy Nixon	4	0	1	0	3	0	0	X	8

Sheet 3	1	2	3	4	5	6	7	8	Final
(Manitoba) Cathy Overton-Clapham	0	3	0	1	0	1	1	1	7
(South Korea) Kim Ji-Sun 🔨	2	0	1	0	2	0	0	0	5

Sheet 4	1	2	3	4	5	6	7	8	Final
(Scotland) Eve Muirhead 🔨	2	2	1	0	4	X	X	X	9
(Northwest Territories) Kerry Galusha	0	0	0	1	0	X	X	X	1

Sheet 5	1	2	3	4	5	6	7	8	Final
(Alberta) Valerie Sweeting 🔨	1	0	0	1	0	1	0	X	3
(Wisconsin) Erika Brown	0	2	2	0	2	0	2	X	8

Sheet 6	1	2	3	4	5	6	7	8	Final
(United States) Allison Pottinger	1	1	0	1	0	0	0	X	3
(Alberta) Renée Sonnenberg 🔨	0	0	2	0	2	1	1	X	6

Sheet 7	1	2	3	4	5	6	7	8	Final
(Alberta) Lisa Eyamie	0	2	0	1	2	0	1	0	5
(Ontario) Rachel Homan 🔨	1	0	1	0	0	3	0	1	6

Sheet 8	1	2	3	4	5	6	7	8	Final
(Manitoba) Jill Thurston 🔨	0	4	1	1	0	0	0	X	6
(Saskatchewan) Amber Holland	0	0	0	0	2	1	2	X	5

=== Draw 4 ===
October 7, 9:00 PM MT

Sheet 1	1	2	3	4	5	6	7	8	Final
(Alberta) Crystal Webster 🔨	1	0	2	1	0	2	0	1	7
(Manitoba) Chelsea Carey	0	1	0	0	1	0	1	0	3

Sheet 2	1	2	3	4	5	6	7	8	Final
(Alberta) Cheryl Bernard	0	0	1	0	0	1	1	X	3
(Alberta) Delia DeJong 🔨	1	1	0	2	1	0	0	X	5

Sheet 3	1	2	3	4	5	6	7	8	Final
(Ontario) Sherry Middaugh	0	0	1	0	1	1	0	1	4
(Alberta) Dana Ferguson 🔨	0	2	0	1	0	0	0	0	3

Sheet 4	1	2	3	4	5	6	7	8	9	Final
(Ontario) Tracy Horgan	0	0	2	0	2	1	0	1	1	7
(Manitoba) Jennifer Jones 🔨	1	1	0	1	0	0	3	0	0	6

Sheet 5	1	2	3	4	5	6	7	8	Final
(Alberta) Desirée Owen	1	0	3	2	0	3	X	X	9
(New York (state)) Patti Lank 🔨	0	2	0	0	2	0	X	X	4

Sheet 6	1	2	3	4	5	6	7	8	Final
(Alberta) Casey Scheidegger	0	0	0	1	1	0	2	2	6
(Alberta) Heather Nedohin 🔨	0	0	1	0	0	1	0	0	2

Sheet 7	1	2	3	4	5	6	7	8	Final
(Alberta) Nadine Chyz 🔨	2	1	0	0	0	4	0	X	7
(Alberta) Jessie Kaufman	0	0	2	1	1	0	0	X	4

Sheet 8	1	2	3	4	5	6	7	8	Final
(Russia) Liudmila Privivkova 🔨	2	0	1	0	1	0	1	X	5
(Alberta) Tanilla Doyle	0	1	0	1	0	1	0	X	3

=== Draw 5 ===
October 8, 9:00 AM MT

Sheet 1	1	2	3	4	5	6	7	8	Final
(Saskatchewan) Stefanie Lawton	0	0	1	0	X	X	X	X	1
(Alberta) Amy Nixon 🔨	3	1	0	4	X	X	X	X	8

Sheet 2	1	2	3	4	5	6	7	8	Final
(Manitoba) Cathy Overton-Clapham	0	3	0	3	2	X	X	X	8
(Scotland) Eve Muirhead 🔨	1	0	1	0	0	X	X	X	2

Sheet 3	1	2	3	4	5	6	7	8	Final
(Manitoba) Jennifer Jones 🔨	2	0	2	1	1	0	X	X	6
(Wisconsin) Erika Brown	0	1	0	0	0	1	X	X	2

Sheet 4	1	2	3	4	5	6	7	8	Final
(Alberta) Dana Ferguson	1	2	0	1	0	0	0	X	4
(Alberta) Renée Sonnenberg 🔨	0	0	3	0	4	1	1	X	9

Sheet 5	1	2	3	4	5	6	7	8	Final
(Alberta) Cheryl Bernard	0	3	0	1	3	0	0	0	0
(Ontario) Rachel Homan 🔨	2	0	2	0	0	1	1	0	0

Sheet 6	1	2	3	4	5	6	7	8	9	Final
(Manitoba) Chelsea Carey 🔨	0	1	1	0	2	0	2	0	0	6
(Manitoba) Jill Thurston	2	0	0	1	0	1	0	2	1	7

=== Draw 6 ===
October 8, 12:45 PM MT

Sheet 1	1	2	3	4	5	6	7	8	Final
(Alberta) Crystal Webster 🔨	2	0	1	0	0	0	2	1	6
(Alberta) Delia DeJong	0	1	0	0	2	4	0	0	7

Sheet 2	1	2	3	4	5	6	7	8	Final
(Ontario) Sherry Middaugh	0	0	2	1	0	0	0	1	4
(Ontario) Tracy Horgan 🔨	1	1	0	0	0	0	1	0	3

Sheet 3	1	2	3	4	5	6	7	8	9	Final
(Northwest Territories) Kerry Galusha	0	0	0	3	1	1	0	0	1	6
(Alberta) Desiree Owen 🔨	0	0	2	0	0	0	1	2	0	5

Sheet 4	1	2	3	4	5	6	7	8	Final
(South Korea) Kim Ji-Sun 🔨	3	0	0	0	2	0	3	X	8
(Alberta) Casey Scheidegger	0	1	0	1	0	1	0	X	3

Sheet 5	1	2	3	4	5	6	7	8	Final
(British Columbia) Kelly Scott 🔨	1	0	0	0	2	0	2	0	5
(Alberta) Nadine Chyz	0	2	1	2	0	1	0	2	8

Sheet 6	1	2	3	4	5	6	7	8	Final
(Ontario) Krista McCarville 🔨	4	0	1	0	1	0	3	X	9
(Russia) Liudmilla Privivkova	0	1	0	1	0	2	0	X	4

=== Draw 7 ===
October 8, 4:30 PM MT

Sheet 1	1	2	3	4	5	6	7	8	Final
(Alberta) Amy Nixon 🔨	1	0	2	2	0	1	2	X	8
(Manitoba) Cathy Overton-Clapham	0	1	0	0	2	0	0	X	3

Sheet 2	1	2	3	4	5	6	7	8	Final
(Alberta) Valerie Sweeting	0	2	0	0	2	4	0	1	9
(United States) Allison Pottinger 🔨	2	0	1	0	0	0	2	0	5

Sheet 3	1	2	3	4	5	6	7	8	Final
(Alberta) Lisa Eyamie	0	0	4	0	0	0	1	X	5
(Saskatchewan) Amber Holland 🔨	1	1	0	3	2	2	0	X	9

Sheet 4	1	2	3	4	5	6	7	8	Final
(Ontario) Rachel Homan 🔨	0	1	0	2	0	2	0	0	5
(Manitoba) Chelsea Carey	2	0	1	0	1	0	1	1	6

Sheet 5	1	2	3	4	5	6	7	8	Final
(British Columbia) Kelly Scott	1	0	3	0	2	0	0	X	6
(Russia) Liudmilla Privivkova 🔨	0	1	0	2	0	0	1	X	4

Sheet 6	1	2	3	4	5	6	7	8	Final
(New York (state)) Patti Lank	0	1	0	0	X	X	X	X	1
(Alberta) Heather Nedohin 🔨	4	0	2	2	X	X	X	X	8

Sheet 7	1	2	3	4	5	6	7	8	Final
(Alberta) Jessie Kaufman	2	0	0	0	3	0	0	X	5
(Alberta) Tanilla Doyle 🔨	0	0	0	1	0	1	1	X	3

=== Draw 8 ===
October 8, 8:15 PM MT

Sheet 1	1	2	3	4	5	6	7	8	Final
(Alberta) Delia DeJong	0	1	0	0	0	1	X	X	2
(Ontario) Sherry Middaugh 🔨	2	0	1	2	2	0	X	X	7

Sheet 2	1	2	3	4	5	6	7	8	Final
(Manitoba) Jennifer Jones 🔨	2	0	0	0	1	0	0	X	3
(Alberta) Crystal Webster	0	2	1	1	0	2	1	X	7

Sheet 3	1	2	3	4	5	6	7	8	Final
(Alberta) Renee Sonnenberg	0	2	0	0	1	0	0	1	4
(Scotland) Eve Muirhead 🔨	0	0	0	1	0	2	0	0	3

Sheet 4	1	2	3	4	5	6	7	8	Final
(Alberta) Cheryl Bernard	0	0	2	0	1	0	0	3	6
(Manitoba) Jill Thurston 🔨	0	1	0	2	0	0	2	0	5

Sheet 5	1	2	3	4	5	6	7	8	Final
(Northwest Territories) Kerry Galusha 🔨	2	1	1	0	1	0	0	0	5
(Ontario) Tracy Horgan	0	0	0	1	0	1	1	3	6

Sheet 6	1	2	3	4	5	6	7	8	Final
(South Korea) Kim Ji-Sun 🔨	0	0	1	0	1	0	X	X	2
(Saskatchewan) Stefanie Lawton	2	2	0	2	0	1	X	X	7

Sheet 7	1	2	3	4	5	6	7	8	Final
(Alberta) Nadine Chyz	0	1	1	0	0	0	0	X	2
(Ontario) Krista McCarville 🔨	2	0	0	0	1	1	1	X	5

=== Draw 9 ===
October 9, 9:00 AM MT

Sheet 1	1	2	3	4	5	6	7	8	Final
(Alberta) Crystal Webster	0	3	0	2	0	0	2	1	8
(Alberta) Renee Sonnenberg 🔨	2	0	2	0	1	0	0	0	5

Sheet 2	1	2	3	4	5	6	7	8	Final
(Alberta) Cheryl Bernard	1	0	2	0	0	1	0	0	4
(Manitoba) Cathy Overton-Clapham 🔨	0	2	0	1	1	0	0	3	7

Sheet 3	1	2	3	4	5	6	7	8	Final
(Ontario) Tracy Horgan	0	1	0	1	1	0	3	0	6
(Saskatchewan) Stefanie Lawton 🔨	2	0	2	0	0	2	0	1	7

Sheet 4	1	2	3	4	5	6	7	8	Final
(Ontario) Krista McCarville 🔨	4	0	3	0	3	X	X	X	10
(Alberta) Delia DeJong	0	2	0	1	X	X	X	X	3

Sheet 5	1	2	3	4	5	6	7	8	Final
(Wisconsin) Erika Brown 🔨	0	2	0	0	0	1	1	X	4
(Alberta) Dana Ferguson	0	0	3	3	2	0	0	X	8

Sheet 6	1	2	3	4	5	6	7	8	Final
(Manitoba) Jill Thurston	0	0	0	0	2	0	1	X	3
(British Columbia) Kelly Scott 🔨	1	1	0	1	0	3	0	X	6

Sheet 1	1	2	3	4	5	6	7	8	Final
(Alberta) Desiree Owen	0	2	0	0	1	0	0	X	3
(Alberta) Casey Scheidegger 🔨	2	0	2	2	0	1	1	X	8

=== Draw 10 ===
October 9, 12:45 PM MT

Sheet 1	1	2	3	4	5	6	7	8	Final
(Alberta) Crystal Webster	1	0	0	1	0	2	0	X	4
(Manitoba) Cathy Overton-Clapham 🔨	0	1	2	0	2	0	1	X	6

Sheet 2	1	2	3	4	5	6	7	8	Final
(Northwest Territories) Kerry Galusha	0	2	0	0	0	2	X	X	4
(Alberta) Valerie Sweeting 🔨	1	0	2	2	3	0	X	X	8

Sheet 3	1	2	3	4	5	6	7	8	9	Final
(South Korea) Kim Ji-Sun 🔨	0	1	1	0	3	0	1	0	0	6
(Saskatchewan) Amber Holland	2	0	0	1	0	2	0	1	1	7

Sheet 4	1	2	3	4	5	6	7	8	Final
(Alberta) Nadine Chyz 🔨	1	0	1	3	0	0	1	X	6
(Manitoba) Chelsea Carey	0	2	0	0	0	1	0	X	3

Sheet 5	1	2	3	4	5	6	7	8	Final
(Manitoba) Jennifer Jones	0	0	1	0	2	0	0	2	5
(Alberta) Heather Nedohin 🔨	0	0	0	1	0	0	1	0	2

Sheet 6	1	2	3	4	5	6	7	8	Final
(Scotland) Eve Muirhead	0	0	2	1	0	2	0	1	6
(Alberta) Jessie Kaufman 🔨	0	1	0	0	3	0	0	0	4

=== Draw 11 ===
October 9, 4:30 PM MT

Sheet 1	1	2	3	4	5	6	7	8	9	Final
(Saskatchewan) Stefanie Lawton	0	0	2	0	1	0	0	1	0	4
(Ontario) Krista McCarville 🔨	0	1	0	0	0	2	1	0	1	5

Sheet 2	1	2	3	4	5	6	7	8	Final
(Alberta) Valerie Sweeting 🔨	1	0	0	0	2	0	0	X	3
(Saskatchewan) Amber Holland	0	1	2	1	0	2	1	X	7

Sheet 3	1	2	3	4	5	6	7	8	9	Final
(Alberta) Dana Ferguson 🔨	2	0	0	1	0	0	0	3	1	7
(Alberta) Delia DeJong	0	1	2	0	1	1	1	0	0	6

Sheet 4	1	2	3	4	5	6	7	8	Final
(Alberta) Nadine Chyz 🔨	0	1	1	0	3	1	0	1	7
(Ontario) Tracy Horgan	1	0	0	2	0	0	1	0	4

Sheet 5	1	2	3	4	5	6	7	8	Final
(British Columbia) Kelly Scott	0	2	1	0	2	1	0	1	7
(Alberta) Renee Sonnenberg 🔨	1	0	0	2	0	0	2	0	5

Sheet 6	1	2	3	4	5	6	7	8	Final
(Alberta) Casey Scheidegger 🔨	2	0	2	0	0	0	0	X	4
(Alberta) Cheryl Bernard	0	2	0	1	0	2	1	X	6

Sheet 7	1	2	3	4	5	6	7	8	Final
(Manitoba) Jennifer Jones 🔨	0	1	0	0	2	0	3	X	6
(Scotland) Eve Muirhead	0	0	0	2	0	1	0	X	3

=== Draw 12 ===
October 9, 8:15 PM MT

Sheet 1	1	2	3	4	5	6	7	8	Final
(Saskatchewan) Amber Holland	0	0	0	2	0	X	X	X	2
(Alberta) Crystal Webster 🔨	1	2	2	0	2	X	X	X	7

Sheet 2	1	2	3	4	5	6	7	8	Final
(Alberta) Dana Ferguson 🔨	0	2	1	0	4	0	X	X	7
(Alberta) Nadine Chyz	0	0	0	1	0	1	X	X	2

Sheet 3	1	2	3	4	5	6	7	8	9	Final
(British Columbia) Kelly Scott 🔨	0	1	0	0	1	0	2	1	0	5
(Alberta) Cheryl Bernard	0	0	0	2	0	3	0	0	3	8

Sheet 4	1	2	3	4	5	6	7	8	9	Final
(Manitoba) Jennifer Jones	0	0	1	0	2	0	1	0	0	4
(Saskatchewan) Stefanie Lawton 🔨	1	0	0	1	0	1	0	1	1	5

== Playoffs ==
Quarterfinals
(Alberta) Amy Nixon	7
(Alberta) Dana Ferguson	6
(Alberta) Crystal Webster	5
(Ontario) Krista McCarville	7
(Manitoba) Cathy Overton-Clapham	5
(Saskatchewan) Stefanie Lawton	3
(Alberta) Cheryl Bernard	4
(Ontario) Sherry Middaugh	5

Semifinals
(Alberta) Amy Nixon	9
(Ontario) Krista McCarville	2
(Manitoba) Cathy Overton-Clapham	5
(Ontario) Sherry Middaugh	4

Finals
(Alberta) Amy Nixon	2
(Manitoba) Cathy Overton-Clapham	7

=== Quarterfinals ===
October 10, 9:00 AM MT

Sheet 1	1	2	3	4	5	6	7	8	9	Final
(Alberta) Amy Nixon	0	1	1	2	0	0	2	0	1	7
(Alberta) Dana Ferguson 🔨	2	0	0	0	0	2	0	2	0	6

Sheet 2	1	2	3	4	5	6	7	8	Final
(Alberta) Crystal Webster 🔨	2	0	0	0	2	0	1	0	5
(Ontario) Krista McCarville	0	0	3	1	0	2	0	1	7

Sheet 3	1	2	3	4	5	6	7	8	Final
(Manitoba) Cathy Overton-Clapham 🔨	1	0	1	0	1	1	0	1	5
(Saskatchewan) Stefanie Lawton	0	2	0	1	0	0	0	0	3

Sheet 4	1	2	3	4	5	6	7	8	9	Final
(Alberta) Cheryl Bernard 🔨	0	2	0	1	0	0	0	1	0	4
(Ontario) Sherry Middaugh	0	0	2	0	0	0	2	0	1	5

=== Semifinals ===
October 10, 1:00 PM MT

Sheet 1	1	2	3	4	5	6	7	8	Final
(Alberta) Amy Nixon 🔨	1	1	0	3	1	3	X	X	9
(Ontario) Krista McCarville	0	0	2	0	0	0	X	X	2

Sheet 2	1	2	3	4	5	6	7	8	9	Final
(Manitoba) Cathy Overton-Clapham 🔨	1	0	2	0	1	0	0	0	1	5
(Ontario) Sherry Middaugh	0	2	0	1	0	0	0	1	0	4

=== Final ===
October 10, 4:00 PM MT

Sheet 1	1	2	3	4	5	6	7	8	Final
(Alberta) Amy Nixon 🔨	0	0	1	0	1	0	0	X	2
(Manitoba) Cathy Overton-Clapham	0	1	0	2	0	2	2	X	7
