= Tabitha Peterson =

American curler (born 1989)

- Curler
- Born: March 6, 1989 (age 37); Burnsville, Minnesota, U.S.
- Height: 5 ft 4 in (163 cm)

Team
- Curling club: St. Paul CC, St. Paul, MN
- Skip: Tabitha Peterson
- Third: Cory Thiesse
- Second: Tara Peterson
- Lead: Taylor Anderson-Heide

Curling career
- Member Association: United States
- World Championship: 8 (2012, 2014, 2016, 2017, 2021, 2023, 2024, 2025)
- World Mixed Doubles Championship: 2 (2016, 2021)
- Pan Continental Championship: 3 (2022, 2023, 2025)
- Olympic: 3 (2018, 2022, 2026)
Medal record
Representing United States
Women's curling
World Curling Championships
Bronze medal – third place	2021 Calgary
Pan Continental Championships
Bronze medal – third place	2023 Kelowna
World Junior Championships
Bronze medal – third place	2010 Flims
United States National Championships
Gold medal – first place	2012 Philadelphia
Gold medal – first place	2020 Cheney
Gold medal – first place	2023 Denver
Gold medal – first place	2024 East Rutherford
Gold medal – first place	2025 Duluth
Silver medal – second place	2019 Kalamazoo
Silver medal – second place	2017 Everett
Silver medal – second place	2014 Philadelphia
Silver medal – second place	2011 Fargo
Bronze medal – third place	2013 Green Bay
United States Olympic Trials
Gold medal – first place	2017 Omaha
Gold medal – first place	2021 Omaha
Gold medal – first place	2025 Sioux Falls
Silver medal – second place	2013 Fargo
Mixed doubles curling
World Mixed Doubles Championship
Bronze medal – third place	2016 Karlstad
United States Mixed Doubles Championship
Gold medal – first place	2020 Eau Claire
Silver medal – second place	2017 Blaine
Bronze medal – third place	2016 Denver

Tabitha Skelly Peterson (born March 6, 1989) is an American curler from Minneapolis, Minnesota. She was a bronze medalist at the 2010 World Junior Championships and is a five-time women's national champion. She currently is skip of her own team.

== Career ==
=== Junior ===
As a junior, Peterson was a four-time state champion curler and won U.S. national junior championships in 2009 and 2010. In 2009, Peterson played third on her junior rink, skipped by Alexandra Carlson. After winning the U.S. junior title, the team would represent the United States at the 2009 World Junior Curling Championships. The team finished the round robin with a 4–5 record, finishing 5th. In 2010, the Carlson rink won another U.S. junior title, sending the team to the 2010 World Junior Curling Championships. At the 2010 World Juniors, the team finished the round robin in a tie for third place with a 6–3 record. The team won their first playoff match against Switzerland's Manuela Siegrist before losing in the semi-final to Sweden's Anna Hasselborg. That demoted the team to the bronze medal game, where they defeated Switzerland again to finish third overall.

=== 2010–2014 ===
After her junior career ended in 2010, Peterson joined the Allison Pottinger rink at lead position. In their first year together, the team lost in the final of the 2011 United States Women's Curling Championship to Patti Lank. The following season, they avenged this loss by beating Cassandra Johnson's rink to win the 2012 United States Women's Curling Championship. This sent the Pottinger team to the 2012 Ford World Women's Curling Championship to represent the U.S. The team finished the round robin at the 2012 Worlds in a tie with Canada's Heather Nedohin for fourth place and a 7–4 record. However, Canada beat the team in the tie-breaker, forcing the U.S. to settle for 5th. The following season, the team won a bronze medal at the 2013 United States Women's Curling Championship. The team found more success in the 2013–14 season. They won one World Curling Tour (WCT) event over the season, the 2013 Kamloops Crown of Curling. Their success on the World Curling Tour gave them enough points to qualify for the 2014 Ford World Women's Curling Championship, following new rules made by the United States Curling Association, which based World Championship qualifying on Order of Merit points rather than winning the U.S. Championship. At World's Team Pottinger finished sixth, with a record of 6–5. As for the U.S. Championship that season, the team ended up losing in the final to Nina Spatola (now Nina Roth).

=== 2014–2019 ===
For the 2014–15 season, Peterson joined Nina Roth as lead. Team Roth finished fifth at the 2015 National Championship just outside of the playoffs. Peterson claimed another World Curling Tour event win at the 2014 Twin Cities Open.

At the 2016 National Championship, Peterson played third for skip Jamie Sinclair. The team finished the round robin with a 5–1 record but lost in the page playoff 3v4 game to Cory Christensen's team. The US Champion team, skipped by Erika Brown, added Peterson as alternate for the 2016 World Championships, where the team finished 6th. Also in 2016 Peterson joined with Joe Polo to compete at the United States Mixed Doubles World Trials. They finished with an impressive 9–1 record, earning them a spot at the 2016 World Mixed Doubles Championship in Karlstad, Sweden. Peterson and Polo finished the round robin group play undefeated, losing to Team Russia in the semifinals. In the bronze medal match, they defeated Team Scotland 9–7.

For the 2016–17 season, Peterson was back playing with Roth's women's team, this time as third. Team Roth won the Molson Cash Spiel that year, a WCT event. At the 2017 National Championship, they earned a silver medal when they lost to their former teammate Jamie Sinclair in the final. Peterson's team represented the United States at the 2017 Americas Challenge, where they beat Brazil to qualify the U.S. for the 2017 World Championship. Due to the United States Curling Association's point system at the time, they also got to compete at the 2017 World's despite not being the National Champions. At World's Peterson and Team USA finished fifth with a record of 6–5.

At the 2017 US Mixed Doubles Championship, Peterson and teammate Joe Polo earned the silver medal losing to the brother and sister duo of Matt and Becca Hamilton in the final. Later in 2017, Peterson and Polo competed at the first United States Mixed Doubles Olympic Trials, where they finished tied for fifth with a record of 3–4.

Just a month before competing at the Mixed Doubles Olympic Trials, Peterson and her women's team defeated Jamie Sinclair's team in a best-of-three final at the 2017 United States Olympic Curling Trials to earn the right to represent the United States at the 2018 Winter Olympics. At the Olympics, Team Roth finished with a 4–5 record, missing the playoffs. Due to competing at the Olympics, Team Roth opted not to compete in the 2018 US National Championships.

In 2019 Peterson returned to both the United States Women's Championship and Mixed Doubles Championship. In a repeat of the 2017 National Championship final, Peterson's women's team of Nina Roth, Becca Hamilton, and sister Tara Peterson lost to Jamie Sinclair in the final. At the Mixed Doubles Championship, Peterson and Polo went undefeated through the round robin section of the tournament but ultimately lost in the semifinal to eventual champions Cory Christensen and John Shuster.

=== 2019–2022 ===
Peterson skipped Team Roth during the 2019–20 season as Nina Roth was on maternity leave. They had a semifinal finish at the 2019 Tour Challenge Grand Slam event. At the 2020 United States Women's Championship, Peterson earned her second national title and first as skip. In the round robin, Team Peterson's only loss came against Jamie Sinclair, but they then beat Team Sinclair in the 1 vs. 2 page playoff game and again in the final. As United States Champions Team Peterson would have represented the United States at the 2020 World Women's Curling Championship, but they lost that opportunity when the Championship was cancelled due to the COVID-19 pandemic. They also earned a spot at the final Grand Slam of the season, the Champions Cup, which was also cancelled due to the pandemic. Their qualification will instead carry over to the 2021 Champions Cup.

At the 2020 US Mixed Doubles Championship, Peterson and Polo again faced Christensen and Shuster, but this time in the final, and they won 7–4. This was their first mixed doubles national title and earned them a spot at the 2020 World Mixed Doubles Curling Championship and the 2021 United States mixed doubles curling Olympic trials. But about a month before the World Championship was supposed to begin the World Curling Federation announced its cancellation due to the ongoing COVID-19 pandemic. The following year the United States Curling Association announced that the 2021 US Mixed Doubles Championship would be postponed until after the 2021 World Mixed Doubles due to the pandemic, and so as 2020 national champions Peterson and Polo were invited to represent the United States at the 2021 Worlds.

During the 2020 off-season, the team announced that Peterson would remain as skip when Roth returned from maternity leave. Roth re-joined the team as vice-skip at third, with Hamilton moving to second, Tara Peterson to lead, and Geving to alternate. Due to the COVID-19 pandemic, the Peterson team did not compete in events for most of the 2020–21 season until entering a bio-secure bubble held in Calgary, Alberta in the spring of 2021 for three events in a row. The first two events were the Champions Cup and Players' Championship grand slams, with Peterson missing the playoffs at both. The third event in the Calgary bubble for Team Peterson was the 2021 World Women's Championship, in which they earned a spot as 2020 National Champions after the 2021 National Championship was moved to later in the spring due to the pandemic. They finished the 13 game round-robin in fifth place with a 7–6 record, earning them a spot in the playoffs and securing a 2022 Olympic berth for the United States. In the playoffs, Team Peterson defeated Denmark's Madeline Dupont but lost to Switzerland's Silvana Tirinzoni to end up in the bronze medal game. There, Peterson faced off against Sweden's Anna Hasselborg and won with a score of 9–5, including scoring five points in the seventh end. Team Peterson's bronze medal finish was the first World Women's medal for the United States in 15 years, and the first-ever bronze medal. Right after the World Championship, Peterson traveled to Aberdeen, Scotland to compete in the 2021 World Mixed Doubles Curling Championship with Joe Polo. There, the pair finished the round robin with a 5–4 record. This put them in a qualification game against Czech Republic for the seventh direct spot at the 2022 Winter Olympics, which they lost 8–6.

The Peterson rink won their first two events of the 2021–22 season, the US Open of Curling and the 2021 Curlers Corner Autumn Gold Curling Classic. The following week, they played in the 2021 Masters where they made it as far as the quarterfinals. The team then played in the 2021 United States Olympic Curling Trials, where they attempted to return to the Olympics. The team posted a 9–1 record through the round robin, putting them into the best-of-three final against Cory Christensen. The Peterson rink beat Christensen in two-straight games, booking their tickets to the 2022 Winter Olympics. After the Trials, the team played in one event before the Olympics, the Curl Mesabi Classic, which they won, beating Christensen again in the final. At the Olympics, Peterson led the United States to a 4–5 record, missing the playoffs. The team finished off the season by playing in two Slams, the 2022 Players' Championship and the 2022 Champions Cup, missing the playoffs in both events. In mixed doubles that season, she and Joe Polo played in the 2021 United States mixed doubles curling Olympic trials, where they posted a 5–4 round robin record. This put them in a tiebreaker, which they won. In the 3 vs. 4 game, they were not as successful, losing to Jamie Sinclair and Rich Ruohonen.

=== 2022–present ===
Following the 2021–22 season, Nina Roth retired from competitive curling and the team added Cory Thiesse (née Christensen) as their new third. After a semifinal finish at the US Open of Curling, the team missed the playoffs at both the 2022 National and the 2022 Tour Challenge Slam events. They represented the United States at the 2022 Pan Continental Curling Championships where they finished first in the round robin with a 7–1 record. They then lost to South Korea and Canada in the semifinal and bronze medal game respectively, finishing fourth. In their next event, Team Peterson reached the semifinals of the Red Deer Curling Classic where they lost to Rachel Homan. At the 2022 Masters, the team made it to the semifinals before losing to the Einarson rink. The following week, they won the Curl Mesabi Classic. In the new year, the team went undefeated to claim the 2023 United States Women's Curling Championship, defeating Delaney Strouse 8–5 in the final. This qualified them for the 2023 World Women's Curling Championship where they finished just outside the playoffs with a 6–6 record. The team ended their season at the 2023 Players' Championship and the 2023 Champions Cup Grand Slam events where they reached the quarterfinals and semifinals respectively.

Team Peterson won their second event of the 2023–24 season, losing just one game en route to claiming the US Open of Curling. They also had a semifinal finish at the 2023 Stu Sells Oakville Tankard and a quarterfinal appearance at the 2023 Curlers Corner Autumn Gold Curling Classic. For the 2023 Pan Continental Curling Championships, the team changed their lineup with Tara Peterson and Becca Hamilton switching positions to second and lead on the team respectively. The move worked as they finished 6–1 through the round robin. After a semifinal loss to Japan's Satsuki Fujisawa, Team Peterson bounced back to claim the bronze medal, stealing in an extra end to defeat Canada's Kerri Einarson. In Grand Slam play, they only qualified in one of the four events they played in, the 2023 Masters, losing in the quarterfinals to Silvana Tirinzoni. At the 2024 United States Women's Curling Championship, the Peterson rink lost their first game to Sarah Anderson before running the table the rest of the event. In the final, they doubled up on Team Anderson 10–5 to defend their title as national champions and qualify for the 2024 World Women's Curling Championship. At Worlds, the team struggled to find consistency, ultimately finishing 6–6 and failing to reach the playoffs for a second year in a row. Hamilton would announce that she would be stepping back from women's curling at the end of the season. Team Peterson would later announce that Taylor Anderson-Heide would be joining the team as their new lead.

Team Peterson would win the 2025 United States Olympic curling trials, qualifying them to represent the United States at the 2025 Olympic Qualification Event. There, they would finish round robin play with a 5–2 record, then beat Norway's Marianne Rørvik 8–4 to qualify for the 2026 Winter Olympics.

== Personal life ==
Peterson studied at the University of Minnesota College of Pharmacy. She is married and is currently employed as a pharmacist. Her sister is fellow curler Tara Peterson.

== Teams ==
=== Women's ===
Season	Skip	Third	Second	Lead	Alternate	Coach	Events
2005–06	Alex Carlson	Tabitha Peterson	Tara Peterson	Sophie Brorson			2006 USJCC (SF)
2006–07	Alex Carlson	Tabitha Peterson	Tara Peterson	Sophie Brorson			2007 USWCC (4th)
2007–08	Alex Carlson	Tabitha Peterson	Tara Peterson	Sophie Brorson			2008 USJCC (silver)
2008–09	Alex Carlson	Tabitha Peterson	Tara Peterson	Sophie Brorson	Molly Bonner	Howard Restall	2009 USJCC (gold); 2009 WJCC (5th)
2009–10	Alex Carlson	Tabitha Peterson	Tara Peterson	Sophie Brorson	Miranda Solem	Howard Restall	2010 USJCC (gold); 2010 WJCC (bronze)
2010–11	Allison Pottinger	Nicole Joraanstad	Natalie Nicholson	Tabitha Peterson			2011 USWCC (silver)
2011–12	Allison Pottinger	Nicole Joraanstad	Natalie Nicholson	Tabitha Peterson	Cassandra Potter	Derek Brown	2012 USWCC (gold); 2012 WWCC (5th)
2012–13	Allison Pottinger	Nicole Joraanstad	Natalie Nicholson	Tabitha Peterson			2013 USWCC (bronze)
2013–14	Allison Pottinger	Nicole Joraanstad	Natalie Nicholson	Tabitha Peterson	Tara Peterson	Derek Brown	2014 USWCC (silver); 2014 WWCC (6th)
2014–15	Nina Roth	Jamie Sinclair	Becca Hamilton	Tabitha Peterson			2015 USWCC (5th)
2015–16	Jamie Sinclair	Tabitha Peterson	Becca Hamilton	Jenna Haag	Tara Peterson		2016 USWCC (4th)
2015–16	Erika Brown	Allison Pottinger	Nicole Joraanstad	Natalie Nicholson	Tabitha Peterson	Ann Swisshelm	2016 WWCC (6th)
2016–17	Nina Roth	Tabitha Peterson	Aileen Geving	Becca Hamilton	Cory Christensen (WWCC)	Ann Swisshelm	2017 USWCC (silver); 2017 WWCC (5th)
2017–18	Nina Roth	Tabitha Peterson	Aileen Geving	Becca Hamilton	Cory Christensen (OG)	Al Hackner	2017 USOCT (gold); 2018 WOG (8th); 2018 Cont. Cup
2018–19	Nina Roth	Tabitha Peterson	Becca Hamilton	Tara Peterson			2019 USWCC (silver)
2019–20	Tabitha Peterson	Becca Hamilton	Tara Peterson	Aileen Geving		Natalie Nicholson	2020 USWCC (gold)
2020–21	Tabitha Peterson	Nina Roth	Becca Hamilton	Tara Peterson	Aileen Geving	Laine Peters	2021 WWCC (bronze)
2021–22	Tabitha Peterson	Nina Roth	Becca Hamilton	Tara Peterson	Aileen Geving	Laine Peters, Phill Drobnick	2021 USOCT (gold); 2022 WOG (6th)
2022–23	Tabitha Peterson	Cory Thiesse	Becca Hamilton	Tara Peterson	Vicky Persinger (PCCC/WWCC)	Cathy Overton-Clapham	2022 PCCC (4th); 2023 USWCC (gold); 2023 WWCC (7th)
2023–24	Tabitha Peterson	Cory Thiesse	Tara Peterson	Becca Hamilton	Vicky Persinger (PCCC/WWCC)	Cathy Overton-Clapham	2023 PCCC (bronze); 2024 USWCC (gold); 2024 WWCC (7th)
2024–25	Tabitha Peterson	Cory Thiesse	Tara Peterson	Taylor Anderson-Heide	Vicky Persinger	Cathy Overton-Clapham	2025 USWCC (gold); 2025 WWCC (12th)
2025–26	Tabitha Peterson	Cory Thiesse	Tara Peterson	Taylor Anderson-Heide		Cathy Overton-Clapham	

=== Mixed doubles ===
Season	Female	Male	Events
2015–16	Tabitha Peterson	Joe Polo	2016 WMDCC (bronze)
2016–17	Tabitha Peterson	Joe Polo	2017 USMDCC (silver)
2017–18	Tabitha Peterson	Joe Polo	2017 USMDCOT (5th)
2018–19	Tabitha Peterson	Joe Polo	2019 USMDCC (SF)
2019–20	Tabitha Peterson	Joe Polo	2020 USMDCC (gold)
2020–21	Tabitha Peterson	Joe Polo	2021 WMDCC (8th)
2021–22	Tabitha Peterson	Joe Polo	USMDCOT (4th)

== Grand Slam record ==
Key
C	Champion
F	Lost in Final
SF	Lost in Semifinal
QF	Lost in Quarterfinals
R16	Lost in the round of 16
Q	Did not advance to playoffs
T2	Played in Tier 2 event
DNP	Did not participate in event
N/A	Not a Grand Slam event that season

Event	2012–13	2013–14	2014–15	2015–16	2016–17	2017–18	2018–19	2019–20	2020–21	2021–22	2022–23	2023–24	2024–25	2025–26
Masters	T2	DNP	DNP	DNP	DNP	DNP	Q	DNP	N/A	QF	SF	QF	DNP	T2
Tour Challenge	N/A	N/A	N/A	T2	T2	T2	SF	SF	N/A	N/A	Q	Q	DNP	DNP
The National	N/A	N/A	N/A	Q	DNP	DNP	Q	DNP	N/A	DNP	Q	Q	DNP	DNP
Canadian Open	N/A	N/A	Q	DNP	DNP	Q	SF	QF	N/A	N/A	Q	Q	DNP	DNP
Players'	DNP	DNP	DNP	DNP	DNP	QF	DNP	N/A	Q	Q	QF	DNP	DNP	QF
Champions Cup	N/A	N/A	N/A	DNP	DNP	DNP	DNP	N/A	Q	Q	SF	N/A	N/A	N/A

=== Former events ===
Event	2012–13	2013–14	2014–15	2015–16	2016–17	2017–18	2018–19
Elite 10	N/A	N/A	N/A	N/A	N/A	N/A	Q
Autumn Gold	Q	Q	DNP	N/A	N/A	N/A	N/A
Colonial Square	Q	DNP	Q	N/A	N/A	N/A	N/A
