= Aileen Geving =

American curler (born 1987)

- Curler
- Other names: Aileen Miranda Geving
- Born: Aileen Miranda Sormunen; February 13, 1987 (age 39); Duluth, Minnesota, U.S.
- Height: 5 ft 4 in (163 cm)

Team
- Curling club: Duluth CC, Duluth, MN
- Skip: Courtney Benson
- Fourth: Aileen Geving
- Second: Lexi Daly
- Lead: Sara Olson
- Mixed doubles partner: John Shuster

Curling career
- Member Association: United States
- World Championship: 3 (2015, 2017, 2021)
- Pan Continental Championship: 1 (2025)
- Olympic: 3 (2018, 2022, 2026)
Medal record
Women's curling
Representing United States
World Championships
Bronze medal – third place	2021 Calgary
United States Women's Championship
Gold medal – first place	2020 Cheney
Silver medal – second place	2010 Kalamazoo
Silver medal – second place	2013 Green Bay
Silver medal – second place	2016 Jacksonville
Silver medal – second place	2017 Everett
Silver medal – second place	2019 Kalamazoo
Bronze medal – third place	2008 Hibbing
Bronze medal – third place	2012 Philadelphia
Bronze medal – third place	2015 Kalamazoo
United States Olympic Trials
Gold medal – first place	2017 Omaha
Gold medal – first place	2021 Omaha
Bronze medal – third place	2013 Fargo
Mixed doubles curling
United States Mixed Doubles Championship
Bronze medal – third place	2021 Wausau
Bronze medal – third place	2024 Traverse City

Aileen Miranda Geving (née Sormunen; born February 13, 1987) is an American curler from Duluth, Minnesota. She represented the United States on the women's curling team at the 2018 and 2022 Winter Olympics and earned her first national championship in 2020.

== Career ==
Geving began curling in 1996. She was a national junior champion in 2004 and 2007.

Geving skipped a team at the 2005 United States Olympic Curling Trials and qualified for the playoffs in fourth place but lost her page playoffs game against Patti Lank. She also competed at the 2010 United States Olympic Curling Trials but finished outside of the playoffs in fifth place. She then played as third for Patti Lank at the 2010 United States Women's Curling Championship and finished as the runner-up to Erika Brown.

Geving skipped her own team at the 2011 and 2012 United States Women's Curling Championships, finishing sixth and fourth, respectively. She and her then-third Courtney George switched positions the next year and finished second at the 2013 United States Women's Curling Championship. Consequently, she and her team were selected to participate at the 2014 United States Olympic Curling Trials by the United States Curling Association's High Performance Program committee.

At the 2020 United States Women's Championship, Geving earned her first national title as lead for Tabitha Peterson. In the round-robin, Team Peterson's only loss came against Jamie Sinclair but they then beat Team Sinclair in the one vs. 2 page playoff game and again in the final. As United States Champions Team Peterson would have represented the United States at the 2020 World Women's Curling Championship, but they lost that opportunity when the Championship was cancelled due to the COVID-19 pandemic. They also earned a spot at the final Grand Slam of the season, the Champions Cup, which was also cancelled due to the pandemic. Their qualification will instead carry over to the 2021 Champions Cup.

During the 2020 off-season, the team announced that Tabitha Peterson would remain as skip when Roth returned from maternity leave. Roth re-joined the team as vice-skip at third, with Hamilton moving to second, Tara Peterson to lead, and Geving to alternate. Due to the COVID-19 pandemic, the Peterson team did not compete in events for most of the 2020–21 season until entering a bio-secure bubble held in Calgary, Alberta in the spring of 2021 for three events in a row. The first two events were the Champions Cup and Players' Championship grand slams, with the team missing the playoffs at both. The third event in the Calgary bubble for Team Peterson was the 2021 World Women's Championship, in which they earned a spot as 2020 National Champions after the 2021 National Championship was moved to later in the spring due to the pandemic. They finished the 13-game round-robin in fifth place with a 7–6 record, earning them a spot in the playoffs and securing a 2022 Olympic berth for the United States. In the playoffs, Team Peterson defeated Denmark's Madeline Dupont but lost to Switzerland's Silvana Tirinzoni to end up in the bronze medal game. There, Peterson faced off against Sweden's Anna Hasselborg and won with a score of 9–5, including scoring five points in the seventh end. Team Peterson's bronze medal finish was the first World Women's medal for the United States in 15 years, and the first-ever bronze medal.

The Peterson rink won their first two events of the 2021–22 season, the US Open of Curling and the 2021 Curlers Corner Autumn Gold Curling Classic. The following week, they played in the 2021 Masters where they made it as far as the quarterfinals. The team then played in the 2021 United States Olympic Curling Trials, where they attempted to return to the Olympics. Through the round robin, the team posted a 9–1 record, putting them into the best-of-three final against Cory Christensen. The Peterson rink beat Christensen in two-straight games, booking their tickets to the 2022 Winter Olympics. After the Trials, the team played in one event before the Olympics, the Curl Mesabi Classic, which they won, beating Christensen again in the final. At the Olympics, the team finished the round robin with a 4–5 record, missing the playoffs. The team finished off the season by playing in two Slams, the 2022 Players' Championship and the 2022 Champions Cup, missing the playoffs in both events.

== Personal life ==
Geving has a degree in organizational management from the University of Minnesota Duluth. She is currently an insurance commercial client executive. She is married to Garrett Geving, and has one daughter.

== Teams ==
Season	Skip	Third	Second	Lead	Alternate	Coach	Events
2000–01	Aileen Sormunen	Courtney George	Amanda Jensen	Amanda McLean		Seppo Sormunen	2001 USJCC (bronze)
2000–01	Nicole Joraanstad	Kirsten Finch	Katlyn Schmitt	Rebecca Dobie	Aileen Sormunen	Neil Doese	2001 WJCC (7th)
2001–02	Aileen Sormunen	Courtney George	Amanda Jensen	Amanda McLean		Cyndee Johnson	2002 USJCC (silver)
2002–03	Aileen Sormunen	Courtney George	Amanda Jensen	Amanda McLean		Cyndee Johnson	2003 USJCC (silver)
2003–04	Aileen Sormunen	Courtney George	Amanda Jensen	Amanda McLean	Jessica Schultz (WJCC)	Cyndee Johnson	2004 USJCC (gold); 2004 WJCC (4th)
2004–05	Aileen Sormunen	Courtney George	Amanda Jensen	Amanda McLean		Cyndee Johnson	2005 USJCC (5th)
2005–06	Aileen Sormunen	Courtney George	Amanda Jensen	Amanda McLean			2006 USJCC (SF); 2005 USOCT (4th)
2006–07	Aileen Sormunen	Courtney George	Molly Bonner	Jordan Moulton	Monica Walker (WJCC)	Robert Fenson	2007 USJCC (gold); 2007 WJCC (4th)
2007–08	Aileen Sormunen	Courtney George	Molly Bonner	Jordan Moulton			2008 USWCC (bronze)
2008–09	Aileen Sormunen	Molly Bonner	Jessica Schultz	Maureen Brunt			2009 USOCT (5th)
2009–10	Patti Lank	Aileen Sormunen	Caitlin Maroldo	Jessica Schultz			2010 USWCC (silver)
2010–11	Aileen Sormunen	Courtney George	Amanda McLean	Miranda Solem			2011 USWCC (5th)
2011–12	Aileen Sormunen	Courtney George	Amanda McLean	Miranda Solem			2012 USWCC (bronze)
2012–13	Courtney George	Aileen Sormunen	Amanda McLean	Julie Lilla			2013 USWCC (silver)
2013–14	Courtney George	Aileen Sormunen	Amanda McLean	Monica Walker			2014 USWCC (4th)
2014–15	Aileen Sormunen	Tara Peterson	Vicky Persinger	Monica Walker	Becca Hamilton (WWCC)	Scott Baird	2015 USWCC (bronze); 2015 WWCC (10th)
2015–16	Nina Roth	Aileen Sormunen	Monica Walker	Vicky Persinger			2016 USWCC (silver)
2016–17	Nina Roth	Tabitha Peterson	Aileen Geving	Becca Hamilton	Cory Christensen(WWCC)	Ann Swisshelm	2017 USWCC (silver); 2017 WWCC (5th)
2017–18	Nina Roth	Tabitha Peterson	Aileen Geving	Becca Hamilton	Cory Christensen(OG)	Al Hackner	2017 USOCT (gold); 2018 WOG (8th); 2018 Cont. Cup
2018–19	Nina Roth	Tabitha Peterson	Aileen Geving	Becca Hamilton	Tara Peterson	Howard Restall	
2019–20	Tabitha Peterson	Becca Hamilton	Tara Peterson	Aileen Geving	Nina Roth	Natalie Nicholson	2020 USWCC (gold)
2020–21	Tabitha Peterson	Nina Roth	Becca Hamilton	Tara Peterson	Aileen Geving	Laine Peters	2021 WWCC (bronze)
2021–22	Tabitha Peterson	Nina Roth	Becca Hamilton	Tara Peterson	Aileen Geving	Laine Peters, Phill Drobnick	2021 USOCT (gold); 2022 WOG (6th)
2024–25	Aileen Geving (Fourth)	Courtney Benson (Skip)	Lexi Daly	Sara Olson			
