= Barbara Perrella =

American curler

- Curler ♀
- Other names: Barb Polski

Team
- Curling club: St Paul CC, Saint Paul

Curling career
- Member Association: Minnesota
- World Championship: 3 (1986, 1999, 2004)
Medal record
Curling
Representing United States
World Championships
Silver medal – second place	1999 Saint John
United States Women's Championship
Gold medal – first place	1986 Chicago
Silver medal – second place	1987 St. Paul

Barbara "Barb" Perrella (born as Barbara Polski) is an American curler.

Perrella first curled in a physical education class at Bemidji State University. However, she grew up listening to her father and brothers talk about curling strategy around the kitchen table.

She is a 1999 World silver medallist.

== Teams ==
Season	Skip	Third	Second	Lead	Alternate	Coach	Events
1985–86	Geraldine Tilden	Linda Barneson	Barb Polski	Barb Gutzmer			1986 USWCC (gold); 1986 WWCC (7th)
1986–87	Barb Polski	Margie Smith	Sally Barry	Julie Carlson			1987 USWCC (silver)
1990–91	Margie Smith	Barb Polski	Lori Fisher	Sally Barry			1991 USWCC (???th)
1992–93	Barb Perrella	Karen Leksell	Linda Christensen	Cyndee Johnson			1993 USWCC (???th)
1994–95	Barb Perrella	Karen Leksell	Cyndee Johnson	Linda Christensen			1995 USWCC (???th)
1995–96	Barb Perrella	Karen Leksell	Cyndee Johnson	Linda Christensen			1996 USWCC (???th)
1998–99	Patti Lank	Erika Brown	Allison Darragh	Tracy Sachtjen	Barb Perrella	Steve Brown	1999 WWCC (silver)
2000–01	Shellan Reed	Barb Perrella	Patti Luke	Pam Cavers			2001 USWCC(4th)
2003–04	Patti Lank	Erika Brown	Nicole Joraanstad	Natalie Nicholson	Barb Perrella	Steve Brown	2004 WWCC (4th)
