= 2011 United States Women's Curling Championship =

- Host city: Fargo, North Dakota
- Arena: Scheels Arena
- Dates: February 12–19, 2011
- Winner: (New York (state)) Patti Lank
- Curling club: Lewiston, New York
- Skip: Patti Lank
- Third: Caitlin Maroldo
- Second: Jessica Schultz
- Lead: Mackenzie Lank
- Alternate: Christina Schwartz
- Finalist: (Minnesota) Allison Pottinger

The 2011 United States Women's Curling Championship took place on February 12–19 at the Scheels Arena in Fargo, North Dakota. It was held in conjunction with the 2011 United States Men's Curling Championship. After winning the final over the Allison Pottinger rink, the Patti Lank rink represented the United States at the 2011 World Championships at Esbjerg, Denmark, finishing in 7th place with a 4–5 win–loss record.

== Road to the Nationals ==
Teams qualified for the women's nationals in one of two ways. Two teams automatically qualified as the top two US teams on the Order of Merit list after the Curl Mesabi Cash Spiel is completed. This year, those two teams were the Erika Brown and Allison Pottinger rinks. Teams could also qualify for the women's nationals through a challenge round.

=== Challenge round ===
The women's challenge round was held on January 19–23 in Grand Forks, North Dakota. There were eleven teams (excluding the two teams qualified based on Order of Merit) participating in the challenge round for eight spots in the nationals in Fargo. In accordance with the rules set forth in the 2010-2011 USCA rules booklet, the challenge round consisted of a divisional round robin with two divisions. There was also a double knockout provision, where a team must have two losses in their win–loss record in order to be eliminated from qualifying for the nationals. Teams played tiebreakers to narrow down the number of qualifiable teams to the number of qualifier spots available.

The divisional round robin consisted of two divisions (listed by seed in Results section) of 6 and 5, respectively. At the end of play, all teams except the bottom two teams in each division advanced to the nationals. The bottom four teams then played in a single-knockout playoff to decide the winner of the last qualification spot. The double knockout provision applies in that a winless team will not be able to advance to the nationals.

==== Teams ====
Div.	Skip	Locale
A	Jenna Haag	(Wisconsin) Milton
A	Christine Haase	(Massachusetts) Wayland
A	Patti Lank	(New York (state)) Lewiston
A	Norma O'Leary	(Minnesota) Duluth
A	Amanda Tucker	(North Dakota) St. Thomas
A	Kimberly Wapola	(Minnesota) St. Paul
B	Em Good	(Washington (state)) Seattle
B	Lori Karst	(Wisconsin) Madison
B	Cassandra Potter	(Minnesota) St. Paul
B	Nicole Reiser	(North Dakota) Bismarck
B	Aileen Sormunen	(Minnesota) St. Paul

==== Results ====
Key
Teams to Nationals (Fargo)

Division A

Seed	Berth	Lank	O'Le.	Haase	Haag	Wap.	Tuck.	W	L
1	(New York (state)) Patti Lank		–	10-9	6-5	10-2	11-3	4	0
2	(New York (state)) Norma O'Leary	–		6-5	11-1	11-7	8-7	4	0
3	(Massachusetts) Christine Haase	9-10	5-6		–	9-8	8-3	2	2
5	(Wisconsin) Jenna Haag	5-6	1-11	–		10-7	6-4	2	2
4	(Minnesota) Kimberly Wapola	2-10	7-11	8-9	7-10		11-9	1	4
6	(North Dakota) Amanda Tucker	3-11	7-8	3-8	4-6	9-11		0	5

Division B

Seed	Berth	Sorm.	Reis.	Pott.	Karst	Good	W	L
1	(Minnesota) Aileen Sormunen		10-3	–	7-6	8-3	3	0
5	(North Dakota) Nicole Reiser	3-10		7-5	10-5	10-4	3	1
2	(Minnesota) Cassandra Potter	–	5-7		8-3	8-6	2	1
3	(Wisconsin) Lori Karst	6-7	5-10	3-8		7-3	1	3
4	(Washington (state)) Em Good	3-8	4-10	6-8	3-7		0	4

Qualification
B3	(Wisconsin) Lori Karst	10
A4	(Minnesota) Kimberly Wapola	7

== Nationals ==
=== Teams ===
Skip	Third	Second	Lead	Alternate	Locale	Qualification Method
Erika Brown	Nina Spatola	Ann Swisshelm	Laura Hallisey	Debbie McCormick	(Wisconsin) Madison	Top 1 US Order of Merit
Allison Pottinger	Nicole Joraanstad	Natalie Nicholson	Tabitha Peterson		(Minnesota) St. Paul	Top 2 US Order of Merit
Patti Lank	Caitlin Maroldo	Jessica Schultz	Mackenzie Lank	Christina Schwartz	(New York (state)) Lewiston	Challenge Round (Division A)
Norma O'Leary	Marjorie Smith	Theresa Hoffoss	Patricia Luke		(Minnesota) Duluth	Challenge Round (Division A)
Chrissy Haase	Monica Walker	Karen Walker	Nicole Vassar		(Massachusetts) Wayland	Challenge Round (Division A)
Jenna Haag	Chloe Pahl	Grace Gabower	Erin Wallace	Joy Pahl	(Wisconsin) Milton	Challenge Round (Division A)
Aileen Sormunen	Courtney George	Amanda McLean	Miranda Solem		(Minnesota) St. Paul	Challenge Round (Division B)
Cassie Potter	Jamie Haskell	Maureen Stolt	Stephanie Sambor		(Minnesota) St. Paul	Challenge Round (Division B)
Nicole Reiser	Michelle Wagner	Gabrielle Coleman	Ann Drummie	Charrissa Lin	(North Dakota) Bismarck	Challenge Round (Division B)
Lori Karst	Sherri Schummer	Emilia Juocys	Heather Van Sistine		(Wisconsin) Madison	Challenge Round (A/B Qualifier)

=== Standings ===
Through Draw 9

Team (Skip)	W	L	PF	PA	Ends Won	Ends Lost	Blank Ends	Stolen Ends
(New York (state)) Patti Lank	8	1	70	52	39	36	3	12
(Minnesota) Allison Pottinger	7	2	70	43	45	28	3	20
(Wisconsin) Erika Brown	7	2	81	47	39	30	3	9
(Minnesota) Cassandra Potter	6	3	67	58	38	33	5	12
(South Dakota) Nicole Reiser	4	5	63	69	39	42	3	13
(Minnesota) Aileen Sormunen	4	5	57	60	40	36	6	13
(Wisconsin) Jenna Haaag	3	6	41	55	34	37	7	5
(Minnesota) Norma O'Leary	3	6	60	65	31	40	8	6
(Massachusetts) Chris Haase	2	7	51	67	33	40	3	7
(Wisconsin) Lori Karsty	1	8	39	83	28	42	3	5

=== Round robin ===
All times listed in Central Standard Time.

==== Draw 1 ====
Saturday, February 12, 4:30 pm

Sheet A	1	2	3	4	5	6	7	8	9	10	Final
(Wisconsin) Jenna Haag	0	1	0	0	0	0	X	X	X	X	1
(Minnesota) Allison Pottinger	3	0	1	1	1	1	X	X	X	X	7

Sheet B	1	2	3	4	5	6	7	8	9	10	Final
(Minnesota) Norma O'Leary	0	1	5	0	4	3	X	X	X	X	13
(Minnesota) Cassie Potter	1	0	0	1	0	0	X	X	X	X	2

Sheet C	1	2	3	4	5	6	7	8	9	10	Final
(Minnesota) Aileen Sormunen	2	2	2	0	1	0	0	0	0	1	8
(North Dakota) Nicole Reiser	0	0	0	2	0	1	2	1	1	0	7

Sheet D	1	2	3	4	5	6	7	8	9	10	Final
(Wisconsin) Erika Brown	5	2	3	0	4	2	0	X	X	X	16
(Wisconsin) Lori Karst	0	0	0	0	0	0	1	X	X	X	1

Sheet E	1	2	3	4	5	6	7	8	9	10	Final
(Massachusetts) Chrissy Haase	1	1	0	0	2	0	0	X	X	X	4
(New York (state)) Patti Lank	0	0	3	1	0	0	7	X	X	X	11

==== Draw 2 ====
Sunday, February 13, 8:00 am

Sheet A	1	2	3	4	5	6	7	8	9	10	Final
(New York (state)) Patti Lank	2	1	0	2	0	2	0	0	1	1	9
(North Dakota) Nicole Reiser	0	0	1	0	1	0	1	1	0	0	4

Sheet B	1	2	3	4	5	6	7	8	9	10	Final
(Massachusetts) Chrissy Haase	1	0	3	0	0	0	0	0	X	X	4
(Minnesota) Allison Pottinger	0	2	0	1	1	2	1	2	X	X	9

Sheet C	1	2	3	4	5	6	7	8	9	10	Final
(Wisconsin) Lori Karst	1	0	0	0	1	0	0	0	2	X	4
(Minnesota) Cassie Potter	0	2	1	1	0	0	1	3	0	X	8

Sheet D	1	2	3	4	5	6	7	8	9	10	11	Final
(Minnesota) Aileen Sormunen	0	1	1	0	0	1	1	0	3	0	0	7
(Minnesota) Norma O'Leary	0	0	0	0	2	0	0	3	0	2	1	8

Sheet E	1	2	3	4	5	6	7	8	9	10	Final
(Wisconsin) Erika Brown	0	2	0	1	0	0	2	0	1	1	7
(Wisconsin) Jenna Haag	0	0	1	0	0	1	0	1	0	0	3

==== Draw 3 ====
Sunday, February 13, 4:00 pm

Sheet A	1	2	3	4	5	6	7	8	9	10	Final
(Minnesota) Aileen Sormunen	0	0	0	1	0	2	0	2	0	X	5
(Minnesota) Cassie Potter	4	1	0	0	2	0	1	0	1	X	9

Sheet B	1	2	3	4	5	6	7	8	9	10	Final
(North Dakota) Nicole Reiser	1	0	1	0	1	0	0	1	3	X	7
(Wisconsin) Erika Brown	0	1	0	1	0	2	0	0	0	X	4

Sheet C	1	2	3	4	5	6	7	8	9	10	Final
(Minnesota) Norma O'Leary	0	0	1	0	0	2	0	1	0	0	4
(New York (state)) Patti Lank	0	0	0	1	1	0	2	0	0	1	5

Sheet D	1	2	3	4	5	6	7	8	9	10	Final
(Massachusetts) Chrissy Haase	0	1	0	1	2	0	1	0	2	0	7
(Wisconsin) Jenna Haag	2	0	1	0	0	1	0	2	0	2	8

Sheet E	1	2	3	4	5	6	7	8	9	10	Final
(Wisconsin) Lori Karst	1	0	1	0	0	0	0	0	X	X	2
(Minnesota) Allison Pottinger	0	1	0	1	2	1	2	1	X	X	8

==== Draw 4 ====
Monday, February 14, 8:00 am

Sheet A	1	2	3	4	5	6	7	8	9	10	Final
(Minnesota) Allison Pottinger	1	0	0	1	1	1	0	3	0	X	7
(Minnesota) Norma O'Leary	0	0	0	0	0	0	2	0	1	X	3

Sheet B	1	2	3	4	5	6	7	8	9	10	Final
(Wisconsin) Jenna Haag	2	0	1	0	2	0	0	0	2	0	7
(Wisconsin) Lori Karst	0	2	0	1	0	1	0	0	0	2	6

Sheet C	1	2	3	4	5	6	7	8	9	10	Final
(Massachusetts) Chrissy Haase	1	0	0	2	0	0	0	2	0	X	5
(Wisconsin) Erika Brown	0	2	1	0	3	0	0	0	1	X	7

Sheet D	1	2	3	4	5	6	7	8	9	10	Final
(North Dakota) Nicole Reiser	0	1	0	2	0	1	0	0	0	X	4
(Minnesota) Cassie Potter	2	0	2	0	1	0	2	1	1	X	9

Sheet E	1	2	3	4	5	6	7	8	9	10	Final
(New York (state)) Patti Lank	2	0	0	0	3	0	2	1	1	X	9
(Minnesota) Aileen Sormunen	0	0	3	2	0	1	0	0	0	X	6

==== Draw 5 ====
Monday, February 14, 4:00 pm

Sheet A	1	2	3	4	5	6	7	8	9	10	Final
(Wisconsin) Lori Karst	1	0	1	0	1	0	0	X	X	X	3
(Minnesota) Aileen Sormunen	0	2	0	4	0	3	2	X	X	X	11

Sheet B	1	2	3	4	5	6	7	8	9	10	Final
(Wisconsin) Erika Brown	3	0	2	0	2	0	4	0	X	X	11
(Minnesota) Norma O'Leary	0	2	0	1	0	2	0	2	X	X	7

Sheet C	1	2	3	4	5	6	7	8	9	10	Final
(North Dakota) Nicole Reiser	0	0	0	0	3	1	0	2	0	4	10
(Wisconsin) Jenna Haag	0	1	0	2	0	0	1	0	1	0	5

Sheet D	1	2	3	4	5	6	7	8	9	10	Final
(Minnesota) Allison Pottinger	0	1	0	1	0	4	0	1	1	0	8
(New York (state)) Patti Lank	2	0	1	0	2	0	3	0	0	1	9

Sheet E	1	2	3	4	5	6	7	8	9	10	Final
(Minnesota) Cassie Potter	0	0	4	0	1	0	3	X	X	X	8
(Massachusetts) Chrissy Haase	1	0	0	0	0	1	0	X	X	X	2

==== Draw 6 ====
Tuesday, February 15, 10:00 am

Sheet A	1	2	3	4	5	6	7	8	9	10	Final
(North Dakota) Nicole Reiser	0	0	2	0	2	0	1	1	1	2	9
(Massachusetts) Chrissy Haase	1	1	0	2	0	3	0	0	0	0	7

Sheet B	1	2	3	4	5	6	7	8	9	10	Final
(New York (state)) Patti Lank	0	3	0	0	1	0	2	0	1	X	7
(Wisconsin) Jenna Haag	0	0	1	1	0	1	0	1	0	X	4

Sheet C	1	2	3	4	5	6	7	8	9	10	Final
(Minnesota) Allison Pottinger	2	0	1	0	0	2	0	4	0	1	10
(Minnesota) Aileen Sormunen	0	1	0	1	1	0	2	0	4	0	9

Sheet D	1	2	3	4	5	6	7	8	9	10	Final
(Minnesota) Cassie Potter	0	0	2	0	3	0	3	0	2	0	10
(Wisconsin) Erika Brown	0	5	0	1	0	2	0	3	0	1	12

Sheet E	1	2	3	4	5	6	7	8	9	10	Final
(Minnesota) Norma O'Leary	4	0	0	0	0	2	0	0	0	0	6
(Wisconsin) Lori Karst	0	1	0	1	3	0	0	2	0	1	8

==== Draw 7 ====
Tuesday, February 15, 7:00 pm

Sheet A	1	2	3	4	5	6	7	8	9	10	Final
(Minnesota) Cassie Potter	0	0	0	1	0	3	0	3	0	0	7
(Wisconsin) Jenna Haag	1	0	0	0	2	0	1	0	1	1	6

Sheet B	1	2	3	4	5	6	7	8	9	10	Final
(Minnesota) Allison Pottinger	2	0	2	1	4	0	0	1	X	X	10
(North Dakota) Nicole Reiser	0	1	0	0	0	2	0	0	X	X	3

Sheet C	1	2	3	4	5	6	7	8	9	10	Final
(New York (state)) Patti Lank	0	0	2	0	4	0	1	1	1	X	9
(Wisconsin) Lori Karst	2	2	0	1	0	0	0	0	0	X	5

Sheet D	1	2	3	4	5	6	7	8	9	10	Final
(Minnesota) Norma O'Leary	0	1	0	2	0	0	0	1	X	X	4
(Massachusetts) Chrissy Haase	1	0	2	0	1	2	3	0	X	X	9

Sheet E	1	2	3	4	5	6	7	8	9	10	Final
(Minnesota) Aileen Sormunen	0	1	0	1	0	1	0	1	X	X	4
(Wisconsin) Erika Brown	0	0	2	0	2	0	5	0	X	X	9

==== Draw 8 ====
Wednesday, February 16, 12:00 pm

Sheet A	1	2	3	4	5	6	7	8	9	10	Final
(Wisconsin) Erika Brown	1	1	1	0	2	0	3	2	X	X	10
(New York (state)) Patti Lank	0	0	0	1	0	2	0	0	X	X	3

Sheet B	1	2	3	4	5	6	7	8	9	10	Final
(Minnesota) Aileen Sormunen	0	0	0	1	1	1	1	0	2	1	7
(Massachusetts) Chrissy Haase	1	1	1	0	0	0	0	2	0	0	5

Sheet C	1	2	3	4	5	6	7	8	9	10	Final
(Wisconsin) Jenna Haag	1	0	0	1	0	1	1	3	0	X	7
(Minnesota) Norma O'Leary	0	1	0	0	0	0	0	0	1	X	4

Sheet D	1	2	3	4	5	6	7	8	9	10	Final
(Wisconsin) Lori Karst	0	0	2	0	0	2	0	0	2	0	6
(North Dakota) Nicole Reiser	0	2	0	1	1	0	2	1	0	3	10

Sheet E	1	2	3	4	5	6	7	8	9	10	Final
(Minnesota) Allison Pottinger	1	0	1	0	0	2	0	0	0	X	4
(Minnesota) Cassie Potter	0	2	0	2	0	0	1	1	1	X	7

==== Draw 9 ====
Wednesday, February 16, 8:00 pm

Sheet A	1	2	3	4	5	6	7	8	9	10	Final
(Massachusetts) Chrissy Haase	1	0	2	0	1	0	3	0	1	X	8
(Wisconsin) Lori Karst	0	1	0	1	0	1	0	1	0	X	4

Sheet B	1	2	3	4	5	6	7	8	9	10	Final
(Minnesota) Cassie Potter	0	1	1	0	0	2	2	0	1	0	7
(New York (state)) Patti Lank	2	0	0	1	2	0	0	2	0	1	8

Sheet C	1	2	3	4	5	6	7	8	9	10	Final
(Wisconsin) Erika Brown	0	0	1	0	2	0	1	0	1	X	5
(Minnesota) Allison Pottinger	2	1	0	3	0	0	0	1	0	X	7

Sheet D	1	2	3	4	5	6	7	8	9	10	Final
(Wisconsin) Jenna Haag	0	2	0	0	0	1	0	0	0	X	3
(Minnesota) Aileen Sormunen	0	0	2	1	0	0	1	2	1	X	7

Sheet E	1	2	3	4	5	6	7	8	9	10	11	Final
(North Dakota) Nicole Reiser	0	2	1	0	4	0	2	0	0	0	0	9
(Minnesota) Norma O'Leary	1	0	0	2	0	1	0	2	2	1	2	11

=== Playoffs ===
Page playoff system
1	(New York (state)) Patti Lank	6
2	(Minnesota) Allison Pottinger	5
3	(Wisconsin) Erika Brown	4
4	(Minnesota) Cassandra Potter	9

Semifinal
2	(Minnesota) Allison Pottinger	8
4	(Minnesota) Cassandra Potter	5

Final
1	(New York (state)) Patti Lank	9
2	(Minnesota) Allison Pottinger	4

==== 1 vs. 2 game ====
Thursday, February 17, 8:00 pm

Team	1	2	3	4	5	6	7	8	9	10	Final
(New York (state)) Patti Lank	0	1	0	0	0	1	0	3	0	1	6
(Minnesota) Allison Pottinger	0	0	2	1	0	0	1	0	1	0	5

==== 3 vs. 4 game ====
Thursday, February 17, 8:00 pm

Team	1	2	3	4	5	6	7	8	9	10	Final
(Wisconsin) Erika Brown	0	2	0	0	0	0	1	1	0	X	4
(Minnesota) Cassandra Potter	1	0	0	0	2	2	0	0	4	X	9

==== Semifinal ====
Friday, February 18, 4:00 pm

Team	1	2	3	4	5	6	7	8	9	10	Final
(Minnesota) Allison Pottinger	1	1	0	1	0	2	0	2	0	1	8
(Minnesota) Cassandra Potter	0	0	1	0	1	0	3	0	0	0	5

==== Championship final ====
Saturday, February 19, 10:00 am

In the final of the women's championship, Lank opened up the game with a light tap for a deuce, and then stole a point in the second after Pottinger's takeout left one of Lank's stones closer to the button than her stone was. Pottinger drew against four to pick up a single in the third, but Lank drew to the button to score another deuce and take a commanding four-point lead. A failed double takeout by Lank left Pottinger with an easy draw for two, cutting Lank's lead to two points. After the break, Lank scored a big three points after Pottinger's failed takeout attempt gave Lank an easy draw. Lank stole another point from Pottinger when Pottinger's takeout didn't push one of Lank's stones out far enough. After coming up light to only take a single in the eighth end, Pottinger conceded the game, and Lank won the championship.

Team	1	2	3	4	5	6	7	8	9	10	Final
(New York (state)) Patti Lank	2	1	0	2	0	3	1	0	X	X	9
(Minnesota) Allison Pottinger	0	0	1	0	2	0	0	1	X	X	4
