= Geraldine Tilden =

American curler

- Curler ♀
- Other names: Gerri

Team
- Curling club: St Paul CC, Saint Paul

Curling career
- Member Association: Minnesota
- World Championship: 1 (1986)
Medal record
Curling
Representing United States
United States Women's Championship
Gold medal – first place	1986 Chicago

Geraldine "Gerri" Tilden is an American curler.

At the national level, she is a United States women's champion curler (1986).

== Teams ==
Season	Skip	Third	Second	Lead	Events
1977–78	Marsha Hulstrand	Gerri Tilden	Sylvia Hesse	Lyn Korngable	
1978–79	Marsha Hulstrand	Gerri Tilden	Sylvia Hesse	Debbie Dexter	
1980–81	Marsha Hulstrand	Gerri Tilden	Linda Barneson	Sylvia Hesse	
1981–82	Marsha Hulstrand	Gerri Tilden	Linda Barneson	Sylvia Hesse	
1982–83	Gerri Tilden	Linda Barneson	Molly Jytyla	Nancy Johnson	
1984–85	Gerri Tilden	Linda Barneson	Sally Barry	Nancy Bodmer	
1985–86	Geraldine Tilden	Linda Barneson	Barb Polski	Barb Gutzmer	1986 USWCC (gold); 1986 WWCC (7th)
