= United States Women's Curling Championship =

American curling championship

- Established: 1977
- 2026 host city: Charlotte, North Carolina
- 2026 arena: Bojangles Coliseum
- 2026 champion: (Michigan) Delaney Strouse

Current edition
- 2026 United States Women's Curling Championship

The United States Women's Curling Championship is the annual women's national curling championship for the United States. It is run by the United States Curling Association (USCA) and typically held in conjunction with the Men's Curling Championship. The champions are eligible to represent the United States at the World Women's Curling Championships if they also rank in the top 75 teams over the last two seasons in the World Curling Tour Order of Merit or have earned 40 points in the Order of Merit year-to-date rankings.

== History ==
The 2021 Championship was originally planned to be held February 6–13 at the ImOn Ice Arena in Cedar Rapids, Iowa, and it would have been the first time the Women's National Championship was held in Iowa. But in August, 2020 the arena was damaged during a severe derecho storm. The ongoing COVID-19 pandemic caused delays in repairing the arena and in November, 2020 the USCA announced that an alternative host site would be found. Only a month later, the USCA announced another change to the 2021 Championship when they declared that all remaining 2020–21 events would be either cancelled or postponed until late spring 2021. This postponement delayed the Women's National Championship until after the 2021 World Women's Championship and so the 2020 champions, Tabitha Peterson's team, were selected to represent the United States. This gave the team the opportunity to compete at Worlds which they missed the previous year when the 2020 World Women's Championship was cancelled due to the COVID-19 pandemic. On March 29, 2021 it was announced that the 2021 Women's Championship will be held in conjunction with the Men's Nationals and Mixed Doubles Nationals in a bio-secure bubble at Wausau Curling Club in Wausau, Wisconsin in May, 2021.

== Qualification ==
The qualification methods and format of the championship has changed over time, but currently eight teams play in each championship. Four spots are awarded to the top American teams in the World Curling Federation (WCF) World Team Ranking System at a particular date roughly two months out from the championship. Three spots are awarded to the top teams from a Challenge Round, open to all United States curlers. The final spot is awarded to a team from that year's Junior Championships, selected by the USCA.

For the 2021 Championship the qualification methods were modified slightly due to impacts of the COVID-19 pandemic. The field of eight teams included the 2020 champion and runner-up, the top three teams in the WCF World Team Ranking System on September 1, 2020, and the top three teams from the Challenge Round.

== Format ==
The current format begins with a complete round robin where each team plays every other team. The playoff format depends on the rankings at the end of the round robin. If one team finishes the round robin at least one win ahead of the other teams then that team advances directly to the final and faces the winner of a game between the 2nd and 3rd ranked teams. If two or three teams are tied for first place after the round robin then the top three teams play a version of a page playoff. The 1st and 2nd ranked teams play each other with the winner advancing to the championship game. The loser of the 1st vs 2nd game plays the 3rd place team with the winner of this game advancing to the championship game. If four teams are tied for first place after the round robin then all four advance to a single elimination style playoff. The 1st ranked team plays the 4th while the 2nd ranked team plays the 3rd. The winners of these two games play in the championship.

== Past champions ==
The site and winner of every women's national championship since it began in 1977:

Year	Site	Winning club	Skip	Third	Second	Lead	Alternate	Finish at Worlds^{1}
1977	Wilmette, IL	(New York (state)) Hastings, NY	Margaret Smith	Cynthia Smith	Jackie Grant	Eve Switzer		
1978	Duluth, MN	(Wisconsin) Wausau, WI	Sandy Robarge	Elaine Collins	Jo Shannon	Virginia Morrison		
1979	Winchester, MA	(Washington (state)) Seattle, WA	Nancy Langley	Dolores Wallace	Leslie Frosch	Nancy Wallace		5th
1980	Seattle, WA	(Washington (state)) Seattle, WA	Sharon Kozai	Joan Fish	Betty Kozai	Aija Edwards		5th
1981	Kettle Moraine, WI	(Washington (state)) Seattle, WA	Nancy Langley	Carol Dahl	Leslie Frosch	Nancy Wallace		8th
1982	Bowling Green, OH	(Illinois) Oak Park, IL	Ruth Schwenker	Stephanie Flynn	Donna Purkey	Kathleen Wilson		8th
1983	Grafton, ND	(Washington (state)) Seattle, WA	Nancy Langley	Dolores Campbell	Nancy Wallace	Leslie Frosch		6th
1984	Wauwatosa, WI	(Minnesota) Duluth, MN	Amy Hatten	Terry Leksell	Karen Leksell	Kelly Sieger		9th
1985	Hershey, PA	(Alaska) Fairbanks, AK	Bev Birklid	Peggy Martin	Jerry Evans	Katrina Sharp		9th
1986	Chicago, IL	(Minnesota) St. Paul, MN	Gerri Tilden	Linda Barneson	Barb Polski	Barb Gutzmer		7th
1987	St. Paul, MN	(Washington (state)) Seattle, WA	Sharon Good	Joan Fish	Beth Bronger-Jones	Aija Edwards		5th
1988	Darien, CT	(Washington (state)) Seattle, WA	Nancy Langley	Nancy Pearson	Leslie Frosch	Mary Hobson		7th
1989	Detroit, MI	(North Dakota) Rolla, ND	Jan Lagasse	Janie Kakela	Cooky Bertsch	Eileen Mickelson		9th
1990	Superior, WI	(Colorado) Denver, CO	Bev Behnke	Dawna Bennett	Susan Anscheutz	Pam Finch		8th
1991	Utica, NY	(Texas) Houston, TX	Maymar Gemmell	Judy Johnston	Janet Hunter	Brenda Jancic		9th
1992	Grafton, ND	(Wisconsin) Madison, WI	Lisa Schoeneberg	Amy Wright	Lori Mountford	Jill Jones		Silver
1993	St. Paul, MN	(Colorado) Denver, CO	Bev Behnke	Dawna Bennett	Susan Anscheutz	Pam Finch		8th
1994	Duluth, MN	(Colorado) Denver, CO	Bev Behnke	Dawna Bennett	Susan Anscheutz	Pam Finch		6th
1995	Appleton, WI	(Wisconsin) Madison, WI	Lisa Schoeneberg	Erika Brown	Lori Mountford	Marcia Tillisch	Allison Darragh	5th
1996	Bemidji, MN	(Wisconsin) Madison, WI	Lisa Schoeneberg	Erika Brown	Lori Mountford	Allison Darragh	Debbie McCormick	Silver
1997	Seattle, WA	(Wisconsin) Arlington, WI	Patti Lank	Analissa Johnson	Joni Cotten	Tracy Sachtjen		6th
1998	Bismarck, ND	(Illinois) Wilmette, IL	Kari Erickson	Lori Kreklau	Stacey Liapis	Ann Swisshelm	Risa O'Connell	8th
1999	Duluth, MN	(Wisconsin) Madison, WI	Patti Lank	Erika Brown	Allison Darragh	Tracy Sachtjen		Silver
2000	Ogden, UT	(Nebraska) Omaha, NE	Amy Wright	Amy Becher	Joni Cotten	Natalie Simenson	Corina Marquardt	6th
2001	Madison, WI	(Illinois) Highland Park, IL	Kari Erickson	Debbie McCormick	Stacey Liapis	Ann Swisshelm		5th
2002	Eveleth, MN	(Wisconsin) Madison, WI	Patti Lank	Erika Brown	Allison Pottinger	Natalie Nicholson	Nicole Joraanstad	7th
2003	Utica, NY	(Illinois) Chicago, IL	Debbie McCormick	Allison Pottinger	Ann Swisshelm Silver	Tracy Sachtjen		Gold
2004	Grand Forks, ND	(Wisconsin) Madison, WI	Patti Lank	Erika Brown	Nicole Joraanstad	Natalie Nicholson		4th
2005	Madison, WI	(Minnesota) Bemidji, MN	Cassie Johnson	Jamie Johnson	Jessica Schultz	Maureen Brunt		Silver
2006	Bemidji, MN	(Wisconsin) Madison, WI	Debbie McCormick	Allison Pottinger	Nicole Joraanstad	Natalie Nicholson		Silver
2007	Utica, NY	(Wisconsin) Madison, WI	Debbie McCormick	Allison Pottinger	Nicole Joraanstad	Natalie Nicholson		4th
2008	Hibbing, MN	(Wisconsin) Madison, WI	Debbie McCormick	Allison Pottinger	Nicole Joraanstad	Natalie Nicholson		7th
2009	Broomfield, CO	(Wisconsin) Madison, WI	Debbie McCormick	Allison Pottinger	Nicole Joraanstad	Natalie Nicholson		9th
2010	Kalamazoo, MI	(Wisconsin) Madison, WI	Erika Brown	Nina Spatola	Ann Swisshelm	Laura Hallisey		5th
2011	Fargo, ND	(New York (state)) Lewiston, NY	Patti Lank	Caitlin Maroldo	Jessica Schultz	Mackenzie Lank		7th
2012	Philadelphia, PA	(Minnesota) St. Paul, MN	Allison Pottinger	Nicole Joraanstad	Natalie Nicholson	Tabitha Peterson		5th
2013	Green Bay, WI	(Wisconsin) Madison, WI	Erika Brown	Debbie McCormick	Jessica Schultz	Ann Swisshelm		4th
2014	Philadelphia, PA	(Wisconsin) Madison, WI	Nina Spatola	Becca Hamilton	Tara Peterson	Sophie Brorson		6th (Allison Pottinger)
2015	Kalamazoo, MI	(Wisconsin) Madison, WI	Erika Brown	Alex Carlson	Becca Funk	Kendall Behm		10th (Aileen Sormunen)
2016	Jacksonville, FL	(Wisconsin) Madison, WI	Erika Brown	Allison Pottinger	Nicole Joraanstad	Natalie Nicholson		6th
2017	Everett, WA	(Minnesota) Blaine, MN	Jamie Sinclair	Alexandra Carlson	Vicky Persinger	Monica Walker		5th (Nina Roth)
2018	Fargo, ND	(Minnesota) Blaine, MN	Jamie Sinclair	Alexandra Carlson	Vicky Persinger	Monica Walker		4th
2019	Kalamazoo, MI	(Minnesota) Chaska, MN	Jamie Sinclair	Sarah Anderson	Taylor Anderson	Monica Walker		7th
2020	Cheney, WA	(Minnesota) St. Paul, MN	Tabitha Peterson	Becca Hamilton	Tara Peterson	Aileen Geving		3rd (2021)^{2}
2021	Wausau, WI	(Minnesota) Chaska, MN	Cory Christensen	Sarah Anderson	Vicky Persinger	Taylor Anderson		5th (2022) ^{3}
2023	Denver, CO	(Minnesota) Chaska, MN	Tabitha Peterson	Cory Thiesse	Becca Hamilton	Tara Peterson		7th
2024	East Rutherford, NJ	(Minnesota) St. Paul, MN	Tabitha Peterson	Cory Thiesse	Tara Peterson	Becca Hamilton		7th
2025	Duluth, MN	(Minnesota) St. Paul, MN	Tabitha Peterson	Cory Thiesse	Tara Peterson	Taylor Anderson-Heide	Vicky Persinger	12th
2026	Charlotte, NC	(Michigan) Traverse City, MI	Delaney Strouse	Anne O'Hara	Sydney Mullaney	Madison Bear		

Notes

1. This column shows the results of the team representing the United States at the World Curling Championships. Based on the rules implemented by the United States Curling Association for the 2013–14 season, the United States team at the World Curling Championships is not necessarily the team that won the national championship. Beginning in 2018, the winner will once again represent the US at the World Championships, provided they have a high enough ranking on the World Curling Tour.
2. 2020 World Women's Curling Championship was cancelled due to the COVID-19 pandemic The 2020 Champions represented the US at the 2021 World Women's Curling Championship.
3. The 2022 US Championship was cancelled due to the COVID-19 pandemic. The 2021 Champions represented the US at the 2022 World Women's Curling Championship.

== Champions by state ==
(As of 2026)

Women's Curling Champions
15, 6, 5, 4, 3, 2, 1

Rank	State	Championships
1	Wisconsin	17
2	Minnesota	12
3	(Washington (state)) Washington	6
4	Illinois	4
5	Colorado	3
6	(New York (state)) New York	2
7	Alaska	1
7	Michigan	1
7	Nebraska	1
7	North Dakota	1
7	Texas	1

== Sportsmanship award ==
The Ann Brown Sportsmanship Award has been presented annually since 2007 to one male and one female athlete at the National Championships who are judged to best embody the USCA Spirit of Curling as voted on by their peers. The award is given in memory of Ann Brown, who was the first female president of the United States Curling Association and was the second female inductee into the USCA Hall of Fame.

Female recipients:
Year	Recipient
2007	Caitlin Maroldo
2008	Ann Swisshelm
2009	Laura Roessler
2010	Gabrielle Coleman
2011	Chrissy Haase
2012	Tara Peterson
2013	Sarah Anderson
2014	Theresa Hoffoss
2015	Kate Bert
2016	Katie Sigurdson
2017	Donna Umali
2018	Rebecca Andrew
2019	Kim Rhyme
2020	Ariel Traxler

== See also ==
- Scottish Women's Curling Championship
- Scotties Tournament of Hearts (Canada)
- United States Men's Curling Championship
