= Caitlin Pulli =

American curler

- Curler
- Other names: Caitlin Costello, Caitlin Maroldo
- Born: May 3, 1975 (age 51); Utica, New York, United States

Curling career
- Member Association: United States
- World Championship: 2 (2006, 2011)
- World Mixed Championship: 1 (2022)
Medal record
Curling
World Championships
Silver medal – second place	2006 Grande Prairie
United States Women's Championship
Gold medal – first place	2011 Fargo
Silver medal – second place	2006 Bemidji
Silver medal – second place	2008 Hibbing
Silver medal – second place	2009 Broomfield
Silver medal – second place	2010 Kalamazoo
Bronze medal – third place	2007 Utica
United States Olympic Curling Trials
Silver medal – second place	2009 Broomfield	Team

Caitlin Pulli (born May 3, 1975), also known as Caitlin Costello and Caitlin Maroldo, is an American curler. She was a silver medalist at the 2006 World Women's Championship.

== Curling career ==
Pulli started curling in 1988. She has competed at the United States Women's Championship fourteen times, earning a bronze medal once, four silver medals, and gold in 2011. She was the alternate for Debbie McCormick's team at the 2006 World Women's Championship, where they won the silver medal. Pulli was a longtime teammate for skip Patti Lank, including when they won the US title in 2011. Pulli and Lank, along with Jessica Schultz, and Mackenzie Lank, went through the 2011 Nationals round robin with an 8–1 record, then defeated Allison Pottinger in the final. They represented the US at the 2011 World Championship in Esbjerg, Denmark, where they finished seventh with a record of 6–5.

== Teams ==
=== Women's ===
Season	Skip	Third	Second	Lead	Alternate	Coach	Events
2000–01	Caitlin Costello	Chrissy Fink	Maureen Haase	Erlene Daley	Pam Montbach		2001 USWCC (6th)
2001–02	Caitlin Costello	Erlene Daley	Maureen Haase-Fodera	Chrissy Fink	Danielle O'Connor	Dave Fink	2002 USWCC (10th)
2003—04	Caitlin Maroldo	Chrissy Fink	Erlene Puleo	Maureen Fodera	Elizabeth Williams	Dave Fink	2004 USWCC (5th)
2004—05	Caitlin Maroldo	Chrissy Haase	Elizabeth Williams	Erlene Puleo	Katie Beck		2005 USWCC/USOCT (7th)
2005—06	Patti Lank	Caitlin Maroldo	Ann Swisshelm	Chrissy Haase			2006 USWCC (silver)
2005—06	Debbie McCormick	Allison Pottinger	Nicole Joraanstad	Natalie Nicholson	Caitlin Maroldo	Wally Henry	2006 WWCC (silver)
2006—07	Patti Lank	Erika Brown	Caitlin Maroldo	Chrissy Haase	Ann Swisshelm		2007 USWCC (bronze)
2007—08	Patti Lank	Caitlin Maroldo	Chrissy Haase	Ann Swisshelm	Erika Brown	Steve Brown	2008 USWCC (silver)
2008—09	Patti Lank	Caitlin Maroldo	Ann Swisshelm	Chrissy Haase			2009 USWCC/USOCT (silver)
2009—10	Patti Lank	Aileen Sormunen	Caitlin Maroldo	Jessica Schultz			2010 USWCC (silver)
2010—11	Patti Lank	Caitlin Maroldo	Jessica Schultz	Mackenzie Lank	Christina Schwartz (USWCC); Debbie McCormick (WWCC)	Neil Harrison	2011 USWCC (gold); 2011 WWCC (7th)
2011—12	Patti Lank	Nina Spatola	Caitlin Maroldo	Molly Bonner	Mackenzie Lank (USWCC)		2012 Cont. Cup (silver); 2012 USWCC (8th)
2012—13	Patti Lank	Mackenzie Lank	Nina Spatola	Caitlin Maroldo			2013 USWCC (5th)
2013—14	Caitlin Maroldo	Rebecca Andrew	Abigail Morrison	Emily Walker			2014 USWCC (7th)

=== Mixed ===
Season	Skip	Third	Second	Lead	Events
2017–18	Caitlin Maroldo	Jeff Pulli	Rebecca Andrew	Jason Scott	2018 USMxCC (4th)
2018–19	Caitlin Pulli	Jeff Pulli	Rebecca Andrew	Jason Scott	2019 USMxCC (silver)
2019-20	Caitlin Maroldo	Jeff Pulli	Emily Anderson	Jason Scott	
2021–22	Caitlin Pulli	Jeff Pulli	Rebecca Andrew	Jason Scott	2022 USMxCC (gold)
