= Natalie Nicholson =

American curler (born 1976)

- Curler
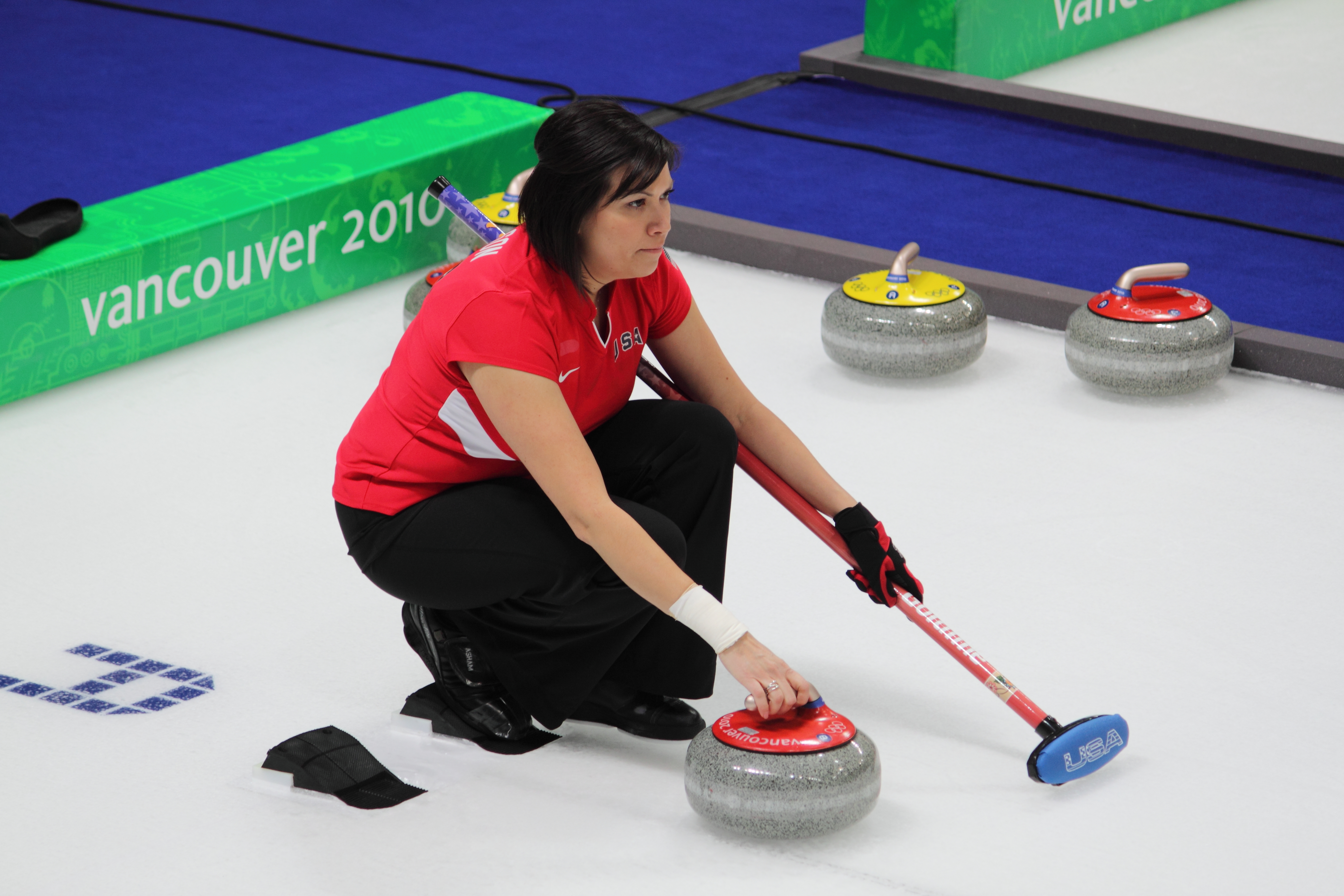
- Born: Natalie Simenson; March 10, 1976 (age 50); Bemidji, Minnesota, U.S.

Curling career
- World Championship: 10 (2000, 2002, 2004, 2006, 2007, 2008, 2009, 2012, 2014, 2016)
- Olympic: 1 (2010)
Medal record
World Curling Championships
Silver medal – second place	2006 Grande Prairie
United States Olympic Curling Trials
Gold medal – first place	2009 Broomfield	Team
Silver medal – second place	2013 Fargo	Team
Bronze medal – third place	2005 Madison
United States National Championships
Gold medal – first place	2000 Ogden
Gold medal – first place	2002 Eveleth
Gold medal – first place	2004 Grand Forks
Gold medal – first place	2006 Bemidji
Gold medal – first place	2007 Utica
Gold medal – first place	2008 Hibbing
Gold medal – first place	2009 Broomfield
Gold medal – first place	2012 Philadelphia
Gold medal – first place	2016 Jacksonville
Silver medal – second place	2011 Fargo
Silver medal – second place	2014 Philadelphia
Bronze medal – third place	2005 Madison
Bronze medal – third place	2013 Green Bay

Natalie Nicholson (born March 10, 1976, in Bemidji, Minnesota, as Natalie Simenson) is an American curler. She is currently the coach of the Tabitha Peterson rink.

== Career ==
She started curling in 1993 at the Bemidji Curling Club.

As a junior curler, Nicholson played second for Risa O'Connell and represented Team USA at the 1995 and 1997 World Junior Curling Championships finishing sixth and fourth respectively.

In 2000, Nicholson curled in her first World Curling Championships playing lead for Amy Wright and finished in sixth place. Nicholson returned to the Worlds in 2002 as Patti Lank's lead and finished in eighth place. They returned in 2004 finishing in fourth place.

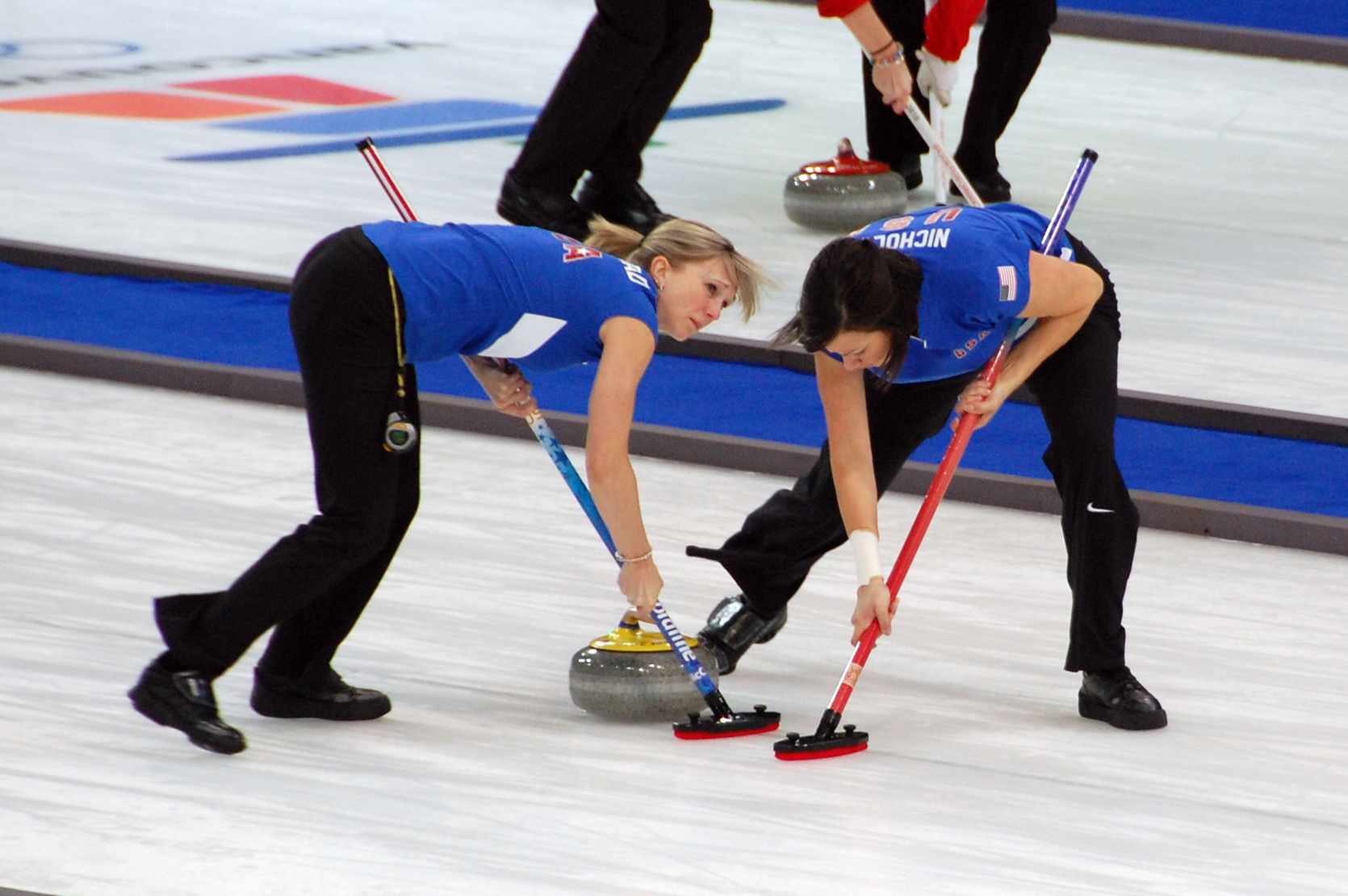
Nicholson, right, sweeping a stone with Nicole Joraanstad at the 2010 Winter Olympics

Nicholson would later move to play for Debbie McCormick's team and in 2006 Nicholson won her first international medal- a silver when USA lost to Sweden (skipped by Anette Norberg).

== Personal life ==
Nicholson is employed as a family nurse practitioner and lactation counselor. Nicholson is married and has two children.

== Teams ==
Season	Skip	Third	Second	Lead	Alternate	Coach	Events
1994–95	Risa O'Connell	Missi O'Connell	Natalie Simenson	Alison Naylor	Jennifer Herning		1995 USJCC (gold); 1995 WJCC (6th)
1996–97	Risa O'Connell	Amy Becher	Natalie Simenson	Missi O'Connell	Jennifer Herning		1997 USJCC (gold); 1997 WJCC (4th)
1998–99	Amy Wright	Amy Becher	Natalie Simenson	Joni Cotten			1999 USWCC (silver)
1999–00	Amy Wright	Amy Becher	Joni Cotten	Natalie Simenson	Corina Marquardt	Robert Fenson	2000 USWCC (gold); 2000 WWCC (6th)
2000–01	Amy Wright	Amy Becher	Nikki Baird	Natalie Nicholson	Joni Cotten	Bob Fenson	2001 USWCC (SF)
2001–02	Amy Wright	Amy Becher	Natalie Nicholson	Nikki Baird	Joni Cotten	Bob Fenson	2001 USOCT (4th)
2001–02	Patti Lank	Erika Brown	Allison Darragh	Natalie Nicholson	Nicole Joraanstad		2002 USWCC (gold); 2002 WWCC (8th)
2002–03	Patti Lank	Erika Brown	Nicole Joraanstad	Natalie Nicholson			2003 USWCC (silver)
2003–04	Patti Lank	Erika Brown	Nicole Joraanstad	Natalie Nicholson	Barb Perrella (WWCC)	Steve Brown	2004 USWCC (gold); 2004 WWCC (4th)
2004–05	Patti Lank	Erika Brown	Nicole Joraanstad	Natalie Nicholson		Matt Hames	2005 USWCC/USOCT (bronze)
2005–06	Debbie McCormick	Allison Pottinger	Nicole Joraanstad	Tracy Sachtjen	Natalie Nicholson	Joni Cotten	2006 USWCC (gold)
2005–06	Debbie McCormick	Allison Pottinger	Nicole Joraanstad	Natalie Nicholson	Caitlin Maroldo	Wally Henry	2006 WWCC (silver)
2006–07	Debbie McCormick	Allison Pottinger	Nicole Joraanstad	Natalie Nicholson	Tracy Sachtjen		2007 USWCC (gold)
2006–07	Debbie McCormick	Allison Pottinger	Nicole Joraanstad	Natalie Nicholson	Maureen Brunt	Wally Henry	2007 WWCC (4th)
2007–08	Debbie McCormick	Allison Pottinger	Nicole Joraanstad	Natalie Nicholson	Tracy Sachtjen (WWCC)	Wally Henry	2008 USWCC (gold); 2008 WWCC (7th)
2008–09	Debbie McCormick	Allison Pottinger	Nicole Joraanstad	Natalie Nicholson	Tracy Sachtjen	Wally Henry	2009 USWCC/USOCT (gold); 2009 WWCC (9th)
2009–10	Debbie McCormick	Allison Pottinger	Nicole Joraanstad	Natalie Nicholson	Tracy Sachtjen	Wally Henry	2010 OG (10th)
2010–11	Allison Pottinger	Nicole Joraanstad	Natalie Nicholson	Tabitha Peterson			2011 USWCC (silver)
2011–12	Allison Pottinger	Nicole Joraanstad	Natalie Nicholson	Tabitha Peterson	Cassandra Potter	Derek Brown	2012 USWCC (gold); 2012 WWCC (5th)
2012–13	Allison Pottinger	Nicole Joraanstad	Natalie Nicholson	Tabitha Peterson			2013 USWCC (bronze)
2013–14	Allison Pottinger	Nicole Joraanstad	Natalie Nicholson	Tabitha Peterson	Tara Peterson (WWCC)	Derek Brown (WWCC)	2013 USOCT (silver); 2014 USWCC (silver); 2014 WWCC (6th)
2015–16	Erika Brown	Allison Pottinger	Nicole Joraanstad	Natalie Nicholson	Tabitha Peterson (WWCC)	Ann Swisshelm (WWCC)	2016 USWCC (gold); 2016 WWCC (6th)
