= Nicole Joraanstad =

American curler (born 1980)

- Curler
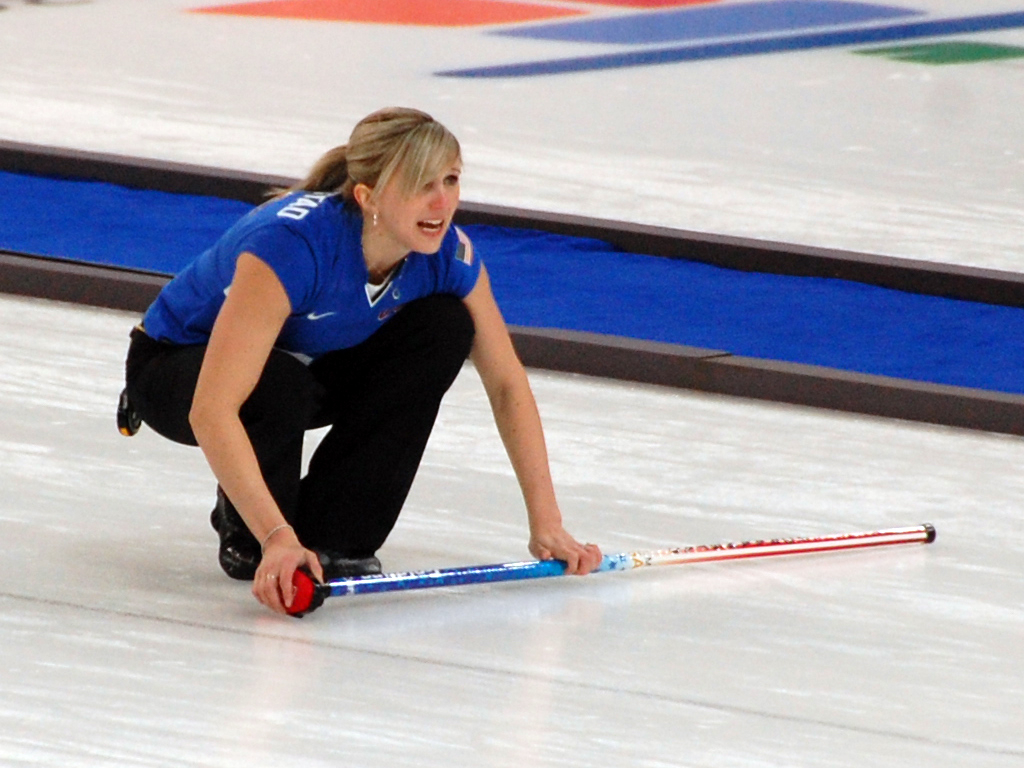
- Born: November 10, 1980 (age 46); Seattle, Washington

Team
- Curling club: Madison CC, Madison, WI
- Skip: Erika Brown
- Third: Allison Pottinger
- Second: Nicole Joraanstad
- Lead: Natalie Nicholson
- Alternate: Tabitha Peterson

Curling career
- World Championship: 9, (2002, 2004, 2006, 2007, 2008, 2009, 2012, 2014, 2016)
- Olympic: 1 (2010)
Medal record
Women's curling
World Curling Championships
Silver medal – second place	2006 Grande Prairie
World Junior Curling Championships
Bronze medal – third place	2000 Geising
United States Olympic Curling Trials
Gold medal – first place	2009 Broomfield	Team
Silver medal – second place	2013 Fargo	Team
Bronze medal – third place	2005 Madison	Team
United States National Championships
Gold medal – first place	2002 Eveleth
Gold medal – first place	2004 Grand Forks
Gold medal – first place	2006 Bemidji
Gold medal – first place	2007 Utica
Gold medal – first place	2008 Hibbing
Gold medal – first place	2009 Broomfield
Gold medal – first place	2012 Philadelphia
Gold medal – first place	2016 Jacksonville
Silver medal – second place	2003 Utica
Silver medal – second place	2011 Fargo
Silver medal – second place	2014 Philadelphia
Bronze medal – third place	2000 Ogden
Bronze medal – third place	2005 Madison
Bronze medal – third place	2013 Green Bay

Nicole Joraanstad (/ˈdʒɔːrənstɛd/ JOR-ən-sted; born November 10, 1980, in Seattle, Washington) is an American curler from Verona, Wisconsin. She currently plays second for Erika Brown.

== Career ==
At the 2000 World Junior Curling Championships, Joraanstad played third for Laura Delaney and won a bronze medal for Team USA. The following year, Joraanstad skipped her own team to a seventh-place finish.

Joraanstad would later join up with Patti Lank as her second, and Team USA finished in fourth place at the 2004 Ford World Curling Championships.

Joraanstad left Lank's team and joined up with Debbie McCormick. Team USA won a silver medal at the 2006 Ford World Women's Curling Championship losing to Sweden (skipped by Anette Norberg) in the final.

At the 2007 Aomori World Championships, Joraanstad and Debbie McCormick's Team USA lost to Scotland in the semi-final and took 4th place.

At the 2008 Women's National Championships in Hibbing, Minnesota, Joraanstad won her third straight national championship while playing for Debbie McCormick. Team McCormick was the first team to ever win three consecutive U.S. national titles. At the 2008 Vernon World Championships, Joraanstad and Debbie McCormick's Team USA finished 6-5 after round-robin play and did not advance to the playoff round.

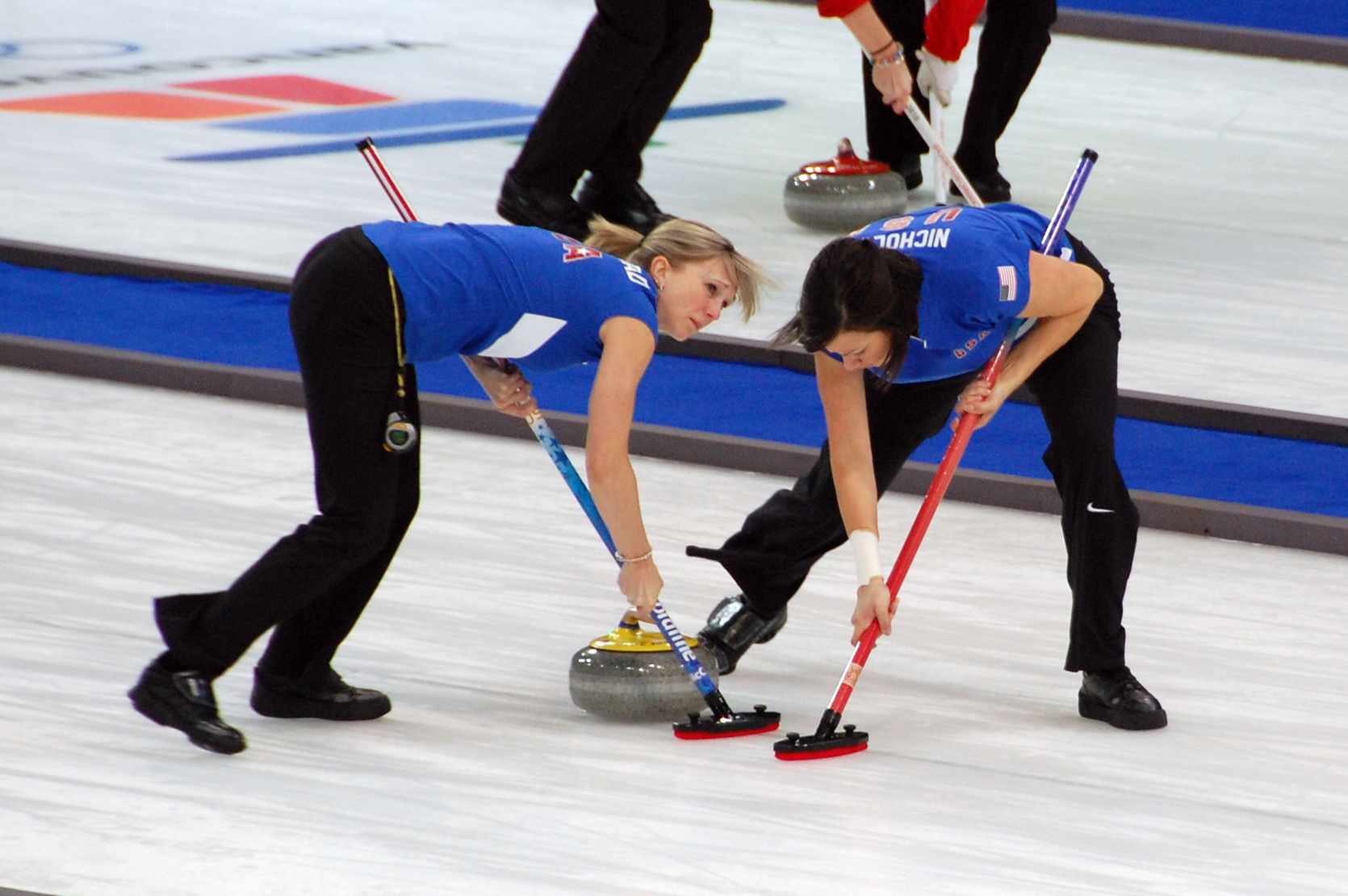
Joraanstad, left, sweeping a stone with Natalie Nicholson at the 2010 Winter Olympics

On June 4, 2008, Joraanstad received the Madison Sports Hall of Fame Club 2008 Sportswoman of the Year Award.

At the US National Championship / Olympic Trials - Curling in 2009, Joraanstad won her fourth straight national championship while playing with Debbie McCormick. They also won the right to represent the US at the 2010 Olympic Winter Games in Vancouver, BC.

In 2010, McCormick left the team as skip, and was replaced by the team's third, Allison Pottinger. Joraanstad would be promoted to the team's third.

In 2011, Team Pottinger (who Nicole plays third for) lost the US National Championship final to Patti Lank.

In 2012, Team Pottinger beat Cassie Potter in the final to go on to the World Championships in Lethbridge, Alberta. They lost a tie-breaker to get into the play-offs at the Worlds and finished fourth. Their win at the US Nationals earned them a spot into the 2013 Olympic Trials - Curling for the 2014 Olympic Winter Games in Sochi, Russia. The Olympic Trials - Curling are in November 2013.

Joraanstad has played in five Continental Cups, more than any North American curler.

== Personal life ==
A native of Kent, Washington, Joraanstad attended Kentridge High School and holds a business degree from the University of Wisconsin-Madison.

Her father is curler Gary Joraanstad, 1987 United States Men's champion, he competed on 1987 Hexagon World Men's Curling Championship skipped by Jim Vukich.

== Teams ==
Season	Skip	Third	Second	Lead	Alternate	Coach	Events
1999–00	Laura Delaney	Nicole Joraanstad	Kirsten Finch	Rebecca Dobie	Katie Beck	Lisa Schoeneberg	2000 USJCC (gold); 2000 WJCC (bronze)
1999–00	Debbie McCormick	Nicole Joraanstad	Stacey Liapis	Ann Swisshelm		Mike Liapis	2000 USWCC (SF)
2000–01	Nicole Joraanstad	Kirsten Finch	Katie Schmitt	Rebecca Dobie	Aileen Sormunen	Neil Doese	2001 USJCC (gold); 2001 WJCC (7th)
2001–02	Patti Lank	Erika Brown	Allison Darragh	Natalie Nicholson	Nicole Joraanstad		2002 USWCC (gold); 2002 WWCC (8th)
2002–03	Patti Lank	Erika Brown	Nicole Joraanstad	Natalie Nicholson			2003 USWCC (silver)
2003–04	Patti Lank	Erika Brown	Nicole Joraanstad	Natalie Nicholson	Barb Perrella (WWCC)	Steve Brown	2004 USWCC (gold); 2004 WWCC (4th)
2004–05	Patti Lank	Erika Brown	Nicole Joraanstad	Natalie Nicholson		Matt Hames	2005 USWCC/USOCT (bronze)
2005–06	Debbie McCormick	Allison Pottinger	Nicole Joraanstad	Tracy Sachtjen	Natalie Nicholson	Joni Cotten	2006 USWCC (gold)
2005–06	Debbie McCormick	Allison Pottinger	Nicole Joraanstad	Natalie Nicholson	Caitlin Maroldo	Wally Henry	2006 WWCC (silver)
2006–07	Debbie McCormick	Allison Pottinger	Nicole Joraanstad	Natalie Nicholson	Tracy Sachtjen		2007 USWCC (gold)
2006–07	Debbie McCormick	Allison Pottinger	Nicole Joraanstad	Natalie Nicholson	Maureen Brunt	Wally Henry	2007 WWCC (4th)
2007–08	Debbie McCormick	Allison Pottinger	Nicole Joraanstad	Natalie Nicholson	Tracy Sachtjen (WWCC)	Wally Henry	2008 USWCC (gold); 2008 WWCC (7th)
2008–09	Debbie McCormick	Allison Pottinger	Nicole Joraanstad	Natalie Nicholson	Tracy Sachtjen	Wally Henry	2009 USWCC/USOCT (gold); 2009 WWCC (9th)
2009–10	Debbie McCormick	Allison Pottinger	Nicole Joraanstad	Natalie Nicholson	Tracy Sachtjen	Wally Henry	2010 OG (10th)
2010–11	Allison Pottinger	Nicole Joraanstad	Natalie Nicholson	Tabitha Peterson			2011 USWCC (silver)
2011–12	Allison Pottinger	Nicole Joraanstad	Natalie Nicholson	Tabitha Peterson	Cassandra Potter	Derek Brown	2012 USWCC (gold); 2012 WWCC (5th)
2012–13	Allison Pottinger	Nicole Joraanstad	Natalie Nicholson	Tabitha Peterson			2013 USWCC (bronze)
2013–14	Allison Pottinger	Nicole Joraanstad	Natalie Nicholson	Tabitha Peterson	Tara Peterson (WWCC)	Derek Brown (WWCC)	2013 USOCT (silver); 2014 USWCC (silver); 2014 WWCC (6th)
2015–16	Erika Brown	Allison Pottinger	Nicole Joraanstad	Natalie Nicholson	Tabitha Peterson (WWCC)	Ann Swisshelm (WWCC)	2016 USWCC (gold); 2016 WWCC (6th)
