= Mackenzie Lank =

American curler (born 1994)

- Curler
- Born: July 4, 1994 (age 32)

Curling career
- Member Association: (North Dakota) Dakota Territory (2007-2008; 2010-2011) (United States) Grand National (2008-2009; 2010-2016); Wisconsin (2009-2010)
- World Championship: 1 (2011)
Medal record
Women's curling
United States National Championships
Gold medal – first place	2011 Fargo

Mackenzie Lank (born July 4, 1994) is an American curler. She has won the US Junior Championship twice and US Women's Championship once. She has frequently played with her mother, Patti Lank.

== Curling career ==
Lank competed in the United States Junior Curling Championships in 2008 and 2009, finishing eighth and seventh respectively.

During the 2010–2011 World Curling Tour (WCT), Lank played as lead on the team skipped by her mother, Patti Lank. Lank remained in this position at the 2011 United States Women's Curling Championship, where Team Lank beat Allison Pottinger in the final to claim the gold medal. The National Championship earned the team a spot at the World Championships, where the team finished seventh with a record of 6–5.

Lank skipped her own team at the 2011 US Junior Nationals, earning a bronze medal, her first medal at Junior Nationals. The following year, at the 2012 Junior Nationals, Lank played third for Miranda Solem. Team Solem earned the silver medal, losing the final 8–10 to Cory Christensen.

Lank resumed her position of lead on her mother's team at the 2012 Continental Cup of Curling. For the 2012 US Women's Championship Lank played as alternate, again for her mother's team. The team finished eighth with a 3–6 record. Lank moved to playing third for Team Lank for the 2012 St. Paul Cash Spiel, a WCT event, where they won the tournament. Lank again played third for her mother at the 2013 US Championship. The team finished the round robin with a record of 5–4, tied for fourth place. In the tiebreaker to determine the fourth playoff team, Lank's team lost to Alexandra Carlson.

Towards the end of 2013, Lank joined Cory Christensen's team to represent the United States at the Winter Universiade Games in Trentino, Italy. The American women finished eighth with a record of 3–6. Lank continued to play with Team Christensen for the 2014 US Junior Nationals where they won the gold medal. At the 2014 World Juniors Lank's team finished 6th with a 5–4 record. Lank and Team Christensen won again at the 2015 US Junior Nationals and at that year's World Junior Championship they improved to fifth place, with a similar record of 5–5. Just before competing at the World Juniors the team played in the US Women's Curling Championship in Kalamazoo. Lank's team had a 8–1 record through the round robin, which put them in the 3rd playoff position. In the 3 vs 4 page playoff game Lank's Team Christensen played against Team Lank, skipped by Mackenzie's mother Patti. Team Lank defeated Team Christensen 10–4.

== Personal life ==
Lank currently lives in Peterborough, Ontario.

== Teams ==
Season	Skip	Third	Second	Lead	Alternate	Coach	Events
2010–2011	Patti Lank	Caitlin Maroldo	Jessica Schultz	Mackenzie Lank	Christina Schwartz		2011 USWCC (gold)
2010–2011	Patti Lank	Caitlin Maroldo	Jessica Schultz	Mackenzie Lank	Debbie McCormick	Neil Harrison	2011 WWCC (7th)
2013–14	Cory Christensen	Rebecca Funk	Anna Bauman	Mackenzie Lank	Sonja Bauman	John Benton	2013 WUG (8th)
2013–14	Cory Christensen	Mackenzie Lank	Anna Bauman	Anna Hopkins	Tina Persinger	Linda Christensen	2014 USJCC (gold); 2014 WJCC (6th)
2014–15	Cory Christensen	Sarah Anderson	Mackenzie Lank	Jenna Haag	Taylor Anderson	John Benton	2015 USJCC (gold); 2015 USWCC (4th); 2015 WJCC (5th)
