= 2018 United States Women's Curling Championship =

- Host city: Fargo, North Dakota
- Arena: Scheels Arena
- Dates: March 3–10
- Winner: (Minnesota) Jamie Sinclair
- Curling club: Chaska Curling Center, Chaska, Minnesota
- Skip: Jamie Sinclair
- Third: Alex Carlson
- Second: Vicky Persinger
- Lead: Monica Walker
- Finalist: (Minnesota) Cory Christensen

The 2018 United States Women's Curling Championship was held from March 3 to 10 in Fargo, North Dakota. It was held in conjunction with the 2018 United States Men's Curling Championship. The winning team earned the right to represent the United States at the 2018 Ford World Women's Curling Championship provided that they are also in the top 75 WCT Order of Merit (2 tear period) or have at least 40 points WCT Order of Merit year-to-date ranking as of January 31, 2018.

== Teams ==
Eight teams qualified to participate.

Skip	Third	Second	Lead	2-yr WCT rank (Jan 31)	YTD WCT Points (Jan 31)
(North Dakota) Ann Podoll	Carissa Thomas	Rachel Workin	Christina Lammers	226	3.771
(Pennsylvania) Emily Anderson	Sherri Schummer	Katie Dubberstein	Libby Brundage	193	1.251
(Minnesota) Kim Rhyme	Rebecca Andrew	Katie Rhyme	Amy Harnden	201	7.605
(Minnesota) Cora Farrell	Cait Flannery	Lexi Lanigan	Rebecca Miles	129	1.241
(North Dakota) Beth Podoll	Emily Quello	Susan Dudt	Rebecca Rodgers	280	0
(Minnesota) Christine McMakin	Suzanna Viau	Anna Netteberg	Mairin Barrett	205	2.194
(Minnesota) Jamie Sinclair	Alex Carlson	Vicky Persinger	Monica Walker	16	228.981
(Minnesota) Cory Christensen	Sarah Anderson	Taylor Anderson	Jenna Martin	32	124.052

== Round-robin standings ==
Key
Teams to playoffs

Skip	W	L
(Minnesota) Jamie Sinclair	7	0
(Minnesota) Cora Farrell	5	2
(Minnesota) Cory Christensen	5	2
(Minnesota) Kim Rhyme	4	3
(North Dakota) Beth Podoll	3	4
(Minnesota) Christine McMakin	2	5
(Pennsylvania) Emily Anderson	1	6
(North Dakota) Ann Podoll	1	6

== Round-robin results ==
All draw times are listed in Central Standard Time.

=== Draw 1 ===
Sunday, March 04, 12:00pm

Team	1	2	3	4	5	6	7	8	9	10	11	Final
Beth Podoll	0	0	1	1	0	0	1	1	0	3	0	7
Christine McMakin	0	3	0	0	1	1	0	0	2	0	1	8

Team	1	2	3	4	5	6	7	8	9	10	Final
Cora Farrell	0	1	0	0	2	2	1	2	1	X	9
Ann Podoll	0	0	3	2	0	0	0	0	0	X	5

Team	1	2	3	4	5	6	7	8	9	10	Final
Kim Rhyme	0	0	0	0	2	0	0	1	X	X	3
Team Christensen	0	3	2	2	0	0	1	0	X	X	8

Team	1	2	3	4	5	6	7	8	9	10	Final
Emily Anderson	0	0	1	1	0	0	0	0	1	0	3
Jamie Sinclair	1	0	0	0	2	0	0	2	0	1	6

=== Draw 2 ===
Sunday, March 04, 8:00pm

Team	1	2	3	4	5	6	7	8	9	10	Final
Kim Rhyme	0	0	0	0	0	0	0	1	0	X	1
Jamie Sinclair	1	1	0	0	0	0	0	0	3	X	5

Team	1	2	3	4	5	6	7	8	9	10	Final
Emily Anderson	0	0	0	2	0	0	1	0	0	0	3
Team Christensen	0	1	0	0	1	0	0	1	2	1	6

Team	1	2	3	4	5	6	7	8	9	10	Final
Christine McMakin	0	0	1	0	1	2	0	1	0	X	5
Ann Podoll	1	1	0	3	0	0	1	0	2	X	8

Team	1	2	3	4	5	6	7	8	9	10	Final
Cora Farrell	0	0	0	2	2	1	1	1	0	1	8
Beth Podoll	2	2	0	0	0	0	0	0	2	0	6

=== Draw 3 ===
Monday, March 05, 2:30pm

Team	1	2	3	4	5	6	7	8	9	10	11	Final
Emily Anderson	0	0	0	0	3	0	0	0	0	1	1	5
Ann Podoll	0	0	2	0	0	1	0	0	1	0	0	4

Team	1	2	3	4	5	6	7	8	9	10	Final
Beth Podoll	0	0	1	1	1	1	0	2	0	1	7
Kim Rhyme	0	2	0	0	0	0	2	0	1	0	5

Team	1	2	3	4	5	6	7	8	9	10	Final
Cora Farrell	0	0	2	1	0	1	0	2	0	X	6
Jamie Sinclair	2	3	0	0	3	0	1	0	1	X	10

Team	1	2	3	4	5	6	7	8	9	10	Final
Team Christensen	0	1	0	4	0	0	1	0	0	4	10
Christine McMakin	1	0	1	0	0	2	0	1	1	0	6

=== Draw 4 ===
Tuesday, March 06, 8:00am

Team	1	2	3	4	5	6	7	8	9	10	Final
Jamie Sinclair	0	3	0	0	2	1	0	2	X	X	8
Christine McMakin	0	0	1	1	0	0	1	0	X	X	3

Team	1	2	3	4	5	6	7	8	9	10	Final
Team Christensen	2	0	1	0	0	1	0	2	2	X	8
Ann Podoll	0	1	0	0	1	0	2	0	0	X	4

Team	1	2	3	4	5	6	7	8	9	10	Final
Kim Rhyme	1	0	0	2	0	1	0	2	0	1	7
Cora Farrell	0	0	1	0	2	0	1	0	1	0	5

Team	1	2	3	4	5	6	7	8	9	10	Final
Beth Podoll	0	0	2	0	1	2	0	1	1	X	7
Emily Anderson	1	1	0	2	0	0	1	0	0	X	5

=== Draw 5 ===
Tuesday, March 06, 4:00pm

Team	1	2	3	4	5	6	7	8	9	10	Final
Team Christensen	0	0	2	0	0	1	0	0	0	X	3
Cora Farrell	0	0	0	0	2	0	0	3	2	X	7

Team	1	2	3	4	5	6	7	8	9	10	Final
Christine McMakin	1	1	1	0	1	0	0	1	1	X	6
Emily Anderson	0	0	0	2	0	1	1	0	0	X	4

Team	1	2	3	4	5	6	7	8	9	10	Final
Jamie Sinclair	1	0	1	0	0	2	0	0	3	X	7
Beth Podoll	0	1	0	1	0	0	1	1	0	X	4

Team	1	2	3	4	5	6	7	8	9	10	Final
Ann Podoll	0	0	0	2	3	0	1	0	0	0	6
Kim Rhyme	1	3	0	0	0	1	0	1	0	1	7

=== Draw 6 ===
Wednesday, March 07, 8:00am

Team	1	2	3	4	5	6	7	8	9	10	Final
Kim Rhyme	0	2	0	4	0	1	0	0	0	1	8
Emily Anderson	1	0	0	0	2	0	2	1	1	0	7

Team	1	2	3	4	5	6	7	8	9	10	Final
Ann Podoll	0	1	0	0	2	0	1	0	0	X	4
Beth Podoll	1	0	2	0	0	1	0	1	1	X	6

Team	1	2	3	4	5	6	7	8	9	10	Final
Cora Farrell	0	1	1	0	0	0	2	0	2	X	6
Christine McMakin	0	0	0	0	0	2	0	1	0	X	3

Team	1	2	3	4	5	6	7	8	9	10	Final
Jamie Sinclair	2	1	0	2	0	0	1	0	2	X	8
Team Christensen	0	0	1	0	2	1	0	1	0	X	5

=== Draw 7 ===
Wednesday, March 07, 4:00pm

Team	1	2	3	4	5	6	7	8	9	10	Final
Christine McMakin	1	0	0	0	0	1	0	0	X	X	2
Kim Rhyme	0	2	1	1	1	0	1	1	X	X	7

Team	1	2	3	4	5	6	7	8	9	10	Final
Ann Podoll	0	0	0	0	0	0	1	0	X	X	1
Jamie Sinclair	0	2	1	1	2	1	0	1	X	X	8

Team	1	2	3	4	5	6	7	8	9	10	Final
Emily Anderson	0	0	0	0	0	X	X	X	X	X	0
Cora Farrell	2	0	2	1	2	X	X	X	X	X	7

Team	1	2	3	4	5	6	7	8	9	10	Final
Beth Podoll	0	0	1	0	0	1	X	X	X	X	2
Team Christensen	3	2	0	0	2	0	X	X	X	X	7

== Playoffs ==
Semifinal			Final
			1	(Minnesota) Jamie Sinclair	6
2	(Minnesota) Cora Farrell	3	3	(Minnesota) Cory Christensen	5
3	(Minnesota) Cory Christensen	6

=== Semifinal ===
Friday, March 9, 2:00pm

Team	1	2	3	4	5	6	7	8	9	10	Final
(Minnesota) Cory Christensen	1	0	0	2	0	2	0	0	1	X	6
(Minnesota) Cora Farrell	0	0	0	0	0	0	2	1	0	X	3

Player percentages
(Minnesota) Cora Farrell		(Minnesota) Cory Christensen	
Rebecca Miles	92%	Taylor Anderson	88%
Cait Flannery	93%	Jenna Martin	97%
Lexi Lanigan	87%	Sarah Anderson	90%
Cora Farrell	70%	Cory Christensen	88%
Total	86%	Total	91%

=== Final ===
Saturday, March 10, 12:30pm

Team	1	2	3	4	5	6	7	8	9	10	Final
(Minnesota) Cory Christensen	1	0	0	2	0	0	1	0	1	0	5
(Minnesota) Jamie Sinclair	0	2	1	0	0	1	0	1	0	1	6

Player percentages
(Minnesota) Jamie Sinclair		(Minnesota) Cory Christensen	
Monica Walker	94%	Taylor Anderson	77%
Vicky Persinger	85%	Jenna Martin	74%
Alexandra Carlson	81%	Sarah Anderson	79%
Jamie Sinclair	81%	Cory Christensen	81%
Total	85%	Total	78%
