= Patti Lank =

Canadian-American curler

- Curler
- Born: July 4, 1964 (age 62); Midale, Saskatchewan

Curling career
- World Championship: 5 (1997, 1999, 2002, 2004, 2011)
Medal record
Women's Curling
World Curling Championships
Silver medal – second place	1999 Saint John
United States National Championships
Gold medal – first place	1997 Seattle
Gold medal – first place	1999 Duluth
Gold medal – first place	2002 Eveleth
Gold medal – first place	2004 Grand Forks
Gold medal – first place	2011 Fargo
Silver medal – second place	1998 Bismarck
Silver medal – second place	2000 Ogden
Silver medal – second place	2001 Madison
Silver medal – second place	2003 Utica
Silver medal – second place	2006 Bemidji
Silver medal – second place	2008 Hibbing
Silver medal – second place	2009 Broomfield
Silver medal – second place	2010 Kalamazoo
Silver medal – second place	2015 Kalamazoo
Bronze medal – third place	1996 Bemidji
Bronze medal – third place	2005 Madison
Bronze medal – third place	2007 Utica
United States Olympic Curling Trials
Silver medal – second place	2001 Ogden	Team
Bronze medal – third place	2005 Madison	Team
Silver medal – second place	2009 Broomfield	Team

Patti Lank (née Pyett; born July 4, 1964) is a Canadian–American curler from Lewiston, New York.

== Career ==
Patti Lank grew up in Saskatchewan, the daughter of Irvin and Reta, and began curling at the age of eleven in Weyburn, Saskatchewan. In Saskatchewan, she played in the 1981 and 1982 provincial school girl championships. She left Weyburn in around 1982, moving to Toronto, and played for Anne Dunn at the 1992 Ontario Scott Tournament of Hearts, finishing third. She then moved to Chicago with her husband, Jim, a pilot for Air Canada for two years, before moving to Lewiston, New York. While living in Lewiston, Lank curled out of the Niagara Falls Curling Club in Niagara Falls, Ontario.

She competed at her first US National Championships in 1994 and her team placed fourth. She has since gone on to compete in 21 National Championships. Patti Lank has won the United States title five times (1997, 1999, 2002, 2004, and 2011) and competed in the World Championships held in those years.

In 1995 Lank earned a silver medal at the United States Mixed Curling Championship.

At her first world championships, held in Bern, Switzerland in 1997, she and her team placed sixth with a 4–5 record. She won the silver medal two years later at the 1999 World Championships, losing to Elisabet Gustafson's Swedish team in the final. That is her best finish at World's. Lank's team placed seventh at the 2002 World's and fourth in 2004.

Four times Lank has competed at the US Olympic Trials, in 1997, 2001, 2005, and 2009. Lank's team has finished in the top 4 every time, making it to the final in both 2001 and 2009, but fell short of earning the spot at the Olympics each time.

In 2011, Lank and her team of Caitlin Maroldo, Jessica Schultz, and Mackenzie Lank went through the 2011 US Nationals round robin with an 8–1 record. They won the championship by defeating Allison Pottinger in the final. They represented the US at the 2011 World Championship in Esbjerg, Denmark, where they finished seventh with a record of 6–5.

Lank made her first appearance at the World Senior Curling Championships in 2017 after winning the US Senior National title. Her team finished fourth, losing to Team Scotland in the bronze medal match 5–8.

In 2020 Lank returned to the United States National Championships, as skip for Christine McMakin's team, finishing tied for fourth place.

== Teammates ==
1997 Berne World Championships

- Patti Lank, Skip
- Analissa Johnson, Third
- Joni Cotten, Second
- Tracy Sachtjen, Lead
- Allison Pottinger, Alternate

1999 Saint John World Championships

- Patti Lank, Skip
- Erika Brown, Third
- Allison Pottinger, Second
- Tracy Sachtjen, Lead
- Barb Perrella, Alternate

2004 Gävle World Championships

- Patti Lank, Skip
- Erika Brown, Third
- Nicole Joraanstad, Second
- Natalie Nicholson, Lead
- Barb Perrella, Alternate

2011 Esbjerg World Championship

- Patti Lank, Skip
- Caitlin Maroldo, Third
- Jessica Schultz, Second
- Mackenzie Lank, Lead
- Debbie McCormick, Alternate

== Grand Slam record ==
Lank has not played in a Grand Slam event since the 2011 Curlers Corner Autumn Gold Curling Classic.

Event	2007–08	2008–09	2009–10	2010–11	2011–12
Autumn Gold	DNP	DNP	DNP	DNP	Q
Players' Championships	DNP	DNP	Q	DNP	DNP

=== Former Events ===
Event	2007–08	2008–09	2009–10	2010–11
Manitoba Lotteries	DNP	DNP	DNP	Q
Sobeys Slam	Q	Q	N/A	Q
