= Jon Brunt =

American curler

- Curler ♂
- Born: October 5, 1974 (age 52); Portage, Wisconsin, U.S.

Team
- Curling club: Madison CC, Madison, Wisconsin, Portage CC, Portage, Wisconsin

Curling career
- Member Association: United States
- World Championship: 1 (2000)
Medal record
Curling
United States Men's Championship
Gold medal – first place	2000 Ogden
Silver medal – second place	2001 Madison
Silver medal – second place	2014 Philadelphia

Jonathan Brunt (born October 5, 1974) is an American curler from Portage, Wisconsin.

At the national level, he is a 2000 United States men's curling champion and a 2000 United States mixed curling champion curler.

== Teams ==
=== Men's ===
Season	Skip	Third	Second	Lead	Alternate	Coach	Events
1992–93	Jon Brunt	?	?	?			USJCC 1993 (4th)
1995–96	Jon Brunt	?	?	?			USMCC 1996 (4th)
1996–97	Mike Peplinski	Shaun Rodeski	Pete Fenson	Jon Brunt			
1998–99	Craig Brown	Matt Stevens	Jon Brunt	Steve Brown			
1999–00	Craig Brown	Ryan Quinn	Jon Brunt	John Dunlop	Steve Brown (WCC)	Diane Brown (WCC)	USMCC 2000 (gold); WCC 2000 (4th)
2000–01	Craig Brown	Ryan Quinn	Jon Brunt	John Dunlop			USMCC 2001/ USOCT 2001 (silver)
2001–02	Craig Brown	Doug Pottinger	Jon Brunt	John Dunlop	Cory Ward	Steve Brown	USMCC 2002 (3rd)
2002–03	Craig Brown	Doug Pottinger	Jon Brunt	John Dunlop			
2008–09	Craig Brown	Rich Ruohonen	John Dunlop	Pete Annis	Jon Brunt		USMCC 2009/ USOCT 2009 (4th)
2012–13	Craig Brown	Kroy Nernberger	Matt Hamilton	Jon Brunt			USMCC 2013 (7th)
2013–14	Craig Brown	Kroy Nernberger	Matt Hamilton	Jon Brunt			USMCC 2014 (silver)

=== Mixed ===
Season	Skip	Third	Second	Lead	Events
2000	Craig Brown	Erika Brown	Jon Brunt	Jill Jones	USMxCC 2000 (gold)

== Personal life ==
He started curling in 1986 at the age of 12.
