= 2001 United States Olympic curling trials =

2001 United States Olympic Curling Trials
- Host city: Ogden, Utah
- Arena: The Ice Sheet
- Dates: December 9–16, 2001
- Men's winner: Team Somerville
- Skip: Tim Somerville
- Third: Mike Schneeberger
- Second: Myles Brundidge
- Lead: John Gordon
- Alternate: Donald Barcome Jr.
- Finalist: Craig Brown
- Women's winner: Team Erickson
- Skip: Kari Erickson
- Third: Debbie McCormick
- Second: Stacey Liapis
- Lead: Ann Swisshelm
- Finalist: Patti Lank

The 2001 United States Olympic Curling Trials were held from December 9 to 16, 2001 in Ogden, Utah. Through double round-robin tournaments the trials determined which men's and women's teams would represent the United States at the 2002 Winter Olympics, also in Ogden. Tim Somerville's team won the men's side; his third time at the Olympics, first time for third Mike Schneeberger, and second time for Myles Brundidge and John Gordon. Kari Erickson and her team of Debbie McCormick, Stacey Liapis, and Ann Swisshelm won the women's side, their only loss coming after they had already clinched the Olympics berth. This was the first Olympics for Erickson and her sister Liapis and second for McCormick and Swisshelm.

== Qualification ==
It was planned to have six men's teams and six women's teams compete at the Olympic Trials, with three methods of qualification: winning the 2000 or 2001 National Championships or through the National Olympic Qualifier events. On the men's side, Craig Brown's team was the first to qualify as the 2000 National Champions. Jason Larway's team won the 2001 Men's National Championship but was deemed ineligible because, as a Canadian living in the United States, teammate Greg Romaniuk was eligible for the National Championship but not for the Olympics. Therefore, five men's teams qualified from the National Olympic Qualifier instead of four, to fill out the field of six teams. The 32-team Men's National Olympic Qualifier took place March 28 to April 1, 2001 at the Duluth Curling Club in Duluth, Minnesota. The five teams that qualified for the Trials were Paul Pustovar, Scott Baird, Andy Borland, Doug Pottinger, and Tim Somerville. Through the Washington State Regional Qualifier Larway had earned a spot at the National Qualifier, but had to miss the tournament because it occurred at the same time as the 2001 World Men's Championship, where he was representing the United States as the National Champion. Larway, with fellow curler Rich Ruohonen acting as his attorney, filed a grievance with the United States Olympic Committee and the United States Curling Association asking to be admitted to the Olympic Trials. Through an arbitration process Larway was eventually offered and accepted a seventh spot at the Olympic Trials.

On the women's side, Amy Wright qualified as the 2000 National Champion and Kari Erickson as the 2001 National Champion. The Women's National Olympic Qualifier was held April 5 to 8, 2001 at the Utica Curling Club in Whitesboro, New York. Twenty teams competed, with Patti Lank, Lori Mountford, Cassie Johnson, and Nicole Joraanstad earning spots at the Olympic Trials as the top four teams. Margie Smith's team finished fifth and so was named an alternate qualifier, though ultimately was not needed.

== Men ==
=== Teams ===
Seven men's teams qualified for the Olympic Trials:

Skip	Third	Second	Lead	Alternate	Coach	Qualification method
Craig Brown	Ryan Quinn	Jon Brunt	John Dunlop		Steve Brown	2000 National Champions
Jason Larway	Craig Disher	Travis Way	Joel Larway	Doug Kauffman	Mike Hawkins	2001 National Champions
Paul Pustovar	Mike Peplinski	Dave Violette	Cory Ward	Doug Anderson	Mike Liapis	National Olympic Qualifier: first place
Scott Baird	Matt Stevens	Cody Stevens	Phill Drobnick	Randy Baird		National Olympic Qualifier: second place
Andy Borland	Dave Johnson	Jeff Shapiro	Kevin Stevens	Ross Litman		National Olympic Qualifier: third place
Doug Pottinger	Troy Schroeder	Greg Johnson	Bill Todhunter	Nate Gebert		National Olympic Qualifier: fourth place
Tim Somerville	Mike Schneeberger	Myles Brundidge	John Gordon	Donald Barcome Jr.	Bud Somerville	National Olympic Qualifier: fifth place

=== Standings ===
The final standings after a double round-robin tournament:

Rank	Skip	W	L
1st place, gold medalist(s)	Tim Somerville	9	3
2nd place, silver medalist(s)	Craig Brown*	7	5
3rd place, bronze medalist(s)	Scott Baird*	7	5
4	Paul Pustovar	6	6
5	Doug Pottinger	5	7
6	Andy Borland	4	8
7	Jason Larway	4	8

^{*Brown and Baird played a tiebreaker game to determine second and third place, tiebreaker is not reflected in win–loss record.}

=== Draw results ===
All draw times are listed in Mountain Time Zone (UTC−7).

==== Draw 1 ====
Sunday, December 9, 2:00 pm

Sheet B	1	2	3	4	5	6	7	8	9	10	Final
Jason Larway 🔨	0	0	1	1	0	0	1	0	X	X	3
Craig Brown	2	0	0	0	2	2	0	4	X	X	10

Sheet D	1	2	3	4	5	6	7	8	9	10	Final
Andy Borland 🔨	0	0	0	0	3	0	1	1	0	0	5
Paul Pustovar	0	1	0	0	0	2	0	0	1	0	4

Sheet E	1	2	3	4	5	6	7	8	9	10	Final
Doug Pottinger 🔨	0	2	2	0	0	1	0	0	0	1	6
Tim Somerville	1	0	0	0	1	0	2	0	1	0	5

==== Draw 2 ====
Sunday, December 9, 7:00 PM

Sheet A	1	2	3	4	5	6	7	8	9	10	Final
Scott Baird 🔨	1	0	0	3	1	0	1	1	0	0	7
Tim Somerville	0	2	1	0	0	1	0	0	1	0	5

Sheet C	1	2	3	4	5	6	7	8	9	10	Final
Doug Pottinger 🔨	0	0	2	0	0	0	0	0	2	0	4
Craig Brown	0	0	0	2	0	2	1	1	0	0	6

Sheet F	1	2	3	4	5	6	7	8	9	10	Final
Jason Larway 🔨	2	0	1	0	0	2	0	0	2	1	8
Paul Pustovar	0	1	0	3	0	0	2	3	0	0	9

==== Draw 3 ====
Monday, December 10, 1:00 PM

Sheet B	1	2	3	4	5	6	7	8	9	10	Final
Paul Pustovar 🔨	3	0	1	1	0	2	0	0	X	X	7
Doug Pottinger	0	1	0	0	1	0	0	1	X	X	3

Sheet D	1	2	3	4	5	6	7	8	9	10	Final
Craig Brown 🔨	0	1	0	0	2	0	1	1	0	X	5
Scott Baird	0	0	1	0	0	0	0	0	1	X	2

Sheet E	1	2	3	4	5	6	7	8	9	10	Final
Andy Borland 🔨	0	2	0	0	2	0	0	1	0	0	5
Jason Larway	3	0	3	1	0	0	0	0	1	1	9

==== Draw 4 ====
Monday, December 10, 7:00 PM

Sheet A	1	2	3	4	5	6	7	8	9	10	11	Final
Doug Pottinger 🔨	0	1	0	2	0	2	0	3	0	0	0	8
Andy Borland	1	0	2	0	1	0	2	0	1	1	1	9

Sheet C	1	2	3	4	5	6	7	8	9	10	Final
Scott Baird 🔨	1	0	2	0	1	0	2	0	2	2	10
Paul Pustovar	0	1	0	4	0	2	0	1	0	0	8

Sheet F	1	2	3	4	5	6	7	8	9	10	Final
Tim Somerville 🔨	1	1	0	0	1	0	0	0	0	2	5
Craig Brown	0	0	1	1	0	0	2	0	0	0	4

==== Draw 5 ====
Tuesday, December 11, 1:00 PM

Sheet C	1	2	3	4	5	6	7	8	9	10	Final
Craig Brown 🔨	2	0	1	0	2	1	0	1	0	0	7
Andy Borland	0	1	0	1	0	0	1	0	1	1	5

Sheet D	1	2	3	4	5	6	7	8	9	10	Final
Jason Larway 🔨	0	1	0	1	0	0	0	2	0	X	4
Tim Somerville	1	0	2	0	2	2	1	0	1	X	9

Sheet E	1	2	3	4	5	6	7	8	9	10	Final
Doug Pottinger 🔨	0	1	0	2	0	0	1	1	0	0	5
Scott Baird	0	0	1	0	1	0	0	0	2	2	6

==== Draw 6 ====
Tuesday, December 11, 7:00 PM

Sheet A	1	2	3	4	5	6	7	8	9	10	Final
Jason Larway 🔨	0	0	0	2	0	0	0	2	0	1	5
Doug Pottinger	0	0	1	0	2	1	1	0	1	0	6

Sheet B	1	2	3	4	5	6	7	8	9	10	Final
Tim Somerville 🔨	0	1	0	4	2	1	X	X	X	X	8
Paul Pustovar	0	0	1	0	0	0	X	X	X	X	1

Sheet F	1	2	3	4	5	6	7	8	9	10	Final
Andy Borland 🔨	1	0	1	1	0	2	0	0	3	0	8
Scott Baird	0	2	0	0	3	0	1	1	0	4	11

==== Draw 7 ====
Wednesday, December 12, 1:00 PM

Sheet C	1	2	3	4	5	6	7	8	9	10	Final
Andy Borland 🔨	0	2	1	0	1	0	2	0	0	1	7
Tim Somerville	0	0	0	2	0	3	0	1	3	0	9

Sheet D	1	2	3	4	5	6	7	8	9	10	11	Final
Paul Pustovar 🔨	0	1	1	0	1	0	2	0	1	0	1	7
Craig Brown	0	0	0	2	0	1	0	2	0	1	0	6

Sheet E	1	2	3	4	5	6	7	8	9	10	Final
Scott Baird 🔨	0	0	1	0	1	0	0	1	0	0	3
Jason Larway	0	0	0	1	0	2	1	0	2	0	6

==== Draw 8 ====
Wednesday, December 12, 7:00 PM

Sheet A	1	2	3	4	5	6	7	8	9	10	Final
Jason Larway 🔨	0	0	0	1	0	1	0	2	0	2	6
Craig Brown	1	0	0	0	0	0	0	0	2	0	3

Sheet D	1	2	3	4	5	6	7	8	9	10	Final
Doug Pottinger 🔨	1	0	2	0	1	0	0	1	0	X	5
Tim Somerville	0	2	0	2	0	3	1	0	1	X	9

Sheet E	1	2	3	4	5	6	7	8	9	10	Final
Andy Borland 🔨	0	0	1	0	0	0	1	0	0	0	2
Paul Pustovar	0	0	0	2	1	0	0	0	2	1	6

==== Draw 9 ====
Thursday, December 13, 1:00 PM

Sheet B	1	2	3	4	5	6	7	8	9	10	Final
Tim Somerville 🔨	0	3	0	0	0	2	0	0	4	X	9
Scott Baird	1	0	0	1	0	0	2	1	0	X	5

Sheet C	1	2	3	4	5	6	7	8	9	10	Final
Paul Pustovar 🔨	1	0	2	1	0	1	2	0	0	1	8
Jason Larway	0	2	0	0	1	0	0	1	1	0	5

Sheet F	1	2	3	4	5	6	7	8	9	10	Final
Craig Brown 🔨	0	2	0	0	3	0	2	1	X	X	8
Doug Pottinger	1	0	0	1	0	1	0	0	X	X	3

==== Draw 10 ====
Thursday, December 13, 7:00 PM

Sheet C	1	2	3	4	5	6	7	8	9	10	Final
Scott Baird 🔨	0	2	0	1	0	1	0	3	0	1	8
Craig Brown	0	0	2	0	1	0	1	0	1	0	5

Sheet D	1	2	3	4	5	6	7	8	9	10	Final
Jason Larway 🔨	0	1	1	0	0	1	4	1	0	X	8
Andy Borland	0	0	0	1	1	0	0	0	1	X	3

Sheet E	1	2	3	4	5	6	7	8	9	10	11	Final
Doug Pottinger 🔨	1	0	1	0	0	3	0	0	1	0	1	7
Paul Pustovar	0	2	0	2	0	0	1	0	0	1	0	6

==== Draw 11 ====
Friday, December 14, 1:00 PM

Sheet A	1	2	3	4	5	6	7	8	9	10	Final
Paul Pustovar 🔨	0	0	3	0	2	0	0	4	0	1	10
Scott Baird	1	2	0	2	0	2	0	0	2	0	9

Sheet B	1	2	3	4	5	6	7	8	9	10	Final
Andy Borland 🔨	0	1	0	0	1	0	0	0	0	1	3
Doug Pottinger	1	0	0	1	0	1	1	0	2	0	6

Sheet E	1	2	3	4	5	6	7	8	9	10	Final
Craig Brown 🔨	2	0	0	1	0	0	1	1	0	X	5
Tim Somerville	0	3	1	0	0	3	0	0	2	X	9

==== Draw 12 ====
Friday, December 14, 7:00 PM

Sheet A	1	2	3	4	5	6	7	8	9	10	Final
Andy Borland 🔨	0	0	0	2	0	0	1	X	X	X	3
Craig Brown	1	2	2	0	0	4	0	X	X	X	9

Sheet C	1	2	3	4	5	6	7	8	9	10	Final
Tim Somerville 🔨	0	0	1	1	0	0	0	2	0	0	4
Jason Larway	0	0	0	0	1	1	0	0	1	0	3

Sheet D	1	2	3	4	5	6	7	8	9	10	Final
Scott Baird 🔨	0	0	0	2	0	0	5	0	X	X	7
Doug Pottinger	0	0	1	0	0	1	0	1	X	X	3

==== Draw 13 ====
Saturday, December 15, 1:00 PM

Sheet B	1	2	3	4	5	6	7	8	9	10	Final
Scott Baird 🔨	2	0	0	2	0	0	1	0	1	0	6
Andy Borland	0	2	1	0	1	2	0	1	0	2	9

Sheet D	1	2	3	4	5	6	7	8	9	10	Final
Paul Pustovar 🔨	1	0	0	0	X	X	X	X	X	X	1
Tim Somerville	0	3	2	2	X	X	X	X	X	X	7

Sheet F	1	2	3	4	5	6	7	8	9	10	Final
Doug Pottinger 🔨	0	1	1	0	0	0	0	3	1	1	7
Jason Larway	1	0	0	1	1	1	1	0	0	0	5

==== Draw 14 ====
Saturday, December 15, 7:00 PM

Sheet B	1	2	3	4	5	6	7	8	9	10	Final
Craig Brown 🔨	1	0	2	0	3	0	0	1	0	1	8
Paul Pustovar	0	1	0	1	0	0	2	0	1	0	5

Sheet C	1	2	3	4	5	6	7	8	9	10	Final
Jason Larway 🔨	1	0	0	1	0	1	1	1	0	X	5
Scott Baird	0	3	1	0	2	0	0	0	4	X	10

Sheet E	1	2	3	4	5	6	7	8	9	10	Final
Tim Somerville 🔨	1	0	0	1	0	1	0	X	X	X	3
Andy Borland	0	1	1	0	2	0	4	X	X	X	8

==== Tiebreaker ====
Sunday, December 16, 9:00 AM

Sheet B	1	2	3	4	5	6	7	8	9	10	Final
Craig Brown 🔨	2	1	1	1	0	3	X	X	X	X	8
Scott Baird	0	0	0	0	2	0	X	X	X	X	2

== Women ==
=== Teams ===
Six women's teams qualified for the Olympic Trials:

Skip	Third	Second	Lead	Alternate	Coach	Qualification method
Amy Wright	Amy Becher	Natalie Nicholson	Nikki Baird	Joni Cotten	Bob Fenson	2000 National Champions
Kari Erickson	Debbie McCormick	Stacey Liapis	Ann Swisshelm		Mike Liapis	2001 National Champions
Patti Lank	Erika Brown Oriedo	Allison Pottinger	Tracy Sachtjen		Bev Behnke	National Olympic Qualifier: first place
Lori Mountford	Jean Deans	Shelly Pape	Stephanie Radl			National Olympic Qualifier: second place
Cassie Johnson	Jamie Johnson	Hope Schmitt	Teresa Bahr Oberstein			National Olympic Qualifier: third place
Nicole Joraanstad	Kirsten Finch	Katie Schmitt	Becky Dobie		Neil Doese	National Olympic Qualifier: fourth place

=== Standings ===
The final standings after a double round-robin tournament:

Rank	Skip	W	L
1st place, gold medalist(s)	Kari Erickson	9	1
2nd place, silver medalist(s)	Patti Lank	8	2
3rd place, bronze medalist(s)	Cassie Johnson	4	6
4	Nicole Joraanstad	3	7
5	Lori Mountford	3	7
6	Amy Wright	3	7

=== Draw results ===
All draw times are listed in Mountain Time Zone (UTC−7).

==== Draw 2 ====
Sunday, December 9, 7:00 PM

Sheet B	1	2	3	4	5	6	7	8	9	10	Final
Kari Erickson 🔨	1	1	0	0	2	0	0	1	0	1	6
Cassie Johnson	0	0	1	0	0	1	1	0	2	0	5

Sheet D	1	2	3	4	5	6	7	8	9	10	Final
Amy Wright 🔨	1	0	2	4	0	3	0	1	X	X	11
Lori Mountford	0	1	0	0	2	0	1	0	X	X	4

Sheet E	1	2	3	4	5	6	7	8	9	10	Final
Patti Lank 🔨	2	0	0	4	0	0	0	3	1	X	10
Nicole Joraanstad	0	0	2	0	1	0	1	0	0	X	4

==== Draw 3 ====
Monday, December 10, 1:00 PM

Sheet A	1	2	3	4	5	6	7	8	9	10	Final
Cassie Johnson 🔨	0	2	1	0	2	0	0	3	0	1	9
Patti Lank	1	0	0	3	0	0	1	0	1	0	6

Sheet C	1	2	3	4	5	6	7	8	9	10	Final
Lori Mountford 🔨	1	1	0	0	0	0	0	0	X	X	2
Kari Erickson	0	0	0	2	1	2	4	2	X	X	11

Sheet F	1	2	3	4	5	6	7	8	9	10	Final
Nicole Joraanstad 🔨	0	0	3	0	1	0	1	0	2	1	8
Amy Wright	0	1	0	2	0	1	0	3	0	0	7

==== Draw 4 ====
Monday, December 10, 7:00 PM

Sheet B	1	2	3	4	5	6	7	8	9	10	Final
Patti Lank 🔨	0	1	0	3	1	0	1	0	2	1	9
Lori Mountford	2	0	1	0	0	2	0	1	0	0	6

Sheet D	1	2	3	4	5	6	7	8	9	10	Final
Cassie Johnson 🔨	2	1	1	0	0	1	0	2	0	1	8
Nicole Joraanstad	0	0	0	3	1	0	1	0	1	0	6

Sheet E	1	2	3	4	5	6	7	8	9	10	Final
Kari Erickson 🔨	1	2	0	1	1	1	0	1	1	1	9
Amy Wright	0	0	1	0	0	0	2	0	0	0	3

==== Draw 6 ====
Tuesday, December 11, 7:00 PM

Sheet C	1	2	3	4	5	6	7	8	9	10	Final
Amy Wright 🔨	0	0	3	0	0	2	0	2	0	X	7
Patti Lank	2	1	0	4	1	0	2	0	2	X	12

Sheet D	1	2	3	4	5	6	7	8	9	10	Final
Nicole Joraanstad 🔨	1	0	0	2	1	0	1	0	0	0	5
Kari Erickson	0	0	3	0	0	2	0	2	1	0	8

Sheet E	1	2	3	4	5	6	7	8	9	10	Final
Lori Mountford 🔨	0	3	0	0	2	1	1	0	2	X	9
Cassie Johnson	1	0	1	0	0	0	0	1	0	X	3

==== Draw 7 ====
Wednesday, December 12, 1:00 PM

Sheet A	1	2	3	4	5	6	7	8	9	10	11	Final
Cassie Johnson 🔨	0	X	3	0	0	1	0	3	1	0	3	11
Amy Wright	3	2	0	1	0	0	1	0	0	1	0	8

Sheet B	1	2	3	4	5	6	7	8	9	10	Final
Patti Lank 🔨	1	0	1	0	0	1	0	1	1	0	5
Kari Erickson	0	1	0	2	1	0	3	0	0	2	9

Sheet F	1	2	3	4	5	6	7	8	9	10	Final
Lori Mountford 🔨	0	2	1	0	5	0	3	X	X	X	11
Nicole Joraanstad	1	0	0	1	0	1	0	X	X	X	3

==== Draw 9 ====
Thursday, December 13, 1:00 PM

Sheet A	1	2	3	4	5	6	7	8	9	10	Final
Nicole Joraanstad 🔨	2	0	0	0	1	0	1	0	2	0	6
Patti Lank	0	1	2	1	0	2	0	2	0	1	9

Sheet D	1	2	3	4	5	6	7	8	9	10	Final
Cassie Johnson 🔨	1	1	0	4	0	0	0	0	1	0	7
Kari Erickson	0	0	4	0	0	2	1	0	0	1	8

Sheet E	1	2	3	4	5	6	7	8	9	10	Final
Lori Mountford 🔨	0	0	1	1	0	1	0	1	0	0	4
Amy Wright	1	0	0	0	1	0	4	0	1	1	8

==== Draw 10 ====
Thursday, December 13, 7:00 PM

Sheet A	1	2	3	4	5	6	7	8	9	10	Final
Kari Erickson 🔨	2	0	2	0	1	3	0	1	X	X	9
Lori Mountford	0	1	0	1	0	0	1	0	X	X	3

Sheet B	1	2	3	4	5	6	7	8	9	10	Final
Amy Wright 🔨	1	0	0	1	1	0	2	0	4	X	9
Nicole Joraanstad	0	0	1	0	0	1	0	2	0	X	4

Sheet F	1	2	3	4	5	6	7	8	9	10	Final
Patti Lank 🔨	2	0	0	2	2	0	0	3	X	X	9
Cassie Johnson	0	0	1	0	0	1	0	0	X	X	2

==== Draw 11 ====
Friday, December 14, 1:00 PM

Sheet C	1	2	3	4	5	6	7	8	9	10	Final
Nicole Joraanstad 🔨	2	0	3	1	0	2	0	2	X	X	10
Cassie Johnson	0	1	0	0	1	0	2	0	X	X	4

Sheet D	1	2	3	4	5	6	7	8	9	10	Final
Lori Mountford 🔨	1	0	0	1	0	1	1	1	0	0	5
Patti Lank	0	0	1	0	2	0	0	0	2	1	6

Sheet F	1	2	3	4	5	6	7	8	9	10	Final
Amy Wright 🔨	0	1	0	0	0	1	0	2	1	0	5
Kari Erickson	1	0	0	2	1	0	1	0	0	1	6

==== Draw 12 ====
Friday, December 14, 7:00 PM

Sheet B	1	2	3	4	5	6	7	8	9	10	Final
Patti Lank 🔨	0	3	2	0	2	0	1	0	3	X	11
Amy Wright	1	0	0	1	0	2	0	1	0	X	5

Sheet E	1	2	3	4	5	6	7	8	9	10	Final
Kari Erickson 🔨	1	0	0	0	2	0	3	0	0	X	6
Nicole Joraanstad	0	0	0	0	0	1	0	1	1	X	3

Sheet F	1	2	3	4	5	6	7	8	9	10	Final
Cassie Johnson 🔨	1	0	1	0	0	0	1	0	2	0	5
Lori Mountford	0	2	0	2	0	1	0	2	0	2	9

==== Draw 13 ====
Saturday, December 15, 1:00 PM

Sheet A	1	2	3	4	5	6	7	8	9	10	Final
Nicole Joraanstad 🔨	1	1	0	1	0	0	0	1	1	1	6
Lori Mountford	0	0	2	0	0	1	1	0	0	0	4

Sheet C	1	2	3	4	5	6	7	8	9	10	11	Final
Kari Erickson 🔨	0	1	2	0	0	1	0	0	0	1	0	5
Patti Lank	1	0	0	1	1	0	1	0	1	0	1	6

Sheet E	1	2	3	4	5	6	7	8	9	10	Final
Amy Wright 🔨	1	1	0	0	0	2	0	1	0	0	5
Cassie Johnson	0	0	1	1	1	0	3	0	1	1	8
