= Travis Way =

American curler and coach

- Curler ♂
- Born: April 30, 1975 (age 51)

Team
- Curling club: Granite CC, Seattle, WA

Curling career
- Member Association: United States
- World Championship: 1 (2001)
- Other appearances: World Junior Championships: 1 (1996)
Medal record
Curling
United States Men's Championship
Gold medal – first place	2001 Madison

Travis Way (born April 30, 1975) is an American curler and curling coach.

At the national level, he is a 2001 United States men's champion curler.

== Awards ==
- USA Curling Male Athlete of the Year: 1996.

== Teams ==
Season	Skip	Third	Second	Lead	Alternate	Coach	Events
1995–96	Travis Way	Troy Schroeder	Owen Bunstine	Brandon Way	Matt Stevens		USJCC 1996 (gold); WJCC 1996 (6th)
1996–97	Ian Cordner	Rodger Schnee	Travis Way	Owen Bunstine			
1998–99	Jason Larway	Travis Way	Joel Larway	Tom Violette			
1999–00	Tim Somerville	Mike Schneeberger	Travis Way	John Gordon			
2000–01	Jason Larway	Greg Romaniuk	Travis Way	Joel Larway	Doug Kauffman	Jack McNelly	USMCC 2001 (gold); WCC 2001 (6th)
2001–02	Jason Larway	Craig Disher	Travis Way	Joel Larway	Doug Kauffman	Mike Hawkins	USOCT 2001 (7th)

== Record as a coach of national teams ==
Year	Tournament, event	National team	Place
2014	2014 World Junior Curling Championships	United States (junior men)	9
