= United States Mixed Curling Championship =

- Established: 1975; 50 years ago
- 2024 host city: Denver, CO
- 2024 arena: Denver Curling Club
- 2024 champion: (Colorado) David Falco

The United States Mixed Curling Championship is the annual national curling championship for mixed curling teams in the United States. A mixed curling team consists of two men and two women with the throwing order alternating by gender. The United States Curling Association (USCA) has held the Mixed Championship annually since 1975. Starting in 2015 the winner has gone on to represent the United States at the World Mixed Curling Championship.

The 2019 Mixed Curling Championship was held March 23 to 30, 2019 at the Denver Curling Club in Golden, Colorado. Ten teams qualified for the 2019 Championship through regional play-downs.

On July 17, 2020 the USCA announced that the 2020 edition of the Mixed Championship would be cancelled due to the ongoing COVID-19 pandemic.

== Past champions ==
The winning team for every Mixed Championship since 1975.

Year	Site	Winning club	Skip	Third	Second	Lead
1975	Chicago, IL	(Wisconsin) Wausau, WI	Neil Collins	Sandy Robarge	Roger Robarge	Elaine Collins
1976	Milwaukee, WI	(North Dakota) Grafton, ND	Frank Aasand	Paddy Hankey	Ray Morgan	Vicky Aasand
1977	Hastings, NY	(Washington (state)) Granite CC, Seattle, WA	Garth Wallace	Sophie Wallace	Tom Wallace	Jan Spencer
1978	Colorado Springs, CO	(Wisconsin) Poynette, WI	Elgie Noble	Marilyn Noble	Dick Marquardt	Nancy Marquardt
1979	Duluth, MN	(Wisconsin) Wausau, WI	Neil Collins	Jo Shannon	Rick Shannon	Elaine Collins
1980	Highland Park, IL	(Minnesota) Bemidji, MN	Mark Haluptzok	Liz Johnson	Tim Johnson	Mary Jo Roufs
1981	Falmouth, MA	(Ohio) Bowling Green, OH	Fred Arn	Betty Arn	Bob Vollmer	Micki Vollmer
1982	Madison, WI	(Minnesota) Bemidji, MN	Mark Haluptzok	Liz Johnson	Tim Johnson	Mary Jo Roufs
1983	Two Harbors, MN	(Wisconsin) Poynette, WI	Elgie Noble	Marilyn Noble	Bill MacLeish	Mary MacLeish
1984	Bemidji, MN	(Wisconsin) Madison, WI	Steve Brown	Diane Brown	Vince Fitzgerald	Georgia Fitzgerald
1985	Detroit, MI	(Washington (state)) Granite CC, Seattle, WA	Doug Jones	Beth Bronger-Jones	Bob Anderson	Cheryl Hardy
1986	St. Paul, MN	(North Dakota) Alsen, ND	Joel Jacobson	Lori Kreklau	Tim Kreklau	Lisa Jacobson
1987	Brookline, MA	(Illinois) Wilmette, IL	Grayland Cousins	Sandy Resetich	Jim Wilson	Karyn Cousins
1988	Fairbanks, AK	(Wisconsin) Madison, WI	Steve Brown	Lisa Schoeneberg	Paul Schaefer	Bonnie Mansfield
1989	Seattle, WA	(Minnesota) Duluth, MN	Lee Leksell	Kelly Sieger	Kevin Stevens	Bonne Leksell
1990	St. Paul, MN	(Colorado) Denver, CO	Jack McNelly	Bev Behnke	Adolph Behnke	Dawna Bennett
1991	Denver, CO	(Wisconsin) Wausau, WI	Geoff Goodland	Kathy Baldwin	Cal Tillisch	Marcia Tillisch
1992	Hartland, WI	(Minnesota) Bemidji, MN	Andy Borland	Liz Johnson	Tim Johnson	Jean Borland
1993	Bismarck, ND	(Wisconsin) Eau Claire, WI	Geoff Goodland	Lori Mountford	Cal Tillisch	Marcia Tillisch
1994	Rochester, MN	(Minnesota) Bemidji, MN	Andy Borland	Liz Johnson	Tim Johnson	Jean Borland
1995	Utica, NY	(Wisconsin) Madison, WI	Mike Fraboni	Allison Pottinger	Mark Swandby	Toni Swandby
1996	Highland Park, IL	(Massachusetts) Broomstones CC, Wayland, MA	Grayland Cousins	Sandy Resetich	Jim Wilson	Karyn Cousins
1997	Two Harbors, MN	(Colorado) Denver, CO	Jack McNelly	Bev Behnke	Bucky Marshall	Susan Anschuetz
1998	Wayland, MA	(Wisconsin) Madison, WI	Mike Fraboni	Allison Pottinger	Craig Brown	Tracy Sachtjen
1999	Devils Lake, ND	(Washington (state)) Granite CC, Seattle, WA	Ian Cordner	Dolores Cordner	James Pleasants	Jaynie Pleasants
2000	Utica, NY	(Wisconsin) Madison, WI	Craig Brown	Erika Brown	Jon Brunt	Jill Jones
2001	Rice Lake, WI	(North Dakota) Williston, ND	Rick Tangedal	Janet Tangedal	Garland Legacie	Jan Legacie
2002	Seattle, WA	(Washington (state)) Granite CC, Seattle, WA	Brady Clark	Cristin Clark	Jason Larway	Kim Kropp
2003	Medford, WI	(Washington (state)) Granite CC, Seattle, WA	Brady Clark	Cristin Clark	Ryan Beighton	Bev Walter
2004	Mankato, MN	(Alaska) Fairbanks, AK	Steve Shuttleworth	Susan Carothers	Peter Lundquist	Cathy Floerchinger
2005	Laurel, MD	(Washington (state)) Granite CC, Seattle, WA	Brady Clark	Cristin Clark	Darren Lehto	Bev Walter
2006	Fairbanks, AK	(Washington (state)) Granite CC, Seattle, WA	Brady Clark	Cristin Clark	Tom Violette	Bev Walter
2007	Grafton, ND	(Washington (state)) Granite CC, Seattle, WA	Brady Clark	Cristin Clark	Leon Romaniuk	Bev Walter
2008	Detroit, MI	(North Dakota) Langdon, ND	Duane Symons	Val Nash	Chad Carlson	Christine Mikulich
2009	Medford, WI	(Washington (state)) Granite CC, Seattle, WA	Brady Clark	Cristin Clark	Philip Tilker	Bev Walter
2010	Chicago, IL	(Washington (state)) Granite CC, Seattle, WA	Brady Clark	Cristin Clark	Philip Tilker	Bev Walter
2011	Midland, MI	(Washington (state)) Granite CC, Seattle, WA	Brady Clark	Cristin Clark	Philip Tilker	Bev Walter
2012	Portage, WI	(Washington (state)) Granite CC, Seattle, WA	Brady Clark	Cristin Clark	Sean Beighton	Bev Walter
2013	Willmar, MN	(Connecticut) Nutmeg CC, Bridgeport, CT	Derek Surka	Charrissa Lin	Nate Clark	Rebecca Andrew
2014	Wisconsin Rapids, WI	(Illinois) Chicago CC, Chicago, IL	Greg Wilson	Pam Wilson	Collin Rittgers	Michele Rittgers
2015	Blaine, MN	(Washington (state)) Granite CC, Seattle, WA	Brady Clark	Cristin Clark	Sean Beighton	Jillian Walker
2016	Tempe, AZ	(Washington (state)) Granite CC, Seattle, WA	Fred Maxie	Em Good	Mac Guy	Frances Walsh
2017	Williston, ND	(Minnesota) Four Seasons CC, Blaine, MN	Hunter Clawson	Sarah Anderson	Caleb Clawson	Lexi Lanigan
2018	Lakeville, MN	(North Dakota) Fargo-Moorhead CC, Fargo, ND	Evan Workin	Rachel Workin	Jordan Brown	Christina Lammers
2019	Golden, CO	(Maryland) Potomac CC, Laurel, MD	Hunter Clawson	Katherine Gourianova	Eli Clawson	Sydney Mullaney
2020	Chaska, MN	Cancelled				
2021		Cancelled				
2022	Rochester, New York	(New York (state)) Rochester CC, Rochester, NY	Caitlin Pulli	Jeff Pulli	Rebecca Andrew	Jason Scott
2023	Denver, CO	(Illinois) Waltham CC, North Utica, IL	Jed Brundidge	Bella Hagenbuch	Cameron Rittenour	Mae Hagenbuch
2024	Denver, CO	(Colorado) Denver, CO	David Falco	Becca Wood	Lance Wheeler	Clare Moores
2025	Denver, CO	(Colorado) Denver, CO	David Falco	Becca Wood	Lance Wheeler	Clare Moores

== Champions by state ==
As of 2024 Mixed Curling Championship

Rank	School	Trophies
1	(Washington (state)) Washington	14
2	Wisconsin	11
3	Minnesota	6
4	North Dakota	5
5	Illinois	3
5	Colorado	4
7	Ohio	1
7	Massachusetts	1
7	Alaska	1
7	Connecticut	1
7	Maryland	1
7	(New York (state)) New York	1
