= Laura Hallisey =

American curler (born 1986)

- Curler
- Born: December 31, 1986 (age 39); Medfield, Massachusetts

Team
- Curling club: Philadelphia Curling Club, Paoli, Pennsylvania

Curling career
- World Championship: 1 (2010)
Medal record
Women's curling
United States National Championships
Gold medal – first place	2010 Kalamazoo

Laura Hallisey (born December 31, 1986) is a curler from Medfield, Massachusetts.

In 2005, Hallisey made her national debut at the United States Junior Championships. She would ultimately compete in four Junior Nationals, winning the silver medal in 2006 and 2007.

Hallisey competed in her first United States Women's Championship in 2009, which doubled as the Olympic Trials for the 2010 Vancouver Olympics. Competing as the lead for Erika Brown's team, they finished in fourth place.

Hallisey won her first US title, still on Brown's team, at the 2010 US Nationals in Kalamazoo, Michigan, earning the right to compete at the 2010 Swift Current World Championships.

== Teams ==
Season	Skip	Third	Second	Lead	Alternate	Coach	Events
2003–04	Monica Walker	Laura Hallisey	Jillian Walker	Juliana Sheldon	Nikki Rossetti	Russell Hallisey	
2004–05	Monica Walker	Laura Hallisey	Jillian Walker	Juliana Sheldon	Nikki Rossetti	Karyn Cousins	2005 USJCC (5th)
2005–06	Monica Walker	Laura Hallisey	Jillian Walker	Nikki Rossetti			2006 USJCC (silver)
2006–07	Monica Walker	Laura Hallisey	Jillian Walker	Nikki Rossetti			2007 USJCC (silver)
2007–08	Monica Walker	Laura Hallisey	Nikki Rossetti	Jillian Walker		Karyn Cousins	2008 USJCC (4th)
2008–09	Erika Brown	Nina Spatola	Nina Reiniger	Laura Hallisey			2009 USWCC/USOCT (4th)
2009–10	Erika Brown	Nina Spatola	Ann Swisshelm	Laura Hallisey	Jessica Schultz (Note: for WWCC)	Bill Todhunter	2010 USWCC (gold); 2010 WWCC (5th)
2010–11	Erika Brown	Nina Spatola	Ann Swisshelm	Laura Hallisey	Debbie McCormick		2011 USWCC (4th); 2011 Cont. Cup
