= Joni Cotten =

American curler (born 1953)

- Curler
- Born: May 21, 1953 (age 73); North Chicago, Illinois, U.S.

Team
- Curling club: Chicago Curling Club

Curling career
- World Championship: 4 (1997, 2000, 2001, 2003)
- Olympic: 1 (2002)
Medal record
Women's curling
Representing United States
World Championships
Gold medal – first place	2003 Winnipeg
US Women's Championship
Gold medal – first place	1997 Seattle
Gold medal – first place	2000 Ogden
US Olympic Trials
Gold medal – first place	2001 Ogden

Joni Cotten (born May 21, 1953, in North Chicago, Illinois) is an American curler from Mount Prospect, Illinois.

== Curling career ==
In 1997 Cotten won the United States Women's Championship while playing second for Patti Lank. As national champions they represented the United States at the 1997 World Women's Championship, finishing 7th. Cotten again won the US Championship in 2000, this time playing second for Amy Wright. At the 2000 World Championship the US women tied for 6th place with Germany and Denmark.

At the 2001 World Championship Cotten played as alternate with skip Kari Erickson, Debbie McCormick, Stacey Liapis, and Ann Swisshelm. The team finished 6th. Cotten continued to play alternate for team Erickson as they won the 2001 United States Olympic Trials and competed as Team USA at the 2002 Winter Olympics in Salt Lake City. At the Olympics they finished 4th, losing to Team Switzerland in the semifinals and Team Canada in the bronze medal match.

Cotten played in her 4th World Championship in 2003, as alternate for skip Debbie McCormick. The team finished round robin play tied for 3rd place with a record of 5–4. They then defeated Team Sweden in the semifinals and Team Canada in the finals to win the gold medal.

In 2012 Cotten returned to international competition, as alternate for the senior women's team skipped by Pam Oleinik. The team won the United States Senior Women's Championship and placed 5th at the World Senior Championship.

== Personal life ==
Cotten is married and has two children.

== Teams ==
Season	Skip	Third	Second	Lead	Alternate	Coach	Events
1996–97	Patti Lank	Analissa Johnson	Joni Cotten	Tracy Sachtjen	Allison Darragh		1997 USWCC (gold); 1997 WWCC (7th)
1999–00	Amy Wright	Amy Becher	Joni Cotten	Natalie Simenson	Corina Marquardt	Robert Fenson	2000 USWCC (gold); 2000 WWCC (6th)
2000–01	Kari Erickson	Debbie McCormick	Stacey Liapis	Ann Swisshelm	Joni Cotten	Mike Liapis	2001 USWCC (gold); 2001 WWCC (6th)
2001–02	Kari Erickson	Debbie McCormick	Stacey Liapis	Ann Swisshelm	Joni Cotten	Mike Liapis	2001 USOCT (gold); 2002 USWCC (silver); 2002 OG (4th)
2002–03	Debbie McCormick	Allison Pottinger	Ann Swisshelm Silver	Tracy Sachtjen	Joni Cotten	Wally Henry	2003 USWCC (gold); 2003 WWCC (gold)
2003–04	Debbie McCormick	Allison Pottinger	Ann Swisshelm Silver	Tracy Sachtjen	Joni Cotten		2004 USWCC (silver)
2005–06	Debbie McCormick	Allison Pottinger	Nicole Joraanstad	Tracy Sachtjen	Natalie Nicholson	Joni Cotten	2006 USWCC (gold)
2011–12	Pam Oleinik	Laurie Rahn	Julie Denten	Stephanie Martin	Joni Cotten		2012 USSCC (gold); 2012 WSCC (5th)
