= Amy Becher =

American curler (born 1978)

- Curler
- Born: May 24, 1978 (age 48); Omaha, Nebraska

Curling career
- World Championship: 1 (2000)
Medal record
Women's curling
Representing Nebraska
United States Women's Championship
Gold medal – first place	2000 Ogden
Silver medal – second place	1999 Duluth

Amy Becher (born May 24, 1978) is an American curler from Omaha, Nebraska. In 2000, she won the United States Women's Curling Championship as vice-skip on Amy Wright's team. They went on to represent the United States at the 2000 World Women's Curling Championship.

== Curling career ==
Becher competed at her first junior national championship in 1994, finishing last. She returned to junior nationals in 1995 and finished fourth. Becher again improved her results at the 1996 Junior Nationals, winning the championship as skip of her own team. As Team USA at the 1996 World Junior Curling Championships they finished last with a 0–9 record. In 1997 Becher joined Risa O'Connell's team at third, defended her junior national title and improved her World Juniors result by finished in fourth place at the 1997 World Juniors. She returned to the World Junior Championships a third time in 1999, as alternate on Hope Schmitt's team.

Upon moving from juniors to women's curling, Becher joined Amy Wright's team at third and found success quickly. At her first Women's National Championship in 1999, Team Wright took the silver medal when they lost to Patti Lank in the final. They again faced Team Lank in the final of the 2000 Women's Championship, this time winning with a final score of 12–9. As national champions, Becher and Team Wright earned a spot at the 2000 World Women's Championship as well as an opportunity to compete at the 2001 United States Olympic Curling Trials. At World's, they finished in a three-way tie for sixth place with a 4–5 record. During the 2001 Olympic Trials Wright felt she was not playing good enough and stepped aside, allowing Becher to take over skipping duties. Despite the change in line-up, they finished in a three-way tie for last place with a 3–7 record.

== Personal life ==
Becher's parents would bring her along to the curling club when she was young. She started curling competitively through the Ak-Sar-Ben Curling Club's juniors program.

Becher graduated from Minnesota State University, Mankato with a double major in chemistry and teaching.

== Awards ==
- USA Curling Team of the Year 1997

== Teams ==
Season	Skip	Third	Second	Lead	Alternate	Coach	Events
1995–96	Amy Becher	Theresa Faltesek	Monica Carlson	Heather Miller	Stacey Liapis (WJCC)		1996 USJCC (gold); 1996 WJCC (10th)
1996–97	Risa O'Connell	Amy Becher	Natalie Simenson	Missi O'Connell	Jennifer Herning (WJCC)		1997 USJCC (gold); 1997 WJCC (4th)
1997–98	Laura Delaney	Amy Becher	Carrie Ward	Becky Nelson	Jodi Armstrong		1998 USJCC (SF)
1998–99	Amy Wright	Amy Becher	Natalie Simenson	Joni Cotten			1999 USWCC (silver)
1998–99	Hope Schmitt	Nikki Baird	Katlyn Schmitt	Teresa Bahr	Amy Becher	Scott Baird	1999 WJCC (6th)
1999–00	Amy Wright	Amy Becher	Joni Cotten	Natalie Simenson	Corina Marquardt	Bob Fenson	2000 USWCC (gold); 2000 WWCC (6th)
2000–01	Amy Wright	Amy Becher	Nikki Baird	Natalie Nicholson	Joni Cotten	Bob Fenson	2001 USWCC (SF)
2001–02	Amy Wright	Amy Becher	Natalie Nicholson	Nikki Baird	Joni Cotten	Bob Fenson	2001 USOCT (4th)
