= Peplinski =

Peplinski is a surname. Notable people with the surname include:

- Jim Peplinski (born 1960), Canadian former National Hockey League player
- Mike Peplinski (born 1974), American curler
