= Jill Jones (curler) =

American curler (born 1975)

- Curler ♀

Team
- Curling club: Madison CC, Madison, Wisconsin

Curling career
- Member Association: Wisconsin
- World Championship: 1 (1992)
- Other appearances: World Junior Championships: 2 (1989, 1991)
Medal record
Curling
Representing United States
World Championships
Silver medal – second place	1992 Garmisch-Partenkirchen
United States Women's Championship
Gold medal – first place	1992 Grafton

Jill Jones is a former American curler.

She is a 1992 World silver medallist.

== Teams ==
=== Women's ===
Season	Skip	Third	Second	Lead	Alternate	Events
1988–89	Erika Brown	Tracy Zeman	Shellie Holerud	Jill Jones	Debbie Henry (WJCC)	USJCC 1989 (gold); WJCC 1989 (6th)
1990–91	Erika Brown	Jill Jones	Shellie Holerud	Debbie Henry		USJCC 1991 (gold); WJCC 1991 (5th)
1991–92	Lisa Schoeneberg	Amy Hatten-Wright	Lori Mountford	Jill Jones		USWCC 1992 (gold); WCC 1992 (silver)

=== Mixed ===
Season	Skip	Third	Second	Lead	Events
2000	Craig Brown	Erika Brown	Jon Brunt	Jill Jones	USMxCC 2000 (gold)
