= Stacey Liapis =

American curler (born 1974)

- Curler
- Born: August 19, 1974 (age 52); Bemidji, Minnesota

Curling career
- World Championship: 2 (1998, 2001)
- Olympic: 2 (1998, 2002)
Medal record
Women's curling
Representing United States
World Junior Championship
Silver medal – second place	1992 Oberstdorf
Bronze medal – third place	1993 Grindelwald
Silver medal – second place	1994 Sofia
US Olympic Trials
Gold medal – first place	1997 Duluth
Gold medal – first place	2001 Ogden
US Women's Championship
Gold medal – first place	1998 Bismark
Gold medal – first place	2001 Madison
Silver medal – second place	1997 Seattle
Bronze medal – third place	1999 Duluth
Bronze medal – third place	2000 Ogden

Stacey Liapis (born August 19, 1974) is an American curler from Bemidji, Minnesota. She played much of her career on teams with her sister Kari Erickson. She is a two-time Olympian, in 1998 and 2002, and a two-time United States National Champion, in 1998 and 2001.

== Curling career ==
Liapis had a very successful juniors career, winning the United States Junior Championship four times and competing at the World Junior Championship five times. She started her competitive career playing third for her sister Kari, making it to the semifinals or better at the United States Junior Championships three years in a row, 1989 to 1991. In 1990 the Liapis sisters won the championship, along with Heidi Rollheiser and Roberta Breyen. At World's in Portage la Prairie, Manitoba they finished in sixth place with a 4–5 record. Starting in the 1991–92 season Erika Brown took over as skip for the team. Together Liapis and Brown won the next three United States Junior Championships in a row and medalled at each of the World Championships. At the 1992 and 1994 World Championships they earned the silver medal while in 1993 they earned bronze. During the 1995–96 season, her final as a junior curler, Liapis skipped her own team at Nationals, losing in the semifinals. She still got a chance to compete at one more World Junior Championship when Amy Becher's team asked her to be their alternate.

At the 1998 Winter Olympics Liapis was alternate for Lisa Schoeneberg's Team USA; they finished in fifth place with a 2–5 record. A few months later she won her first United States Women's Championship, playing second for her sister with Lori Kreklau at third and Ann Swisshelm at lead. As American champions they represented the United States at the 1998 World Women's Championship in Kamloops, British Columbia. They finished in ninth place with a 2–7 record. In 2001 Liapis won her second women's national championship, again playing second with her sister Kari as skip and Swisshelm as lead but this time with Debbie McCormick at third. At that year's World's they finished in sixth place with a 5–4 record. The team maintained the same lineup for the 2001–02 season, winning the Olympic Trials and finishing second at Nationals. At the 2002 Winter Olympics they entered the playoffs as the third seed team but lost their semifinal game to Switzerland's Luzia Ebnöther. In the bronze medal game they faced the number one seed Canada with skip Kelley Law, losing 5–9 to finish in fourth place.

== Personal life ==
Liapis was one of the athletes supported by Home Depot and the Olympic Job Opportunity Program, whereby she worked 20 hours a week, got paid for 40 and was given flexible working hours in order to complete her training requirements.

== Teams ==
Season	Skip	Third	Second	Lead	Alternate	Coach	Events
1988–89	Kari Liapis	Stacey Liapis	Heidi Rollheiser	Roberta Breyen			1989 USJCC (silver)
1989–90	Kari Liapis	Stacey Liapis	Heidi Rollheiser	Roberta Breyen	Julie Breyen		1990 USJCC (gold); 1990 WJCC (6th)
1990–91	Kari Liapis	Stacey Liapis	Tracy Lindgren	Roberta Breyen			1991 USJCC (SF)
1991–92	Erika Brown	Kari Liapis	Stacey Liapis	Roberta Breyen	Debbie Henry		1992 USJCC (gold); 1992 WJCC (silver)
1992–93	Erika Brown	Kari Liapis	Stacey Liapis	Debbie Henry	Analissa Johnson		1993 USJCC (gold); 1993 WJCC (bronze)
1993–94	Erika Brown	Debbie Henry	Stacey Liapis	Analissa Johnson	Allison Darragh		1994 USJCC (gold); 1994 WJCC (silver)
1995–96	Stacey Liapis	Jamie Johnson	Cassie Johnson	Tina Kelly			1996 USJCC (SF)
1995–96	Amy Becher	Theresa Faltesek	Monica Carlson	Heather Miller	Stacey Liapis		1996 WJCC (10th)
1997–98	Lisa Schoeneberg	Erika Brown	Debbie Henry	Lori Mountford	Stacey Liapis	Steve Brown	1998 OG (5th)
1997–98	Kari Erickson	Lori Kreklau	Stacey Liapis	Ann Swisshelm	Risa O'Connell	Mike Liapis	1998 USWCC (gold); 1998 WWCC (9th)
1999–00	Debbie McCormick	Nicole Joraanstad	Stacey Liapis	Ann Swisshelm		Mike Liapis	2000 USWCC (SF)
2000–01	Kari Erickson	Debbie McCormick	Stacey Liapis	Ann Swisshelm	Joni Cotten	Mike Liapis	2001 USWCC (gold); 2001 WWCC (6th)
2001–02	Kari Erickson	Debbie McCormick	Stacey Liapis	Ann Swisshelm	Joni Cotten	Mike Liapis	2001 USOCT (gold); 2002 USWCC (silver); 2002 OG (4th)
