= 2010 United States Women's Curling Championship =

- Host city: Kalamazoo, Michigan
- Arena: Wings Stadium
- Dates: March 6–13
- Winner: (Wisconsin) Team Brown
- Curling club: Madison CC, Madison
- Skip: Erika Brown
- Third: Nina Spatola
- Second: Ann Swisshelm
- Lead: Laura Hallisey
- Coach: Bill Todhunter
- Finalist: (New York (state)) Patti Lank

The 2010 United States Women's Curling Championships were held at Wings Stadium in Kalamazoo, Michigan, from March 6, 2010, to March 13, 2010. This was the 34th edition of the United States Women's Curling Championship; it was held alongside the 2010 United States Men's Curling Championship.

Teams qualified through three different methods. First, the defending champions were granted an automatic berth; however, Team McCormick elected not to compete because of the Vancouver Olympics which take place during the preceding two weeks. Next, teams traditionally compete first through regional qualifiers with the top teams advancing to the nationals and then the runners-up compete at a Nationals Playdown to determine the final spots. However, so few women's teams submitted applications to the Regional Qualifiers that all teams were directly advanced to the National Championships.

The winning team represented the United States at the 2010 Ford World Women's Curling Championship.

== Teams ==
The teams are listed as follows:

Skip	Third	Second	Lead	Alternate	Locale
Erika Brown	Nina Spatola	Ann Swisshelm	Laura Hallisey		Madison, Wisconsin
Gabrielle Coleman	Ann Drummie	JoDee Dike-Johnson	Karen Officer		Mountain View, California
Lysa Hambley	Em Good	Elle LeBeau	Cynthia Eng-Dinsel	Sara Skulec	(Washington (state)) Lynnwood, Washington
Rebecca Hamilton	Karlie Koenig	Jenna Haag	Grace Gabower		McFarland, Wisconsin
Matina Heisler	Elizabeth Abeltin	Marinna Martini	Wendy Scholes	Barbara Thomson	Falmouth, Massachusetts
Debra Horn	Laurel Maurer	Emilia Juocys	Courtney Schmidt		Shaker Heights, Ohio
Patti Lank	Aileen Sormunen	Caitlin Maroldo	Jessica Schultz		(New York (state)) Lewiston, New York
Monica Walker	Elizabeth Williams	Ashley Lawreck	Rachel Ryan		Boston, Massachusetts
Kimberly Wapola	Brigid Ellig	Carol Strojny	Connie Kupferschmidt		Mahtomedi, Minnesota
Amy Wright	Courtney George	Jordan Moulton	Amanda McLean	Patricia Luke	Duluth, Minnesota

== Round robin standings ==
Team (Skip)	W	L
(Minnesota) Amy Wright	7	2
(Wisconsin) Erika Brown	7	2
(New York (state)) Patti Lank*	7	2
(Wisconsin) Rebecca Hamilton	7	2
(Minnesota) Kimberly Wapola	5	4
(Massachusetts) Monica Walker	5	4
(Ohio) Debra Horn	3	6
(California) Gabrielle Coleman	3	6
(Washington (state)) Lysa Hambley	1	8
(Massachusetts) Matina Heisler	1	8

* clinched playoff berth

== Tiebreakers ==
=== Tiebreaker 1 ===
Thursday, March 11, 12:00 pm

Team	1	2	3	4	5	6	7	8	9	10	Final
(New York (state)) Patti Lank	0	2	0	1	0	0	2	0	0	1	6
(Minnesota) Amy Wright 🔨	1	0	1	0	0	1	0	3	1	0	7

=== Tiebreaker 2 ===
Thursday, March 11, 4:00 pm

Team	1	2	3	4	5	6	7	8	9	10	Final
(New York (state)) Patti Lank 🔨	2	0	1	1	0	1	0	0	1	X	6
(Wisconsin) Erika Brown	0	2	0	0	2	0	5	0	0	X	9

== Playoffs ==
Page playoff system
1	(Minnesota) Amy Wright	5
2	(Wisconsin) Erika Brown	8
3	(New York (state)) Patti Lank	8
4	(Wisconsin) Rebecca Hamilton	4

Semifinal
1	(Minnesota) Amy Wright	2
3	(New York (state)) Patti Lank	9

Final
2	(Wisconsin) Erika Brown	5
3	(New York (state)) Patti Lank	4

=== 1 vs. 2 game ===
Friday, March 12, 8:00am

Team	1	2	3	4	5	6	7	8	9	10	Final
(Minnesota) Amy Wright 🔨	1	0	1	0	0	1	0	0	2	X	5
(Wisconsin) Erika Brown	0	2	0	2	1	0	2	1	0	X	8

=== 3 vs. 4 game ===
Friday, March 12, 8:00am

Team	1	2	3	4	5	6	7	8	9	10	Final
(New York (state)) Patti Lank 🔨	2	0	2	0	0	1	0	1	2	X	8
(Wisconsin) Rebecca Hamilton	0	1	0	0	2	0	1	0	0	X	4

=== Semifinal ===
Friday, March 12, 4:00pm

Team	1	2	3	4	5	6	7	8	9	10	Final
(Minnesota) Amy Wright 🔨	0	0	0	1	0	0	1	0	X	X	2
(New York (state)) Patti Lank	1	0	0	0	2	4	0	2	X	X	9

=== Championship final ===
Saturday, March 13, 10:00am

Team	1	2	3	4	5	6	7	8	9	10	11	Final
(Wisconsin) Erika Brown 🔨	0	0	1	0	2	0	0	1	0	0	1	5
(New York (state)) Patti Lank	1	0	0	1	0	0	1	0	0	1	0	4

== Other notable participants ==
Other notable participants include Courtney George, Jordan Moulton, Jessica Schultz, and Ann Swisshelm.
