= Myles Brundidge =

American curler

- Curler
- Born: June 1, 1960 (age 66); Wisconsin Rapids, Wisconsin, U.S.

Curling career
- World Championship: 3 (1995, 1996, 1999)
- Olympic: 2 (1998, 2002)
Medal record
Men's curling
Representing United States
US Men's Championship
Gold medal – first place	1995 Appleton
Gold medal – first place	1996 Bemidji
Gold medal – first place	1999 Duluth
US Olympic Trials
Gold medal – first place	1997 Duluth
Gold medal – first place	2001 Ogden

Myles Brundidge (born 1960 in Wisconsin Rapids, Wisconsin) is an American curler. He competed at the 1998 Winter Olympics in Nagano, where the American team placed 4th, and at the 2002 Winter Olympics in Salt Lake City, where they placed 7th. In 1999 he was named the United States Curling Association and United States Olympic Committee Male Athlete of the Year.

== Teams ==
1998 Winter Olympics

- Tim Somerville, Skip
- Mike Peplinski, Third
- Myles Brundidge, Second
- John Gordon, Lead

2002 Winter Olympics, 1995 World Men's Championship, 1996 World Men's Championship

- Tim Somerville, Skip
- Mike Schneeberger, Third
- Myles Brundidge, Second
- John Gordon, Lead

1999 World Men's Championship

- Tim Somerville, Skip
- Donald Barcome Jr., Third
- Myles Brundidge, Second
- John Gordon, Lead
