= Ryan Quinn (curler) =

American curler

- Curler ♂
- Born: January 29, 1978 (age 48); La Crosse, Wisconsin, U.S.

Team
- Curling club: Eau Claire Curling Club

Curling career
- Member Association: United States
- World Championship: 1 (2000)
- Other appearances: World Junior Championships: 2 (1994, 1995)
Medal record
Curling
United States Men's Championship
Gold medal – first place	2000 Ogden
Silver medal – second place	2001 Madison
World Junior Championships
Bronze medal – third place	1994 Sofia

Ryan Quinn (born January 29, 1978) is an American curler from Eau Claire, Wisconsin.

At the national level, he is a 2000 United States men's curling champion.

== Teams ==
Season	Skip	Third	Second	Lead	Alternate	Coach	Events
1993–94	Mike Peplinski	Craig Brown	Ryan Braudt	Cory Ward	Ryan Quinn		WJCC 1994 (bronze)
1994–95	Mike Peplinski	Craig Brown	Ryan Braudt	Cory Ward	Ryan Quinn		WJCC 1995 (5th)
1999–00	Craig Brown	Ryan Quinn	Jon Brunt	John Dunlop	Steve Brown (WCC)	Diane Brown (WCC)	USMCC 2000 (gold); WCC 2000 (4th)
2000–01	Craig Brown	Ryan Quinn	Jon Brunt	John Dunlop			USMCC 2001/ USOCT 2001 (silver)
2002–03	Ryan Quinn	Cory Ward	Jon Brunt	Doug Anderson			USMCC 2003 (8th)
2003–04	Craig Brown	Ryan Quinn	Cory Ward	Mitch Marks			

== Personal life ==
He started curling in 1986 at the age of 8.
