= Ann Swisshelm =

American curler (born 1968)

- Curler
- Other names: Ann Swisshelm Silver
- Born: March 9, 1968 (age 58); Middletown, Ohio, U.S.

Team
- Curling club: Exmoor CC, Highland Park, Illinois

Curling career
- World Championship: 5 (1998, 2001, 2003, 2010, 2013)
- Olympic: 2 (2002, 2014)
Medal record
Women's curling
Representing the United States
World Championships
Gold medal – first place	2003 Winnipeg
World Senior Championships
Silver medal – second place	2022 Geneva
United States National Championships
Gold medal – first place	1998 Bismarck
Gold medal – first place	2001 Madison
Gold medal – first place	2003 Utica
Gold medal – first place	2010 Kalamazoo
Gold medal – first place	2013 Green Bay
Silver medal – second place	1997 Seattle
Silver medal – second place	2002 Eveleth
Silver medal – second place	2004 Grand Forks
Silver medal – second place	2005 Madison
Silver medal – second place	2006 Bemidji
Silver medal – second place	2008 Hibbing
Bronze medal – third place	1996 Bemidji
Bronze medal – third place	1999 Duluth
Bronze medal – third place	2000 Ogden
Bronze medal – third place	2007 Utica
United States Olympic Curling Trials
Gold medal – first place	2001 Ogden	Team
Gold medal – first place	2013 Fargo	Team
Silver medal – second place	2005 Madison	Team
Silver medal – second place	2009 Broomfield	Team
Bronze medal – third place	1997 Duluth	Team

Ann Swisshelm (born March 9, 1968) is a curler from Chicago. Swisshelm represented the United States in the 2002 Salt Lake City Olympics and the 2014 Sochi Olympics. She has also been known as Ann Swisshelm Silver.

== Career ==
Swisshelm began curling at age ten at the Exmoor Country Club in Highland Park, a suburb of Chicago.

She made her United States National Championship debut in 1995, where her team placed fifth. Since then she has competed in the National Championships 18 more times. Her team won the National title five times, in 1998, 2001, 2003, 2010, and 2013.

At her first World Championships in 1998, Swisshelm and team finished in a three-way tie for eighth. In 2001 her team improved to a fifth-place finish and a 5 – 4 record. Her best performance at the World Championships came with her third appearance in 2003. Team USA finished third in the round robin competition. In the semifinals they defeated Team Sweden (skipped by future Olympic Gold Medalist Anette Norberg) and advanced to take on Colleen Jones's Canadian team in the final. Playing in Winnipeg, Manitoba, they defeated the Canadians and Swisshelm earned her first World Championship medal. Swisshelm returned to the World Championships two more times, in 2010 and 2013, but failed to get a second medal.

=== Olympics ===
In 2002 Ann Swisshelm competed at her first Olympic Games. Team United States placed third after the round robin competition with a 6 – 3 record. In the semifinals the United States lost to the eventual silver medalists from Switzerland. In the Bronze Medal match they took on Kelley Law's team from Canada. The match ended with a 9 – 5 score with the Canadians taking the bronze medal. Swisshelm returned to the next two United States Olympic Trials after the 2002 Olympics only to finish second both times.

Swisshelm and her team again qualified to participate at the United States Olympic Curling Trials in 2014, finishing first in the round robin standings and defeating Allison Pottinger in a best-of-three series final to clinch the berth to the Olympics. At the 2014 Winter Games in Sochi, Swisshelm's team finished last with a 1–8 record.

== Awards ==
- 2001 & 2014 United States Olympic Committee Female Curler of the Year
- 2003 & 2013 United States Olympic Committee Curling Team of the Year
- 2001 Frances Brodie Award Winner – World Curling Federation Sportsmanship Award
- 2008 Ann Brown Sportsmanship Award – U.S. Nationals

== Personal life ==
Ann Swisshelm was born in Middletown, Ohio, and currently resides in Chicago with her husband Sean Silver. She graduated from Drake University with a Bachelor of Fine Arts.

== Teammates ==
2002 Salt Lake City Winter Olympics

- Kari Erickson, Skip
- Debbie McCormick, Third
- Stacey Liapis, Second
- Ann Swisshelm, Lead
- Joni Cotten, Alternate

2003 Winnipeg World Championships

- Debbie McCormick, Skip
- Allison Pottinger, Third
- Ann Swisshelm, Second
- Tracy Sachtjen, Lead
- Joni Cotten, Alternate

2010 Swift Current World Championships

- Erika Brown, Skip
- Nina Spatola, Third
- Ann Swisshelm, Second
- Laura Hallisey, Lead
- Jessica Schultz, Alternate

2014 Sochi Winter Olympics

- Erika Brown, Skip
- Debbie McCormick, Third
- Jessica Schultz, Second
- Ann Swisshelm, Lead
- Allison Pottinger, Alternate
