= Kari Erickson =

American curler (born 1971)

- Curler
- Born: Kari Liapis; December 18, 1971 (age 54); Bemidji, Minnesota

Curling career
- World Championship: 2 (1998, 2001)
- Olympic: 1 (2002)
Medal record
Women's curling
Representing United States
World Junior Championship
Silver medal – second place	1992 Oberstdorf
Bronze medal – third place	1993 Grindelwald
US Women's Championship
Gold medal – first place	1998 Bismark
Gold medal – first place	2001 Madison
Silver medal – second place	1997 Seattle
Silver medal – second place	2002 Eveleth
US Olympic Trials
Gold medal – first place	2001 Ogden
Bronze medal – third place	1997 Duluth

Kari Erickson (born December 18, 1971, as Kari Liapis) is an American curler and Olympian.

== Career ==
Erickson started curling in 1988 and had a successful junior career, winning the Minnesota State Junior Championship five years in a row, 1989–1993. Three of those years she went on to win the United States Junior Championship (1990, 1992, 1993). Winning the US Championship allowed her to represent the United States at the World Junior Championships, at which she finished 5th, 2nd, and 3rd, respectively.

In 1994 Erickson made her first appearance at the United States Women's Championship, making it to the semifinals. After a few year gap she returned to the National Championship five more times in a six year span: 1997 (2nd), 1998 (1st), 1999, 2001 (1st), 2002 (2nd). As US Champion in 1998 and 2001 she represented the United States at the World Women's Championships, finishing 7th in 1998 and 5th in 2001.

She has twice competed at the US Olympic Trials, finishing third in 1998 and first in 2001. At the 2002 Winter Olympics in Salt Lake City the Erickson team had a 6–3 record at the end of the round robin. The United States team lost to Switzerland in the semifinals and Canada in the bronze medal match to finish 4th. Erickson's Olympic team included her sister Stacey Liapis at second and her dad Mike Liapis as coach.

== Personal life ==
Erickson is the sister of Stacey Liapis. She is married to Darren Erickson and has two children.

== Teams ==
Season	Skip	Third	Second	Lead	Alternate	Coach	Events
1988–89	Kari Liapis	Stacey Liapis	Heidi Rollheiser	Roberta Breyen			1989 USJCC (silver)
1989–90	Kari Liapis	Stacey Liapis	Heidi Rollheiser	Roberta Breyen	Julie Breyen		1990 USJCC (gold); 1990 WJCC (6th)
1990–91	Kari Liapis	Stacey Liapis	Tracy Lindgren	Roberta Breyen			1991 USJCC (SF)
1991–92	Erika Brown	Kari Liapis	Stacey Liapis	Roberta Breyen	Debbie Henry		1992 USJCC (gold); 1992 WJCC (silver)
1992–93	Erika Brown	Kari Liapis	Stacey Liapis	Debbie Henry	Analissa Johnson		1993 USJCC (gold); 1993 WJCC (bronze)
1997–98	Kari Erickson	Lori Kreklau	Stacey Liapis	Ann Swisshelm	Risa O'Connell	Mike Liapis	1998 USWCC (gold); 1998 WWCC (9th)
2000–01	Kari Erickson	Debbie McCormick	Stacey Liapis	Ann Swisshelm	Joni Cotten	Mike Liapis	2001 USWCC (gold); 2001 WWCC (6th)
2001–02	Kari Erickson	Debbie McCormick	Stacey Liapis	Ann Swisshelm	Joni Cotten	Mike Liapis	2001 USOCT (gold); 2002 USWCC (silver); 2002 OG (4th)
