= Lori Mountford =

American curler (born 1959)

- Curler
- Other names: Lori Ann Mountford
- Born: July 31, 1959 (age 67); Portage, Wisconsin, U.S.

Curling career
- World Championship: 3 (1992,1995, 1996)
- Olympic: 2 (1988, 1998)
Medal record
Women's curling
Representing United States
World Curling Championships
Silver medal – second place	1992 Garmisch-Partenkirchen
Silver medal – second place	1996 Hamilton
United States National Championships
Gold medal – first place	1992 Grafton
Gold medal – first place	1995 Appleton
Gold medal – first place	1996 Bemidji
United States Olympic Curling Trials
Gold medal – first place	1987 St Paul
Gold medal – first place	1997 Duluth

Lori Ann Mountford (born July 31, 1959) is an American curler. Born in Portage, Wisconsin, she graduated from Poynette High School and started curling at age 20 at Madison Curling Club. Mountford is a two-time Olympian, competing the 1988 Winter Olympics when curling was first re-introduced as an exhibition sport and then again at the 1998 Winter Olympics when curling was a full event. Her team, skipped by Lisa Schoeneberg, placed 5th both times.

Mountford was inducted into the United States Curling Association Hall of Fame in 2016.

== Teams ==
Season	Skip	Third	Second	Lead	Alternate	Coach	Events
1987–88	Lisa Schoeneberg	Erika Brown	Carla Casper	Lori Mountford			1987 USOCT (gold); 1988 OG (5th)
1990–91	Lisa Schoeneberg	Erika Brown	Lori Mountford	Jill Jones	Vicki Bodeen		
1991–92	Lisa Schoeneberg	Amy Hatten-Wright	Lori Mountford	Jill Jones			1992 USWCC (gold); 1992 WWCC (silver)
1992–93	Erika Brown	Lori Mountford	Debbie Henry	Tracy Sachtjen	Diane Brown		
1993–94	Lisa Schoeneberg	Amy Wright	Lori Mountford	Marcia Tillisch			
1994–95	Lisa Schoeneberg	Erika Brown	Lori Mountford	Marcia Tillisch	Allison Darragh		1995 USWCC (gold); 1995 WWCC (6th)
1995–96	Lisa Schoeneberg	Erika Brown	Lori Mountford	Allison Darragh	Debbie Henry		1996 USWCC (gold); 1996 WWCC (silver)
1997–98	Lisa Schoeneberg	Erika Brown	Debbie Henry	Lori Mountford	Stacey Liapis	Steve Brown	1997 USOCT (gold); 1998 OG (5th)
