= United States Junior Curling Championships =

American junior curling event

- Established: 1974 (men); 1987 (women)
- 2026 host city: Wayland, Massachusetts (men); Bowling Green, Ohio (women)
- 2026 arena: Broomstones Curling Club (men); Bowling Green Curling Club (men)

Current champions (2026)
- Men: (Minnesota) Caden Hebert
- Women: (Massachusetts) Julia Pekowitz

The United States Junior Curling Championships are annual national curling championships for men and women under the age of 21. The championships act as a qualifier for the World Junior Curling Championships. Teams qualify to compete in the national junior championships through winning qualifying events. The US Junior National Curling Championships are one of the 12 Championship Events of USA Curling.

== Past champions ==
=== Men ===
Year	Site	Winning club	Skip	Third	Second	Lead	Finish at Worlds
1974	Arden Hills, MN	(Minnesota) Hibbing, MN	Gary Kleffman	Jerry Scott	Rick Novak	Ben Gardeski	5th
1975	Madison, WI	(Minnesota) Hibbing, MN	Steve Penoncello	Rick Novak	Ben Gardeski	Ken Baehr	5th
1976	Wilmette, IL	(North Dakota) Grand Forks, ND	Don Barcome Jr.	Dale Mueller	Earl Barcome	Gary Mueller	6th
1977	Detroit, MI	(North Dakota) Grand Forks, ND	Don Barcome Jr.	Dale Mueller	Gary Mueller	Earl Barcome	Bronze
1978	Seattle, WA	(Washington (state)) Seattle, WA	Jeff Tomlinson	Ted Purvis	Curt Fish	Marc McCartney	5th
1979	Wayland, MA	(North Dakota) Grand Forks, ND	Don Barcome Jr.	Randy Darling	Bobby Stalker	Earl Barcome	Gold
1980	Colorado Springs, CO	(North Dakota) Devils Lake, ND	Scott Dalziel	Todd Dalziel	Scott Gerrard	Paul Thompson	4th
1981	Superior, WI	(Washington (state)) Seattle, WA	Ted Purvis	Dale Risling	Milt Best	Dean Risling	Bronze
1982	Highland Park, IL	(Washington (state)) Seattle, WA	Dale Risling	Milt Best	Rob Foster	Jim Foster	4th
1983	Seattle, WA	(North Dakota) Rolla, ND	Al Edwards	Mark Larson	Kenny Mickelson	Dana Westemeier	4th
1984	St. Paul, MN	(North Dakota) Rolla, ND	Al Edwards	Mark Larson	Dewey Basley	Kurt Disher	Gold
1985	Chicago, IL	(Washington (state)) Seattle, WA	Rodger Schnee	Kelly Yalowicki	Shane Way	Mark Lundgren	6th
1986	Bowling Green, OH	(North Dakota) Cavalier, ND	Scott Brown	Darin Holt	Perry Hillman	Darren Kress	8th
1987	Medford, WI	(North Dakota) Grafton, ND	Darren Kress	Bret Davis	Duane McGregor	Connor Oihus	6th
1988	Rochester, NY	(Wisconsin) Poynette, WI	Will Marquardt	Jim Falk	Jeff Falk	Kurt Marquardt	5th
1989	Duluth, MN	(Wisconsin) Poynette, WI	Kurt Marquardt	Jeff Falk	Dan Thurston	Mike Thurston	6th
1990	Exmoor-North Shore, IL	(Wisconsin) Poynette, WI	Kurt Marquardt	Jeff Falk	Dan Thurston	Mike Thurston	7th
1991	Bemidji, MN	(Minnesota) Bemidji, MN	Eric Fenson	Shawn Rojeski	Kevin Bergstrom	Ted McCann	Bronze
1992	Seattle, WA	(Minnesota) Bemidji, MN	Eric Fenson	Shawn Rojeski	Kevin Bergstrom	Ted McCann	5th
1993	Portage/Poynette, WI	(Minnesota) Hibbing, MN	Garrett Paine	Kevin Kosel	Danny Hadrava	Joel Koski	9th
1994	Madison, WI	(Wisconsin) Centerville, WI	Mike Peplinski	Craig Brown	Ryan Braudt	Cory Ward	Bronze
1995	Hibbing, MN	(Wisconsin) Centerville, WI	Mike Peplinski	Craig Brown	Ryan Braudt	Cory Ward	5th
1996	Schenectady, NY	(Washington (state)) Seattle, WA	Travis Way	Troy Schroeder	Owen Bunstein	Brandon Way	6th
1997	Chicago, IL	(Minnesota) Bemidji, MN	Matt Stevens	Craig Brown	Bob Liapis	Jeremy Fogelson	9th
1998	Kettle Moraine, WI	(Nebraska) Aksarben, NE	Andy Roza	Steve Jaixen	Kevin Jordan	Chris Becher, Scott Jordan	5th
1999	Waupaca, WI	(Nebraska) Aksarben, NE	Andy Roza	Steve Jaixen	Kevin Jordan	Chris Becher, Scott Jordan	Bronze
2000	Bemidji, MN	(Minnesota) Bemidji, MN	Randy Baird	Phill Drobnick	Chase Jackson	Cody Stevens	6th
2001	Rochester, NY	(Nebraska) Aksarben, NE	Andy Roza	Steve Jaixen	Chris Becher	Scott Jordan	Bronze
2002	Kettle Moraine, WI	(Alaska) Fairbanks, AK	Leo Johnson	Colin Hufman	Martin Sather	Christopher Benshoof	8th
2003	Wayland, MA	(Minnesota) Hibbing, MN	Jesse Gates	Jeff Thune	Kevin Johnson	Shane McKinlay	DNQ
2004	Centerville, WI	(Minnesota) Chisholm, MN	John Shuster	Jason Smith	Kevin Johnson	Shane McKinlay	DNQ
2005	Bismarck, ND	(Minnesota) Chisholm, MN	Kris Perkovich	Jason Smith	Jeff Isaacson	Kevin Johnson	4th
2006	Duluth, MN	(Minnesota) Duluth, MN	Chris Plys	Matt Mielke	Kevin Johnson	Tommy Kent/Aaron Wald	8th
2007	Seattle, WA	(Minnesota) Duluth, MN	Chris Plys	Aanders Brorson	Matt Perushek	Joel Cooper (Note: Cooper is now known as JayCee due to gender transition.)	5th
2008	Portage, WI	(Minnesota) Duluth, MN	Chris Plys	Aanders Brorson	Matt Perushek	Matt Hamilton	Gold
2009	Devil's Lake, ND	(Minnesota) Duluth, MN	Chris Plys	Aanders Brorson	Matt Perushek	Matt Hamilton	Bronze
2010	Bemidji, MN	(Washington (state)) Seattle, WA	Sean Beighton	Derrick McLean	Sam Galey	Joseph Purvis	9th
2011	Fairbanks, AK	(Minnesota) Chisholm, MN	Aaron Wald	Joshua Bahr	Jared Zezel	John Muller	6th
2012	Madison, WI	(Massachusetts) Southborough, MA	Stephen Dropkin	Korey Dropkin	Thomas Howell	Derek Corbett	5th
2013	Wayland, MA	(Massachusetts) Southborough, MA	Korey Dropkin	Thomas Howell	Mark Fenner	Alex Fenson	7th
2014	Seattle, WA	(Washington (state)) Seattle, WA	Jake Vukich	Evan McAuley	Luc Violette	Kyle Lorvick	9th
2015	Devil's Lake, ND	(Minnesota) Duluth, MN	Ethan Meyers	Quinn Evenson	Steven Szemple	William Pryor	5th
2016	Willmar, MN	(Minnesota) Blaine, MN	Korey Dropkin	Thomas Howell	Mark Fenner	Alex Fenson	Silver
2017	Fargo, ND	(New York (state)) Ardsley, NY	Andrew Stopera	Luc Violette	Ben Richardson	Graem Fenson	Silver
2018	Ferndale, MI	(New York (state)) Ardsley, NY	Andrew Stopera	Luc Violette	Ben Richardson	Graem Fenson	4th
2019	Two Harbors, MN	(New York (state)) Ardsley, NY	Andrew Stopera	Luc Violette	Ben Richardson	Graem Fenson	5th
2020	Eau Claire, WI	(Washington (state)) Seattle, WA	Luc Violette	Ben Richardson	Jon Harstad	Graem Fenson	7th
2021	Chaska, MN	(New York (state)) Ardsley, NY	Daniel Casper	Ethan Sampson	Sam Strouse	Coleman Thurston, Marius Kleinas	6th
2022	Plover, WI	(North Dakota) Fargo, ND	Ethan Sampson	Kevin Tuma	Coleman Thurston	Marius Kleinas	7th
2023	Wayland, MA	(Wisconsin) Wausau, WI	Wesley Wendling	Kevin Tuma	Chris Kirsch	Jackson Armstrong	4th
2024	Eau Claire, WI	(Massachusetts) Cape Cod, MA	Wesley Wendling	Nicholas Cenzalli	Daniel Laufer	Shaheen Bassiri/Dylan Ciapka	9th
2025	Bowling Green, OH	(Wisconsin) Eau Claire, WI	Caden Hebert	Jackson Bestland	Benji Paral	Jack Wendtland	Gold
2026	Bismarck, ND	(Wisconsin) Eau Claire, WI	Caden Hebert	Jackson Bestland	Benji Paral	Jack Wendtland	

=== Women ===
Year	Site	Winning club	Skip	Third	Second	Lead	Finish at Worlds
1987	Madison, WI	(Wisconsin) Lodi, WI	Tracy Zeman	Pam Goetz	Shellie Holerud	Lori Myers	
1988	Grafton, ND	(Wisconsin) Lodi, WI	Tracy Zeman	Erika Brown	Marni Vaningan	Shellie Holerud	6th
1989	Duluth, MN	(Wisconsin) Lodi, WI	Erika Brown	Tracy Zeman	Shellie Holerud	Jill Jones	6th
1990	Exmoor-North Shore, IL	(Minnesota) Bemdji, MN	Kari Liapis	Stacey Liapis	Heidi Rollheiser	Bobbie Breyen	5th
1991	Bemidji, MN	(Wisconsin) Madison, WI	Erika Brown	Jill Jones	Shellie Holerud	Debbie Henry	5th
1992	Seattle, WA	(Minnesota) Bemidji, MN	Erika Brown	Kari Liapis	Stacey Liapis	Bobbie Breyen, Debbie Henry	Silver
1993	Portage/Poynette, WI	(Minnesota) Bemidji, MN	Erika Brown	Kari Liapis	Stacey Liapis	Debbie Henry	Bronze
1994	Madison, WI	(Wisconsin) Madison, WI	Erika Brown	Debbie Henry	Stacey Liapis	Analissa Johnson, Allison Darragh	Silver
1995	Hibbing, MN	(Minnesota) Bemidji, MN	Risa O'Connell	Missi O'Connell	Natalie Simenson	Alison Naylor	6th
1996	Schenectady, NY	(Nebraska) Omaha, NE	Amy Becher	Theresa Faltesek	Monica Carlson	Heather Miller	10th
1997	Chicago, IL	(Minnesota) Bemidji, MN	Risa O'Connell	Amy Becher	Natalie Simenson	Missi O'Connell	4th
1998	Kettle Moraine, WI	(Minnesota) Bemidji, MN	Hope Schmitt	Nikki Baird	Katie Schmitt	Teresa Bahr	5th
1999	Waupaca, WI	(Minnesota) Bemidji, MN	Hope Schmitt	Nikki Baird	Katie Schmitt	Teresa Bahr	5th
2000	Bemidji, MN	(Wisconsin) Madison, WI	Laura Delaney	Nicole Joraanstad	Kirsten Finch	Rebecca Dobie	Bronze
2001	Rochester, NY	(Wisconsin) Madison, WI	Nicole Joraanstad	Kirsten Finch	Katie Schmitt	Rebecca Dobie	6th
2002	Kettle Moraine, WI	(Minnesota) Bemidji, MN	Cassie Johnson	Jamie Johnson	Katie Beck	Maureen Brunt	Gold
2003	Broomstones, MA	(Minnesota) Bemidji, MN	Cassie Johnson	Katie Beck	Becky Dobie	Maureen Brunt	Silver
2004	Centerville, WI	(Minnesota) Duluth, MN	Aileen Sormunen	Courtney George	Amanda Jensen	Amanda McLean	4th
2005	Bismarck, ND	(North Dakota) Bismarck, ND	Gillian Gervais	Sarah Gervais	Stephanie Jensen	Stephanie Sambor, Amy Hultstrand	10th
2006	Duluth, MN	(Wisconsin) Madison, WI	Nina Spatola	Megan O'Connell	Jackie Mueller	Jordan Moulton	10th
2007	Seattle, WA	(Minnesota) Duluth, MN	Aileen Sormunen	Courtney George	Molly Bonner	Jordan Moulton	4th
2008	Portage, WI	(Wisconsin) Madison, WI	Nina Spatola	Becca Hamilton	Anna Plys	Jenna Haag	8th
2009	Devil's Lake, ND	(Minnesota) St. Paul, MN	Alexandra Carlson	Tabitha Peterson	Tara Peterson	Sophie Brorson	5th
2010	Bemidji, MN	(Minnesota) St. Paul, MN	Alexandra Carlson	Tabitha Peterson	Tara Peterson	Sophie Brorson	Bronze
2011	Fairbanks, AK	(Wisconsin) Madison, WI	Rebecca Hamilton	Tara Peterson	Karlie Koenig	Sophie Brorson	5th
2012	Madison, WI	(Minnesota) Duluth, MN	Cory Christensen	Elizabeth Busche	Anna Bauman	Sonja Bauman	10th
2013	Wayland, MA	(Minnesota) Cohasset, MN	Miranda Solem	Vicky Persinger	Karlie Koenig	Chelsea Solem	7th
2014	Seattle, WA	(Minnesota) Duluth, MN	Cory Christensen	Mackenzie Lank	Anna Bauman	Anna Hopkins, Sonja Bauman	6th
2015	Devils Lake, ND	(Minnesota) Blaine, MN	Cory Christensen	Sarah Anderson	Mackenzie Lank	Jenna Haag, Taylor Anderson	5th
2016	Willmar, MN	(Minnesota) Blaine, MN	Cory Christensen	Sarah Anderson	Taylor Anderson	Madison Bear, Christine McMakin	Silver
2017	Fargo, ND	(Minnesota) Blaine, MN	Annmarie Dubberstein	Christine McMakin	Jenna Burchesky	Allison Howell	7th
2018	Ferndale, MI	(Wisconsin) Pardeeville, WI	Madison Bear	Annmarie Dubberstein	Jenna Burchesky	Allison Howell	5th
2019	Two Harbors, MN	(Minnesota) Mankato, MN	Cait Flannery	Leah Yavarow	Lexi Lanigan	Rebecca Miles	8th
2020	Eau Claire, WI	(Michigan) Midland, MI	Delaney Strouse	Sydney Mullaney	Susan Dudt	Rebecca Rodgers	DNQ
2021	Chaska, MN	(Michigan) Midland, MI	Delaney Strouse	Leah Yavarow	Sydney Mullaney	Susan Dudt	Bronze
2022	Plover, WI	(Wisconsin) Portage, WI	Miranda Scheel	Jordan Hein	Tessa Thurlow	Amelia Hintz, Anna Tamboli	7th
2023	Wayland, MA	(Wisconsin) Eau Claire, WI	Miranda Scheel	Jordan Hein	Tessa Thurlow	Amelia Hintz	DNQ
2024	Eau Claire, WI	(Minnesota) St. Paul, MN	Allie Giroux	Tessa Thurlow	Ella Fleming	Brooke Giroux	DNQ
2025	Bowling Green, OH	(Minnesota) Blaine, MN	Allory Johnson	Gianna Johnson	Morgan Zacher	Bailey Vaydich	4th
2026	Bismarck, ND	(Massachusetts) Boston, MA	Julia Pekowitz	Kalina Petrova	Lila Farwell	Alexandra Pekowitz	
