= Neil Murdoch =

Scottish curler

- Curler
- Born: 22 November 1972 (age 53); Dumfries, Scotland

Curling career
- World Championship: 1 (2005)
- European Championship: 2 (2003, 2004)
Medal record
Men's curling
Representing Scotland
World Championships
Silver medal – second place	2005 Victoria
World Junior Championships
Gold medal – first place	1993 Grindelwald
European Championships
Gold medal – first place	2003 Courmayeur

Neil Murdoch (born 22 November 1972, in Dumfries) is a Scottish curler from nearby Lockerbie. Murdoch is a former European curling champion.

== Sporting career ==
Neil Murdoch won the 2003 European Championships, as second for Scotland skip David Murdoch. Neil played third for Scotland skip Craig Wilson at the 1993 (gold medalist) and 1994 World Juniors. He was also a member of Team Europe at the 2004 Continental Cup in Medicine Hat.

At the 2005 World Championships, Murdoch again played second for his brother David. Team Scotland earned the silver medal, losing to Team Canada in the final.

== Personal life ==
Neil Murdoch is the brother of World Curling Champion David Murdoch and Olympic curling coach Nancy Murdoch. Murdoch is a veterinary surgeon.
