= John Gordon (curler) =

American curler

- Curler
- Born: March 27, 1958 (age 68); Ashland, Wisconsin, U.S.

Curling career
- World Championship: 3 (1995, 1996, 1999)
- Olympic: 2 (1998, 2002)
Medal record
Men's curling
Representing United States
US Men's Championship
Gold medal – first place	1995 Appleton
Gold medal – first place	1996 Bemidji
Gold medal – first place	1999 Duluth
US Olympic Trials
Silver medal – second place	1987 St. Paul
Gold medal – first place	1997 Duluth
Gold medal – first place	2001 Ogden

John Gordon (born March 27, 1958, in Ashland, Wisconsin) is an American curler. He is a two-time Olympian, having competed at the 1998 Winter Olympics in Nagano and the 2002 Winter Olympics in Salt Lake City, finishing 4th and 7th respectively. He also represented the United States at the World Curling Championships three times, finishing 4th in 1995, 6th in 1996, and 4th in 1999.

== Teams ==
1998 Winter Olympics

- Tim Somerville, Skip
- Mike Peplinski, Third
- Myles Brundidge, Second
- John Gordon, Lead

2002 Winter Olympics, 1995 World Men's Championship, 1996 World Men's Championship

- Tim Somerville, Skip
- Mike Schneeberger, Third
- Myles Brundidge, Second
- John Gordon, Lead

1999 World Men's Championship

- Tim Somerville, Skip
- Donald Barcome Jr., Third
- Myles Brundidge, Second
- John Gordon, Lead
