= Cory Ward =

American curler

- Curler ♂
- Born: April 20, 1974 (age 52); Mondovi, Wisconsin, U.S.

Team
- Curling club: Hibbing CC, Minnesota

Curling career
- Member Association: United States
- World Championship: 1 (1998)
- Other appearances: World Junior Championships: 2 (1994, 1995)
Medal record
Curling
United States Men's Championship
Gold medal – first place	1998 Bismarck
Silver medal – second place	2000 Ogden
Bronze medal – third place	2001 Madison

Cory Ward (born April 20, 1974, in Mondovi, Wisconsin) is an American curler.

At the national level, he is a 1998 United States men's champion curler.

== Teams ==
Season	Skip	Third	Second	Lead	Alternate	Coach	Events
1993–94	Mike Peplinski	Craig Brown	Ryan Braudt	Cory Ward	Ryan Quinn		1994 WJCC (bronze)
1994–95	Mike Peplinski	Craig Brown	Ryan Braudt	Cory Ward	Ryan Quinn		1995 WJCC (5th)
1997–98	Paul Pustovar	Dave Violette	Greg Wilson	Cory Ward	Shawn Rojeski (WCC)	Bill Tschirhart	1998 USMCC (gold); 1998 WCC (6th)
1999–00	Paul Pustovar	Dave Violette	Mike Peplinski	Cory Ward	Greg Wilson		2000 USMCC (silver)
2000–01	Paul Pustovar	Mike Peplinski	Dave Violette	Cory Ward	Doug Anderson		2001 USMCC (bronze)
2001–02	Paul Pustovar	Mike Peplinski	Dave Violette	Cory Ward	Doug Anderson	Mike Liapis	2001 USOCT (4th)
2001–02	Craig Brown	Doug Pottinger	Jon Brunt	John Dunlop	Cory Ward	Steve Brown	USMCC 2002 (3rd)
2002–03	Ryan Quinn	Cory Ward	Jon Brunt	Doug Anderson			
2003–04	Craig Brown	Ryan Quinn	Cory Ward	Mitch Marks			

== Personal life ==
Cory Ward started curling in 1982 at the age of 8.

He is married and has two children.
