= 1993 World Junior Curling Championships =

- Host city: Grindelwald, Switzerland
- Dates: 21–27 March
- Men's winner: Scotland (6th title)
- Skip: Craig Wilson
- Third: Neil Murdoch
- Second: Ricky Burnett
- Lead: Craig Strawhorn
- Alternate: Stuart Byers
- Coach: Robin Halliday
- Finalist: Canada (Michel Ferland)
- Women's winner: Scotland (3rd title)
- Skip: Kirsty Hay
- Third: Gillian Barr
- Second: Joanna Pegg
- Lead: Louise Wilkie
- Alternate: Fiona Brown
- Finalist: Canada (Amber Holland)

The 1993 World Junior Curling Championships were held from 21 to 27 March in Grindelwald, Switzerland.

== Men ==
=== Teams ===
Country	Skip	Third	Second	Lead	Alternate	Coach
Canada	Michel Ferland	Marco Berthelot	Steve Beaudry	Steve Guetre	Philippe Lemay	
Denmark	Torkil Svensgaard	Lasse Damm	Kenny Tordrup	Carsten Svensgaard	Rene Hojbjerg	
England	Donald Doull	Bruce Bowyer	Mark Wilkinson	Mark Copperwheat	Richard Hills	Stephen Hinds
France	Spencer Mugnier	Thomas Dufour	Sylvain Ducroz	Philippe Caux	Cyrille Prunet	
Germany	Markus Herberg	Daniel Herberg	Stephan Knoll	Markus Messenzehl	Oliver Trevisiol	
Japan	Takashi Hara	Seiji Asano	Makoto Shirahata	Hidetaka Sunaga	Yoshinari Suzuki	
Scotland	Craig Wilson	Neil Murdoch	Ricky Burnett	Craig Strawhorn	Stuart Byers	Robin Halliday
Sweden	Per Granqvist	Emil Marklund	Peter Hillbom	Emil Nordkvist	Rickard Hallström	
Switzerland	Yannick Renggli	Chrislian Razafimahefa	Gregory Renggli	Patrick Tinembart	Dominic Andres	
United States	Garrett Paine	Kevin Kosel	Danny Hadrava	Joel Koski	Sam Harms	

=== Round Robin ===
Key
Teams to Playoffs
Teams to Tiebreaker for 3rd and 4th places
Teams to Tiebreaker for 6th place

Place	Country	1	2	3	4	5	6	7	8	9	10	Wins	Losses
1	Canada	*	6:2	8:3	9:4	6:7	6:4	10:2	11:4	11:2	9:4	8	1
2	Scotland	2:6	*	4:3	10:6	7:2	9:8	4:8	10:3	5:3	9:5	7	2
3	France	3:8	3:4	*	2:7	8:2	6:2	9:4	8:2	8:3	11:4	6	3
3	Germany	4:9	6:10	7:2	*	11:6	6:10	7:6	7:4	7:6	8:4	6	3
3	Switzerland	7:6	2:7	2:8	6:11	*	6:5	5:2	11:3	6:5	11:3	6	3
6	Sweden	4:6	8:9	2:6	10:6	5:6	*	9:1	7:10	7:6	11:5	4	5
6	Denmark	2:10	8:4	4:9	6:7	2:5	1:9	*	7:3	7:4	12:1	4	5
8	England	4:11	3:10	2:8	4:7	3:11	10:7	3:7	*	13:4	10:4	3	6
9	United States	2:11	3:5	3:8	6:7	5:6	6:7	4:7	4:13	*	5:6	1	8
10	Japan	4:9	5:9	4:11	4:8	3:11	5:11	1:12	4:10	6:5	*	0	9

==== Tiebreakers ====
For playoffs from 3rd and 4th places:

Round 1 (winner to playoffs from 3rd place, loser to Round 2)		Round 2 (winner to playoffs from 4th place, loser out to 5th place)
		Germany	7
France	9	Switzerland	6
Germany	7

For 6th place:

.
Sweden	6
Denmark	4

=== Playoffs ===
Semifinals
1	Canada	9
4	Germany	8
2	Scotland	4
3	France	2

Gold Medal Game
1	Canada	3
2	Scotland	7

=== Rankings ===
Place	Country	Games	Wins	Losses
1st place, gold medalist(s)	Scotland	11	9	2
2nd place, silver medalist(s)	Canada	11	9	2
3rd place, bronze medalist(s)	France	11	7	4
3rd place, bronze medalist(s)	Germany	12	7	5
5	Switzerland	10	6	4
6	Sweden	10	5	5
7	Denmark	10	4	6
8	England	9	3	6
9	United States	9	1	8
10	Japan	9	0	9

== Women ==
=== Teams ===
Country	Skip	Third	Second	Lead	Alternate	Coach
Canada	Amber Holland	Cindy Street	Tracy Beach	Angela Street	Marcia McKenzie	
Denmark	Dorthe Holm	Angelina Jensen	Margit Pörtner	Helene Jensen	Kamilla Schack	
Finland	Sari Suvanto (4th)	Kirsi Nykänen (skip)	Jaana Hämäläinen	Heli Jalkanen		
France	Gaetane Bibollet	Aurore Vuillemin	Severine Bibollet	Vanessa Muller	Veronique Gannaz	Thierry Mercier
Japan	Mika Yoda	Takako Morlizumi	Yuka Kobayashi	Ayako Uchibori	Shiho Kobayashi	
Norway	Marianne Haslum	Kristin Løvseth	Elisabeth Sandberg	Hege Korstadshagen	Ellen Kittelsen	Thoralf Hognestad
Scotland	Kirsty Hay	Gillian Barr	Joanna Pegg	Louise Wilkie	Fiona Brown	
Sweden	Ulrika Bergman (4th)	Margaretha Lindahl (skip)	Anna Bergström	Elenor Mattsson	Maria "Mia" Zackrisson	
Switzerland	Caroline Gruss	Magali Pont	Sylvie Meillaud	Nancy Guignard	Manuela Kormann	
United States	Erika Brown	Kari Liapis	Stacey Liapis	Debbie Henry	Analissa Johnson	

=== Round Robin ===
Key
Teams to Playoffs

Place	Country	1	2	3	4	5	6	7	8	9	10	Wins	Losses
1	Scotland	*	9:6	7:5	11:7	8:5	12:3	8:9	12:2	9:8	13:1	8	1
2	Canada	6:9	*	9:7	4:11	10:9	10:5	9:1	12:5	8:5	7:4	7	2
3	Denmark	5:7	7:9	*	7:3	6:5	10:6	9:8	4:8	5:3	10:4	6	3
4	United States	7:11	11:4	3:7	*	9:8	4:6	13:2	14:2	10:3	14:3	6	3
5	Sweden	5:8	9:10	5:6	8:9	*	11:5	10:9	8:3	9:3	9:3	5	4
6	Norway	3:12	5:10	6:10	6:4	5:11	*	8:3	15:4	10:5	9:3	5	4
7	Finland	9:8	1:9	8:9	2:13	9:10	3:8	*	10:7	10:9	11:5	4	5
8	France	2:12	5:12	8:4	2:14	3:8	4:15	7:10	*	14:1	10:5	3	6
8	Switzerland	8:9	5:8	3:5	3:10	3:9	5:10	9:10	1:14	*	10:6	1	8
10	Japan	1:13	4:7	4:10	3:14	3:9	3:9	5:11	5:10	6:10	*	0	9

=== Playoffs ===
Semifinals
1	Scotland	11
4	United States	5
2	Canada	12
3	Denmark	4

Gold Medal Game
1	Scotland	9
2	Canada	5

=== Rankings ===
Place	Country	Games	Wins	Losses
1st place, gold medalist(s)	Scotland	11	10	1
2nd place, silver medalist(s)	Canada	11	8	3
3rd place, bronze medalist(s)	Denmark	10	6	4
3rd place, bronze medalist(s)	United States	10	6	4
5	Sweden	9	5	4
6	Norway	9	5	4
7	Finland	9	4	5
8	France	9	3	6
9	Switzerland	9	1	8
10	Japan	9	0	9

== Awards ==
WJCC All-Star Team:

	Skip	Third	Second	Lead
Men	(Canada) Michel Ferland	(Canada) Marco Berthelot	(Sweden) Peter Hillbom	(Scotland) Craig Strawhorn
Women	(Scotland) Kirsty Hay	(United States) Kari Liapis	(Scotland) Joanna Pegg	(Canada) Angela Street

WJCC Sportsmanship Award:

Men	(Japan) Takashi Hara
Women	(Denmark) Dorthe Holm

== Sources ==
- Men's results from the World Curling Federation
- Women's results from the World Curling Federation
