= United States Olympic curling trials =

North American Olympic sport trials

United States Olympic Curling Trials
- Established: 1987
- 2025 host city: Sioux Falls, SD
- 2025 arena: Denny Sanford Premier Center

Current champions (2025)
- Men: (Minnesota) Team Casper
- Women: (Minnesota) Team Peterson

Current edition
- 2025 United States Olympic Curling Trials

The United States Olympic curling trials take place to decide the curling team to represent the United States at each Winter Olympics.

== Past winners ==
=== Men ===
Year	Site	Winning club	Skip	Third	Second	Lead	Fifth	Finish at Olympics
1987	St. Paul, MN	Superior CC, Superior, WI	Bob Nichols	Bud Somerville	Tom Locken	Bob Christman		4th
1991	Hibbing, MN	Superior CC, Superior, WI	Tim Somerville	Mike Strum	Bud Somerville	Bill Strum		(bronze) Bronze
1997	Duluth, MN	Superior CC, Superior, WI	Tim Somerville	Mike Peplinski	Myles Brundidge	John Gordon		4th
2001	Ogden, UT	Superior CC, Superior, WI	Tim Somerville	Mike Schneeberger	Myles Brundidge	John Gordon	Don Barcome, Jr.	7th
2005	Madison, WI	Bemidji CC, Bemidji, MN	Pete Fenson	Shawn Rojeski	Joe Polo	John Shuster	Scott Baird	(bronze) Bronze
2009	Broomfield, CO	Duluth CC, Duluth, MN	John Shuster	Jason Smith	Jeff Isaacson	John Benton	Ryan Lemke	8th
2013	Fargo, ND	Duluth CC, Duluth, MN	John Shuster	Jeff Isaacson	Jared Zezel	John Landsteiner	Craig Brown	9th
2017	Omaha, NE	Duluth CC, Duluth, MN	John Shuster	Tyler George	Matt Hamilton	John Landsteiner		(gold) Gold
2021	Omaha, NE	Duluth CC, Duluth, MN	John Shuster	Chris Plys	Matt Hamilton	John Landsteiner		4th
2025	Sioux Falls, SD	Chaska CC, Chaska, MN	Daniel Casper	Luc Violette	Ben Richardson	Aidan Oldenburg	Rich Ruohonen	5th

=== Women ===
Year	Site	Winning club	Skip	Third	Second	Lead	Fifth	Finish at Olympics
1987	St. Paul, MN	Madison CC, Madison, WI	Lisa Schoeneberg	Carla Casper	Lori Mountford	Erika Brown		5th
1997	Duluth, MN	Madison CC, Madison, WI	Lisa Schoeneberg	Erika Brown	Debbie Henry	Lori Mountford		5th
2001	Ogden, UT	Bemidji CC, Bemidji, MN	Kari Erickson	Debbie McCormick	Stacey Liapis	Ann Swisshelm	Joni Cotten	4th
2005	Madison, WI	Bemidji CC, Bemidji, MN	Cassie Johnson	Jamie Johnson	Jessica Schultz	Maureen Brunt	Courtney George	8th
2009	Broomfield, CO	Madison CC, Madison, WI	Debbie McCormick	Allison Pottinger	Nicole Joraanstad	Natalie Nicholson	Tracy Sachtjen	10th
2013	Fargo, ND	Madison CC, Madison, WI	Erika Brown	Debbie McCormick	Jessica Schultz	Ann Swisshelm	Allison Pottinger	10th
2017	Omaha, NE	Blaine CC, Blaine, MN	Nina Roth	Tabitha Peterson	Aileen Geving	Becca Hamilton		8th
2021	Omaha, NE	St. Paul CC, St. Paul, MN	Tabitha Peterson	Nina Roth	Becca Hamilton	Tara Peterson	Aileen Geving	6th
2025	Sioux Falls, SD	St. Paul Curling Club, St. Paul, MN	Tabitha Peterson	Cory Thiesse	Tara Peterson	Taylor Anderson-Heide		4th

=== Mixed doubles ===
United States Mixed Doubles Olympic Curling Trials
- Established: 2017
- 2025 host city: Lafayette, Colorado
- 2025 arena: Rock Creek Curling
- 2025 champion: (Minnesota) Cory Thiesse / Korey Dropkin

Current edition
- 2025 United States Mixed Doubles Curling Olympic Trials

Year	Site	Female	Male	Finish at Olympics
2017	Blaine, MN	Becca Hamilton	Matt Hamilton	6th
2021 (Note: The 2021 trials were originally announced to be held in Irvine, California, but less than a month before they were to begin the decision was made to move them to Eveleth, Minnesota, due to the ongoing COVID-19 pandemic.)	Eveleth, MN	Vicky Persinger	Chris Plys	8th
2025	Lafayette, CO	Cory Thiesse	Korey Dropkin	(silver) Silver
