= Tim Somerville =

American curler

- Curler
- Born: September 14, 1960 (age 66); Superior, Wisconsin, U.S.

Curling career
- World Championship: 3 (1995, 1996, 1999)
- Olympic: 3 (1992, 1998, 2002)
Medal record
Men's curling
Representing United States
Winter Olympics
Bronze medal – third place	1992 Albertville
US Men's Championship
Gold medal – first place	1995 Appleton
Gold medal – first place	1996 Bemidji
Gold medal – first place	1999 Duluth
US Olympic Trials
Gold medal – first place	1991 Hibbing
Gold medal – first place	1997 Duluth
Gold medal – first place	2001 Ogden

Tim Somerville (born September 14, 1960) is an American curler from Coon Rapids, Minnesota. He is a three-time Olympian. He won the bronze medal at the 1992 Winter Games when curling was an exhibition event.

== Curling career ==
As a junior curler, Somerville was a four-time Wisconsin state junior champion, 1979–82. After this run of junior championships, he joined his father Bud's men's team and won the Wisconsin state men's championship in back-to-back years, 1983 and 1984. Still playing with his father, he won the bronze medal at the 1992 Winter Olympics in Albertville, France, where curling was still an exhibition event.

After the 1992 Winter Games, Somerville returned to skipping his own team, to great success. He won the United States Men's Championship three times, in 1995, 1996, and 1999. Each of those years he then represented the United States at the World Men's Championships, where he finished fourth, seventh, and fourth, respectively. He also competed at the 1998 Winter Olympics in Nagano, where the American team placed fourth, and at the 2002 Winter Olympics in Salt Lake City.

== Personal life ==
Somerville's father, Bud Somerville, was also a highly successful curler. Bud was world champion in 1965 and 1974, was skip of the 1992 bronze medal Olympic team, and the first inductee into the United States Curling Hall of Fame.

== Teams ==
Season	Skip	Third	Second	Lead	Alternate	Coach	Events
1978–79	Tim Somerville	Joe Geegan	Dewey Basley	Ken Larson			
1979–80	Tim Somerville	Joe Geegan	Dewey Basley	Ken Larson			
1980–81	Tim Somerville	Joe Geegan	Dewey Basley	Ken Larson			
1981–82	Tim Somerville	Dewey Basley	Mike Schneeberger	Dan Sitek			
1982–83	Bob Nichols (fourth)	Bud Somerville (skip)	Tim Somerville	Bob Christman			
1983–84	Bob Nichols (fourth)	Bud Somerville (skip)	Tim Somerville	Bob Christman			
1990–91	Tim Somerville (fourth)	Mike Strum	Bud Somerville (skip)	Bill Strum			1991 USOCT (gold)
1991–92	Tim Somerville (fourth)	Mike Strum	Bud Somerville (skip)	Bill Strum	Bob Nichols	Bob Buchanan	1992 OG (bronze)
1992–93	Tim Somerville	Mike Strum	Mike Schneeberger	John Gordon			1993 USMCC (4th)
1994–95	Tim Somerville	Mike Schneeberger	Myles Brundidge	John Gordon	Bud Somerville		1995 USMCC (gold); 1995 WMCC (4th)
1995–96	Tim Somerville	Mike Schneeberger	Myles Brundidge	John Gordon	Donald Barcome Jr.		1996 USMCC (gold); 1996 WMCC (7th)
1997–98	Tim Somerville	Mike Peplinski	Myles Brundidge	John Gordon	Tim Solin		1997 USOCT (gold); 1998 OG (4th)
1998–99	Tim Somerville	Donald Barcome Jr.	Myles Brundidge	John Gordon	Mark Haluptzok	Bud Somerville	1999 USMCC (gold); 1999 WMCC (4th)
1999–00	Tim Somerville	Mike Schneeberger	Myles Brundidge	John Gordon	Bud Somerville		2000 USMCC (7th)
2001–02	Tim Somerville	Mike Schneeberger	Myles Brundidge	John Gordon	Donald Barcome Jr. (OG)	Bud Somerville	2001 USOCT (gold); 2002 OG (7th); 2002 USMCC (5th)
2002–03	Tim Somerville	Mike Schneeberger	Greg Johnson	John Gordon	Dave Puleo		2003 USMCC (6th)
