= Tracy Sachtjen =

American curler

- Curler
- Born: Tracy Zeman; February 20, 1969 (age 57); Sauk Prairie, Wisconsin, U.S.

Curling career
- World Championship: 5 (1997, 1999, 2003, 2008, 2009)
- Olympic: 1 (2010)
Medal record
Women's curling
Representing the United States
World Championships
Silver medal – second place	1999 Saint John
Gold medal – first place	2003 Winnipeg
United States Olympic Curling Trials
Gold medal – first place	2009 Broomfield	Team
Silver medal – second place	2001 Ogden	Team
Silver medal – second place	2005 Madison	Team

Tracy Sachtjen (/ˈsætʃən/, née Zeman, born February 20, 1969) is an American curler from Lodi, Wisconsin. She is a former world champion and Olympian.

== Curling career ==
Sachtjen started curling in 1982. By 1987 she had made her first appearance at the U.S. Junior National Championships. Her first appearance at the United States National Championships came in 1993 and in 1997 she won her first gold medal at the event, with her team skipped by Patti Lank. At her first world championships in 1997 in Berne, Switzerland, her team placed sixth. She has competed at eight U.S. National Championships, five World Championships, and two World Junior Championships. She has one gold and one silver medal from World Championship competition.

In February 2009, Sachtjen and her team, skipped by Debbie McCormick won the 2010 US Olympic Trials, earning the right to compete for the United States at the 2010 Vancouver Olympic Games. (This event also served as the qualifier for the 2009 World Championships.)

== Teams ==
Season	Skip	Third	Second	Lead	Alternate	Coach	Events
1986–87	Tracy Zeman	Pam Goetz	Shellie Holerud	Lori Myers			1987 USJCC (gold)
1987–88	Tracy Zeman	Erika Brown	Marni Vaningan	Shellie Holerud			1988 USJCC (gold); 1988 WJCC (8th)
1988–89	Erika Brown	Tracy Zeman	Shellie Holerud	Jill Jones	Debbie Henry (WJCC)		1989 USJCC (gold); 1989 WJCC (6th)
1996–97	Patti Lank	Analissa Johnson	Joni Cotten	Tracy Sachtjen	Allison Darragh		1997 USWCC (gold); 1997 WWCC (7th)
1998–99	Patti Lank	Erika Brown	Allison Darragh	Tracy Sachtjen	Barb Perrella (WWCC)	Steve Brown	1999 USWCC (gold); 1999 WWCC (silver)
1999–00	Patti Lank	Erika Brown	Allison Pottinger	Tracy Sachtjen		Steve Brown	2000 USWCC (silver)
2000–01	Patti Lank	Erika Brown	Allison Pottinger	Tracy Sachtjen		Keith Reilly	2001 USWCC (silver)
2001–02	Patti Lank	Erika Brown Oriedo	Allison Pottinger	Tracy Sachtjen		Bev Behnke	2001 USOCT (silver)
2002–03	Debbie McCormick	Allison Pottinger	Ann Swisshelm Silver	Tracy Sachtjen	Joni Cotten	Wally Henry	2003 USWCC (gold); 2003 WWCC (gold)
2003–04	Debbie McCormick	Allison Pottinger	Ann Swisshelm Silver	Tracy Sachtjen	Joni Cotten		2004 USWCC (silver)
2004–05	Debbie McCormick	Allison Pottinger	Ann Swisshelm Silver	Tracy Sachtjen			2005 USWCC/USOCT (silver)
2005–06	Debbie McCormick	Allison Pottinger	Nicole Joraanstad	Tracy Sachtjen	Natalie Nicholson	Joni Cotten	2006 USWCC (gold)
2006–07	Debbie McCormick	Allison Pottinger	Nicole Joraanstad	Natalie Nicholson	Tracy Sachtjen		2007 USWCC (gold)
2007–08	Debbie McCormick	Allison Pottinger	Nicole Joraanstad	Natalie Nicholson	Tracy Sachtjen	Wally Henry	2008 WWCC (7th)
2008–09	Debbie McCormick	Allison Pottinger	Nicole Joraanstad	Natalie Nicholson	Tracy Sachtjen	Wally Henry	2009 USWCC/USOCT (gold); 2009 WWCC (9th)
2009–10	Debbie McCormick	Allison Pottinger	Nicole Joraanstad	Natalie Nicholson	Tracy Sachtjen	Wally Henry	2010 OG (10th)
