= Bev Behnke =

American curler

Beverly Behnke
- Curler

Team
- Curling club: Denver CC, Denver, Colorado

Curling career
- World Championship: 2 (1990,1994)
Medal record
Curling
United States National Championships
Gold medal – first place	1990 Superior
Gold medal – first place	1993 St. Paul
Gold medal – first place	1994 Duluth
Silver medal – second place	1992 Grafton
Silver medal – second place	1995 Appleton
Silver medal – second place	1996 Bemidji
Bronze medal – third place	1989 Detroit
United States Olympic Curling Trials
Silver medal – second place	1997 Duluth

Beverly Behnke is an American curler from Denver, Colorado. She was a three-time national champion in the early 1990s.

== Curling career ==
In 1990 Behnke was named the United States Curling Association's Female Athlete of the Year.

Behnke skipped her team to gold at three National Women's Championships in only a five year span, in 1990, 1993, and 1994. In 1992 they earned silver at Nationals, losing to Lisa Schoeneberg in the final. As national champions they earned the right to represent the United States at the subsequent World Championships. In 1990 and 1994 they finished in eighth and sixth place, respectively. In 1993 Behnke's team finished in eighth place as well, but Behnke missed the tournament due to an injury and instead Sharon O'Brien skipped the team.

Behnke came up short of defending her title in 1995, losing to Schoeneberg in the final again. Schoeneberg yet again beat Behnke in the final of the 1996 National Championship. Behnke's team then again finished in second place to Schoeneberg at the 1997 Olympic Trials.

At the 2001 Olympic Trials Behnke coached Patti Lank's team, who finished in second place.

== Teams ==
=== Women's ===
Season	Skip	Third	Second	Lead	Alternate	Events
1989–90	Bev Behnke	Dawna Bennett	Susan Anscheutz	Pam Finch	Lisa Schoeneberg (WWCC)	1990 USWCC (gold); 1990 WWCC (8th)
1992–93	Bev Behnke	Dawna Bennett	Susan Anscheutz	Pam Finch		1993 USWCC (gold)
1993–94	Bev Behnke	Dawna Bennett	Susan Anscheutz	Pam Finch		1994 USWCC (gold); 1994 WWCC (6th)

=== Mixed ===
Season	Skip	Third	Second	Lead	Events
1987–88	Tom Davis	Bev Behnke	Adolph Behnke	Pat Davis	1988 USMxCC (silver)
1989–90	Jack McNelly	Bev Behnke	Adolph Behnke	Dawna Bennett	1990 USMxCC (gold)
1996–97	Jack McNelly	Bev Behnke	Bucky Marshall	Susan Anschuetz	1997 USMxCC (gold)
