= Debbie McCormick =

Canadian-American curler (born 1974)

- Curler
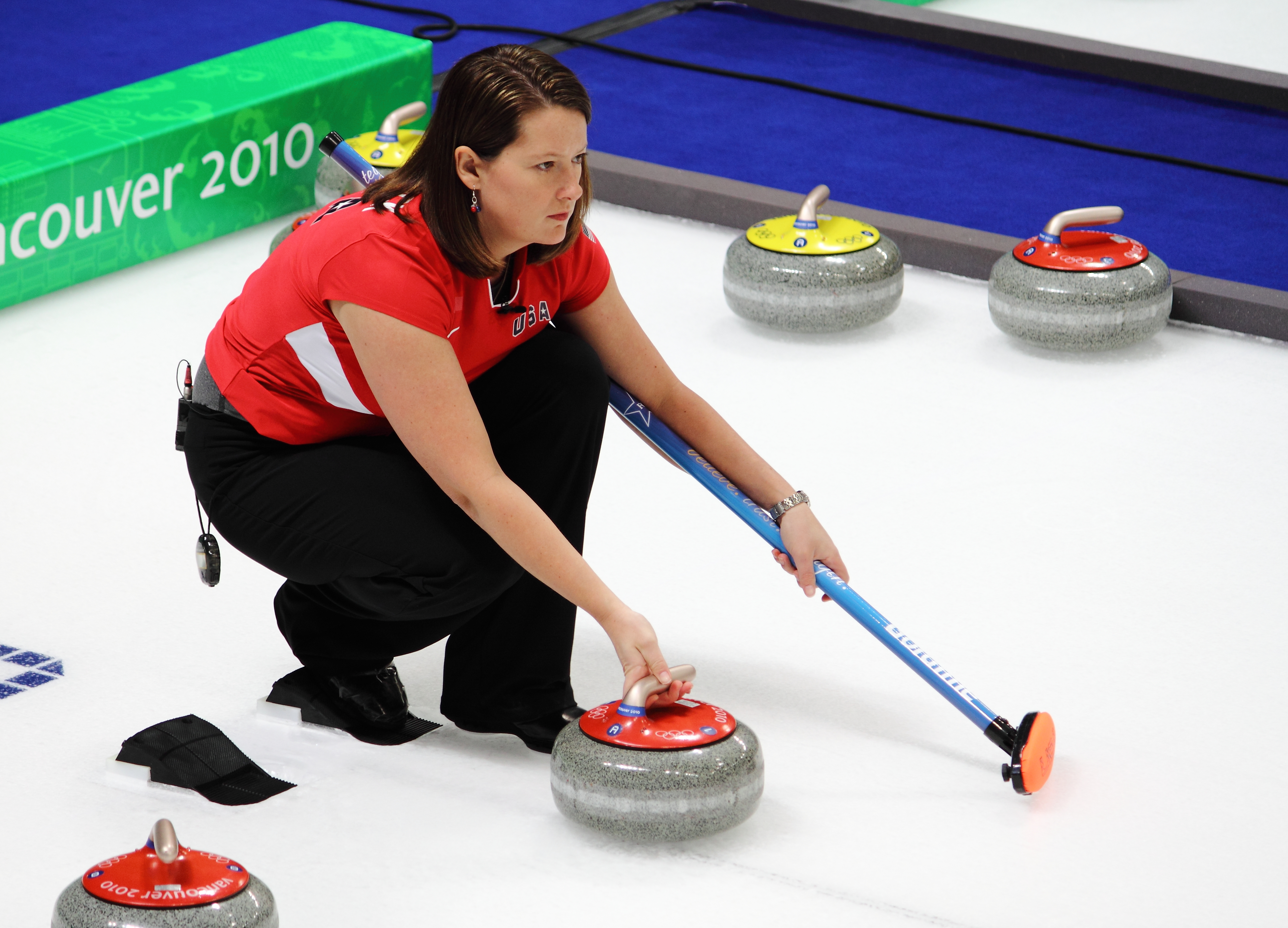
- Other names: Deborah McCormick
- Born: Deborah Henry; January 8, 1974 (age 52); Saskatoon, Saskatchewan, Canada

Curling career
- Member Association: Wisconsin
- World Championship: 9 (1996, 2001, 2003, 2006, 2007, 2008, 2009, 2011, 2013)
- Olympic: 4 (1998, 2002, 2010, 2014)
Medal record
Women's curling
Representing the United States
World Championships
Gold medal – first place	2003 Winnipeg
Silver medal – second place	1996 Hamilton
Silver medal – second place	2006 Grande Prairie
World Junior Championships
Silver medal – second place	1992 Oberstdorf
Silver medal – second place	1994 Sofia
Bronze medal – third place	1993 Grindelwald
United States Olympic Curling Trials
Gold medal – first place	1997 Duluth
Gold medal – first place	2001 Ogden
Gold medal – first place	2009 Broomfield
Gold medal – first place	2013 Fargo
Silver medal – second place	2005 Madison
United States National Championships
Gold medal – first place	2001 Madison
Gold medal – first place	2003 Utica
Gold medal – first place	2006 Bemidji
Gold medal – first place	2007 Utica
Gold medal – first place	2008 Hibbing
Gold medal – first place	2009 Broomfield
Gold medal – first place	2013 Green Bay
Silver medal – second place	2002 Eveleth
Silver medal – second place	2004 Grand Forks
Silver medal – second place	2005 Madison

Deborah McCormick (née Henry, born January 8, 1974) is an American curler from Rio, Wisconsin. Although born in Canada, McCormick moved to Madison, Wisconsin when she was very young. McCormick is a World Champion and four-time Olympian.

== Career ==
McCormick had an impressive junior career, winning two silvers and a bronze at various World Junior Curling Championships. Early in her adult curling career she played in two World Championships: as an alternate in 1996 for Lisa Schoeneberg's silver medal-winning team, and in 2001 she was a third for Kari Erickson's sixth place team.

McCormick skipped the United States to a World Championship in 2003. She defeated Canada, skipped by Colleen Jones, in the final. It was the first time the US had won a World Championships in women's curling and was McCormick's first international tournament as a skip. She returned to the Worlds in 2006 and won silver. McCormick defended her 2006 US title in 2007 by defeating Cassandra Johnson's rink 9–3. She went on to win the 2008 & 2009 National Championships/Olympic Trials.

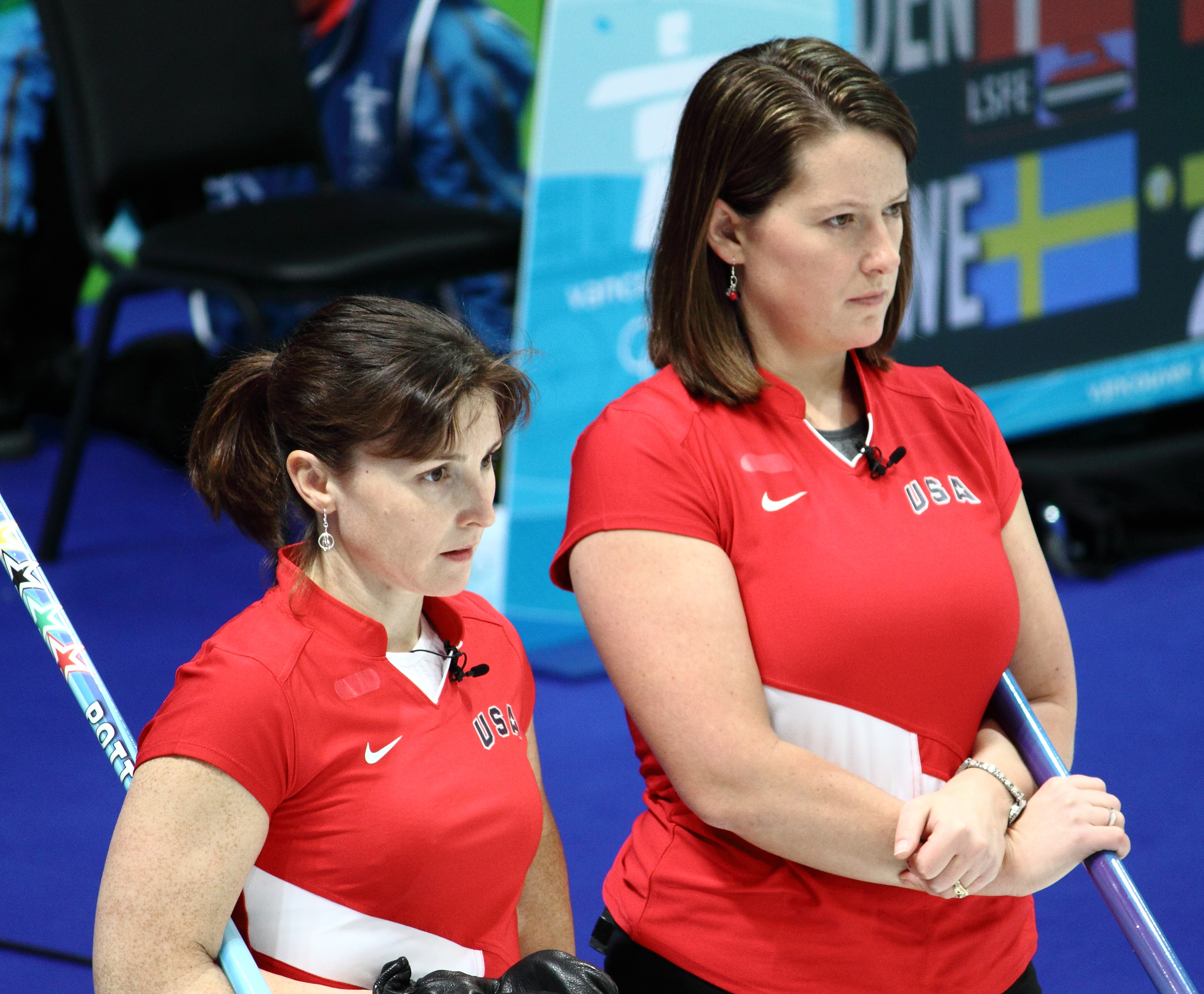
Allison Pottinger (left) with Debbie McCormick (right) at the 2010 Winter Olympics

McCormick has also participated in four Olympic games. At the 1998 Winter Olympics, she played second for Schoeneberg's fifth place team and at the 2002 Winter Olympics she played third for Erickson's fourth place team. She skipped the US Women's Olympic Team at the 2010 Winter Olympics, finishing 10th. She joined Erika Brown's rink in 2012, and after their win at the 2013 United States Women's Curling Championship, Brown and her team were qualified to participate at the 2014 United States Olympic Curling Trials. They finished first in the round robin standings and defeated former teammate Allison Pottinger in a best-of-three series final to clinch the berth to the Olympics, where her team placed 10th.

== Personal life ==
McCormick posed for Ana Arce's "Fire on Ice" 2007 Team Sponsorship Calendar to promote women's curling. She is the daughter of Wally Henry.

== Teams ==
Season	Skip	Third	Second	Lead	Alternate	Coach	Events
1988–89	Erika Brown	Tracy Zeman	Shellie Holerud	Jill Jones	Debbie Henry		1989 WJCC (6th)
1989–90	Erika Brown	Jill Jones	Shellie Holerud	Debbie Henry			1990 USJCC (bronze)
1990–91	Erika Brown	Jill Jones	Shellie Holerud	Debbie Henry			1991 USJCC (gold); 1991 WJCC (5th)
1991–92	Erika Brown	Kari Liapis	Stacey Liapis	Roberta Breyen	Debbie Henry		1992 USJCC (gold); 1992 WJCC (silver)
1992–93	Erika Brown	Kari Liapis	Stacey Liapis	Debbie Henry	Analissa Johnson		1993 USJCC (gold); 1993 WJCC (bronze)
1993–94	Erika Brown	Debbie Henry	Stacey Liapis	Analissa Johnson	Allison Darragh		1994 USJCC (gold); 1994 WJCC (silver)
1995–96	Lisa Schoeneberg	Erika Brown	Lori Mountford	Allison Darragh	Debbie Henry		1996 USWCC (gold); 1996 WWCC (silver)
1997–98	Lisa Schoeneberg	Erika Brown	Debbie Henry	Lori Mountford	Stacey Liapis	Steve Brown	1998 OG (5th)
1999–00	Debbie McCormick	Nicole Joraanstad	Stacey Liapis	Ann Swisshelm		Mike Liapis	2000 USWCC (SF)
2000–01	Kari Erickson	Debbie McCormick	Stacey Liapis	Ann Swisshelm	Joni Cotten	Mike Liapis	2001 USWCC (gold); 2001 WWCC (6th)
2001–02	Kari Erickson	Debbie McCormick	Stacey Liapis	Ann Swisshelm	Joni Cotten	Mike Liapis	2001 USOCT (gold); 2002 USWCC (silver); 2002 OG (4th)
2002–03	Debbie McCormick	Allison Pottinger	Ann Swisshelm Silver	Tracy Sachtjen	Joni Cotten	Wally Henry	2003 USWCC (gold); 2003 WWCC (gold)
2003–04	Debbie McCormick	Allison Pottinger	Ann Swisshelm Silver	Tracy Sachtjen	Joni Cotten		2004 USWCC (silver)
2004–05	Debbie McCormick	Allison Pottinger	Ann Swisshelm Silver	Tracy Sachtjen			2005 USWCC/USOCT (silver)
2005–06	Debbie McCormick	Allison Pottinger	Nicole Joraanstad	Tracy Sachtjen	Natalie Nicholson	Joni Cotten	2006 USWCC (gold)
2005–06	Debbie McCormick	Allison Pottinger	Nicole Joraanstad	Natalie Nicholson	Caitlin Maroldo	Wally Henry	2006 WWCC (silver)
2006–07	Debbie McCormick	Allison Pottinger	Nicole Joraanstad	Natalie Nicholson	Tracy Sachtjen		2007 USWCC (gold)
2006–07	Debbie McCormick	Allison Pottinger	Nicole Joraanstad	Natalie Nicholson	Maureen Brunt	Wally Henry	2007 WWCC (4th)
2007–08	Debbie McCormick	Allison Pottinger	Nicole Joraanstad	Natalie Nicholson	Tracy Sachtjen (WWCC)	Wally Henry	2008 USWCC (gold); 2008 WWCC (7th)
2008–09	'Debbie McCormick	Allison Pottinger	Nicole Joraanstad	Natalie Nicholson	Tracy Sachtjen	Wally Henry	2009 USWCC/USOCT (gold); 2009 WWCC (9th)
2009–10	Debbie McCormick	Allison Pottinger	Nicole Joraanstad	Natalie Nicholson	Tracy Sachtjen	Wally Henry	2010 OG (10th)
2010–11	Erika Brown	Nina Spatola	Ann Swisshelm	Laura Hallisey	Debbie McCormick		2011 USWCC (4th)
2010–11	Patti Lank	Caitlin Maroldo	Jessica Schultz	Mackenzie Lank	Debbie McCormick	Neil Harrison	2011 WWCC (7th)
2011–12	Erika Brown	Debbie McCormick	Jessica Schultz	Ann Swisshelm			2012 USWCC (5th)
2012–13	Erika Brown	Debbie McCormick	Jessica Schultz	Ann Swisshelm	Sarah Anderson (WWCC)	Bill Todhunter (WWCC)	2013 USWCC (gold); 2013 WWCC (4th)
2013–14	Erika Brown	Debbie McCormick	Jessica Schultz	Ann Swisshelm	Allison Pottinger (OG)	Bill Todhunter	2013 USOCT (gold); 2014 OG (10th)
2014–15	Debbie McCormick	Courtney George	Emilia Juocys	Stephanie Senneker			2015 USWCC (5th)
