= Erika Brown (curler) =

American curler (born 1973)

- Curler
- Other names: Erika Brown Oriedo
- Born: January 25, 1973 (age 53); Madison, Wisconsin, U.S.

Curling career
- World Championship: 8 (1995, 1996, 1999, 2002, 2004, 2010, 2013, 2016)
- Olympic: 3 (1988, 1998, 2014)
Medal record
Women's curling
Representing United States
World Curling Championships
Silver medal – second place	1996 Hamilton
Silver medal – second place	1999 Saint John
World Junior Curling Championships
Silver medal – second place	1992 Oberstdorf
Silver medal – second place	1994 Sofia
Bronze medal – third place	1993 Grindelwald
United States National Championships
Gold medal – first place	1995 Appleton
Gold medal – first place	1996 Bemidji
Gold medal – first place	1999 Duluth
Gold medal – first place	2002 Eveleth
Gold medal – first place	2004 Grand Forks
Gold medal – first place	2010 Kalamazoo
Gold medal – first place	2013 Green Bay
Gold medal – first place	2015 Kalamazoo
Gold medal – first place	2016 Jacksonville
Silver medal – second place	1991 Utica
Silver medal – second place	2001 Madison
Silver medal – second place	2003 Utica
Silver medal – second place	2000 Ogden
Bronze medal – third place	1993 St. Paul
Bronze medal – third place	1997 Seattle
Bronze medal – third place	1998 Bismarck
Bronze medal – third place	2006 Bemidji
Bronze medal – third place	2007 Utica
United States Olympic Curling Trials
Gold medal – first place	1987 St Paul
Gold medal – first place	1997 Duluth
Gold medal – first place	2013 Fargo
Silver medal – second place	2001 Ogden
Bronze medal – third place	2005 Madison

Erika Lynn Brown (born January 25, 1973) is an American curler, currently residing in Oakville, Ontario, Canada. She started curling in 1980 and throws right-handed.

== Career ==
As a 15-year-old, Brown represent the United States at the 1988 Winter Olympics when curling was a demonstration event. Brown played third on the team, skipped by Lisa Schoeneberg, and the team finished fifth. Brown then had a successful junior career, representing the United States at six (1988, 1989, 1991, 1992, 1993, 1994) World Junior Curling Championships, winning silver in 1992 and 1994 and a bronze in 1993.

Brown has participated in sixteen different United States National Championships, beginning with a second-place finish in 1991. In 1995 she won her first national championships and would go on to compete in the 1995 Brandon World Championships where her team placed fifth with a 4–5 record. Her second trip to the world championships proved more successful as her team won the silver medal behind Team Canada in 1996. She picked up a second World Championship silver medal in 1999 as the third for Patti Lank's team.

Brown competed at the 2010 US Olympic Trials, finishing fourth in the round robin portion of the tournament. In the 3 vs. 4 playoff she faced her former skip Patti Lank, but lost.

Upon their win at the 2013 United States Women's Curling Championship, Brown and her team were qualified to participate at the 2014 United States Olympic Curling Trials. They finished first in the round robin standings and defeated Allison Pottinger in a best-of-three series final to clinch the berth to the Olympics.

At the 2014 Winter Olympics, she led her American team to a 10th-place finish, with a 1–8 record.

Brown's team won the United States Women's Curling Championship in back-to-back years in 2015 and 2016. At the 2016 World Women's Curling Championship they finished in 6th place. In June 2016 Brown announced her retirement from competitive curling.

== Personal life ==
Brown attended La Follette High School in Madison, Wisconsin. Brown is married to three-time curling world champion Ian Tetley. Her brother Craig is also an Olympic curler. She works as a physician assistant in Hamilton, Ontario. She has three children.

== Teams ==
Season	Skip	Third	Second	Lead	Alternate	Coach	Events
1987–88	Tracy Zeman	Erika Brown	Marni Vaningan	Shellie Holerud			1988 USJCC (gold); 1988 WJCC (8th)
1987–88	Lisa Schoeneberg	Erika Brown	Carla Casper	Lori Mountford			1987 USOCT (gold); 1988 OG (5th)
1988–89	Erika Brown	Tracy Zeman	Shellie Holerud	Jill Jones	Debbie Henry (WJCC)		1989 USJCC (gold); 1989 WJCC (6th)
1989–90	Erika Brown	Jill Jones	Shellie Holerud	Debbie Henry			1990 USJCC (bronze)
1990–91	Lisa Schoeneberg	Erika Brown	Lori Mountford	Jill Jones	Vicki Bodeen		
1990–91	Erika Brown	Jill Jones	Shellie Holerud	Debbie Henry			1991 USJCC (gold); 1991 WJCC (5th)
1991–92	Erika Brown	Kari Liapis	Stacey Liapis	Roberta Breyen	Debbie Henry		1992 USJCC (gold); 1992 WJCC (silver)
1992–93	Erika Brown	Kari Liapis	Stacey Liapis	Debbie Henry	Analissa Johnson		1993 USJCC (gold); 1993 WJCC (bronze)
1993–94	Erika Brown	Debbie Henry	Stacey Liapis	Analissa Johnson	Allison Darragh		1994 USJCC (gold); 1994 WJCC (silver)
1994–95	Lisa Schoeneberg	Erika Brown	Lori Mountford	Marcia Tillisch	Allison Darragh		1995 USWCC (gold); 1995 WWCC (6th)
1995–96	Lisa Schoeneberg	Erika Brown	Lori Mountford	Allison Darragh	Debbie Henry		1996 USWCC (gold); 1996 WWCC (silver)
1997–98	Lisa Schoeneberg	Erika Brown	Debbie Henry	Lori Mountford	Stacey Liapis	Steve Brown	1998 OG (5th)
1998–99	Patti Lank	Erika Brown	Allison Darragh	Tracy Sachtjen	Barb Perrella (WWCC)	Steve Brown	1999 USWCC (gold); 1999 WWCC (silver)
1999–00	Patti Lank	Erika Brown	Allison Darragh	Tracy Sachtjen		Steve Brown	2000 USWCC (silver)
2000–01	Patti Lank	Erika Brown	Allison Darragh	Tracy Sachtjen		Keith Reilly	2001 USWCC (silver)
2001–02	Patti Lank	Erika Brown Oriedo	Allison Darragh	Tracy Sachtjen		Bev Behnke	2001 USOCT (silver)
2001–02	Patti Lank	Erika Brown	Allison Darragh	Natalie Nicholson	Nicole Joraanstad		2002 USWCC (gold); 2002 WWCC (8th)
2002–03	Patti Lank	Erika Brown	Nicole Joraanstad	Natalie Nicholson			2003 USWCC (silver)
2003–04	Patti Lank	Erika Brown	Nicole Joraanstad	Natalie Nicholson	Barb Perrella (WWCC)	Steve Brown	2004 USWCC (gold); 2004 WWCC (4th)
2004–05	Patti Lank	Erika Brown	Nicole Joraanstad	Natalie Nicholson		Matt Hames	2005 USWCC/USOCT (bronze)
2006–07	Patti Lank	Erika Brown	Caitlin Maroldo	Chrissy Haase	Ann Swisshelm		2007 USWCC (bronze)
2007–08	Patti Lank	Caitlin Maroldo	Chrissy Haase	Ann Swisshelm	Erika Brown	Steve Brown	2008 USWCC (silver)
2008–09	Erika Brown	Nina Spatola	Nina Reiniger	Laura Hallisey			2009 USWCC/USOCT (4th)
2009–10	Erika Brown	Nina Spatola	Ann Swisshelm	Laura Hallisey	Jessica Schultz (WWCC)	Bill Todhunter	2010 USWCC (gold); 2010 WWCC (5th)
2010–11	Erika Brown	Nina Spatola	Ann Swisshelm	Laura Hallisey	Debbie McCormick		2011 USWCC (4th)
2011–12	Erika Brown	Debbie McCormick	Jessica Schultz	Ann Swisshelm			2012 USWCC (5th)
2012–13	Erika Brown	Debbie McCormick	Jessica Schultz	Ann Swisshelm	Sarah Anderson (WWCC)	Bill Todhunter (WWCC)	2013 USWCC (gold); 2013 WWCC (4th)
2013–14	Erika Brown	Debbie McCormick	Jessica Schultz	Ann Swisshelm	Allison Pottinger (OG)	Bill Todhunter	2013 USOCT (gold); 2014 OG (10th)
2014–15	Erika Brown	Alex Carlson	Becca Funk	Kendall Behm			2015 USWCC (gold)
2015–16	Erika Brown	Allison Pottinger	Nicole Joraanstad	Natalie Nicholson	Tabitha Peterson (WWCC)	Ann Swisshelm (WWCC)	2016 USWCC (gold); 2016 WWCC (6th)

== Grand Slam record ==
Key
C	Champion
F	Lost in Final
SF	Lost in Semifinal
QF	Lost in Quarterfinals
R16	Lost in the round of 16
Q	Did not advance to playoffs
T2	Played in Tier 2 event
DNP	Did not participate in event
N/A	Not a Grand Slam event that season

Event	2007–08	2008–09	2009–10	2010–11	2011–12	2012–13	2013–14	2014–15	2015–16
Masters	N/A	N/A	N/A	N/A	N/A	Q	Q	DNP	DNP
Players' Championships	DNP	DNP	DNP	DNP	DNP	DNP	DNP	DNP	QF

=== Former events ===
Event	2007–08	2008–09	2009–10	2010–11	2011–12	2012–13	2013–14
Autumn Gold	DNP	DNP	DNP	Q	Q	DNP	Q
Manitoba Liquor & Lotteries	DNP	DNP	DNP	Q	Q	DNP	DNP
Colonial Square	N/A	N/A	N/A	N/A	N/A	Q	DNP
Sobeys Slam	Q	DNP	N/A	QF	N/A	N/A	N/A
