= 1996 World Junior Curling Championships =

- Host city: Red Deer, Alberta, Canada
- Dates: March 9–17, 1996
- Men's winner: Scotland
- Skip: James Dryburgh
- Third: Ross Barnet
- Second: Ronald Brewster
- Lead: David Murdoch
- Alternate: Euan Byers
- Finalist: Switzerland (Ralph Stöckli)
- Women's winner: Canada
- Skip: Heather Godberson
- Third: Carmen Whyte
- Second: Kristie Moore
- Lead: Terelyn Bloor
- Alternate: Rona McGregor
- Finalist: Scotland (Julia Ewart)

The 1996 Kärcher World Junior Curling Championships were held in Red Deer, Alberta March 9–17.

== Men's ==
Country	Skip	Wins	Losses
Switzerland	Ralph Stöckli	8	1
Scotland	James Dryburgh	8	1
Germany	Sebastian Stock	6	3
Canada	Jeff Currie	5	4
Norway	Torger Nergård	5	4
United States	Travis Way	5	4
Japan	Hiroshi Sato	4	5
Sweden	Martin Mattsson	2	7
Denmark	Johnny Frederiksen	2	7
Italy	Massimiliano Fummi	0	9

=== Tiebreakers ===
- Canada 8-3 United States
- Canada 8-7 Norway

=== Playoffs ===
Semi-final
1	Switzerland	9
4	Canada	1
2	Scotland	9
3	Germany	3

Final
1	Switzerland	4
2	Scotland	6
Bronze medal
3	Germany	11
4	Canada	3

== Women's ==
Country	Skip	Wins	Losses
Sweden	Margaretha Lindahl	8	1
Switzerland	Nadja Heuer	8	1
Canada	Heather Godberson	7	2
Scotland	Julia Ewart	5	4
Japan	Akiko Katoh	5	4
Norway	Camilla Claussen	4	5
Denmark	Kamilla Schack	3	6
Germany	Gerrit Müller	3	6
France	Nadia Bénier	3	6
United States	Amy Becher	0	9

== Tiebreaker ==
- Scotland 8-3 Japan

=== Playoffs ===
Semi-final
1	Sweden	4
4	Scotland	5
2	Switzerland	4
3	Canada	6

Final
4	Scotland	6
3	Canada	7
Bronze medal
1	Sweden	11
2	Switzerland	5

== Sources ==
- Men's results from the World Curling Federation
- Women's results from the World Curling Federation
