= Mike Schneeberger =

American curler

- Curler
- Born: August 5, 1962 (age 64); Superior, Wisconsin, U.S.

Curling career
- World Championship: 2 (1995, 1996)
- Olympic: 1 (2002)
Medal record
Men's curling
Representing United States
US Men's Championship
Gold medal – first place	1995 Appleton
Gold medal – first place	1996 Bemidji
US Olympic Trials
Gold medal – first place	2001 Ogden

Mike Schneeberger (born August 5, 1962, in Superior, Wisconsin) is an American curler. He competed in the 2002 Winter Olympics in Salt Lake City where the team finished 7th.

== Teams ==
2002 Winter Olympics, 1995 World Men's Championship, 1996 World Men's Championship

- Tim Somerville, Skip
- Mike Schneeberger, Third
- Myles Brundidge, Second
- John Gordon, Lead
