= Donald Barcome Jr. =

American curler

- Curler
- Born: April 19, 1958 (age 68); Green Bay, Wisconsin, U.S.

Curling career
- World Championship: 2 (1996, 1999)
- Olympic: 1 (2002)
Medal record
Men's curling
Representing United States
US Men's Championship
Gold medal – first place	1999 Duluth
World Junior Championships
Bronze medal – third place	1977 Quebec City
Gold medal – first place	1979 Moose Jaw

Donald Barcome Jr. (born April 19, 1958 in Green Bay, Wisconsin) is an American curler. He had a successful junior's career, representing the United States at the World Junior Curling Championships three times, winning the championship in 1979. In 1999 he was the vice-skip for Tim Somerville's team when they won the United States Men's Curling Championship, earning the right to represent the United States at the 1999 World Men's Curling Championship, where they finished 4th. In 2002 Barcome was the alternate for the American men's team at the Winter Olympics.

== Teams ==
2002 Winter Olympics

- Tim Somerville, Skip
- Mike Schneeberger, Third
- Myles Brundidge, Second
- John Gordon, Lead
- Donald Barcome Jr.,Alternate

1999 World Men's Championship

- Tim Somerville, Skip
- Donald Barcome Jr., Third
- Myles Brundidge, Second
- John Gordon, Lead
