= Amy Wright (curler) =

American curler (born 1964)

- Curler
- Born: Amy Hatten; January 28, 1964 (age 62); Duluth, Minnesota, U.S.

Curling career
- World Championship: 3 (1994, 1992, 2000)
Medal record
Women's curling
Representing United States
World Championships
Silver medal – second place	1992 Garmisch-Partenkirchen
United States Olympic Curling Trials
Silver medal – second place	1997 Duluth
Bronze medal – third place	2009 Broomfield
United States National Championships
Gold medal – first place	1984 Wauwatosa
Gold medal – first place	1992 Grafton
Gold medal – first place	2000 Ogden
Silver medal – second place	1994 Duluth
Silver medal – second place	1999 Duluth
Silver medal – second place	2013 Green Bay
Bronze medal – third place	2009 Broomfield
Bronze medal – third place	2010 Kalamazoo
US Mixed National Championships
Silver medal – second place	2001 Rice Lake

Amy Wright (née Hatten, born January 28, 1964) is an American curler from Duluth, Minnesota.

== Curling career ==
Wright made her United States Nationals debut in 1984 and competed on the winning team. Since 1984 she has competed in sixteen more US Nationals, with her last appearance in 2010. In addition to her team's victory in 1984, Wright has also been victorious in 1992 and 2000. She has been a runner-up once and won the Bronze medal at the 2009 Nationals, which doubled as the Olympic Trials for the 2010 Vancouver Olympics.

As the United States champion Wright has made three appearances at the Curling World Championships. Her team took ninth at her first worlds in 1984. Eight years later in 1992 she returned to the worlds, winning the silver medal and receiving the Frances Brodie Sportsmanship Award. At the 2000 Glasgow World Championships her team placed sixth with a 4–5 record.

After a seventh-place finish at the 2006 US Nationals Wright announced she would take a break from competitive curling. However, as the Vancouver Olympics neared, she joined Courtney George, Jordan Moulton, and Patti Luke to make an attempt to represent the United States. At the 2010 United States Olympic Curling Trials Wright's team finished in third.

== Personal life ==
Wright is married to fellow curler Tim Wright, they have two children. She earned a bachelor's degree in business and economics.

== Teammates ==
2010 United States Olympic Curling Trials

2010 United States Women's Curling Championship

Courtney George, Third

Jordan Moulton, Second

Patti Luke, Lead

Amanda McLean, Alternate

- Note: Amanda McLean served as the Alternate only for the 2010 Nationals
