= Mike Peplinski =

American curler

- Curler
- Born: February 11, 1974 (age 52); La Crosse, Wisconsin, U.S.

Team
- Curling club: Eau Claire Curling Club

Curling career
- Member Association: United States
- World Championship: 1 (1991)
- Olympic: 1 (1998)
Medal record
Men's curling
US Men's Championship
Silver medal – second place	2000 Ogden
US Olympic Trials
Gold medal – first place	1997 Duluth
World Junior Championships
Bronze medal – third place	1991 Glasgow
Bronze medal – third place	1994 Sofia
US Junior Championships
Gold medal – first place	1994 Madison
Gold medal – first place	1995 Hibbing
Silver medal – second place	1991 Bemidji

Mike Peplinski (born February 11, 1974) is an American curler and coach from Galesville, Wisconsin. He was the vice-skip for the Tim Somerville team at the 1998 Winter Olympics in Nagano, where curling debuted as an official Olympic medal sport. The team finished fourth after losing the bronze medal game to Norway. Peplinski was named Male Athlete of the Year by the United States Curling Association in 1994 and Developmental Coach of the Year by the United States Olympic and Paralympic Committee in 2022.

== Early life and education ==
Peplinski began curling in the fourth grade at the Centerville Curling Club in Centerville, Wisconsin. He played shortstop for the Viterbo College (now Viterbo University) baseball team. Peplinski was later inducted into the Viterbo Athletics Wall of Fame in recognition of his accomplishments in baseball and curling.

== Curling career ==
Peplinski was part of the first U.S. curling team to compete against Russia in 1993. He won the United States Junior Curling Championships in 1994 and 1995, and competed at three World Junior Curling Championships (1991, 1994, and 1995), earning bronze medals in 1991 and 1994. He was named All-Star Skip at the 1994 championship. Peplinski also competed as an alternate at the 1991 World Men's Curling Championship.

During the 1992–93 season, he competed in two international junior events in Switzerland. His team finished fifth out of 60 teams from 14 countries competing for the Wettinger Trophy in Baden, and went on to win the Bull Trophy in Grindelwald with a 4–2 record, including a victory over the Canadian Junior Men's Champions. In the 1994–95 season, he led his team to an undefeated 11–0 record at the United States Junior Curling Championships and became one of the youngest skips to reach the semifinals of the United States Men's Curling Championships.

He went on to compete in several U.S. Men's Nationals, finishing as runner-up in 2000 and semifinalist in 1996, 1997, 1999, and 2001. He was also a qualifier for the 2001 U.S. Olympic trials. Peplinski was a semifinalist for the Sullivan Award in both 1996 and 1997, an honor recognizing the top amateur athletes in the United States. In January 1998, prior to his appearance at the Winter Olympics, Peplinski was featured on Late Night with David Letterman alongside other members of the U.S. curling team. While in Japan for the Olympics, he met with Letterman's mother on three occasions as part of the show's recurring “Dave’s Mom” segments, which featured humorous interviews conducted by Letterman's real-life mother.

== Coaching ==
Peplinski coached Team Hebert (skip Caden Hebert) to several national and international titles:

- 2023 United States U18 Curling Championships – Champions
- 2023 United States Junior Curling Championships – Silver medalists
- 2023 WFG Canadian Junior Cup – Champions
- 2024 United States U18 Curling Championships – Champions
- 2024 United States Junior Curling Championships – Silver medalists
- 2025 United States Junior Curling Championships – Champions
- 2025 FISU World University Games – Silver medalists

== Health ==
In 1994, Peplinski was diagnosed with idiopathic membranous nephropathy, a rare kidney disease. He delayed a kidney transplant in order to compete in the 1998 Winter Olympics. The transplant was performed on June 11, 1998, with his father-in-law, Bill, serving as donor.
