= Jessica Schultz =

American curler (born 1985)

- Curler
- Born: January 2, 1985 (age 41); Anchorage, Alaska

Curling career
- World Championship: 4 (2005, 2010, 2011, 2013)
- Olympic: 2 (2006, 2014)
Medal record
World Curling Championships
Silver medal – second place	2005 Paisley
U.S. Olympic Trials
Gold medal – first place	2005 McFarland
Gold medal – first place	2013 Fargo
U.S. Women's Championship
Gold medal – first place	2005 Madison
Gold medal – first place	2011 Fargo
Gold medal – first place	2013 Green Bay
Silver medal – second place	2007 Utica
Silver medal – second place	2010 Kalamazoo
U.S. Mixed Doubles Championship
Gold medal – first place	2016 Denver

Jessica Schultz (born January 2, 1985) is a former American curler. She is a two-time Olympian and three-time U.S. Champion. She is currently the Director of the Women’s National Team & Juniors programs at the United States Curling Association.

== Curling career ==
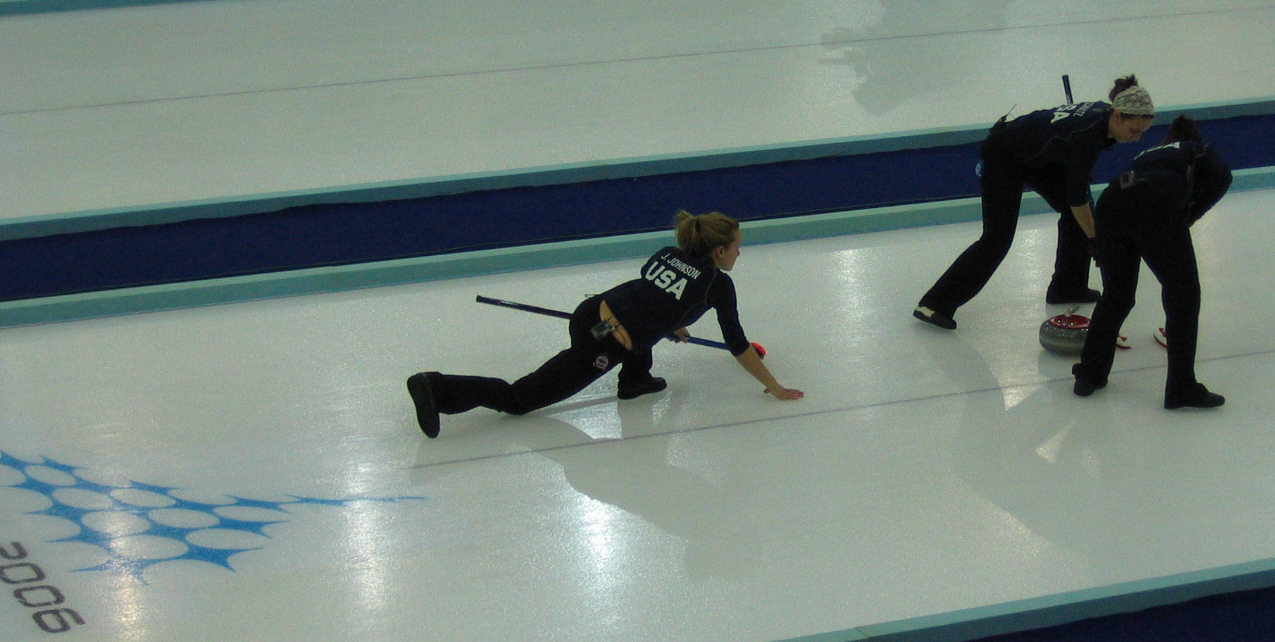
Schultz at Turin 2006

Schultz was a member of the United States women's curling team at the 2006 Winter Olympics. For the 2006 U.S. World Team Trials in March, Schultz was named skip, or captain, of Team USA (the team's regular skip, Cassie Johnson, did not play in the tournament), and the team finished fourth under her direction.

She joined the Erika Brown rink in 2011. Brown and her team won the 2013 United States Women's Curling Championship and went on to represent the United States at the 2013 World Women's Curling Championship, finishing in fourth after losing the bronze medal game to Canada's Rachel Homan. They also qualified to participate at the 2014 United States Olympic Curling Trials. They finished first in the round robin standings and defeated Allison Pottinger in a best-of-three series final to clinch the berth to the Olympics.

After retiring from competitive curling, Schultz moved back to Alaska and has been involved in growing the sport of curling in that state, starting a nonprofit called curlAK towards that purpose. In May 2020 the United States Curling Association announced Schultz would be the new Director of the Women’s National Team & Juniors programs.

== Personal life ==
She lived in Duluth, Minnesota. While attending Lake Superior College, she studied physical therapy.

== Teams ==
=== Women's ===
Season	Skip	Third	Second	Lead	Alternate	Coach	Events
1998–99	Liz Ziegler	Jessica Schultz	Julie Johnson	Kelly Snider	Miranda Barker	Tom Kent, Gail Snider	1999 USJCC (10th)
1999–00	Julie Johnson	Jessica Schultz	Kelly Snider	Liz Ziegler	Miranda Barker	Kathryn Palth	2000 USJCC (7th)
2000–01	Jessica Schultz	Liz Ziegler	Kelly Snider	Miranda Barker		Kathy Pahl, Marty Schultz	2001 USJCC (SF)
2001–02	Jessica Schultz	Liz Ziegler	Kelly Snider	Miranda Barker		Marty Schultz	2002 USJCC (6th)
2002–03	Jessica Schultz	Liz Ziegler	Kelly Snider	Jennifer Taylor	Elizabeth Williams	Dennis Thies	2003 USJCC (5th)
2003–04	Jessica Schultz	Liz Ziegler	Kelly Snider	Kaye Hufman	Lacy Birklid	Dennis Thies	2004 USJCC (SF)
2003–04	Aileen Sormunen	Courtney George	Amanda Jensen	Amanda McLean	Jessica Schultz	Cynthia Johnson	2004 WJCC (4th)
2004–05	Cassandra Johnson	Jamie Johnson	Jessica Schultz	Maureen Brunt	Courtney George (WWCC)	Neil Doese (WWCC)	2005 USWCC/USOCT (gold); 2005 WWCC (silver)
2005–06	Cassandra Johnson	Jamie Johnson	Jessica Schultz	Maureen Brunt	Courtney George	Neil Doese	2006 OG (8th)
2005–06	Jessica Schultz	Jamie Johnson	Courtney George	Maureen Brunt		Neil Doese	2006 USWCC (4th)
2006–07	Jessica Schultz	Christina Schwartz	Megan O'Connell	Stephanie Sambor	Lysa Hambley	Jim Dexter	2007 WUG (7th)
2006–07	Cassandra Johnson	Jamie Haskell	Jessica Schultz	Maureen Brunt			2007 USWCC (silver)
2007–08	Cassandra Potter	Jamie Haskell	Jessica Schultz	Maureen Brunt	Jackie Lemke	Jim Dexter	2008 USWCC (4th)
2008–09	Aileen Sormunen	Molly Bonner	Jessica Schultz	Maureen Brunt	Sophie Brorson		2009 USWCC/USOCT (5th)
2009–10	Patti Lank	Aileen Sormunen	Caitlin Maroldo	Jessica Schultz			2010 USWCC (silver)
2009–10	Erika Brown	Nina Spatola	Ann Swisshelm	Laura Hallisey	Jessica Schultz	Bill Todhunter	2010 WWCC (5th)
2010–11	Patti Lank	Caitlin Maroldo	Jessica Schultz	Mackenzie Lank	Christina Schwartz (USWCC); Debbie McCormick (WWCC)	Neil Harrison (WWCC)	2011 USWCC (gold); 2011 WWCC (7th)
2011–12	Erika Brown	Debbie McCormick	Jessica Schultz	Ann Swisshelm			2012 USWCC (5th)
2012–13	Erika Brown	Debbie McCormick	Jessica Schultz	Ann Swisshelm	Sarah Anderson (WWCC)	Bill Todhunter (WWCC)	2013 USWCC (gold); 2013 WWCC (4th)
2013–14	Erika Brown	Debbie McCormick	Jessica Schultz	Ann Swisshelm	Allison Pottinger (OG)	Bill Todhunter	2013 USOCT (gold); 2014 OG (10th)
2016–17	Jessica Schultz	Courtney George	Jordan Moulton	Stephanie Senneker			2017 USWCC (6th)
2017–18	Jessica Schultz	Courtney George	Jordan Moulton	Stephanie Senneker			

=== Mixed doubles ===
Season	Female	Male	Events
2015–16	Jessica Schultz	Jason Smith	2016 USMDCC (gold)
