= Allison Pottinger =

American curler

- Curler
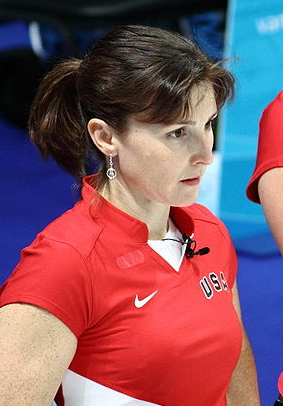
- Pottinger at the 2010 Winter Olympics
- Born: Allison Darragh; July 5, 1973 (age 53); Brampton, Ontario, Canada

Team
- Curling club: St. Paul CC, St. Paul, Minnesota

Curling career
- Member Association: Minnesota
- World Championship: 13 (1995, 1996, 1997, 1999, 2002, 2003, 2006, 2007, 2008, 2009, 2012, 2014, 2016)
- Olympic: 2 (2010, 2014)
Medal record
Women's curling
Representing the United States
World Championships
Gold medal – first place	2003 Winnipeg
Silver medal – second place	1996 Hamilton
Silver medal – second place	1999 Saint John
Silver medal – second place	2006 Grand Prairie
World Junior Championships
Silver medal – second place	1994 Sofia
United States Olympic Curling Trials
Gold medal – first place	2009 Broomfield	Team
Silver medal – second place	2001 Ogden	Team
Silver medal – second place	2005 Madison	Team
Silver medal – second place	2013 Fargo	Team
United States National Championships
Gold medal – first place	1995 Appleton
Gold medal – first place	1996 Bemidji
Gold medal – first place	1999 Duluth
Gold medal – first place	2002 Eveleth
Gold medal – first place	2003 Utica
Gold medal – first place	2006 Bemidji
Gold medal – first place	2007 Utica
Gold medal – first place	2008 Hibbing
Gold medal – first place	2009 Broomfield
Gold medal – first place	2012 Philadelphia
Gold medal – first place	2016 Jacksonville
Silver medal – second place	2000 Ogden
Silver medal – second place	2001 Madison
Silver medal – second place	2004 Grand Forks
Silver medal – second place	2005 Madison
Silver medal – second place	2011 Fargo
Silver medal – second place	2014 Philadelphia
Bronze medal – third place	2013 Green Bay
United States Mixed Doubles Curling Championship
Silver medal – second place	2016 Denver

Allison Pottinger /ˈpɒtəndʒər/ (née Darragh, born July 5, 1973) is a Canadian-American curler from Eden Prairie, Minnesota. She is best known as having played for Debbie McCormick in multiple Olympics and World Championships. McCormick left the team in 2010. She competed in the 2010 Winter Olympic Games, in Vancouver, Canada. She was named USA female curling athlete of the year in 2008.

== Career ==
Pottinger curls out of the St. Paul Curling Club in St. Paul, Minnesota. She learned how to curl in Otterburn Park, Quebec.

In 1994, Pottinger was an alternate for Erika Brown's silver medal-winning team at the 1994 World Junior Curling Championships. Pottinger picked up another silver medal at the 1996 World Curling Championships as the lead for Lisa Schoeneberg. In 1999, Pottinger won another silver medal, this time playing second for Patti Lank. In 2003, she had moved up to the position of third, and played for Debbie McCormick. In 2003, they won the first gold medal for an American team at the World Curling Championships. They would go to the Worlds again in 2006, where they won a silver medal.

Upon their semifinal win at the 2012 United States Women's Curling Championship, Pottinger and her team were qualified to participate at the 2014 United States Olympic Curling Trials. Her team lost in the trials, but Pottinger was selected as the Alternate for the victorious team (which includes former teammate McCormick). Pottinger attended the 2014 Olympics but was not selected to play in any matches for Team USA.

== Personal life ==
Pottinger is a consumer insights manager with Rakuten Intelligence. She graduated from the University of Wisconsin–Oshkosh and has bachelor's degrees in Political Science and History. She earned an MBA in Marketing at the University of Wisconsin–Milwaukee. She is married to Doug Pottinger and has two children.

== Awards ==
- USA Curling Female Athlete of the Year: 2008, 2012
- USA Curling Team of the Year: 1999, 2003

== Teams ==
=== Women's ===
Season	Skip	Third	Second	Lead	Alternate	Coach	Events
1993–94	Erika Brown	Debbie Henry	Stacey Liapis	Analissa Johnson	Allison Darragh		1994 USJCC (gold); 1994 WJCC (silver)
1994–95	Lisa Schoeneberg	Erika Brown	Lori Mountford	Marcia Tillisch	Allison Darragh		1995 USWCC (gold); 1995 WWCC (6th)
1995–96	Lisa Schoeneberg	Erika Brown	Lori Mountford	Allison Darragh	Debbie Henry		1996 USWCC (gold); 1996 WWCC (silver)
1996–97	Patti Lank	Analissa Johnson	Joni Cotten	Tracy Sachtjen	Allison Darragh		1997 WWCC (7th)
1998–99	Patti Lank	Erika Brown	Allison Darragh	Tracy Sachtjen	Barb Perrella (WWCC)	Steve Brown (WWCC)	1999 USWCC (gold); 1999 WWCC (silver)
1999–00	Patti Lank	Erika Brown	Allison Darragh	Tracy Sachtjen		Steve Brown	2000 USWCC (silver)
2000–01	Patti Lank	Erika Brown	Allison Darragh	Tracy Sachtjen		Keith Reilly	2001 USWCC (silver)
2001–02	Patti Lank	Erika Brown Oriedo	Allison Darragh	Tracy Sachtjen		Bev Behnke	2001 USOCT (silver)
2001–02	Patti Lank	Erika Brown	Allison Darragh	Natalie Nicholson	Nicole Joraanstad		2002 USWCC (gold); 2002 WWCC (8th)
2002–03	Debbie McCormick	Allison Pottinger	Ann Swisshelm Silver	Tracy Sachtjen	Joni Cotten	Wally Henry	2003 USWCC (gold); 2003 WWCC (gold)
2003–04	Debbie McCormick	Allison Pottinger	Ann Swisshelm Silver	Tracy Sachtjen	Joni Cotten		2004 USWCC (silver)
2004–05	Debbie McCormick	Allison Pottinger	Ann Swisshelm Silver	Tracy Sachtjen			2005 USWCC/USOCT (silver)
2005–06	Debbie McCormick	Allison Pottinger	Nicole Joraanstad	Tracy Sachtjen	Natalie Nicholson	Joni Cotten	2006 USWCC (gold)
2005–06	Debbie McCormick	Allison Pottinger	Nicole Joraanstad	Natalie Nicholson	Caitlin Maroldo	Wally Henry	2006 WWCC (silver)
2006–07	Debbie McCormick	Allison Pottinger	Nicole Joraanstad	Natalie Nicholson	Tracy Sachtjen		2007 USWCC (gold)
2006–07	Debbie McCormick	Allison Pottinger	Nicole Joraanstad	Natalie Nicholson	Maureen Brunt	Wally Henry	2007 WWCC (4th)
2007–08	Debbie McCormick	Allison Pottinger	Nicole Joraanstad	Natalie Nicholson	Tracy Sachtjen (WWCC)	Wally Henry	2008 USWCC (gold); 2008 WWCC (7th)
2008–09	Debbie McCormick	Allison Pottinger	Nicole Joraanstad	Natalie Nicholson	Tracy Sachtjen	Wally Henry	2009 USWCC/USOCT (gold); 2009 WWCC (9th)
2009–10	Debbie McCormick	Allison Pottinger	Nicole Joraanstad	Natalie Nicholson	Tracy Sachtjen	Wally Henry	2010 OG (10th)
2010–11	Allison Pottinger	Nicole Joraanstad	Natalie Nicholson	Tabitha Peterson			2011 USWCC (silver)
2011–12	Allison Pottinger	Nicole Joraanstad	Natalie Nicholson	Tabitha Peterson	Cassandra Potter	Derek Brown	2012 USWCC (gold); 2012 WWCC (5th)
2012–13	Allison Pottinger	Nicole Joraanstad	Natalie Nicholson	Tabitha Peterson			2013 USWCC (bronze)
2013–14	Allison Pottinger	Nicole Joraanstad	Natalie Nicholson	Tabitha Peterson	Tara Peterson (WWCC)	Derek Brown (WWCC)	2013 USOCT (silver); 2014 USWCC (silver); 2014 WWCC (6th)
2013–14	Erika Brown	Debbie McCormick	Jessica Schultz	Ann Swisshelm	Allison Pottinger	Bill Todhunter	2014 OG (10th)
2015–16	Erika Brown	Allison Pottinger	Nicole Joraanstad	Natalie Nicholson	Tabitha Peterson (WWCC)	Ann Swisshelm (WWCC)	2016 USWCC (gold); 2016 WWCC (6th)
2018–19	Allison Pottinger	Courtney George	Jordan Moulton	Regan Birr			

=== Mixed doubles ===
Season	Male	Female	Events
2015–16	Allison Pottinger	Doug Pottinger	2016 USMDCC (silver)

=== Mixed ===
Season	Skip	Third	Second	Lead	Events
1995	Mike Fraboni	Allison Pottinger	Mark Swandby	Toni Swandby	1995 USMxCC (gold)
1998	Mike Fraboni	Allison Pottinger	Craig Brown	Tracy Sachtjen	1998 USMxCC (gold)

== Grand Slam record ==
Key
C	Champion
F	Lost in Final
SF	Lost in Semifinal
QF	Lost in Quarterfinals
R16	Lost in the round of 16
Q	Did not advance to playoffs
T2	Played in Tier 2 event
DNP	Did not participate in event
N/A	Not a Grand Slam event that season

Event	2007–08	2008–09	2009–10	2010–11
Autumn Gold	DNP	DNP	DNP	Q
Manitoba Lotteries	QF	Q	DNP	Q
Sobeys Slam	DNP	DNP	N/A	DNP
Players' Championships	DNP	DNP	DNP	DNP
