= 2008 United States Women's Curling Championship =

- Host city: Hibbing, Minnesota
- Arena: Hibbing Curling Club
- Dates: February 16–23, 2008
- Winner: (Wisconsin) Team McCormick
- Curling club: Madison CC, McFarland, WI
- Skip: Debbie McCormick
- Third: Allison Pottinger
- Second: Nicole Joraanstad
- Lead: Natalie Nicholson
- Finalist: (New York (state)) Patti Lank

The 2008 United States Women's Curling Championship was held from February 16 to 23 at the Hibbing Curling Club in Hibbing, Minnesota. It was held in conjunction with the 2008 United States Men's Curling Championship. Team McCormick, led by Debbie McCormick, won the tournament for the third year in a row, a record for the US Nationals. With the win Team McCormick earned the opportunity to represent the United States at the 2009 World Women's Championship held in Gangneung, South Korea, where they finished 9th.

== Teams ==
Seven teams competed in the 2008 Championship. It would have been eight teams but Alex Carlson's team chose to withdraw to focus on the 2008 US Junior Championships, which were held just before the Women's Championship, February 2 to 9.

Skip	Third	Second	Lead	Alternate Coach	Locale
Gillian Gervais	Stephanie Roland	Stephanie Jensen	Sarah Felchle	Dave Jensen	Bismarck, North Dakota
Patti Lank	Caitlin Maroldo	Ann Swisshelm Silver	Chrissy Haase	Erika Brown; Steve Brown	(New York (state)) Lewiston, New York
Charrissa Lin	Janice Langanke	Nicole Arseneault	Rachel Sethi	Sandra McMakin	New Haven, Connecticut
Debbie McCormick	Allison Pottinger	Nicole Joraanstad	Natalie Nicholson	Wally Henry	Rio, Wisconsin
Cassie Potter	Jamie Haskell	Jessica Schultz	Maureen Brunt	Jackie Lemke; Jim Dexter	Minneapolis, Minnesota
Aileen Sormunen	Courtney George	Molly Bonner	Jordan Moulton	Bob Fenson	Duluth, Minnesota
Anne Stuhlman	Diane Higgins	Lisa Mitchell	Karen Rogowski		(New York (state)) New Hartford, New York

== Round robin standings ==
Final round robin standings.

Key
Teams to playoffs

Skip	W	L
(Wisconsin) Debbie McCormick	5	1
(Minnesota) Aileen Sormunen	5	1
(Minnesota) Cassie Potter	5	1
(New York (state)) Patti Lank	3	3
(North Dakota) Gillian Gervais	2	4
(Connecticut) Charrisa Lin	1	5
(New York (state)) Anne Stuhlman	0	6

== Round robin results ==
All draw times are listed in Central Standard Time (UTC−6).

=== Draw 1 ===
Monday, February 18, 8:00am

Team	1	2	3	4	5	6	7	8	9	10	Final
Debbie McCormick	2	1	0	2	1	0	2	0	3	X	11
Charrisa Lin	0	0	1	0	0	2	0	1	0	X	4

Team	1	2	3	4	5	6	7	8	9	10	Final
Patti Lank	2	0	0	3	1	0	2	0	1	X	9
Gillian Gervais	0	1	1	0	0	1	0	2	0	X	5

Team	1	2	3	4	5	6	7	8	9	10	Final
Cassie Potter	0	1	0	0	1	1	0	1	0	X	4
Aileen Sormunen	2	0	0	3	0	0	2	0	1	X	8

=== Draw 2 ===
Monday, February 18, 4:00pm

Team	1	2	3	4	5	6	7	8	9	10	Final
Aileen Sormunen	0	0	2	1	0	0	3	0	3	X	10
Anne Stuhlman	0	1	0	0	1	1	0	0	0	X	3

Team	1	2	3	4	5	6	7	8	9	10	Final
Charrisa Lin	0	1	0	1	0	1	0	0	X	X	3
Patti Lank	1	0	5	0	2	0	0	3	X	X	11

Team	1	2	3	4	5	6	7	8	9	10	Final
Gillian Gervais	0	1	1	1	0	X	X	X	X	X	3
Debbie McCormick	6	0	0	0	5	X	X	X	X	X	11

=== Draw 3 ===
Tuesday, February 19, 9:00am

Team	1	2	3	4	5	6	7	8	9	10	Final
Cassie Potter	0	0	0	4	0	2	0	0	0	3	9
Gillian Gervais	0	0	1	0	1	0	1	1	1	0	5

Team	1	2	3	4	5	6	7	8	9	10	Final
Aileen Sormunen	0	3	0	5	0	3	0	X	X	X	11
Charrisa Lin	1	0	1	0	2	0	2	X	X	X	6

Team	1	2	3	4	5	6	7	8	9	10	Final
Anne Stuhlman	0	1	1	0	2	1	0	0	0	X	5
Debbie McCormick	2	0	0	3	0	0	1	1	3	X	10

=== Draw 4 ===
Tuesday, February 19, 7:00pm

Team	1	2	3	4	5	6	7	8	9	10	Final
Patti Lank	0	0	1	0	2	0	1	1	0	1	6
Cassie Potter	1	2	0	1	0	2	0	0	1	0	7

Team	1	2	3	4	5	6	7	8	9	10	Final
Debbie McCormick	2	0	1	1	1	1	1	0	1	X	8
Aileen Sormunen	0	2	0	0	0	0	0	1	0	X	3

Team	1	2	3	4	5	6	7	8	9	10	Final
Charrisa Lin	0	2	0	2	0	4	0	0	4	X	12
Anne Stuhlman	1	0	1	0	1	0	1	1	0	X	5

=== Draw 5 ===
Wednesday, February 20, 12:00pm

Team	1	2	3	4	5	6	7	8	9	10	Final
Patti Lank	1	0	1	2	0	5	0	X	X	X	9
Anne Stuhlman	0	0	0	0	3	0	1	X	X	X	4

Team	1	2	3	4	5	6	7	8	9	10	Final
Cassie Potter	1	0	1	2	0	2	1	0	1	X	8
Debbie McCormick	0	1	0	0	2	0	0	1	0	X	4

Team	1	2	3	4	5	6	7	8	9	10	Final
Gillian Gervais	1	0	2	1	1	0	2	0	1	0	8
Charrisa Lin	0	2	0	0	0	1	0	2	0	1	6

=== Draw 6 ===
Wednesday, February 20, 8:00pm

Team	1	2	3	4	5	6	7	8	9	10	11	Final
Anne Stuhlman	2	0	0	0	0	1	0	0	1	2	0	6
Gillian Gervais	0	1	1	0	1	0	1	2	0	0	1	7

Team	1	2	3	4	5	6	7	8	9	10	Final
Charrisa Lin	0	0	1	0	0	0	X	X	X	X	1
Cassie Potter	0	3	0	1	2	1	X	X	X	X	7

Team	1	2	3	4	5	6	7	8	9	10	Final
Aileen Sormunen	1	0	1	1	0	4	0	1	0	2	10
Patti Lank	0	2	0	0	3	0	2	0	2	0	9

=== Draw 7 ===
Thursday, February 21, 12:00pm

Team	1	2	3	4	5	6	7	8	9	10	Final
Anne Stuhlman	0	0	1	0	0	X	X	X	X	X	1
Cassie Potter	4	1	0	3	1	X	X	X	X	X	9

Team	1	2	3	4	5	6	7	8	9	10	Final
Debbie McCormick	1	1	1	1	1	0	1	0	3	X	9
Patti Lank	0	0	0	0	0	4	0	1	0	X	5

Team	1	2	3	4	5	6	7	8	9	10	Final
Gillian Gervais	0	0	0	2	0	1	1	0	0	1	5
Aileen Sormunen	0	0	3	0	1	0	0	3	0	0	7

== Playoffs ==
Page playoff system
1	(Minnesota) Aileen Sormunen	3
2	(Wisconsin) Debbie McCormick	8
3	(Minnesota) Cassie Potter	7
4	(New York (state)) Patti Lank	8

Semifinal
1	(Minnesota) Aileen Sormunen	6
4	(New York (state)) Patti Lank	7

Final
2	(Wisconsin) Debbie McCormick	8
4	(New York (state)) Patti Lank	6

=== 1 vs. 2 ===
Friday, February 22, 12:00pm

Team	1	2	3	4	5	6	7	8	9	10	Final
(Minnesota) Aileen Sormunen	1	0	0	0	0	0	2	0	0	X	3
(Wisconsin) Debbie McCormick	0	0	1	1	1	1	0	2	2	X	8

=== 3 vs. 4 ===
Friday, February 22, 12:00pm

Team	1	2	3	4	5	6	7	8	9	10	11	Final
(Minnesota) Cassie Potter	0	1	0	1	0	2	2	0	0	1	0	7
(New York (state)) Patti Lank	0	0	1	0	2	0	0	4	0	0	1	8

=== Semifinal ===
Friday, February 22, 7:00pm

Team	1	2	3	4	5	6	7	8	9	10	11	Final
(Minnesota) Aileen Sormunen	1	0	1	0	0	3	0	1	0	0	0	6
(New York (state)) Patti Lank	0	1	0	1	0	0	2	0	1	1	1	7

=== Final ===
Saturday, February 23, 11:00 am

Team	1	2	3	4	5	6	7	8	9	10	Final
(Wisconsin) Debbie McCormick	1	2	0	2	1	0	2	0	1	X	8
(New York (state)) Patti Lank	0	0	2	0	0	2	0	2	0	X	6
