= 2013 United States Women's Curling Championship =

- Host city: Green Bay, Wisconsin
- Arena: Cornerstone Community Center
- Dates: February 9–16
- Winner: (Wisconsin) Erika Brown
- Curling club: Madison CC, Madison
- Skip: Erika Brown
- Third: Debbie McCormick
- Second: Jessica Schultz
- Lead: Ann Swisshelm
- Finalist: (Minnesota) Courtney George

The 2013 United States Women's Curling Championship was held from February 9 to 16 at the Cornerstone Community Center in Green Bay, Wisconsin. It was held in conjunction with the 2013 United States Men's Curling Championship. The winning team represented the United States at the 2013 World Women's Curling Championship in Riga, Latvia. The championship also acted as a qualifier to the 2014 United States Olympic Curling Trials, awarding a qualifying spot to the winners of the championship.

== Road to the Nationals ==
A total of ten teams will be able to participate in the women's national championship by qualifying through the High Performance Program, through the World Curling Tour Order of Merit, or through a challenge round.

== Teams ==
There will be ten teams participating in this year's national championship. The teams are to be announced.

Skip	Third	Second	Lead	Alternate	Locale	Qualification method
Laura Roessler^{1}	Jamie Haskell	Jackie Lemke	Steph Sambor	Cassandra Potter	St. Paul, Minnesota	High Performance Program team
Allison Pottinger	Nicole Joraanstad	Natalie Nicholson	Tabitha Peterson		St. Paul, Minnesota	High Performance Program team
Erika Brown	Debbie McCormick	Jessica Schultz	Ann Swisshelm		Madison, Wisconsin	Order of Merit
Patti Lank	Mackenzie Lank	Nina Spatola	Caitlin Maroldo		(New York (state)) Lewiston, New York	Order of Merit
Alexandra Carlson	Monica Walker	Kendall Moulton-Behm	Jordan Moulton		Minneapolis, Minnesota	Challenge Round
Courtney George	Aileen Sormunen	Amanda McLean	Julie Lilla	Amy Wright	Duluth, Minnesota	Challenge Round
Becca Hamilton	Molly Bonner	Tara Peterson	Sophie Brorson		Madison, Wisconsin	Challenge Round
Shelly Kinney	Amy Lou Anderson	Theresa Hoffoss	Julie Smith		Minnesota	Challenge Round
Cristin Clark	Patti Killins	Christina Pastula	Christie Wilhelmy		(Washington (state)) Seattle, Washington	Challenge Round
Sarah Anderson	Courtney Slata	Kathleen Dubberstein	Taylor Anderson		Philadelphia, Pennsylvania	Challenge Round

Notes

1. Roessler is filling in for Potter, who is out on maternity leave.

== Round robin standings ==
Final round robin standings

Key
Teams to playoffs
Teams to Tiebreaker

Skip	W	L	PF	PA	Ends won	Ends Lost	Blank ends	Stolen ends	Shot pct.
(Wisconsin) Erika Brown	7	2	70	39	41	26	12	18	80%
(Minnesota) Courtney George	7	2	65	44	39	30	12	9	76%
(Minnesota) Allison Pottinger	7	2	77	40	36	30	7	10	83%
(Minnesota) Alexandra Carlson	5	4	60	53	35	40	10	4	74%
(New York (state)) Patti Lank	5	4	53	55	38	35	13	10	78%
(Minnesota) Laura Roessler	4	5	48	58	32	35	17	6	72%
(Washington (state)) Cristin Clark	3	6	40	69	29	37	12	4	64%
(Wisconsin) Becca Hamilton	3	6	48	72	30	39	11	4	70%
(Pennsylvania) Sarah Anderson	2	7	52	67	38	42	6	11	70%
(Minnesota) Shelly Kinney	2	7	47	64	33	36	8	7	68%

== Round robin results ==
All draw times are listed in Central Standard Time (UTC−6).

=== Draw 1 ===
Saturday, February 9, 4:30 pm

Sheet 1	1	2	3	4	5	6	7	8	9	10	Final
(Minnesota) Alexandra Carlson	0	0	2	1	1	0	1	0	1	X	6
(Minnesota) Shelly Kinney	0	1	0	0	0	1	0	2	0	X	4

Sheet 2	1	2	3	4	5	6	7	8	9	10	Final
(Minnesota) Allison Pottinger	0	0	1	0	0	0	2	0	0	0	3
(New York (state)) Patti Lank	1	1	0	1	0	0	0	0	0	2	5

Sheet 3	1	2	3	4	5	6	7	8	9	10	Final
(Pennsylvania) Sarah Anderson	0	1	0	0	0	2	0	X	X	X	3
(Minnesota) Courtney George	1	0	3	1	1	0	4	X	X	X	10

Sheet 4	1	2	3	4	5	6	7	8	9	10	Final
(Minnesota) Laura Roessler	0	0	2	1	2	0	0	0	3	X	8
(Washington (state)) Cristin Clark	0	1	0	0	0	1	0	0	0	X	2

Sheet 5	1	2	3	4	5	6	7	8	9	10	Final
(Wisconsin) Erika Brown	0	0	0	0	1	1	3	1	0	1	7
(Wisconsin) Becca Hamilton	0	2	1	2	0	0	0	0	3	0	8

=== Draw 2 ===
Sunday, February 10, 8:00 am

Sheet 1	1	2	3	4	5	6	7	8	9	10	Final
(Wisconsin) Becca Hamilton	1	0	1	0	0	1	0	1	0	X	4
(Minnesota) Courtney George	0	2	0	0	3	0	1	0	2	X	8

Sheet 2	1	2	3	4	5	6	7	8	9	10	Final
(Wisconsin) Erika Brown	2	0	0	1	0	1	4	X	X	X	8
(Minnesota) Shelly Kinney	0	0	2	0	0	0	0	X	X	X	2

Sheet 3	1	2	3	4	5	6	7	8	9	10	Final
(Washington (state)) Cristin Clark	0	0	1	0	1	0	1	0	1	1	5
(New York (state)) Patti Lank	1	1	0	2	0	1	0	1	0	0	6

Sheet 4	1	2	3	4	5	6	7	8	9	10	Final
(Pennsylvania) Sarah Anderson	0	1	0	2	0	1	0	1	0	X	5
(Minnesota) Allison Pottinger	1	0	1	0	1	0	3	0	3	X	9

Sheet 5	1	2	3	4	5	6	7	8	9	10	11	Final
(Minnesota) Laura Roessler	1	0	2	0	1	1	0	1	0	1	0	7
(Minnesota) Alexandra Carlson	0	1	0	2	0	0	1	0	3	0	2	9

=== Draw 3 ===
Sunday, February 10, 4:00 pm

Sheet 1	1	2	3	4	5	6	7	8	9	10	Final
(Pennsylvania) Sarah Anderson	0	0	0	3	0	0	2	0	3	0	8
(New York (state)) Patti Lank	2	2	1	0	2	1	0	1	0	1	10

Sheet 2	1	2	3	4	5	6	7	8	9	10	Final
(Minnesota) Courtney George	0	1	0	0	0	3	0	1	0	0	5
(Minnesota) Laura Roessler	1	0	0	0	2	0	1	0	3	1	8

Sheet 3	1	2	3	4	5	6	7	8	9	10	Final
(Minnesota) Allison Pottinger	3	0	0	4	0	1	1	X	X	X	9
(Wisconsin) Becca Hamilton	0	0	2	0	2	0	0	X	X	X	4

Sheet 4	1	2	3	4	5	6	7	8	9	10	Final
(Wisconsin) Erika Brown	1	0	2	1	0	0	0	0	1	0	5
(Minnesota) Alexandra Carlson	0	2	0	0	0	0	0	1	0	1	4

Sheet 5	1	2	3	4	5	6	7	8	9	10	Final
(Washington (state)) Cristin Clark	0	0	0	2	0	2	0	0	X	X	4
(Minnesota) Shelly Kinney	2	1	2	0	1	0	0	6	X	X	12

=== Draw 4 ===
Monday, February 11, 8:00 am

Sheet 1	1	2	3	4	5	6	7	8	9	10	Final
(Minnesota) Shelly Kinney	0	1	0	1	0	1	X	X	X	X	3
(Minnesota) Allison Pottinger	3	0	4	0	2	0	X	X	X	X	9

Sheet 2	1	2	3	4	5	6	7	8	9	10	Final
(Minnesota) Alexandra Carlson	0	0	1	0	0	0	1	0	2	0	4
(Washington (state)) Cristin Clark	1	0	0	0	0	2	0	1	0	1	5

Sheet 3	1	2	3	4	5	6	7	8	9	10	Final
(Wisconsin) Erika Brown	2	1	0	2	0	2	0	3	X	X	10
(Minnesota) Laura Roessler	0	0	1	0	0	0	2	0	X	X	3

Sheet 4	1	2	3	4	5	6	7	8	9	10	Final
(Minnesota) Courtney George	1	0	0	0	1	1	0	1	2	X	6
(New York (state)) Patti Lank	0	1	0	0	0	0	2	0	0	X	3

Sheet 5	1	2	3	4	5	6	7	8	9	10	Final
(Wisconsin) Becca Hamilton	0	1	0	0	4	0	1	0	1	0	7
(Pennsylvania) Sarah Anderson	0	0	1	1	0	1	0	2	0	1	6

=== Draw 5 ===
Monday, February 11, 4:00 pm

Sheet 1	1	2	3	4	5	6	7	8	9	10	11	Final
(Washington (state)) Cristin Clark	0	0	0	2	0	1	1	0	1	0	1	6
(Pennsylvania) Sarah Anderson	1	1	0	0	1	0	0	1	0	1	0	5

Sheet 2	1	2	3	4	5	6	7	8	9	10	Final
(Minnesota) Laura Roessler	0	1	0	1	0	0	X	X	X	X	2
(Minnesota) Allison Pottinger	3	0	1	0	3	4	X	X	X	X	11

Sheet 3	1	2	3	4	5	6	7	8	9	10	Final
(Minnesota) Courtney George	1	0	0	3	0	1	1	0	1	X	7
(Minnesota) Alexandra Carlson	0	0	2	0	2	0	0	1	0	X	5

Sheet 4	1	2	3	4	5	6	7	8	9	10	Final
(Minnesota) Shelly Kinney	1	0	1	0	1	1	1	2	0	2	9
(Wisconsin) Becca Hamilton	0	2	0	3	0	0	0	0	2	0	7

Sheet 5	1	2	3	4	5	6	7	8	9	10	Final
(New York (state)) Patti Lank	1	0	0	0	2	0	0	X	X	X	3
(Wisconsin) Erika Brown	0	2	0	2	0	2	2	X	X	X	8

=== Draw 6 ===
Tuesday, February 12, 9:00 am

Sheet 1	1	2	3	4	5	6	7	8	9	10	Final
(Minnesota) Courtney George	1	0	2	0	0	0	2	1	0	0	6
(Wisconsin) Erika Brown	0	2	0	0	0	1	0	0	1	1	5

Sheet 2	1	2	3	4	5	6	7	8	9	10	Final
(Wisconsin) Becca Hamilton	0	1	0	0	2	0	X	X	X	X	3
(Minnesota) Alexandra Carlson	5	0	0	1	0	3	X	X	X	X	9

Sheet 3	1	2	3	4	5	6	7	8	9	10	Final
(Minnesota) Shelly Kinney	1	0	0	1	0	0	0	0	1	X	3
(Pennsylvania) Sarah Anderson	0	2	1	0	1	1	2	0	0	X	7

Sheet 4	1	2	3	4	5	6	7	8	9	10	Final
(New York (state)) Patti Lank	1	0	0	2	0	0	0	0	0	1	4
(Minnesota) Laura Roessler	0	0	2	0	0	1	0	0	0	0	3

Sheet 5	1	2	3	4	5	6	7	8	9	10	Final
(Minnesota) Allison Pottinger	0	3	3	2	0	3	X	X	X	X	11
(Washington (state)) Cristin Clark	1	0	0	0	1	0	X	X	X	X	2

=== Draw 7 ===
Tuesday, February 12, 7:00 pm

Sheet 1	1	2	3	4	5	6	7	8	9	10	Final
(New York (state)) Patti Lank	2	0	0	2	0	1	0	1	1	0	7
(Minnesota) Alexandra Carlson	0	2	3	0	1	0	2	0	0	1	9

Sheet 2	1	2	3	4	5	6	7	8	9	10	Final
(Minnesota) Shelly Kinney	1	0	1	0	0	1	0	0	X	X	3
(Minnesota) Courtney George	0	4	0	2	1	0	0	1	X	X	8

Sheet 3	1	2	3	4	5	6	7	8	9	10	Final
(Wisconsin) Becca Hamilton	1	0	0	0	0	0	0	2	0	X	3
(Washington (state)) Cristin Clark	0	0	0	0	2	4	2	0	3	X	11

Sheet 4	1	2	3	4	5	6	7	8	9	10	Final
(Minnesota) Allison Pottinger	0	2	0	0	1	2	0	0	2	0	7
(Wisconsin) Erika Brown	2	0	1	0	0	0	2	2	0	1	8

Sheet 5	1	2	3	4	5	6	7	8	9	10	Final
(Pennsylvania) Sarah Anderson	0	1	0	0	2	0	0	2	1	1	7
(Minnesota) Laura Roessler	2	0	2	0	0	0	1	0	0	0	5

=== Draw 8 ===
Wednesday, February 13, 12:00 pm

Sheet 1	1	2	3	4	5	6	7	8	9	10	Final
(Minnesota) Laura Roessler	2	0	1	0	1	0	0	1	0	0	5
(Wisconsin) Becca Hamilton	0	1	0	1	0	0	0	0	1	1	4

Sheet 2	1	2	3	4	5	6	7	8	9	10	Final
(Pennsylvania) Sarah Anderson	1	1	0	0	1	0	1	0	1	0	5
(Wisconsin) Erika Brown	0	0	2	1	0	2	0	1	0	2	8

Sheet 3	1	2	3	4	5	6	7	8	9	10	Final
(Minnesota) Alexandra Carlson	0	0	0	2	0	1	0	2	0	0	5
(Minnesota) Allison Pottinger	1	1	1	0	1	0	1	0	3	1	9

Sheet 4	1	2	3	4	5	6	7	8	9	10	Final
(Washington (state)) Cristin Clark	1	0	1	0	0	1	0	1	0	X	4
(Minnesota) Courtney George	0	2	0	1	0	0	2	0	4	X	9

Sheet 5	1	2	3	4	5	6	7	8	9	10	Final
(Minnesota) Shelly Kinney	0	1	2	0	0	1	0	1	0	0	5
(New York (state)) Patti Lank	1	0	0	1	1	0	1	0	2	2	8

=== Draw 9 ===
Wednesday, February 13, 8:00 pm

Sheet 1	1	2	3	4	5	6	7	8	9	10	Final
(Wisconsin) Erika Brown	2	0	2	3	1	3	X	X	X	X	11
(Washington (state)) Cristin Clark	0	1	0	0	0	0	X	X	X	X	1

Sheet 2	1	2	3	4	5	6	7	8	9	10	Final
(New York (state)) Patti Lank	0	2	1	0	3	0	0	0	1	0	7
(Wisconsin) Becca Hamilton	2	0	0	2	0	0	1	1	0	2	8

Sheet 3	1	2	3	4	5	6	7	8	9	10	Final
(Minnesota) Laura Roessler	0	1	0	0	1	0	2	0	0	3	7
(Minnesota) Shelly Kinney	0	0	1	2	0	1	0	0	2	0	6

Sheet 4	1	2	3	4	5	6	7	8	9	10	Final
(Minnesota) Alexandra Carlson	1	0	3	0	2	0	0	0	2	1	9
(Pennsylvania) Sarah Anderson	0	1	0	2	0	2	1	0	0	0	6

Sheet 5	1	2	3	4	5	6	7	8	9	10	Final
(Minnesota) Courtney George	1	0	2	0	0	0	1	1	1	X	6
(Minnesota) Allison Pottinger	0	2	0	0	3	4	0	0	0	X	9

== Tiebreaker ==
Thursday, February 14, 12:00 pm

Team	1	2	3	4	5	6	7	8	9	10	Final
(Minnesota) Alexandra Carlson	4	0	1	0	0	1	1	0	2	X	9
(New York (state)) Patti Lank	0	2	0	1	1	0	0	2	0	X	6

Player percentages
(Minnesota) Alexandra Carlson		(New York (state)) Patti Lank	
Jordan Moulton	84%	Caitlin Maroldo	84%
Kendall Moulton-Behm	78%	Nina Spatola	78%
Monica Walker	66%	Mackenzie Lank	57%
Alexandra Carlson	67%	Patti Lank	59%
Total	74%	Total	70%

== Playoffs ==
Semifinals
1	(Minnesota) Courtney George	9
4	(Minnesota) Alexandra Carlson	6
2	(Wisconsin) Erika Brown	8
3	(Minnesota) Allison Pottinger	7

Final
1	(Minnesota) Courtney George	6
2	(Wisconsin) Erika Brown	7
Bronze Medal Game
4	(Minnesota) Alexandra Carlson	2
3	(Minnesota) Allison Pottinger	11

=== Semifinals ===
Thursday, February 14, 8:00 pm

Team	1	2	3	4	5	6	7	8	9	10	Final
(Minnesota) Courtney George	2	0	1	0	4	0	0	2	0	X	9
(Minnesota) Alexandra Carlson	0	0	0	2	0	1	2	0	1	X	6

Player percentages
(Minnesota) Courtney George		(Minnesota) Alexandra Carlson	
Julie Lilla	74%	Jordan Moulton	80%
Amanda McLean	86%	Kendall Moulton-Behm	80%
Aileen Sormunen	86%	Monica Walker	91%
Courtney George	74%	Alexandra Carlson	65%
Total	80%	Total	79%

Team	1	2	3	4	5	6	7	8	9	10	11	Final
(Wisconsin) Erika Brown	1	0	1	0	2	0	0	3	0	0	1	8
(Minnesota) Allison Pottinger	0	2	0	1	0	1	0	0	2	1	0	7

Player percentages
(Wisconsin) Erika Brown		(Minnesota) Allison Pottinger	
Ann Swisshelm	78%	Tabitha Peterson	84%
Jessica Schultz	80%	Natalie Nicholson	90%
Debbie McCormick	77%	Nicole Joraanstad	85%
Erika Brown	84%	Allison Pottinger	87%
Total	80%	Total	87%

=== Bronze medal game ===
Friday, February 15, 2:00 pm

Team	1	2	3	4	5	6	7	8	9	10	Final
(Minnesota) Alexandra Carlson	0	0	0	0	0	0	1	0	1	X	2
(Minnesota) Allison Pottinger	0	3	0	3	2	2	0	1	0	X	11

Player percentages
(Minnesota) Alexandra Carlson		(Minnesota) Allison Pottinger	
Jordan Moulton	90%	Tabitha Peterson	83%
Kendall Moulton-Behm	76%	Natalie Nicholson	78%
Monica Walker	73%	Nicole Joraanstad	87%
Alexandra Carlson	52%	Allison Pottinger	91%
Total	73%	Total	85%

=== Final ===
Saturday, February 16, 9:00 am

Team	1	2	3	4	5	6	7	8	9	10	11	Final
(Minnesota) Courtney George	1	0	0	1	0	1	1	0	1	1	0	6
(Wisconsin) Erika Brown	0	3	0	0	1	0	0	2	0	0	1	7

Player percentages
(Minnesota) Courtney George		(Wisconsin) Erika Brown	
Julie Lilla	86%	Ann Swisshelm	64%
Amanda McLean	74%	Jessica Schultz	89%
Aileen Sormunen	75%	Debbie McCormick	87%
Courtney George	64%	Erika Brown	77%
Total	75%	Total	79%
