= Katie Beck =

American curler (1982–2006)

- Curler
- Born: September 4, 1982; Manning, Iowa
- Died: December 30, 2006 (aged 24)

Curling career
- Member Association: United States
Medal record
Curling
Representing United States
World Junior Curling Championships
Gold medal – first place	2002 Kelowna
Silver medal – second place	2003 Flims
Bronze medal – third place	2000 Geising

Katherine Marie Beck (September 4, 1982 – December 30, 2006) was an American curler from Omaha, Nebraska. She was a three-time World Junior Curling Championships medalist, including a gold medal in 2002.

== Curling career ==
Beck began curling in 1992 at the age of ten. She competed in her first national championship at the 2000 Junior Nationals, playing third for skip Pam Montbach. They earned the silver medal, losing to Laura Delaney's team in the final. Beck later joined Delaney's team as alternate when they represented the United States at the 2000 World Junior Championships in Geising, Germany, earning a bronze medal. The next year Beck returned to Junior Nationals with the same team, swapping positions with Montbach, but settled for sixth place in the end.

For the 2001–02 season Beck played second with the Johnson sisters, Cassie and Jamie, and Maureen Brunt. They found great success, winning both the United States Junior Championship and World Junior Championship, the first American junior women's team to win the World Championship. The team was named United States Curling Association's Team of the Year for 2002. The next year Jamie aged out of juniors so became the teams coach for Junior Nationals, with Beck moving to third and Rebecca Dobie joining the team at second. The Johnson team defended their title, when the US Junior Nationals for a second year in a row. At the 2003 World Juniors they again made it to the final, but settled for the silver medal when they lost to Canada's Marliese Miller. They also competed at the 2003 United States Women's Championship, Beck's first, making it to the semifinals before getting knocked out by Patti Lank, the defending champion.

Aged out of juniors, the team maintained the same line-up for the 2003–04 season. They again made it to the semifinals of Women's Nationals and again got knocked out by the defending champions, this time Debbie McCormick. In the 2004–05 season Beck played as alternate for Caitlin Maroldo's team at the National Championship, which was also the Olympic Trials for the 2006 Winter Olympics. They finished in seventh place.

== Personal life ==
Beck grew up in Omaha, Nebraska and started curling because of her parents. She attended the University of Minnesota, graduating with a Bachelor of Individualized Studies degree.

In 2005 Beck was diagnosed with Ewing's sarcoma and she died on December 30, 2006.

After her death, the Katie Beck Memorial Award was created in honor of Beck and is given annually to junior curlers that show "coachability, good sportsmanship, a positive attitude, and a commitment to competitive junior curling".

In 2023, Beck's youth home club, Aksarben Curling, established the Katie Beck Cup in her honor. The Katie Beck Cup is awarded to the winner of Aksarben Curling's annual end-of-season championship tournament.

== Teams ==
Season	Skip	Third	Second	Lead	Alternate	Coach	Events
1999–00	Pam Montbach	Katie Beck	Larissa Anderson	Carin Goodall		Sharon O'Brien	2000 USJCC (silver)
1999–00	Laura Delaney	Nicole Joraanstad	Kirsten Finch	Rebecca Dobie	Katie Beck	Lisa Schoeneberg	2000 WJCC (bronze)
2000–01	Katie Beck	Pam Montbach	Larissa Anderson	Carin Goodall		Sharon O'Brien	2001 USJCC (6th)
2001–02	Cassie Johnson	Jamie Johnson	Katie Beck	Maureen Brunt	Courtney George (WJCC)	Jim Dexter	2002 USJCC (gold); 2002 WJCC (gold)
2002–03	Cassie Johnson	Katie Beck	Rebecca Dobie	Maureen Brunt		Jamie Johnson	2003 USJCC (gold); 2003 USWCC (SF)
2002–03	Cassie Johnson	Katie Beck	Rebecca Dobie	Maureen Brunt	Courtney George	Neil Doese	2003 WJCC (silver)
2003–04	Cassie Johnson	Katie Beck	Rebecca Dobie	Maureen Brunt		Neil Doese	2004 USWCC (SF)
2004–05	Caitlin Maroldo	Chrissy Fink-Haase	Elizabeth Williams	Erlene Puleo	Katie Beck		2005 USOCT/USWCC (7th)
