= Maureen Clark =

American curler (born 1982)

- Curler
- Born: Maureen Brunt; December 20, 1982 (age 43); Portage, Wisconsin, USA

Curling career
- World Championship: 2 (2005, 2007)
- Olympic: 1 (2006)
Medal record
World Women's Championship
Silver medal – second place	2005 Paisley
US Women's Championship
Gold medal – first place	2005 Madison
Silver medal – second place	2007 Utica
US Olympic Trials
Gold medal – first place	2005 Madison
World Junior Championship
Gold medal – first place	2002 Kelowna
Silver medal – second place	2003 Flims

Maureen Clark (born December 20, 1982, as Maureen Brunt) is an American curler. She began curling at the age of 5 at the Portage Curling Club, a few blocks from her home.

== Career ==
Clark began curling competitively at the age of 14. She was the skip of her high school curling team all four years. She also led her team to a state championship in 2000 and 2001. Clark's first National Junior Championship appearance was in 1999 where she placed sixth. In the fall of 2001 she was the newest addition to the Cassie Johnson's team, where she played lead. The Johnson Team were the Junior National Champions in 2002 and 2003. Clark, along with teammates Cassie Johnson, Jamie Johnson, and Katie Beck, were the first junior women from the United States to win a gold medal at the World Junior Championships, in 2002. In 2003 Johnson, Beck, and Clark returned to the World Juniors where they claimed the silver medal, losing to Canada in the final.

In 2005 Clark and teammates Cassie Johnson, Jamie Johnson, and new addition Jessica Schultz were the Women's National Champions, awarding them the right to represent the United States in the 2006 Turin Winter Olympics and 2005 World Championships. At the World Championships, held in Paisley, Scotland, the team won the silver medal. The team's only losses of the week were against Annette Norberg Swedish team, the second time in the final. While expecting a strong finish at the Turin Olympics with the silver medal win the previous year at World's, the Johnson team had a disappointing performance, finishing with a record of 2–7.

Clark returned to the National Women's Championships four more times after the Olympics, earning a silver medal in 2007 when they lost to Debbie McCormmick in the final. Clark then joined Debbie McCormick's as alternate for the 2007 World Championships in Aomori, Japan.

== Personal life ==
Her brother is Ryan Brunt, who competed in the 2011 Ford World Men's Curling Championship as Pete Fenson's lead.

She married Jason Clark in 2010.

== Teams ==
Season	Skip	Third	Second	Lead	Alternate	Coach	Events
1998–99	Maureen Brunt	Morgan Dunn	Amanda Moe	Amanda Weyh	Angela Moe	Dan Brunt	1999 USJCC (8th)
2001–02	Cassandra Johnson	Jamie Johnson	Katie Beck	Maureen Brunt	Courtney George (WJCC)	Jim Dexter	2002 USJCC (gold); 2002 WJCC (gold)
2002–03	Cassandra Johnson	Katie Beck	Rebecca Dobie	Maureen Brunt	Courtney George (WJCC)	Jamie Johnson (USJCC); Neil Doese (WJCC)	2003 USJCC (gold); 2003 WJCC (silver)
2002–03	Cassandra Johnson	Jamie Johnson	Katie Beck	Maureen Brunt			2003 USWCC (SF)
2003–04	Cassandra Johnson	Jamie Johnson	Katie Beck	Maureen Brunt		Neil Doese	2004 USWCC (SF)
2004–05	Cassandra Johnson	Jamie Johnson	Jessica Schultz	Maureen Brunt	Courtney George (WWCC)	Neil Doese (WWCC)	2005 USWCC/USOCT (gold); 2005 WWCC (silver)
2005–06	Cassandra Johnson	Jamie Johnson	Jessica Schultz	Maureen Brunt	Courtney George	Neil Doese	2006 OG (8th)
2005–06	Jessica Schultz	Jamie Johnson	Courtney George	Maureen Brunt		Neil Doese	2006 USWCC (4th)
2006–07	Cassandra Johnson	Jamie Haskell	Jessica Schultz	Maureen Brunt			2007 USWCC (silver)
2007–08	Cassandra Potter	Jamie Haskell	Jessica Schultz	Maureen Brunt	Jackie Lemke	Jim Dexter	2008 USWCC (4th)
2008–09	Aileen Sormunen	Molly Bonner	Jessica Schultz	Maureen Brunt	Sophie Brorson		2009 USWCC/USOCT (5th)
