= 2017 United States Women's Curling Championship =

- Host city: Everett, Washington
- Arena: Xfinity Arena
- Dates: February 11–18
- Winner: (Minnesota) Team Sinclair
- Curling club: Four Seasons Curling Club, Blaine, Minnesota
- Skip: Jamie Sinclair
- Third: Alexandra Carlson
- Second: Vicky Persinger
- Lead: Monica Walker
- Finalist: (Minnesota) Nina Roth

The 2017 United States Women's Curling Championship was held from February 11 to 18 at the Xfinity Arena in Everett, Washington. It was held in conjunction with the 2017 United States Men's Curling Championship.

== Teams ==
Eight teams qualified to participate in the 2017 national championship.

Skip	Third	Second	Lead	Locale
Cory Christensen	Sarah Anderson	Taylor Anderson	Jenna Haag	Blaine, Minnesota
Cristin Clark	Emily Anderson	Kathleen Dubberstein	Sherri Schummer	(Washington (state)) Seattle, Washington
Cora Farrell	Cait Flannery	Lexi Lanigan	Rebecca Miles	Blaine, Minnesota
Cassie Potter	Jackie Lemke	Sophie Bader	Stephanie Bohan	St Paul, Minnesota
Nina Roth	Tabitha Peterson	Aileen Geving	Becca Hamilton	Blaine, Minnesota
Jessica Schultz	Courtney George	Jordan Moulton	Stephanie Senneker	St Paul, Minnesota
Jamie Sinclair	Alexandra Carlson	Vicky Persinger	Monica Walker	Blaine, Minnesota
Becca Wood	Porsche Renae Stephenson	Auria Moore	Donna Umali Mendoza	Denver, Colorado

== Round-robin standings ==
Final round-robin standings

Key
Teams to playoffs

Skip	W	L
(Minnesota) Jamie Sinclair	6	1
(Minnesota) Cassie Potter	5	2
(Minnesota) Nina Roth	5	2
(Minnesota) Cora Farrell	4	3
(Minnesota) Cory Christensen	4	3
(Minnesota) Jessica Schultz	3	4
(Washington (state)) Cristin Clark	1	6
(Colorado) Becca Wood	0	7

== Round-robin results ==
All draw times are listed in Central Standard Time.

=== Draw 1 ===
Sunday, February 12, 4:00pm

Team	1	2	3	4	5	6	7	8	9	10	Final
Becca Wood	0	0	0	0	1	0	0	X	X	X	1
Jamie Sinclair	1	1	3	1	0	3	3	X	X	X	12

Team	1	2	3	4	5	6	7	8	9	10	Final
Cassie Potter	0	2	0	2	0	1	1	2	0	1	9
Jessica Schultz	1	0	2	0	2	0	0	0	2	0	7

Team	1	2	3	4	5	6	7	8	9	10	Final
Cristin Clark	1	0	2	0	2	0	1	0	0	0	6
Cora Farrell	0	2	0	1	0	3	0	1	0	1	8

Team	1	2	3	4	5	6	7	8	9	10	Final
Nina Roth	0	0	0	0	0	1	0	0	2	0	3
Cory Christensen	0	0	1	0	0	0	0	2	0	1	4

=== Draw 2 ===
Monday, February 13, 9:00am

Team	1	2	3	4	5	6	7	8	9	10	Final
Cristin Clark	1	0	1	2	0	0	1	0	1	0	6
Cory Christensen	0	1	0	0	3	1	0	1	0	1	7

Team	1	2	3	4	5	6	7	8	9	10	Final
Nina Roth	0	0	2	1	0	1	0	1	0	X	5
Cora Farrell	0	0	0	0	1	0	1	0	0	X	2

Team	1	2	3	4	5	6	7	8	9	10	Final
Jamie Sinclair	2	0	3	1	0	2	3	X	X	X	11
Jessica Schultz	0	1	0	0	1	0	0	X	X	X	2

Team	1	2	3	4	5	6	7	8	9	10	Final
Cassie Potter	3	1	4	1	1	0	X	X	X	X	10
Becca Wood	0	0	0	0	0	0	X	X	X	X	0

=== Draw 3 ===
Monday, February 13, 7:00pm

Team	1	2	3	4	5	6	7	8	9	10	Final
Nina Roth	1	1	2	0	0	2	0	0	3	X	9
Jessica Schultz	0	0	0	2	1	0	1	1	0	X	5

Team	1	2	3	4	5	6	7	8	9	10	Final
Becca Wood	0	0	1	3	0	1	0	0	0	X	5
Cristin Clark	4	1	0	0	2	0	0	6	1	X	14

Team	1	2	3	4	5	6	7	8	9	10	Final
Cassie Potter	0	0	0	1	0	4	0	0	2	1	8
Cory Christensen	0	1	0	0	3	0	1	0	0	0	5

Team	1	2	3	4	5	6	7	8	9	10	Final
Cora Farrell	0	0	1	0	0	0	2	0	1	X	4
Jamie Sinclair	0	0	0	2	2	1	0	2	0	X	7

=== Draw 4 ===
Tuesday, February 14, 12:00pm

Team	1	2	3	4	5	6	7	8	9	10	Final
Cory Christensen	1	1	1	0	1	0	0	1	1	X	6
Jamie Sinclair	0	0	0	1	0	1	2	0	0	X	4

Team	1	2	3	4	5	6	7	8	9	10	Final
Cora Farrell	0	0	0	1	0	2	1	3	X	X	7
Jessica Schultz	0	0	0	0	2	0	0	0	X	X	2

Team	1	2	3	4	5	6	7	8	9	10	11	Final
Cristin Clark	0	0	2	0	0	1	1	1	0	1	0	6
Cassie Potter	0	1	0	1	1	0	0	0	3	0	2	8

Team	1	2	3	4	5	6	7	8	9	10	Final
Becca Wood	0	0	0	0	0	X	X	X	X	X	0
Nina Roth	4	1	4	3	3	X	X	X	X	X	15

=== Draw 5 ===
Tuesday, February 14, 8:00pm

Team	1	2	3	4	5	6	7	8	9	10	Final
Cora Farrell	1	0	0	1	0	1	0	0	0	X	3
Cassie Potter	0	1	3	0	1	0	1	1	1	X	8

Team	1	2	3	4	5	6	7	8	9	10	Final
Jamie Sinclair	0	2	0	2	0	0	0	0	0	1	5
Nina Roth	0	0	2	0	0	0	0	1	0	0	3

Team	1	2	3	4	5	6	7	8	9	10	Final
Cory Christensen	3	0	1	0	1	1	1	0	4	X	11
Becca Wood	0	0	0	1	0	0	0	1	0	X	2

Team	1	2	3	4	5	6	7	8	9	10	11	Final
Jessica Schultz	2	1	0	2	1	1	0	0	0	0	1	8
Cristin Clark	0	0	2	0	0	0	2	1	1	1	0	7

=== Draw 6 ===
Wednesday, February 15, 2:00pm

Team	1	2	3	4	5	6	7	8	9	10	Final
Cristin Clark	0	0	0	0	1	1	0	0	X	X	2
Nina Roth	0	3	1	2	0	0	2	1	X	X	9

Team	1	2	3	4	5	6	7	8	9	10	Final
Jessica Schultz	0	2	1	1	0	0	0	5	0	X	9
Becca Wood	1	0	0	0	1	1	1	0	1	X	5

Team	1	2	3	4	5	6	7	8	9	10	Final
Cassie Potter	0	1	0	1	0	0	0	0	X	X	2
Jamie Sinclair	0	0	2	0	0	0	4	2	X	X	8

Team	1	2	3	4	5	6	7	8	9	10	11	Final
Cory Christensen	0	1	0	2	0	0	2	0	1	1	0	7
Cora Farrell	1	0	3	0	1	1	0	1	0	0	2	9

=== Draw 7 ===
Thursday, February 16, 8:00am

Team	1	2	3	4	5	6	7	8	9	10	Final
Jamie Sinclair	0	2	0	1	0	2	0	4	X	X	9
Cristin Clark	1	0	0	0	1	0	1	0	X	X	3

Team	1	2	3	4	5	6	7	8	9	10	11	Final
Jessica Schultz	0	1	0	0	0	0	0	3	0	0	1	5
Cory Christensen	0	0	1	1	0	1	0	0	0	1	0	4

Team	1	2	3	4	5	6	7	8	9	10	Final
Nina Roth	0	0	1	0	2	1	2	0	2	X	8
Cassie Potter	1	0	0	2	0	0	0	1	0	X	4

Team	1	2	3	4	5	6	7	8	9	10	Final
Becca Wood	1	0	1	0	0	0	1	0	1	X	4
Cora Farrell	0	2	0	3	1	2	0	1	0	X	9

== Playoffs ==
Semifinal			Final
			1	(Minnesota) Jamie Sinclair	6
2	(Minnesota) Cassie Potter	1	3	(Minnesota) Nina Roth	4
3	(Minnesota) Nina Roth	8

=== Semifinal ===
Friday, February 17, 12:00 pm PT

Team	1	2	3	4	5	6	7	8	9	10	Final
(Minnesota) Cassie Potter	0	1	0	0	0	0	X	X	X	X	1
(Minnesota) Nina Roth	2	0	0	2	1	3	X	X	X	X	8

Player percentages
(Minnesota) Team Potter		(Minnesota) Team Roth	
Stephanie Bohan	87%	Becca Hamilton	97%
Sophie Bader	49%	Aileen Geving	88%
Jackie Lemke	69%	Tabitha Peterson	94%
Cassie Potter	64%	Nina Roth	92%
Total	67%	Total	93%

=== Final ===
Saturday, February 18, 11:00 am PT

Team	1	2	3	4	5	6	7	8	9	10	Final
(Minnesota) Jamie Sinclair	0	2	0	0	2	0	1	0	1	X	6
(Minnesota) Nina Roth	0	0	0	1	0	2	0	1	0	X	4

Player percentages
(Minnesota) Team Sinclair		(Minnesota) Team Roth	
Monica Walker	80%	Becca Hamilton	93%
Vicky Persinger	90%	Aileen Geving	88%
Alexandra Carlson	86%	Tabitha Peterson	76%
Jamie Sinclair	77%	Nina Roth	84%
Total	83%	Total	85%
