= Jamie Haskell =

American curler (born 1980)

- Curler
- Born: July 18, 1980 (age 46); Bemidji, Minnesota

Team
- Curling club: Bemidji CC, Bemidji, Minnesota
- Skip: Cassandra Potter
- Third: Jamie Haskell
- Second: Jackie Lemke
- Lead: Stephanie Sambor
- Alternate: Laura Roessler
- Mixed doubles partner: Nate Haskell

Curling career
- World Championship: 1 (2005)
- World Mixed Doubles Championship: 1 (2008)
- Olympic: 1 (2006)
Medal record
Curling
Representing United States
World Curling Championships
Silver medal – second place	2005 Paisley	Team
US Olympic Trials
Gold medal – first place	2005 Madison	Team
Bronze medal – third place	2001 Ogden	Team
Bronze medal – third place	2013 Fargo	Team
US Women's Championship
Gold medal – first place	2005 Madison
Silver medal – second place	2007 Utica
Silver medal – second place	2012 Philadelphia
Bronze medal – third place	2011 Fargo
Bronze medal – third place	2014 Philadelphia
US Mixed Doubles Championship
Gold medal – first place	2008 Bemidji
Silver medal – second place	2009 Two Harbors

Jamie Haskell (née Johnson; born July 18, 1980) is an American curler. Haskell was born in Bemidji, Minnesota. She was a member of the United States women's curling team at the 2006 Winter Olympics and is the older sister of skip Cassandra Potter.

== Career ==
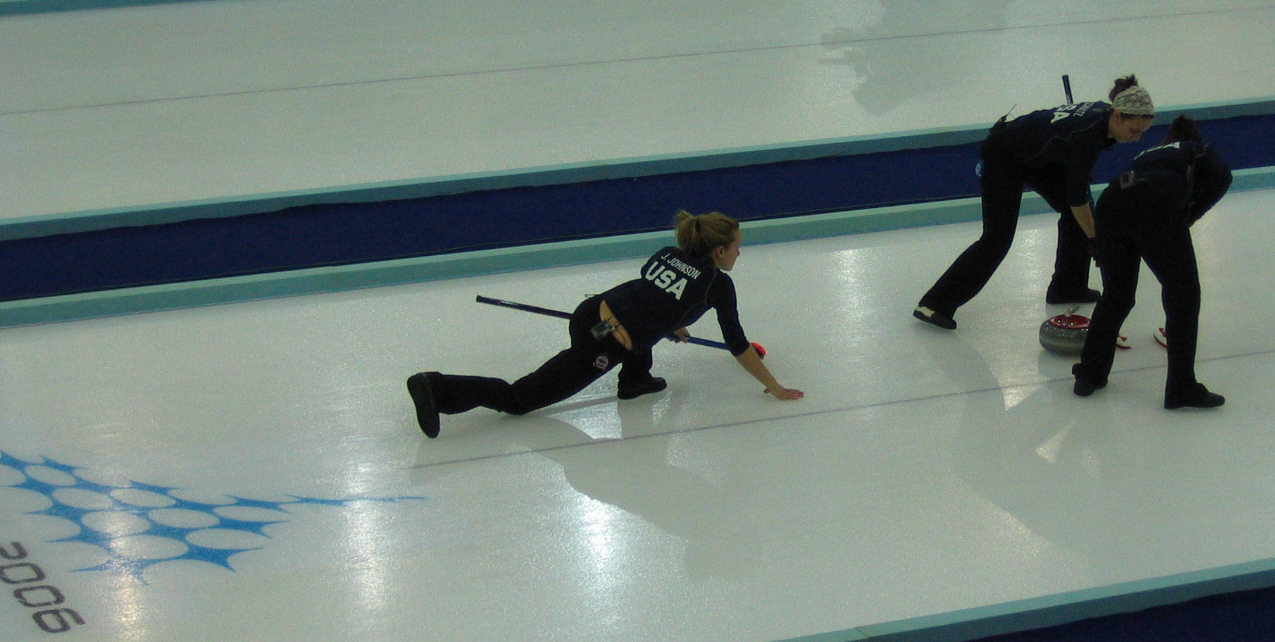
Jamie Johnson at Turin 2006

Haskell usually plays third on her sister's team, and together they have won the silver medal at the 2005 World Championships, the championship at the United States Olympic Trials in February 2005, and the gold medal at the 2002 World Junior Championships.

As a junior curler Haskell competed at the United States Junior Championships six times, earning a medal every time. She finally achieved the gold medal her last year, 2002, playing on her sister's team. As US Junior Champion Haskell represented the United States at the 2002 World Junior Championships where they won the gold medal.

In 2002 Haskell also made her debut appearance at the United States Women's Championship, a championship she would return to 11 more times in the next 12 years. At her 12 appearances at the US Championship she won five medals, gold in 2005 (which was also the Olympic Trials), silver in 2007 and 2012, and bronze in 2011 and 2014.

Winning the US Championship in 2005 earned Haskell a spot at the 2005 World Championship as well as the 2006 Winter Olympics in Turin. Team USA earned the silver medal at World's, losing in the final to Team Sweden, skipped by Anette Norberg. Coming off of the successful World Championship, Haskell and her teammates' trip to the Winter Olympics did not go as well, as the team finished second-to-last with just 2 wins. The team was the youngest ever to represent the United States in curling at the elite level, with an average age of 22.

Haskell, with her husband Nate Haskell, won the first United States Mixed Doubles Championship in 2008. This earned them a spot at the first World Mixed Doubles Championship, held in Vierumäki, Finland. At World's they failed to make the playoffs, finishing the round robin with a record of 3–4. Haskell and her husband returned to the US Mixed Doubles Championship in 2009 and made it to the final, only to lose to Brady and Cristin Clark, whom they had defeated in the semifinals the previous year.

== Personal life ==
The Johnson sisters were born into a curling family, their grandparents and great-grandparents were curlers and their parents, Tim and Liz Johnson, have won the U.S. National Mixed Curling title four times.

Like her sister, Haskell studied Design Technology at Bemidji State University, but her emphasis was in exhibit design while Cassie specialized in graphic design. Haskell finished her degree in 2005.

Jamie is married to Nate Haskell.

== Teams ==
=== Women's ===
Season	Skip	Third	Second	Lead	Alternate	Coach	Events
1995–96	Stacey Liapis	Jamie Johnson	Cassandra Johnson	Tina Kelly			1996 USJCC (SF)
1997–98	Cassandra Johnson	Jamie Johnson	Tina Kelly	Kristy Matson			1998 USJCC (silver)
1997–98	Hope Schmitt	Nikki Baird	Katlyn Schmitt	Teresa Bahr	Cassandra Johnson		1998 WJCC (5th)
1998–99	Cassandra Johnson	Jamie Johnson	Tina Kelly	Kristy Matson		Liz Johnson	1999 USJCC (SF)
1999–00	Cassandra Johnson	Jamie Johnson	Tina Kelly	Kristy Matson		Liz Johnson	2000 USJCC (SF)
2000–01	Cassandra Johnson	Jamie Johnson	Tina Kelly	Kristy Matson		Jim Dexter	2001 USJCC (silver)
2001–02	Cassandra Johnson	Jamie Johnson	Hope Schmitt	Teresa Bahr Oberstein			2001 USOCT (bronze); 2002 USWCC (SF)
2001–02	Cassandra Johnson	Jamie Johnson	Katie Beck	Maureen Brunt	Courtney George (WJCC)	Jim Dexter	2002 USJCC (gold); 2002 WJCC (gold)
2002–03	Cassandra Johnson	Jamie Johnson	Katie Beck	Maureen Brunt			2003 USWCC (SF)
2003–04	Cassandra Johnson	Jamie Johnson	Katie Beck	Maureen Brunt		Neil Does	2004 USWCC (SF)
2004–05	Cassandra Johnson	Jamie Johnson	Jessica Schultz	Maureen Brunt	Courtney George (WWCC)	Neil Does (WWCC)	2005 USWCC/USOCT (gold); 2005 WWCC (silver)
2005–06	Cassandra Johnson	Jamie Johnson	Jessica Schultz	Maureen Brunt	Courtney George	Neil Does	2006 OG (8th)
2005–06	Jessica Schultz	Jamie Johnson	Courtney George	Maureen Brunt		Neil Does	2006 USWCC (4th)
2006–07	Cassandra Johnson	Jamie Haskell	Jessica Schultz	Maureen Brunt			2007 USWCC (silver)
2007–08	Cassandra Potter	Jamie Haskell	Jessica Schultz	Maureen Brunt	Jackie Lemke	Jim Dexter	2008 USWCC (4th)
2008–09	Cassandra Potter	Jamie Haskell	Laura Roessler	Jackie Lemke			2009 USWCC/USOCT (6th)
2010–11	Cassandra Potter	Jamie Haskell	Maureen Stolt	Stephanie Sambor			2011 USWCC (bronze)
2011–12	Cassandra Potter	Jamie Haskell	Jackie Lemke	Stephanie Sambor			2012 USWCC (silver)
2012–13	Laura Roessler	Jamie Haskell	Jackie Lemke	Stephanie Sambor			2013 USWCC (6th)
2013–14	Cassandra Potter	Jamie Haskell	Jackie Lemke	Stephanie Sambor			2013 USOCT (3rd); 2014 USWCC (bronze)

=== Mixed doubles ===
Season	Female	Male	Events
2007–08	Jamie Haskell	Nate Haskell	2008 USMDCC (gold); 2008 WMDCC (15)
2008–09	Jamie Haskell	Nate Haskell	2009 USMDCC (silver)
