= 2013 United States Olympic curling trials =

2013 United States Olympic Curling Trials
- Host city: Fargo, North Dakota
- Arena: Scheels Arena
- Dates: November 10–17, 2013
- Men's winner: (Minnesota) John Shuster
- Curling club: Duluth CC, Duluth, Minnesota
- Skip: John Shuster
- Third: Jeff Isaacson
- Second: Jared Zezel
- Lead: John Landsteiner
- Coach: Tim Muller
- Finalist: (Minnesota) Pete Fenson
- Women's winner: (Wisconsin) Erika Brown
- Curling club: Madison CC, Madison, Wisconsin
- Skip: Erika Brown
- Third: Debbie McCormick
- Second: Jessica Schultz
- Lead: Ann Swisshelm
- Coach: Bill Todhunter
- Finalist: (Minnesota) Allison Pottinger

The 2013 United States Olympic Curling Trials was held from November 10 to 17, 2013 at the Scheels Arena in Fargo, North Dakota. The trials were held to determine the women's team that would represent the United States at the curling tournament at the 2014 Winter Olympics and the men's team that would represent the United States at the qualification event for the same Olympics.

== Road to the Trials ==
Teams on the men's and women's sides qualified for the Olympic Trials either directly – by finishing in first or second place at the 2012 and 2013 National Curling Championships – or through selection by the United States Curling Association's High Performance Program (HPP) Selection Committee. The committee's selections were based on prior performance at World and National Championships, Order of Merit rankings, and performance in World Curling Tour events in the three years preceding the Trials (2011–2013).

For the men's tournament, a maximum of five teams competed for the right to represent the United States at the qualification event for the Winter Olympics. The first and second placed teams from the 2012 National Championships and from the 2013 National Championships qualified directly for the Trials. If both of the directly qualifying teams from the 2013 National Championships already qualified via the 2012 National Championships, giving a total of two directly qualified teams, the HPP Selection Committee would select two additional teams to compete in the Trials, making a total of four teams. If one of the directly qualifying teams from the 2013 National Championships already qualified via the 2012 National Championships, giving a total of three directly qualified teams, the selection committee would select one additional team to compete in the Trials, making a total of four teams. However, if two or more American teams had placed within the top twenty of the Order of Merit, and if at least one of those two teams had not earned a qualification spot in the Trials, the selection committee would choose two additional teams, bringing the total to five teams. If none of the aforementioned scenarios applies, which would imply a total of four directly qualifying teams, the selection committee would choose one additional team to compete in the Trials, bringing the total to five teams.

For the women's tournament, a total of four teams competed for the right to represent the United States at the Winter Olympics. The first and second placed teams from the 2012 National Championships qualified directly for the Trials, along with the first placed team from the 2013 National Championships. If the first placed team from the 2013 National Championships had already qualified for the Trials via the 2012 National Championships, the second placed team would qualify for the Trials. If the second place team from the 2013 National Championships had also already qualified for the Trials via the 2012 National Championships, the selection committee would select two additional teams to compete in the Trials. Otherwise, if there was a directly qualifying team from the 2013 National Championships, the selection committee would select one additional team to compete in the Trials.

== Men ==
=== Teams ===
The teams were as follows:

Skip	Third	Second	Lead	Alternate	Locale	Qualification method
Heath McCormick	Bill Stopera	Martin Sather	Dean Gemmell		(New York (state)) New York, New York	2012 National Championships, First place
Pete Fenson	Shawn Rojeski	Joe Polo	Ryan Brunt		Bemidji, Minnesota	2012 National Championships, Second place
Brady Clark	Sean Beighton	Darren Lehto	Philip Tilker	Greg Persinger	(Washington (state)) Seattle, Washington	2013 National Championships, First place
Chris Plys (fourth)	Tyler George (skip)	Richard Ruohonen	Colin Hufman	Craig Brown	Duluth, Minnesota	2013 National Championships, Second place
John Shuster	Jeff Isaacson	Jared Zezel	John Landsteiner		Duluth, Minnesota	High Performance Program committee selection

=== Round Robin Standings ===
Final Round Robin Standings

Key
Teams to Final

Skip	W	L	PF	PA	Ends Won	Ends Lost	Blank Ends	Stolen Ends	Shot Pct.
(Minnesota) John Shuster	6	2	54	40	32	28	12	9	86%
(Minnesota) Pete Fenson	5	3	51	46	33	30	15	7	85%
(New York (state)) Heath McCormick	4	4	55	49	37	32	8	10	80%
(Minnesota) Tyler George	4	4	52	48	31	34	9	4	84%
(Washington (state)) Brady Clark	1	7	34	58	26	34	8	2	80%

=== Round Robin Results ===
All draw times are listed in Central Standard Time (UTC−6).

==== Draw 1 ====
Sunday, November 10, 1:00 pm

Sheet C	1	2	3	4	5	6	7	8	9	10	Final
(Washington (state)) Brady Clark	0	2	1	0	0	2	0	0	1	0	6
(Minnesota) Pete Fenson 🔨	1	0	0	3	0	0	1	1	0	2	8

Sheet D	1	2	3	4	5	6	7	8	9	10	Final
(New York (state)) Heath McCormick 🔨	0	2	0	1	1	0	2	0	2	X	8
(Minnesota) Tyler George	0	0	2	0	0	1	0	2	0	X	5

==== Draw 2 ====
Sunday, November 10, 7:00 pm

Sheet D	1	2	3	4	5	6	7	8	9	10	Final
(Washington (state)) Brady Clark 🔨	1	0	0	0	1	0	2	0	X	X	4
(Minnesota) John Shuster	0	2	1	1	0	1	0	5	X	X	10

Sheet E	1	2	3	4	5	6	7	8	9	10	Final
(Minnesota) Pete Fenson	0	0	1	0	1	0	2	0	X	X	4
(Minnesota) Tyler George 🔨	0	1	0	3	0	1	0	4	X	X	9

==== Draw 3 ====
Monday, November 11, 12:00 pm

Sheet B	1	2	3	4	5	6	7	8	9	10	Final
(Minnesota) Tyler George	0	0	2	0	2	0	3	1	X	X	8
(Washington (state)) Brady Clark 🔨	0	1	0	1	0	1	0	0	X	X	3

Sheet C	1	2	3	4	5	6	7	8	9	10	11	Final
(Minnesota) John Shuster	0	0	1	1	0	0	1	0	2	0	1	6
(New York (state)) Heath McCormick 🔨	0	1	0	0	0	2	0	1	0	1	0	5

==== Draw 4 ====
Monday, November 11, 7:00 pm

Sheet B	1	2	3	4	5	6	7	8	9	10	11	Final
(Minnesota) Pete Fenson 🔨	0	1	0	0	1	1	0	2	0	0	1	6
(New York (state)) Heath McCormick	1	0	0	0	0	0	1	0	2	1	0	5

Sheet E	1	2	3	4	5	6	7	8	9	10	Final
(Minnesota) Tyler George 🔨	0	1	0	3	0	0	1	0	0	X	5
(Minnesota) John Shuster	0	0	2	0	2	0	0	2	2	X	8

==== Draw 5 ====
Tuesday, November 12, 12:00 pm

Sheet C	1	2	3	4	5	6	7	8	9	10	Final
(New York (state)) Heath McCormick 🔨	0	1	1	1	1	0	0	1	0	0	5
(Washington (state)) Brady Clark	1	0	0	0	0	0	3	0	0	2	6

Sheet D	1	2	3	4	5	6	7	8	9	10	Final
(Minnesota) John Shuster 🔨	2	0	0	1	0	0	2	0	0	X	5
(Minnesota) Pete Fenson	0	0	1	0	3	0	0	3	1	X	8

==== Draw 6 ====
Tuesday, November 12, 7:00 pm

Sheet B	1	2	3	4	5	6	7	8	9	10	11	Final
(Minnesota) Tyler George 🔨	2	0	1	0	0	0	1	0	2	0	1	7
(Minnesota) Pete Fenson	0	2	0	0	0	1	0	2	0	1	0	6

Sheet E	1	2	3	4	5	6	7	8	9	10	Final
(Minnesota) John Shuster 🔨	1	0	2	4	0	X	X	X	X	X	7
(Washington (state)) Brady Clark	0	1	0	0	1	X	X	X	X	X	2

==== Draw 7 ====
Wednesday, November 13, 12:00 pm

Sheet C	1	2	3	4	5	6	7	8	9	10	Final
(Minnesota) Pete Fenson 🔨	3	1	2	0	1	0	2	0	0	X	9
(New York (state)) Heath McCormick	0	0	0	2	0	2	0	1	1	X	6

Sheet D	1	2	3	4	5	6	7	8	9	10	Final
(Washington (state)) Brady Clark 🔨	1	0	2	0	0	0	1	0	0	0	4
(Minnesota) Tyler George	0	1	0	2	1	0	0	0	2	2	8

==== Draw 8 ====
Wednesday, November 13, 7:00 pm

Sheet B	1	2	3	4	5	6	7	8	9	10	Final
(New York (state)) Heath McCormick 🔨	0	1	2	0	1	0	0	3	0	1	8
(Minnesota) John Shuster	1	0	0	2	0	2	0	0	2	0	7

Sheet E	1	2	3	4	5	6	7	8	9	10	Final
(Washington (state)) Brady Clark	0	0	0	1	0	1	0	1	1	0	4
(Minnesota) Pete Fenson 🔨	0	2	0	0	2	0	1	0	0	2	7

==== Draw 9 ====
Thursday, November 14, 9:00 am

Sheet C	1	2	3	4	5	6	7	8	9	10	Final
(Minnesota) Tyler George 🔨	0	1	0	0	1	0	2	0	1	0	5
(Minnesota) John Shuster	1	0	2	1	0	1	0	1	0	1	7

Sheet D	1	2	3	4	5	6	7	8	9	10	Final
(New York (state)) Heath McCormick	0	3	0	4	0	1	0	2	X	X	10
(Washington (state)) Brady Clark 🔨	1	0	1	0	2	0	1	0	X	X	5

==== Draw 10 ====
Thursday, November 14, 3:30 pm

Sheet D	1	2	3	4	5	6	7	8	9	10	Final
(Minnesota) John Shuster 🔨	0	0	0	0	3	0	0	1	0	0	4
(Minnesota) Pete Fenson	0	0	0	0	0	0	1	0	1	1	3

Sheet E	1	2	3	4	5	6	7	8	9	10	Final
(New York (state)) Heath McCormick	2	0	1	0	1	0	2	1	1	X	8
(Minnesota) Tyler George 🔨	0	2	0	2	0	1	0	0	0	X	5

=== Final ===
The final round will be between the top two teams at the end of the round robin. The teams will play a best-of-three series.

Finals
1	(Minnesota) John Shuster	9	4	11
2	(Minnesota) Pete Fenson	8	5	1

==== Game 1 ====
Friday, November 15, 2:30 pm

Sheet C	1	2	3	4	5	6	7	8	9	10	11	Final
(Minnesota) John Shuster 🔨	2	0	0	1	0	4	1	0	0	0	1	9
(Minnesota) Pete Fenson	0	2	0	0	1	0	0	2	2	1	0	8

Player percentages
(Minnesota) John Shuster		(Minnesota) Pete Fenson	
John Landsteiner	86%	Ryan Brunt	94%
Jared Zezel	91%	Joe Polo	89%
Jeff Isaacson	87%	Shawn Rojeski	82%
John Shuster	81%	Pete Fenson	82%
Total	86%	Total	87%

==== Game 2 ====
Saturday, November 16, 2:30pm

Sheet C	1	2	3	4	5	6	7	8	9	10	11	Final
(Minnesota) John Shuster	0	2	0	1	0	0	0	0	0	1	0	4
(Minnesota) Pete Fenson 🔨	1	0	1	0	1	0	0	1	0	0	1	5

Player percentages
(Minnesota) John Shuster		(Minnesota) Pete Fenson	
John Landsteiner	77%	Ryan Brunt	91%
Jared Zezel	91%	Joe Polo	92%
Jeff Isaacson	81%	Shawn Rojeski	84%
John Shuster	86%	Pete Fenson	91%
Total	84%	Total	90%

==== Game 3 ====
Sunday, November 17, 11:00 am

Sheet C	1	2	3	4	5	6	7	8	9	10	Final
(Minnesota) John Shuster 🔨	2	0	5	4	X	X	X	X	X	X	11
(Minnesota) Pete Fenson	0	1	0	0	X	X	X	X	X	X	1

Player percentages
(Minnesota) John Shuster		(Minnesota) Pete Fenson	
John Landsteiner	100%	Ryan Brunt	100%
Jared Zezel	80%	Joe Polo	61%
Jeff Isaacson	93%	Shawn Rojeski	58%
John Shuster	94%	Pete Fenson	40%
Total	92%	Total	65%

== Women ==
=== Teams ===
The teams are listed as follows:

Skip	Third	Second	Lead	Alternate	Locale	Qualification method
Allison Pottinger	Nicole Joraanstad	Natalie Nicholson	Tabitha Peterson		St. Paul, Minnesota	2012 National Championships, First place
Cassandra Potter	Jamie Haskell	Jaclyn Lemke	Stephanie Sambor		St. Paul, Minnesota	2012 National Championships, Second place
Erika Brown	Debbie McCormick	Jessica Schultz	Ann Swisshelm		Madison, Wisconsin	2013 National Championships, First place
Courtney George	Aileen Sormunen	Amanda McLean	Monica Walker	Jordan Moulton	Duluth, Minnesota	High Performance Program committee selection

=== Round Robin Standings ===
Final Round Robin Standings

Key
Teams to Final

Skip	W	L	PF	PA	Ends Won	Ends Lost	Blank Ends	Stolen Ends	Shot Pct.
(Wisconsin) Erika Brown	4	2	45	33	28	23	6	9	84%
(Minnesota) Allison Pottinger	4	2	40	36	28	21	11	9	83%
(Minnesota) Courtney George	2	4	36	45	22	31	3	3	75%
(Minnesota) Cassandra Potter	2	4	40	46	26	29	4	6	79%

=== Round Robin Results ===
All draw times are listed in Central Standard Time (UTC−6).

==== Draw 1 ====
Monday, November 11, 7:00 pm

Sheet C	1	2	3	4	5	6	7	8	9	10	11	12	Final
(Minnesota) Cassandra Potter 🔨	1	0	0	1	0	0	4	0	0	2	0	0	8
(Minnesota) Allison Pottinger	0	1	0	0	3	1	0	3	0	0	0	1	9

Sheet D	1	2	3	4	5	6	7	8	9	10	Final
(Wisconsin) Erika Brown 🔨	2	2	0	2	1	0	1	0	2	X	10
(Minnesota) Courtney George	0	0	1	0	0	1	0	1	0	X	3

==== Draw 2 ====
Tuesday, November 12, 12:00 pm

Sheet B	1	2	3	4	5	6	7	8	9	10	Final
(Minnesota) Allison Pottinger	0	1	2	0	0	0	1	0	2	1	7
(Wisconsin) Erika Brown 🔨	3	0	0	1	0	1	0	1	0	0	6

Sheet E	1	2	3	4	5	6	7	8	9	10	Final
(Minnesota) Courtney George	0	2	0	1	0	4	0	0	3	X	10
(Minnesota) Cassandra Potter 🔨	1	0	1	0	2	0	1	1	0	X	6

==== Draw 3 ====
Tuesday, November 12, 7:00 pm

Sheet C	1	2	3	4	5	6	7	8	9	10	Final
(Wisconsin) Erika Brown 🔨	0	2	2	0	2	0	1	0	1	0	8
(Minnesota) Cassandra Potter	1	0	0	1	0	2	0	1	0	2	7

Sheet D	1	2	3	4	5	6	7	8	9	10	Final
(Minnesota) Courtney George 🔨	0	1	0	0	0	4	1	0	0	1	7
(Minnesota) Allison Pottinger	1	0	0	1	1	0	0	1	1	0	5

==== Draw 4 ====
Wednesday, November 13, 12:00 pm

Sheet B	1	2	3	4	5	6	7	8	9	10	Final
(Wisconsin) Erika Brown 🔨	3	2	2	0	2	0	1	0	X	X	10
(Minnesota) Courtney George	0	0	0	2	0	1	0	1	X	X	4

Sheet E	1	2	3	4	5	6	7	8	9	10	Final
(Minnesota) Cassandra Potter	0	0	1	0	0	0	2	1	X	X	4
(Minnesota) Allison Pottinger 🔨	3	1	0	1	1	2	0	0	X	X	8

==== Draw 5 ====
Wednesday, November 13, 7:00 pm

Sheet C	1	2	3	4	5	6	7	8	9	10	Final
(Minnesota) Allison Pottinger 🔨	2	0	2	0	0	1	1	0	0	1	7
(Minnesota) Courtney George	0	2	0	3	0	0	0	1	0	0	6

Sheet D	1	2	3	4	5	6	7	8	9	10	Final
(Minnesota) Cassandra Potter	0	0	0	1	2	3	0	0	0	2	8
(Wisconsin) Erika Brown 🔨	2	1	1	0	0	0	0	1	1	0	6

==== Draw 6 ====
Thursday, November 14, 9:00 am

Sheet B	1	2	3	4	5	6	7	8	9	10	Final
(Minnesota) Courtney George 🔨	0	0	2	0	1	1	1	0	1	0	6
(Minnesota) Cassandra Potter	1	1	0	2	0	0	0	2	0	1	7

Sheet E	1	2	3	4	5	6	7	8	9	10	Final
(Minnesota) Allison Pottinger	0	1	0	2	0	0	0	1	0	0	4
(Wisconsin) Erika Brown 🔨	0	0	1	0	3	0	0	0	0	1	5

=== Final ===
The final round was between the top two teams at the end of the round robin. The teams played a best-of-three series.

Finals
1	(Wisconsin) Erika Brown	7	8
2	(Minnesota) Allison Pottinger	5	7

==== Game 1 ====
Friday, November 15, 2:30 pm

Sheet C	1	2	3	4	5	6	7	8	9	10	Final
(Wisconsin) Erika Brown 🔨	2	0	1	0	0	0	3	0	1	0	7
(Minnesota) Allison Pottinger	0	1	0	0	1	0	0	2	0	1	5

Player percentages
(Wisconsin) Erika Brown		(Minnesota) Allison Pottinger	
Ann Swisshelm	88%	Tabitha Peterson	90%
Jessica Schultz	89%	Natalie Nicholson	91%
Debbie McCormick	83%	Nicole Joraanstad	76%
Erika Brown	95%	Allison Pottinger	77%
Total	89%	Total	84%

==== Game 2 ====
Saturday, November 16, 7:00 pm

Sheet C	1	2	3	4	5	6	7	8	9	10	Final
(Wisconsin) Erika Brown 🔨	0	2	0	2	0	1	0	2	0	1	8
(Minnesota) Allison Pottinger	1	0	1	0	2	0	1	0	2	0	7

Player percentages
(Wisconsin) Erika Brown		(Minnesota) Allison Pottinger	
Ann Swisshelm	92%	Tabitha Peterson	88%
Jessica Schultz	89%	Natalie Nicholson	85%
Debbie McCormick	81%	Nicole Joraanstad	83%
Erika Brown	80%	Allison Pottinger	76%
Total	86%	Total	83%
