= 2002 World Junior Curling Championships =

- Host city: Kelowna, British Columbia, Canada
- Arena: Kelowna Curling Club
- Dates: March 23–31, 2002
- Men's winner: Canada
- Skip: David Hamblin
- Third: Ross Derksen
- Second: Kevin Hamblin
- Lead: Ross McCannell
- Alternate: Douglas Hamblin
- Coach: Lorne Hamblin
- Finalist: Sweden (Eric Carlsén)
- Women's winner: United States
- Skip: Cassandra Johnson
- Third: Jamie Johnson
- Second: Katie Beck
- Lead: Maureen Brunt
- Alternate: Courtney George
- Coach: Jim Dexter
- Finalist: Sweden (Matilda Mattsson)

The 2002 World Junior Curling Championships were held at the Kelowna Curling Club in Kelowna, British Columbia, Canada March 23–31.

== Men's ==
| Country | Skip | Wins | Losses |
|---|---|---|---|
| Canada | David Hamblin | 8 | 1 |
| Sweden | Eric Carlsén | 8 | 1 |
| Switzerland | Andreas Hingher | 5 | 4 |
| Scotland | Kenny Edwards | 5 | 4 |
| Russia | Alexander Kirikov | 4 | 5 |
| Germany | Christian Baumann | 4 | 5 |
| Denmark | Casper Bossen | 4 | 5 |
| Norway | Thomas Løvold | 3 | 6 |
| United States | Leo Johnson | 3 | 6 |
| Japan | Yukihiro Murakami | 1 | 8 |

=== Playoffs ===
Semi-final
1 | Canada | 6
4 | Scotland | 3
2 | Sweden | 6
3 | Switzerland | 4

Final
1 | Canada | 3
2 | Sweden | 2
Bronze medal
3 | Switzerland | 3
4 | Scotland | 10

== Women's ==
| Country | Skip | Wins | Losses |
|---|---|---|---|
| Sweden | Matilda Mattsson | 8 | 1 |
| Canada | Suzanne Gaudet | 8 | 1 |
| United States | Cassandra Johnson | 7 | 2 |
| Italy | Diana Gaspari | 5 | 4 |
| Germany | Daniela Jentsch | 4 | 5 |
| Scotland | Kelly Wood | 4 | 5 |
| Switzerland | Corinne Bourquin | 4 | 5 |
| Russia | Nkeiruka Ezekh | 2 | 7 |
| Norway | Linn Githmark | 2 | 7 |
| Japan | Mari Motohashi | 1 | 8 |

=== Playoffs ===
Semi-final
1 | Sweden | 8
4 | Italy | 4
2 | Canada | 6
3 | United States | 7

Final
1 | Sweden | 6
3 | United States | 7
Bronze medal
2 | Canada | 9
4 | Italy | 8

== Sources ==
- Men's results from the World Curling Federation
- Women's results from the World Curling Federation
