= 2014 United States Women's Curling Championship =

- Host city: Philadelphia, Pennsylvania
- Arena: IceWorks Skating Complex
- Dates: March 1–8
- Winner: (Wisconsin) Nina Spatola
- Curling club: Madison CC, Madison
- Skip: Nina Spatola
- Third: Becca Hamilton
- Second: Tara Peterson
- Lead: Sophie Brorson
- Finalist: (Minnesota) Allison Pottinger

The 2014 Labatt United States Women's Curling Championship was held from March 1 to 8 at the IceWorks Skating Complex in Philadelphia, Pennsylvania. It was held in conjunction with the 2014 United States Men's Curling Championship.

== Road to the Nationals ==
A total of ten teams will be able to participate in the women's national championship by qualifying through the High Performance Program, through the World Curling Tour Order of Merit, or through a challenge round.

== Teams ==
There will be ten teams participating in this year's national championship. The teams are listed as follows:

| Skip | Third | Second | Lead | Alternate | Locale | Qualification method |
|---|---|---|---|---|---|---|
| Allison Pottinger | Nicole Joraanstad | Natalie Nicholson | Tabitha Peterson | | St. Paul, Minnesota | High Performance Program committee selection |
| Cassandra Potter | Jamie Haskell | Jaclyn Lemke | Stephanie Sambor | | St. Paul, Minnesota | High Performance Program committee selection |
| Courtney George | Aileen Sormunen | Amanda McLean | Monica Walker | | Duluth, Minnesota | Order of Merit |
| Nina Spatola | Becca Hamilton | Tara Peterson | Sophie Brorson | | Madison, Wisconsin | Order of Merit |
| Alexandra Carlson | Jamie Sinclair | Emilia Juocys | Sherri Schummer | | St. Paul, Minnesota | Challenge Round |
| Caitlin Maroldo | Rebeca Andrew | Abigail Morrison | Emily Walker | | (New York (state)) Rochester, New York | Challenge Round |
| Abigayle Lindgren | Katie Sigurdson | Emily Lindgren | Kelsey Colwell | Madeline Shaft | Grand Forks, North Dakota | Challenge Round |
| Amy Lou Anderson | Megan Delaney | Theresa Hoffoss | Julie Smith | Shelly Kinney | St. Paul, Minnesota | Challenge Round |
| Sarah Anderson | Courtney Anderson-Slata | Taylor Anderson | Emily Anderson | | Philadelphia, Pennsylvania | Challenge Round |
| Gabrielle Coleman^{1} | Elle LeBeau | Maureen Stolt | Cynthia Eng-Dinsel | Em Good | (Washington (state)) Seattle, Washington^{2} | Challenge Round |

Notes

1. Coleman sat out due to illness for Draws 3 and 4, and Stolt replaced Coleman at the skip position. Coleman returned to play in Draw 5. She played as second in Draws 5–7, and played third in Draws 8 and 9, swapping positions with LeBeau.
2. The team's locale is listed as Seattle, Washington, based on the locale of the original skip of the team, Good. Coleman is from San Francisco, California, and Stolt, the team's alternate, is from Plymouth, Minnesota.

== Round-robin standings ==
Final round-robin standings

Key
| Teams to playoffs |
| Teams to Tiebreaker |

| Skip | W | L | PF | PA | Ends won | Ends Lost | Blank ends | Stolen ends | Shot pct. |
|---|---|---|---|---|---|---|---|---|---|
| (Minnesota) Allison Pottinger | 7 | 2 | 69 | 43 | 39 | 32 | 10 | 14 | 80% |
| (Wisconsin) Nina Spatola | 7 | 2 | 78 | 46 | 40 | 29 | 6 | 17 | 80% |
| (Minnesota) Cassandra Potter | 7 | 2 | 63 | 41 | 37 | 30 | 12 | 16 | 78% |
| (Minnesota) Courtney George | 6 | 3 | 68 | 48 | 40 | 30 | 10 | 17 | 79% |
| (Minnesota) Alexandra Carlson | 6 | 3 | 61 | 66 | 41 | 38 | 6 | 12 | 77% |
| (Pennsylvania) Sarah Anderson | 4 | 5 | 53 | 58 | 31 | 36 | 14 | 5 | 71% |
| (New York (state)) Caitlin Maroldo | 3 | 6 | 45 | 69 | 29 | 36 | 15 | 7 | 70% |
| (Washington (state)) Gabrielle Coleman | 3 | 6 | 46 | 65 | 35 | 39 | 12 | 9 | 73% |
| (North Dakota) Abigayle Lindgren | 1 | 8 | 52 | 75 | 31 | 45 | 9 | 2 | 71% |
| (Minnesota) Amy Lou Anderson | 1 | 8 | 41 | 75 | 29 | 39 | 8 | 6 | 68% |

== Round-robin results ==
All draw times are listed in Eastern Standard Time (UTC−7).

=== Draw 1 ===
Saturday, March 1, 4:30 pm

| Sheet 1 | 1 | 2 | 3 | 4 | 5 | 6 | 7 | 8 | 9 | 10 | Final |
|---|---|---|---|---|---|---|---|---|---|---|---|
| (Minnesota) Cassandra Potter | 0 | 3 | 0 | 2 | 0 | 1 | 2 | 0 | 0 | X | 8 |
| (Minnesota) Courtney George | 1 | 0 | 1 | 0 | 0 | 0 | 0 | 2 | 2 | X | 6 |

| Sheet 2 | 1 | 2 | 3 | 4 | 5 | 6 | 7 | 8 | 9 | 10 | 11 | Final |
|---|---|---|---|---|---|---|---|---|---|---|---|---|
| (New York (state)) Caitlin Maroldo | 0 | 1 | 0 | 1 | 0 | 2 | 0 | 2 | 2 | 0 | 2 | 10 |
| (North Dakota) Abigayle Lindgren | 0 | 0 | 3 | 0 | 2 | 0 | 2 | 0 | 0 | 1 | 0 | 8 |

| Sheet 3 | 1 | 2 | 3 | 4 | 5 | 6 | 7 | 8 | 9 | 10 | Final |
|---|---|---|---|---|---|---|---|---|---|---|---|
| (Minnesota) Alexandra Carlson | 2 | 0 | 3 | 0 | 2 | 0 | 0 | 1 | 0 | X | 8 |
| (Minnesota) Amy Lou Anderson | 0 | 1 | 0 | 1 | 0 | 1 | 1 | 0 | 2 | X | 6 |

| Sheet 4 | 1 | 2 | 3 | 4 | 5 | 6 | 7 | 8 | 9 | 10 | 11 | Final |
|---|---|---|---|---|---|---|---|---|---|---|---|---|
| (Minnesota) Allison Pottinger | 0 | 1 | 0 | 0 | 1 | 0 | 0 | 0 | 1 | 1 | 2 | 6 |
| (Pennsylvania) Sarah Anderson | 1 | 0 | 0 | 1 | 0 | 1 | 0 | 1 | 0 | 0 | 0 | 4 |

| Sheet 5 | 1 | 2 | 3 | 4 | 5 | 6 | 7 | 8 | 9 | 10 | Final |
|---|---|---|---|---|---|---|---|---|---|---|---|
| (Washington (state)) Gabrielle Coleman | 0 | 0 | 0 | 1 | 1 | 0 | 0 | X | X | X | 2 |
| (Wisconsin) Nina Spatola | 0 | 2 | 3 | 0 | 0 | 3 | 4 | X | X | X | 12 |

=== Draw 2 ===
Sunday, March 2, 8:00 am

| Sheet 1 | 1 | 2 | 3 | 4 | 5 | 6 | 7 | 8 | 9 | 10 | Final |
|---|---|---|---|---|---|---|---|---|---|---|---|
| (Wisconsin) Nina Spatola | 0 | 2 | 0 | 4 | 0 | 0 | 0 | 1 | X | X | 7 |
| (Minnesota) Amy Lou Anderson | 1 | 0 | 1 | 0 | 0 | 0 | 1 | 0 | X | X | 3 |

| Sheet 2 | 1 | 2 | 3 | 4 | 5 | 6 | 7 | 8 | 9 | 10 | Final |
|---|---|---|---|---|---|---|---|---|---|---|---|
| (Washington (state)) Gabrielle Coleman | 0 | 2 | 0 | 0 | 0 | 1 | 0 | 0 | 0 | X | 3 |
| (Minnesota) Courtney George | 1 | 0 | 2 | 1 | 1 | 0 | 2 | 2 | 1 | X | 10 |

| Sheet 3 | 1 | 2 | 3 | 4 | 5 | 6 | 7 | 8 | 9 | 10 | Final |
|---|---|---|---|---|---|---|---|---|---|---|---|
| (Pennsylvania) Sarah Anderson | 2 | 0 | 0 | 2 | 0 | 0 | 0 | 1 | 1 | X | 6 |
| (North Dakota) Abigayle Lindgren | 0 | 0 | 1 | 0 | 2 | 0 | 0 | 0 | 0 | X | 3 |

| Sheet 4 | 1 | 2 | 3 | 4 | 5 | 6 | 7 | 8 | 9 | 10 | Final |
|---|---|---|---|---|---|---|---|---|---|---|---|
| (Minnesota) Alexandra Carlson | 0 | 0 | 2 | 2 | 1 | 0 | 0 | 2 | 0 | 2 | 9 |
| (New York (state)) Caitlin Maroldo | 0 | 1 | 0 | 0 | 0 | 2 | 2 | 0 | 3 | 0 | 8 |

| Sheet 5 | 1 | 2 | 3 | 4 | 5 | 6 | 7 | 8 | 9 | 10 | Final |
|---|---|---|---|---|---|---|---|---|---|---|---|
| (Minnesota) Allison Pottinger | 0 | 0 | 2 | 1 | 1 | 0 | 0 | 1 | 0 | 1 | 6 |
| (Minnesota) Cassandra Potter | 0 | 1 | 0 | 0 | 0 | 2 | 0 | 0 | 1 | 0 | 4 |

=== Draw 3 ===
Sunday, March 2, 4:00 pm

| Sheet 1 | 1 | 2 | 3 | 4 | 5 | 6 | 7 | 8 | 9 | 10 | Final |
|---|---|---|---|---|---|---|---|---|---|---|---|
| (Minnesota) Alexandra Carlson | 1 | 0 | 1 | 0 | 1 | 0 | 2 | 1 | 0 | 1 | 7 |
| (North Dakota) Abigayle Lindgren | 0 | 1 | 0 | 1 | 0 | 2 | 0 | 0 | 2 | 0 | 6 |

| Sheet 2 | 1 | 2 | 3 | 4 | 5 | 6 | 7 | 8 | 9 | 10 | Final |
|---|---|---|---|---|---|---|---|---|---|---|---|
| (Minnesota) Amy Lou Anderson | 0 | 0 | 2 | 0 | 0 | 0 | 0 | X | X | X | 2 |
| (Minnesota) Allison Pottinger | 0 | 3 | 0 | 1 | 3 | 0 | 3 | X | X | X | 10 |

| Sheet 3 | 1 | 2 | 3 | 4 | 5 | 6 | 7 | 8 | 9 | 10 | Final |
|---|---|---|---|---|---|---|---|---|---|---|---|
| (New York (state)) Caitlin Maroldo | 0 | 0 | 1 | 0 | 1 | 0 | X | X | X | X | 2 |
| (Wisconsin) Nina Spatola | 3 | 1 | 0 | 3 | 0 | 2 | X | X | X | X | 9 |

| Sheet 4 | 1 | 2 | 3 | 4 | 5 | 6 | 7 | 8 | 9 | 10 | Final |
|---|---|---|---|---|---|---|---|---|---|---|---|
| (Washington (state)) Gabrielle Coleman | 0 | 0 | 3 | 0 | 1 | 0 | 0 | 0 | 1 | 1 | 6 |
| (Minnesota) Cassandra Potter | 1 | 0 | 0 | 1 | 0 | 0 | 2 | 1 | 0 | 0 | 5 |

| Sheet 5 | 1 | 2 | 3 | 4 | 5 | 6 | 7 | 8 | 9 | 10 | Final |
|---|---|---|---|---|---|---|---|---|---|---|---|
| (Pennsylvania) Sarah Anderson | 0 | 0 | 0 | 0 | 0 | 0 | 2 | 0 | 2 | 2 | 6 |
| (Minnesota) Courtney George | 0 | 1 | 0 | 0 | 0 | 3 | 0 | 1 | 0 | 0 | 5 |

=== Draw 4 ===
Monday, March 3, 12:00 pm

| Sheet 1 | 1 | 2 | 3 | 4 | 5 | 6 | 7 | 8 | 9 | 10 | Final |
|---|---|---|---|---|---|---|---|---|---|---|---|
| (Minnesota) Courtney George | 0 | 2 | 1 | 0 | 0 | 0 | 4 | 4 | X | X | 11 |
| (New York (state)) Caitlin Maroldo | 0 | 0 | 0 | 1 | 3 | 0 | 0 | 0 | X | X | 4 |

| Sheet 2 | 1 | 2 | 3 | 4 | 5 | 6 | 7 | 8 | 9 | 10 | Final |
|---|---|---|---|---|---|---|---|---|---|---|---|
| (Minnesota) Cassandra Potter | 0 | 1 | 2 | 0 | 1 | 2 | 0 | 3 | X | X | 9 |
| (Pennsylvania) Sarah Anderson | 1 | 0 | 0 | 1 | 0 | 0 | 1 | 0 | X | X | 3 |

| Sheet 3 | 1 | 2 | 3 | 4 | 5 | 6 | 7 | 8 | 9 | 10 | Final |
|---|---|---|---|---|---|---|---|---|---|---|---|
| (Washington (state)) Gabrielle Coleman | 0 | 1 | 0 | 1 | 0 | 1 | 0 | 2 | 0 | X | 4 |
| (Minnesota) Allison Pottinger | 2 | 0 | 3 | 0 | 1 | 0 | 2 | 0 | 1 | X | 9 |

| Sheet 4 | 1 | 2 | 3 | 4 | 5 | 6 | 7 | 8 | 9 | 10 | Final |
|---|---|---|---|---|---|---|---|---|---|---|---|
| (Minnesota) Amy Lou Anderson | 2 | 0 | 2 | 3 | 1 | 0 | 2 | 0 | 0 | 0 | 10 |
| (North Dakota) Abigayle Lindgren | 0 | 3 | 0 | 0 | 0 | 3 | 0 | 2 | 0 | 3 | 11 |

| Sheet 5 | 1 | 2 | 3 | 4 | 5 | 6 | 7 | 8 | 9 | 10 | Final |
|---|---|---|---|---|---|---|---|---|---|---|---|
| (Wisconsin) Nina Spatola | 3 | 2 | 0 | 4 | 0 | 0 | 3 | X | X | X | 12 |
| (Minnesota) Alexandra Carlson | 0 | 0 | 1 | 0 | 1 | 2 | 0 | X | X | X | 4 |

=== Draw 5 ===
Monday, March 3, 8:00 pm

| Sheet 1 | 1 | 2 | 3 | 4 | 5 | 6 | 7 | 8 | 9 | 10 | Final |
|---|---|---|---|---|---|---|---|---|---|---|---|
| (Pennsylvania) Sarah Anderson | 0 | 4 | 0 | 0 | 0 | 1 | 0 | 0 | 2 | 1 | 8 |
| (Minnesota) Alexandra Carlson | 0 | 0 | 3 | 0 | 1 | 0 | 4 | 1 | 0 | 0 | 9 |

| Sheet 2 | 1 | 2 | 3 | 4 | 5 | 6 | 7 | 8 | 9 | 10 | Final |
|---|---|---|---|---|---|---|---|---|---|---|---|
| (Minnesota) Allison Pottinger | 1 | 2 | 0 | 4 | 4 | X | X | X | X | X | 11 |
| (New York (state)) Caitlin Maroldo | 0 | 0 | 1 | 0 | 0 | X | X | X | X | X | 1 |

| Sheet 3 | 1 | 2 | 3 | 4 | 5 | 6 | 7 | 8 | 9 | 10 | Final |
|---|---|---|---|---|---|---|---|---|---|---|---|
| (Minnesota) Amy Lou Anderson | 2 | 0 | 0 | 0 | 2 | 0 | 0 | 1 | 1 | X | 6 |
| (Minnesota) Cassandra Potter | 0 | 0 | 1 | 2 | 0 | 2 | 3 | 0 | 0 | X | 8 |

| Sheet 4 | 1 | 2 | 3 | 4 | 5 | 6 | 7 | 8 | 9 | 10 | Final |
|---|---|---|---|---|---|---|---|---|---|---|---|
| (Minnesota) Courtney George | 0 | 0 | 0 | 1 | 1 | 0 | 0 | 0 | X | X | 2 |
| (Wisconsin) Nina Spatola | 1 | 3 | 1 | 0 | 0 | 1 | 2 | 1 | X | X | 9 |

| Sheet 5 | 1 | 2 | 3 | 4 | 5 | 6 | 7 | 8 | 9 | 10 | 11 | Final |
|---|---|---|---|---|---|---|---|---|---|---|---|---|
| (North Dakota) Abigayle Lindgren | 2 | 0 | 1 | 0 | 0 | 0 | 1 | 0 | 1 | 1 | 0 | 6 |
| (Washington (state)) Gabrielle Coleman | 0 | 2 | 0 | 2 | 1 | 0 | 0 | 1 | 0 | 0 | 1 | 7 |

=== Draw 6 ===
Tuesday, March 4, 12:00 pm

| Sheet 1 | 1 | 2 | 3 | 4 | 5 | 6 | 7 | 8 | 9 | 10 | Final |
|---|---|---|---|---|---|---|---|---|---|---|---|
| (Minnesota) Amy Lou Anderson | 0 | 0 | 2 | 0 | 0 | 2 | 0 | 0 | 0 | X | 4 |
| (Washington (state)) Gabrielle Coleman | 1 | 1 | 0 | 2 | 1 | 0 | 1 | 1 | 2 | X | 9 |

| Sheet 2 | 1 | 2 | 3 | 4 | 5 | 6 | 7 | 8 | 9 | 10 | Final |
|---|---|---|---|---|---|---|---|---|---|---|---|
| (Wisconsin) Nina Spatola | 1 | 0 | 0 | 0 | 0 | 0 | 2 | 0 | 1 | 0 | 4 |
| (Minnesota) Cassandra Potter | 0 | 0 | 2 | 0 | 1 | 0 | 0 | 2 | 0 | 1 | 6 |

| Sheet 3 | 1 | 2 | 3 | 4 | 5 | 6 | 7 | 8 | 9 | 10 | Final |
|---|---|---|---|---|---|---|---|---|---|---|---|
| (Minnesota) Courtney George | 0 | 0 | 1 | 0 | 1 | 2 | 0 | 2 | 0 | 1 | 7 |
| (Minnesota) Alexandra Carlson | 1 | 0 | 0 | 1 | 0 | 0 | 2 | 0 | 1 | 0 | 5 |

| Sheet 4 | 1 | 2 | 3 | 4 | 5 | 6 | 7 | 8 | 9 | 10 | Final |
|---|---|---|---|---|---|---|---|---|---|---|---|
| (North Dakota) Abigayle Lindgren | 0 | 1 | 0 | 1 | 0 | 2 | 0 | 0 | 1 | X | 5 |
| (Minnesota) Allison Pottinger | 1 | 0 | 2 | 0 | 3 | 0 | 0 | 2 | 0 | X | 8 |

| Sheet 5 | 1 | 2 | 3 | 4 | 5 | 6 | 7 | 8 | 9 | 10 | Final |
|---|---|---|---|---|---|---|---|---|---|---|---|
| (New York (state)) Caitlin Maroldo | 0 | 2 | 0 | 2 | 0 | 1 | 0 | 1 | 3 | 0 | 9 |
| (Pennsylvania) Sarah Anderson | 1 | 0 | 3 | 0 | 3 | 0 | 0 | 0 | 0 | 1 | 8 |

=== Draw 7 ===
Tuesday, March 4, 8:00 pm

| Sheet 1 | 1 | 2 | 3 | 4 | 5 | 6 | 7 | 8 | 9 | 10 | Final |
|---|---|---|---|---|---|---|---|---|---|---|---|
| (North Dakota) Abigayle Lindgren | 0 | 0 | 0 | 0 | 0 | 2 | X | X | X | X | 2 |
| (Minnesota) Cassandra Potter | 2 | 0 | 3 | 1 | 3 | 0 | X | X | X | X | 9 |

| Sheet 2 | 1 | 2 | 3 | 4 | 5 | 6 | 7 | 8 | 9 | 10 | Final |
|---|---|---|---|---|---|---|---|---|---|---|---|
| (Minnesota) Courtney George | 1 | 0 | 4 | 1 | 1 | 0 | 1 | 1 | X | X | 9 |
| (Minnesota) Amy Lou Anderson | 0 | 2 | 0 | 0 | 0 | 1 | 0 | 0 | X | X | 3 |

| Sheet 3 | 1 | 2 | 3 | 4 | 5 | 6 | 7 | 8 | 9 | 10 | Final |
|---|---|---|---|---|---|---|---|---|---|---|---|
| (Wisconsin) Nina Spatola | 3 | 0 | 2 | 0 | 2 | 1 | 1 | X | X | X | 9 |
| (Pennsylvania) Sarah Anderson | 0 | 1 | 0 | 1 | 0 | 0 | 0 | X | X | X | 2 |

| Sheet 4 | 1 | 2 | 3 | 4 | 5 | 6 | 7 | 8 | 9 | 10 | 11 | Final |
|---|---|---|---|---|---|---|---|---|---|---|---|---|
| (New York (state)) Caitlin Maroldo | 0 | 0 | 2 | 0 | 0 | 0 | 0 | 0 | 0 | 1 | 1 | 4 |
| (Washington (state)) Gabrielle Coleman | 2 | 0 | 0 | 1 | 0 | 0 | 0 | 0 | 0 | 0 | 0 | 3 |

| Sheet 5 | 1 | 2 | 3 | 4 | 5 | 6 | 7 | 8 | 9 | 10 | Final |
|---|---|---|---|---|---|---|---|---|---|---|---|
| (Minnesota) Alexandra Carlson | 1 | 0 | 0 | 1 | 0 | 1 | 1 | 1 | 0 | 1 | 6 |
| (Minnesota) Allison Pottinger | 0 | 2 | 0 | 0 | 2 | 0 | 0 | 0 | 1 | 0 | 5 |

=== Draw 8 ===
Wednesday, March 5, 12:00 pm

| Sheet 1 | 1 | 2 | 3 | 4 | 5 | 6 | 7 | 8 | 9 | 10 | 11 | Final |
|---|---|---|---|---|---|---|---|---|---|---|---|---|
| (Minnesota) Allison Pottinger | 0 | 0 | 0 | 3 | 0 | 3 | 0 | 0 | 1 | 1 | 1 | 9 |
| (Wisconsin) Nina Spatola | 1 | 1 | 2 | 0 | 3 | 0 | 0 | 1 | 0 | 0 | 0 | 8 |

| Sheet 2 | 1 | 2 | 3 | 4 | 5 | 6 | 7 | 8 | 9 | 10 | Final |
|---|---|---|---|---|---|---|---|---|---|---|---|
| (Minnesota) Alexandra Carlson | 0 | 2 | 0 | 0 | 1 | 0 | 3 | 0 | 1 | 1 | 8 |
| (Washington (state)) Gabrielle Coleman | 1 | 0 | 0 | 1 | 0 | 2 | 0 | 1 | 0 | 0 | 5 |

| Sheet 3 | 1 | 2 | 3 | 4 | 5 | 6 | 7 | 8 | 9 | 10 | Final |
|---|---|---|---|---|---|---|---|---|---|---|---|
| (Minnesota) Cassandra Potter | 0 | 1 | 0 | 1 | 0 | 1 | 0 | 2 | 0 | X | 5 |
| (New York (state)) Caitlin Maroldo | 0 | 0 | 0 | 0 | 2 | 0 | 0 | 0 | 1 | X | 3 |

| Sheet 4 | 1 | 2 | 3 | 4 | 5 | 6 | 7 | 8 | 9 | 10 | Final |
|---|---|---|---|---|---|---|---|---|---|---|---|
| (Pennsylvania) Sarah Anderson | 2 | 0 | 3 | 0 | 4 | 0 | X | X | X | X | 9 |
| (Minnesota) Amy Lou Anderson | 0 | 1 | 0 | 0 | 0 | 1 | X | X | X | X | 2 |

| Sheet 5 | 1 | 2 | 3 | 4 | 5 | 6 | 7 | 8 | 9 | 10 | Final |
|---|---|---|---|---|---|---|---|---|---|---|---|
| (Minnesota) Courtney George | 0 | 2 | 0 | 2 | 2 | 0 | 2 | 0 | 2 | X | 10 |
| (North Dakota) Abigayle Lindgren | 0 | 0 | 2 | 0 | 0 | 1 | 0 | 2 | 0 | X | 5 |

=== Draw 9 ===
Wednesday, March 5, 8:00 pm

| Sheet 1 | 1 | 2 | 3 | 4 | 5 | 6 | 7 | 8 | 9 | 10 | Final |
|---|---|---|---|---|---|---|---|---|---|---|---|
| (Washington (state)) Gabrielle Coleman | 2 | 0 | 0 | 1 | 0 | 1 | 0 | 1 | 1 | 0 | 6 |
| (Pennsylvania) Sarah Anderson | 0 | 0 | 2 | 0 | 3 | 0 | 1 | 0 | 0 | 1 | 7 |

| Sheet 2 | 1 | 2 | 3 | 4 | 5 | 6 | 7 | 8 | 9 | 10 | Final |
|---|---|---|---|---|---|---|---|---|---|---|---|
| (North Dakota) Abigayle Lindgren | 0 | 2 | 0 | 0 | 1 | 0 | 1 | 0 | 2 | 0 | 6 |
| (Wisconsin) Nina Spatola | 2 | 0 | 1 | 1 | 0 | 2 | 0 | 1 | 0 | 1 | 8 |

| Sheet 3 | 1 | 2 | 3 | 4 | 5 | 6 | 7 | 8 | 9 | 10 | Final |
|---|---|---|---|---|---|---|---|---|---|---|---|
| (Minnesota) Allison Pottinger | 2 | 0 | 1 | 1 | 1 | 0 | 0 | 0 | 0 | X | 5 |
| (Minnesota) Courtney George | 0 | 4 | 0 | 0 | 0 | 2 | 0 | 1 | 1 | X | 8 |

| Sheet 4 | 1 | 2 | 3 | 4 | 5 | 6 | 7 | 8 | 9 | 10 | Final |
|---|---|---|---|---|---|---|---|---|---|---|---|
| (Minnesota) Cassandra Potter | 2 | 2 | 3 | 0 | 1 | 0 | 0 | 1 | 0 | X | 9 |
| (Minnesota) Alexandra Carlson | 0 | 0 | 0 | 1 | 0 | 1 | 2 | 0 | 1 | X | 5 |

| Sheet 5 | 1 | 2 | 3 | 4 | 5 | 6 | 7 | 8 | 9 | 10 | Final |
|---|---|---|---|---|---|---|---|---|---|---|---|
| (Minnesota) Amy Lou Anderson | 0 | 0 | 1 | 1 | 1 | 0 | 1 | 0 | 0 | 1 | 5 |
| (New York (state)) Caitlin Maroldo | 1 | 0 | 0 | 0 | 0 | 1 | 0 | 1 | 1 | 0 | 4 |

== Tiebreaker ==
Thursday, March 6, 12:00 pm

| Team | 1 | 2 | 3 | 4 | 5 | 6 | 7 | 8 | 9 | 10 | Final |
|---|---|---|---|---|---|---|---|---|---|---|---|
| (Minnesota) Courtney George | 1 | 0 | 0 | 0 | 2 | 1 | 4 | 0 | 2 | X | 10 |
| (Minnesota) Alexandra Carlson | 0 | 3 | 1 | 1 | 0 | 0 | 0 | 2 | 0 | X | 7 |

Player percentages
| (Minnesota) Alexandra Carlson | | (Minnesota) Courtney George | |
|---|---|---|---|
| Sherri Schummer | 77% | Monica Walker | 91% |
| Emilia Juocys | 84% | Amanda McLean | 75% |
| Jamie Sinclair | 84% | Courtney George | 79% |
| Alexandra Carlson | 69% | Aileen Sormunen | 69% |
| Total | 78% | Total | 79% |

== Playoffs ==
Page playoff system
1 | (Minnesota) Allison Pottinger | 8
2 | (Minnesota) Cassandra Potter | 6
3 | (Wisconsin) Nina Spatola | 10
4 | (Minnesota) Courtney George | 4

Semifinal
2 | (Minnesota) Cassandra Potter | 4
3 | (Wisconsin) Nina Spatola | 9

Final
1 | (Minnesota) Allison Pottinger | 4
3 | (Wisconsin) Nina Spatola | 5

=== 1 vs. 2 ===
Thursday, March 6, 8:00 pm

| Team | 1 | 2 | 3 | 4 | 5 | 6 | 7 | 8 | 9 | 10 | Final |
|---|---|---|---|---|---|---|---|---|---|---|---|
| (Minnesota) Allison Pottinger | 3 | 0 | 1 | 1 | 1 | 0 | 1 | 0 | 0 | 1 | 8 |
| (Minnesota) Cassandra Potter | 0 | 1 | 0 | 0 | 0 | 1 | 0 | 2 | 2 | 0 | 6 |

Player percentages
| (Minnesota) Allison Pottinger | | (Minnesota) Cassandra Potter | |
|---|---|---|---|
| Tabitha Peterson | 75% | Stephanie Sambor | 91% |
| Natalie Nicholson | 96% | Jaclyn Lemke | 76% |
| Nicole Joraanstad | 71% | Jamie Haskell | 82% |
| Allison Pottinger | 72% | Cassandra Potter | 56% |
| Total | 79% | Total | 76% |

=== 3 vs. 4 ===
Thursday, March 6, 8:00 pm

| Team | 1 | 2 | 3 | 4 | 5 | 6 | 7 | 8 | 9 | 10 | Final |
|---|---|---|---|---|---|---|---|---|---|---|---|
| (Wisconsin) Nina Spatola | 0 | 0 | 2 | 1 | 0 | 2 | 3 | 0 | 2 | X | 10 |
| (Minnesota) Courtney George | 0 | 0 | 0 | 0 | 1 | 0 | 0 | 3 | 0 | X | 4 |

Player percentages
| (Wisconsin) Nina Spatola | | (Minnesota) Courtney George | |
|---|---|---|---|
| Sophie Brorson | 62% | Monica Walker | 93% |
| Tara Peterson | 85% | Amanda McLean | 77% |
| Becca Hamilton | 94% | Courtney George | 69% |
| Nina Spatola | 81% | Aileen Sormunen | 57% |
| Total | 81% | Total | 74% |

=== Semifinal ===
Friday, March 7, 4:00 pm

| Team | 1 | 2 | 3 | 4 | 5 | 6 | 7 | 8 | 9 | 10 | Final |
|---|---|---|---|---|---|---|---|---|---|---|---|
| (Minnesota) Cassandra Potter | 0 | 1 | 0 | 1 | 0 | 1 | 0 | 1 | 0 | X | 4 |
| (Wisconsin) Nina Spatola | 2 | 0 | 1 | 0 | 1 | 0 | 2 | 0 | 3 | X | 9 |

Player percentages
| (Minnesota) Cassandra Potter | | (Wisconsin) Nina Spatola | |
|---|---|---|---|
| Stephanie Sambor | 80% | Sophie Brorson | 82% |
| Jaclyn Lemke | 75% | Tara Peterson | 78% |
| Jamie Haskell | 67% | Becca Hamilton | 62% |
| Cassandra Potter | 57% | Nina Spatola | 76% |
| Total | 70% | Total | 74% |

=== Final ===
Saturday, March 8, 10:00 am

| Team | 1 | 2 | 3 | 4 | 5 | 6 | 7 | 8 | 9 | 10 | Final |
|---|---|---|---|---|---|---|---|---|---|---|---|
| (Minnesota) Allison Pottinger | 0 | 0 | 1 | 0 | 0 | 1 | 1 | 0 | 1 | 0 | 4 |
| (Wisconsin) Nina Spatola | 0 | 0 | 0 | 1 | 1 | 0 | 0 | 2 | 0 | 1 | 5 |

Player percentages
| (Minnesota) Allison Pottinger | | (Wisconsin) Nina Spatola | |
|---|---|---|---|
| Tabitha Peterson | 84% | Sophie Brorson | 87% |
| Natalie Nicholson | 88% | Tara Peterson | 87% |
| Nicole Joraanstad | 89% | Becca Hamilton | 82% |
| Allison Pottinger | 92% | Nina Spatola | 94% |
| Total | 88% | Total | 87% |
