= Courtney George =

American curler (born 1986)

- Curler
- Born: June 24, 1986 (age 40); Duluth, Minnesota

Team
- Curling club: St. Paul CC, St. Paul
- Skip: Courtney George
- Fourth: Aileen Geving
- Second: Lexi Daly
- Lead: Sara Olson

Curling career
- Member Association: United States
- World Championship: 1 (2005)
- Olympic: 1 (2006)
Medal record
Women's curling
Representing United States
World Curling Championships
Silver medal – second place	2005 Paisley	Team
United States Women's Curling Championship
Silver medal – second place	2013 Green Bay	Team
Bronze medal – third place	2008 Hibbing	Team
Bronze medal – third place	2010 Kalamazoo	Team
Bronze medal – third place	2012 Philadelphia	Team
World Junior Curling Championships
Gold medal – first place	2002 Kelowna	Team
Silver medal – second place	2003 Flims	Team
United States Olympic Curling Trials
Bronze medal – third place	2009 Broomfield	Team
Bronze medal – third place	2013 Fargo	Team

Courtney Benson (born June 24, 1986; née George) is an American curler from Duluth, Minnesota.

== Career ==
George began curling in 1998. She won two medals at the World Junior Curling Championships as alternate for Cassandra Johnson, gold in 2002 and silver in 2003. She was also a national junior champion in 2004 and 2007.

George participated in the 2005 United States Olympic Curling Trials, playing as third for skip Aileen Sormunen, and qualified for the playoffs in fourth place, but lost their page playoffs game against Patti Lank. George was asked to serve as the alternate for the United States women's team skipped by Cassandra Johnson. Throughout the competition when it was clear the United States would not win their matches Courtney George was regularly brought in to play an end which alternates typically do not get to do at major competitions.

George played as the vice-skip on the team skipped by Amy Wright, finishing third at the 2010 United States Olympic Curling Trials.

George played as third for Sormunen at the 2011 and 2012 United States Women's Curling Championships, finishing sixth and fourth, respectively. George and Sormunen switched positions the next year, and finished second at the 2013 United States Women's Curling Championship. George and her team were selected to participate at the 2014 United States Olympic Curling Trials by the national High Performance Program committee.

== Personal life ==
George has a degree in the psychology of behavioral science from the University of St. Thomas. She is currently a personal care assistant, and is finishing a master's degree in occupational therapy.

George's brother Tyler is also a successful curler, winning the gold medal at the 2018 Winter Olympics.

She was married and change surname to Benson in the middle of 2023.

== Teams ==
=== Women's ===
Season	Skip	Third	Second	Lead	Alternate	Coach	Events
2001–02	Aileen Sormunen	Courtney George	Amanda Jensen	Amanda McLean		CJ Johnson	2001 USJCC (bronze)
2001–02	Aileen Sormunen	Courtney George	Amanda Jensen	Amanda McLean		CJ Johnson	2002 USJCC (silver)
2001–02	Cassandra Johnson	Jamie Johnson	Katie Beck	Maureen Brunt	Courtney George	Jim Dexter	2002 WJCC (gold)
2002–03	Aileen Sormunen	Courtney George	Amanda Jensen	Amanda McLean		CJ Johnson	2003 USJCC (silver)
2002–03	Cassandra Johnson	Katherine Beck	Rebecca Dobie	Maureen Brunt	Courtney George	Neil Doese	2003 WJCC (silver)
2003–04	Aileen Sormunen	Courtney George	Amanda Jensen	Amanda McLean	Jessica Schultz (WJCC)	CJ Johnson	2004 USJCC (gold); 2004 WJCC (4th)
2004–05	Aileen Sormunen	Courtney George	Amanda Jensen	Amanda McLean		CJ Johnson	2005 USJCC (5th); 2005 USWCC/USOCT (4th)
2004–05	Cassandra Johnson	Jamie Johnson	Jessica Schultz	Maureen Brunt	Courtney George	Neil Doese	2005 WWCC (silver)
2005–06	Jessica Schultz	Jamie Johnson	Courtney George	Maureen Brunt	Cassie Johnson	Neil Doese	2006 US World Trials (4th)
2005–06	Cassandra Johnson	Jamie Johnson	Jessica Schultz	Maureen Brunt	Courtney George	Neil Doese	2006 OG (8th)
2006–07	Aileen Sormunen	Courtney George	Molly Bonner	Jordan Moulton	Monica Walker (WJCC)	Bob Fenson	2007 USJCC (gold); 2007 WJCC (4th)
2007–08	Aileen Sormunen	Courtney George	Molly Bonner	Jordan Moulton		Bob Fenson	2008 USWCC (bronze)
2008–09	Amy Wright	Courtney George	Jordan Moulton	Patti Luke	Amanda McLean		2009 USWCC/USOCT (bronze)
2009–10	Amy Wright	Courtney George	Jordan Moulton	Patti Luke	Amanda McLean		2010 USWCC (bronze)
2010–11	Aileen Sormunen	Courtney George	Amanda McLean	Miranda Solem			2011 USWCC (5th)
2011–12	Aileen Sormunen	Courtney George	Amanda McLean	Miranda Solem			2012 USWCC (bronze)
2012–13	Courtney George	Aileen Sormunen	Amanda McLean	Julie Lilla	Amy Wright		2013 USWCC (silver)
2013–14	Courtney George	Aileen Sormunen	Amanda McLean	Monica Walker	Jordan Moulton		2013 USOCT (4th); 2014 USWCC (4th)
2014–15	Debbie McCormick	Courtney George	Emilia Juocys	Stephanie Senneker			2015 USWCC (7th)
2015–16	Courtney George	Miranda Solem	Amy Lou Anderson	Stephanie Senneker			
2016–17	Jessica Schultz	Courtney George	Jordan Moulton	Stephanie Senneker			2017 USWCC (6th)
2017–18	Jessica Schultz	Courtney George	Jordan Moulton	Stephanie Senneker			
2018–19	Allison Pottinger	Courtney George	Jordan Moulton	Regan Birr			
2019–20	Cassandra Potter	Courtney George	Jackie Lemke	Jordan Moulton	Sophie Bader		2020 USWCC (4th)

=== Mixed ===
Season	Skip	Third	Second	Lead	Events
2018–19	Tyler George	Courtney George	Derek Benson	Jordan Moulton	2019 USMxCC (8th)

=== Mixed doubles ===
Season	Female	Male	Events
2010–11	Courtney George	Tyler George	2011 USMDCC (bronze)
2014–15	Courtney George	Tyler George	2015 USMDCC (DNQ)
2015–16	Courtney George	Tyler George	US World Trials (4th)
2016–17	Courtney George	Tyler George	2017 USMDCC (DNQ)
2017–18	Courtney George	Tyler George	
