= Maureen Brunt =

Australian economist and academic (1928–2019)

Maureen Brunt AO (26 December 1928 – 30 January 2019) was an Australian economist and academic who specialised in the field of competition law. She was Emeritus professor of Economics at Monash University.

== Early life and education ==
Brunt received a degree in economics from the University of Melbourne in 1951 and a Doctor of Philosophy in industrial organization from Harvard University in 1964.

== Career ==
Brunt was a lecturer in economics at the University of Melbourne, the University of Adelaide, and Harvard University in the 1960s. She returned to Australia in 1996 to become Professor of Economics at Monash University, becoming the first woman to hold a Chair of Economics in Australia. She is known for her "innovative analysis of the interaction of ... law and economics". She was described by the Privy Council as "a distinguished Australian economist."

Brunt was a member and then Chair of the Victorian Government Consumer Affairs Council, serving for nearly ten years. During her tenure as chair, the council delivered its inquiry into deceptive trade practices law in Victoria.

Brunt was a foundation member of the Australian Trade Practices Tribunal. She was a lay member of the High Court of New Zealand for competition cases from 1990 until 2000.

She died on 30 January 2019, aged 90.

== Awards and honours ==
Brunt was named an officer of the Order of Australia in the Australia Day Honours in 1992 for "services to the Trade Practices Tribunal and to education." In 1995, she was awarded an honorary Doctor of Laws from Monash University. She was elected a distinguished fellow of the Economics Society of Australia in 2006.

== Selected publications ==
=== Books ===
- Karmel, PH; Brunt, Maureen (1962). The Structure of the Australian Economy. Melbourne: F W Cheshire.
- Brunt, Maureen (2003). Economic Essays on Australian and New Zealand Competition Law. The Hague: Kluwer Law International. ISBN 9789041119919.

=== Chapters ===
- Brunt, Maureen (1976). "Lawyers and Competition Policy". In D Hambly; J Goldring (eds.). Australian Lawyers and Social Change. Sydney: The Law Book Co. pp. 266–297.
- Brunt, Maureen (1993). "Australian and New Zealand Competition Law and Policy". In Barry Hawk (ed.). Fordham Corporate Law Institute: International Antitrust Law and Policy. New York: Juris Publishing. pp. 131–193.
- Brunt, Maureen (1999). "Antitrust in the Courts: The Role of Economics and of Economists". In Barry Hawk (ed.). 1998 Fordham Corporate Law Institute: International Antitrust Law and Policy. New York: Juris Publishing. pp. 357–367.

=== Journal articles ===
- Brunt, Maureen (1965). "Legislation in Search of an Objective". The Economic Record. 41 (95): 357–386. doi:10.1111/j.1475-4932.1965.tb03056.x.
- Brunt, Maureen; Baxt, Robert (1974). "The Murphy Trade Practices Bill: Admirable Objectives, Inadequate Means". Australian Business Law Review. 2: 3–79.
- Brunt, Maureen; Baxt, Robert (1974). "A Guide to the Trade Practices Act 1974". Australian Economic Review. 4th Quarter: 5–22.
- Brunt, Maureen (1986). "The Use of Economic Evidence in Antitrust Litigation: Australia". Australian Business Law Review. 14: 261–308.
- Brunt, Maureen (1990). "Market Definition Issues in Australian and New Zealand Trade Practices Litigation" (PDF). Australian Business Law Review. 18: 86–128.
- Brunt, Maureen (1990). "The Role of Private Actions in Australian Restrictive Practices Enforcement". Melbourne University Law Review. 17: 582–613.
- Brunt, Maureen (1994). "The Australian Antitrust Law after 20 Years — a Stocktake". The Australian Trade Practices Act 1974. Studies in Industrial Organization. Vol. 5. pp. 483–526. doi:10.1007/978-94-015-8324-4_3. ISBN 978-90-481-4491-4. S2CID 153938491.
- Brunt, Maureen (1995). "Issues from the Davids-QIW Merger Case – A Comment". Competition and Consumer Law Journal. 3: 16–25.
