= Alexandra Agre =

American curler (born 1988)

- Curler
- Other names: Alex Agre
- Born: Alexandra Carlson; December 14, 1988 (age 37); St. Paul, Minnesota, U.S.

Team
- Curling club: St. Paul Curling Club
- Mixed doubles partner: Derrick McLean

Curling career
- World Championship: 1 (2018)
- Grand Slam victories: 1 (2018 Players' Championship)
Medal record
Curling
Representing United States
World Junior Curling Championships
Bronze medal – third place	2010 Flims
Representing Minnesota
U.S. Women's Curling Championship
Gold medal – first place	2015 Kalamazoo
Gold medal – first place	2017 Everett
Gold medal – first place	2018 Fargo
United States Olympic Curling Trials
Silver medal – second place	2017 Omaha

Alexandra "Alex" Agre (born December 14, 1988, as Alexandra Carlson) is an American curler.

== Curling career ==
=== Junior ===
Agre is a two-time United States Junior Curling Champion with teammates Tabitha Peterson, Tara Peterson and Sophie Brorson, winning in 2009 and 2010. Representing the United States, Agre skipped her team at the 2009 World Junior Curling Championships, finishing in fifth place. At the 2010 World Junior Curling Championships, she led her team to a bronze medal.

=== Women's ===
In 2014, Agre joined the Erika Brown rink for one season, playing third. The team would go on to win the 2015 United States Women's Curling Championship. The next season, Agre returned to skipping a team before joining the Jamie Sinclair rink in 2016 as her third. In their first season together, they would win the 2017 United States Women's Curling Championship and would play in the 2017 Continental Cup of Curling. The team lost in the finals of the 2017 United States Olympic Curling Trials, missing out on the chance to play in the Olympics. Later that season they would win the 2018 United States Women's Curling Championship and would represent the United States at the 2018 Ford World Women's Curling Championship, where they finished fourth. The Sinclair rink made history at the 2018 Players' Championship when they became the first American rink to win a Grand Slam event. To finish the season, they had a quarterfinal finish at the 2018 Humpty's Champions Cup. The following season, Agre left the Sinclair rink as she was preparing to give birth.

== Personal life ==
Agre works as a medical device quality consultant. She is a type 1 diabetic. She attended Marquette University. She has one daughter, Abigail.

== Teams ==
Season	Skip	Third	Second	Lead	Alternate	Coach	Events
2005–06	Alex Carlson	Tabitha Peterson	Tara Peterson	Sophie Brorson			2006 USJCC (SF)
2006–07	Alex Carlson	Tabitha Peterson	Tara Peterson	Sophie Brorson			2007 USWCC (4th)
2007–08	Alex Carlson	Tabitha Peterson	Tara Peterson	Sophie Brorson			2008 USJCC (silver)
2008–09	Alex Carlson	Tabitha Peterson	Tara Peterson	Sophie Brorson	Molly Bonner	Howard Restall	2009 USJCC (gold); 2009 WJCC (5th)
2009–10	Alex Carlson	Tabitha Peterson	Tara Peterson	Sophie Brorson	Miranda Solem	Howard Restall	2010 USJCC (gold); 2010 WJCC (bronze)
2011–12	Alex Carlson	Monica Walker	Kendall Moulton	Jordan Moulton			2012 USWCC (4th)
2012–13	Alex Carlson	Monica Walker	Kendall Behm	Jordan Moulton			2013 USWCC (4th)
2013–14	Alex Carlson	Jamie Sinclair	Emilia Juocys	Sherri Schummer			2014 USWCC (5th)
2014–15	Erika Brown	Alex Carlson	Becca Funk	Kendall Behm			2015 USWCC (gold)
2015–16	Alex Carlson	Rebecca Funk	Jordan Moulton	Kendall Behm			
2016–17	Jamie Sinclair	Alex Carlson	Vicky Persinger	Monica Walker			2017 USWCC (gold)
2017–18	Jamie Sinclair	Alex Carlson	Vicky Persinger	Monica Walker	Jenna Martin (WWCC)	Scott Baird	2017 USOCT (silver); 2018 USWCC (gold); 2018 WWCC (4th)
