= Cassandra Potter =

American curler

- Curler
- Born: Cassandra Lynn Johnson; October 30, 1981 (age 45); Bemidji, Minnesota

Team
- Skip: Cassandra Potter
- Third: Jackie Lemke
- Second: Sophie Bader
- Lead: Steph Bohan

Curling career
- World Championship: 1 (2005)
- Olympic: 1 (2006)
Medal record
Curling
Representing United States
World Curling Championships
Silver medal – second place	2005 Paisley	Team
World Junior Curling Championships
Gold medal – first place	2002 Kelowna
Silver medal – second place	2003 Flims
United States Women's Curling Championship
Gold medal – first place	2005 Madison
Silver medal – second place	2012 Philadelphia
Bronze medal – third place	2011 Fargo
Bronze medal – third place	2014 Philadelphia
Bronze medal – third place	2017 Everett
United States Olympic Curling Trials
Gold medal – first place	2005 Madison	Team
Bronze medal – third place	2001 Ogden	Team

Cassandra "Cassie" Potter (née Johnson) (born October 30, 1981) is an American curler best known for skipping the United States Women's Curling Team at the 2006 Winter Olympics and the 2005 Women's World Curling Championships. Her sister is fellow curler and long-time teammate Jamie Haskell.

== Career ==
=== Early career ===
Potter was born in Bemidji, Minnesota, a curling hotbed. She began playing the game at age 5, and honed the strategic elements of her game by watching Canadian curling competitions on television. After playing as an alternate at the 1998 World Junior Curling Championships for the 5th-place U.S. team skipped (captained) by Hope Schmitt, Cassandra returned to the Junior Championships in 2002, this time as the skip of the team; she and her United States squad went on to capture the gold medal with a win over Matilda Mattsson of Sweden. In 2003, Cassie returned once again to the World Junior Championships, and once again made it to the final. However, this time she lost, with Marliese Miller of Canada winning the gold.

=== 2005–present ===
In 2005, Johnson competed in the U.S. 2006 Olympic Trials/National Championships, which she won, thus gaining the right to represent the USA at both the 2006 Winter Olympics and the 2005 World Women's Curling Championship. At the 2005 World Championships, she again won a silver medal, this time losing to Anette Norberg's Swedish rink in the final. For her efforts, Cassie was named USA Curling's Female Athlete of the Year in 2005. Cassie made a difficult, pressure-packed shot in the 11th end of the final match of the 2006 Olympic Trials to qualify for the Winter Olympics in Turin.

Johnson's Olympics experience was a difficult one: she and her United States team lost five of their first six matches en route to a 2–7 record in the round-robin stage of the tournament. Immediately after the Olympics, a re-arrangement occurred on the team's roster for the 2006 U.S. World Team Trials. Johnson became the team's alternate, while Jessica Schultz skipped the team. At the trials, the team finished in fourth place, losing the 3–4 page game to Margie Smith. The team went back to their Olympic lineup for later events, however.

Upon their semifinal win at the 2012 United States Women's Curling Championship, Potter and her team were qualified to participate at the 2013 United States Olympic Curling Trials.

== Personal life ==
Potter became engaged the week after the 2006 Winter Olympics ended, and was married in 2007. She graduated from Bemidji State University with a degree in graphic design. She enjoys fishing and listening to music when she is not curling, and is a big fan of the Minnesota Twins. When she was 12, Potter was diagnosed with a heart murmur due to a congenital heart defect in her tricuspid valve, but the condition is not severe and does not interfere with her daily life.

Potter's biography page at NBC's Winter Olympics website was among the most-viewed of any U.S. athlete, and she received countless marriage proposals from men all over the world at the U.S. Women's Curling Team's official blog, which crashed early in the Games after receiving 12.9 million hits in one day.

Potter comes from a curling family: she played together with older sister Jamie for many years, her parents Liz and Tim have won the U.S. Mixed Curling Championships four times, and her grandparents and great-grandparents were curlers as well. Her father Tim is also a two-time Men's National Champion and 1993 World bronze medalist.

== Teams ==
=== Women's ===
Season	Skip	Third	Second	Lead	Alternate	Coach	Events
1995–96	Stacey Liapis	Jamie Johnson	Cassandra Johnson	Tina Kelly			1996 USJCC (SF)
1997–98	Cassandra Johnson	Jamie Johnson	Tina Kelly	Kristy Matson			1998 USJCC (silver)
1997–98	Hope Schmitt	Nikki Baird	Katlyn Schmitt	Teresa Bahr	Cassandra Johnson		1998 WJCC (5th)
1998–99	Cassandra Johnson	Jamie Johnson	Tina Kelly	Kristy Matson		Liz Johnson	1999 USJCC (SF)
1999–00	Cassandra Johnson	Jamie Johnson	Tina Kelly	Kristy Matson		Liz Johnson	2000 USJCC (SF)
2000–01	Cassandra Johnson	Jamie Johnson	Tina Kelly	Kristy Matson		Jim Dexter	2001 USJCC (silver)
2001–02	Cassandra Johnson	Jamie Johnson	Hope Schmitt	Teresa Bahr Oberstein			2001 USOCT (bronze); 2002 USWCC (SF)
2001–02	Cassandra Johnson	Jamie Johnson	Katie Beck	Maureen Brunt	Courtney George (WJCC)	Jim Dexter	2002 USJCC (gold); 2002 WJCC (gold)
2002–03	Cassandra Johnson	Katie Beck	Rebecca Dobie	Maureen Brunt	Courtney George (WJCC)	Jamie Johnson (USJCC); Neil Doese (WJCC)	2003 USJCC (gold); 2003 WJCC (silver)
2002–03	Cassandra Johnson	Jamie Johnson	Katie Beck	Maureen Brunt			2003 USWCC (SF)
2003–04	Cassandra Johnson	Jamie Johnson	Katie Beck	Maureen Brunt		Neil Doese	2004 USWCC (SF)
2004–05	Cassandra Johnson	Jamie Johnson	Jessica Schultz	Maureen Brunt	Courtney George (WWCC)	Neil Doese (WWCC)	2005 USWCC/USOCT (gold); 2005 WWCC (silver)
2005–06	Cassandra Johnson	Jamie Johnson	Jessica Schultz	Maureen Brunt	Courtney George	Neil Doese	2006 OG (8th)
2006–07	Cassandra Johnson	Jamie Haskell	Jessica Schultz	Maureen Brunt			2007 USWCC (silver)
2007–08	Cassandra Potter	Jamie Haskell	Jessica Schultz	Maureen Brunt	Jackie Lemke	Jim Dexter	2008 USWCC (4th)
2008–09	Cassandra Potter	Jamie Haskell	Laura Roessler	Jackie Lemke			2009 USWCC/USOCT (6th)
2010–11	Cassandra Potter	Jamie Haskell	Maureen Stolt	Stephanie Sambor			2011 USWCC (bronze)
2011–12	Cassandra Potter	Jamie Haskell	Jackie Lemke	Stephanie Sambor			2012 USWCC (silver)
2013–14	Cassandra Potter	Jamie Haskell	Jackie Lemke	Stephanie Sambor			2013 USOCT (3rd); 2014 USWCC (bronze)
2016–17	Cassandra Potter	Jackie Lemke	Sophie Bader	Stephanie Bohan			2017 USWCC (bronze)
2019–20	Cassandra Potter	Courtney George	Jackie Lemke	Jordan Moulton	Sophie Bader		2020 USWCC (4th)

=== Mixed doubles ===
Season	Female	Male	Events
2008–09	Cassandra Potter	Corrie Potter	2009 USMDCC (DNQ)

== Awards ==
- Frances Brodie Award: 2005
- USA Curling Female Athlete of the Year: 2005
- USA Curling Team of the Year: 2005, 2002
- WJCC All-Star Skip: 2002
- Winner, Curtis Cup (team sportsmanship award) at U.S. Junior Nationals in 1999 and 2000
