= 2012 United States Men's Curling Championship – Qualification =

Qualification for the 2012 United States Men's Curling Championship took place in two rounds in January at various locations throughout the nation. The number of entrants to the national championships was cut down to eleven teams through a playdown system of regional qualifiers and a challenge round.

== Qualification system ==
As with last year, teams qualified for the men's nationals either by qualifying automatically as one of the top two teams on the World Curling Tour Order of Merit, by qualifying through a regional qualifier, or by qualifying through the challenge round. The two teams that qualified automatically to the championships were chosen based on the Order of Merit upon the conclusion of the Curl Mesabi Cash Spiel. This year, the teams were those skipped by Tyler George and Craig Brown. The other eight spots in the nationals were awarded as follows: five were awarded to the top finishers in the regional qualifiers, and three were awarded to the top finishers in the challenge round.

The qualification rounds were all held with the double knockout provision in place. The double knockout provision states that a team is eliminated from qualifying for the nationals if the team has at least two losses in their win-loss record. If there are teams with less than two losses, they will play each other until the number of teams still able to qualify matches the number of qualification spots available.

=== Regional qualifiers ===
The qualifiers were held from January 4 to 8 in Green Bay, Wisconsin, Seattle, Washington, Grand Forks, North Dakota, and Laurel, Maryland, given that at least five teams sign up at each qualifier. If there were less than five teams signed up at any site, the qualifier at that site would have been cancelled, and teams could either be moved to an alternate site or cancel their registration. Qualifiers with more than ten teams would have been held in a knockout format, and qualifiers with less than ten teams would have been held in a round robin format. Each qualifier site was awarded one or more qualification spots to the nationals based on the strength of field at each qualifier site. The strength of field of each team was calculated using Order of Merit points, past participation in national championships and world championships, and final ranks at past national championships. In total, five teams qualified from the four regional qualifiers, and eight teams moved from the qualifiers to the challenge round. This year, the teams that qualified from the regional qualifiers were those skipped by Heath McCormick, Wes Johnson, John Shuster, Owen Sampson, and Blake Morton.

=== Challenge round ===
The top eight finishers from the regional qualifiers that did not qualify for the nationals were invited to play in the challenge round, which were held from January 19 to 22 in Eau Claire, Wisconsin. Two other teams that were not qualified to either the nationals or the challenge round were then invited based on their Order of Merit points. If a team qualifying to the challenge round through a regional qualifier declined its invitation, the spot would have been filled based on the Order of Merit. A maximum of ten teams could play at the challenge round. The number of teams invited from each qualifier were determined using the strength of field system. The challenge round was played in a round robin format. At the conclusion of the round robin, the top three teams were chosen to qualify to the nationals. This year, those teams were those skipped by Eric Fenson, Mike Farbelow, and Todd Birr.

== Regional qualifiers ==
All four qualifiers were held at their respective locations from January 4 to 8. A total of 39 teams registered to participate in the regional qualifiers. Of these teams, three teams qualified directly to the nationals without participation in the qualifying rounds. The rink skipped by Pete Fenson did not have to participate in the qualifiers due to their participation on behalf of the United States at the 2012 USA-Brazil Challenge. Two teams, skipped by Tyler George and Craig Brown, qualified directly to the nationals by virtue of their Order of Merit rankings. If Fenson was one of the top two ranked Order of Merit teams, there would only have been one other team qualifying directly to the nationals via Order of Merit, but Fenson was not one of the top two ranked Order of Merit teams, so the top two ranked teams qualified directly to the nationals.

=== Participating teams ===
The following is a list of all teams registered to participate in the regional qualifiers. The teams skipped by Pete Fenson, Craig Brown, and Tyler George qualified automatically, and as such did not need to participate in the qualifying rounds.

Key
Teams Directly to Nationals
Teams to challenge round

Skip	Third	Second	Lead	Alternate	Locale
Laurel Qualifier
Joe Calabrese	Michael Mengel	Jason Sethi	Brian Anderson		(New York (state)) Fairport, New York
Brandon Corbett	Sean Murray	Mark Mooney	Mike Graziano		(New York (state)) Rochester, New York
Brian Damon	Michael Stefanik	Peter Drechsler	Arthur Merkley		(New York (state)) Schenectady, New York
Brian Galebach	Richard Ashford	Brandon Kiraly	Eric Clawson		Columbia, Maryland
Matt Holtwick	Benjamin Levy	Nik Geller	Philip Wolf		Elyria, Ohio
Heath McCormick	William Stopera	Martin Sather	Dean Gemmell		(New York (state)) New York, New York
Clark Raven	Jeff Pulli	Jason Scott	Christopher Lopez		(New York (state)) Rochester, New York
Derek Surka	Alex Leichter	Bryan Fink	Jared Wydysh		New Haven, Connecticut
Richard Van Cuyck	Scott Parmelee	Joshua Ozarowsky	Tristan Mondy	Aaron Crawley	(New York (state)) Fairport, New York
Seattle Qualifier
Sean Beighton	Andrew Ernst	Samuel Galey	MacAllan Guy		(Washington (state)) Seattle, Washington
Benjamin Guzman	Doug Schaak	Charles Taggart	Christopher Rimple		(Washington (state)) Seattle, Washington
Wes Johnson	Brady Clark	Darren Lehto	Steve Lundeen		(Washington (state)) Seattle, Washington
Doug Kauffman	Paul Lyttle	Liam Barksdale	John Rasmussen		(Washington (state)) Seattle, Washington
Christopher Pleasants	Zachary Radmer	Jon Chartrand	Richard Burmeister		(Washington (state)) Seattle, Washington
Grand Forks Qualifier
Ryan Berg	Mitch Oakland	Al Gulseth	Jordan Brown		West Fargo, North Dakota
Todd Birr	Greg Romaniuk	Doug Pottinger	Thomas O'Connor	Kevin Birr	Mankato, Minnesota
Scott Brown	Evan Workin	Braden Burckhard	Ryan Westby		Fargo, North Dakota
~~Joey Erjavec~~	~~Steven Gebauer~~	~~Daniel Ruehl~~	~~Marty Jurek~~	~~Noah Johnson~~	
Eric Fenson	Trevor Andrews	Quentin Way	Mark Lazar		Bemidji, Minnesota
Pete Fenson	Shawn Rojeski	Joe Polo	Ryan Brunt		Bemidji, Minnesota
Tyler George	Christopher Plys	Rich Ruohonen	Aanders Brorson		Duluth, Minnesota
Mark Haluptzok	John Israelson	Randy Hovet	Jon Chandler		Bemidji, Minnesota
Kevin Kakela	Kurt Disher	Kyle Kakela	Pete Annis		Rolla, North Dakota
Adam Kitchens	Brandon Myhre	Alex Kitchens	Nathan Myhre		Devils Lake, North Dakota
Bill Morehouse	Cameron Delaney	Joel Cooper (Note: Cooper is now known as JayCee due to gender transition.)	Ash Nelson		(New York (state)) Utica, New York
Owen Sampson	Ned Sampson	Tucker Smith	Kyle Young		Edmore, North Dakota
John Shuster	Zach Jacobson	Jared Zezel	John Landsteiner		Duluth, Minnesota
Jason Smith	Jeffrey Isaacson	Aaron Wald	Connor McLeod		Fort Myers, Florida
Matt Stevens	Cody Stevens	Robert Liapis	Jeff Breyen		Bemidji, Minnesota
Peter Stolt	Jerod Roland	Brad Caldwell	Erik Ordway		St. Paul, Minnesota
Green Bay Qualifier
~~Josh Bahr~~	~~Chris Bond~~	~~John Muller~~	~~Atticus Wallace~~		Bemidji, Minnesota
Ryan Lemke (fourth)	John Benton (skip)	John Lilla	Steve Day		Medford, Wisconsin
Joey Bonfoey	Joel Dietz	Matt Carlson	Ted Trolson		Duluth, Minnesota
Craig Brown	Kroy Nernberger	Matt Hamilton	Derrick Casper		Madison, Wisconsin
Mike Farbelow	Kevin Deeren	Kraig Deeren	Tim Solin		Minneapolis, Minnesota
Blake Morton	Marcus Fonger	Tommy Juszczyk	Calvin Weber		McFarland, Wisconsin
Paul Pustovar	Nicholas Myers	Andrew Jukich	Jeff Puleo	Harold Rutan	Hibbing, Minnesota
Matt Rudig	Dan Wiza	Jeff Kuemmel	Michael Krajewski		Madison, Wisconsin
~~Greg Wilson~~	~~David Brown~~	~~Jeremy Roe~~	~~Richard Maskel~~		Vernon Hills, Illinois

=== Laurel qualifier ===
The Laurel qualifier was held at the Potomac Curling Club in Laurel, Maryland. It was held in a round robin format. At the conclusion of the round robin, the top team qualified directly to the Nationals, and the second-ranked team qualified to the challenge round. The team skipped by Heath McCormick qualified directly to the Nationals, and the team skipped by Derek Surka qualified to the challenge round.

==== Standings ====
Final round-robin standings

Skip	W	L
(New York (state)) Heath McCormick	8	0
(New York (state)) Brandon Corbett	5	3
(New York (state)) Brian Damon	5	3
(Connecticut) Derek Surka	5	3
(New York (state)) Joe Calabrese	4	4
(Maryland) Brian Galebach	3	4
(New York (state)) Clark Raven	2	4
(Ohio) Matt Holtwick	1	6
(New York (state)) Richard Van Cuyck	1	7

Standings after tiebreakers

Skip	W	L
(New York (state)) Heath McCormick	8	0
(Connecticut) Derek Surka	7	3
(New York (state)) Brandon Corbett	5	4
(New York (state)) Brian Damon	5	4
(New York (state)) Joe Calabrese	4	4
(Maryland) Brian Galebach	3	4
(New York (state)) Clark Raven	2	4
(Ohio) Matt Holtwick	1	6
(New York (state)) Richard Van Cuyck	1	7

==== Round-robin results ====
===== Draw 1 =====
Thursday, January 5, 2:00 pm

Sheet 1	1	2	3	4	5	6	7	8	9	10	Final
(Maryland) Brian Galebach	0	0	0	0	2	1	0	1	0	X	4
(New York (state)) Joe Calabrese 🔨	3	1	1	2	0	0	2	0	5	X	14

Sheet 2	1	2	3	4	5	6	7	8	9	10	Final
(New York (state)) Heath McCormick	3	2	1	1	0	3	X	X	X	X	10
(New York (state)) Richard Van Cuyck 🔨	0	0	0	0	2	0	X	X	X	X	2

Sheet 3	1	2	3	4	5	6	7	8	9	10	Final
(New York (state)) Clark Raven 🔨	0	1	0	1	0	2	0	1	0	0	5
(Connecticut) Derek Surka	0	0	1	0	2	0	0	0	2	1	6

Sheet 4	1	2	3	4	5	6	7	8	9	10	Final
(Ohio) Matt Holtwick 🔨	0	1	1	0	0	1	2	0	0	X	5
(New York (state)) Brandon Corbett	1	0	0	1	2	0	0	4	1	X	9

===== Draw 2 =====
Thursday, January 5, 7:00 pm

Sheet 1	1	2	3	4	5	6	7	8	9	10	Final
(New York (state)) Brandon Corbett 🔨	0	1	0	1	0	0	0	1	0	X	3
(New York (state)) Clark Raven	0	0	1	0	2	2	0	0	1	X	6

Sheet 2	1	2	3	4	5	6	7	8	9	10	11	Final
(Maryland) Brian Galebach	2	0	4	0	1	0	3	0	0	0	1	11
(Ohio) Matt Holtwick 🔨	0	4	0	1	0	1	0	1	1	2	0	10

Sheet 3	1	2	3	4	5	6	7	8	9	10	Final
(New York (state)) Heath McCormick 🔨	0	1	0	3	2	0	6	X	X	X	12
(New York (state)) Brian Damon	2	0	1	0	0	1	0	X	X	X	4

Sheet 4	1	2	3	4	5	6	7	8	9	10	Final
(Connecticut) Derek Surka 🔨	0	0	1	0	1	0	3	0	0	0	5
(New York (state)) Richard Van Cuyck	1	1	0	1	0	2	0	1	0	1	7

===== Draw 3 =====
Friday, January 6, 9:00 am

Sheet 1	1	2	3	4	5	6	7	8	9	10	Final
(New York (state)) Brian Damon	0	0	0	4	0	1	0	1	0	X	6
(Maryland) Brian Galebach 🔨	2	2	1	0	2	0	3	0	1	X	11

Sheet 2	1	2	3	4	5	6	7	8	9	10	Final
(New York (state)) Joe Calabrese	1	0	1	0	0	0	1	0	1	X	4
(New York (state)) Brandon Corbett 🔨	0	1	0	1	1	2	0	2	0	X	7

Sheet 3	1	2	3	4	5	6	7	8	9	10	Final
(Connecticut) Derek Surka 🔨	0	0	0	2	1	0	4	1	0	X	8
(Ohio) Matt Holtwick	1	1	2	0	0	1	0	0	0	X	5

Sheet 4	1	2	3	4	5	6	7	8	9	10	Final
(New York (state)) Heath McCormick	0	3	0	5	0	1	0	X	X	X	9
(New York (state)) Clark Raven 🔨	1	0	1	0	1	0	2	X	X	X	5

===== Draw 4 =====
Friday, January 6, 2:00 pm

Sheet 1	1	2	3	4	5	6	7	8	9	10	Final
(Connecticut) Derek Surka	0	0	2	0	1	0	X	X	X	X	3
(New York (state)) Brandon Corbett 🔨	3	2	0	2	0	2	X	X	X	X	9

Sheet 2	1	2	3	4	5	6	7	8	9	10	Final
(Ohio) Matt Holtwick	1	0	1	0	1	0	X	X	X	X	3
(New York (state)) Heath McCormick 🔨	0	2	0	3	0	4	X	X	X	X	9

Sheet 3	1	2	3	4	5	6	7	8	9	10	Final
(Maryland) Brian Galebach 🔨	3	1	0	0	0	0	1	0	2	X	7
(New York (state)) Richard Van Cuyck	0	0	0	1	2	0	0	1	0	X	4

Sheet 4	1	2	3	4	5	6	7	8	9	10	Final
(New York (state)) Brian Damon	0	1	0	0	4	1	0	1	1	X	8
(New York (state)) Joe Calabrese 🔨	1	0	0	1	0	0	1	0	0	X	3

===== Draw 5 =====
Friday, January 6, 7:00 pm

Sheet 1	1	2	3	4	5	6	7	8	9	10	Final
(New York (state)) Heath McCormick	0	1	0	3	2	3	X	X	X	X	9
(New York (state)) Joe Calabrese 🔨	1	0	1	0	0	0	X	X	X	X	2

Sheet 2	1	2	3	4	5	6	7	8	9	10	Final
(New York (state)) Richard Van Cuyck	0	1	0	0	1	0	0	X	X	X	2
(New York (state)) Clark Raven 🔨	1	0	1	2	0	2	5	X	X	X	11

Sheet 3	1	2	3	4	5	6	7	8	9	10	Final
(New York (state)) Brian Damon	1	0	1	0	0	1	0	0	1	0	4
(Connecticut) Derek Surka	0	1	0	1	0	0	0	3	0	1	6

Sheet 4	1	2	3	4	5	6	7	8	9	10	Final
(New York (state)) Brandon Corbett 🔨	0	0	2	0	3	1	0	1	X	X	7
(Maryland) Brian Galebach	0	1	0	0	0	0	1	0	X	X	2

===== Draw 6 =====
Saturday, January 7, 9:00 am

Sheet 1	1	2	3	4	5	6	7	8	9	10	11	Final
(New York (state)) Brandon Corbett	0	0	0	0	1	0	1	1	1	0	0	4
(New York (state)) Brian Damon 🔨	0	0	0	1	0	1	0	0	0	2	1	5

Sheet 2	1	2	3	4	5	6	7	8	9	10	11	Final
(Connecticut) Derek Surka	0	0	2	0	1	2	0	0	1	0	1	7
(Maryland) Brian Galebach	0	1	0	1	0	0	1	1	0	2	0	6

Sheet 3	1	2	3	4	5	6	7	8	9	10	Final
(New York (state)) Joe Calabrese	0	0	2	0	2	0	1	0	5	X	10
(New York (state)) Clark Raven 🔨	0	2	0	0	0	1	0	1	0	X	4

Sheet 4	1	2	3	4	5	6	7	8	9	10	Final
(New York (state)) Richard Van Cuyck 🔨	2	1	0	0	0	0	1	0	0	X	4
(Ohio) Matt Holtwick	0	0	0	1	1	1	0	3	1	X	7

===== Draw 7 =====
Saturday, January 7, 2:00 pm

Sheet 1	1	2	3	4	5	6	7	8	9	10	Final
(New York (state)) Joe Calabrese 🔨	0	2	0	1	1	0	0	2	0	2	8
(Ohio) Matt Holtwick	0	0	1	0	0	1	4	0	1	0	7

Sheet 2	1	2	3	4	5	6	7	8	9	10	Final
(New York (state)) Clark Raven 🔨	1	0	0	2	0	1	2	0	0	0	6
(New York (state)) Brian Damon	0	0	1	0	2	0	0	2	1	1	7

Sheet 3	1	2	3	4	5	6	7	8	9	10	Final
(New York (state)) Richard Van Cuyck	0	1	0	0	1	0	X	X	X	X	2
(New York (state)) Brandon Corbett 🔨	2	0	2	3	0	2	X	X	X	X	9

Sheet 4	1	2	3	4	5	6	7	8	9	10	Final
(Maryland) Brian Galebach 🔨	0	2	0	0	0	X	X	X	X	X	2
(New York (state)) Heath McCormick	2	0	3	2	2	X	X	X	X	X	9

===== Draw 8 =====
Saturday, January 7, 7:00 pm

Sheet 1	1	2	3	4	5	6	7	8	9	10	Final
(Connecticut) Derek Surka 🔨	0	1	0	0	2	0	0	1	1	0	5
(New York (state)) Heath McCormick	2	0	1	1	0	2	0	0	0	1	7

Sheet 2	1	2	3	4	5	6	7	8	9	10	Final
(New York (state)) Richard Van Cuyck	2	0	1	0	0	0	0	0	X	X	3
(New York (state)) Joe Calabrese 🔨	0	1	0	2	1	2	1	3	X	X	10

Sheet 3	Final
(New York (state)) Clark Raven	NP
(Maryland) Brian Galebach	NP

Sheet 4	1	2	3	4	5	6	7	8	9	10	Final
(Ohio) Matt Holtwick 🔨	0	0	1	1	1	0	0	1	X	X	4
(New York (state)) Brian Damon	2	1	0	0	0	3	2	0	X	X	8

===== Draw 9 =====
Saturday, January 7, 9:00 am

Sheet 1	1	2	3	4	5	6	7	8	9	10	Final
(New York (state)) Brian Damon 🔨	0	2	0	1	0	0	0	2	3	X	8
(New York (state)) Richard Van Cuyck	1	0	1	0	1	1	1	0	0	X	5

Sheet 2	Final
(Ohio) Matt Holtwick	NP
(New York (state)) Clark Raven	NP

Sheet 3	1	2	3	4	5	6	7	8	9	10	Final
(New York (state)) Brandon Corbett 🔨	2	0	0	1	0	0	1	1	1	0	6
(New York (state)) Heath McCormick	0	3	1	0	0	2	0	0	0	3	9

Sheet 4	1	2	3	4	5	6	7	8	9	10	Final
(Connecticut) Derek Surka	0	1	0	0	0	1	0	0	X	X	7
(New York (state)) Joe Calabrese 🔨	1	0	1	2	2	0	0	1	X	X	2

==== Tiebreakers ====
Round 1		Round 2
		(New York (state)) Brandon Corbett	5
(Connecticut) Derek Surka	11	(Connecticut) Derek Surka	6
(New York (state)) Brian Damon	6

===== Round 1 =====
Sunday, January 8, 2:00 pm

Team	1	2	3	4	5	6	7	8	9	10	Final
(Connecticut) Derek Surka	2	0	1	0	0	3	0	5	X	X	11
(New York (state)) Brian Damon 🔨	0	1	0	1	3	0	1	0	X	X	6

===== Round 2 =====
Sunday, January 8, 7:00 pm

Team	1	2	3	4	5	6	7	8	9	10	Final
(New York (state)) Brandon Corbett 🔨	1	0	0	0	2	1	0	0	1	0	5
(Connecticut) Derek Surka	0	0	1	1	0	0	1	1	0	2	6

=== Seattle qualifier ===
The Seattle qualifier was held at the Granite Curling Club in Seattle, Washington. It was held in a round robin format. At the conclusion of the round robin, the top team qualified directly to the Nationals, and the second-ranked team qualified to the challenge round. The team skipped by Wes Johnson qualified directly to the Nationals, while the team skipped by Sean Beighton qualified to the challenge round.

==== Standings ====
Final round-robin standings

Skip	W	L
(Washington (state)) Wes Johnson	4	0
(Washington (state)) Sean Beighton	3	1
(Washington (state)) Benjamin Guzman	1	3
(Washington (state)) Doug Kauffman	1	3
(Washington (state)) Christopher Pleasants	1	3

Standings after tiebreakers

Skip	W	L
(Washington (state)) Wes Johnson	5	0
(Washington (state)) Sean Beighton	3	2
(Washington (state)) Benjamin Guzman	1	3
(Washington (state)) Doug Kauffman	1	3
(Washington (state)) Christopher Pleasants	1	3

==== Round-robin results ====
===== Draw 1 =====
Thursday, January 5, 7:00 pm

Sheet 2	1	2	3	4	5	6	7	8	9	10	Final
(Washington (state)) Wes Johnson 🔨	4	0	4	0	0	2	X	X	X	X	10
(Washington (state)) Doug Kauffman	0	1	0	2	1	0	X	X	X	X	4

Sheet 3	1	2	3	4	5	6	7	8	9	10	Final
(Washington (state)) Sean Beighton 🔨	1	0	3	2	0	2	0	1	X	X	9
(Washington (state)) Christopher Pleasants	0	1	0	0	1	0	1	0	X	X	3

===== Draw 2 =====
Friday, January 6, 1:00 pm

Sheet 4	1	2	3	4	5	6	7	8	9	10	Final
(Washington (state)) Wes Johnson 🔨	2	0	2	0	3	1	1	0	X	X	9
(Washington (state)) Benjamin Guzman	0	2	0	1	0	0	0	1	X	X	4

Sheet 5	1	2	3	4	5	6	7	8	9	10	Final
(Washington (state)) Doug Kauffman	0	2	0	0	0	2	1	1	0	2	8
(Washington (state)) Christopher Pleasants 🔨	1	0	3	1	1	0	0	0	1	0	7

===== Draw 3 =====
Friday, January 6, 7:00 pm

Sheet 1	1	2	3	4	5	6	7	8	9	10	Final
(Washington (state)) Christopher Pleasants 🔨	1	0	2	1	0	0	0	X	X	X	4
(Washington (state)) Wes Johnson	0	3	0	0	2	2	3	X	X	X	10

Sheet 2	1	2	3	4	5	6	7	8	9	10	Final
(Washington (state)) Benjamin Guzman	1	0	1	1	0	0	0	1	0	X	4
(Washington (state)) Sean Beighton 🔨	0	1	0	0	2	2	1	0	2	X	8

===== Draw 4 =====
Saturday, January 7, 9:00 am

Sheet 3	1	2	3	4	5	6	7	8	9	10	Final
(Washington (state)) Christopher Pleasants 🔨	0	0	0	0	0	3	0	3	2	X	8
(Washington (state)) Benjamin Guzman	0	0	0	0	1	0	1	0	0	X	2

Sheet 4	1	2	3	4	5	6	7	8	9	10	Final
(Washington (state)) Doug Kauffman 🔨	0	1	0	1	0	0	0	0	0	0	2
(Washington (state)) Sean Beighton	0	0	2	0	0	0	1	1	0	1	5

===== Draw 5 =====
Saturday, January 7, 2:00 pm

Sheet 1	1	2	3	4	5	6	7	8	9	10	Final
(Washington (state)) Benjamin Guzman	0	1	0	2	3	0	2	1	0	X	9
(Washington (state)) Doug Kauffman 🔨	1	0	3	0	0	1	0	0	2	X	7

Sheet 5	1	2	3	4	5	6	7	8	9	10	Final
(Washington (state)) Sean Beighton 🔨	0	0	1	0	2	0	2	0	1	0	6
(Washington (state)) Wes Johnson	1	0	0	2	0	2	0	1	0	1	7

==== Tiebreaker ====
The "tiebreaker" was played in accordance with the double knockout provision. Wes Johnson and Sean Beighton were the top two teams in the pool, and even though Johnson was undefeated, a deciding game needed to be held between Johnson and Beighton. Beighton had one loss (from losing to Johnson), and Johnson had none. If Beighton had won the tiebreaker, he and Johnson would have had one loss apiece, and would have needed to decide which team would advance to the nationals by playing another tiebreaker, which would have given one team two losses, therefore eliminating that team from the top spot. Johnson won this tiebreaker, so Beighton, with two losses, took second place.

Saturday, January 7, 7:00 pm

Team	1	2	3	4	5	6	7	8	9	10	Final
(Washington (state)) Wes Johnson 🔨	0	1	1	0	2	0	0	0	0	2	6
(Washington (state)) Sean Beighton	2	0	0	1	0	2	0	0	0	0	5

=== Grand Forks qualifier ===
The Grand Forks qualifier was held at the Grand Forks Curling Club in Grand Forks, North Dakota. It will be held in a triple knockout format. Two teams qualified directly to the Nationals, and four teams qualified to the challenge round. The team skipped by John Shuster qualified directly to the Nationals by winning the A Event, and the team skipped by Owen Sampson qualified directly to the Nationals by winning the B Event. Teams skipped by Eric Fenson, Peter Stolt, Ryan Berg, and Todd Birr qualified to the challenge round.

==== Knockout brackets ====
===== A event =====
The qualifier in the A event will be qualified to participate in the Nationals.

First Knockout
(Minnesota) Mark Haluptzok	8
(North Dakota) Owen Sampson	12
(North Dakota) Kevin Kakela	10
(North Dakota) Scott Brown	8
(Minnesota) Eric Fenson
(North Dakota) Adam Kitchens
(Minnesota) Peter Stolt	7
(New York (state)) Bill Morehouse	5
(Minnesota) Matt Stevens	4
(North Dakota) Ryan Berg	7

Quarterfinals
(North Dakota) Owen Sampson	4
(Minnesota) Todd Birr	9
(North Dakota) Kevin Kakela	7
(Minnesota) Eric Fenson	0
(Minnesota) Peter Stolt	3
(Minnesota) John Shuster	9
(North Dakota) Ryan Berg	4
(Florida) Jason Smith	9

Semifinals
(Minnesota) Todd Birr	6
(North Dakota) Kevin Kakela	5
(Minnesota) John Shuster	8
(Florida) Jason Smith	4

Qualifier 1
(Minnesota) Todd Birr	5
(Minnesota) John Shuster	10

===== B event =====
The qualifier in the B event will be qualified to participate in the Nationals.

Quarterfinals		Semifinals		To Pre-Qualifier
				(North Dakota) Owen Sampson	4
(North Dakota) Owen Sampson	10			(Florida) Jason Smith	3
(New York (state)) Bill Morehouse	3	(North Dakota) Owen Sampson	10
(Minnesota) Matt Stevens	6	(Minnesota) Eric Fenson	5
(Minnesota) Eric Fenson	7

Round of 16
(North Dakota) Scott Brown	4
(North Dakota) Adam Kitchens	8

Quarterfinals
(North Dakota) Ryan Berg	11
(North Dakota) Adam Kitchens	3
(Minnesota) Mark Haluptzok	6
(Minnesota) Peter Stolt	7

Semifinals
(North Dakota) Ryan Berg	6
(Minnesota) Peter Stolt	5

To Pre-Qualifier
(North Dakota) Ryan Berg	10
(North Dakota) Kevin Kakela	7

Pre-Qualifier		Qualifier 2
(North Dakota) Owen Sampson	6
(North Dakota) Ryan Berg	3	(North Dakota) Owen Sampson	8
		(Minnesota) Todd Birr	6

===== C event =====
All qualifiers in the C event will qualify to participate in the challenge round.

Semifinals			Qualifier 1
			1	(North Dakota) Kevin Kakela	2
2	(North Dakota) Adam Kitchens	3		(Minnesota) Eric Fenson	6
3	(Minnesota) Eric Fenson	8

Qualifier 2
1	(Florida) Jason Smith	6
2	(Minnesota) Peter Stolt	9

Semifinals			Qualifier 3
			1	(North Dakota) Ryan Berg	9
2	(Minnesota) Matt Stevens	11		(Minnesota) Matt Stevens	3
3	(Minnesota) Mark Haluptzok	8

Semifinals			Qualifier 4
			1	(Minnesota) Todd Birr	9
2	(North Dakota) Steve Brown	8		(New York (state)) Bill Morehouse	2
3	(New York (state)) Bill Morehouse	9

==== Knockout results ====
===== Draw 1 =====
Thursday, January 5, 7:00 pm

Sheet 1	1	2	3	4	5	6	7	8	9	10	Final
(Minnesota) Peter Stolt 🔨	2	1	0	0	2	0	0	1	0	1	7
(New York (state)) Bill Morehouse	0	0	3	0	0	0	1	0	1	0	5

Sheet 2	1	2	3	4	5	6	7	8	9	10	Final
(North Dakota) Kevin Kakela 🔨	3	0	3	1	0	0	2	0	0	1	10
(North Dakota) Scott Brown	0	2	0	0	2	0	0	3	1	0	8

Sheet 3	1	2	3	4	5	6	7	8	9	10	Final
(Minnesota) Matt Stevens	0	0	1	0	0	2	0	1	0	X	4
(North Dakota) Ryan Berg 🔨	1	0	0	2	2	0	1	0	1	X	7

Sheet 4	1	2	3	4	5	6	7	8	9	10	Final
(Minnesota) Mark Haluptzok	2	0	0	0	1	0	2	2	1	0	8
(North Dakota) Owen Sampson 🔨	0	1	2	2	0	2	0	0	0	5	12

===== Draw 2 =====
Friday, January 6, 9:00 am

Sheet 1	1	2	3	4	5	6	7	8	9	10	Final
(North Dakota) Owen Sampson 🔨	1	0	0	1	0	1	0	X	X	X	4
(Minnesota) Todd Birr	0	2	2	0	4	0	1	X	X	X	9

Sheet 2	1	2	3	4	5	6	7	8	9	10	Final
(North Dakota) Ryan Berg	0	0	2	0	1	0	0	1	X	X	4
(Florida) Jason Smith 🔨	0	3	0	2	0	0	4	0	X	X	9

Sheet 3	1	2	3	4	5	6	7	8	9	10	Final
(Minnesota) Eric Fenson	3	0	3	0	1	0	0	2	X	X	9
(North Dakota) Adam Kitchens 🔨	0	2	0	1	0	0	1	0	X	X	4

Sheet 4	1	2	3	4	5	6	7	8	9	10	Final
(Minnesota) Peter Stolt 🔨	1	0	0	1	0	1	0	X	X	X	3
(Minnesota) John Shuster	0	2	2	0	4	0	1	X	X	X	9

===== Draw 3 =====
Friday, January 6, 2:00 pm

Sheet 1	1	2	3	4	5	6	7	8	9	10	Final
(North Dakota) Scott Brown 🔨	1	0	0	0	0	2	0	1	0	X	4
(North Dakota) Adam Kitchens	0	0	4	1	0	0	1	0	2	X	8

Sheet 3	1	2	3	4	5	6	7	8	9	10	Final
(North Dakota) Owen Sampson 🔨	3	0	1	3	0	3	X	X	X	X	10
(New York (state)) Bill Morehouse	0	1	0	0	2	0	X	X	X	X	3

Sheet 4	1	2	3	4	5	6	7	8	9	10	Final
(North Dakota) Kevin Kakela 🔨	1	0	1	1	1	1	2	X	X	X	7
(Minnesota) Eric Fenson	0	0	0	0	0	0	0	X	X	X	0

===== Draw 4 =====
Friday, January 6, 7:00 pm

Sheet 1	1	2	3	4	5	6	7	8	9	10	Final
(Minnesota) Matt Stevens	0	0	0	1	2	0	1	0	2	0	6
(Minnesota) Eric Fenson 🔨	0	0	3	0	0	2	0	1	0	1	7

Sheet 2	1	2	3	4	5	6	7	8	9	10	Final
(Minnesota) Mark Haluptzok 🔨	0	1	0	3	0	0	0	0	2	0	6
(Minnesota) Peter Stolt	1	0	2	0	1	0	1	1	0	1	7

Sheet 4	1	2	3	4	5	6	7	8	9	10	Final
(North Dakota) Ryan Berg	2	1	0	2	1	1	0	4	X	X	11
(North Dakota) Adam Kitchens 🔨	0	0	2	0	0	0	1	0	X	X	3

===== Draw 5 =====
Saturday, January 7, 9:00 am

Sheet 1	1	2	3	4	5	6	7	8	9	10	Final
(Minnesota) John Shuster	0	0	2	0	2	0	1	1	2	X	8
(Florida) Jason Smith 🔨	1	1	0	1	0	1	0	0	0	X	4

Sheet 2	1	2	3	4	5	6	7	8	9	10	Final
(Minnesota) Todd Birr	0	4	0	0	0	0	0	0	1	1	6
(North Dakota) Kevin Kakela 🔨	0	0	1	1	1	0	1	1	0	0	5

Sheet 3	1	2	3	4	5	6	7	8	9	10	Final
(North Dakota) Ryan Berg	0	0	0	0	0	2	0	3	0	1	6
(Minnesota) Peter Stolt 🔨	0	1	1	1	0	0	1	0	1	0	5

Sheet 4	1	2	3	4	5	6	7	8	9	10	Final
(North Dakota) Owen Sampson	0	2	1	0	1	0	3	0	3	X	10
(Minnesota) Eric Fenson 🔨	1	0	0	1	0	1	0	2	0	X	5

===== Draw 6 =====
Saturday, January 7, 2:00 pm

Sheet 2	1	2	3	4	5	6	7	8	9	10	11	Final
(North Dakota) Owen Sampson	0	0	0	1	0	0	0	2	0	0	1	4
(Florida) Jason Smith 🔨	1	0	0	0	0	1	0	0	0	1	0	3

Sheet 3	1	2	3	4	5	6	7	8	9	10	Final
(Minnesota) Todd Birr	0	1	0	1	1	0	0	2	0	X	5
(Minnesota) John Shuster 🔨	2	0	1	0	0	2	3	0	2	X	10

Sheet 4	1	2	3	4	5	6	7	8	9	10	Final
(North Dakota) Ryan Berg 🔨	0	1	0	2	0	1	2	0	3	1	10
(North Dakota) Kevin Kakela	1	0	1	0	3	0	0	2	0	0	7

===== Draw 7 =====
Saturday, January 7, 7:00 pm

Sheet 1	1	2	3	4	5	6	7	8	9	10	Final
(North Dakota) Owen Sampson	1	0	0	1	1	1	1	0	1	X	6
(North Dakota) Ryan Berg 🔨	0	1	1	0	0	0	0	1	0	X	3

Sheet 2	1	2	3	4	5	6	7	8	9	10	Final
(North Dakota) Steve Brown	0	0	4	0	0	1	0	0	1	2	8
(New York (state)) Bill Morehouse 🔨	1	1	0	2	2	0	3	0	0	0	9

Sheet 3	1	2	3	4	5	6	7	8	9	10	Final
(North Dakota) Adam Kitchens	0	0	2	0	0	0	1	0	X	X	3
(Minnesota) Eric Fenson 🔨	1	1	0	2	1	2	0	1	X	X	8

Sheet 4	1	2	3	4	5	6	7	8	9	10	Final
(Minnesota) Matt Stevens 🔨	1	0	0	0	2	0	2	1	2	3	11
(Minnesota) Mark Haluptzok	0	0	2	2	0	4	0	0	0	0	8

===== Draw 8 =====
Sunday, January 8, 9:00 am

Sheet 2	1	2	3	4	5	6	7	8	9	10	Final
(Minnesota) Todd Birr	0	0	3	0	1	1	0	0	1	0	6
(North Dakota) Owen Sampson 🔨	2	0	0	2	0	0	1	2	0	1	8

===== Draw 9 =====
Sunday, January 8, 2:00 pm

Sheet 1	1	2	3	4	5	6	7	8	9	10	Final
(Florida) Jason Smith 🔨	2	0	0	1	3	0	0	0	0	0	6
(Minnesota) Peter Stolt	0	1	0	0	0	1	2	2	1	2	9

Sheet 2	1	2	3	4	5	6	7	8	9	10	Final
(North Dakota) Kevin Kakela 🔨	1	0	0	0	0	1	0	X	X	X	2
(Minnesota) Eric Fenson	0	0	1	2	1	0	2	X	X	X	6

Sheet 3	1	2	3	4	5	6	7	8	9	10	Final
(North Dakota) Ryan Berg 🔨	0	3	0	4	0	1	0	1	X	X	9
(Minnesota) Matt Stevens	0	0	1	0	1	0	1	0	X	X	3

Sheet 4	1	2	3	4	5	6	7	8	9	10	Final
(Minnesota) Todd Birr 🔨	2	3	0	4	X	X	X	X	X	X	9
(New York (state)) Bill Morehouse	0	0	2	0	X	X	X	X	X	X	2

=== Green Bay qualifier ===
The Green Bay qualifier was held at the Green Bay Curling Club in Green Bay, Wisconsin. It was held in a round robin format. At the conclusion of the round robin, one team qualified directly to the Nationals, and two teams qualified to the challenge round. The team skipped by Blake Morton qualified directly to the Nationals, while the teams skipped by John Benton and Mike Farbelow qualified to the challenge round.

==== Standings ====
Final round-robin standings

Skip	W	L
(Wisconsin) John Benton	3	2
(Minnesota) Mike Farbelow	3	2
(Wisconsin) Blake Morton	3	2
(Minnesota) Paul Pustovar	3	2
(Minnesota) Joey Bonfoey	2	3
(Wisconsin) Matt Rudig	1	4

Standings after tiebreakers

Skip	W	L
(Wisconsin) Blake Morton	5	2
(Wisconsin) John Benton	4	3
(Minnesota) Mike Farbelow	4	3
(Minnesota) Paul Pustovar	3	4
(Minnesota) Joey Bonfoey	2	3
(Wisconsin) Matt Rudig	1	4

==== Round-robin results ====
===== Draw 1 =====
Thursday, January 5, 2:00 pm

Sheet 1	1	2	3	4	5	6	7	8	9	10	Final
(Minnesota) Joey Bonfoey	0	0	1	0	0	0	0	X	X	X	1
(Minnesota) Paul Pustovar 🔨	2	0	0	1	0	1	3	X	X	X	7

Sheet 2	1	2	3	4	5	6	7	8	9	10	Final
(Wisconsin) John Benton 🔨	1	0	0	0	1	1	0	3	0	1	7
(Wisconsin) Blake Morton	0	3	2	1	0	0	1	0	1	0	8

Sheet 3	1	2	3	4	5	6	7	8	9	10	Final
(Minnesota) Mike Farbelow	1	1	3	4	3	X	X	X	X	X	12
(Wisconsin) Matt Rudig 🔨	0	0	0	0	0	X	X	X	X	X	0

===== Draw 2 =====
Thursday, January 5, 7:00 pm

Sheet 1	1	2	3	4	5	6	7	8	9	10	Final
(Minnesota) Mike Farbelow 🔨	3	0	0	1	2	0	3	X	X	X	9
(Wisconsin) Blake Morton	0	1	0	0	0	1	0	X	X	X	2

Sheet 2	1	2	3	4	5	6	7	8	9	10	Final
(Wisconsin) Matt Rudig	0	0	2	0	1	0	X	X	X	X	3
(Minnesota) Paul Pustovar 🔨	4	1	0	4	0	2	X	X	X	X	11

Sheet 3	1	2	3	4	5	6	7	8	9	10	11	Final
(Wisconsin) John Benton	0	0	0	2	0	0	3	0	0	2	0	7
(Minnesota) Joey Bonfoey 🔨	3	0	1	0	0	2	0	1	0	0	2	9

===== Draw 3 =====
Friday, January 6, 2:00 pm

Team	1	2	3	4	5	6	7	8	9	10	Final
(Minnesota) Paul Pustovar 🔨	0	0	2	0	0	0	0	0	0	1	3
(Wisconsin) John Benton	0	1	0	0	1	0	0	1	1	0	4

Team	1	2	3	4	5	6	7	8	9	10	Final
(Minnesota) Mike Farbelow 🔨	2	0	0	1	1	1	4	X	X	X	9
(Minnesota) Joey Bonfoey	0	1	0	0	0	0	0	X	X	X	1

Team	1	2	3	4	5	6	7	8	9	10	Final
(Wisconsin) Matt Rudig	0	1	0	0	0	0	1	1	0	X	3
(Wisconsin) Blake Morton 🔨	0	0	1	2	3	1	0	0	2	X	9

===== Draw 4 =====
Friday, January 6, 8:00 pm

Sheet 1	1	2	3	4	5	6	7	8	9	10	Final
(Wisconsin) Blake Morton	0	0	3	0	1	0	2	0	0	X	6
(Minnesota) Joey Bonfoey 🔨	1	2	0	5	0	1	0	0	1	X	10

Sheet 2	1	2	3	4	5	6	7	8	9	10	Final
(Wisconsin) John Benton	0	0	0	3	3	3	X	X	X	X	9
(Wisconsin) Matt Rudig 🔨	0	1	0	0	0	0	X	X	X	X	1

Sheet 3	1	2	3	4	5	6	7	8	9	10	Final
(Minnesota) Paul Pustovar 🔨	0	2	0	1	0	2	1	2	0	0	8
(Minnesota) Mike Farbelow	0	0	2	0	2	0	0	0	2	1	7

===== Draw 5 =====
Saturday, January 7, 11:00 am

Sheet 1	1	2	3	4	5	6	7	8	9	10	Final
(Wisconsin) John Benton 🔨	0	3	0	3	1	0	3	X	X	X	10
(Minnesota) Mike Farbelow	0	0	1	0	0	1	0	X	X	X	2

Sheet 2	1	2	3	4	5	6	7	8	9	10	Final
(Wisconsin) Blake Morton 🔨	0	1	0	0	1	1	0	0	3	2	8
(Minnesota) Paul Pustovar	2	0	1	0	0	0	0	1	0	0	4

Sheet 3	1	2	3	4	5	6	7	8	9	10	Final
(Minnesota) Joey Bonfoey 🔨	2	0	0	1	0	0	1	0	0	0	4
(Wisconsin) Matt Rudig	0	0	1	0	1	0	0	2	1	1	6

==== Tiebreakers ====
===== Round 1 =====
Saturday, January 7, 4:00 pm

Team	1	2	3	4	5	6	7	8	9	10	Final
(Wisconsin) Blake Morton 🔨	1	0	0	0	1	2	0	1	0	2	7
(Minnesota) Mike Farbelow	0	2	0	0	0	0	1	0	2	0	5

Team	1	2	3	4	5	6	7	8	9	10	Final
(Wisconsin) John Benton	0	0	1	1	2	0	0	4	X	X	8
(Minnesota) Paul Pustovar 🔨	0	0	0	0	0	2	0	0	X	X	2

===== Round 2 =====
Saturday, January 7, 9:00 pm

Team	1	2	3	4	5	6	7	8	9	10	Final
(Wisconsin) Blake Morton 🔨	1	0	0	2	0	0	2	2	0	X	7
(Wisconsin) John Benton	0	2	0	0	0	0	0	0	1	X	3

Team	1	2	3	4	5	6	7	8	9	10	Final
(Minnesota) Mike Farbelow 🔨	5	0	1	0	2	0	X	X	X	X	8
(Minnesota) Paul Pustovar	0	1	0	2	0	1	X	X	X	X	4

== Challenge round ==
The challenge round was held from January 19 to 22 at the Eau Claire Curling Club in Eau Claire, Wisconsin. A maximum of ten teams could compete in the challenge round, and three teams advanced to the nationals. A maximum of eight teams from the qualifiers could compete in the challenge round, while a minimum of two teams were chosen based on their Order of Merit. The teams skipped by Eric Fenson, Mike Farbelow, and Todd Birr advanced to the nationals.

=== Teams ===
The teams are listed as follows:

Skip	Third	Second	Lead	Alternate	Locale	Qualification method
Ryan Lemke (fourth)	John Benton (skip)	John Lilla	Steve Day		Medford, Wisconsin	Green Bay Qualifier
Mike Farbelow	Kevin Deeren	Kraig Deeren	Tim Solin		Minneapolis, Minnesota	Green Bay Qualifier
~~Sean Beighton~~^{1}	~~Andrew Ernst~~	~~Samuel Galey~~	~~MacAllan Guy~~		(Washington (state)) Seattle, Washington	Seattle Qualifier
Ryan Berg	Mitch Oakland	Al Gulseth	Jordan Brown		West Fargo, North Dakota	Grand Forks Qualifier
Todd Birr	Greg Romaniuk	Doug Pottinger	Thomas O'Connor	Kevin Birr	Mankato, Minnesota	Grand Forks Qualifier
Eric Fenson	Trevor Andrews	Quentin Way	Mark Lazar		Bemidji, Minnesota	Grand Forks Qualifier
Peter Stolt	Jerod Roland	Brad Caldwell	Erik Ordway		St. Paul, Minnesota	Grand Forks Qualifier
Derek Surka	Alex Leichter	Chris Bond	Jared Wydysh	Bryan Fink	New Haven, Connecticut	Laurel Qualifier
Paul Pustovar	Nicholas Myers	Andrew Jukich	Jeff Puleo	Harold Rutan	Hibbing, Minnesota	Order of Merit
Sean Murray	Scott Edie	Mark Mooney	Mike Graziano	Brandon Corbett	(New York (state)) Rochester, New York	Order of Merit

Notes

1. Beighton declined his berth to the challenge round.

=== Round-robin standings ===
Final round-robin standings

Skip	W	L
(Minnesota) Eric Fenson	7	1
(Minnesota) Mike Farbelow	6	2
(Minnesota) Todd Birr	6	2
(Connecticut) Derek Surka	5	3
(Wisconsin) John Benton	3	5
(Minnesota) Paul Pustovar	3	5
(Minnesota) Peter Stolt	2	5
(North Dakota) Ryan Berg	2	6
(New York (state)) Sean Murray	1	6

=== Round-robin results ===
==== Draw 1 ====
Thursday, January 19, 2:00 pm

Sheet 1	1	2	3	4	5	6	7	8	9	10	Final
(Wisconsin) John Benton 🔨	0	0	0	2	2	0	3	0	1	X	8
(Minnesota) Peter Stolt	0	0	1	0	0	1	0	1	0	X	3

Sheet 2	1	2	3	4	5	6	7	8	9	10	Final
(Connecticut) Derek Surka	0	0	0	1	0	1	0	X	X	X	2
(Minnesota) Mike Farbelow 🔨	2	1	2	0	1	0	1	X	X	X	7

Sheet 3	1	2	3	4	5	6	7	8	9	10	Final
(North Dakota) Ryan Berg 🔨	0	0	1	0	0	0	0	1	0	X	2
(Minnesota) Todd Birr	0	0	0	3	1	0	2	0	1	X	7

Sheet 4	1	2	3	4	5	6	7	8	9	10	Final
(Minnesota) Eric Fenson 🔨	1	0	2	0	2	0	3	0	0	3	11
(Minnesota) Paul Pustovar	0	2	0	1	0	2	0	1	2	0	8

==== Draw 2 ====
Thursday, January 19, 7:00 pm

Sheet 1	1	2	3	4	5	6	7	8	9	10	11	Final
(New York (state)) Sean Murray 🔨	0	1	0	0	3	0	0	1	0	2	1	8
(Minnesota) Todd Birr	0	0	1	1	0	3	0	0	2	0	0	7

Sheet 2	1	2	3	4	5	6	7	8	9	10	Final
(Minnesota) Eric Fenson 🔨	0	1	0	0	3	0	2	0	2	X	8
(Wisconsin) John Benton	0	0	1	0	0	1	0	1	0	X	3

Sheet 3	1	2	3	4	5	6	7	8	9	10	Final
(Minnesota) Paul Pustovar	0	0	1	0	1	0	0	1	1	0	4
(Minnesota) Peter Stolt 🔨	1	0	0	2	0	1	1	0	0	0	5

Sheet 4	1	2	3	4	5	6	7	8	9	10	Final
(North Dakota) Ryan Berg 🔨	1	0	1	0	3	0	X	X	X	X	5
(Minnesota) Mike Farbelow	0	2	0	5	0	7	X	X	X	X	14

==== Draw 3 ====
Friday, January 20, 9:00 am

Sheet 1	1	2	3	4	5	6	7	8	9	10	11	Final
(Minnesota) Peter Stolt	0	0	1	1	0	1	1	0	0	2	0	6
(Minnesota) Eric Fenson 🔨	2	0	0	0	2	0	0	0	2	0	1	7

Sheet 2	1	2	3	4	5	6	7	8	9	10	Final
(Minnesota) Paul Pustovar 🔨	2	1	0	2	0	2	3	X	X	X	10
(North Dakota) Ryan Berg	0	0	1	0	3	0	0	X	X	X	4

Sheet 3	1	2	3	4	5	6	7	8	9	10	Final
(New York (state)) Sean Murray	1	0	0	1	0	1	0	X	X	X	3
(Wisconsin) John Benton 🔨	0	0	3	0	2	0	3	X	X	X	8

Sheet 4	1	2	3	4	5	6	7	8	9	10	Final
(Minnesota) Todd Birr 🔨	1	1	0	2	1	0	4	X	X	X	9
(Connecticut) Derek Surka	0	0	1	0	0	1	0	X	X	X	2

==== Draw 4 ====
Friday, January 20, 2:00 pm

Sheet 1	1	2	3	4	5	6	7	8	9	10	Final
(North Dakota) Ryan Berg 🔨	0	3	0	0	0	0	0	1	0	0	4
(Connecticut) Derek Surka	0	0	1	1	2	1	0	0	1	1	7

Sheet 2	1	2	3	4	5	6	7	8	9	10	Final
(Minnesota) Mike Farbelow	0	0	0	1	1	0	1	0	0	0	3
(Minnesota) Peter Stolt 🔨	2	1	0	0	0	1	0	1	1	1	7

Sheet 3	1	2	3	4	5	6	7	8	9	10	Final
(Minnesota) Todd Birr 🔨	0	2	0	0	1	0	2	0	0	0	5
(Minnesota) Eric Fenson	1	0	0	2	0	2	0	1	0	1	7

Sheet 4	1	2	3	4	5	6	7	8	9	10	Final
(Minnesota) Paul Pustovar 🔨	0	0	3	0	1	2	0	1	1	X	8
(New York (state)) Sean Murray	0	1	0	2	0	0	1	0	0	X	4

==== Draw 5 ====
Friday, January 20, 7:00 pm

Sheet 1	1	2	3	4	5	6	7	8	9	10	Final
(Minnesota) Todd Birr 🔨	0	2	0	1	0	2	2	0	X	X	7
(Minnesota) Peter Stolt	0	0	2	0	0	0	0	1	X	X	3

Sheet 2	1	2	3	4	5	6	7	8	9	10	Final
(North Dakota) Ryan Berg 🔨	3	0	0	2	1	1	1	X	X	X	8
(New York (state)) Sean Murray	0	1	1	0	0	0	0	X	X	X	2

Sheet 3	1	2	3	4	5	6	7	8	9	10	Final
(Connecticut) Derek Surka 🔨	1	0	0	2	0	2	0	2	0	X	7
(Minnesota) Paul Pustovar	0	2	1	0	1	0	0	0	1	X	5

Sheet 4	1	2	3	4	5	6	7	8	9	10	Final
(Minnesota) Mike Farbelow	2	0	1	0	2	0	1	1	0	1	8
(Wisconsin) John Benton 🔨	0	1	0	1	0	1	0	0	1	0	4

==== Draw 6 ====
Saturday, January 21, 9:00 am

Sheet 1	1	2	3	4	5	6	7	8	9	10	Final
(Minnesota) Mike Farbelow 🔨	2	0	1	0	2	0	0	3	X	X	8
(Minnesota) Paul Pustovar	0	1	0	1	0	1	0	0	X	X	3

Sheet 2	1	2	3	4	5	6	7	8	9	10	Final
(Wisconsin) John Benton	0	0	2	0	1	0	0	1	0	0	4
(Connecticut) Derek Surka 🔨	0	1	0	1	0	1	0	0	2	1	6

Sheet 3	1	2	3	4	5	6	7	8	9	10	Final
(Minnesota) Eric Fenson	1	1	2	0	1	1	1	X	X	X	7
(New York (state)) Sean Murray 🔨	0	0	0	2	0	0	0	X	X	X	2

Sheet 4	1	2	3	4	5	6	7	8	9	10	Final
(Minnesota) Peter Stolt	0	1	0	1	0	2	1	1	1	0	7
(North Dakota) Ryan Berg 🔨	1	0	2	0	3	0	0	0	0	2	8

==== Draw 7 ====
Saturday, January 21, 2:00 pm

Sheet 1	1	2	3	4	5	6	7	8	9	10	Final
(Minnesota) Eric Fenson	0	2	0	0	1	0	0	1	0	2	6
(North Dakota) Ryan Berg 🔨	1	0	0	1	0	1	1	0	1	0	5

Sheet 2	1	2	3	4	5	6	7	8	9	10	Final
(New York (state)) Sean Murray 🔨	0	1	0	2	0	0	1	0	X	X	4
(Minnesota) Mike Farbelow	0	0	2	0	3	2	0	2	X	X	9

Sheet 3	1	2	3	4	5	6	7	8	9	10	Final
(Minnesota) Peter Stolt 🔨	1	0	1	0	0	1	1	1	0	0	5
(Connecticut) Derek Surka	0	2	0	0	1	0	0	0	2	1	6

Sheet 4	1	2	3	4	5	6	7	8	9	10	Final
(Wisconsin) John Benton	0	0	0	0	2	0	0	0	1	X	3
(Minnesota) Todd Birr 🔨	0	2	1	1	0	0	1	1	0	X	6

==== Draw 8 ====
Saturday, January 21, 7:00 pm

Sheet 1	1	2	3	4	5	6	7	8	9	10	Final
(Connecticut) Derek Surka 🔨	2	1	0	1	0	5	X	X	X	X	9
(New York (state)) Sean Murray	0	0	1	0	1	0	X	X	X	X	2

Sheet 2	1	2	3	4	5	6	7	8	9	10	Final
(Minnesota) Todd Birr 🔨	1	0	0	2	0	1	2	0	3	X	9
(Minnesota) Paul Pustovar	0	2	0	0	1	0	0	1	0	X	4

Sheet 3	1	2	3	4	5	6	7	8	9	10	Final
(Wisconsin) John Benton	0	1	1	0	1	0	1	1	1	1	7
(North Dakota) Ryan Berg	1	0	0	1	0	1	0	0	0	0	3

Sheet 4	1	2	3	4	5	6	7	8	9	10	Final
(Minnesota) Mike Farbelow 🔨	2	0	2	2	3	0	X	X	X	X	9
(Minnesota) Eric Fenson	0	0	0	0	0	1	X	X	X	X	1

==== Draw 9 ====
Sunday, January 22, 9:00 am

Sheet 1	1	2	3	4	5	6	7	8	9	10	Final
(Minnesota) Paul Pustovar 🔨	1	0	0	0	2	0	1	0	2	1	7
(Wisconsin) John Benton	0	1	1	2	0	1	0	1	0	0	6

Sheet 2	1	2	3	4	5	6	7	8	9	10	11	Final
(Connecticut) Derek Surka 🔨	0	3	2	0	0	0	2	0	0	1	0	8
(Minnesota) Eric Fenson	0	0	0	0	2	3	0	3	0	0	2	10

Sheet 3	1	2	3	4	5	6	7	8	9	10	Final
(Minnesota) Mike Farbelow 🔨	0	0	1	0	1	0	1	0	X	X	3
(Minnesota) Todd Birr	0	2	0	1	0	2	0	3	X	X	8

Sheet 4	Final
(New York (state)) Sean Murray	NP
(Minnesota) Peter Stolt	NP
