= 2013 United States Men's Curling Championship – Qualification =

Qualification for the 2013 United States Men's Curling Championship consisted of three different paths. Four teams qualified directly through the High Performance Program or the Order of Merit system. The number of the remaining entrants to the national championships was cut down to six teams through a challenge round held in early January.

== Qualification system ==
Teams qualified to participate in the men's national championship through the High Performance Program, through the World Curling Tour Order of Merit, or through a challenge round.

=== Automatic qualification ===
Two spots in the nationals were awarded to two teams on the United States Curling Association's High Performance National Program, established as an invitation-based program for the development of the top curling teams in the United States. The teams qualified through the High Performance Program were those skipped by Pete Fenson and Heath McCormick. Two more spots were awarded to the top two men's teams on the World Curling Tour Order of Merit standings table following the conclusion of the Iron Trail Motors Shoot-Out. If one or both of the top teams were already qualified for the nationals through the High Performance Program, the spot or spots would have been awarded to the team with the next highest position on the Order of Merit. The teams qualified through the Order of Merit were those skipped by Tyler George and John Shuster.

=== Challenge round ===
The remaining six spots in the nationals will be awarded to the teams that earn qualification spots through the challenge round. The challenge round was held in a triple knockout format, and was an open registration event. The teams that entered the challenge round were seeded through a strength of field ranking and through a peer ranking. The strength of field ranking was based on players' participation and performance in national championships and world championships. The seedings influenced the draw of the triple knockout event.

== Challenge round ==
The challenge round for the men's nationals was held from January 2 to 6 at the Hibbing Curling Club in Hibbing, Minnesota. The teams skipped by Craig Brown, Greg Persinger, Ryan Lemke, Brady Clark, Mike Farbelow, and Todd Birr advanced from the challenge round to the nationals.

=== Teams ===
The teams are listed as follows:

Skip	Third	Second	Lead	Locale
Ryan Berg	Al Gulseth	Mark Gulseth	Jordan Brown	West Fargo, North Dakota
Steve Birkild	Chris Bond	Matt Birklid	Atticus Wallace	(Washington (state)) Seattle, Washington
Todd Birr	Doug Pottinger	Greg Romaniuk	Thomas O'Connor	Mankato, Minnesota
Joseph Bonfoey	Ted Trolson	Joel Dietz	Matthew Carlson	Duluth, Minnesota
Craig Brown	Kroy Nernberger	Matt Hamilton	Jon Brunt	Madison, Wisconsin
Derrick Casper	Marcus Fonger	Tommy Juszczyk	Robert Splinter	Madison, Wisconsin
Brady Clark	Sean Beighton	Darren Lehto	Steve Lundeen	(Washington (state)) Seattle, Washington
Stuart Cohen	Kevin Mechenbier	Steve Scheffler	Adam Huffman	Columbus, Ohio
Brandon Corbett	Derek Corbett	Erik Jensen	Daniel Dudt	(New York (state)) Rochester, New York
Brian Damon	Michael Stefanik	Scott Parmelee	Charles Skinner	(New York (state)) Schenectady, New York
Richard Dimperio	Jeff Pulli	Jason Scott	Christopher Lopez	(New York (state)) Rochester, New York
Chris Dolan	Cameron McLelland	Tim Jeanetta	Brian Sparstad	Minneapolis, Minnesota
Mike Farbelow	Kevin Deeren	Kraig Deeren	Mark Lazar	St. Paul, Minnesota
Eric Fenson	Trevor Andrews	Blake Morton	Calvin Weber	Bemidji, Minnesota
Mark Haluptzok	Jerod Roland	Nic Wagner	Jon Chandler	Bemidji, Minnesota
Matt Holtwick	Nik Geller	Ryan Meyer	Phillip Wolf	Elyria, Ohio
Evan Jensen	Daniel Metcalf	Daniel Ruehl	Steven Gebauer	Medford, Wisconsin
Andy Jukich	Lyle Sieg	Matt Zbylut	Duane Rutan	Duluth, Minnesota
Kevin Kakela	Adam Kitchens	Kyle Kakela	Travis Kitchens	Rolla, North Dakota
Ryan Lemke	Nate Gebert	John Lilla	Casey Konopacky	Medford, Wisconsin
Matt Mielke	Alex Leichter	Nate Clark	Stephen Dropkin	Medford, Massachusetts
Kris Perkovich	Aaron Wald	Kevin Johnson	Taylor Skalsky	Chisholm, Minnesota
Greg Persinger	Nicholas Myers	Sean Murray	Tim Gartner	Fairbanks, Alaska
Jeff Puleo	Derek Surka	Cooper Smith	Joel Cooper (Note: Cooper is now known as JayCee due to gender transition.)	Forest Lake, Minnesota
Jeremy Roe	Steve Day	Patrick Roe	Mark Hartman	Rio, Wisconsin
Tyler Runing	Evan Workin	Parker Shook	Cole Jaeger	Mankato, Minnesota
Owen Sampson	Ned Sampson	Tucker Smith	Kyle Young	Edmore, North Dakota
Tom Scott	Ben Wilson	Tony Wilson	Nate Haskell	Hibbing, Minnesota
Matt Stevens	Robert Liapis	Cody Stevens	Jeff Breyen	Bemidji, Minnesota
Peter Stolt	Clayton Orvik	Erik Ordway	Bryan Hanson	Plymouth, Minnesota

=== Knockout Draw Brackets ===
The draw is listed as follows:

==== A Event ====
First Knockout
(Minnesota) Jeff Puleo	1
(Massachusetts) Matt Mielke	10
(North Dakota) Owen Sampson	14
(Minnesota) Evan Jensen	4
(Wisconsin) Jeremy Roe	9
(Minnesota) Chris Dolan	5
(Minnesota) Eric Fenson	9
(Ohio) Matt Holtwick	2
(Minnesota) Joseph Bonfoey	8
(New York (state)) Brandon Corbett	2
(Minnesota) Matt Stevens	6
(New York (state)) Richard Dimperio	2
(Alaska) Greg Persinger	8
(Washington (state)) Steve Birkild	6

Quarterfinals
(Massachusetts) Matt Mielke	2
(Minnesota) Todd Birr	4
(North Dakota) Owen Sampson	1
(Wisconsin) Jeremy Roe	10
(Minnesota) Eric Fenson	4
(Minnesota) Joseph Bonfoey	5
(Minnesota) Matt Stevens	3
(Alaska) Greg Persinger	7

Semifinals
(Minnesota) Todd Birr	8
(Wisconsin) Jeremy Roe	7
(Minnesota) Joseph Bonfoey	5
(Alaska) Greg Persinger	7

Qualifier 1
(Minnesota) Todd Birr	4
(Alaska) Greg Persinger	7

First Knockout
(Minnesota) Mark Haluptzok	3
(Minnesota) Andy Jukich	8
(Wisconsin) Derrick Casper	6
(Minnesota) Tyler Runing	5
(North Dakota) Kevin Kakela	9
(Minnesota) Tom Scott	3
(Minnesota) Mike Farbelow	10
(Ohio) Stuart Cohen	5
(Wisconsin) Ryan Lemke	11
(Minnesota) Peter Stolt	8
(Washington (state)) Brady Clark	7
(New York (state)) Brian Damon	4
(Minnesota) Kris Perkovich	5
(North Dakota) Ryan Berg	8

Quarterfinals
(Minnesota) Andy Jukich	2
(Wisconsin) Craig Brown	7
(Wisconsin) Derrick Casper	2
(North Dakota) Kevin Kakela	8
(Minnesota) Mike Farbelow	5
(Wisconsin) Ryan Lemke	8
(Washington (state)) Brady Clark	7
(North Dakota) Ryan Berg	3

Semifinals
(Wisconsin) Craig Brown	8
(North Dakota) Kevin Kakela	3
(Wisconsin) Ryan Lemke	2
(Washington (state)) Brady Clark	6

Qualifier 2
(Wisconsin) Craig Brown	8
(Washington (state)) Brady Clark	3

==== B Event ====
Second Knockout
(Minnesota) Evan Jensen	6
(Minnesota) Chris Dolan	8

Quarterfinals
(Minnesota) Matt Stevens	9
(Minnesota) Jeff Puleo	3
(Minnesota) Eric Fenson	8
(Minnesota) Chris Dolan	5

Semifinals
(Minnesota) Matt Stevens	5
(Minnesota) Eric Fenson	6

To Pre-qualifier 3
(North Dakota) Kevin Kakela	3
(Minnesota) Eric Fenson	7

Second Knockout
(Ohio) Matt Holtwick	1
(New York (state)) Brandon Corbett	10
(New York (state)) Richard Dimperio	3
(Washington (state)) Steve Birkild	8

Quarterfinals
(North Dakota) Owen Sampson	10
(New York (state)) Brandon Corbett	5
(Massachusetts) Matt Mielke	9
(Washington (state)) Steve Birkild	1

Semifinals
(North Dakota) Owen Sampson	8
(Massachusetts) Matt Mielke	3

To Pre-qualifier 3
(Wisconsin) Ryan Lemke	8
(North Dakota) Owen Sampson	7

Pre-qualifier 3		Qualifier 3
		(Minnesota) Todd Birr	3
(Minnesota) Eric Fenson	4	(Wisconsin) Ryan Lemke	8
(Wisconsin) Ryan Lemke	9

Second Knockout
(Minnesota) Tyler Runing	7
(Minnesota) Tom Scott	6

Quarterfinals
(North Dakota) Ryan Berg	10
(Minnesota) Mark Haluptzok	7
(Minnesota) Mike Farbelow	6
(Minnesota) Tyler Runing	7

Semifinals
(North Dakota) Ryan Berg	9
(Minnesota) Tyler Runing	2

To Pre-qualifier 4
(Wisconsin) Jeremy Roe	7
(North Dakota) Ryan Berg	4

Second Knockout
(Ohio) Stuart Cohen	3
(Minnesota) Peter Stolt	9
(New York (state)) Brian Damon	3
(Minnesota) Kris Perkovich	12

Quarterfinals
(Wisconsin) Derrick Casper	6
(Minnesota) Peter Stolt	10
(Minnesota) Andy Jukich	8
(Minnesota) Kris Perkovich	7

Semifinals
(Minnesota) Peter Stolt	8
(Minnesota) Andy Jukich	9

To Pre-qualifier 4
(Minnesota) Joseph Bonfoey	9
(Minnesota) Andy Jukich	7

Pre-qualifier 4		Qualifier 4
		(Washington (state)) Brady Clark	9
(Wisconsin) Jeremy Roe	2	(Minnesota) Joseph Bonfoey	2
(Minnesota) Joseph Bonfoey	7

==== C Event ====
Third Knockout		Quarterfinals		Semifinals		To Pre-qualifier 5
						(Minnesota) Andy Jukich	2
						(Minnesota) Mike Farbelow	8
		(Minnesota) Mark Haluptzok	4
(Minnesota) Evan Jensen	1	(Minnesota) Mike Farbelow	9
(Minnesota) Mike Farbelow	9			(Minnesota) Mike Farbelow	8
				(Massachusetts) Matt Mielke	0

Third Knockout		Quarterfinals		Semifinals		To Pre-qualifier 5
						(North Dakota) Ryan Berg	2
(Ohio) Matt Holtwick	8					(Minnesota) Matt Stevens	5
(Wisconsin) Derrick Casper	3	(Ohio) Matt Holtwick	1
(New York (state)) Richard Dimperio	1	(Minnesota) Kris Perkovich	10
(Minnesota) Kris Perkovich	10			(Minnesota) Kris Perkovich	5
				(Minnesota) Matt Stevens	7

Pre-qualifier 5		Semifinals		Qualifier 5
				(Minnesota) Joseph Bonfoey	6
(Minnesota) Mike Farbelow	7			(Minnesota) Mike Farbelow	7
(Minnesota) Matt Stevens	2	(Minnesota) Mike Farbelow	9
		(Minnesota) Eric Fenson	3

Third Knockout		Quarterfinals		Semifinals		To Pre-qualifier 6
						(North Dakota) Owen Sampson	10
						(Minnesota) Peter Stolt	1
		(Minnesota) Jeff Puleo	8
(Minnesota) Tom Scott	8	(Minnesota) Tom Scott	7
(Minnesota) Chris Dolan	7			(Minnesota) Jeff Puleo	5
				(Minnesota) Peter Stolt	8

Third Knockout		Quarterfinals		Semifinals		To Pre-qualifier 6
						(North Dakota) Kevin Kakela	6
(Ohio) Stuart Cohen	5					(New York (state)) Brandon Corbett	8
(New York (state)) Brandon Corbett	9	(New York (state)) Brandon Corbett	8
(New York (state)) Brian Damon	3	(Washington (state)) Steve Birkild	7
(Washington (state)) Steve Birkild	9			(New York (state)) Brandon Corbett	10
				(Minnesota) Tyler Runing	2

Pre-qualifier 6		Semifinals		Qualifier 6
				(Minnesota) Todd Birr	7
(North Dakota) Owen Sampson	9			(North Dakota) Owen Sampson	6
(New York (state)) Brandon Corbett	8	(North Dakota) Owen Sampson	9
		(Wisconsin) Jeremy Roe	4

=== Knockout results ===
All draw times listed in Central Standard Time (UTC-6).

==== Draw 1 ====
Wednesday, January 2, 4:00 pm

Sheet 1	1	2	3	4	5	6	7	8	9	10	Final
(Minnesota) Jeff Puleo	0	0	0	0	0	1	0	X	X	X	1
(Massachusetts) Matt Mielke	0	0	2	4	1	0	3	X	X	X	10

Sheet 2	1	2	3	4	5	6	7	8	9	10	Final
(North Dakota) Owen Sampson	2	0	1	0	2	1	2	0	6	X	14
(Minnesota) Evan Jensen	0	1	0	1	0	0	0	2	0	X	4

Sheet 3	1	2	3	4	5	6	7	8	9	10	Final
(Wisconsin) Jeremy Roe	1	1	1	0	0	2	2	1	1	X	9
(Minnesota) Chris Dolan	0	0	0	3	2	0	0	0	0	X	5

Sheet 4	1	2	3	4	5	6	7	8	9	10	Final
(Minnesota) Eric Fenson	1	0	3	0	4	0	1	X	X	X	9
(Minnesota) Tom Scott	0	0	0	2	0	0	0	X	X	X	2

Sheet 5	1	2	3	4	5	6	7	8	9	10	Final
(Minnesota) Joseph Bonfoey	0	0	1	0	1	0	4	2	X	X	8
(New York (state)) Brandon Corbett	0	0	0	1	0	1	0	0	X	X	2

Sheet 6	1	2	3	4	5	6	7	8	9	10	Final
(Minnesota) Matt Stevens	0	2	0	0	0	2	0	0	2	X	6
(New York (state)) Richard Dimperio	1	0	0	0	0	0	0	1	0	X	2

Sheet 7	1	2	3	4	5	6	7	8	9	10	Final
(Alaska) Greg Persinger	1	0	0	2	0	2	0	0	0	3	8
(Washington (state)) Steve Birkild	0	0	1	0	1	0	2	1	1	0	6

==== Draw 2 ====
Wednesday, January 2, 8:00 pm

Sheet 1	1	2	3	4	5	6	7	8	9	10	Final
(Minnesota) Mark Haluptzok	0	0	0	0	1	0	2	0	X	X	3
(Minnesota) Andy Jukich	0	1	1	2	0	2	0	2	X	X	8

Sheet 2	1	2	3	4	5	6	7	8	9	10	11	Final
(Wisconsin) Derrick Casper	0	3	0	0	0	2	0	0	0	0	1	6
(Minnesota) Tyler Runing	0	0	2	1	0	0	0	0	1	1	0	5

Sheet 3	1	2	3	4	5	6	7	8	9	10	Final
(North Dakota) Kevin Kakela	0	2	0	3	1	2	0	1	X	X	9
(Minnesota) Tom Scott	1	0	1	0	0	0	1	0	X	X	3

Sheet 4	1	2	3	4	5	6	7	8	9	10	Final
(Minnesota) Mike Farbelow	2	0	2	1	0	3	2	0	0	X	10
(Ohio) Stuart Cohen	0	1	0	0	2	0	0	2	0	X	5

Sheet 5	1	2	3	4	5	6	7	8	9	10	Final
(Wisconsin) Ryan Lemke	3	1	0	0	1	0	2	0	3	1	11
(Minnesota) Peter Stolt	0	0	3	1	0	2	0	2	0	0	8

Sheet 6	1	2	3	4	5	6	7	8	9	10	Final
(Washington (state)) Brady Clark	0	2	0	0	0	1	0	2	0	2	7
(New York (state)) Brian Damon	1	0	0	0	0	0	2	0	1	0	4

Sheet 7	1	2	3	4	5	6	7	8	9	10	Final
(Minnesota) Kris Perkovich	1	1	0	1	0	0	0	2	0	X	5
(North Dakota) Ryan Berg	0	0	1	0	3	2	1	0	1	X	8

==== Draw 3 ====
Thursday, January 3, 8:00 am

Sheet 1	1	2	3	4	5	6	7	8	9	10	Final
(Massachusetts) Matt Mielke	0	0	0	0	0	1	0	0	1	X	2
(Minnesota) Todd Birr	0	0	2	0	1	0	0	1	0	X	4

Sheet 2	1	2	3	4	5	6	7	8	9	10	Final
(North Dakota) Owen Sampson	1	0	0	0	0	X	X	X	X	X	1
(Wisconsin) Jeremy Roe	0	4	3	2	1	X	X	X	X	X	10

Sheet 3	1	2	3	4	5	6	7	8	9	10	Final
(Minnesota) Eric Fenson	0	0	0	0	2	0	0	2	0	0	4
(Minnesota) Joseph Bonfoey	0	0	1	2	0	0	1	0	0	1	5

Sheet 4	1	2	3	4	5	6	7	8	9	10	Final
(Minnesota) Matt Stevens	0	0	1	1	0	0	0	1	0	0	3
(Alaska) Greg Persinger	1	1	0	0	1	1	1	0	1	1	7

Sheet 5	1	2	3	4	5	6	7	8	9	10	Final
(Minnesota) Evan Jensen	0	1	1	0	1	1	0	0	2	0	6
(Minnesota) Chris Dolan	1	0	0	3	0	0	2	1	0	1	8

Sheet 6	1	2	3	4	5	6	7	8	9	10	Final
(Ohio) Matt Holtwick	0	0	0	1	0	X	X	X	X	X	1
(New York (state)) Brandon Corbett	3	3	2	0	2	X	X	X	X	X	10

Sheet 7	1	2	3	4	5	6	7	8	9	10	Final
(New York (state)) Richard Dimperio	1	0	1	0	1	0	0	0	X	X	3
(Washington (state)) Steve Birkild	0	1	0	2	0	2	1	2	X	X	8

==== Draw 4 ====
Thursday, January 3, 12:00 pm

Sheet 1	1	2	3	4	5	6	7	8	9	10	Final
(Minnesota) Andy Jukich	1	0	0	0	1	0	X	X	X	X	2
(Wisconsin) Craig Brown	0	2	0	2	0	3	X	X	X	X	7

Sheet 2	1	2	3	4	5	6	7	8	9	10	Final
(Wisconsin) Derrick Casper	0	1	0	1	0	0	X	X	X	X	2
(North Dakota) Kevin Kakela	3	0	2	0	1	2	X	X	X	X	8

Sheet 3	1	2	3	4	5	6	7	8	9	10	Final
(Minnesota) Mike Farbelow	2	0	2	0	0	0	1	0	0	X	5
(Wisconsin) Ryan Lemke	0	1	0	1	1	3	0	1	1	X	8

Sheet 4	1	2	3	4	5	6	7	8	9	10	Final
(Washington (state)) Brady Clark	0	0	2	0	3	0	0	0	2	X	7
(North Dakota) Ryan Berg	0	1	0	1	0	0	0	1	0	X	3

Sheet 5	1	2	3	4	5	6	7	8	9	10	Final
(Minnesota) Tyler Runing	2	1	0	0	0	2	0	1	1	0	7
(Minnesota) Tom Scott	0	0	1	1	1	0	0	0	0	3	6

Sheet 6	1	2	3	4	5	6	7	8	9	10	Final
(Ohio) Stuart Cohen	0	1	0	1	0	0	1	0	X	X	3
(Minnesota) Peter Stolt	0	0	2	0	2	1	0	4	X	X	9

Sheet 7	1	2	3	4	5	6	7	8	9	10	Final
(New York (state)) Brian Damon	1	0	2	0	0	0	0	X	X	X	3
(Minnesota) Kris Perkovich	0	4	0	2	4	0	2	X	X	X	12

==== Draw 5 ====
Thursday, January 3, 4:00 pm

Team	1	2	3	4	5	6	7	8	9	10	Final
(Minnesota) Matt Stevens	1	0	2	1	0	2	2	0	1	X	9
(Minnesota) Jeff Puleo	0	1	0	0	2	0	0	0	0		3

Team	1	2	3	4	5	6	7	8	9	10	Final
(Minnesota) Eric Fenson	1	0	1	0	2	1	0	3	0	X	8
(Minnesota) Chris Dolan	0	1	0	2	0	0	1	0	1	X	5

Team	1	2	3	4	5	6	7	8	9	10	Final
(North Dakota) Owen Sampson	0	2	0	0	2	0	1	3	2	X	10
(New York (state)) Brandon Corbett	2	0	1	1	0	1	0	0	0	X	5

==== Draw 6 ====
Thursday, January 3, 8:00 pm

Team	1	2	3	4	5	6	7	8	9	10	Final
(Massachusetts) Matt Mielke	1	3	3	0	2	X	X	X	X	X	9
(Washington (state)) Steve Birkild	0	0	0	1	0	X	X	X	X	X	1

Team	1	2	3	4	5	6	7	8	9	10	Final
(North Dakota) Ryan Berg	4	0	3	0	0	2	0	1	0	X	10
(Minnesota) Mark Haluptzok	0	2	0	1	1	0	2	0	1	X	7

Team	1	2	3	4	5	6	7	8	9	10	Final
(Minnesota) Mike Farbelow	0	0	2	0	0	0	1	1	1	1	6
(Minnesota) Tyler Runing	2	2	0	0	2	1	0	0	0	0	7

Team	1	2	3	4	5	6	7	8	9	10	Final
(Wisconsin) Derrick Casper	0	2	0	3	0	1	0	0	X	X	6
(Minnesota) Peter Stolt	2	0	3	0	2	0	0	3	X	X	10

Team	1	2	3	4	5	6	7	8	9	10	Final
(Minnesota) Andy Jukich	0	2	0	3	0	1	0	2	0	0	8
(Minnesota) Kris Perkovich	0	0	2	0	1	0	1	0	2	1	7

==== Draw 7 ====
Friday, January 4, 9:00 am

Sheet 1	1	2	3	4	5	6	7	8	9	10	Final
(Minnesota) Todd Birr	0	3	0	0	2	0	3	0	0	0	8
(Wisconsin) Jeremy Roe	1	0	2	1	0	1	0	1	0	1	7

Sheet 2	1	2	3	4	5	6	7	8	9	10	Final
(Minnesota) Joseph Bonfoey	0	0	0	2	2	0	0	1	0	0	5
(Alaska) Greg Persinger	0	0	1	0	0	1	3	0	1	1	7

Sheet 3	1	2	3	4	5	6	7	8	9	10	Final
(Wisconsin) Craig Brown	0	2	1	0	3	1	0	1	X	X	8
(North Dakota) Kevin Kakela	1	0	0	1	0	0	1	0	X	X	3

Sheet 4	1	2	3	4	5	6	7	8	9	10	Final
(Wisconsin) Ryan Lemke	0	0	1	0	1	0	0	0	0	X	2
(Washington (state)) Brady Clark	1	2	0	1	0	0	0	0	2	X	6

Sheet 5	1	2	3	4	5	6	7	8	9	10	Final
(Minnesota) Evan Jensen	0	1	0	0	X	X	X	X	X	X	1
(Minnesota) Mike Farbelow	3	0	3	3	X	X	X	X	X	X	9

Sheet 6	1	2	3	4	5	6	7	8	9	10	Final
(Minnesota) Tom Scott	0	2	1	1	1	0	1	0	2	0	8
(Minnesota) Chris Dolan	4	0	0	0	0	1	0	1	0	1	7

Sheet 7	1	2	3	4	5	6	7	8	9	10	Final
(Ohio) Stuart Cohen	0	1	0	1	0	2	1	0	X	X	5
(New York (state)) Brandon Corbett	3	0	1	0	3	0	0	2	X	X	9

==== Draw 8 ====
Friday, January 4, 2:00 pm

Sheet 1	1	2	3	4	5	6	7	8	9	10	Final
(Minnesota) Matt Stevens	1	0	0	0	1	0	1	0	1	1	5
(Minnesota) Eric Fenson	0	0	2	1	0	1	0	2	0	0	6

Sheet 2	1	2	3	4	5	6	7	8	9	10	Final
(North Dakota) Owen Sampson	0	1	0	1	1	2	0	0	3	X	8
(Massachusetts) Matt Mielke	0	0	1	0	0	0	2	0	0	X	3

Sheet 3	1	2	3	4	5	6	7	8	9	10	Final
(North Dakota) Ryan Berg	0	2	2	0	3	1	1	X	X	X	9
(Minnesota) Tyler Runing	1	0	0	1	0	0	0	X	X	X	2

Sheet 4	1	2	3	4	5	6	7	8	9	10	Final
(Ohio) Matt Holtwick	2	0	0	3	1	1	1	X	X	X	8
(Wisconsin) Derrick Casper	0	1	2	0	0	0	0	X	X	X	3

Sheet 5	1	2	3	4	5	6	7	8	9	10	Final
(New York (state)) Richard Dimperio	0	0	1	0	0	X	X	X	X	X	1
(Minnesota) Kris Perkovich	0	1	0	5	4	X	X	X	X	X	10

Sheet 6	1	2	3	4	5	6	7	8	9	10	Final
(New York (state)) Brian Damon	0	0	1	0	0	1	1	0	X	X	3
(Washington (state)) Steve Birkild	2	1	0	2	1	0	0	3	X	X	9

Sheet 7	1	2	3	4	5	6	7	8	9	10	Final
(Minnesota) Mark Haluptzok	2	0	0	0	0	1	0	1	X	X	4
(Minnesota) Mike Farbelow	0	3	2	0	2	0	2	0	X	X	9

==== Draw 9 ====
Friday, January 4, 7:00 pm

Sheet 1	1	2	3	4	5	6	7	8	9	10	11	Final
(Minnesota) Peter Stolt	0	0	2	0	0	1	2	2	0	1	0	8
(Minnesota) Andy Jukich	1	2	0	2	0	0	0	0	3	0	1	9

Sheet 2	1	2	3	4	5	6	7	8	9	10	11	Final
(Wisconsin) Ryan Lemke	1	0	0	2	0	1	1	1	1	0	1	8
(North Dakota) Ryan Berg	0	2	1	0	3	0	0	0	0	1	0	7

Sheet 3	1	2	3	4	5	6	7	8	9	10	Final
(Wisconsin) Jeremy Roe	1	1	0	1	0	1	0	1	2	X	7
(North Dakota) Ryan Berg	0	0	1	0	2	0	1	0	0	X	4

Sheet 4	1	2	3	4	5	6	7	8	9	10	Final
(Ohio) Matt Holtwick	0	1	0	0	X	X	X	X	X	X	1
(Minnesota) Kris Perkovich	3	0	5	2	X	X	X	X	X	X	10

Sheet 5	1	2	3	4	5	6	7	8	9	10	Final
(Minnesota) Jeff Puleo	0	0	2	1	1	0	1	1	0	2	8
(Minnesota) Tom Scott	2	1	0	0	0	2	0	0	2	0	7

Sheet 6	1	2	3	4	5	6	7	8	9	10	Final
(New York (state)) Brandon Corbett	0	0	0	2	0	3	1	0	1	1	8
(Washington (state)) Steve Birkild	2	1	2	0	1	0	0	1	0	0	7

Sheet 7	1	2	3	4	5	6	7	8	9	10	Final
(Minnesota) Mike Farbelow	1	1	3	3	X	X	X	X	X	X	8
(Massachusetts) Matt Mielke	0	0	0	0	X	X	X	X	X	X	0

==== Draw 10 ====
Saturday, January 5, 9:00 am

Sheet 1	1	2	3	4	5	6	7	8	9	10	Final
(Minnesota) Todd Birr	1	0	0	0	0	2	0	1	0	X	4
(Alaska) Greg Persinger	0	2	1	1	0	0	2	0	1	X	7

Sheet 2	1	2	3	4	5	6	7	8	9	10	Final
(Wisconsin) Craig Brown	3	0	0	0	0	0	0	5	X	X	8
(Washington (state)) Brady Clark	0	0	0	1	1	1	0	0	X	X	3

Sheet 3	1	2	3	4	5	6	7	8	9	10	Final
(North Dakota) Kevin Kakela	0	1	0	0	1	0	1	0	0	0	3
(Minnesota) Eric Fenson	0	0	0	1	0	1	0	2	0	3	7

Sheet 4	1	2	3	4	5	6	7	8	9	10	Final
(Minnesota) Joseph Bonfoey	3	0	3	0	0	0	2	0	0	1	9
(Minnesota) Andy Jukich	0	1	0	2	1	0	0	0	3	0	7

Sheet 5	1	2	3	4	5	6	7	8	9	10	Final
(Minnesota) Kris Perkovich	0	1	0	0	2	0	1	0	1	X	5
(Minnesota) Matt Stevens	1	0	0	3	0	1	0	2	0	X	7

Sheet 6	1	2	3	4	5	6	7	8	9	10	Final
(Minnesota) Jeff Puleo	0	0	0	2	0	2	0	1	0	X	5
(Minnesota) Peter Stolt	1	3	1	0	1	0	1	0	1	X	8

Sheet 7	1	2	3	4	5	6	7	8	9	10	Final
(New York (state)) Brandon Corbett	0	3	0	7	X	X	X	X	X	X	10
(Minnesota) Tyler Runing	1	0	1	0	X	X	X	X	X	X	0

==== Draw 11 ====
Saturday, January 5, 2:00 pm

Team	1	2	3	4	5	6	7	8	9	10	Final
(Minnesota) Andy Jukich	0	0	0	2	0	0	X	X	X	X	2
(Minnesota) Mike Farbelow	1	0	2	0	4	1	X	X	X	X	8

Team	1	2	3	4	5	6	7	8	9	10	Final
(North Dakota) Ryan Berg	1	0	0	0	0	0	0	0	1	0	2
(Minnesota) Matt Stevens	0	0	0	0	0	1	0	1	0	3	5

Team	1	2	3	4	5	6	7	8	9	10	Final
(North Dakota) Owen Sampson	3	0	1	0	1	5	X	X	X	X	10
(Minnesota) Peter Stolt	0	0	0	1	0	0	X	X	X	X	1

Team	1	2	3	4	5	6	7	8	9	10	Final
(North Dakota) Kevin Kakela	0	1	0	1	0	1	2	1	0	0	6
(New York (state)) Brandon Corbett	1	0	2	0	1	0	0	0	3	1	8

==== Draw 12 ====
Saturday, January 5, 7:00 pm

Sheet 2	1	2	3	4	5	6	7	8	9	10	Final
(Minnesota) Eric Fenson	0	3	0	1	0	0	0	0	X	X	4
(Wisconsin) Ryan Lemke	2	0	1	0	1	1	3	1	X	X	9

Sheet 3	1	2	3	4	5	6	7	8	9	10	Final
(Wisconsin) Jeremy Roe	0	0	0	0	1	0	0	1	X	X	2
(Minnesota) Joseph Bonfoey	1	2	0	1	0	1	2	0	X	X	7

Sheet 4	1	2	3	4	5	6	7	8	9	10	Final
(Minnesota) Mike Farbelow	1	0	0	0	0	3	1	1	1	X	7
(Minnesota) Matt Stevens	0	0	0	0	2	0	0	0	0	X	2

Sheet 5	1	2	3	4	5	6	7	8	9	10	Final
(North Dakota) Owen Sampson	4	0	0	0	1	0	3	0	0	1	9
(New York (state)) Brandon Corbett	0	1	2	1	0	1	0	2	1	0	8

==== Draw 13 ====
Sunday, January 6, 9:00 am

Sheet 2	1	2	3	4	5	6	7	8	9	10	Final
(Wisconsin) Ryan Lemke	4	0	4	0	X	X	X	X	X	X	8
(Minnesota) Todd Birr	0	1	0	2	X	X	X	X	X	X	3

Sheet 3	1	2	3	4	5	6	7	8	9	10	Final
(Minnesota) Joseph Bonfoey	0	0	0	1	0	0	1	0	X	X	2
(Washington (state)) Brady Clark	0	2	2	0	1	2	0	2	X	X	9

Sheet 4	1	2	3	4	5	6	7	8	9	10	Final
(Minnesota) Mike Farbelow	0	1	0	2	0	2	1	3	X	X	9
(Minnesota) Eric Fenson	1	0	1	0	1	0	0	0	X	X	3

Sheet 5	1	2	3	4	5	6	7	8	9	10	Final
(North Dakota) Owen Sampson	0	1	1	0	0	3	0	4	X	X	9
(Wisconsin) Jeremy Roe	1	0	0	2	0	0	1	0	X	X	4

==== Draw 14 ====
Sunday, January 6, 2:00 pm

Sheet 3	1	2	3	4	5	6	7	8	9	10	11	Final
(Minnesota) Joseph Bonfoey	0	1	0	1	1	0	1	0	1	1	0	6
(Minnesota) Mike Farbelow	2	0	1	0	0	2	0	1	0	0	1	7

Sheet 4	1	2	3	4	5	6	7	8	9	10	Final
(Minnesota) Todd Birr	0	1	1	0	1	0	2	0	1	1	7
(North Dakota) Owen Sampson	2	0	0	1	0	1	0	2	0	0	6
