= 2012 United States Men's Curling Championship =

- Host city: Philadelphia, Pennsylvania
- Arena: IceWorks Skating Complex
- Dates: February 11–18, 2012
- Winner: (New York (state)) Heath McCormick
- Curling club: Ardlsey CC, Irvington, New York
- Skip: Heath McCormick
- Third: Bill Stopera
- Second: Martin Sather
- Lead: Dean Gemmell
- Finalist: (Minnesota) Pete Fenson

The 2012 United States Men's Curling Championship took place from February 11 to 18 at the IceWorks Skating Complex in Aston, Pennsylvania, (with the host city being listed as Philadelphia). It was held in conjunction with the 2012 United States Women's Curling Championship. The winning team, skipped by Heath McCormick, represented the United States at the 2012 Capital One World Men's Curling Championship in Basel, Switzerland. The first and second placed teams, skipped respectively by Heath McCormick and Pete Fenson, earned qualification spots to the 2014 United States Olympic Curling Trials, which will determine the teams that will represent the United States at the 2014 Winter Olympics.

== Road to the Nationals ==
As with last year, teams qualified for the men's nationals by qualifying automatically through the World Curling Tour Order of Merit, through regional qualifiers, or through a challenge round. Two teams qualified via the Order of Merit, five teams qualified through the regional qualifiers, and the remaining three teams qualified through the challenge round. The regional qualifiers in Green Bay, Seattle, Grand Forks, and Laurel each received one or more qualifying spots, which were awarded to the top finishers from the qualifiers. Teams that were not awarded a qualification spot but were top finishers were invited to the challenge round, where the top three teams qualified.

The Pete Fenson rink stood as an exception to the preceding rules. Since Fenson and his team were scheduled to represent the United States in the 2012 USA-Brazil Challenge, which was cancelled, they received an automatic berth into the nationals, regardless of their Order of Merit standing. Because they were not one of the top two Order of Merit teams, the Fenson rink participated as the eleventh team in the nationals.

== Teams ==
Eleven teams participated in the national championship, one more team than usual, due to the Fenson rink's scheduled participation in the USA-Brazil Challenge. The teams are listed as follows:

Skip	Third	Second	Lead	Alternate	Locale	Qualification Method
Pete Fenson	Shawn Rojeski	Joe Polo	Ryan Brunt		Bemidji, Minnesota	Special Exemption
Tyler George	Christopher Plys	Rich Ruohonen	Colin Hufman		Duluth, Minnesota	Order of Merit
Craig Brown	Kroy Nernberger	Matt Hamilton	Derrick Casper		Madison, Wisconsin	Order of Merit
Heath McCormick	Bill Stopera	Martin Sather	Dean Gemmell		(New York (state)) New York, New York	Laurel Qualifier
Brady Clark	Darren Lehto	Leon Romaniuk	Steve Lundeen	Wes Johnson	(Washington (state)) Seattle, Washington	Seattle Qualifier
John Shuster	Zach Jacobson	Jared Zezel	John Landsteiner		Duluth, Minnesota	Grand Forks Qualifier
Owen Sampson	Ned Sampson	Tucker Smith	Kyle Young		Edmore, North Dakota	Grand Forks Qualifier
Blake Morton	Marcus Fonger	Tommy Juszczyk	Calvin Weber		McFarland, Wisconsin	Green Bay Qualifier
Eric Fenson	Trevor Andrews	Quentin Way	Mark Lazar		Bemidji, Minnesota	Challenge Round
Mike Farbelow	Kevin Deeren	Kraig Deeren	Tim Solin		Minneapolis, Minnesota	Challenge Round
Todd Birr	Greg Romaniuk	Doug Pottinger	Thomas O'Connor	Kevin Birr	Mankato, Minnesota	Challenge Round

== Round-robin standings ==
Final round-robin standings

Skip	W	L	PF	PA	Ends Won	Ends Lost	Blank Ends	Stolen Ends
(New York (state)) Heath McCormick	10	0	82	52	52	34	4	24
(Minnesota) Pete Fenson	9	1	73	39	43	34	8	11
(Wisconsin) Craig Brown	7	3	76	55	45	38	8	11
(Minnesota) John Shuster	6	4	75	57	45	41	6	13
(Washington (state)) Brady Clark	5	5	62	66	39	45	12	9
(Minnesota) Todd Birr	4	6	68	74	43	48	7	5
(Minnesota) Tyler George	4	6	68	65	43	42	6	11
(Minnesota) Mike Farbelow	4	6	52	66	37	42	9	5
(Minnesota) Eric Fenson	3	7	47	66	32	43	9	7
(North Dakota) Owen Sampson	2	7	48	70	39	42	7	12
(Wisconsin) Blake Morton	1	9	42	73	36	46	6	12

== Round-robin results ==
All times listed in Eastern Standard Time.

=== Draw 1 ===
Saturday, February 11, 8:30 pm

Sheet A	1	2	3	4	5	6	7	8	9	10	Final
(Minnesota) Todd Birr 🔨	2	0	0	1	0	1	1	0	1	0	6
(Minnesota) John Shuster	0	2	1	0	4	0	0	0	0	2	9

Sheet B	1	2	3	4	5	6	7	8	9	10	Final
(Wisconsin) Blake Morton	0	1	0	0	0	1	0	X	X	X	2
(Minnesota) Tyler George 🔨	3	0	2	1	1	0	2	X	X	X	9

Sheet C	1	2	3	4	5	6	7	8	9	10	Final
(Washington (state)) Brady Clark	0	0	1	1	0	0	2	0	2	0	6
(Wisconsin) Craig Brown 🔨	2	0	0	0	0	3	0	1	0	2	8

Sheet D	1	2	3	4	5	6	7	8	9	10	Final
(Minnesota) Pete Fenson 🔨	3	1	0	2	1	0	2	X	X	X	9
(Minnesota) Eric Fenson	0	0	2	0	0	1	0	X	X	X	3

Sheet E	1	2	3	4	5	6	7	8	9	10	Final
(New York (state)) Heath McCormick 🔨	0	2	1	1	2	0	3	X	X	X	9
(Minnesota) Mike Farbelow	1	0	0	0	0	1	0	X	X	X	2

=== Draw 2 ===
Sunday, February 12, 12:00 pm

Sheet A	1	2	3	4	5	6	7	8	9	10	Final
(Wisconsin) Blake Morton	0	0	1	0	1	0	0	2	0	X	4
(Wisconsin) Craig Brown 🔨	1	1	0	2	0	1	2	0	1	X	8

Sheet B	1	2	3	4	5	6	7	8	9	10	Final
(Minnesota) Mike Farbelow	0	0	1	1	0	0	0	2	0	2	6
(Minnesota) Todd Birr 🔨	0	2	0	0	0	0	1	0	1	0	4

Sheet C	1	2	3	4	5	6	7	8	9	10	Final
(North Dakota) Owen Sampson	0	2	0	2	1	0	1	0	3	X	9
(Minnesota) Tyler George 🔨	2	0	1	0	0	1	0	1	0	X	5

Sheet D	1	2	3	4	5	6	7	8	9	10	Final
(Minnesota) John Shuster	0	1	0	0	1	0	2	0	2	0	6
(New York (state)) Heath McCormick 🔨	1	0	2	2	0	1	0	1	0	1	8

Sheet E	1	2	3	4	5	6	7	8	9	10	Final
(Minnesota) Pete Fenson	0	1	1	0	2	0	2	1	X	X	7
(Washington (state)) Brady Clark 🔨	0	0	0	1	0	1	0	0	X	X	2

=== Draw 3 ===
Sunday, February 12, 8:00 pm

Sheet A	1	2	3	4	5	6	7	8	9	10	Final
(Minnesota) Tyler George 🔨	3	0	0	0	1	1	0	1	0	0	6
(New York (state)) Heath McCormick	0	2	1	1	0	0	2	0	0	1	7

Sheet B	1	2	3	4	5	6	7	8	9	10	Final
(Minnesota) Pete Fenson	1	0	0	0	4	0	0	0	2	X	7
(Wisconsin) Blake Morton 🔨	0	0	1	0	0	1	1	1	0	X	4

Sheet C	1	2	3	4	5	6	7	8	9	10	Final
(Minnesota) John Shuster	0	2	1	1	0	2	1	0	3	X	10
(Minnesota) Mike Farbelow 🔨	1	0	0	0	1	0	0	1	0	X	3

Sheet D	1	2	3	4	5	6	7	8	9	10	Final
(North Dakota) Owen Sampson	0	1	0	1	0	0	0	1	X	X	3
(Wisconsin) Craig Brown 🔨	4	0	1	0	1	1	1	0	X	X	8

Sheet E	1	2	3	4	5	6	7	8	9	10	Final
(Minnesota) Todd Birr	0	1	1	0	1	0	0	1	0	0	4
(Minnesota) Eric Fenson 🔨	1	0	0	1	0	1	1	0	0	2	6

=== Draw 4 ===
Monday, February 13, 12:00 pm

Sheet A	1	2	3	4	5	6	7	8	9	10	Final
(Minnesota) John Shuster	1	2	0	1	0	0	0	1	0	0	5
(Minnesota) Pete Fenson 🔨	0	0	1	0	2	0	1	0	1	3	8

Sheet B	1	2	3	4	5	6	7	8	9	10	Final
(Wisconsin) Craig Brown	0	0	3	0	2	0	0	1	0	2	8
(Minnesota) Mike Farbelow 🔨	0	2	0	1	0	1	1	0	2	0	7

Sheet C	1	2	3	4	5	6	7	8	9	10	Final
(Wisconsin) Blake Morton	0	0	1	0	0	0	1	0	1	1	4
(Minnesota) Eric Fenson 🔨	0	1	0	1	2	0	0	1	0	0	5

Sheet D	1	2	3	4	5	6	7	8	9	10	Final
(Washington (state)) Brady Clark 🔨	0	1	0	0	0	3	1	1	X	X	5
(Minnesota) Tyler George	1	0	3	1	2	0	2	0	X	X	9

Sheet E	1	2	3	4	5	6	7	8	9	10	Final
(North Dakota) Owen Sampson	0	0	0	1	0	0	1	0	1	X	3
(New York (state)) Heath McCormick 🔨	2	1	0	0	1	2	0	1	0	X	7

=== Draw 5 ===
Monday, February 13, 8:00 pm

Sheet A	1	2	3	4	5	6	7	8	9	10	Final
(North Dakota) Owen Sampson	0	1	0	2	1	1	0	0	1	0	6
(Minnesota) Todd Birr 🔨	2	0	3	0	0	0	0	2	0	3	10

Sheet B	1	2	3	4	5	6	7	8	9	10	Final
(Washington (state)) Brady Clark 🔨	0	1	0	1	0	1	2	0	0	0	5
(Minnesota) John Shuster	1	0	1	0	2	0	0	3	1	1	9

Sheet C	1	2	3	4	5	6	7	8	9	10	Final
(New York (state)) Heath McCormick	0	2	2	0	0	1	0	1	0	1	7
(Minnesota) Pete Fenson 🔨	1	0	0	3	0	0	2	0	0	0	6

Sheet D	1	2	3	4	5	6	7	8	9	10	Final
(Minnesota) Mike Farbelow 🔨	2	1	0	3	0	3	0	1	X	X	10
(Wisconsin) Blake Morton	0	0	3	0	2	0	0	0	X	X	5

Sheet E	1	2	3	4	5	6	7	8	9	10	Final
(Minnesota) Eric Fenson 🔨	1	0	3	0	0	1	0	0	X	X	5
(Wisconsin) Craig Brown	0	3	0	1	2	0	3	2	X	X	11

=== Draw 6 ===
Tuesday, February 14, 8:00 am

Sheet A	1	2	3	4	5	6	7	8	9	10	Final
(New York (state)) Heath McCormick	1	1	1	3	0	1	0	0	0	1	8
(Washington (state)) Brady Clark 🔨	0	0	0	0	3	0	1	1	1	0	6

Sheet B	1	2	3	4	5	6	7	8	9	10	Final
(Minnesota) Tyler George 🔨	4	0	1	4	0	0	0	2	X	X	11
(Minnesota) Eric Fenson	0	1	0	0	2	0	1	0	X	X	4

Sheet C	1	2	3	4	5	6	7	8	9	10	Final
(Minnesota) Mike Farbelow 🔨	2	0	0	2	0	1	0	1	0	2	8
(North Dakota) Owen Sampson	0	1	2	0	1	0	1	0	1	0	6

Sheet D	1	2	3	4	5	6	7	8	9	10	Final
(Minnesota) Todd Birr 🔨	1	0	1	0	1	0	1	0	X	X	4
(Minnesota) Pete Fenson	0	2	0	1	0	4	0	2	X	X	9

Sheet E	1	2	3	4	5	6	7	8	9	10	Final
(Minnesota) John Shuster 🔨	0	2	1	0	1	1	0	2	X	X	7
(Wisconsin) Blake Morton	0	0	0	0	0	0	1	0	X	X	1

=== Draw 7 ===
Tuesday, February 14, 4:00 pm

Sheet A	1	2	3	4	5	6	7	8	9	10	Final
(Minnesota) Mike Farbelow	0	0	1	1	0	1	0	0	X	X	3
(Minnesota) Eric Fenson 🔨	3	1	0	0	1	0	4	1	X	X	10

Sheet B	1	2	3	4	5	6	7	8	9	10	Final
(Minnesota) Pete Fenson	0	0	1	0	1	0	2	1	1	X	6
(Wisconsin) Craig Brown 🔨	1	0	0	1	0	1	0	0	0	X	3

Sheet C	1	2	3	4	5	6	7	8	9	10	Final
(Minnesota) Todd Birr 🔨	0	1	2	0	0	2	0	2	0	1	8
(Wisconsin) Blake Morton	1	0	0	1	1	0	1	0	1	0	5

Sheet D	1	2	3	4	5	6	7	8	9	10	Final
(Minnesota) Tyler George	1	0	3	0	3	0	1	1	0	0	9
(Minnesota) John Shuster 🔨	0	1	0	1	0	3	0	0	2	1	8

Sheet E	1	2	3	4	5	6	7	8	9	10	11	Final
(Washington (state)) Brady Clark	0	0	0	0	3	0	2	0	0	0	2	7
(North Dakota) Owen Sampson 🔨	0	1	0	0	0	1	0	1	1	1	0	5

=== Draw 8 ===
Wednesday, February 15, 8:00 am

Sheet A	1	2	3	4	5	6	7	8	9	10	Final
(Minnesota) John Shuster 🔨	2	1	0	2	1	0	2	0	X	X	8
(North Dakota) Owen Sampson	0	0	1	0	0	1	0	1	X	X	3

Sheet B	1	2	3	4	5	6	7	8	9	10	Final
(Wisconsin) Blake Morton	0	0	0	1	0	1	0	2	1	1	6
(New York (state)) Heath McCormick 🔨	2	0	1	0	2	0	2	0	0	0	7

Sheet C	1	2	3	4	5	6	7	8	9	10	Final
(Minnesota) Eric Fenson 🔨	0	2	1	0	0	0	0	0	3	0	6
(Washington (state)) Brady Clark	1	0	0	3	1	0	1	0	0	3	9

Sheet D	1	2	3	4	5	6	7	8	9	10	Final
(Wisconsin) Craig Brown	1	0	0	1	0	0	1	0	2	0	5
(Minnesota) Todd Birr 🔨	0	1	0	0	3	0	0	2	0	1	7

Sheet E	1	2	3	4	5	6	7	8	9	10	Final
(Minnesota) Mike Farbelow 🔨	2	0	0	1	0	2	0	1	0	X	6
(Minnesota) Tyler George	0	1	1	0	1	0	0	0	0	X	3

=== Draw 9 ===
Wednesday, February 15, 4:00 pm

Sheet A	1	2	3	4	5	6	7	8	9	10	Final
(Minnesota) Pete Fenson	0	0	1	0	3	0	1	0	1	2	8
(Minnesota) Mike Farbelow 🔨	0	2	0	1	0	1	0	0	0	0	4

Sheet B	1	2	3	4	5	6	7	8	9	10	Final
(Minnesota) Eric Fenson 🔨	0	1	0	1	0	0	0	2	0	0	4
(North Dakota) Owen Sampson	0	0	0	0	2	1	1	0	1	1	6

Sheet C	1	2	3	4	5	6	7	8	9	10	11	Final
(Minnesota) Tyler George	0	2	1	0	1	2	0	1	0	1	0	8
(Minnesota) Todd Birr 🔨	2	0	0	2	0	0	2	0	2	0	2	10

Sheet D	1	2	3	4	5	6	7	8	9	10	Final
(Wisconsin) Blake Morton	0	0	1	0	1	0	0	2	1	0	5
(Washington (state)) Brady Clark 🔨	0	2	0	2	0	2	1	0	0	1	8

Sheet E	1	2	3	4	5	6	7	8	9	10	Final
(Wisconsin) Craig Brown 🔨	0	2	0	0	2	1	0	0	2	0	7
(New York (state)) Heath McCormick	0	0	2	1	0	0	3	1	0	1	8

=== Draw 10 ===
Thursday, February 16, 8:00 am

Sheet A	1	2	3	4	5	6	7	8	9	10	Final
(North Dakota) Owen Sampson	0	0	0	0	0	2	1	1	0	X	4
(Wisconsin) Blake Morton 🔨	1	1	1	1	1	0	0	0	1	X	6

Sheet B	1	2	3	4	5	6	7	8	9	10	Final
(Minnesota) Todd Birr	0	0	1	0	2	0	2	0	1	X	6
(Washington (state)) Brady Clark 🔨	1	2	0	2	0	2	0	1	0	X	8

Sheet C	1	2	3	4	5	6	7	8	9	10	Final
(Wisconsin) Craig Brown 🔨	2	0	0	2	0	2	0	1	3	X	10
(Minnesota) John Shuster	0	1	0	0	2	0	2	0	0	X	5

Sheet D	1	2	3	4	5	6	7	8	9	10	Final
(New York (state)) Heath McCormick 🔨	2	1	1	3	2	X	X	X	X	X	9
(Minnesota) Eric Fenson	0	0	0	0	0	X	X	X	X	X	0

Sheet E	1	2	3	4	5	6	7	8	9	10	Final
(Minnesota) Tyler George	0	1	0	1	0	0	0	1	1	0	4
(Minnesota) Pete Fenson 🔨	1	0	1	0	0	1	1	0	0	2	6

=== Draw 11 ===
Thursday, February 16, 12:00 pm

Sheet A	1	2	3	4	5	6	7	8	9	10	Final
(Wisconsin) Craig Brown 🔨	2	0	1	0	1	0	2	0	2	X	8
(Minnesota) Tyler George	0	1	0	0	0	1	0	2	0	X	4

Sheet B	1	2	3	4	5	6	7	8	9	10	Final
(North Dakota) Owen Sampson 🔨	0	0	2	1	0	X	X	X	X	X	3
(Minnesota) Pete Fenson	3	1	0	0	3	X	X	X	X	X	7

Sheet C	1	2	3	4	5	6	7	8	9	10	11	Final
(Minnesota) Todd Birr 🔨	0	2	0	0	0	2	1	0	3	1	0	9
(New York (state)) Heath McCormick	2	0	4	1	1	0	0	1	0	0	3	12

Sheet D	1	2	3	4	5	6	7	8	9	10	Final
(Washington (state)) Brady Clark	0	0	1	0	2	0	0	2	0	1	6
(Minnesota) Mike Farbelow 🔨	0	0	0	1	0	1	0	0	1	0	3

Sheet E	1	2	3	4	5	6	7	8	9	10	Final
(Minnesota) Eric Fenson 🔨	0	1	0	0	1	0	1	0	1	X	4
(Minnesota) John Shuster	2	0	0	2	0	0	0	2	0	X	6

== Playoffs ==
Page playoff system
1	(New York (state)) Heath McCormick	5
2	(Minnesota) Pete Fenson	4
3	(Wisconsin) Craig Brown	5
4	(Minnesota) John Shuster	7

Semifinal
2	(Minnesota) Pete Fenson	8
4	(Minnesota) John Shuster	5

Final
1	(New York (state)) Heath McCormick	5
2	(Minnesota) Pete Fenson	4

=== 1 vs. 2 game ===
Friday, February 17, 12:00 pm

Team	1	2	3	4	5	6	7	8	9	10	Final
(New York (state)) Heath McCormick 🔨	1	1	0	0	0	1	0	0	0	2	5
(Minnesota) Pete Fenson	0	0	1	1	0	0	1	1	0	0	4

Player Percentages
(New York (state)) Heath McCormick		(Minnesota) Pete Fenson	
Dean Gemmell	83%	Ryan Brunt	84%
Martin Sather	83%	Joe Polo	88%
Bill Stopera	71%	Shawn Rojeski	67%
Heath McCormick	82%	Pete Fenson	76%
Total	80%	Total	79%

=== 3 vs. 4 game ===
Friday, February 17, 12:00 pm

Team	1	2	3	4	5	6	7	8	9	10	Final
(Wisconsin) Craig Brown 🔨	0	2	0	0	1	0	1	1	0	0	5
(Minnesota) John Shuster	0	0	1	1	0	2	0	0	1	2	7

Player Percentages
(Wisconsin) Craig Brown		(Minnesota) John Shuster	
Derrick Casper	90%	John Landsteiner	90%
Matt Hamilton	81%	Jared Zezel	73%
Kroy Nernberger	62%	Zach Jacobson	84%
Craig Brown	80%	John Shuster	85%
Total	78%	Total	83%

=== Semifinal ===
Friday, February 17, 8:00 pm

Team	1	2	3	4	5	6	7	8	9	10	Final
(Minnesota) Pete Fenson 🔨	1	0	0	2	0	0	1	1	0	3	8
(Minnesota) John Shuster	0	0	2	0	0	2	0	0	1	0	5

Player Percentages
(Minnesota) Pete Fenson		(Minnesota) John Shuster	
Ryan Brunt	78%	John Landsteiner	85%
Joe Polo	82%	Jared Zezel	89%
Shawn Rojeski	69%	Zach Jacobson	76%
Pete Fenson	82%	John Shuster	77%
Total	78%	Total	82%

=== Championship final ===
Saturday, February 18, 3:00 pm

Team	1	2	3	4	5	6	7	8	9	10	Final
(New York (state)) Heath McCormick 🔨	2	0	0	1	1	0	0	0	0	1	5
(Minnesota) Pete Fenson	0	2	0	0	0	0	1	0	1	0	4

Player Percentages
(New York (state)) Heath McCormick		(Minnesota) Pete Fenson	
Dean Gemmell	78%	Ryan Brunt	71%
Martin Sather	83%	Joe Polo	89%
Bill Stopera	73%	Shawn Rojeski	82%
Heath McCormick	74%	Pete Fenson	73%
Total	77%	Total	79%
