= 2014 United States Men's Curling Championship – Qualification =

Qualification for the 2014 United States Men's Curling Championship consisted of three different paths. Four teams qualified directly through the High Performance Program or the Order of Merit system. The number of the remaining entrants to the national championships was cut down to six teams through a challenge round held in early January.

== Qualification system ==
Teams can qualify to participate in the men's national championship through the High Performance Program, through the World Curling Tour Order of Merit, or through a challenge round.

Two spots in the nationals were awarded to two teams on the United States Curling Association's High Performance National Program. The teams qualified through the High Performance Program were those skipped by John Shuster and Pete Fenson. Two more spots were awarded to the top two men's teams on the World Curling Tour Order of Merit standings table at the year's end. The teams qualified through the Order of Merit were those skipped by Heath McCormick and Brady Clark.

The remaining six spots in the nationals will be awarded to the teams that earn qualification spots through the challenge round. The challenge round will be held in a triple knockout format.

== Challenge round ==
The challenge round for the men's nationals will be held from January 9 to 12 at the Four Seasons Curling Club in Blaine, Minnesota.

=== Teams ===
Skip	Third	Second	Lead	Locale
Kent Beadle	Dave Jensen	Richard Maskel	Roger Smith	St. Paul, Minnesota
Ryan Berg	Tyler Runing	Evan Workin	Jordan Brown	West Fargo, North Dakota
Todd Birr	Doug Pottinger	Tom O'Connor	Troy Schroeder	Blaine, Minnesota
Chris Bond	Matt Birkild	Benj Guzman	Rob Corn	(Washington (state)) Seattle, Washington
Joseph Bonfoey	Ted Trolson	Paul Lyttle	Harold Rutan	Duluth, Minnesota
Craig Brown	Kroy Nernberger	Matt Hamilton	Jon Brunt	Madison, Wisconsin
Stephen Dropkin	Evan Jensen	Steve Scheffler	Michael Graziano	St. Paul, Minnesota
Mike Farbelow	Kevin Deeren	Kraig Deeren	Mark Lazar	St. Paul, Minnesota
Eric Fenson	Josh Bahr	Jon Chandler	Mark Haluptzok	Bemidji, Minnesota
Sam Galey	Andrew Ernst	Mac Guy	Jeremy Dinsel	(Washington (state)) Seattle, Washington
Tyler George	Bill Stopera	Martin Sather	Dean Gemmell	Duluth, Minnesota
Dale Gibbs	Eric Schultz	Perry Tholl	Matt Fowler	St. Paul, Minnesota
Kevin Kakela	Kyle Kakela	Ryan Lagasse	Todd Ussatis	Rolla, North Dakota
Alex Leichter	Brandon Corbett	Derek Corbett	Jeff Pulli	(New York (state)) Rochester, New York
Ryan Lemke	Nathan Gebert	Ash Nelson	Casey Konopacky	Medford, Wisconsin
John Lilla	Aaron Nunberg	Bryan Hanson	Joel Cooper	St. Paul, Minnesota
Lionel Locke	George Allendorph	Nathan Chilson	Michael Vosberg	St. Paul, Minnesota
Owen Sampson	Tucker Smith	Ned Sampson	Cooper Smith	Fargo, North Dakota
Peter Stolt	Brad Caldwell	Erik Ordway	Clayton Orvik	Plymouth, Minnesota
Mark Willmert	Chris Dolan	Tim Jeanetta	Brian Sparstad	St. Paul, Minnesota

=== Knockout draw brackets ===
==== A Event ====
First Knockout
(Washington (state)) Chris Bond	5
(Minnesota) Kent Beadle	8
(Minnesota) Joseph Bonfoey	9
(Minnesota) Lionel Locke	4

Quarterfinals
(Wisconsin) Ryan Lemke	8
(North Dakota) Kevin Kakela	0
(Minnesota) Kent Beadle	5
(Minnesota) Tyler George	7
(New York (state)) Alex Leichter	8
(North Dakota) Owen Sampson	7
(Minnesota) Joseph Bonfoey	8
(Minnesota) Mike Farbelow	3

Semifinals
(Wisconsin) Ryan Lemke	5
(Minnesota) Tyler George	8
(New York (state)) Alex Leichter	2
(Minnesota) Joseph Bonfoey	3

Qualifier 1
(Minnesota) Tyler George	5
(Minnesota) Joseph Bonfoey	9

First Knockout
(Minnesota) Mark Willmert	8
(Wisconsin) Dale Gibbs	4
(North Dakota) Ryan Berg	9
(Washington (state)) Sam Galey	6

Quarterfinals
(Minnesota) Stephen Dropkin	9
(Minnesota) Eric Fenson	2
(Minnesota) Mark Willmert	5
(Wisconsin) Craig Brown	8
(Minnesota) John Lilla	3
(Minnesota) Peter Stolt	7
(North Dakota) Ryan Berg	2
(Minnesota) Todd Birr	8

Semifinals
(Minnesota) Stephen Dropkin	1
(Wisconsin) Craig Brown	9
(Minnesota) Peter Stolt	5
(Minnesota) Todd Birr	9

Qualifier 2
(Wisconsin) Craig Brown	6
(Minnesota) Todd Birr	0

==== B Event ====
Second Knockout
(North Dakota) Owen Sampson	10
(Washington (state)) Chris Bond	6
(North Dakota) Kevin Kakela	7
(Minnesota) Lionel Locke	8

Quarterfinals
(Minnesota) Mike Farbelow	7
(North Dakota) Owen Sampson	2
(Minnesota) Kent Beadle	8
(Minnesota) Lionel Locke	6

Semifinals
(Minnesota) Stephen Dropkin	6
(Minnesota) Mike Farbelow	5
(Minnesota) Peter Stolt	8
(Minnesota) Kent Beadle	4

To Qualifier 3
(Minnesota) Stephen Dropkin	7
(Minnesota) Peter Stolt	8
Qualifier 3
(Minnesota) Peter Stolt	4
(Minnesota) Tyler George	8

Second Knockout
(Minnesota) John Lilla	6
(Wisconsin) Dale Gibbs	5
(Minnesota) Eric Fenson	8
(Washington (state)) Sam Galey	7

Quarterfinals
(North Dakota) Ryan Berg	11
(Minnesota) John Lilla	5
(Minnesota) Mark Willmert	5
(Minnesota) Eric Fenson	8

Semifinals
(Wisconsin) Ryan Lemke	7
(North Dakota) Ryan Berg	4
(New York (state)) Alex Leichter	7
(Minnesota) Eric Fenson	6

To Qualifier 4
(Wisconsin) Ryan Lemke	6
(New York (state)) Alex Leichter	7
Qualifier 4
(New York (state)) Alex Leichter	8
(Minnesota) Todd Birr	6

==== C Event ====
Third Knockout
(Wisconsin) Dale Gibbs	8
(Minnesota) Lionel Locke	6
(Washington (state)) Sam Galey	4
(North Dakota) Owen Sampson	9

Quarterfinals
(Minnesota) Eric Fenson	11
(Wisconsin) Dale Gibbs	5
(North Dakota) Ryan Berg	3
(North Dakota) Owen Sampson	6

Semifinals
(Minnesota) Eric Fenson	8
(North Dakota) Owen Sampson	6

To Qualifier 5
(Minnesota) Eric Fenson	6
(Minnesota) Stephen Dropkin	5
Qualifier 5
(Minnesota) Eric Fenson	10
(Minnesota) Todd Birr	9

Third Knockout
(Washington (state)) Chris Bond	8
(Minnesota) Mark Willmert	6
(North Dakota) Kevin Kakela	3
(Minnesota) John Lilla	9

Quarterfinals
(Minnesota) Kent Beadle	11
(Washington (state)) Chris Bond	9
(Minnesota) Mike Farbelow	7
(Minnesota) John Lilla	6

Semifinals
(Minnesota) Kent Beadle	5
(Minnesota) Mike Farbelow	8

To Qualifier 6
(Minnesota) Mike Farbelow	7
(Wisconsin) Ryan Lemke	5
Qualifier 6
(Minnesota) Mike Farbelow	6
(Minnesota) Peter Stolt	12

=== Knockout results ===
==== Draw 1 ====
Thursday, January 9, 7:00 pm

Team	1	2	3	4	5	6	7	8	9	10	Final
(Washington (state)) Chris Bond	0	0	2	0	3	0	0	0	0	X	5
(Minnesota) Kent Beadle 🔨	2	1	0	3	0	0	0	1	1	X	8

Team	1	2	3	4	5	6	7	8	9	10	Final
(Minnesota) Joseph Bonfoey	0	3	0	0	4	0	2	0	X	X	9
(Minnesota) Lionel Locke	0	0	1	0	0	2	0	1	X	X	4

Team	1	2	3	4	5	6	7	8	9	10	Final
(Minnesota) Mark Willmert	0	5	0	0	0	1	0	0	2	X	8
(Wisconsin) Dale Gibbs	1	0	1	0	0	0	2	0	0	X	4

Team	1	2	3	4	5	6	7	8	9	10	Final
(North Dakota) Ryan Berg	0	1	0	0	2	1	3	0	2	X	9
(Washington (state)) Sam Galey 🔨	1	0	1	2	0	0	0	2	0	X	6

Team	1	2	3	4	5	6	7	8	9	10	Final
(Wisconsin) Ryan Lemke 🔨	0	2	3	3	X	X	X	X	X	X	8
(North Dakota) Kevin Kakela	0	0	0	0	X	X	X	X	X	X	0

Team	1	2	3	4	5	6	7	8	9	10	11	Final
(New York (state)) Alex Leichter 🔨	1	0	2	0	0	1	1	0	2	0	1	8
(North Dakota) Owen Sampson	0	2	0	0	2	0	0	2	0	1	0	7

==== Draw 2 ====
Friday, January 10, 9:00 am

Team	1	2	3	4	5	6	7	8	9	10	Final
(Minnesota) Kent Beadle 🔨	0	1	0	0	0	0	3	0	1	X	5
(Minnesota) Tyler George	1	0	1	2	1	0	0	2	0	X	7

Team	1	2	3	4	5	6	7	8	9	10	Final
(Minnesota) Joseph Bonfoey	1	0	0	3	0	2	1	1	X	X	8
(Minnesota) Mike Farbelow 🔨	0	1	1	0	1	0	0	0	X	X	3

Team	1	2	3	4	5	6	7	8	9	10	Final
(Minnesota) Stephen Dropkin	2	0	3	4	0	X	X	X	X	X	9
(Minnesota) Eric Fenson 🔨	0	1	0	0	1	X	X	X	X	X	2

Team	1	2	3	4	5	6	7	8	9	10	Final
(Minnesota) Mark Willmert 🔨	1	0	0	0	1	0	2	0	1	X	5
(Wisconsin) Craig Brown	0	3	0	0	0	4	0	1	0	X	8

Team	1	2	3	4	5	6	7	8	9	10	Final
(Minnesota) John Lilla	1	0	1	0	1	0	0	0	0	X	3
(Minnesota) Peter Stolt 🔨	0	0	0	5	0	0	0	0	2	X	7

Team	1	2	3	4	5	6	7	8	9	10	Final
(North Dakota) Ryan Berg 🔨	0	0	0	0	2	0	X	X	X	X	2
(Minnesota) Todd Birr	2	1	1	1	0	3	X	X	X	X	8

==== Draw 3 ====
Friday, January 10, 2:00 pm

Team	1	2	3	4	5	6	7	8	9	10	Final
(Wisconsin) Ryan Lemke	0	1	1	2	0	0	1	0	0	X	5
(Minnesota) Tyler George 🔨	1	0	0	0	1	1	0	2	3	X	8

Team	1	2	3	4	5	6	7	8	9	10	Final
(New York (state)) Alex Leichter	0	0	1	0	0	0	0	1	0	X	2
(Minnesota) Joseph Bonfoey 🔨	1	0	0	0	1	0	1	0	0	X	3

Team	1	2	3	4	5	6	7	8	9	10	Final
(North Dakota) Owen Sampson 🔨	0	3	0	4	0	0	0	3	X	X	10
(Washington (state)) Chris Bond	1	0	2	0	1	1	1	0	X	X	6

Team	1	2	3	4	5	6	7	8	9	10	11	Final
(North Dakota) Kevin Kakela 🔨	1	3	1	0	1	0	0	0	1	0	0	7
(Minnesota) Lionel Locke	0	0	0	1	0	2	1	1	0	2	1	8

Team	1	2	3	4	5	6	7	8	9	10	Final
(Minnesota) John Lilla 🔨	1	0	0	3	0	0	1	0	0	1	6
(Wisconsin) Dale Gibbs	0	1	1	0	0	1	0	1	1	0	5

Team	1	2	3	4	5	6	7	8	9	10	Final
(Minnesota) Eric Fenson	0	2	0	2	0	2	1	1	0	0	8
(Washington (state)) Sam Galey 🔨	2	0	2	0	2	0	0	0	0	1	7

==== Draw 4 ====
Friday, January 10, 7:00 pm

Team	1	2	3	4	5	6	7	8	9	10	Final
(Minnesota) Stephen Dropkin 🔨	0	1	0	0	X	X	X	X	X	X	1
(Wisconsin) Craig Brown	1	0	6	2	X	X	X	X	X	X	9

Team	1	2	3	4	5	6	7	8	9	10	Final
(Minnesota) Peter Stolt	0	0	1	1	0	2	1	0	0	X	5
(Minnesota) Todd Birr 🔨	4	1	0	0	2	0	0	1	1	X	9

Team	1	2	3	4	5	6	7	8	9	10	Final
(Minnesota) Mike Farbelow	3	0	0	3	1	0	X	X	X	X	7
(North Dakota) Owen Sampson 🔨	0	1	0	0	0	1	X	X	X	X	2

Team	1	2	3	4	5	6	7	8	9	10	Final
(Minnesota) Kent Beadle	0	0	3	0	2	0	0	3	0	X	8
(Minnesota) Lionel Locke 🔨	2	1	0	1	0	0	1	0	1	X	6

Team	1	2	3	4	5	6	7	8	9	10	Final
(North Dakota) Ryan Berg 🔨	0	2	0	1	0	2	3	0	3	X	11
(Minnesota) John Lilla	1	0	1	0	1	0	0	3	0	X	5

Team	1	2	3	4	5	6	7	8	9	10	Final
(Minnesota) Mark Willmert	0	0	2	0	0	2	0	0	1	X	5
(Minnesota) Eric Fenson 🔨	1	1	0	3	1	0	1	1	0	X	8

==== Draw 5 ====
Saturday, January 11, 9:00 am

Team	1	2	3	4	5	6	7	8	9	10	Final
(Minnesota) Tyler George	1	0	0	1	2	0	0	1	0	X	5
(Minnesota) Joseph Bonfoey 🔨	0	1	1	0	0	5	1	0	1	X	9

Team	1	2	3	4	5	6	7	8	9	10	Final
(Wisconsin) Craig Brown	0	2	1	2	1	X	X	X	X	X	6
(Minnesota) Todd Birr	0	0	0	0	0	X	X	X	X	X	0

Team	1	2	3	4	5	6	7	8	9	10	Final
(Wisconsin) Dale Gibbs 🔨	4	0	0	0	2	0	1	0	0	1	8
(Minnesota) Lionel Locke	0	1	1	1	0	3	0	0	0	0	6

Team	1	2	3	4	5	6	7	8	9	10	Final
(Washington (state)) Sam Galey 🔨	0	0	2	0	0	1	0	1	X	X	4
(North Dakota) Owen Sampson	2	1	0	2	2	0	2	0	X	X	9

Team	1	2	3	4	5	6	7	8	9	10	Final
(Washington (state)) Chris Bond	0	2	0	0	2	3	0	0	1	X	8
(Minnesota) Mark Willmert 🔨	2	0	2	1	0	0	1	0	0	X	6

Team	1	2	3	4	5	6	7	8	9	10	Final
(North Dakota) Kevin Kakela 🔨	0	1	0	0	0	2	0	X	X	X	3
(Minnesota) John Lilla	3	0	0	1	3	0	2	X	X	X	9

==== Draw 6 ====
Saturday, January 11, 2:00 pm

Team	1	2	3	4	5	6	7	8	9	10	11	Final
(Minnesota) Stephen Dropkin	1	0	0	0	0	1	0	2	0	1	1	6
(Minnesota) Mike Farbelow 🔨	0	1	1	1	0	0	1	0	1	0	0	5

Team	1	2	3	4	5	6	7	8	9	10	Final
(Minnesota) Peter Stolt 🔨	0	3	0	0	0	0	3	0	2	X	8
(Minnesota) Kent Beadle	0	0	2	0	0	1	0	1	0	X	4

Team	1	2	3	4	5	6	7	8	9	10	Final
(Wisconsin) Ryan Lemke 🔨	2	1	0	0	0	0	0	1	1	2	7
(North Dakota) Ryan Berg	0	0	0	1	1	2	0	0	0	0	4

Team	1	2	3	4	5	6	7	8	9	10	11	Final
(New York (state)) Alex Leichter 🔨	1	1	1	2	0	0	0	1	0	0	1	7
(Minnesota) Eric Fenson	0	0	0	0	0	2	2	0	1	1	0	6

==== Draw 7 ====
Saturday, January 11, 7:00 pm

Team	1	2	3	4	5	6	7	8	9	10	11	Final
(Minnesota) Stephen Dropkin 🔨	1	2	0	0	0	2	1	0	1	0	0	7
(Minnesota) Peter Stolt	0	0	1	1	2	0	0	1	0	2	1	8

Team	1	2	3	4	5	6	7	8	9	10	Final
(Wisconsin) Ryan Lemke 🔨	1	0	1	0	1	1	0	0	2	0	6
(New York (state)) Alex Leichter	0	1	0	3	0	0	2	1	0	1	8

Team	1	2	3	4	5	6	7	8	9	10	Final
(Minnesota) Eric Fenson	0	3	0	3	0	3	0	2	X	X	11
(Wisconsin) Dale Gibbs 🔨	1	0	2	0	1	0	1	0	X	X	5

Team	1	2	3	4	5	6	7	8	9	10	Final
(North Dakota) Ryan Berg	0	0	0	1	0	0	2	0	0	0	3
(North Dakota) Owen Sampson 🔨	0	0	0	0	1	1	0	1	1	2	6

Team	1	2	3	4	5	6	7	8	9	10	11	Final
(Minnesota) Kent Beadle	0	2	1	0	0	0	4	0	2	0	2	11
(Washington (state)) Chris Bond 🔨	2	0	0	1	1	1	0	2	0	2	0	9

Team	1	2	3	4	5	6	7	8	9	10	11	Final
(Minnesota) Mike Farbelow	0	0	2	0	0	1	0	2	1	0	1	7
(Minnesota) John Lilla	1	2	0	1	1	0	0	0	0	1	0	6

==== Draw 8 ====
Sunday, January 12, 9:00 am

Team	1	2	3	4	5	6	7	8	9	10	Final
(Minnesota) Peter Stolt	0	0	0	2	0	1	1	0	0	X	4
(Minnesota) Tyler George 🔨	0	2	1	0	2	0	0	2	1	X	8

Team	1	2	3	4	5	6	7	8	9	10	Final
(New York (state)) Alex Leichter 🔨	2	1	0	1	0	2	0	0	2	X	8
(Minnesota) Todd Birr	0	0	2	0	2	0	1	1	0	X	6

Team	1	2	3	4	5	6	7	8	9	10	Final
(Minnesota) Eric Fenson 🔨	0	0	3	0	2	0	1	1	0	1	8
(North Dakota) Owen Sampson	1	1	0	1	0	1	0	0	2	0	6

Team	1	2	3	4	5	6	7	8	9	10	Final
(Minnesota) Kent Beadle	0	1	0	1	0	2	0	0	1	X	5
(Minnesota) Mike Farbelow 🔨	2	0	2	0	2	0	0	2	0	X	8

==== Draw 9 ====
Sunday, January 12, 2:00 pm

Team	1	2	3	4	5	6	7	8	9	10	Final
(Minnesota) Eric Fenson	0	0	0	3	0	1	1	0	0	1	6
(Minnesota) Stephen Dropkin 🔨	1	1	1	0	0	0	0	2	0	0	5

Team	1	2	3	4	5	6	7	8	9	10	Final
(Minnesota) Mike Farbelow 🔨	0	1	0	0	2	0	1	1	1	1	7
(Wisconsin) Ryan Lemke	1	0	1	1	0	2	0	0	0	0	5

==== Draw 10 ====
Sunday, January 12, 7:00 pm

Team	1	2	3	4	5	6	7	8	9	10	Final
(Minnesota) Eric Fenson 🔨	2	0	1	1	1	0	0	3	0	2	10
(Minnesota) Todd Birr	0	3	0	0	0	2	1	0	3	0	9

Team	1	2	3	4	5	6	7	8	9	10	Final
(Minnesota) Mike Farbelow 🔨	2	0	1	0	2	0	1	0	0	X	6
(Minnesota) Peter Stolt	0	3	0	4	0	1	0	1	3	X	12
