= Blake Morton =

American curler (born 1991)

- Curler
- Born: March 17, 1991 (age 35)

Team
- Curling club: Bemidji CC, Bemidji
- Skip: Eric Fenson
- Third: Trevor Andrews
- Second: Blake Morton
- Lead: Calvin Weber

Curling career
- Other appearances: Winter Universiade: 1 (2011)

Blake Morton (born March 17, 1991) is an American curler from McFarland, Wisconsin.

== Career ==
Morton has played in two United States Men's Junior Curling Championships, finishing third in 2009 and 7th in 2010. Also in 2010, he played in his first national men's championship, finishing with a 3–6 record, in 9th place.

Morton skipped for the U.S. team at the 2011 Winter Universiade, where the U.S. finished with a 4–5 record in 7th place.

Morton returned to the United States Junior Curling Championships the next year, and lost in the final to Stephen Dropkin. He then participated in the 2012 United States Men's Curling Championship after qualifying for the nationals through the Green Bay qualifier, and finished in last place with a 1–9 record.

Morton joined Eric Fenson with teammate Calvin Weber in the 2012–13 curling season.

== Personal life ==
Morton is currently studying management, human resources, and marketing at the University of Wisconsin–Madison.

== Teams ==
Season	Skip	Third	Second	Lead	Events
2009–10	Blake Morton	Marcus Fonger	Tommy Juszczyk	Calvin Weber	2010 USJCC, USNCC
2010–11	Blake Morton	Marcus Fonger	Tommy Juszczyk	Calvin Weber	2011 Univ.
2011–12	Blake Morton	Marcus Fonger	Tommy Juszczyk	Calvin Weber	2012 USJCC, USNCC
2012–13	Eric Fenson	Trevor Andrews	Blake Morton	Calvin Weber	
