= Eric Fenson =

American curler

- Curler
- Born: May 6, 1971 (age 55); Bemidji, Minnesota, U.S.

Team
- Curling club: Bemidji CC, Bemidji, Minnesota
- Skip: Eric Fenson
- Third: Josh Bahr
- Second: Jon Chandler
- Lead: Mark Haluptzok

Curling career
- World Championship: 1 (2003)

Eric Fenson (born May 6, 1971, in Bemidji, Minnesota) is an American curler. He lives in Bemidji and curls out of the Bemidji Curling Club. He is a former national champion, and skips his own team.

== Career ==
Fenson began curling at the age of ten. He was a state junior champion and state champion, and competed in the United States Men's Junior Curling Championship, finishing third in 1990 and winning the championship in 1991 and 1992. He won a bronze medal at the 1991 World Junior Curling Championships, which he was named 1991 USCA Male Athlete of the Year for, and finished fifth in 1992. He appeared at his first national men's championship in 1996, and participated in the 1998, 1999 and 2001 national championships, with his best finish as a semifinalist in 1999. In 2003, with his brother Pete skipping, Fenson won the national championship and participated in the 2003 Ford World Men's Curling Championship, finishing eighth. The next year, his team finished as runners-up in the nationals to Jason Larway.

Fenson then left his brother's team and joined Scott Baird. With his new team, he participated in the 2005 United States Olympic Curling Trials, finishing fifth. In 2010, he joined Mike Farbelow to participate in the nationals, and finished as a runner-up. Fenson, under Farbelow, then attempted to qualify for the nationals in 2011, but did not advance past the Challenge Round. Fenson then formed his own team, and made it through the qualifying rounds of the 2012 National Championships, qualifying for the nationals via the Challenge Round.

== Personal life ==
Fenson graduated from Bemidji State University with a bachelor's degree in business administration. Fenson owns a carpet and upholstery cleaning company.

Fenson is married and has two children, Riley and Kylen. He enjoys golf, fishing, travelling, and spending time with his family. His brother, Pete Fenson, is a curler known for winning the bronze medal at the 2006 Winter Olympics.

== Teams ==
Season	Skip	Third	Second	Lead	Events
1990–91	Eric Fenson	Shawn Rojeski	Kevin Bergstrom	Ted McCann	1991 WJCC
1991–92	Eric Fenson	Shawn Rojeski	Kevin Bergstrom	Ted McCann	1992 WJCC
1996–97	Pete Fenson	Jason Larway	Joel Larway	Eric Fenson	
1998–99	Pete Fenson	Eric Fenson	Shawn Rojeski	Mark Haluptzok	
1999–00	Pete Fenson	Jason Larway	Shawn Rojeski	Eric Fenson	
2003–04	Pete Fenson	Eric Fenson	Shawn Rojeski	John Shuster	2003 Cont., USNCC, WCC
2005–06	Scott Baird	Eric Fenson	Tim Johnson	Mark Haluptzok	2005 USOCT/USNCC
2009–10	Mike Farbelow	Eric Fenson	Nick Myers	Aaron Nunberg	2010 USNCC
2011–12	Eric Fenson	Trevor Andrews	Quentin Way	Mark Lazar	2012 USNCC
2012–13	Eric Fenson	Trevor Andrews	Blake Morton	Calvin Weber	
2013–14	Eric Fenson	Josh Bahr	Jon Chandler	Mark Haluptzok alt.: Riley Fenson	2014 USNCC (10th)
