= Bill Morehouse =

American curler

William C. Morehouse (November 7, 1960 in Utica, New York) is an American curler and curling broadcaster.

== Curling ==
Morehouse started curling for the Utica Curling Club in 1972. He finished seventh in the 2005 U.S. National Championships and 2005 U.S. Olympic Trials. He was a semifinalist in the 1995 and 2000 Mixed National Championships.

== Broadcasting ==
Morehouse called the first USA Curling match broadcast live on the Internet during the 2000 Mixed National Championship final. He also provided color commentary for the TV broadcast of the 2001 Women's Olympic Trials final. He also broadcast several games at the 2003 Worlds in Winnipeg and for the men's and women's finals of the 2003 USA Curling National Championships in Utica on the Internet. Bill continued his audiocast at the 2006 U.S. Olympic Team Trials in Madison, Wisconsin, and provided the voice for CSTV's coverage of the 2006 U.S. Olympic Trials and National College Tournament. He also worked with ESPN2 to provide color commentary for the 2006 World Championships programs. In 2008, he was the color commentator for CBS College Sports Network's coverage of the 2008 Ford World Men's Curling Championship, calling the games alongside play by play announcer Andrew Catalon.

== Personal ==
Morehouse is a graduate of the University of Nebraska–Lincoln of and works as an independent insurance agent with Morcy-Morehouse Inc. He and his wife Deb have two children, Margaret and Billy. His son Billy is an executive at Forum Communications Company. Morehouse was elected as an Oneida County legislator in 2003. He is currently president of the Utica Common Council.
