= 2012 USA-Brazil Challenge =

2012 curling challenge

- Host city: Bemidji, Minnesota
- Arena: Bemidji Curling Club
- Dates: January 27–29

The 2012 USA-Brazil Challenge was to be a curling challenge taking place from January 27 to 29 at the Bemidji Curling Club in Bemidji, Minnesota. The challenge round would have determined which nation would qualify to the last Americas Zone spot at the 2012 Capital One World Men's Curling Championship in Basel, Switzerland.

On January 10, the Brazilian team announced that they had withdrawn their challenge to the USA. The Brazilian Ice Sports Federation said in a statement, "It is with great regret that we have to withdraw from the America's Challenge. As a result of recently losing our team coach, the team feels they are not playing well enough to constitute a proper and fit challenge to Team USA for the last remaining place at the 2012 World Men's Championship."

== Background ==
The World Curling Federation allots two spots at the World Men's Curling Championship to the Americas Zone, which are normally taken by Canada and the United States. However, the World Curling Federation allows for other member nations in the Americas Zone (i.e. Brazil) to challenge Canada and/or the United States for berths to the World Championships. As Canada is the defending champion at the World Championships, Canada receive an automatic berth to the 2012 World Championships. Thus, Brazil is allowed to challenge the United States for a berth to the 2012 World Championships. This is Brazil's third challenge of the United States, after challenges in 2009 and 2010 proved to be unsuccessful.

The Brazilian team was training at the Lennoxville Curling Club in Quebec in preparation for the challenge.

== Teams ==
The teams that were scheduled to compete are listed as follows:

Nation	Skip	Third	Second	Lead	Alternate	Locale
United States	Pete Fenson	Shawn Rojeski	Joe Polo	Ryan Brunt		Bemidji Curling Club, Bemidji
Brazil	Luis Silva, Celso Kossaka, Marcelo Mello, Cesar Santos, Filipe Nunes					Lennoxville Curling Club, Sherbrooke

*The positions for the Brazilian team were to be announced.
