= Trevor Andrews =

American curler

- Curler
- Born: May 21, 1990 (age 36); Bemidji, Minnesota, U.S.

Curling career
- Member Association: Minnesota

Trevor Andrews (born May 21, 1990, in Bemidji, Minnesota) is an American curler. He lives in Bemidji and curls out of the Bemidji Curling Club.

== Career ==
Andrews began curling in 2003. He is a former Minnesota junior champion and bronze medal winner at the 2010 United States Men's Junior Curling Championship. He joined Eric Fenson's team as third for the 2011–12 curling season. They won the 2012 Men's Challenge Round, earning them a spot at the 2012 United States Men's Curling Championship where they finished in ninth place. Fenson and Andrews attempted to repeat their success at the 2013 Men's Challenge Round but failed to qualify for that year's national championship, finishing the challenge round with a 4–3 record.

== Personal life ==
As of 2016, Andrews was a student at Bemidji State University studying in pre-dentistry.
