= Mark Haluptzok =

American curler

- Curler ♂
- Born: December 19, 1951 (age 74); Bemidji, Minnesota, U.S.

Team
- Curling club: Bemidji CC, Bemidji, MN

Curling career
- Member Association: United States
- World Championship: 5 (1979, 1993, 1994, 1999, 2010)
- Other appearances: World Senior Championships: 1 (2003)
Medal record
Curling
World Championships
Bronze medal – third place	1993 Geneva
United States Men's Championship
Gold medal – first place	1979 Superior
Gold medal – first place	1993 St. Paul
Gold medal – first place	1994 Duluth
Silver medal – second place	1996 Bemidji
Bronze medal – third place	1981 Fairbanks
Bronze medal – third place	1986 Seattle
Bronze medal – third place	1988 St. Paul
World Senior Championships
Silver medal – second place	2003 Winnipeg

Mark Haluptzok (born December 19, 1951, in Bemidji, Minnesota, United States) is an American curler.

He is a 1993 World Men's bronze medallist.

He inducted into the United States Curling Association Hall of Fame in 2007.

== Teams ==
=== Men's ===
Season	Skip	Third	Second	Lead	Alternate	Coach	Events
1978–79	Scott Baird	Dan Haluptzok	Mark Haluptzok	Bob Fenson			USMCC 1979 (gold); WCC 1979 (5th)
1980–81	Mark Haluptzok	Dan Haluptzok	Bob Fenson	John Iserealson			USMCC 1981 (bronze)
1982–83	Scott Baird	Bruce Roberts	Gary Kleffman	Mark Haluptzok	Craig Polski		USMCC 1983 (5th)
1985–86	Scott Baird	Dan Haluptzok	Mark Haluptzok	Bob Fenson			USMCC 1986 (bronze)
1987–88	Scott Baird	Dan Haluptzok	Mark Haluptzok	Bob Fenson			USMCC 1988 (bronze)
1992–93	Scott Baird	Pete Fenson	Mark Haluptzok	Tim Johnson	Dan Haluptzok		USMCC 1993 (gold); WCC 1993 (bronze)
1993–94	Scott Baird	Pete Fenson	Mark Haluptzok	Tim Johnson	Dan Haluptzok		USMCC 1994 (gold); WCC 1994 (5th)
1994–95	Mark Haluptzok	?	?	?			USMCC 1995 (5th)
1995–96	Mark Haluptzok	?	?	?			USMCC 1996 (silver)
1996–97	Don Barcome Jr.	Mark Haluptzok	Tim Johnson	Earl Barcome			
1998–99	Pete Fenson	Eric Fenson	Shawn Rojeski	Mark Haluptzok			
1998–99	Tim Somerville	Don Barcome Jr.	Myles Brundidge	John Gordon	Mark Haluptzok	Bud Somerville	WCC 1999 (4th)
1999–00	Andy Borland	Mark Haluptzok	Joel Koski	Kevin Stevens			
1999–00	Don Barcome Jr.	Mark Haluptzok	Tim Kreklau	Tim Johnson	Randy Darling		USMCC 2000 (SF)
2000–01	Don Barcome Jr.	Mark Haluptzok	Tim Kreklau	Randy Darling	Tim Johnson		USMCC 2001 (8th)
2001–02	Don Barcome Jr.	Mark Haluptzok	Tim Kreklau	Kelby Smith	Randy Darling		USMCC 2002 (SF)
2002–03	Scott Baird	Mark Haluptzok	Bob Fenson	Bob Naylor	Richard Reierson		WSCC 2003 (silver)
2003–04	Matt Stevens (fourth)	Don Barcome Jr. (skip)	Cody Stevens	Mark Haluptzok			
2004–05	Scott Baird	Eric Fenson	Tim Johnson	Mark Haluptzok			USMCC 2005 (SF)
2005–06	Don Barcome Jr.	Mark Haluptzok	Quentin Way	Mark Lazar			USMCC 2006 (9th)
2008–09	Tyler George	Kris Perkovich	Mark Haluptzok	Kevin Johnson			
2009–10	Pete Fenson	Shawn Rojeski	Joe Polo	Tyler George	Mark Haluptzok	Ed Lukowich	WCC 2010 (4th)
2011–12	Mark Haluptzok	John Israelson	Randy Hovet	Matt Gamboa			
2012–13	Mark Haluptzok	Jerod Roland	Nic Wagner	Jon Chandler			
2013–14	Eric Fenson	Josh Bahr	Jon Chandler	Mark Haluptzok	Riley Fenson		USMCC 2014 (10th)
2014–15	Mark Haluptzok	Josh Bahr	Aaron Wald	Jon Chandler			USMCC 2015 (9th)
2015–16	Josh Bahr	Aaron Wald	Jon Chandler	Mark Haluptzok			
2016–17	Josh Bahr	Aaron Wald	Jon Chandler	Mark Haluptzok			
2017–18	Josh Bahr	Aaron Wald	Jon Chandler	Mark Haluptzok			

=== Mixed ===
Season	Skip	Third	Second	Lead	Events
1980	Mark Haluptzok	Liz Johnson	Tim Johnson	Mary Jo Roufs	USMxCC 1980 (gold)
1982	Mark Haluptzok	Liz Johnson	Tim Johnson	Mary Jo Roufs	USMxCC 1982 (gold)

== Private life ==
Mark Haluptzok works as commercial flooring contractor; he is owner of Haluptzok Flooring and T. Juan's Restaurant.

He started curling in 1963 when he was 12 years old. His father, mother and older brother Dan are curlers too, Dan played together with Mark on three Worlds (1979, 1993, 1994).
