= Bemidji Curling Club =

Curling club in USA

- Location: 1230 23rd Street NW; Bemidji, Minnesota 56619-0101

Information
- Established: 1935
- Club type: Dedicated ice
- USCA region: Minnesota
- Sheets of ice: Six
- Website: https://www.bemidjicurling.org/

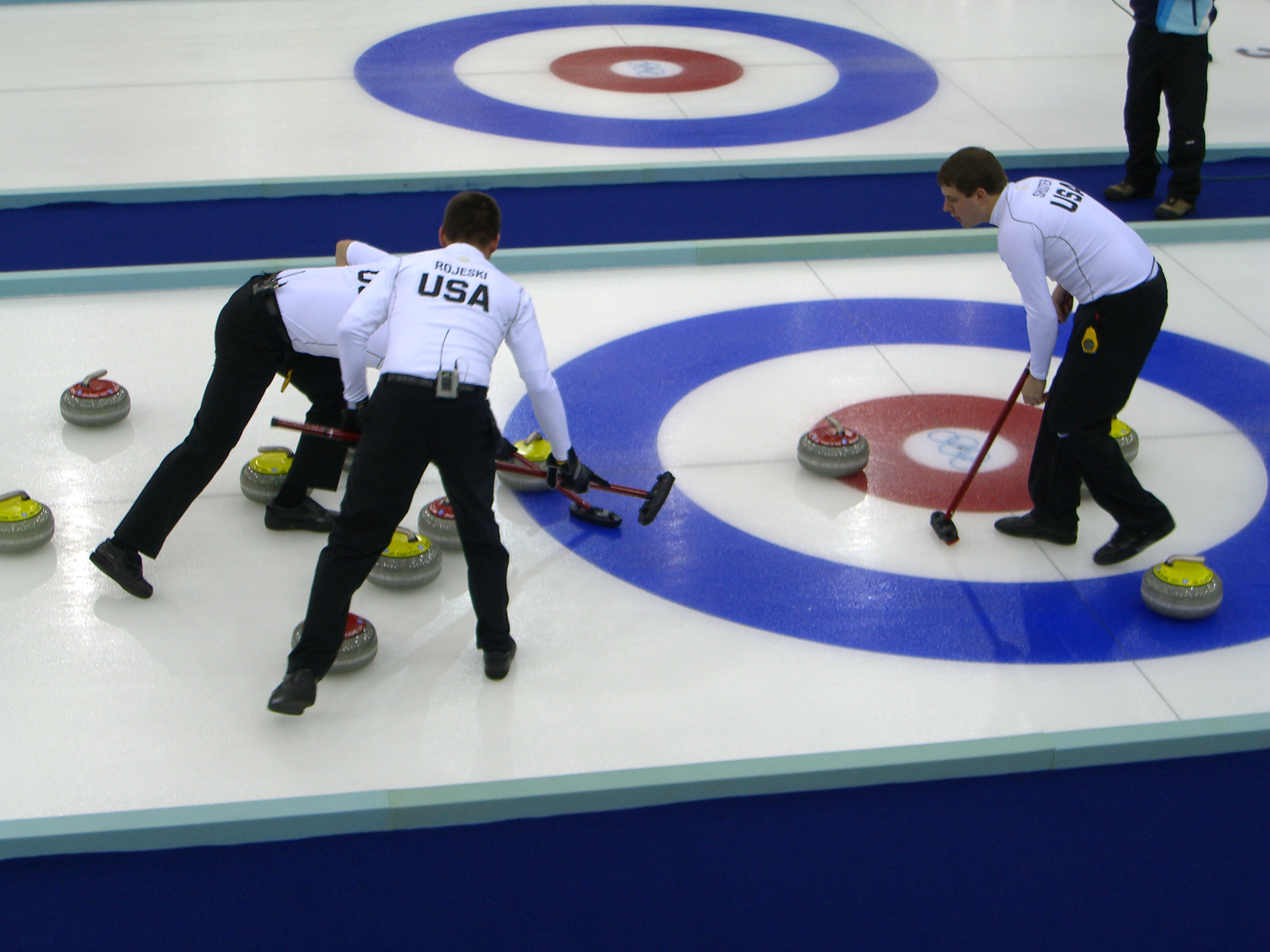
Curling at the 2006 Olympics

The Bemidji Curling Club is a curling club located in the city of Bemidji, Minnesota. It is notable for its long line of champions in many competitions, including men's and women's rinks which represented the United States in the 2005 World Curling Championship and the 2006 Winter Olympics in Turin, Italy.

Pete Fenson skipped the men's rink, which won the Olympic bronze medal, the first-ever medal in curling for the U.S. Cassandra Johnson skipped the women's rink, which lost to Sweden in the final match of the 2005 World Women's Curling Championship. Another of the club's members, Scott Baird, played as an alternate on the Olympic men's rink. In the 2006 Winter Olympics, six athletes from Bemidji Curling Club competed in the games.

The club was founded in 1935 but not open to women curlers until 1951.

In 2022, the club made a request to the city council for funding to assist with repairs.
