= Mike Farbelow =

American curler (born 1963)

- Curler
- Born: March 30, 1963 (age 63); St. Paul, Minnesota, U.S.

Team
- Skip: Mike Farbelow
- Third: Rich Ruohonen
- Second: Bill Stopera
- Lead: Darren Lehto

Curling career
- Other appearances: World Senior Curling Championships: 3 (2024, 2025, 2026)
Medal record
Curling
Representing United States
World Senior Curling Championships
| Gold medal – first place | 2026 Geneva |
| Silver medal – second place | 2024 Östersund |
| Bronze medal – third place | 2025 Fredericton |

Mike Farbelow (born March 30, 1963, in Saint Paul, Minnesota) is an American curler. He lives in Minneapolis.

== Career ==
Farbelow began curling in 1977. Farbelow made appearances at the United States Men's Curling Championship in 1985, 1998, 2009, 2010, 2011, 2012, and 2013. He served as alternate on Team Jacobson at the 2011 national championships. Farbelow is also the 2007 National club champion, 1985 Minnesota state champion, and the 1981 and 1983 Minnesota junior champion.

Farbelow led his rink to a fifth-place finish in 2009, when he was the winner of the Ann Brown Sportsmanship Award; he won the award again in 2013. He then skipped his team to a silver medal at the 2010 U.S. Men's Championships, where they lost the gold medal match to Pete Fenson's rink. It was Farbelow's fourth trip to the U.S. championships and his first medal finish. Farbelow played in the 2009 United States Olympic Curling Trials.

Farbelow led his senior curling team to US titles in 2017, 2024, and 2025. In 2024 his team placed 2nd in the World Championships held in Ostersund, Sweden.

Farbelow was the former President of Medistim USA Inc.

== Personal life ==
Farbelow is a graduate of the University of Minnesota, and was formerly employed with Medistim where he served as President of the US team.

Farbelow's father Bill served as national technical director of the U.S. Curling Association in the 1990s.
