= 2012 Iron Trail Motors Shoot-Out =

World Curling Tour event

- Host city: Eveleth, Minnesota
- Arena: Range Recreation and Civic Center
- Dates: December 13–16
- Men's winner: (Minnesota) Tyler George
- Skip: Tyler George
- Fourth: Christopher Plys
- Second: Rich Ruohonen
- Lead: Colin Hufman
- Finalist: (Minnesota) Todd Birr
- Women's winner: (Alberta) Jessie Kaufman
- Skip: Jessie Kaufman
- Third: Nicky Kaufman
- Second: Kelly Erickson
- Lead: Stephanie Enright
- Finalist: (Minnesota) Allison Pottinger

The 2012 Iron Trail Motors Shoot-Out was held from December 13 to 16 at the Range Recreation and Civic Center in Eveleth, Minnesota as part of the 2012–13 World Curling Tour. Both the men's and women's events were being held in a round robin format. The purse for the men's event was USD21,500, and the purse for the women's event was USD12,500. In the men's final, Tyler George won his second title at Curl Mesabi with a win over last year's runner-up Todd Birr, wrapping up the game with a score of 5–1 in five ends. In the women's final, Jessie Kaufman of Alberta won her first title by defeating last year's runner-up Allison Pottinger with a score of 5–2.

The Iron Trail Motors Shoot-Out was the final event in the season in which teams were able to earn qualifying points for the 2013 United States National Curling Championships on the United States' Order of Merit system, which awards spots to the top two finishers on the Order of Merit.

== Men ==
=== Teams ===
The teams are listed as follows:

Skip	Third	Second	Lead	Locale
Randy Baird	Phill Drobnick	Chase Schmidt	Josh Bahr	Bemidji, Minnesota
Ryan Berg	Al Gulseth	Mark Gulseth	Jordan Brown	West Fargo, North Dakota
Todd Birr	Doug Pottinger	Tom O'Connor	Kevin Birr	Mankato, Minnesota
Joseph Bonfoey				Madison, Wisconsin
Trevor Bonot	Allen Macsemchuk	Chris Briand	Tim Jewett	Thunder Bay, Ontario
Craig Brown	Kroy Nernberger	Matt Hamilton	Jon Brunt	Madison, Wisconsin
Bryan Burgess	Mike Pozihun	Dale Weirsema	Pat Berezoski	Thunder Bay, Ontario
Jeff Currie	Mike McCarville	Colin Koivula	Jamie Childs	Thunder Bay, Ontario
Philip DeVore	Seppo Sormunen	Doug Cameron	Roger Hendrickson	Duluth, Minnesota
Chris Dolan	Cam McLelland	Tim Jeanetta	Brian Sparstad	St. Paul, Minnesota
Tim Drobnick	Dennis Jorgenson	Craig Wainio	Erik Briski	Eveleth, Minnesota
Korey Dropkin	Thomas Howell	Connor Hoge	Alex Fenson	Wayland, Massachusetts
Eric Fenson	Trevor Andrews	Blake Morton	Calvin Weber	Bemidji, Minnesota
Pete Fenson	Shawn Rojeski	Joe Polo	Ryan Brunt	Bemidji, Minnesota
Christopher Plys (fourth)	Tyler George (skip)	Rich Ruohonen	Colin Hufman	Duluth, Minnesota
Dale Gibbs	William Raymond	Eric Schultz	Perry Tholl	St. Paul, Minnesota
Geoff Goodland	Tim Solin	Pete Westberg	Ken Olson	St. Paul, Minnesota
Al Hackner	Kory Carr	Kristofer Leupen	Gary Champagne	Thunder Bay, Ontario
Mark Haluptzok		Rob Corn	Jon Chandler	Bemidji, Minnesota
Dave Jensen	Kent Beadle	Roger Smith		St. Paul, Minnesota
Evan Jensen	Daniel Metcalf	Dan Ruehl	Steve Gebauer	St. Paul, Minnesota
Andy Jukich			Duane Rutan	Duluth, Minnesota
Kevin Kakela	Adam Kitchens	Kyle Kakela	Travis Kitchens	Rolla, North Dakota
Ryan Lemke	Nathan Gebert	John Lilla	Casey Konopacky	Medford, Wisconsin
Kris Perkovich	Aaron Wald	Kevin Johnson	Taylor Skalsky	Chisholm, Minnesota
Jeff Puleo	Derek Surka	Joel Cooper (Note: Cooper is now known as JayCee due to gender transition.)	Cooper Smith	Forest Lake, Minnesota
Jeremy Roe	Steve Day	Richard Maskel	Mark Hartman	Madison, Wisconsin
Tom Scott	Benjamin Wilson	Tony Wilson	John Scott	Hibbing, Minnesota
John Shuster	Jeff Isaacson	Jared Zezel	John Landsteiner	Duluth, Minnesota
Matt Stevens	Cody Stevens	Robert Liapis	Jeff Breyen	Bemidji, Minnesota

=== Round-robin standings ===
Final round-robin standings

Key
Teams to Playoffs

Pool A	W	L
(Minnesota) Pete Fenson	3	1
(Minnesota) Tim Drobnick	3	1
(Minnesota) Randy Baird	2	2
(Minnesota) Chris Dolan	2	2
(Minnesota) Geoff Goodland	0	4

Pool D	W	L
(Wisconsin) Craig Brown	4	0
(Ontario) Jeff Currie	2	2
(Minnesota) Andy Jukich	2	2
(Minnesota) Mark Haluptzok	1	3
(Minnesota) Tom Scott	1	3

Pool B	W	L
(Minnesota) Tyler George	4	0
(Massachusetts) Korey Dropkin	2	2
(North Dakota) Dave Jensen	1	2
(Minnesota) Jeff Puleo	1	2
(Minnesota) Matt Stevens	1	3

Pool E	W	L
(Ontario) Bryan Burgess	4	0
(Minnesota) Todd Birr	3	1
(Wisconsin) Joseph Bonfoey	2	2
(North Dakota) Kevin Kakela	1	3
(Wisconsin) Ryan Lemke	0	4

Pool C	W	L
(Ontario) Trevor Bonot	4	0
(Minnesota) Kris Perkovich	3	1
(Minnesota) John Shutser	2	2
(Minnesota) Evan Jensen	1	3
(Minnesota) Philip DeVore	0	4

Pool F	W	L
(Ontario) Al Hackner	4	0
(North Dakota) Ryan Berg	2	2
(Minnesota) Eric Fenson	2	2
(Minnesota) Dale Gibbs	1	3
(Wisconsin) Jeremy Roe	1	3

=== Playoffs ===
The playoffs draw is listed as follows:

Quarterfinals
(Minnesota) Tyler George	8
(Minnesota) Pete Fenson	1
(Ontario) Al Hackner	6
(Ontario) Bryan Burgess	2
(Minnesota) Todd Birr	5
(Wisconsin) Craig Brown	4
(Minnesota) Tim Drobnick	6
(Ontario) Trevor Bonot	3

Semifinals
(Minnesota) Tyler George	6
(Ontario) Al Hackner	5
(Minnesota) Todd Birr	6
(Minnesota) Tim Drobnick	0

Final
(Minnesota) Tyler George	5
(Minnesota) Todd Birr	1

== Women ==
=== Teams ===
The teams are listed as follows:

Skip	Third	Second	Lead	Locale
Sarah Anderson	Kathleen Dubberstein	Taylor Anderson	Leilani Dubberstein	Philadelphia, Pennsylvania
Brett Barber	Robyn Silvernagle	Kailena Bay	Dayna Demmans	Regina, Saskatchewan
Alexandra Carlson	Monica Walker	Kendall Moulton	Jordan Moulton	Minneapolis, Minnesota
Tanilla Doyle	Joelle Horn	Lindsay Amundsen-Meyer	Christina Faulkner	Edmonton, Alberta
Becca Hamilton	Molly Bonner	Tara Peterson	Sophie Brorson	Madison, Wisconsin
Jessie Kaufman	Nicky Kaufman	Kelly Erickson	Stephanie Enright	Edmonton, Alberta
Shelly Kinney	Amy Lou Anderson	Theresa Hoffoss	Julie Smith	Minnesota
Patti Lank	Mackenzie Lank	Nina Spatola	Caitlin Maroldo	(New York (state)) Lewiston, New York
Charrissa Lin	Sherri Schummer	Emilia Juocys	Senja Lopac	New Haven, Connecticut
Mari Motohashi	Yurika Yoshida	Megumi Mabuchi	Yumi Suzuki	Kitami, Japan
Cassie Potter	Jamie Haskell	Jackie Lemke	Steph Sambor	St. Paul, Minnesota
Allison Pottinger	Nicole Joraanstad	Natalie Nicholson	Tabitha Peterson	St. Paul, Minnesota
Margie Smith	Norma O'Leary	Debbie Dexter	Shelly Kosal	St. Paul, Minnesota
Kimberly Wapola	Cynthia Eng-Dinsel	Carol Strojny	Ann Flis	St. Paul, Minnesota
Amy Wright	Courtney George	Aileen Sormunen	Amanda McLean	Duluth, Minnesota

=== Round-robin standings ===
Final round-robin standings

Key
Teams to Playoffs

Pool A	W	L
(Minnesota) Alexandra Carlson	3	1
(Alberta) Jessie Kaufman	3	1
(Pennsylvania) Sarah Anderson	2	2
(Minnesota) Amy Wright	2	2
(Minnesota) Margie Smith	0	4

Pool B	W	L
(Minnesota) Allison Pottinger	3	1
(Alberta) Tanilla Doyle	2	2
(Minnesota) Shelly Kinney	2	2
(Minnesota) Cassie Potter	2	2
(New York (state)) Joyance Meechai	1	3

Pool C	W	L
(New York (state)) Patti Lank	3	1
(Japan) Mari Motohashi	3	1
(Saskatchewan) Brett Barber	2	2
(Connecticut) Charrissa Lin	2	2
(Minnesota) Kimberly Wapola	0	4

=== Playoffs ===
The playoffs draw is listed as follows:

Quarterfinals
(New York (state)) Patti Lank	3
(Alberta) Jessie Kaufman	8
(Minnesota) Allison Pottinger	4
(Saskatchewan) Brett Barber	2

Semifinals
(Japan) Mari Motohashi	1
(Alberta) Jessie Kaufman	9
(Minnesota) Alexandra Carlson	3
(Minnesota) Allison Pottinger	6

Final
(Alberta) Jessie Kaufman	5
(Minnesota) Allison Pottinger	2
