= 2012 Madison Cash Spiel =

World Curling Tour

- Host city: Madison, Wisconsin
- Arena: Madison Curling Club
- Dates: November 30 – December 2
- Men's winner: (Minnesota) Pete Fenson
- Curling club: Bemidji CC, Bemidji
- Skip: Pete Fenson
- Third: Shawn Rojeski
- Second: Joe Polo
- Lead: Ryan Brunt
- Finalist: (Minnesota) John Shuster
- Women's winner: (Wisconsin) Erika Brown
- Curling club: Madison CC, Madison
- Skip: Erika Brown
- Third: Debbie McCormick
- Second: Jessica Schultz
- Lead: Ann Swisshelm
- Finalist: (Ontario) Jill Mouzar

The 2012 Madison Cash Spiel was held from November 30 to December 2 at the Madison Curling Club in Madison, Wisconsin as part of the 2012–13 World Curling Tour. The event was held in a round robin format. In the men's final, Pete Fenson won his second consecutive title and fourth title overall with a win over former teammate John Shuster. Fenson defeated Shuster in an extra end with a score of 6–5. In the women's final, Erika Brown defeated Jill Mouzar with a score of 8–7 to win her second consecutive and overall title.

== Men ==
=== Teams ===
The teams are listed as follows:

Skip	Third	Second	Lead	Locale
Alexander Attinger	Felix Attinger	Daniel Schifferli	Simon Attinger	Switzerland
Todd Birr	Doug Pottinger	Tom O'Connor	Kevin Birr	Mankato, Minnesota
Craig Brown	Kroy Nernberger	Matt Hamilton	Jon Brunt	Madison, Wisconsin
Chris Dolan	Cam McLelland	Tim Jeanetta	Brian Sparstad	St. Paul, Minnesota
Korey Dropkin	Mark Fenner	Connor Hoge	Alex Fenson	Wayland, Massachusetts
Mike Farbelow	Kevin Deeren	Kraig Deeren	Mark Lazar	St. Paul, Minnesota
Eric Fenson	Trevor Andrews	Blake Morton	Calvin Weber	Bemidji, Minnesota
Pete Fenson	Shawn Rojeski	Joe Polo	Ryan Brunt	Bemidji, Minnesota
Christopher Plys (fourth)	Tyler George (skip)	Rich Ruohonen	Colin Hufman	Duluth, Minnesota
Geoff Goodland	Tim Solin	Pete Westberg	Ken Olson	Eau Claire, Wisconsin
Ryan Lemke	Nathan Gebert	John Lilla	Casey Konopacky	Medford, Wisconsin
Ethan Meyers	Kyle Kakela	Trevor Host	Cameron Ross	Duluth, Minnesota
Jim Milosevich	Dale Gibbs	Mark Lusche	Neil Kay	St. Paul, Minnesota
Greg Persinger	Nick Myers	Sean Murray	Chad Persinger	Fairbanks, Alaska
Jeremy Roe	Steve Day	Patrick Roe	Mark Hartman	Madison, Wisconsin
John Shuster	Jeff Isaacson	Jared Zezel	John Landsteiner	Duluth, Minnesota

=== Knockout results ===
The draw is listed as follows:

==== A event ====
First Knockout		Semifinals		Qualifier 1
(Minnesota) Pete Fenson	6
(Minnesota) Jim Milosevich	4	(Minnesota) Pete Fenson	4
(Switzerland) Alexander Attinger	5	(Switzerland) Alexander Attinger	2
(Massachusetts) Korey Dropkin	4			(Minnesota) Pete Fenson	5
(Wisconsin) Craig Brown	5			(Wisconsin) Ryan Lemke	3
(Alaska) Greg Persinger	2	(Wisconsin) Craig Brown	6
(Minnesota) Todd Birr	5	(Wisconsin) Ryan Lemke	7
(Wisconsin) Ryan Lemke	6

First Knockout		Semifinals		Qualifier 2
(Minnesota) John Shuster	5
(Minnesota) Ethan Meyers	3	(Minnesota) John Shuster	6
(Minnesota) Mike Farbelow	5	(Minnesota) Mike Farbelow	5
(Wisconsin) Jeremy Roe	2			(Minnesota) John Shuster	7
(Minnesota) Tyler George	6			(Minnesota) Tyler George	1
(Minnesota) Chris Dolan	1	(Minnesota) Tyler George	6
(Minnesota) Eric Fenson	2	(Wisconsin) Geoff Goodland	4
(Wisconsin) Geoff Goodland	9

==== B event ====
Second Knockout		Semifinals		Qualifier 3
(Minnesota) Jim Milosevich	3
(Massachusetts) Korey Dropkin	5	(Massachusetts) Korey Dropkin	6
(Alaska) Greg Persinger	3	(Minnesota) Todd Birr	7
(Minnesota) Todd Birr	6			(Minnesota) Todd Birr	5
				(Minnesota) Tyler George	8

Second Knockout		Semifinals		Qualifier 4
(Minnesota) Ethan Meyers	7
(Wisconsin) Jeremy Roe	6	(Minnesota) Ethan Meyers	7
(Minnesota) Chris Dolan	7	(Minnesota) Eric Fenson	2
(Minnesota) Eric Fenson	8			(Minnesota) Ethan Meyers	8
				(Wisconsin) Ryan Lemke	3

Second Knockout		Qualifier 5
(Switzerland) Alexander Attinger	6
(Wisconsin) Craig Brown	4	(Switzerland) Alexander Attinger	3
(Minnesota) Mike Farbelow	5	(Minnesota) Mike Farbelow	9
(Wisconsin) Geoff Goodland	2

==== C event ====
Third Knockout		Semifinals		Qualifier 6
(Minnesota) Jim Milosevich	3
(Alaska) Greg Persinger	5	(Alaska) Greg Persinger	4
		(Wisconsin) Craig Brown	5
				(Wisconsin) Craig Brown	5
				(Wisconsin) Ryan Lemke	2

Third Knockout		Semifinals		Qualifier 7
(Wisconsin) Jeremy Roe	6
(Minnesota) Chris Dolan	2	(Wisconsin) Jeremy Roe	8
		(Wisconsin) Geoff Goodland	2
				(Wisconsin) Jeremy Roe	6
				(Minnesota) Todd Birr	7

Third Knockout		Qualifier 8
(Massachusetts) Korey Dropkin	2
(Minnesota) Eric Fenson	6	(Minnesota) Eric Fenson	3
		(Switzerland) Alexander Attinger	6

=== Playoffs ===
The playoffs draw is listed as follows:

Quarterfinals
(Minnesota) Tyler George	4
(Wisconsin) Craig Brown	6
(Minnesota) Todd Birr	2
(Minnesota) John Shuster	5
(Minnesota) Pete Fenson	4
(Switzerland) Alexander Attinger	3
(Minnesota) Ethan Meyers	7
(Minnesota) Mike Farbelow	6

Semifinals
(Wisconsin) Craig Brown	5
(Minnesota) John Shuster	6
(Minnesota) Pete Fenson	8
(Minnesota) Ethan Meyers	2

Final
(Minnesota) John Shuster	5
(Minnesota) Pete Fenson	6

== Women ==
=== Teams ===
The teams are listed as follows:

Skip	Third	Second	Lead	Locale
Erika Brown	Debbie McCormick	Jessica Schultz	Ann Swisshelm	Madison, Wisconsin
Alexandra Carlson	Monica Walker	Kendall Moulton	Jordan Moulton	Minneapolis, Minnesota
Cory Christensen	Rebecca Funk	Anna Bauman	Sonja Bauman	Duluth, Minnesota
Brigid Ellig	Heather Van Sistine	Sara Shuster	Julia Boles	St. Paul, Minnesota
Jenna Haag	Chloe Pahl	Grace Gabower	Erin Wallace	Janesville, Wisconsin
Becca Hamilton	Molly Bonner	Tara Peterson	Sophie Brorson	Madison, Wisconsin
Patti Lank	Mackenzie Lank	Nina Spatola	Caitlin Maroldo	(New York (state)) Lewiston, New York
Charrissa Lin	Sherri Schummer	Emilia Juocys	Senja Lopac	New Haven, Connecticut
Joyance Meechai	Casey Cucchiarelli	Jen Cahak	Courtney Shaw	(New York (state)) New York, New York
Jill Mouzar	Stephanie LeDrew	Danielle Inglis	Hollie Nicol	Toronto, Ontario
Cassie Potter	Jamie Haskell	Jackie Lemke	Steph Sambor	St. Paul, Minnesota
Allison Pottinger	Nicole Joraanstad	Natalie Nicholson	Tabitha Peterson	St. Paul, Minnesota
Margie Smith	Norma O'Leary	Debbie Dexter	Shelly Kosal	St. Paul, Minnesota
Miranda Solem	Vicky Persenger	Karlie Koenig	Chelsea Solem	Cohasset, Minnesota
Amy Wright	Courtney George	Aileen Sormunen	Amanda McLean	Duluth, Minnesota

=== Round Robin Standings ===
Final Round Robin Standings

Key
Teams to Playoffs
Teams to Tiebreaker

Pool A	W	L
(Wisconsin) Erika Brown	4	0
(Wisconsin) Becca Hamilton	3	1
(Minnesota) Amy Wright	2	2
(Connecticut) Charrissa Lin	1	3
(New York (state)) Joyance Meechai	0	4

Pool A	W	L
(Minnesota) Allison Pottinger	4	0
(Wisconsin) Jenna Haag	2	2
(New York (state)) Patti Lank	2	2
(Minnesota) Alexandra Carlson	2	2
(Minnesota) Margie Smith	0	4

Pool A	W	L
(Ontario) Jill Mouzar	4	0
(Minnesota) Miranda Solem	3	1
(Minnesota) Cassandra Potter	1	2
(Minnesota) Cory Christensen	1	3
(Minnesota) Brigid Ellig	0	3

=== Tiebreaker ===
Team	Final
(Wisconsin) Jenna Haag	1
(New York (state)) Patti Lank	6

=== Playoffs ===
The playoffs draw is listed as follows:

Quarterfinals
(Wisconsin) Becca Hamilton	8
(Minnesota) Miranda Solem	4
(Minnesota) Allison Pottinger	3
(New York (state)) Patti Lank	4

Semifinals
(Ontario) Jill Mouzar	8
(Wisconsin) Becca Hamilton	0
(Wisconsin) Erika Brown	6
(New York (state)) Patti Lank	2

Final
(Ontario) Jill Mouzar	7
(Wisconsin) Erika Brown	8
