= 2012–13 curling season =

- Sport: Curling

Seasons
- ← 2011–12 2013–14 →

The 2012–13 curling season began at the end of August 2012 and ended in April 2013.

Note: In events with two genders, the men's tournament winners is listed before the women's tournament winners.

== CCA-sanctioned events ==
This section lists events sanctioned by and/or conducted by the Canadian Curling Association (CCA). The following events in bold have been confirmed by the CCA as are part of the 2012–13 Season of Champions programme.

Event	Winning team	Runner-up team
Canadian Mixed Curling Championship; Montreal, Quebec, Nov. 15–24	Ontario	Nova Scotia
The Dominion Curling Club Championship; Toronto, Ontario, Nov. 19–24	Alberta	Manitoba
The Dominion Curling Club Championship; Toronto, Ontario, Nov. 19–24	Ontario	Quebec
**Canada Cup of Curling**; Moose Jaw, Saskatchewan, Nov. 28 – Dec. 2	(Manitoba) Jeff Stoughton	(Ontario) Glenn Howard
**Canada Cup of Curling**; Moose Jaw, Saskatchewan, Nov. 28 – Dec. 2	(Saskatchewan) Stefanie Lawton	(Manitoba) Kaitlyn Lawes
**Continental Cup of Curling**; Penticton, British Columbia, Jan. 10–13	(Canada) (United States) North America	(United Nations) World
**Canadian Junior Curling Championships**; Fort McMurray, Alberta, Jan. 31 – Feb. 10	Manitoba	Alberta
**Canadian Junior Curling Championships**; Fort McMurray, Alberta, Jan. 31 – Feb. 10	British Columbia	Manitoba
**Tournament of Hearts**; Kingston, Ontario, Feb. 16–24	Ontario	Manitoba
**Tim Hortons Brier**; Edmonton, Alberta, Mar. 2–10	Northern Ontario	Manitoba
World Women's Curling Championship; Riga, Latvia, Mar. 16–24	Scotland	Sweden
Canadian Senior Curling Championships; Summerside, Prince Edward Island, Mar. 16–24	New Brunswick	Ontario
Canadian Senior Curling Championships; Summerside, Prince Edward Island, Mar. 16–24	Nova Scotia	Alberta
CIS/CCA University Curling Championships; Kamloops, British Columbia, Mar. 20–24	(Ontario) Waterloo Warriors	Alberta Golden Bears
CIS/CCA University Curling Championships; Kamloops, British Columbia, Mar. 20–24	Manitoba Bisons	Alberta Pandas
Canadian Wheelchair Curling Championship; Ottawa, Ontario, Mar. 24–31	Quebec	British Columbia
**World Men's Curling Championship**; Victoria, British Columbia, Mar. 30 – Apr. 7	Sweden	Canada
Canadian Masters Curling Championships; Thunder Bay, Ontario, Apr. 8–14	Alberta	Ontario
Canadian Masters Curling Championships; Thunder Bay, Ontario, Apr. 8–14	Ontario	Alberta
World Senior Curling Championships; Fredericton, New Brunswick, Apr. 13–20	Canada	New Zealand
World Senior Curling Championships; Fredericton, New Brunswick, Apr. 13–20	Canada	Austria
World Mixed Doubles Curling Championship; Fredericton, New Brunswick, Apr. 13–20	Hungary	Sweden

== Other events ==
Note: Events that were not placed on the CCA's list of CCA-sanctioned events are listed here.

Event	Winning team		Runner-up team
European Mixed Curling Championship; Erzurum, Turkey, Sep. 30 – Oct. 6	Scotland		Sweden
European Curling Championships — Group C Erzurum, Turkey, Oct. 5–10	C	Turkey	Croatia
European Curling Championships — Group C Erzurum, Turkey, Oct. 5–10	C	Belarus	Turkey
World Wheelchair Curling Championship Qualification; Lohja, Finland, Nov. 3–8	Norway		Finland
Pacific-Asia Curling Championships; Naseby, New Zealand, Nov. 18–25	China		Japan
Pacific-Asia Curling Championships; Naseby, New Zealand, Nov. 18–25	China		Japan
European Curling Championships; Karlstad, Sweden, Dec. 7–15	A	Sweden	Norway
European Curling Championships; Karlstad, Sweden, Dec. 7–15	A	Russia	Scotland
European Curling Championships; Karlstad, Sweden, Dec. 7–15	B	Finland	Latvia
European Curling Championships; Karlstad, Sweden, Dec. 7–15	B	Latvia	Norway
European Junior Curling Challenge; Prague, Czech Republic, Jan. 3–8	Italy		Denmark
European Junior Curling Challenge; Prague, Czech Republic, Jan. 3–8	Denmark		Hungary
Pacific-Asia Junior Curling Championships; Tokoro, Kitami, Japan, Jan. 10–16	China		South Korea
Pacific-Asia Junior Curling Championships; Tokoro, Kitami, Japan, Jan. 10–16	Japan		China
The Dominion All-Star Curling Skins Game; Rama, Ontario, Jan. 19–20	Team Glenn Howard		Team Kevin Koe
World Wheelchair Curling Championship; Sochi, Russia, Feb. 16–23	Canada		Sweden
World Junior Curling Championships; Sochi, Russia, Feb. 28 – Mar. 10	Scotland		Russia
World Junior Curling Championships; Sochi, Russia, Feb. 28 – Mar. 10	Russia		Scotland
Canadian Mixed Doubles Curling Trials; Leduc, Alberta, Mar. 14–17	(Quebec) Desjardins/Néron		(Saskatchewan) Kalthoff/Martin
Karuizawa International Curling Championship; Karuizawa, Japan, Apr. 18–21	(South Korea) Kim Chang-min		(Japan) Yusuke Morozumi
Karuizawa International Curling Championship; Karuizawa, Japan, Apr. 18–21	(Switzerland) Binia Feltscher-Beeli		(Japan) Ayumi Ogasawara

== World Curling Tour ==
Grand Slam events in bold.

=== Men's events ===
Week	Event	Winning skip	Runner-up skip
3	Baden Masters; Baden, Switzerland, Aug. 31 – Sept. 2	(Switzerland) Sven Michel	(Switzerland) Peter de Cruz
5	AMJ Campbell Shorty Jenkins Classic; Brockville, Ontario, Sept. 13–16	(Ontario) John Epping	(Manitoba) Jeff Stoughton
5	The Shoot-Out; Edmonton, Alberta, Sept. 13–16	(Alberta) Jamie King	(Alberta) Charley Thomas
5	Cloverdale Cash Spiel; Surrey, British Columbia, Sept. 14–16	(British Columbia) Brent Pierce	(British Columbia) Sean Geall
6	Radisson Blu Oslo Cup; Oslo, Norway, Sept. 20–23	(Sweden) Niklas Edin	(Finland) Markku Uusipaavalniemi
6	Point Optical Curling Classic; Saskatoon, Saskatchewan, Sept. 21–24	(Ontario) John Epping	(Alberta) Kevin Koe
7	Horizon Laser Vision Center Classic; Regina, Saskatchewan, Sept. 28 – Oct. 1	(China) Zou Dejia	(Saskatchewan) Brent Gedak
7	Prestige Hotels & Resorts Curling Classic; Vernon, British Columbia, Sept. 28 – Oct. 1	(British Columbia) Jim Cotter	(Alberta) Jamie King
8	Swiss Cup Basel; Basel, Switzerland, Oct. 4–7	(Sweden) Oskar Eriksson	(Switzerland) Sven Michel
8	StuSells Toronto Tankard; Toronto, Ontario, Oct. 5–8	(Manitoba) Jeff Stoughton	(Ontario) Joe Frans
8	Westcoast Curling Classic; New Westminster, British Columbia, Oct. 5–8	(Alberta) Kevin Martin	(British Columbia) Andrew Bilesky
8	Shamrock Shotgun; Edmonton, Alberta, Oct. 5–7	(Alberta) Danny Sherrard	(Alberta) Thomas Scoffin
9	Meyers Norris Penny Charity Classic; Medicine Hat, Alberta, Oct. 12–15	(Alberta) David Nedohin	(Saskatchewan) Randy Bryden
9	St. Paul Cash Spiel; St. Paul, Minnesota, Oct. 12–14	(United States) John Shuster	(United States) Todd Birr
10	Valley First Crown of Curling; Kamloops, British Columbia, Oct. 19–22	(British Columbia) Brent Pierce	(Alberta) Jamie King
10	Canad Inns Prairie Classic; Portage la Prairie, Manitoba, Oct. 19–22	(Alberta) Kevin Koe	(Alberta) Kevin Martin
10	The Flatiron Challenge at Lacombe; Lacombe, Alberta, Oct. 19–21	(Alberta) Robert Schlender	(Alberta) Parker Konschuh
11	Cactus Pheasant Classic; Brooks, Alberta, Oct. 25–28	(Alberta) Kevin Koe	(Manitoba) Mike McEwen
11	Challenge Chateau Cartier de Gatineau; Gatineau/Buckingham, Quebec, Oct. 25–28	(Nova Scotia) Mark Dacey	(Newfoundland and Labrador) Brad Gushue
11	Curling Masters Champéry; Champéry, Switzerland, Oct. 26–28	(Sweden) Marcus Hasselborg	(Switzerland) Peter de Cruz
11	Bernick's Miller Lite Open; Bemidji, Minnesota, Oct. 26–28	(Ontario) Al Hackner	(United States) Pete Fenson
12	Red Deer Curling Classic; Red Deer, Alberta, Nov. 2–5	(Alberta) Brendan Bottcher	(Alberta) Kevin Koe
13	Edinburgh International; Edinburgh, Scotland, Nov. 8–10	(Scotland) Tom Brewster	(Germany) John Jahr
13	Whites Drug Store Classic; Swan River, Manitoba, Nov. 9–12	(Manitoba) Mike McEwen	(Saskatchewan) Randy Bryden
13	Vancouver Island Shootout; Victoria, British Columbia, Nov. 9–12	(British Columbia) Jay Wakefield	(British Columbia) Neil Dangerfield
13	Courtesy Freight Northern Ontario Superspiel; Thunder Bay, Ontario, Nov. 9–11	(Ontario) Al Hackner	(Ontario) Craig Kochan
13	Original 16 WCT Bonspiel; Calgary, Alberta, Nov. 9–11	(Alberta) Steve Petryk	(Alberta) Robert Schlender
14	**The Masters Grand Slam of Curling**; Brantford, Ontario, Nov. 14–18	(Alberta) Kevin Koe	(British Columbia) Jim Cotter
14	Wainwright Roaming Buffalo Classic; Wainwright, Alberta, Nov. 16–19	(Washington (state)) Mark Johnson	(Alberta) Jamie King
14	Dauphin Clinic Pharmacy Classic; Dauphin, Manitoba, Nov. 16–19	(Saskatchewan) Randy Bryden	(Saskatchewan) Scott Bitz
15	Challenge Casino de Charlevoix; Clermont, Quebec, Nov. 22–25	(Switzerland) Peter de Cruz	(Ontario) Brad Jacobs
15	DEKALB Superspiel; Morris, Manitoba, Nov. 22–25	(Manitoba) William Lyburn	(Switzerland) Alexander Attinger
15	Seattle Cash Spiel; Seattle, Washington, Nov. 23–25	(United States) Todd Birr	(United States) Brady Clark
15	Coors Light Cash Spiel; Duluth, Minnesota, Nov. 23–25	(Ontario) Bryan Burgess	(United States) John Shuster
15	Spruce Grove Cashspiel; Spruce Grove, Alberta, Nov. 23–25	(Alberta) Les Rogers	(Alberta) Greg Keith
16	Madison Cash Spiel; Madison, Wisconsin, Nov. 30 – Dec. 2	(United States) Pete Fenson	(United States) John Shuster
18	**Canadian Open of Curling**; Kelowna, British Columbia, Dec. 12–16	(Ontario) Glenn Howard	(Ontario) Brad Jacobs
18	Iron Trail Motors Shoot-Out; Eveleth, Minnesota, Dec. 13–16	(United States) Tyler George	(United States) Todd Birr
18	Vic Open; Quebec City, Quebec, Dec. 14–16	(Quebec) Simon Dupuis	(Quebec) Philippe Lemay
21	Mercure Perth Masters; Perth, Scotland, Jan. 3–6	(Norway) Thomas Ulsrud	(Manitoba) Mike McEwen
24	**The National**; Port Hawkesbury, Nova Scotia, Jan. 23–27	(Manitoba) Jeff Stoughton	(Manitoba) Mike McEwen
24	German Masters; Hamburg, Germany, Jan. 25–27	(Scotland) David Murdoch	(Denmark) Rasmus Stjerne
30	Pomeroy Inn & Suites Prairie Showdown; Grande Prairie, Alberta, Mar. 14–17	(China) Liu Rui	(Manitoba) Mike McEwen
33	Victoria Curling Classic; Victoria, British Columbia, Mar. 21–24	(Sweden) Niklas Edin	(Manitoba) Mike McEwen
36	**The Players' Championship**; Toronto, Ontario, Apr. 16–21	(Ontario) Glenn Howard	(Manitoba) Mike McEwen
36	European Masters; St. Gallen, Switzerland, Apr. 17–20	(Sweden) Oskar Eriksson	(Switzerland) Sven Michel

=== Women's events ===
Week	Event	Winning skip	Runner-up skip
5	AMJ Campbell Shorty Jenkins Classic; Brockville, Ontario, Sept. 13–16	(Ontario) Tracy Horgan	(Scotland) Eve Muirhead
5	The Shoot-Out; Edmonton, Alberta, Sept. 13–16	(Manitoba) Kaitlyn Lawes	(Alberta) Crystal Webster
5	Cloverdale Cash Spiel; Surrey, British Columbia, Sept. 14–16	(China) Wang Bingyu	(British Columbia) Allison MacInnes
6	Radisson Blu Oslo Cup; Oslo, Norway, Sept. 20–23	(Canada) Sherry Middaugh	(Sweden) Margaretha Sigfridsson
7	Prestige Hotels & Resorts Curling Classic; Vernon, British Columbia, Sept. 28 – Oct. 1	(Alberta) Heather Nedohin	(Russia) Anna Sidorova
8	**Curlers Corner Autumn Gold Curling Classic**; Calgary, Alberta, Oct. 5–8	(Ontario) Sherry Middaugh	(Ontario) Rachel Homan
8	Shamrock Shotgun; Edmonton, Alberta, Oct. 5–7	(Japan) Satsuki Fujisawa	(South Korea) Kim Eun-jung
9	Atkins Curling Supplies Women's Classic; Winnipeg, Manitoba, Oct. 12–15	(Manitoba) Kate Cameron	(Manitoba) Kerri Einarson
9	Meyers Norris Penny Charity Classic; Medicine Hat, Alberta, Oct. 12–15	(Saskatchewan) Chantelle Eberle	(Alberta) Lisa Eyamie
9	Women's Masters Basel; Basel, Switzerland, Oct. 12–14	(Sweden) Margaretha Sigfridsson	(Switzerland) Silvana Tirinzoni
9	St. Paul Cash Spiel; St. Paul, Minnesota, Oct. 12–14	(New York (state)) Patti Lank	(Minnesota) Margie Smith
10	**Manitoba Lotteries Women's Curling Classic**; Winnipeg, Manitoba, Oct. 19–22	(Saskatchewan) Stefanie Lawton	(Ontario) Rachel Homan
10	Valley First Crown of Curling; Kamloops, British Columbia, Oct. 19–22	(China) Wang Bingyu	(Denmark) Lene Nielsen
11	Challenge Chateau Cartier de Gatineau; Gatineau/Buckingham, Quebec, Oct. 25–28	(Ontario) Julie Reddick	(Ontario) Cathy Auld
12	Royal LePage OVCA Women's Fall Classic; Kemptville, Ontario, Nov. 1–4	(Ontario) Rachel Homan	(Ontario) Allison Nimik
12	Stockholm Ladies Cup; Stockholm, Sweden, Nov. 1–4	(Sweden) Anette Norberg	(Sweden) Anna Hasselborg
12	Red Deer Curling Classic; Red Deer, Alberta, Nov. 2–5	(Manitoba) Chelsea Carey	(Manitoba) Kaitlyn Lawes
13	**Colonial Square Ladies Classic**; Saskatoon, Saskatchewan, Nov. 9–12	(Saskatchewan) Stefanie Lawton	(Manitoba) Chelsea Carey
13	Vancouver Island Shootout; Victoria, British Columbia, Nov. 9–12	(British Columbia) Roberta Kuhn	(Alberta) Heather Jensen
13	Courtesy Freight Northern Ontario Superspiel; Thunder Bay, Ontario, Nov. 9–11	(Ontario) Krista McCarville	(Ontario) Ashley Kallos
14	**The Masters Grand Slam of Curling**; Brantford, Ontario, Nov. 14–18	(Ontario) Rachel Homan	(Manitoba) Chelsea Carey
15	DEKALB Superspiel; Morris, Manitoba, Nov. 22–25	(Manitoba) Darcy Robertson	(Manitoba) Barb Spencer
15	Molson Cash Spiel; Duluth, Minnesota, Nov. 23–25	(Ontario) Krista McCarville	(Wisconsin) Becca Hamilton
15	Spruce Grove Cashspiel; Spruce Grove, Alberta, Nov. 23–25	(Alberta) Tiffany Steuber	(Alberta) Holly Whyte
16	Boundary Ford Curling Classic; Lloydminster, Alberta, Nov. 30 – Dec. 3	(Alberta) Renée Sonnenberg	(Alberta) Casey Scheidegger
16	International ZO women's tournament Wetzikon, Switzerland, Nov. 30 – Dec. 2	(Switzerland) Michèle Jäggi	(Switzerland) Mirjam Ott
16	Madison Cash Spiel; Madison, Wisconsin, Nov. 30 – Dec. 2	(Wisconsin) Erika Brown	(Ontario) Jill Mouzar
18	Iron Trail Motors Shoot-Out; Eveleth, Minnesota, Dec. 14–16	(Alberta) Jessie Kaufman	(Minnesota) Allison Pottinger
22	International Bernese Ladies Cup; Bern, Switzerland, Jan. 11–13	(Switzerland) Silvana Tirinzoni	(Denmark) Lene Nielsen
23	Glynhill Ladies International; Glasgow, Scotland, Jan. 18–20	(Switzerland) Binia Feltscher	(Canada) Heather Nedohin
30	Pomeroy Inn & Suites Prairie Showdown; Grande Prairie, Alberta, Mar. 14–17	(Switzerland) Mirjam Ott	(Ontario) Tracy Horgan
36	**The Players' Championship**; Toronto, Ontario, Apr. 16–21	(Scotland) Eve Muirhead	(Sweden) Margaretha Sigfridsson

== WCT Order of Merit rankings ==
Men

as of Week 36
#	Skip	Points
1	(Ontario) Glenn Howard	502.540
2	(Manitoba) Mike McEwen	435.985
3	(Sweden) Niklas Edin	397.980
4	(Alberta) Kevin Koe	377.200
5	(Alberta) Kevin Martin	372.930
6	(Manitoba) Jeff Stoughton	364.587
7	(Ontario) Brad Jacobs	301.379
8	(Ontario) John Epping	296.070
9	(Newfoundland and Labrador) Brad Gushue	250.371
10	(Norway) Thomas Ulsrud	224.564

Women

as of Week 36
#	Skip	Points
1	(Manitoba) Jennifer Jones	402.150
2	(Saskatchewan) Stefanie Lawton	334.785
3	(Scotland) Eve Muirhead	302.870
4	(Alberta) Heather Nedohin	298.665
5	(Sweden) Margaretha Sigfridsson	273.640
6	(Ontario) Rachel Homan	268.595
7	(Ontario) Sherry Middaugh	258.735
8	(Switzerland) Mirjam Ott	248.555
9	(Russia) Anna Sidorova	238.505
10	(Manitoba) Chelsea Carey	231.700

== WCT Money List ==
Men

as of Week 36
#	Skip	$ (CAD)
1	(Alberta) Kevin Koe	110,700
2	(Manitoba) Mike McEwen	108,861
3	(Manitoba) Jeff Stoughton	95,400
4	(Ontario) Glenn Howard	72,000
5	(Alberta) Kevin Martin	70,000
6	(Sweden) Niklas Edin	58,815
7	(Ontario) Brad Jacobs	57,100
8	(Newfoundland and Labrador) Brad Gushue	47,726
9	(British Columbia) Jim Cotter	43,000
10	(Ontario) John Epping	35,400

Women

as of Week 36
#	Skip	$ (CAD)
1	(Ontario) Rachel Homan	60,800
2	(Saskatchewan) Stefanie Lawton	46,400
3	(Manitoba) Chelsea Carey	39,300
4	(Scotland) Eve Muirhead	38,582
5	(Manitoba) Jennifer Jones	32,200
6	(Sweden) Margaretha Sigfridsson	32,033
7	(Alberta) Shannon Kleibrink	31,900
8	(Russia) Anna Sidorova	31,556
9	(Ontario) Sherry Middaugh	31,243
10	(Switzerland) Silvana Tirinzoni	30,011

== The Dominion MA Cup ==
The Dominion MA Cup (presented by TSN) was contested in the 2012–13 season. The Cup was awarded to the Canadian Curling Association Member Association (MA) who has had the most success during the season in CCA-sanctioned events. Events included the Canadian mixed championship, men's and women's juniors championships, the Scotties, the Brier, the men's and women's senior championships and the national wheelchair championship. Points were awarded based on placement in each of the events, with the top association receiving 14 points, the 2nd place team with 13, etc.

=== Standings ===
Final standings

Rank	Member Association	CMCC	CWJCC	CMJCC	Scotties	Brier	CWSCC	CMSCC	CWhCC	Total Pts.	Avg. Pts.
1	Ontario	14	12	11	14	12	5	13	8	89	11.125
2	Manitoba	5	13	14	13	13	12	8	10	88	11.000
3	Nova Scotia	13	8	12	8	4	14	10	7	76	9.500
3	Alberta	8	5	13	3	10	13	12	12	76	9.500
5	Quebec	12	7	7	6	9	11	9	14	75	9.375
6	New Brunswick	11	9	9	9	7	9	14	5	73	9.125
7	British Columbia	7	14	8	12	3	6	7	13	70	8.750
8	Saskatchewan	10	10	10	10	6	7	6	6	65	8.125
9	Northern Ontario	9	3	5	n/a	14	10	4	11	56	8.000
10	Newfoundland and Labrador	1	6	4	4	11	8	5	9	48	6.000
11	Prince Edward Island	6	2	3	7	5	3	11	n/a	37	5.286
12	Northwest Territories	4	4	2	5	8	4	3	n/a	30	4.286
13	Yukon	3	11	6	2	2	2	2	n/a	28	4.000
14	Nunavut	2	1	1	n/a	n/a	1	1	n/a	6	1.200

Preceded by 2011–12	2012–13 curling season September 2012 – April 2013	Succeeded by 2013–14
