= Vic Open (curling) =

Former World Curling Tour event

The Vic Open is an annual curling tournament that takes place at the Club de curling Victoria in Quebec City, Quebec. It is held in a round-robin format.

The event was once a World Curling Tour event in 2012 and 2013. Today, it is part of the Quebec Provincial Circuit. There is an open and a seniors division.

== Past champions ==
Only skip's name is displayed.

| Year | Winning team | Runner up team | Purse (CAD) |
|---|---|---|---|
| 2012 | (Quebec) Simon Dupuis | (Quebec) Philippe Lemay | $10,000 |
| 2013 | (Quebec) Martin Ferland | (Quebec) Philippe Lemay | $12,500 |
| 2024 | (Quebec) François Roberge | (Quebec) Jean-Sébastien Roy | $5,200 |
| 2025 | (Quebec) Jean-Michel Ménard | (Quebec) Julien Tremblay | $5,200 |
