= Spruce Grove Cashspiel =

Former World Curling Tour event

The Spruce Grove Cashspiel was an annual bonspiel, or curling tournament, that took place at the Spruce Grove Curling Club in Spruce Grove, Alberta. The tournament was one of the development series events introduced on the World Curling Tour during the 2012–13 curling season. The tournament was held in a round robin format. The tournament was started in 2012 as part of the World Curling Tour.

== Past champions ==
Only skip's name is displayed.

=== Men ===
Year	Winning team	Runner up team	Purse (CAD)
2012	(Alberta) Les Rogers	(Alberta) Greg Keith	$8,000
2013	(Alberta) Brendan Bottcher	(Alberta) Jamie King	$10,300
2014	(South Korea) Kim Seung-min	(Alberta) Mike Hutchings	$2,800

=== Women ===
Year	Winning team	Runner up team	Purse (CAD)
2012	(Alberta) Tiffany Steuber	(Alberta) Holly Whyte	$8,000
2013	(Alberta) Amy Nixon	(Alberta) Nicky Kaufman	$8,000
2014	(Alberta) Shannon Kleibrink	(Alberta) Heather Nedohin	$12,500
