= Curl Mesabi Classic =

World Curling Tour event

The Curl Mesabi Classic (previously known as the Curl Mesabi Cash Spiel (2007, 2010-2011), Iron Trail Motors Shoot-Out @ Curl Mesabi (2012) and the Super One Shoot-out @ Curl Mesabi (2008)) is an annual bonspiel, or curling tournament, that takes place at Curl Mesabi's venue, the Range Recreation and Civic Center, in Eveleth, Minnesota. The tournament is held in a round-robin format. The men's tournament, started c. 2003, and joined the World Curling Tour in 2007. Women were allowed to participate in the men's tournament until 2011, when a separate women's tournament was created. The women's event was not held in 2013. The event is part of the United States Order of Merit System, used to determine the teams which will directly qualify to the National Championships each year. The bonspiel is also part of the Great Lakes Curling Tour. The event's coordinator is Phill Drobnick.

In 2022, the winning teams earned a bye to the US National Championships.

== Past champions ==
Only skip's name is displayed.

=== Men ===
Year	Winning team	Runner up team	Purse (USD)
2007	(Minnesota) Pete Fenson	(Wisconsin) Craig Brown	$14,000
2008	(Minnesota) Tyler George	(Minnesota) Cassandra Potter (Note: Although Potter skipped a women's team, she was allowed to participate and became runner-up.)	$20,000
2009	(Minnesota) John Shuster	(Manitoba) Andrew Wickman	$20,000
2010	(Ontario) Jeff Currie	(Minnesota) John Benton	$17,200
2011	(Wisconsin) Craig Brown	(Minnesota) Todd Birr	$17,200
2012	(Minnesota) Tyler George	(Minnesota) Todd Birr	$21,500
2013	(Ontario) Bryan Burgess	(Switzerland) Sven Michel	$21,500
2014	(Minnesota) Mike Farbelow	(Ontario) Al Hackner	$22,000
2015	(Minnesota) John Shuster	(Ontario) Dylan Johnston	$21,000
2016	(Minnesota) Heath McCormick	(Minnesota) John Shuster	$26,000
2017	(Washington (state)) Rich Ruohonen	(Minnesota) Joe Polo	$18,000
2018	(Minnesota) Rich Ruohonen	(Minnesota) Mark Fenner	$18,000
2019 (Note: Event included the 2019 Americas Challenge as one of its groups, with the Challenge winner (Team Ruohonen) earning a spot in the playoffs.)	(Minnesota) Korey Dropkin	(Minnesota) Rich Ruohonen	$14,000
2020	Cancelled		
2021	(Minnesota) Rich Ruohonen	(Minnesota) John Shuster	$21,000
2022	(Minnesota) Korey Dropkin	(Minnesota) Daniel Casper	$21,000
2023	(Ontario) Tanner Horgan	(Minnesota) Daniel Casper	$25,000

=== Women ===
Year	Winning team	Runner up team	Purse (USD)
2011	(Minnesota) Cassandra Potter	(Minnesota) Allison Pottinger	$10,000
2012	(Alberta) Jessie Kaufman	(Minnesota) Allison Pottinger	$12,500
2014	(Ontario) Tracy Horgan	(Wisconsin) Erika Brown	$11,000
2015	(Ontario) Krista McCarville	(Minnesota) Cory Christensen	$9,000
2016	(Alberta) Nadine Chyz	(Minnesota) Cassandra Potter	$11,000
2017	(Alberta) Kelsey Rocque	(Minnesota) Nina Roth	$12,000
2018	(Ontario) Krista McCarville	(Quebec) Laurie St-Georges	$15,000
2019 (Note: Event included the 2019 Americas Challenge as one of its groups, with the Challenge winner (Team Roth) earning a spot in the playoffs.)	(Ontario) Krista McCarville	(Alberta) Laura Walker	$16,000
2020	Cancelled		
2021	(Minnesota) Tabitha Peterson	(Minnesota) Cory Christensen	$21,000
2022	(Minnesota) Tabitha Peterson	(Ontario) Krista McCarville	$20,000
2023	(Quebec) Laurie St-Georges	(North Dakota) Miranda Scheel	$25,000
