= Shamrock Shotgun =

Former World Curling Tour event

The Shamrock Shotgun was an annual bonspiel, or curling tournament, that took place at the Shamrock Curling Club in Edmonton, Alberta, Canada. The tournament was held in a round robin format. The tournament was started in 2012 as part of the World Curling Tour and was last held in 2014.

The event was a re-incarnation of the previous "Shamrock Shotgun," which used to be held at the end of the season and featured top teams from across the city. The event was brought back for the 2012–13 season, but was held in the fall instead of in the spring. The event was a lower-end WCT event, created as a "regional development series". Almost every team entered in the 2012 event was from Alberta (most from the Edmonton area), save for a few international teams and a few from out of the province.

== Past champions ==
Only skip's name is displayed.

=== Men ===
| Year | Winning team | Runner up team | Purse (CAD) |
|---|---|---|---|
| 2012 | (Alberta) Danny Sherrard | (Alberta) Thomas Scoffin | $8,000 |
| 2013 | (Alberta) Tom Appelman | (Alberta) Mike Hutchings | $9,400 |
| 2014 | (Alberta) Mick Lizmore | (Alberta) Robert Schlender | $12,150 |

=== Women ===
| Year | Winning team | Runner up team | Purse (CAD) |
|---|---|---|---|
| 2012 | (Japan) Satsuki Fujisawa | (South Korea) Kim Eun-jung | $8,000 |
| 2013 | (China) Jiang Yilun | (Alberta) Jessie Kaufman | $8,500 |
| 2014 | (Alberta) Nicky Kaufman | (Switzerland) Michèle Jäggi | $12,150 |
