= 2012 Westcoast Curling Classic =

World Curling Tour event

- Host city: New Westminster, British Columbia
- Arena: Royal City Curling Club
- Dates: October 5–8
- Winner: (Alberta) Kevin Martin
- Curling club: Saville Sports Centre, Edmonton
- Skip: Kevin Martin
- Third: John Morris
- Second: Marc Kennedy
- Lead: Ben Hebert
- Finalist: (British Columbia) Andrew Bilesky

The 2012 Westcoast Curling Classic was held from October 5 to 8 at the Royal City Curling Club in New Westminster, British Columbia as part of the 2012–13 World Curling Tour. The event was held in a round robin format, and the purse for the event was CAD$52,000, of which the winner, Kevin Martin, received CAD$14,000. Martin defeated Andrew Bilesky in the final with a score of 8–6, earning his third consecutive title and his seventh title overall at the Westcoast Curling Classic.

== Teams ==
The teams are listed as follows:

Skip	Third	Second	Lead	Locale
Andrew Bilesky	Stephen Kopf	Derek Errington	Aaron Watson	Vancouver, British Columbia
Brendan Bottcher	Micky Lizmore	Bradley Thiessen	Karrick Martin	Edmonton, Alberta
Brady Clark	Sean Beighton	Darren Lehto	Steve Lundeen	(Washington (state)) Seattle, Washington
Jim Cotter	Jason Gunnlaugson	Tyrel Griffith	Rick Sawatsky	Kelowna/Vernon, British Columbia
Sean Geall	Jay Peachey	Sebastien Robillard	Mark Olson	New Westminster, British Columbia
Kevin Koe	Pat Simmons	Carter Rycroft	Nolan Thiessen	Edmonton, Alberta
Steve Laycock	Kirk Muyres	Colton Flasch	Dallan Muyres	Saskatoon, Saskatchewan
William Lyburn	James Kirkness	Alex Forrest	Tyler Forrest	Winnipeg, Manitoba
Kevin Martin	John Morris	Marc Kennedy	Ben Hebert	Edmonton, Alberta
Ken McArdle	Jared Bowles	Dylan Somerton	Michael Horita	New Westminster, British Columbia
Yusuke Morozumi	Tsuyoshi Yamaguchi	Tetsuro Shimizu	Kosuke Morozumi	Karuizawa, Japan
David Nedohin	Colin Hodgson	Tom Sallows	Mike Westlund	Edmonton, Alberta
Dan Petryk (fourth)	Steve Petryk (skip)	Roland Robinson	Thomas Usselman	Calgary, Alberta
Brent Pierce	Jeff Richard	Kevin Recksiedler	Grant Dezura	New Westminster, British Columbia
Randie Shen	Brendon Liu	Nicolas Hsu	Justin Hsu	Taipei, Chinese Taipei
Charley Thomas	J. D. Lind	Dominic Daemen	Matthew Ng	Calgary, Alberta
Brock Virtue	Braeden Moskowy	Chris Schille	D. J Kidby	Regina, Saskatchewan
Michael Johnson (fourth)	Paul Cseke	Jay Wakefield (skip)	John Cullen	New Westminster, British Columbia

== Round robin standings ==
Final Round Robin Standings

Key
Teams to Playoffs
Teams to Tiebreakers

Pool A	W	L
(Manitoba) William Lyburn	4	1
(Alberta) Kevin Martin	4	1
(British Columbia) Brent Pierce	4	1
(British Columbia) Ken McArdle	1	4
(Japan) Yusuke Morozumi	1	4
(Washington (state)) Brady Clark	1	4

Pool B	W	L
(Alberta) Brendan Bottcher	4	1
(Alberta) Kevin Koe	4	1
(British Columbia) Sean Geall	3	2
(Alberta) David Nedohin	2	3
(British Columbia) Jay Wakefield	2	3
(Saskatchewan) Steve Laycock	0	5

Pool C	W	L
(British Columbia) Andrew Bilesky	4	1
(British Columbia) Jim Cotter	3	2
(Alberta) Steve Petryk	3	2
(Alberta) Charley Thomas	3	2
(Saskatchewan) Brock Virtue	2	3
(Chinese Taipei) Randie Shen	0	5

== Tiebreakers ==
Team	Final
(Alberta) Charley Thomas	4
(British Columbia) Sean Geall	6

Team	Final
(British Columbia) Jim Cotter	9
(Alberta) Steve Petryk	4

== Playoffs ==
Quarterfinals
(Alberta) Kevin Martin	7
(British Columbia) Sean Geall	1
(Alberta) Brendan Bottcher	4
(British Columbia) Brent Pierce	5
(British Columbia) Andrew Bilesky	6
(British Columbia) Jim Cotter	2
(Alberta) Kevin Koe	7
(Manitoba) William Lyburn	5

Semifinals
(Alberta) Kevin Martin	5
(British Columbia) Brent Pierce	2
(British Columbia) Andrew Bilesky	6
(Alberta) Kevin Koe	5

Final
(Alberta) Kevin Martin	8
(British Columbia) Andrew Bilesky	6
