= 2013 Mercure Perth Masters =

- Host city: Perth, Scotland
- Arena: Dewars Centre
- Dates: January 3–6
- Winner: (Norway) Thomas Ulsrud
- Skip: Thomas Ulsrud
- Third: Torger Nergård
- Second: Christoffer Svae
- Lead: Håvard Vad Petersson
- Finalist: (Canada) Mike McEwen

The 2013 Mercure Perth Masters were held from January 3 to 6 at the Dewars Centre in Perth, Scotland as part of the 2012–13 World Curling Tour. The event was held in a triple knockout format, and the purse for the event was GBP£17,160, of which the winner, Thomas Ulsrud, received GBP£6,000. Ulsrud defeated Mike McEwen of Canada in the final with a score of 7–2.

== Teams ==
The teams are listed as follows:

Skip	Third	Second	Lead	Locale
Tom Brewster	Greg Drummond	Scott Andrews	Michael Goodfellow	Aberdeen, Scotland
Robin Brydone	James Carswell	Thomas Halder	Calum Greenwood	Perth, Scotland
Sandy Christie	Garry Rutherford	Stuart Stark	Stuart Nicol	Perth, Scotland
Niklas Edin	Sebastian Kraupp	Fredrik Lindberg	Viktor Kjäll	Karlstad, Sweden
David Edwards	John Penny	Scott Macleod	Colin Campbell	Aberdeen, Scotland
Kristian Lindström (fourth)	Oskar Eriksson (skip)	Markus Eriksson	Christoffer Sundgren	Karlstad, Sweden
Pete Fenson	Shawn Rojeski	Joe Polo	Ryan Brunt	(United States) Bemidji, Minnesota
Mario Freiberger	Sven Iten	Pascal Eicher	Rainer Kobler	Zug, Switzerland
Logan Gray	Ross Paterson	Alasdair Guthrie	Richard Woods	Stirling, Scotland
Brad Gushue	Adam Casey	Brett Gallant	Geoff Walker	(Canada) St. John's, Newfoundland and Labrador
Grant Hardie	Jay McWilliam	Hammy McMillan Jr.	Billy Morton	Dumfries, Scotland
Pascal Hess	Yves Hess	Florian Meister	Stefan Meienberg	Zug, Switzerland
Steve Laycock	Kirk Muyres	Colton Flasch	Dallan Muyres	(Canada) Saskatoon, Saskatchewan
Liu Rui	Xu Xiaoming	Zang Jialiang	Ba Dexin	Harbin, China
Ewan MacDonald	Duncan Fernie	Ally Fraser	Euan Byers	Perth, Scotland
Mike McEwen	B.J. Neufeld	Matt Wozniak	Denni Neufeld	(Canada) Winnipeg, Manitoba
Sven Michel	Claudio Pätz	Sandro Trolliet	Simon Gempeler	Adelboden, Switzerland
Yusuke Morozumi	Tsuyoshi Yamaguchi	Tetsuro Shimizu	Kosuke Morozumi	Karuizawa, Japan
Glen Muirhead	David Reid	Steven Mitchell	Kerr Drummond	Perth, Scotland
Bent Ramsfjell	Flemming Davanger	Bendik Ramsfjell	Ole Davanger	Oslo, Norway
Tomi Rantamaki	Jussi Uusipaavalniemi	Peeka Peura	Jermu Pollanen	Helsinki & Hyvinkää, Finland
Hammy McMillan (fourth)	Moray Combe	Sandy Reid (skip)	Sandy Gilmour	Stranraer, Scotland
Graham Shaw	Brian Binnie	Richard Goldie	Rob Niven	Perth, Scotland
Graham Shedden	Chay Telfer	Robert Tait	Graeme Hay	Howwood, Scotland
David Šik	Radek Boháč	Karel Uher	Milan Polívka	Prague, Czech Republic
Kyle Smith	Thomas Muirhead	Kyle Waddell	Cammy Smith	Perth, Scotland
Warwick Smith	David Smith	Alan Smith	Ross Hepburn	Perth, Scotland
Torkil Svensgaard	Martin Udh Gronbech	Morten Berg Thomsen	Daniel Dalgaard Abrahamsen	Hvidovre, Denmark
Alexey Tselousov	Alexey Stukalsky	Andrey Drozdov	Artur Razhabov	Moscow, Russia
Thomas Ulsrud	Torger Nergård	Christoffer Svae	Håvard Vad Petersson	Oslo, Norway
Jaap van Dorp	Carlo Glasbergen	Miles MacLure	Joey Bruinsma	Benthuizen, Netherlands
Murray Young	Blair Fraser	Ruairidh Greenwood	Ian Copland	Perth, Scotland

== Knockout results ==
The draw is listed as follows:

=== A event ===
First Knockout
(Sweden) Niklas Edin	9
(Scotland) Robin Brydone	4
(Scotland) David Edwards	5
(Canada) Steve Laycock	2
(China) Liu Rui	6
(Finland) Tomi Rantamaki	4
(Scotland) Grant Hardie	4
(Scotland) Graham Shedden	5
(Switzerland) Sven Michel	3
(Russia) Alexey Tselousov	6
(Scotland) Glen Muirhead	7
(Japan) Yusuke Morozumi	5
(United States) Pete Fenson	6
(Scotland) Logan Gray	5
(Scotland) Graham Shaw	5
(Norway) Thomas Ulsrud	8

Quarterfinals
(Sweden) Niklas Edin	2
(Scotland) David Edwards	8
(China) Liu Rui	8
(Scotland) Graham Shedden	1
(Russia) Alexey Tselousov	3
(Scotland) Glen Muirhead	4
(United States) Pete Fenson	2
(Norway) Thomas Ulsrud	7

Semifinals
(Scotland) David Edwards	7
(China) Liu Rui	2
(Scotland) Glen Muirhead	4
(Norway) Thomas Ulsrud	7

Qualifier 1
(Scotland) David Edwards	3
(Norway) Thomas Ulsrud	4

First Knockout
(Scotland) Tom Brewster	7
(Norway) Bent Ramsfjell	2
(Scotland) Sandy Reid	4
(Switzerland) Pascal Hess	7
(Sweden) Oskar Eriksson	4
(Scotland) Kyle Smith	6
(Denmark) Torkil Svensgaard	4
(Canada) Brad Gushue	8
(Scotland) Sandy Christie	8
(Czech Republic) David Šik	4
(Netherlands) Jaap van Dorp	4
(Scotland) Warwick Smith	6
(Scotland) Ewan MacDonald	4
(Switzerland) Mario Freiberger	7
(Scotland) Murray Young	1
(Canada) Mike McEwen	8

Quarterfinals
(Scotland) Tom Brewster	5
(Switzerland) Pascal Hess	7
(Scotland) Kyle Smith	7
(Canada) Brad Gushue	6
(Scotland) Sandy Christie	4
(Scotland) Warwick Smith	5
(Switzerland) Mario Freiberger	4
(Canada) Mike McEwen	7

Semifinals
(Switzerland) Pascal Hess	6
(Scotland) Kyle Smith	1
(Scotland) Warwick Smith	4
(Canada) Mike McEwen	5

Qualifier 2
(Switzerland) Pascal Hess	1
(Canada) Mike McEwen	8

=== B event ===
Second Knockout
(Scotland) Robin Brydone	3
(Canada) Steve Laycock	6
(Finland) Toni Rantamaki	7
(Scotland) Grant Hardie	6
(Switzerland) Sven Michel	3
(Japan) Yusuke Morozumi	6
(Scotland) Logan Gray	9
(Scotland) Graham Shaw	1

Quarterfinals
(Canada) Steve Laycock	6
(Finland) Toni Rantamaki	2
(Japan) Yusuke Morozumi	8
(Scotland) Logan Gray	6

Semifinals
(Canada) Steve Laycock	1
(Scotland) Kyle Smith	7
(Japan) Yusuke Morozumi	3
(Scotland) Warwick Smith	6

To Qualifier 3
(Scotland) Kyle Smith	2
(Scotland) Warwick Smith	7
Qualifier 3
(Scotland) Warwick Smith	4
(Canada) Brad Gushue	5

Second Knockout		Semifinals		To Qualifier 3
(Scotland) Tom Brewster	3
(Canada) Brad Gushue	7	(Canada) Brad Gushue	7
(Scotland) Sandy Christie	7	(Scotland) Sandy Christie	3
(Switzerland) Mario Freiberger	2			(Canada) Brad Gushue	7
				(Switzerland) Pascal Hess	0

Second Knockout		Semifinals		To Qualifier 4
(Sweden) Niklas Edin	8
(Scotland) Graham Shedden	2	(Sweden) Niklas Edin	6
(Russia) Alexey Tselousov	2	(United States) Pete Fenson	3
(United States) Pete Fenson	8			(Sweden) Niklas Edin	3
				(Scotland) David Edwards	4

Second Knockout
(Norway) Bent Anund Ramsfjell	3
(Scotland) Sandy Reid	11
(Sweden) Oskar Eriksson	8
(Denmark) Torkil Svensgaard	3
(Czech Republic) David Sik	7
(Netherlands) Jaap van Dorp	2
(Scotland) Ewan MacDonald	6
(Scotland) Murray Young	4

Quarterfinals
(Scotland) Sandy Reid	7
(Sweden) Oskar Eriksson	4
(Czech Republic) David Sik	2
(Scotland) Ewan MacDonald	7

Semifinals
(China) Liu Rui	7
(Scotland) Sandy Reid	2
(Scotland) Glen Muirhead	3
(Scotland) Ewan MacDonald	5

To Qualifier 4
(China) Liu Rui	4
(Scotland) Ewan MacDonald	5
Qualifier 4
(Scotland) David Edwards	3
(Scotland) Ewan MacDonald	5

=== C event ===
Third Knockout
(Scotland) Robin Brydone	4
(Scotland) Grant Hardie	12
(Switzerland) Sven Michel	2
(Scotland) Graham Shaw	8

Quarterfinals
(Scotland) Tom Brewster	3
(Scotland) Grant Hardie	7
(Switzerland) Mario Freiberger	8
(Scotland) Graham Shaw	3

Semifinals
(Scotland) Grant Hardie	4
(Switzerland) Mario Freiberger	3

Qualifier 5
(Scotland) Grant Hardie	7
(Scotland) Warwick Smith	4

Third Knockout
(Finland) Tomi Rantamaki	5
(Scotland) Logan Gray	4

Quarterfinals
(Scotland) Sandy Reid	6
(Scotland) Glen Muirhead	8
(Finland) Tomi Rantamaki	7
(Scotland) Sandy Christie	0

Semifinals
(Scotland) Glen Muirhead	7
(Scotland) Kyle Smith	2
(Finland) Tomi Rantamaki	9
(Sweden) Niklas Edin	5

Qualifier 6
(Scotland) Glen Muirhead	4
(Finland) Tomi Rantamaki	7

Third Knockout
(Sweden) Oskar Eriksson	8
(Czech Republic) David Sik	4

Quarterfinals
(Sweden) Oskar Eriksson	8
(United States) Pete Fenson	1
(Canada) Steve Laycock	5
(Japan) Yusuke Morozumi	9

Semifinals
(Sweden) Oskar Eriksson	6
(Switzerland) Pascal Hess	5
(Japan) Yusuke Morozumi	4
(China) Liu Rui	7

Qualifier 7
(Sweden) Oskar Eriksson	1
(China) Liu Rui	7

Third Knockout
(Norway) Bent Ramsfjell	5
(Denmark) Torkil Svensgaard	6
(Netherlands) Jaap van Dorp	7
(Scotland) Murray Young	5

Quarterfinals
(Scotland) Graham Shedden	5
(Denmark) Torkil Svensgaard	3
(Russia) Alexey Tselousov	8
(Netherlands) Jaap van Dorp	3

Semifinals
(Scotland) Graham Shedden	4
(Russia) Alexey Tselousov	5

Qualifier 8
(Russia) Alexey Tselousov	5
(Scotland) David Edwards	4

== Playoffs ==
Quarterfinals
(Norway) Thomas Ulsrud	8
(Russia) Alexey Tselousov	1
(Canada) Brad Gushue	5
(Finland) Tomi Rantamaki	1
(Scotland) Ewan MacDonald	6
(Scotland) Grant Hardie	2
(Canada) Mike McEwen	7
(China) Liu Rui	3

Semifinals
(Norway) Thomas Ulsrud	5
(Canada) Brad Gushue	4
(Scotland) Ewan MacDonald	5
(Canada) Mike McEwen	6

Final
(Norway) Thomas Ulsrud	7
(Canada) Mike McEwen	2
