= 2012 Shamrock Shotgun =

World Curling Tour event

- Host city: Edmonton, Alberta
- Arena: Shamrock Curling Club
- Dates: October 5–7
- Men's winner: (Alberta) Danny Sherrard
- Skip: Danny Sherrard
- Third: Brandon Klassen
- Second: Scott McClements
- Lead: Todd Kaasten
- Finalist: (Alberta) Thomas Scoffin
- Women's winner: (Japan) Satsuki Fujisawa
- Skip: Satsuki Fujisawa
- Third: Miyo Ichikawa
- Second: Emi Shimizu
- Lead: Miyuki Sato
- Finalist: (South Korea) Kim Eun-jung

The 2012 Shamrock Shotgun was held from October 5 to 7 at the Shamrock Curling Club in Edmonton, Alberta as part of the 2012–13 World Curling Tour. The event was held in a round robin format. The purses for the men's and women's events are CAD$8,500 each, and the winners of each event, Danny Sherrard and Satsuki Fujisawa, received CAD$2,000. Sherrard defeated Thomas Scoffin in the final with a score of 8–4, while Fujisawa defeated Kim Eun-jung in the women's final with a score of 5–2.

== Men ==
=== Teams ===
The teams are listed as follows:

Skip	Third	Second	Lead	Locale
Tom Appelman	Brent Bawel	Ted Appelman	Brendan Melnyk	Edmonton, Alberta
Adam Gagné (fourth)	Doug Brewer (skip)	Trevor Brewer	Chris Gannon	Brockville, Ontario
Warren Cross	Dean Darwent	Jim Wallbank	Chad Jones	Edmonton, Alberta
Shawn Donnelly	Kendall Warawa	Curtis Der	Neal Woloschuk	Edmonton, Alberta
Jeremy Harty	Cole Parsons	Joel Berger	Daniel LaCoste	Nanton, Alberta
Greg Keith	Wilson Nelson	Curtis Daniels	Martin Pederson	Spruce Grove, Alberta
Kim Chang-min	Kim Min-chan	Seong Se-hyeon	Seon Se-young	Uiseong, Gyeongbuk, South Korea
Rick McKague	Jim Moats	Doug McNish	Paul Strandlund	Edmonton, Alberta
Jon Rennie	Jeff Inglis	Rob Collins	Eric Wasylenko	Calgary, Alberta
Robert Schlender	Dean Ross	Don Bartlett	Chris Lemishka	Edmonton, Alberta
Thomas Scoffin	Dylan Gousseau	Landon Bucholz	Bryce Bucholz	Edmonton, Alberta
Danny Sherrard	Brandon Klassen	Scott McClements	Todd Kaasten	Edmonton, Alberta
Justin Sluchinski	Aaron Sluchinski	Dylan Webster	Craig Bourgonje	Airdrie, Alberta
Jordan Steinke	Jason Ginter	Tristan Steinke	Brett Winfield	Dawson Creek, British Columbia
Wade Thurber	Harvey Kelts	Rick Hjertaas	Eldon Raab	Red Deer, Alberta
Wade White	Kevin Tym	Dan Holowaychuk	George White	Edmonton, Alberta
Jeremy Hodges (fourth)	Matt Willerton (skip)	Craig MacAlpine	Chris Evernden	Edmonton, Alberta

=== Round-robin standings ===
Final round-robin standings

Key
Teams to Playoffs

Pool A	W	L
(Alberta) Shawn Donnelly	3	1
(Alberta) Rick McKague	3	1
(Alberta) Wade Thurber	3	1
(Alberta) Ted Appelman	1	3
(Alberta) Warren Cross	1	3
(Alberta) Matt Willerton	1	3

Pool B	W	L
(Alberta) Thomas Scoffin	3	1
(Alberta) Danny Sherrard	3	1
(Alberta) Wade White	3	1
(Alberta) Jessi Wilkinson	2	2
(Ontario) Doug Brewer	0	3
(Alberta) Greg Keith	0	3

Pool C	W	L
(South Korea) Kim Chang-min	4	0
(Alberta) Justin Sluchinski	3	1
(Alberta) Jeremy Harty	2	2
(Alberta) Jon Rennie	1	3
(Alberta) Robert Schlender	1	3
(British Columbia) Jordan Steinke	1	3

=== Playoffs ===
Quarterfinals
(South Korea) Kim Chang-min	6
(Alberta) Wade White	5
(Alberta) Thomas Scoffin	4
(Alberta) Justin Sluchinski	3
(Alberta) Danny Sherrard	7
(Alberta) Shawn Donnelly	3
(Alberta) Rick McKague	6
(Alberta) Wade Thurber	2

Semifinals
(South Korea) Kim Chang-min	5
(Alberta) Thomas Scoffin	6
(Alberta) Danny Sherrard	6
(Alberta) Rick McKague	4

Final
(Alberta) Thomas Scoffin	4
(Alberta) Danny Sherrard	8

== Women ==
=== Teams ===
The teams are listed as follows:

Skip	Third	Second	Lead	Locale
Tanilla Doyle	Joelle Horn	Lindsay Amundsen-Meyer	Christina Faulkner	Edmonton, Alberta
Satsuki Fujisawa	Miyo Ichikawa	Emi Shimizu	Miyuki Satoh	Karuizawa, Japan
Tiffany Game	Vanessa Pouliot	Jennifer Van Wieren	Melissa Pierce	Edmonton, Alberta
Brittany Gregor	Lindsay Blyth	Hayley Furst	Tara Tanchak	Calgary, Alberta
Teryn Hamilton	Holly Scott	Logan Conway	Kaylee Moline	Calgary, Alberta
Jiang Yilun	Wang Rui	Yaoi Mingyue	She Quitong	Harbin, China
Lisa Johnson	Michelle Kryzalka	Natalie Holloway	Shawna Nordstrom	Spruce Grove, Alberta
Kim Eun-jung	Kim Gyeong-ae	Kim Seon-yeong	Kim Yeong-mi	Gyeongbuk, South Korea
Lindsay Makichuk	Amy Janko	Jessica Monk	Kristina Hadden	Edmonton, Alberta
Chana Martineau	Pam Appleman	Brittany Zelmer	Jennifer Sheehan	Edmonton, Alberta
Tiffany Odegard	Vanessa Pouliot	Jennifer Van Wieren	Melissa Pierce	Edmonton, Alberta
Kelsey Rocque	Keely Brown	Taylor McDonald	Claire Tully	Edmonton, Alberta
Jennifer Schab	Sheri Pickering	Jody Kiem	Heather Hansen	Calgary, Alberta
Casey Scheidegger	Michele Smith	Jessie Scheidegger	Kimberly Anderson	Lethbridge, Alberta
Iveta Staša-Šaršūne	Ieva Krusta	Zanda Bikše	Dace Munča	Jelgava, Latvia
Tiffany Steuber	Megan Anderson	Lisa Miller	Cindy Westgard	Edmonton, Alberta
Taylore Theroux	Alison Kotylak	Chelsea Duncan	Danielle Schiemann	Edmonton, Alberta
Candace Wanechko	Natalie Hughes	Kara Lindholm	Kandace Lindholm	Edmonton, Alberta
Holly Whyte	Heather Steele	Cori Dunbar	Jamie Forth	Edmonton, Alberta

=== Round-robin standings ===
Final round-robin standings

Key
Teams to Playoffs

Pool A	W	L
(Alberta) Casey Scheidegger	4	0
(Alberta) Tiffany Game	3	1
(Alberta) Tanilla Doyle	2	2
(Alberta) Brittany Gregor	1	3
(Latvia) Iveta Staša-Šaršūne	1	3
(Alberta) Taylore Theroux	1	3

Pool B	W	L
(Japan) Satsuki Fujisawa	4	0
(China) Jiang Yilun	3	1
(Alberta) Jennifer Schab	2	2
(Alberta) Candace Wanechko	2	2
(Alberta) Lisa Johnson	1	3
(Alberta) Teryn Hamilton	0	4

Pool C	W	L
(South Korea) Kim Eun-jung	3	1
(Alberta) Kelsey Rocque	3	1
(Alberta) Holly Whyte	3	1
(Alberta) Lindsay Makichuk	2	2
(Alberta) Chana Martineau	1	3
(Alberta) Tiffany Steuber	0	4

=== Playoffs ===
Quarterfinals
(Japan) Satsuki Fujisawa	7
(Alberta) Jennifer Schab	1
(Alberta) Holly Whyte	5
(Alberta) Kelsey Rocque	3
(Alberta) Casey Scheidegger	9
(China) Jiang Yilun	1
(South Korea) Kim Eun-jung	8
(Alberta) Tiffany Game	0

Semifinals
(Japan) Satsuki Fujisawa	5
(Alberta) Holly Whyte	3
(Alberta) Casey Scheidegger	2
(South Korea) Kim Eun-jung	4

Final
(Japan) Satsuki Fujisawa	5
(South Korea) Kim Eun-jung	2
