= 2012 Spruce Grove Cashspiel =

World Curling Tour event

- Host city: Spruce Grove, Alberta
- Arena: Spruce Grove Curling Club
- Dates: November 23–25
- Men's winner: (Alberta) Les Rogers
- Skip: Les Rogers
- Third: Aaron Bartling
- Second: Jason Hardy
- Lead: Jason McPhee
- Finalist: (Alberta) Greg Keith
- Women's winner: (Alberta) Tiffany Steuber
- Skip: Tiffany Steuber
- Third: Megan Anderson
- Second: Lisa Miller
- Lead: Cindy Westgard
- Finalist: (Alberta) Holly Whyte

The 2012 Spruce Grove Cashspiel was held from November 23 to 25 at the Spruce Grove Curling Club in Spruce Grove, Alberta as part of the 2012–13 World Curling Tour. Both the men's and women's events were held in a round robin format, and the purses for the men's and women's events were CAD$8,000 each, with the winner of each event receiving CAD$2,100. In the men's final, Les Rogers defeated Greg Keith with a score of 6–3 for his first World Curling Tour title. In the women's final, Tiffany Steuber defeated Holly Whyte with a score of 8–7 in an extra end.

== Men ==
=== Teams ===
The teams are listed as follows:

Skip	Third	Second	Lead	Locale
Tom Appelman	Ted Appelman	Ted Appelman, Sr.	Dave Douglas	Edmonton, Alberta
Randy Detillieux	Kelly Hobbs	Dale Resnak	Dave Zesko	Spruce Grove, Alberta
Shawn Donnelly	Kendall Warawa	Curtis Der	Neal Woloschuk	Edmonton, Alberta
Tony Germsheid	Randy Guidinger	Conrad Yaremchuk		Edmonton, Alberta
Richard Guidinger	Dale Fellows	Lyle Biever	Jeff Smith	Edmonton, Alberta
Glen Hanson	Les Steuber	Brian Romanyshyn	Brent Fellows	Edmonton, Alberta
Curtis Harrish	Brian Kushinski	Tyler Wasieckzo	Dan Munro	Edmonton, Alberta
Don DeLair (fourth)	Greg Hill (skip)	Chris Blackwell	Stephen Jensen	Airdrie, Alberta
Greg Keith	Wilson Nelson	Curtis Daniels	Martin Pederson	Spruce Grove, Alberta
Jon Rennie	Jeff Inglis	Rob Collins	Eric Wasylenko	Calgary, Alberta
Kyle Richard	Matt Yeo	Neil Bratrud	Colin Huber	Gibbons, Alberta
Les Rogers	Aaron Bartling	Jason Hardy	Jason McPhee	Edmonton, Alberta
Robert Schlender	Dean Ross	Don Bartlett	Chris Lemishka	Edmonton, Alberta
Wade White	Kevin Tym	Dan Holowaychuk	George White	Edmonton, Alberta
Benny Wilkinson				Whitecourt, Alberta
Jessi Wilkinson	Tyler Pfeiffer	Morgan Vandoesburg	Wade Hagman	Edmonton, Alberta

=== Round-robin standings ===
Final round-robin standings

Key
Teams to Playoffs

Pool A	W	L
(Alberta) Wade White	3	0
(Alberta) Greg Keith	2	1
(Alberta) Jon Rennie	1	2
(Alberta) Randy Detillieux	0	3

Pool B	W	L
(Alberta) Shawn Donnelly	2	1
(Alberta) Robert Schlender	2	1
(Alberta) Tony Germsheid	1	2
(Alberta) Benny Wilkinson	1	2

Pool C	W	L
(Alberta) Tom Appelman	2	0
(Alberta) Kyle Richard	2	0
(Alberta) Jessi Wilkinson	1	2
(Alberta) Richard Guidinger	0	3

Pool D	W	L
(Alberta) Les Rogers	2	1
(Alberta) Curtis Harrish	2	1
(Alberta) Glen Hanson	1	2
(Alberta) Greg Hill	1	2

=== Playoffs ===
The playoffs draw is listed as follows:

Quarterfinals
(Alberta) Wade White	4
(Alberta) Les Rogers	5
(Alberta) Shawn Donnelly	7
(Alberta) Tom Appelman	3
(Alberta) Kyle Richard	4
(Alberta) Robert Schlender	6
(Alberta) Curtis Harrish	5
(Alberta) Greg Keith	6

Semifinals
(Alberta) Les Rogers	5
(Alberta) Shawn Donnelly	4
(Alberta) Robert Schlender	6
(Alberta) Greg Keith	7

Final
(Alberta) Les Rogers	6
(Alberta) Greg Keith	3

== Women ==
=== Teams ===
The teams are listed as follows:

Skip	Third	Second	Lead	Locale
Lisa Eyamie	Maria Bushell	Jodi Marthaller	Valerie Hamende	High River, Alberta
Tiffany Game	Vanessa Pouliot	Jennifer Van Wieren	Melissa Pierce	Edmonton, Alberta
Brittany Gregor	Lindsay Blyth	Hayley Furst	Tara Tanchak	Calgary, Alberta
Teryn Hamilton	Holly Scott	Logan Conway	Karen Vanthuyne	Calgary, Alberta
Heather Jensen	Shana Snell	Heather Rogers	Carly Quigley	Airdrie, Alberta
Lisa Johnson	Michelle Kryzalka	Natalie Holloway	Shawna Nordstrom	Spruce Grove, Alberta
Cathy King	Carolyn Morris	Lesley McEwen	Doreen Gares	Edmonton, Alberta
Lindsay Makichuk	Amy Janko	Jessica Monk	Kristina Hadden	Edmonton, Alberta
Chana Martineau	Pam Appleman	Brittany Zelmer	Jennifer Sheehan	Edmonton, Alberta
Morgan Muise	Lyndsay Allen	Sarah Horne	Sara Gartner-Frey	Calgary, Alberta
Casey Scheidegger	Michele Smith	Jessie Scheidegger	Kimberly Anderson	Lethbridge, Alberta
Tiffany Steuber	Megan Anderson	Lisa Miller	Cindy Westgard	Edmonton, Alberta
Valerie Sweeting	Dana Ferguson	Joanne Taylor	Rachelle Pidherny	Edmonton, Alberta
Candace Wanechko	Natalie Hughes	Kara Lindholm	Kandace Lindholm	Edmonton, Alberta
Brittany Whittemore	Julia Gavin	Jessica Henricks	Alana Pinkoski	Edmonton, Alberta
Holly Whyte	Heather Steele	Cori Dunbar	Jamie Forth	Edmonton, Alberta

=== Round-robin standings ===
Final round-robin standings

Key
Teams to Playoffs

Pool A	W	L
(Alberta) Lindsay Makichuk	2	1
(Alberta) Teryn Hamilton	2	1
(Alberta) Casey Scheidegger	2	1
(Alberta) Candace Wanechko	0	3

Pool B	W	L
(Alberta) Heather Jensen	2	1
(Alberta) Chana Martineau	2	1
(Alberta) Lisa Eyamie	1	2
(Alberta) Morgan Muise	1	2

Pool C	W	L
(Alberta) Valerie Sweeting	3	0
(Alberta) Lisa Johnson	2	1
(Alberta) Cathy King	1	2
(Alberta) Brittany Whittemore	0	3

Pool D	W	L
(Alberta) Tiffany Steuber	3	0
(Alberta) Holly Whyte	2	1
(Alberta) Tiffany Game	1	2
(Alberta) Brittany Gregor	0	3

=== Playoffs ===
The playoffs draw is listed as follows:

Quarterfinals
(Alberta) Teryn Hamilton	3
(Alberta) Holly Whyte	5
(Alberta) Heather Jensen	5
(Alberta) Lisa Johnson	6
(Alberta) Valerie Sweeting	3
(Alberta) Chana Martineau	5
(Alberta) Tiffany Steuber	5
(Alberta) Lindsay Makichuk	3

Semifinals
(Alberta) Holly Whyte	6
(Alberta) Lisa Johnson	3
(Alberta) Chana Martineau	1
(Alberta) Tiffany Steuber	5

Final
(Alberta) Holly Whyte	7
(Alberta) Tiffany Steuber	8
