= 2012 Atkins Curling Supplies Women's Classic =

- Host city: Winnipeg, Manitoba
- Arena: East St. Paul Curling Club
- Dates: October 12–15
- Winner: (Manitoba) Kate Cameron
- Curling club: Stonewall CC, Stonewall
- Skip: Kate Cameron
- Third: Erika Sigurdson
- Second: Brandi Oliver
- Lead: Lindsay Baldock
- Finalist: (Manitoba) Kerri Einarson

The 2012 Atkins Curling Supplies Women's Classic was held from October 12 to 15 at the East St. Paul Curling Club in Winnipeg, Manitoba as part of the 2012–13 World Curling Tour. The event was held in a round robin format, and the purse for the event was CAD$15,000.

== Teams ==
The teams are listed as follows:

Skip	Third	Second	Lead	Locale
Meghan Armit	Nikki Hawrylyshen	Sarah Lund	Nadine Cabak-Ralph	Winnipeg, Manitoba
Shannon Birchard	Nicole Sigvaldason	Sheyna Andries	Mondor Mariah	Winnipeg, Manitoba
Joelle Brown	Susan Baleja	Kyla Denisuik	Jennifer Cawson	Winnipeg, Manitoba
Kate Cameron	Erika Sigurdson	Brandi Oliver	Lindsay Baldock	Stonewall, Manitoba
Lisa DeRiviere	Karen Klein	Jolene Rutter	Theresa Cannon	Winnipeg, Manitoba
Kerri Einarson	Sara Van Walleghem	Liz Fyfe	Krysten Karwacki	Winnipeg, Manitoba
Karen Fallis	Sam Murata	Jennifer Clark-Rouire	Jillian Sandison	Winnipeg, Manitoba
Stacey Fordyce	Kelsey Russill	Janelle Vachon	Roslynn Ripley	Brandon, Manitoba
Janet Harvey	Cherri-Ann Loder	Kristin Loder	Carey Kirby	Winnipeg, Manitoba
Selena Kaatz	Briane Meilleur	Kristin MacCuish	Katherine Doerksen	Winnipeg, Manitoba
Colleen Kilgallen	Janice Blair	Lesle Cafferty	Leslie Wilson	Pinawa, Manitoba
Jackie Komyshyn	Riki Komyshyn	Stacey Olson	Kelsey Hinds	Winnipeg, Manitoba
Tina Kozak	Erin Mahoney	Betty Buurma	Suzie Scott	Carberry, Manitoba
Kim Link	Maureen Bonar	Angela Wickman	Renee Fletcher	East St. Paul, Manitoba
Deb McCreanor	Ashley Meakin	Heather Carsen	Laurie MacDonnell	La Salle, Manitoba
Ekaterina Antonova (fourth)	Victorya Moiseeva (skip)	Galina Arsenkina	Aleksandra Saitova	Moscow, Russia
Michelle Montford	Courtney Blanchard	D'Arcy Maywood	Sarah Neufeld	Winnipeg, Manitoba
Darcy Robertson	Tracey Lavery	Venessa Foster	Michelle Kruk	Winnipeg, Manitoba
Karen Rosser	Cheryl Reed	Amanda Tycholis	Andrea Tirschmann	Springfield, Manitoba
Barb Spencer	Katie Spencer	Ainsley Champagne	Raunora Westcott	Winnipeg, Manitoba
Jill Thurston	Kristen Phillips	Brette Richards	Kendra Georges	Winnipeg, Manitoba
Terry Ursel	Wanda Rainka	Kendell Kohinski	Lisa Davie	Plumas, Manitoba
Alyssa Vandepoele	Heather Maxted	Katelyn Williams	Ashley Jahns	Winnipeg, Manitoba
Amy Wright	Courtney George	Aileen Sormunen	Amanda McLean	Duluth, Minnesota

== Round-robin standings ==
Final round-robin standings

Key
Teams to Playoffs
Teams to Tiebreaker

Pool A	W	L
(Manitoba) Barb Spencer	5	0
(Manitoba) Kerri Einarson	4	1
(Manitoba) Tina Kozak	3	2
(Manitoba) Meghan Armit	1	4
(Manitoba) Terry Ursel	1	4
(Minnesota) Amy Wright	1	4

Pool B	W	L
(Manitoba) Janet Harvey	4	1
(Manitoba) Kate Cameron	3	2
(Manitoba) Jill Thurston	3	2
(Manitoba) Kim Link	2	3
(Manitoba) Alyssa Vandepoele	2	3
(Manitoba) Debbie McCreanor	1	4

Pool C	W	L
(Manitoba) Darcy Robertson	5	0
(Manitoba) Shannon Birchard	3	2
(Manitoba) Joelle Brown	2	3
(Manitoba) Jackie Komyshyn	2	3
(Manitoba) Karen Rosser	2	3
(Manitoba) Stacey Fordyce	1	4

Pool D	W	L
(Manitoba) Lisa DeRiviere	4	1
(Manitoba) Karen Fallis	4	1
(Manitoba) Selena Kaatz	3	2
(Russia) Victorya Moiseeva	2	3
(Manitoba) Michelle Montford	2	3
(Manitoba) Colleen Kilgallen	0	5

== Tiebreaker ==
Team	Final
(Manitoba) Kate Cameron	5
(Manitoba) Jill Thurston	4

== Playoffs ==
Quarterfinals
(Manitoba) Darcy Robertson	4
(Manitoba) Kate Cameron	5
(Manitoba) Janet Harvey	3
(Manitoba) Karen Fallis	6
(Manitoba) Lisa DeRiviere	5
(Manitoba) Kerri Einarson	8
(Manitoba) Barb Spencer	6
(Manitoba) Shannon Birchard	5

Semifinals
(Manitoba) Kate Cameron	8
(Manitoba) Karen Fallis	3
(Manitoba) Kerri Einarson	5
(Manitoba) Barb Spencer	4

Final
(Manitoba) Kate Cameron	7
(Manitoba) Kerri Einarson	2
