= Madison Cash Spiel =

Former World Curling Tour event

The Madison Cash Spiel (formerly the Laphroaig Curling Championship, the Laphroaig Scotch Open, The Korbel Championship and the Morgan Stanley Curling Classic) was an annual bonspiel, or curling tournament, that took place at the Madison Curling Club in Madison, Wisconsin. The tournament was held in a round-robin format. The men's tournament, started in 2003 as part of the World Curling Tour, was held every year since its inception until 2013. The women's tournament began in 2011. The tournament was part of the Great Lakes Curling Tour.

== Past champions ==
Only skip's name is displayed.

=== Men ===
Year	Winning team	Runner up team	Purse (USD)
2003	(Wisconsin) Craig Brown		
2004	(Minnesota) Pete Fenson		
2005	(Minnesota) Pete Fenson		
2006	(Wisconsin) Craig Brown		
2007	(Wisconsin) Craig Brown	(Ontario) Trevor Bonot	
2008	(Washington (state)) Greg Romaniuk	(Minnesota) Pete Fenson	$16,000
2009	(Wisconsin) Kroy Nernberger	(Minnesota) Pete Fenson	$16,000
2010	(Minnesota) Todd Birr	(Wisconsin) Matt Hamilton	$14,100
2011	(Minnesota) Pete Fenson	(Wisconsin) David Brown	
2012	(Minnesota) Pete Fenson	(Minnesota) John Shuster	$10,800
2013	(Minnesota) Todd Birr	(Minnesota) Mike Farbelow	$10,800

=== Women ===
Year	Winning team	Runner up team	Purse (USD)
2011	(Wisconsin) Erika Brown	(New York (state)) Patti Lank	
2012	(Wisconsin) Erika Brown	(Ontario) Jill Mouzar	$12,000
