= 2012 Vic Open =

World Curling Tour event

- Host city: Quebec City, Quebec
- Arena: Club de curling Victoria
- Dates: December 13–16
- Winner: (Quebec) Simon Dupuis
- Skip: Simon Dupuis
- Third: Louis Biron
- Second: Frederic Boulanger
- Lead: Maurice Cayouette
- Finalist: (Quebec) Philippe Lemay

The 2012 Vic Open was held from December 13 to 16 at the Club de curling Victoria in Quebec City, Quebec as part of the 2012–13 World Curling Tour. The event was held in a round robin format, and the purse for the event was CAD$10,000, of which the winner, Simon Dupuis, received CAD$1,800. Dupuis defeated Philippe Lemay in the final with a score of 8–6.

== Teams ==
The teams are listed as follows.

Though the event is listed on the men's World Curling Tour, one women's team, skipped by Marie-France Larouche, was allowed to participate.

Skip	Third	Second	Lead	Locale
Alexandre Bergeron-Gallant	Olivier Larouche	William Lebel	Marcel Tremblay	Quebec City, Quebec
Pascal Chouinard	Pierre Lajoie	Mathieu Gagnon	Thierry Fournier	Quebec City, Quebec
Robert Desjardins	Jean-Sébastien Roy	Steven Munroe	Steeve Villeneuve	Chicoutimi, Quebec
Simon Dupuis	Louis Biron	Frederic Boulanger	Maurice Cayouette	Buckingham, Quebec
Dan Elie	Daniel Caron	Paul Lodge	Dany Beaulieu	Otterburn Park, Quebec
Martin Ferland	François Roberge	Shawn Fowler	Maxime Elmaleh	Quebec City, Quebec
Michael Fournier	Francois Gionest	Yannick Martel	Jean-François Charest	Montreal, Quebec
Steeve Gagnon	Martin Roy	Mike Coolidge	Olivier Beaulieu	Rosemère, Quebec
Pierre Gervais	Guy Turner	Allain Maillette	Eric Lemaire	Trois-Rivières, Quebec
Guy Hemmings	François Gagné	Ghyslain Richard	Christian Bouchard	Montreal, Quebec
Denis Laflamme	Bernard Gingras	Claude Gagnon	Alain Lapierre	Sept-Îles, Quebec
Marie-France Larouche	Brenda Nicholls	Véronique Grégoire	Amélie Blais	Lévis, Quebec
Simon Lejour	Yannick Lejour	Mathieu Lambert	Claude Chapdeelaine	Lacolle, Quebec
Philippe Lemay	Mathieu Beaufort	Jean-Michel Arsenault	Érik Lachance	Trois-Rivières, Quebec
Nicolas Marceau	Jasmin Gibeau	Vincent Bourget	Michael Fortin	Quebec City, Quebec
Pierre-Luc Morissette	David Godin	Andre Desgagnes	Stephane Roy	Quebec City, Quebec

== Round robin standings ==
Final Round Robin Standings

Key
Teams to Playoffs

Pool A	W	L
(Quebec) Martin Ferland	3	0
(Quebec) Marie-France Larouche	2	1
(Quebec) Pierre Gervais	1	2
(Quebec) Alexandre Bergeron-Gallant	0	3

Pool B	W	L
(Quebec) Robert Desjardins	2	1
(Quebec) Simon Dupuis	2	1
(Quebec) Denis Laflamme	2	1
(Quebec) Pierre-Luc Morissette	0	3

Pool C	W	L
(Quebec) Philippe Lemay	3	0
(Quebec) Steeve Gagnon	2	1
(Quebec) Pascal Chouinard	1	2
(Quebec) Nicolas Marceau	0	3

Pool D	W	L
(Quebec) Michael Fournier	3	0
(Quebec) Dan Élie	2	1
(Quebec) Guy Hemmings	1	2
(Quebec) Simon Lejour	0	3

== Tiebreaker ==
Team	Final
(Quebec) Dan Élie	2
(Quebec) Marie-France Larouche	4

== Playoffs ==
The playoffs draw is listed as follows:

Quarterfinals
(Quebec) Martin Ferland	5
(Quebec) Marie-France Larouche	6
(Quebec) Simon Dupuis	6
(Quebec) Steeve Gagnon	3
(Quebec) Michael Fournier	6
(Quebec) Robert Desjardins	4
(Quebec) Philippe Lemay	6
(Quebec) Denis Laflamme	1

Semifinals
(Quebec) Marie-France Larouche	1
(Quebec) Simon Dupuis	2
(Quebec) Michael Fournier	7
(Quebec) Philippe Lemay	8

Final
(Quebec) Simon Dupuis	8
(Quebec) Philippe Lemay	6
