= Bernick's Miller Lite Open =

Curling tournament

The Bernick's Miller Lite Open was an annual bonspiel, or curling tournament, that took place at the Bemidji Curling Club in Bemidji, Minnesota. The tournament was held in a round robin format. The tournament was started in 2012 as part of the World Curling Tour and lasted for four seasons.

== Past champions ==
Only skip's name is displayed.

Year	Winning team	Runner up team	Purse (USD)
2012	(Ontario) Al Hackner	(Minnesota) Pete Fenson	$18,000
2013	(Ontario) Jeff Currie	(Minnesota) John Shuster	$14,000
2014	(Minnesota) Korey Dropkin	(Ontario) Al Hackner	$14,000
2015	(Manitoba) Matt Dunstone	(Minnesota) Pete Fenson	$14,000
