= 2012 Challenge Casino de Charlevoix =

- Host city: Clermont, Quebec
- Arena: Aréna de Clermont; Club de curling Nairn
- Dates: November 22–25
- Winner: (Switzerland) Peter de Cruz
- Skip: Peter de Cruz
- Fourth: Benoît Schwarz
- Second: Dominik Märki
- Lead: Valentin Tanner
- Finalist: (Ontario) Brad Jacobs

The 2012 Challenge Casino de Charlevoix was held from November 22 to 25 at the Aréna de Clermont and the Club de curling Nairn in Clermont, Quebec as part of the 2012–13 World Curling Tour. The event is being held in a triple knockout format, and the purse for the event is CAD$37,000, of which the winner will receive CAD$12,000. In the final, Peter de Cruz of Switzerland defeated Brad Jacobs of Ontario in an extra end with a score of 6–5.

== Teams ==
The teams are listed as follows:

Skip	Third	Second	Lead	Locale
Mark Dacey	Tom Sullivan	Steve Burgess	Andrew Gibson	Halifax, Nova Scotia
Benoît Schwarz (fourth)	Peter de Cruz (skip)	Dominik Märki	Valentin Tanner	Geneva, Switzerland
Robert Desjardins	Jean-Sébastien Roy	Steven Munroe	Steeve Villeneuve	Chicoutimi, Quebec
Niklas Edin	Sebastian Kraupp	Fredrik Lindberg	Viktor Kjäll	Karlstad, Sweden
Martin Ferland	François Roberge	Shawn Fowler	Maxime Elmaleh	Quebec City, Quebec
Ian Fitzner-Leblanc (fourth)	Paul Flemming (skip)	Graham Breckon	Kelly Middelstadt	Halifax, Nova Scotia
Pierre Gervais	Guy Turner	Alain Maillette	Éric Lemaire	Trois-Rivières, Quebec
Pascal Hess	Yves Hess	Florian Meister	Stefan Meienberg	Switzerland
Brad Jacobs	Ryan Fry	E. J. Harnden	Ryan Harnden	Sault Ste. Marie, Ontario
Steve Laycock	Kirk Muyres	Colton Flasch	Dallan Muyres	Saskatoon, Saskatchewan
Philippe Lemay	Mathieu Beaufort	Jean-Michel Arsenault	Érik Lachance	Trois-Rivières, Quebec
Mike Kennedy (fourth)	Marc Lecocq (skip)	Jamie Brannen	Dave Konefal	Nackawic, New Brunswick
Doug MacKenzie (fourth)	Chad Stevens (skip)	Scott Saccary	Philip Crowell	Halifax, Nova Scotia
Eddie MacKenzie	Anson Carmody	Christian Tolusso	Alex MacFayden	Charlottetown, Prince Edward Island
Jean-Michel Ménard	Martin Crête	Éric Sylvain	Philippe Ménard	Quebec City, Quebec
Sven Michel	Claudio Pätz	Sandro Trolliet	Simon Gempeler	Adelboden, Switzerland
Howard Rajala	J. P. Lachance	Chris Fulton	Paul Madden	Ottawa, Ontario
Serge Reid	François Gionest	Yannick Martel	Jean-François Charest	Saguenay, Quebec
Doug MacKenzie (fourth)	Chad Stevens (skip)	Scott Saccary	Philip Crowell	Halifax, Nova Scotia

== Knockout results ==
The draw is listed as follows:

=== A event ===
First Knockout
(Nova Scotia) Paul Flemming	6
(Nova Scotia) Chad Stevens	4

Quarterfinals
(Sweden) Niklas Edin	5
(Nova Scotia) Paul Flemming	3
(Quebec) Martin Ferland	8
(Switzerland) Pascal Hess	4
(Quebec) Jean-Michel Ménard	5
(Ontario) Howard Rajala	2
(Switzerland) Peter de Cruz	9
(New Brunswick) Marc Lecocq	7

Semifinals
(Sweden) Niklas Edin	4
(Quebec) Martin Ferland	8
(Quebec) Jean-Michel Ménard	8
(Switzerland) Peter de Cruz	3

Qualifier 1
(Quebec) Martin Ferland	5
(Quebec) Jean-Michel Ménard	4

First Knockout
(Nova Scotia) Mark Dacey	6
(Quebec) Serge Reid	5
(Quebec) Guy Hemmings	6
(Quebec) Pierre Gervais	3

Quarterfinals
(Ontario) Brad Jacobs	6
(Nova Scotia) Mark Dacey	4
(Saskatchewan) Steve Laycock	7
(Prince Edward Island) Eddie McKenzie	4
(Switzerland) Sven Michel	4
(Quebec) Guy Hemmings	2
(Quebec) Robert Desjardins	7
(Quebec) Philippe Lemay	5

Semifinals
(Ontario) Brad Jacobs	1
(Saskatchewan) Steve Laycock	6
(Switzerland) Sven Michel	6
(Quebec) Robert Desjardins	5

Qualifier 2
(Saskatchewan) Steve Laycock	7
(Switzerland) Sven Michel	4

=== B event ===
Second Knockout
(Nova Scotia) Chad Stevens	3
(Switzerland) Pascal Hess	5

Quarterfinals
(Switzerland) Pascal Hess	7
(Ontario) Howard Rajala	6
(New Brunswick) Marc Lecocq	10
(Nova Scotia) Paul Flemming	4

Semifinals
(Switzerland) Pascal Hess	7
(New Brunswick) Marc Lecocq	3

Qualifier 3
(Switzerland) Sven Michel	3
(Switzerland) Pascal Hess	7

Second Knockout
(Quebec) Serge Reid	8
(Prince Edward Island) Eddie McKenzie	4
(Quebec) Pierre Gervais	4
(Quebec) Philippe Lemay	8

Quarterfinals
(Quebec) Serge Reid	6
(Quebec) Guy Hemmings	5
(Quebec) Philippe Lemay	3
(Nova Scotia) Mark Dacey	7

Semifinals
(Quebec) Serge Reid	6
(Nova Scotia) Mark Dacey	9

Qualifier 4
(Quebec) Jean-Michel Ménard	6
(Nova Scotia) Mark Dacey	8

Second Knockout		Qualifier 5
(Sweden) Niklas Edin	8
(Switzerland) Peter de Cruz	4	(Sweden) Niklas Edin	4
(Ontario) Brad Jacobs	6	(Ontario) Brad Jacobs	5
(Quebec) Robert Desjardins	5

=== C event ===
Third Knockout		Semifinals		Qualifier 6
(Ontario) Howard Rajala	5
(Nova Scotia) Paul Flemming	8	(Nova Scotia) Paul Flemming	8
		(Quebec) Robert Desjardins	4
				(Nova Scotia) Paul Flemming	4
				(Quebec) Jean-Michel Ménard	6

Third Knockout		Semifinals		Qualifier 7
(Quebec) Guy Hemmings	3
(Quebec) Philippe Lemay	8	(Quebec) Philippe Lemay	0
		(Switzerland) Peter de Cruz	6
				(Switzerland) Peter de Cruz	6
				(Switzerland) Sven Michel	3

Third Knockout
(Prince Edward Island) Eddie McKenzie	7
(Quebec) Pierre Gervais	3

Quarterfinals
(Quebec) Serge Reid	6
(Nova Scotia) Chad Stevens	7
(New Brunswick) Marc Lecocq	5
(Prince Edward Island) Eddie McKenzie	4

Semifinals
(Nova Scotia) Chad Stevens	4
(New Brunswick) Marc Lecocq	8

Qualifier 8
(New Brunswick) Marc Lecocq	3
(Sweden) Niklas Edin	8

== Playoffs ==
The playoffs draw is listed as follows:

Quarterfinals
(Sweden) Niklas Edin	8
(Quebec) Martin Ferland	3
(Ontario) Brad Jacobs	6
(Nova Scotia) Mark Dacey	0
(Switzerland) Peter de Cruz	6
(Saskatchewan) Steve Laycock	2
(Quebec) Jean-Michel Ménard	7
(Switzerland) Pascal Hess	3

Semifinals
(Sweden) Niklas Edin	2
(Ontario) Brad Jacobs	6
(Switzerland) Peter de Cruz	7
(Quebec) Jean-Michel Ménard	3

Final
(Ontario) Brad Jacobs	5
(Switzerland) Peter de Cruz	6
