= 2012 DEKALB Superspiel =

- Host city: Morris, Manitoba
- Arena: Morris Curling Club
- Dates: November 22–25
- Men's winner: (Manitoba) William Lyburn
- Skip: William Lyburn
- Third: James Kirkness
- Second: Alex Forrest
- Lead: Tyler Forrest
- Finalist: (Switzerland) Alexander Attinger
- Women's winner: (Manitoba) Darcy Robertson
- Skip: Darcy Robertson
- Third: Tracey Lavery
- Second: Venessa Foster
- Lead: Michelle Kruk
- Finalist: (Manitoba) Barb Spencer

The 2012 DEKALB Superspiel was held from November 22 to 25 at the Morris Curling Club in Morris, Manitoba as part of the 2012–13 World Curling Tour. The event was held in a triple knockout format. The purse for the men's event was CAD$30,000, of which the winner, William Lyburn, received CAD$10,000, while the purse for the women's event was CAD$24,000, of which the winner, Darcy Robertson, received CAD$8,000. In the men's final, Lyburn defeated Alexander Attinger of Switzerland with a score of 8–1 in four ends, while in the women's final, Robertson defeated her sister, defending champion Barb Spencer, with a score of 6–4 in an extra end.

== Men ==
=== Teams ===
The teams are listed as follows:

Skip	Third	Second	Lead	Locale
Alexander Attinger	Felix Attinger	Daniel Schifferli	Simon Attinger	Switzerland
Daniel Birchard	Kelly Fordyce	Brody Moore	Andrew Peck	Winnipeg, Manitoba
Scott Bitz	Jeff Sharp	Aryn Schmidt	Dean Hicke	Regina, Saskatchewan
Dave Boehmer	William Kuran	Shawn Magnusson		Petersfield, Manitoba
Dennis Bohn				Winnipeg, Manitoba
Kyle Doering	Connor Njegovan	Derek Oryniak	Kyle Kurz	Winnipeg, Manitoba
Randy Dutiaume	Peter Nicholls	Dean Moxham	Greg Melnichuk	Winnipeg, Manitoba
Dave Elias	Kevin Thompson	Hubert Perrin	Chris Suchy	Winnipeg, Manitoba
Kyle Foster	Wes Jonasson	Rodney Legault	Darcy Jacobs	Arborg, Manitoba
Sean Grassie	Corey Chambers	Kody Janzen	Stuart Shiells	Winnipeg, Manitoba
William Lyburn	James Kirkness	Alex Forrest	Tyler Forrest	Winnipeg, Manitoba
Daley Peters	Chris Galbraith	Kyle Einarson	Mike Neufeld	Winnipeg, Manitoba
Dan Petryk (fourth)	Steve Petryk (skip)	Roland Robinson	Thomas Usselman	Calgary, Alberta
Scott Ramsay	Mark Taylor	Ross McFayden	Kyle Werenich	Winnipeg, Manitoba
Robert Rumfeldt	Adam Spencer	Scott Hodgson	Greg Robinson	Guelph, Ontario
Greg Todoruk				Dauphin, Manitoba

=== Knockout results ===
The draw is listed as follows:

==== A event ====
First Knockout		Semifinals		Qualifier 1
(Manitoba) Robert Rumfeldt	2
(Manitoba) Dennis Bohn	7	(Manitoba) Dennis Bohn	9
(Manitoba) Scott Ramsay	6	(Manitoba) Randy Dutiaume	4
(Manitoba) Randy Dutiaume	7			(Manitoba) Dennis Bohn	6
(Manitoba) Sean Grassie	5			(Saskatchewan) Scott Bitz	2
(Manitoba) Kyle Doering	6	(Manitoba) Kyle Doering	4
(Manitoba) Dave Boehmer	1	(Saskatchewan) Scott Bitz	5
(Saskatchewan) Scott Bitz	5

First Knockout		Semifinals		Qualifier 2
(Alberta) Steve Petryk	4
(Manitoba) Daniel Birchard	6	(Manitoba) Daniel Birchard	5
(Manitoba) Greg Todoruk	9	(Manitoba) Greg Todoruk	6
(Switzerland) Alexander Attinger	3			(Manitoba) Greg Todoruk	5
(Manitoba) Daley Peters	6			(Manitoba) Daley Peters	8
(Manitoba) Kyle Foster	1	(Manitoba) Daley Peters	4
(Manitoba) Dave Elias	5	(Manitoba) William Lyburn	3
(Manitoba) William Lyburn	7

==== B event ====
Second Knockout		Semifinals		Qualifier 3
(Manitoba) Robert Rumfeldt	4
(Manitoba) Scott Ramsay	5	(Manitoba) Scott Ramsay	2
(Manitoba) Sean Grassie	4	(Manitoba) Sean Grassie	7
(Manitoba) Dave Boehmer	3			(Manitoba) Sean Grassie	5
				(Manitoba) Greg Todoruk	2

Second Knockout		Semifinals		Qualifier 4
(Alberta) Steve Petryk	4
(Switzerland) Alexander Attinger	1	(Alberta) Steve Petryk	4
(Manitoba) Kyle Foster	4	(Manitoba) Dave Elias	5
(Manitoba) Dave Elias	10			(Manitoba) Dave Elias	7
				(Saskatchewan) Scott Bitz	5

Second Knockout		Qualifier 5
(Manitoba) Randy Dutiaume	4
(Manitoba) Kyle Doering	5	(Manitoba) Kyle Doering	3
(Manitoba) Daniel Birchard	4	(Manitoba) William Lyburn	8
(Manitoba) William Lyburn	7

==== C event ====
Third Knockout		Semifinals		Qualifier 6
(Manitoba) Robert Rumfeldt	6
(Manitoba) Dave Boehmer	1	(Manitoba) Robert Rumfeldt	2
		(Manitoba) Daniel Birchard	5
				(Manitoba) Daniel Birchard	6
				(Saskatchewan) Scott Bitz	8

Third Knockout		Semifinals		Qualifier 7
(Switzerland) Alexander Attinger	8
(Manitoba) Kyle Foster	7	(Switzerland) Alexander Attinger	6
		(Manitoba) Randy Dutiaume	5
				(Switzerland) Alexander Attinger	4
				(Manitoba) Greg Todoruk	3

Third Knockout		Qualifier 8
(Manitoba) Scott Ramsay	6
(Alberta) Steve Petryk	4	(Manitoba) Scott Ramsay	3
		(Manitoba) Kyle Doering	7

=== Playoffs ===
The playoffs draw is listed as follows:

Quarterfinals
(Manitoba) Dennis Bohn	4
(Switzerland) Alexander Attinger	6
(Manitoba) Sean Grassie	7
(Manitoba) Kyle Doering	1
(Manitoba) Daley Peters	6
(Saskatchewan) Scott Bitz	4
(Manitoba) Dave Elias	1
(Manitoba) William Lyburn	6

Semifinals
(Switzerland) Alexander Attinger	5
(Manitoba) Sean Grassie	4
(Manitoba) Daley Peters	2
(Manitoba) William Lyburn	7

Final
(Switzerland) Alexander Attinger	1
(Manitoba) William Lyburn	8

== Women ==
=== Teams ===
The teams are listed as follows:

Skip	Third	Second	Lead	Locale
Joelle Brown	Susan Baleja	Kyla Denisuik	Jennifer Cawson	Winnipeg, Manitoba
Katie Cameron	Erika Sigurdson	Brandi Oliver	Lindsay Baldock	Stonewall, Manitoba
Candace Chisholm	Cindy Ricci	Natalie Bloomfield	Kristy Johnson	Regina, Saskatchewan
Lisa DeRiviere	Karen Klein	Jolene Rutter	Theresa Cannon	Winnipeg, Manitoba
Deanna Doig	Kim Schneider	Colleen Ackerman	Michelle McIvor	Kronau, Saskatchewan
Karen Fallis	Sam Murata	Jennifer Clark-Rouire	Jillian Sandison	Winnipeg, Manitoba
Janet Harvey	Cherri-Ann Loder	Kristin Loder	Carey Kirby	Winnipeg, Manitoba
Sherry Just	Alyssa Despins	Sharlene Clarke	Jenna Harrison	Saskatoon, Saskatchewan
Colleen Kilgallen	Janice Blair	Lesle Cafferty	Leslie Wilson	Pinawa, Manitoba
Tina Kozak	Erin Mahoney	Betty Buurma	Suzie Scott	Carberry, Manitoba
Deb McCreanor	Ashley Meakin	Heather Carsen	Laurie MacDonnell	La Salle, Manitoba
Michelle Montford	Courtney Blanchard	D'Arcy Maywood	Sarah Neufeld	Winnipeg, Manitoba
Darcy Robertson	Tracey Lavery	Venessa Foster	Michelle Kruk	Winnipeg, Manitoba
Karen Rosser	Cheryl Reed	Amanda Tycholis	Andrea Tirschmann	Springfield, Manitoba
Barb Spencer	Katie Spencer	Ainsley Champagne	Raunora Westcott	Winnipeg, Manitoba
Jill Thurston	Kristen Phillips	Brette Richards	Kendra Georges	Winnipeg, Manitoba

=== Knockout results ===
The teams are listed as follows:

==== A event ====
First Knockout		Semifinals		Qualifier 1
(Manitoba) Karen Fallis	5
(Manitoba) Kate Cameron	8	(Manitoba) Kate Cameron	5
(Manitoba) Colleen Kilgallen	4	(Manitoba) Jill Thurston	3
(Manitoba) Jill Thurston	7			(Manitoba) Kate Cameron	7
(Manitoba) Lisa DeRiviere	2			(Manitoba) Deb McCreanor	2
(Manitoba) Michelle Montford	5	(Manitoba) Michelle Montford	4
(Manitoba) Deb McCreanor	10	(Manitoba) Deb McCreanor	6
(Manitoba) Darcy Robertson	7

First Knockout		Semifinals		Qualifier 2
(Manitoba) Barb Spencer	7
(Manitoba) Karen Rosser	2	(Manitoba) Barb Spencer	9
(Manitoba) Tina Kozak	2	(Saskatchewan) Candace Chisholm	5
(Saskatchewan) Candace Chisholm	6			(Manitoba) Barb Spencer	5
(Saskatchewan) Deanna Doig	4			(Manitoba) Janet Harvey	3
(Manitoba) Joelle Brown	10	(Manitoba) Joelle Brown	3
(Saskatchewan) Sherry Just	4	(Manitoba) Janet Harvey	6
(Manitoba) Janet Harvey	7

==== B event ====
Second Knockout		Semifinals		Qualifier 3
(Manitoba) Karen Fallis	5
(Manitoba) Colleen Kilgallen	6	(Manitoba) Colleen Kilgallen	4
(Manitoba) Lisa DeRiviere	5	(Manitoba) Darcy Robertson	6
(Manitoba) Darcy Robertson	8			(Manitoba) Darcy Robertson	2
				(Manitoba) Janet Harvey	6

Second Knockout		Semifinals		Qualifier 4
(Manitoba) Karen Rosser	0
(Manitoba) Tina Kozak	5	(Manitoba) Tina Kozak	5
(Saskatchewan) Deanna Doig	3	(Saskatchewan) Sherry Just	6
(Saskatchewan) Sherry Just	9			(Saskatchewan) Sherry Just	2
				(Manitoba) Deb McCreanor	10

Second Knockout		Qualifier 5
(Manitoba) Jill Thurston	7
(Manitoba) Michelle Montford	6	(Manitoba) Jill Thurston	5
(Saskatchewan) Candace Chisholm	4	(Manitoba) Joelle Brown	6
(Manitoba) Joelle Brown	9

==== C event ====
Third Knockout		Semifinals		Qualifier 6
(Manitoba) Karen Fallis	1
(Manitoba) Lisa DeRiviere	8	(Manitoba) Lisa DeRiviere	2
		(Saskatchewan) Candace Chisholm	7
				(Saskatchewan) Candace Chisholm	3
				(Saskatchewan) Sherry Just	7

Third Knockout		Semifinals		Qualifier 7
(Manitoba) Karen Rosser	7
(Saskatchewan) Deanna Doig	1	(Manitoba) Karen Rosser	1
		(Manitoba) Michelle Montford	5
				(Manitoba) Michelle Montford	4
				(Manitoba) Darcy Robertson	6

Third Knockout		Qualifier 8`
(Manitoba) Colleen Kilgallen	5
(Manitoba) Tina Kozak	2	(Manitoba) Colleen Kilgallen	6
		(Manitoba) Jill Thurston	5

=== Playoffs ===
The playoffs draw is listed as follows:

Quarterfinals
(Manitoba) Kate Cameron	3
(Manitoba) Darcy Robertson	7
(Manitoba) Janet Harvey	6
(Manitoba) Colleen Kilgallen	3
(Manitoba) Barb Spencer	8
(Saskatchewan) Sherry Just	6
(Manitoba) Deb McCreanor	7
(Manitoba) Joelle Brown	3

Semifinals
(Manitoba) Darcy Robertson	7
(Manitoba) Janet Harvey	6
(Manitoba) Barb Spencer	6
(Manitoba) Deb McCreanor	5

Final
(Manitoba) Darcy Robertson	6
(Manitoba) Barb Spencer	4
