= 2012 Bernick's Miller Lite Open =

- Host city: Bemidji, Minnesota
- Arena: Bemidji Curling Club
- Dates: October 26–28
- Winner: (Ontario) Al Hackner
- Skip: Al Hackner
- Third: Kory Carr
- Second: Kristofer Leupen
- Lead: Gary Champagne
- Finalist: (Minnesota) Pete Fenson

The 2012 Bernick's Miller Lite Open is being held from October 26 to 28 at the Bemidji Curling Club in Bemidji, Minnesota, as part of the 2012–13 World Curling Tour. Though the event is listed as an event on the men's tour, it features one women's team, as it is open to both men and women. The event is being held in a round robin format, and the purse for the event is $18,000. In the final, Al Hackner of Northern Ontario defeated hometown favorite Pete Fenson with a score of 6–4.

== Teams ==
The teams are listed as follows:

Skip	Third	Second	Lead	Locale
Randy Baird		Chase Schmitt	Josh Bahr	Bemidji, Minnesota
Ryan Berg	Al Gulseth	Mark Gulseth	Jordan Brown	West Fargo, North Dakota
Todd Birr	Doug Pottinger	Tom O'Connor	Kevin Birr	Mankato, Minnesota
Andy Borland	Joe Zezel	John Borland	Mark Borland	Hibbing, Minnesota
Scott Brown	Evan Workin	Parker Shook	Spencer Tuskowski	Fargo, North Dakota
Kyle Doering	Connor Njegovan	Derek Oryniak	Kyle Kurz	Winnipeg, Manitoba
Eric Fenson	Trevor Andrews	Blake Morton	Calvin Weber	Bemidji, Minnesota
Pete Fenson	Shawn Rojeski	Joe Polo	Ryan Brunt	Bemidji, Minnesota
Dale Gibbs	William Raymond	James Honsvall	Perry Tholl	St. Paul, Minnesota
Al Hackner	Kory Carr	Kristofer Leupen	Gary Champagne	Thunder Bay, Ontario
Mark Haluptzok	Jon Chandler	Mark Fenner	Alex Fenson	Bemidji, Minnesota
Kevin Kakela				Rolla, North Dakota
Jeff Currie (fourth)	Mike McCarville (skip)	Colin Koivula	Jamie Childs	Thunder Bay, Ontario
Ethan Meyers	Kyle Kakela	Trevor Host	Cameron Ross	Duluth, Minnesota
Kris Perkovich	Aaron Wald	Kevin Johnson	Taylor Skalsky	Chisholm, Minnesota
Allison Pottinger	Nicole Joraanstad	Natalie Nicholson	Tabitha Peterson	St. Paul, Minnesota
John Shuster	Jeff Isaacson	Jared Zezel	John Landsteiner	Duluth, Minnesota
Matt Stevens	Cody Stevens	Robert Liapis	Jeff Breyen	Bemidji, Minnesota

== Round robin standings ==
Final Round Robin Standings

Key
Teams to Playoffs
Teams to Tiebreaker

Pool A	W	L
(Minnesota) Pete Fenson	5	0
(Minnesota) Eric Fenson	4	1
(Minnesota) Mark Haluptzok	2	3
(Minnesota) Ethan Meyers	2	3
(Minnesota) Kris Perkovich	1	3
(Minnesota) Dale Gibbs	0	4

Pool B	W	L
(Ontario) Al Hackner	5	0
(Minnesota) John Shuster	4	1
(North Dakota) Steve Brown	2	3
(North Dakota) Kevin Kakela	2	3
(Manitoba) Kyle Doering	2	3
(Minnesota) Randy Baird	0	5

Pool C	W	L
(Minnesota) Matt Stevens	4	1
(Minnesota) Todd Birr	4	1
(Ontario) Mike McCarville	4	1
(North Dakota) Ryan Berg	2	3
(Minnesota) Allison Pottinger	1	4
(Minnesota) Andy Borland	0	5

== Tiebreaker ==
Team	Final
(Minnesota) Todd Birr	4
(Ontario) Mike McCarville	5

== Playoffs ==
The playoffs draw is listed as follows:

Quarterfinals
(Minnesota) John Shuster	6
(Minnesota) Eric Fenson	5
(Minnesota) Matt Stevens	3
(Ontario) Mike McCarville	5

Semifinals
(Minnesota) Pete Fenson	5
(Minnesota) John Shuster	4
(Ontario) Al Hackner	6
(Ontario) Mike McCarville	4

Final
(Minnesota) Pete Fenson	4
(Ontario) Al Hackner	6
