= 2011 Laphroaig Scotch Open =

2011 curling competition held in Madison, Wisconsin

- Host city: Madison, Wisconsin
- Arena: Madison Curling Club
- Dates: December 2–4
- Men's winner: (Minnesota) Pete Fenson
- Curling club: Bemidji CC, Bemidji
- Skip: Pete Fenson
- Third: Shawn Rojeski
- Second: Joe Polo
- Lead: Ryan Brunt
- Finalist: (Wisconsin) David Brown
- Women's winner: (Wisconsin) Erika Brown
- Curling club: Madison CC, Madison
- Skip: Erika Brown
- Third: Debbie McCormick
- Second: Ann Swisshelm
- Lead: Jessica Schultz
- Finalist: (New York (state)) Patti Lank

The 2011 Laphroaig Scotch Open was held from December 2 to 4 at the Madison Curling Club in Madison, Wisconsin as part of the 2011–12 World Curling Tour. The event was held in a triple knockout format.

== Men ==
=== Teams ===
Skip	Third	Second	Lead	Locale
Josh Bahr	Chris Bond	Atticus Wallace	John Muller	Bemidji, Minnesota
Ryan Lemke (fourth)	John Benton (skip)	Jake Will	Steve Day	Medford, Wisconsin
Todd Birr	Greg Romaniuk	Doug Pottinger	Tom O'Connor	Mankato, Minnesota
Scott Bitz	Mark Lang	Aryn Schmidt	Dean Hicke	Regina, Saskatchewan
Joey Bonfoey	Joel Dietz	Matt Carlson	Ted Trolson	Duluth, Minnesota
Craig Brown	Matt Hamilton	Kroy Nernberger	Derrick Casper	Madison, Wisconsin
David Brown	Leon Romaniuk	Jeremy Roe	Richard Maskel	Madison, Wisconsin
Brandon Corbett	Sean Murray	Mark Mooney	Michael Graziano	(New York (state)) New York
Stephen Dropkin	Korey Dropkin	Thomas Howell	Derek Corbett	Southborough, Massachusetts
Mike Farbelow	Kevin Deeren	Kraig Deeren	Tim Solin	Minneapolis, Minnesota
Pete Fenson	Shawn Rojeski	Joe Polo	Ryan Brunt	Bemidji, Minnesota
Adam Kitchens	Brandon Myhre	Alex Kitchens	Nathan Myhre	Devils Lake, North Dakota
Blake Morton	Marcus Fonger	Tommy Jusczcyk	Calvin Weber	McFarland, Wisconsin
Matt Rudig	Jon Medure	Dan Wiza	Jeff Kuemmel	Madison, Wisconsin
Derek Surka	Alex Leichter	Brian Fink	Jared Wydysh	New Haven, Connecticut
Tyler Vietanen	John Landsteiner	Matthew Collom	Robert Splinter	Duluth, Minnesota

=== Knockout results ===
==== A Event ====
First Knockout		Semifinals		Qualifier 1
(Minnesota) Todd Birr	4
(New York (state)) Brandon Corbett	8	(New York (state)) Brandon Corbett	7
(Minnesota) Mike Farbelow	3	(Connecticut) Derek Surka	4
(Connecticut) Derek Surka	5			(New York (state)) Brandon Corbett	4
(Saskatchewan) Scott Bitz	5			(Wisconsin) David Brown	5
(Minnesota) Tyler Vietanen	3	(Saskatchewan) Scott Bitz	3
(Wisconsin) John Benton	3	(Wisconsin) David Brown	4
(Wisconsin) David Brown	4

First Knockout		Semifinals		Qualifier 2
(Minnesota) Pete Fenson	6
(North Dakota) Adam Kitchens	4	(Minnesota) Pete Fenson	7
(Minnesota) Josh Bahr	7	(Minnesota) Josh Bahr	3
(Wisconsin) Blake Morton	6			(Minnesota) Pete Fenson	6
(Wisconsin) Craig Brown	4			(Wisconsin) Matt Rudig	1
(Minnesota) Joey Bonfoey	5	(Minnesota) Joey Bonfoey	6
(Massachusetts) Stephen Dropkin	1	(Wisconsin) Matt Rudig	8
(Wisconsin) Matt Rudig	8

==== B Event ====
Second Knockout		Semifinals		Qualifier 3
(Minnesota) Todd Birr	2
(Minnesota) Mike Farbelow	8	(Minnesota) Mike Farbelow	5
(Minnesota) Tyler Vietanen	3	(Wisconsin) John Benton	7
(Wisconsin) John Benton	6			(Wisconsin) John Benton	5
				(Wisconsin) Matt Rudig	2

Second Knockout		Semifinals		Qualifier 4
(North Dakota) Adam Kitchens	7
(Wisconsin) Blake Morton	5	(North Dakota) Adam Kitchens	2
(Wisconsin) Craig Brown	9	(Wisconsin) Craig Brown	8
(Massachusetts) Stephen Dropkin	2			(Wisconsin) Craig Brown	4
				(New York (state)) Brandon Corbett	8

Second Knockout		Qualifier 5
(Connecticut) Derek Surka	2
(Saskatchewan) Scott Bitz	7	(Saskatchewan) Scott Bitz	4
(Minnesota) Josh Bahr	7	(Minnesota) Josh Bahr	1
(Minnesota) Joey Bonfoey	2

==== C Event ====
Third Knockout		Semifinals		Qualifier 6
(Minnesota) Todd Birr	9
(Minnesota) Tyler Vietanen	1	(Minnesota) Todd Birr	3
		(Minnesota) Joey Bonfoey	4
				(Minnesota) Joey Bonfoey	2
				(Wisconsin) Craig Brown	7

Third Knockout		Semifinals		Qualifier 7
(Wisconsin) Blake Morton	3
(Massachusetts) Stephen Dropkin	6	(Massachusetts) Stephen Dropkin	6
		(Connecticut) Derek Surka	3
				(Massachusetts) Stephen Dropkin	8
				(Wisconsin) Matt Rudig	0

Third Knockout		Qualifier 8
(Minnesota) Mike Farbelow	6
(North Dakota) Adam Kitchens	0	(Minnesota) Mike Farbelow	6
		(Minnesota) Josh Bahr	1

=== Playoffs ===
Quarterfinals		Semifinals		Final
(Wisconsin) David Brown	6
(Minnesota) Mike Farbelow	5	(Wisconsin) David Brown	6
(Saskatchewan) Scott Bitz	7	(Saskatchewan) Scott Bitz	4
(New York (state)) Brandon Corbett	4			(Wisconsin) David Brown	4
(Minnesota) Pete Fenson	7			(Minnesota) Pete Fenson	6
(Massachusetts) Stephen Dropkin	1	(Minnesota) Pete Fenson	6
(Wisconsin) Craig Brown	4	(Wisconsin) Craig Brown	5
(Wisconsin) John Benton	3

== Women ==
=== Teams ===
Skip	Third	Second	Lead	Locale
Erika Brown	Debbie McCormick	Ann Swisshelm	Jessica Schultz	Madison, Wisconsin
Alexandra Carlson	Monica Walker	Kendall Moulton	Jordan Moulton	Minneapolis, Minnesota
Michelle DeBuck	Suzette Loeffler	Jackie Pesch		Midland, Michigan
Brigid Ellig	Heather Van Sistine	Jennifer Westhagen	Brittany Falk	St. Paul, Minnesota
Jenna Haag	Chloe Pahl	Grace Gabower	Erin Wallace	Madison, Wisconsin
Rebecca Hamilton	Tara Peterson	Karlie Koenig	Sophie Brorson	Madison, Wisconsin
Shelly Kinney	Amy Lou Anderson	Elyse Sorenson	Julie Smith	St. Paul, Minnesota
Patti Lank	Nina Spatola	Caitlin Maroldo	Mackenzie Lank	(New York (state)) Lewiston, New York
Cassandra Potter	Jamie Haskell	Jackie Lemke	Steph Sambor	St. Paul, Minnesota
Allison Pottinger	Nicole Joraanstad	Natalie Nicholson	Tabitha Peterson	St. Paul, Minnesota
Miranda Solem	Mackenzie Lank	Julie Lilla	Chelsea Solem	Grand Rapids, Minnesota
Aileen Sormunen	Courtney George	Amanda McLean	Miranda Solem	Duluth, Minnesota

=== Knockout results ===
==== A Event ====
First Knockout
(Minnesota) Alexandra Carlson	7
(Wisconsin) Jenna Haag	2
(Minnesota) Shelly Kinney	5
(Wisconsin) Rebecca Hamilton	6
(Michigan) Michelle DeBuck	2
(Minnesota) Aileen Sormunen	13
(Minnesota) Brigid Ellig	8
(Minnesota) Miranda Solem	7

Quarterfinals
(Minnesota) Alexandra Carlson	5
(Wisconsin) Erika Brown	9
(Wisconsin) Rebecca Hamilton	12
(Minnesota) Cassandra Potter	9
(Minnesota) Aileen Sormunen	4
(Minnesota) Allison Pottinger	6
(Minnesota) Brigid Ellig	4
(New York (state)) Patti Lank	6

Semifinals
(Wisconsin) Erika Brown	5
(Wisconsin) Rebecca Hamilton	2
(Minnesota) Allison Pottinger	3
(New York (state)) Patti Lank	7

Qualifier 1
(Wisconsin) Erika Brown	8
(New York (state)) Patti Lank	7

==== B Event ====
Second Knockout
(Wisconsin) Jenna Haag	9
(Minnesota) Shelly Kinney	4
(Michigan) Michelle DeBuck	5
(Minnesota) Miranda Solem	8

Semifinals
(Minnesota) Allison Pottinger	3
(Wisconsin) Jenna Haag	4
(Wisconsin) Rebecca Hamilton	11
(Minnesota) Miranda Solem	1

Qualifier 2
(Wisconsin) Jenna Haag	4
(Wisconsin) Rebecca Hamilton	5

Second Knockout		Semifinals		Qualifier 3
				(New York (state)) Patti Lank	7
(Minnesota) Alexandra Carlson	3			(Minnesota) Aileen Sormunen	6
(Minnesota) Cassandra Potter	7	(Minnesota) Cassandra Potter	2
(Minnesota) Aileen Sormunen	7	(Minnesota) Aileen Sormunen	7
(Minnesota) Brigid Ellig	4

==== C Event ====
Third Knockout		Qualifier 4
(Minnesota) Shelly Kinney	7
(Minnesota) Brigid Ellig	1	(Minnesota) Shelly Kinney	5
		(Wisconsin) Jenna Haag	3

Third Knockout		Qualifier 5
		(Minnesota) Aileen Sormunen	4
(Michigan) Michelle DeBuck	1	(Minnesota) Alexandra Carlson	5
(Minnesota) Alexandra Carlson	11

Third Knockout		Qualifier 6
(Minnesota) Allison Pottinger	8
(Minnesota) Cassandra Potter	7	(Minnesota) Allison Pottinger	6
		(Minnesota) Miranda Solem	3

=== Playoffs ===
Quarterfinals
(Minnesota) Alexandra Carlson	5
(Minnesota) Shelly Kinney	4
(Wisconsin) Rebecca Hamilton	9
(Minnesota) Allison Pottinger	7

Semifinals
(Wisconsin) Erika Brown	9
(Minnesota) Alexandra Carlson	3
(New York (state)) Patti Lank	8
(Wisconsin) Rebecca Hamilton	2

Final
(Wisconsin) Erika Brown	6
(New York (state)) Patti Lank	4
