= 2011 Curl Mesabi Cash Spiel =

- Host city: Eveleth, Minnesota
- Arena: Range Recreation and Civic Center
- Dates: December 16–18
- Men's winner: (Wisconsin) Craig Brown
- Curling club: Madison, Wisconsin
- Skip: Craig Brown
- Third: Matt Hamilton
- Second: Kroy Nernberger
- Lead: Derrick Casper
- Finalist: (Minnesota) Todd Birr
- Women's winner: (Minnesota) Cassandra Potter
- Curling club: St. Paul, Minnesota
- Skip: Cassandra Potter
- Third: Jamie Haskell
- Second: Jackie Lemke
- Lead: Steph Sambor
- Finalist: (Minnesota) Allison Pottinger

The 2011 Curl Mesabi Cash Spiel was held from December 16 to 18 at the Range Recreation and Civic Center in Eveleth, Minnesota, as part of the 2011–12 World Curling Tour. The purses for the men's and women's events were USD17,200 and USD10,000, respectively. The event was held in a round robin format.

== Men ==
=== Teams ===
Skip	Third	Second	Lead	Locale
Brian Adams Jr.	Mark Adams	Michael Makela	Phil Kennedy	Thunder Bay, Ontario
Josh Bahr	Chris Bond	Atticus Wallace	John Muller	Bemidji, Minnesota
Ryan Lemke (fourth)	John Benton (skip)	Jake Will	Steve Day	Medford, Wisconsin
Ryan Berg	Mitchell Oakland	Al Gulseth	Jordan Brown	West Fargo, North Dakota
Todd Birr	Greg Romaniuk	Doug Pottinger	Tom O'Connor	Mankato, Minnesota
Trevor Bonot	Allen Macsemchuk	Scott McCallum	Tim Jewett	Northern Ontario
Craig Brown	Matt Hamilton	Kroy Nernberger	Derrick Casper	Madison, Wisconsin
Bryan Burgess	Gary Weiss	Dale Wiersema	Pat Berezowski	Northern Ontario
Jack Carr	Gordon Williams	Joe Marques	Lance Reid	Thunder Bay, Ontario
Jeff Currie	Dylan Johnston	Cody Johnston	Mike Badiuk	Thunder Bay, Ontario
Mike Farbelow	Kevin Deeren	Kraig Deeren	Tim Solin	Minneapolis, Minnesota
Eric Fenson	Trevor Andrews	Quentin Way	Mark Lazar	Bemidji, Minnesota
Pete Fenson	Shawn Rojeski	Joe Polo	Ryan Brunt	Bemidji, Minnesota
Tyler George	Chris Plys	Rich Ruohonen	Aanders Brorson	Duluth, Minnesota
Dale Gibbs	William Raymond	James Honsvall	Merlin Eddy	Woodbury, Minnesota
Al Hackner	Kory Carr	Phill Drobnick	Jamie Childs	Thunder Bay, Ontario
Adam Kitchens	Brandon Myhre	Alex Kitchens	Nathan Myhre	Devils Lake, North Dakota
Paul Pustovar	Nick Myers	Andy Jukich	Jeff Puleo	Hibbing, Minnesota
Dan Ruehl	Joey Erjavec	Nick Ruehl	Noah Johnson	Plymouth, Minnesota
Tom Scott	Joe Roberts	Tony Wilson	Benjamin Wilson	Hibbing, Minnesota
John Shuster	Zach Jacobson	Jared Zezel	John Landsteiner	Duluth, Minnesota
Jason Smith	Jeff Isaacson	Aaron Wald	Kris Perkovich	Ft. Myers, Florida
Matt Stevens	Bob Liapis	Cody Stevens	Jeff Breyen	Bemidji, Minnesota
Peter Stolt	Jerod Roland	Brad Caldwell	Erik Ordway	St. Paul, Minnesota

=== Round Robin standings ===
Pool A	W	L
(Ontario) Al Hackner	4	1
(Minnesota) Todd Birr	4	1
(Ontario) Trevor Bonot	3	2
(North Dakota) Ryan Berg	3	2
(Minnesota) Josh Bahr	1	4
(Minnesota) Dan Ruehl	0	5

Pool B	W	L
(Wisconsin) John Benton	4	1
(Minnesota) Tyler George	4	1
(Minnesota) John Shuster	3	2
(Ontario) Jack Carr	2	3
(Minnesota) Eric Fenson	2	3
(Minnesota) Dale Gibbs	0	5

Pool C	W	L
(Wisconsin) Craig Brown	4	1
(Minnesota) Paul Pustovar	4	1
(Florida) Jason Smith	2	3
(Ontario) Bryan Burgess	2	3
(Minnesota) Tom Scott	2	3
(Minnesota) Peter Stolt	1	4

Pool D	W	L
(Ontario) Jeff Currie	4	1
(Minnesota) Pete Fenson	4	1
(Minnesota) Mike Farbelow	4	1
(Ontario) Brian Adams Jr.	2	3
(Minnesota) Matt Stevens	1	4
(North Dakota) Adam Kitchens	0	5

=== Playoffs ===
Quarterfinals
(Ontario) Al Hackner	7
(Minnesota) Tyler George	5
(Ontario) Jeff Currie	3
(Wisconsin) Craig Brown	6
(Minnesota) Paul Pustovar	3
(Minnesota) Todd Birr	7
(Wisconsin) John Benton	4
(Minnesota) Pete Fenson	6

Semifinals
(Ontario) Al Hackner	0
(Wisconsin) Craig Brown	3
(Minnesota) Todd Birr	6
(Minnesota) Pete Fenson	5

Final
(Wisconsin) Craig Brown	5
(Minnesota) Todd Birr	3

== Women ==
=== Teams ===
Skip	Third	Second	Lead	Locale
Brett Barber	Kailena Bay	Allison Cameron	Krista White	Biggar, Saskatchewan
Jerriann Gherardi				Hibbing, Minnesota
Rebecca Hamilton	Tara Peterson	Karlie Koenig	Sophie Brorson	Madison, Wisconsin
Karlee Jones	Grace Esquega	Victoria Anderson	Kim Zsakai	Thunder Bay, Ontario
Tracy Lindgren	Amy Anderson	Ann Flis	Karen Volkman	St. Paul, Minnesota
Mari Motohashi	Megumi Mabuchi	Yumi Suzuki	Akane Eda	Kitami, Japan
Cassandra Potter	Jamie Haskell	Jackie Lemke	Steph Sambor	St. Paul, Minnesota
Allison Pottinger	Nicole Joraanstad	Natalie Nicholson	Tabitha Peterson	St. Paul, Minnesota
Aileen Sormunen	Courtney George	Amanda McLean	Miranda Solem	Duluth, Minnesota
Maureen Stolt	Megan Pond	Emilia Juocys	Sherri Schummer	St. Paul, Minnesota

=== Round Robin standings ===
Pool A	W	L
(Wisconsin) Rebecca Hamilton	3	1
(Minnesota) Cassandra Potter	3	1
(Minnesota) Maureen Stolt	2	2
(Japan) Mari Motohashi	1	3
(Ontario) Karlee Jones	1	3

Pool B	W	L
(Minnesota) Allison Pottinger	4	0
(Saskatchewan) Brett Barber	3	1
(Minnesota) Aileen Sormunen	2	2
(Minnesota) Tracy Lindgren	1	3
(Minnesota) Jerriann Gherardi	0	3

=== Playoffs ===
Semifinals
1	(Minnesota) Cassandra Potter	6
4	(Saskatchewan) Brett Barber	5
3	(Minnesota) Allison Pottinger	5
2	(Wisconsin) Rebecca Hamilton	2

Final
(Minnesota) Cassandra Potter	7
(Minnesota) Allison Pottinger	3
