= Chris Dolan =

Scottish novelist, poet and playwright

- Born: 1957 (age 68–69); Glasgow, Scotland
- Occupations: Novelist, poet and playwright

Chris Dolan (born 1957, Glasgow, Scotland) is a Scottish novelist, poet, and playwright. He is a lecturer in English Literature at Glasgow Caledonian University and is Programme Leader of the master's degree programme in Television Screenwriting there.

== Career ==
Dolan has published four novels (Ascension Day, Redlegs, Potter's Field and Aliyyah), two collections of short stories and two non-fiction books. He has had three full-length stage plays produced internationally, with five shorter pieces and four collaborations with Spanish dramatists. He has written over 50 hours of television, and more of radio drama. He has worked in collaboration with visual artists on several pieces of public art, has published poems, broadcasts regularly and writes for Scottish and London newspapers.

He also translates and adapts drama from Spanish, including Short Spin and Wheesht, and translates his own work into Spanish.

=== Novels ===
- Ascension Day (Headline Review, 1999) won the McKitterick First Novel Prize.

"…Dolan's post-industrial and post-imperialist Glasgow: "[s]uch quiet, modest little groupings of streets, yet their shadow stretched and fell for thousands of miles, as afar as Africa, India, America." This long-range view gives the novel great power, as Dolan draws his characters inexorably together, in the lost, once-great, city on the Clyde." – Christopher Hart, Scottish Review of Books.

- Redlegs (Vagabond Voices, 2012)

"Good things come to those who wait, and this is a good thing… An engrossing and compelling novel... lingering richly in the memory… A fine novel" – The Scotsman.

=== Short stories ===
Poor Angels (Polygon, 1995) was shortlisted for the Saltire Prize, and included both the winning story for 1995 Scotland on Sunday / Macallan Prize (Sleet and Snow), and runner-up the following year (Year of the Vezzas).

"He holds you in a tight grip right from the start and manages to combine a sense of raw nostalgia with a profoundly moving atmosphere of love and loss." – Scotland on Sunday on Sleet and Snow.

=== Non-fiction titles ===
An Anarchist's Story: The Life of Ethel MacDonald (Birlinn 2009)

"Dolan's book is both personal and universal." – The Scotsman.

=== Plays ===
His plays include The Veil (1991), Sabina (1998), The Reader (2000) and The Angel's Share (2000).

=== Writing for screen and radio ===
Some of his work has appeared on the radio, including four original plays and many adaptations, including Umberto Eco's Name of the Rose, The Master of Ballantrae by Robert Louis Stevenson and several of Ian Rankin's Rebus novels. His four-part modern take on Strange Case of Dr Jekyll and Mr Hyde was broadcast in October 2012.

He has written for BBC Radio Scotland, BBC Radio 3, and BBC Radio 4. He has written such screenplays as Poor Angels and Ring of Truth as well as TV drama documentaries such as An Anarchist's Story: The Life of Ethel MacDonald and Barbado'ed both broadcast by BBC and Red Oil for Channel 4. He also has written extensively for Taggart, Take the High Road, Machair (TV series), and River City for which he has been writing since its inception.

=== Awards ===
- 1995: Macallan/Scotland on Sunday Short Story Competition, Sleet and Snow
- 1995: Saltire Society Scottish First Book of the Year Award, Poor Angels and Other Stories, shortlist
- 1996: Edinburgh Festival Fringe First for Sabina!
- 1999: Canongate Prize for Journalism
- 1999: Macallan/Scotland on Sunday Short Story Competition, Year of the Vezzas
- 1999: Robert Louis Stevenson Memorial Award
- 2000: McKitterick Prize, Ascension Day

== Bibliography and other works ==
=== Fiction ===
Novels

- Aliyyah (Vagabond Voices, 2015)
- Potter's End (Vagabond Voices, 2014)
- Ascension Day (Hodder Headline Review, 1999)
- Redlegs (Vagabond Voices, 2012)

Short stories

- Hour After Hour (Pathfinder, 2008)
- Poor Angels (Polygon, 1996)

=== Non-Fiction ===
Books

- John Lennon, The Original Beatle. Biography (Argyll, 2011)
- An Anarchist's Story: The Life of Ethel MacDonald (Birlinn, 2009)

Plays

- The Veil (1991)
- Sabina! (1995)
- 3 Fallen Angels (1997)
- The Angels’ Share (2000)
- The Reader (2005)
- Leather Bound and Double Shot short plays for Play, Pie & Pint, series (2005/2006)
- Short Spin and Wheesht, Zarraberri and Limbo, all translations of plays for Play, Pie & Pint (2006)
- Hephaistos (2008)
- The Kist (2011)

Radio drama

- Sabina ! (BBC Radio 4, 2000)
- 120 Rue de la Gare (adaptation of French thriller, BBC Radio 4, 2001)
- Of Love & Other Demons (Gabriel García Márquez novel, BBC Radio 3 2002)
- The Master of Ballantrae (adaptation of Robert Louis Stevenson's novel, BBC Radio 4, 2005)
- Mission to Marseilles (adaptation of French thriller, 2004)
- The Name of the Rose (adaptation of Umberto Eco's novel BBC Radio 4, 2006)
- The Observations (adaptation of a Jane Harris novel, Woman's Hour, 2007)
- The Tenderness of Wolves (adaptation of Stef Penney novel, Woman's Hour, 2007)
- The Black Sheep (Honoré de Balzac, BBC Radio 4, 2008)
- Black and Blue (Ian Rankin Rebus adaptation, BBC Radio 4, 2008)
- The Dead Hour (adaptation of Denise Mina nove, 2009)
- Blue Water (original play for BBC Radio Scotland, 2009)
- Strip Jack (Rebus novel for BBC Radio 4, 2011)
- House of Mercy (co-written with Bruce Young, Woman's Hour, 2011)
- Dr. Hyde (original updating of Robert Louis Stevenson's classic, Radio Scotland, 2012)
- The Black Book (Rebus adaptation, 2012)

Television drama

- River City (BBC Scotland, 2004–)
- Taggart (STV, 2004–2008)
- Burns – Alive & Kicking (6 dramas on Robert Burns, Channel 4, 1998)
- Machair (Gaelic serial drama, team writer, 1996–1998)
- High Road (STV, Resident writer 1992–1998)
- The X File(drama-docs on Scottish Democracy, Channel 4 1999–2000)

Film

- Poor Angels (1996)
- Ring of Truth (1998, BBC Scotland)
- Mistgate (1999)

Television, DOC

- An Anarchist's Story: The Life of Ethel MacDonald (writer, BBC drama documentary, 2007)
- Barbado’ed (writer, presenter, producer, doc BBC/TG4/RDF)
- Red Oil (co-writer, Mediaco/Channel 4 doc on Chavez's Venezuela, 2009)
- Don Roberto (co-writer, Caledonia Films, BBC Scotland, 2008)
- Eurokids (writer and presenter, 3 series 1992–1995 of 6 programs each on young Europeans)
- Alba Na 70's (6-part series for STV 1993)

Radio Writer/presenter Inc's

- Edge of the World (documentary series Radio Scotland, 2001)
- Cover Stories (writer and presenter, Radio Scotland's weekly book programme, 2003–2005)
- Mingin’ (writer and presenter 60' doc. on sense of smell, Radio Scotland, 2002)
- Sunday Morning (writer and presenter doc on Scotland's Sundays, 2003)
- Letter from Caribbean & Northern Arts (Radio 3 Interval Talks, 2002)
- The Last Communard (on French Revolution, BBC Radio Scotland, 2007)
- Lad o’Pairts (series on Scottish Education, Radio Scotland, 2003–2004)
- On The Shelf (6 part series on Scots and their book collections, Radio Scotland, 2003)
- Fire! 60 (Hogmanay special on fire & light, Radio 4, 2003)
- The Last Tutor (writer and presenter; 60” doc. Radio Scotland, 2004)
- The Real Macbeth (Radio Scotland, 5 part series, 2007)

Poetry

- Published in: Chapman, Mariscat. Scottish & Glasgow collections

== Prizes ==
- Macallan/Scotland on Sunday Short Story Prize (1995; Finalist, 1998)
- Edinburgh Festival Fringe First (1996)
- Scottish Screenwriters' Award (1992)
- Robert Louis Stevenson Memorial Award (1999)
- Canongate Prize, for journalism (1999)
- Mckitterick,1st Novel Prize (2000)

== Personal life ==
He is married to Moira Dolan and they currently live in Glasgow with their children.
