= Alexander Attinger =

Swiss curler from Dübendorf

- Curler
- Born: 8 January 1986 (age 40)

Team
- Curling club: CC Dübendorf, Dübendorf
- Skip: Alexander Attinger
- Third: Felix Attinger
- Second: Daniel Schifferli
- Lead: Simon Attinger
- Alternate: Andre Neuenschwander

Alexander Attinger (born 8 January 1986) is a Swiss curler from Dübendorf.

Attinger has played in one international event, the 2006 World Junior Curling Championships. He was the alternate on the Swiss team, but ended up playing in six games. The team, skipped by Christian von Gunten finished in 8th place.

Attinger has played on the World Curling Tour since 2007 when he played in that year's Swiss Cup Basel. Attinger's best event to date was losing the 2012 DEKALB Superspiel final to William Lyburn.
