= Simon Dupuis =

Canadian curler

Simon Dupuis (born c. 1974) is a Canadian curler from Thurso, Quebec.

== Career ==
Dupuis is a former provincial mixed champion, having won the 2008 provincial championship with teammates Isabelle Néron, Jean-François Charest and Marie-Josee Precourt. The team represented Quebec at the 2008 Canadian Mixed Curling Championship in Calgary. They finished with a 7–4 record, in a tie for third with Nova Scotia's Peter Burgess. The team lost in the tie-breaker match against Nova Scotia and were eliminated.

Dupuis has competed in many World Curling Tour events in his career, mostly events in his home province of Quebec or in Eastern Ontario. He has played skip for most of his career, except for in 2004-05 when he played third for Dan Lemery and in 2011-12 when he played for Don Westphal. Dupuis has most recently won the inaugural 2012 Vic Open with teammates Louis Biron, Frederic Boulanger, and Maurice Cayouette.
