= Eveleth =

Eveleth is a surname. Notable people with the surname include:

- Decker Eveleth, American researcher
- Rose Eveleth, American podcast host, producer, designer, and animator

== See also ==
- Eveleth, Minnesota
