= 2023 United States Curling Senior National Championship =

Sports event in Seattle, Washington

- Host city: Seattle, Washington
- Arena: Granite CC
- Dates: March 6–11, 2023
- Men's winner: (Washington (state)) Team Larway
- Curling club: Granite CC
- Skip: Joel Larway
- Third: Doug Kauffman
- Second: Darren Lehto
- Lead: John Rasmussen
- Finalist: (Minnesota) Team Farbelow
- Women's winner: (Minnesota) Team Smith
- Curling club: St. Paul CC
- Skip: Margie Smith
- Third: Ann Swisshelm
- Second: Shelly Kosal
- Lead: Shelley Dropkin
- Finalist: (Wisconsin) Team Lawless

The 2023 United States Senior Curling Championships were held from March 6 to 11, 2023 at the Granite Curling Club in Seattle, Washington. The men's and women's events were held in conjunction with each other. In the men's event final, Team Joel Larway defeated Team Mike Farbelow 4–3. In the women's event final, Team Margie Smith defeated Team Tracy Lawless 8–7. Both Team Larway and Team Smith went on to represent the United States at the 2023 World Senior Curling Championships in Gangneung, South Korea.

== Men's Event ==
=== Teams ===
The men's teams are listed as follows

Skip	Third	Second	Lead	Alternate	Locale
Alex Tschumakow (Fourth)	Keith Dropkin (Skip)	Dick Dawson	Timothy Luehrman		Wayland, Massachusetts
Mike Farbelow	Rich Ruohonen	Bill Stopera	Tim Solin		St Paul, Minnesota
Chris Hester	Thomas Lee	Jeff Wick	Phil Shyrock		(Washington (state)) Seattle, Washington
Benj Gusman (Fourth)	Timothy Ho (Skip)	Mike Sampson	Paul Marseglia		Wayland, Massachusetts
Darryl Horsman	Dave Sciacero	Brian Onken	Ray Sidney		Phoenix, Arizona
Murray Jackson	Kim Hicks	Brian Chick	Mario Riveron		Raleigh, North Carolina
Joel Larway	Doug Kauffman	Darren Lehto	John Rasmussen		(Washington (state)) Seattle, Washington
Bob LeClair	Fred Maxie	Jeff Baird	Tom Danielson	Greg Gallagher	Tempe, Arizona
Fred Leichter	Andy McKellips	Alan Berndt	Marty Blomgren		Wayland, Massachusetts
Nate Levin	Brian Gore	Chad Hessoun	Ryan Doerfler	Tim Eng	(Washington (state)) Seattle, Washington
Phil Moir	Jay Bata	David Brekke	Stephen Wolfe	Alan Batchen	Denver, Colorado
Paul Pustovar	Ross Litman	Dan Wiza	Mike Kniffin		Hibbing, Minnesota
Seppo Sormunen	Glen Novak	Kent Brorson	Michael Huska		Duluth, Minnesota
Mark Tolvstad	Bryan Rau	Charlie Maring	Mark Becking		Sioux Falls, South Dakota
Greg Torkelson	Jeff Elborne	Scott Gerstenkorn	Oivind Naess		Chicago, Illinois
Todd Ussatis	David Pengilly	Curt Bradbury	John Lambert		Bismarck, North Dakota
Jeff Wright	Steve Waters	Sean Silver	Russ Brown	Chris Schallmo	Chicago, Illinois

=== Round-Robin Standings ===
Key
Teams to playoffs

Pool A
Skip	W	L
(Minnesota) Mike Farbelow	4	0
(Massachusetts) Timothy Ho	2	2
(North Carolina) Murray Jackson	2	2
(North Dakota) Todd Ussatis	2	2
(Massachusetts) Fred Leichter	0	4

Pool B
Skip	W	L
(Washington (state)) Joel Larway	5	0
(Illinois) Jeff Wright	4	1
(Minnesota) Seppo Sormunen	3	2
(Colorado) Phil Moir	2	3
(Illinois) Greg Torkelson	1	4
(Washington (state)) Nate Levin	0	5

Pool C
Skip	W	L
(Minnesota) Paul Pustovar	4	1
(Arizona) Bob Leclair	3	2
(Massachusetts) Keith Dropkin	3	2
(Washington (state)) Chris Hester	3	2
(Arizona) Darryl Horsman	1	4
(South Dakota) Mark Tolvstad	1	4

=== Round-Robin Results ===
All draw times are listed in Pacific Standard Time (UTC−08:00).The first team listed for each match threw the red stones.

==== Draw 1 ====
Monday, March 6, 8:30pm

Sheet 1	1	2	3	4	5	6	7	8	9	10	Final
(Illinois) Jeff Wright 🔨	1	0	1	0	1	0	2	1	0	X	6
(Washington (state)) Joel Larway	0	2	0	2	0	2	0	0	1	X	7

Sheet 2	1	2	3	4	5	6	7	8	9	10	Final
(Minnesota) Seppo Sormunen 🔨	0	0	4	0	1	1	2	X	X	X	8
(Washington (state)) Nate Levin	4	1	0	1	0	0	0	X	X	X	6

Sheet 3	1	2	3	4	5	6	7	8	9	10	Final
(Colorado) Phil Moir 🔨	3	3	1	1	0	2	X	X	X	X	10
(Illinois) Greg Torkelson	0	0	0	0	1	0	X	X	X	X	1

Sheet 4	1	2	3	4	5	6	7	8	9	10	Final
(Minnesota) Mike Farbelow	1	0	2	0	4	0	2	X	X	X	9
(Massachusetts) Fred Leichter 🔨	0	1	0	2	0	1	0	X	X	X	4

Sheet 5	1	2	3	4	5	6	7	8	9	10	Final
(North Carolina) Murray Jackson	1	1	0	1	0	2	0	2	1	X	8
(Massachusetts) Timothy Ho 🔨	0	0	4	0	2	0	0	0	X	X	7

==== Draw 2 ====
Tuesday, March 7, 8:00am

Sheet 2	1	2	3	4	5	6	7	8	9	10	Final
(Massachusetts) Keith Dropkin 🔨	1	1	2	2	1	0	X	X	X	X	7
(South Dakota) Mark Tolvstad	0	0	0	0	0	1	X	X	X	X	1

Sheet 3	1	2	3	4	5	6	7	8	9	10	Final
(Arizona) Darryl Horsman 🔨	5	0	2	0	0	0	6	X	X	X	13
(Washington (state)) Chris Hester	0	1	0	2	2	2	0	X	X	X	7

Sheet 4	1	2	3	4	5	6	7	8	9	10	Final
(Arizona) Bob Leclair 🔨	0	1	0	0	0	0	X	X	X	X	1
(Minnesota) Paul Pustovar	0	0	2	1	4	1	X	X	X	X	8

==== Draw 3 ====
Tuesday, March 7, 12:00pm

Sheet 2	1	2	3	4	5	6	7	8	9	10	Final
(Massachusetts) Timothy Ho 🔨	1	0	2	0	2	0	1	0	X	X	6
(Minnesota) Mike Farbelow	0	2	0	1	0	2	0	2	X	X	7

Sheet 3	1	2	3	4	5	6	7	8	9	10	Final
(Massachusetts) Fred Leichter	0	1	0	2	0	0	2	X	X	X	5
(North Dakota) Todd Ussatis 🔨	2	0	1	0	0	4	0	X	X	X	7

==== Draw 4 ====
Tuesday, March 7, 4:00pm

Sheet 1	1	2	3	4	5	6	7	8	9	10	Final
(Minnesota) Seppo Sormunen 🔨	1	0	2	0	2	1	0	X	X	X	6
(Colorado) Phil Moir	0	1	0	1	0	0	1	X	X	X	3

Sheet 3	1	2	3	4	5	6	7	8	9	10	Final
(Washington (state)) Nate Levin	0	0	1	0	1	0	X	X	X	X	2
(Washington (state)) Joel Larway 🔨	3	3	0	3	0	1	X	X	X	X	10

Sheet 5	1	2	3	4	5	6	7	8	9	10	Final
(Illinois) Jeff Wright 🔨	0	2	0	4	1	1	X	X	X	X	8
(Illinois) Greg Torkelson	0	0	1	0	0	0	X	X	X	X	1

==== Draw 5 ====
Tuesday, March 7, 8:00pm

Sheet 1	1	2	3	4	5	6	7	8	9	10	Final
(Minnesota) Mike Farbelow	0	0	3	0	1	0	2	X	X	X	6
(North Carolina) Murray Jackson 🔨	1	1	0	1	0	1	0	X	X	X	4

Sheet 3	1	2	3	4	5	6	7	8	9	10	Final
(South Dakota) Mark Tolvstad	0	2	0	0	2	0	0	X	X	X	4
(Minnesota) Paul Pustovar 🔨	2	0	2	1	0	2	2	X	X	X	9

Sheet 4	1	2	3	4	5	6	7	8	9	10	Final
(Massachusetts) Keith Dropkin 🔨	2	0	1	0	2	2	1	X	X	X	8
(Arizona) Darryl Horsman	0	1	0	2	0	0	0	X	X	X	3

Sheet 5	1	2	3	4	5	6	7	8	9	10	Final
(Arizona) Bob Leclair 🔨	2	0	0	2	0	2	2	X	X	X	8
(Washington (state)) Chris Hester	0	1	0	0	2	0	0	X	X	X	3

==== Draw 6 ====
Wednesday, March 8, 8:00am

Sheet 2	1	2	3	4	5	6	7	8	9	10	Final
(Washington (state)) Joel Larway 🔨	3	0	0	3	0	3	X	X	X	X	9
(Illinois) Greg Torkelson	0	0	0	0	2	0	X	X	X	X	2

Sheet 3	1	2	3	4	5	6	7	8	9	10	Final
(Illinois) Jeff Wright 🔨	0	1	0	4	0	1	1	2	X	X	9
(Minnesota) Seppo Sormunen	1	0	0	0	2	0	0	0	X	X	3

Sheet 4	1	2	3	4	5	6	7	8	9	10	Final
(North Dakota) Todd Ussatis	1	0	0	0	X	X	X	X	X	X	1
(Massachusetts) Timothy Ho 🔨	0	4	4	1	X	X	X	X	X	X	9

Sheet 5	1	2	3	4	5	6	7	8	9	10	Final
(Washington (state)) Nate Levin	0	0	0	0	1	0	X	X	X	X	1
(Colorado) Phil Moir 🔨	1	6	2	1	0	2	X	X	X	X	12

==== Draw 7 ====
Wednesday, March 8, 12:00pm

Sheet 1	1	2	3	4	5	6	7	8	9	10	Final
(South Dakota) Mark Tolvstad 🔨	5	1	1	1	0	1	X	X	X	X	9
(Arizona) Darryl Horsman	0	0	0	0	1	0	X	X	X	X	1

Sheet 2	1	2	3	4	5	6	7	8	9	10	Final
(Minnesota) Paul Pustovar 🔨	0	0	2	0	0	3	0	0	X	X	5
(Washington (state)) Chris Hester	1	2	0	1	1	0	1	2	X	X	8

Sheet 3	1	2	3	4	5	6	7	8	9	10	Final
(Arizona) Bob Leclair	0	2	0	0	1	0	1	0	X	X	4
(Massachusetts) Keith Dropkin 🔨	1	0	0	2	0	1	0	1	X	X	5

==== Draw 8 ====
Wednesday, March 8, 4:00pm

Sheet 1	1	2	3	4	5	6	7	8	9	10	Final
(Massachusetts) Timothy Ho 🔨	1	0	2	1	1	0	3	X	X	X	8
(Massachusetts) Fred Leichter	0	2	0	0	0	1	0	X	X	X	3

Sheet 2	1	2	3	4	5	6	7	8	9	10	Final
(North Carolina) Murray Jackson	1	1	0	1	0	0	0	X	X	X	3
(North Dakota) Todd Ussatis 🔨	0	0	4	0	0	3	1	X	X	X	8

==== Draw 9 ====
Wednesday, March 8, 8:00pm

Sheet 1	1	2	3	4	5	6	7	8	9	10	Final
(Illinois) Greg Torkelson	0	1	0	0	0	0	X	X	X	X	1
(Minnesota) Seppo Sormunen 🔨	2	0	4	0	1	3	X	X	X	X	10

Sheet 4	1	2	3	4	5	6	7	8	9	10	Final
(Washington (state)) Nate Levin	0	0	1	0	0	2	0	X	X	X	3
(Illinois) Jeff Wright 🔨	2	1	0	0	3	0	1	X	X	X	7

Sheet 5	1	2	3	4	5	6	7	8	9	10	Final
(Colorado) Phil Moir	0	0	0	0	1	0	3	0	X	X	4
(Washington (state)) Joel Larway 🔨	3	0	1	1	0	1	0	1	X	X	7

==== Draw 10 ====
Thursday, March 9, 9:00am

Sheet 3	1	2	3	4	5	6	7	8	9	10	Final
(Minnesota) Paul Pustovar	2	1	0	0	1	1	0	2	X	X	7
(Arizona) Darryl Horsman 🔨	0	0	2	1	0	0	1	0	X	X	4

Sheet 4	1	2	3	4	5	6	7	8	9	10	Final
(Washington (state)) Chris Hester 🔨	3	3	0	0	1	0	3	X	X	X	10
(Massachusetts) Keith Dropkin	0	0	2	1	0	3	0	X	X	X	6

Sheet 5	1	2	3	4	5	6	7	8	9	10	Final
(South Dakota) Mark Tolvstad	0	2	0	0	0	0	X	X	X	X	2
(Arizona) Bob Leclair 🔨	1	0	2	2	0	4	X	X	X	X	9

==== Draw 11 ====
Thursday, March 9, 2:00pm

Sheet 1	1	2	3	4	5	6	7	8	9	10	Final
(Colorado) Phil Moir	0	0	2	1	0	0	1	0	X	X	4
(Illinois) Jeff Wright 🔨	2	2	0	0	0	1	0	1	X	X	6

Sheet 2	1	2	3	4	5	6	7	8	9	10	Final
(Massachusetts) Fred Leichter	0	0	1	0	1	0	X	X	X	X	2
(North Carolina) Murray Jackson 🔨	2	1	0	3	0	1	X	X	X	X	7

Sheet 3	1	2	3	4	5	6	7	8	9	10	Final
(North Dakota) Todd Ussatis	1	0	2	0	1	0	0	X	X	X	4
(Minnesota) Mike Farbelow 🔨	0	3	0	2	0	1	1	X	X	X	7

Sheet 4	1	2	3	4	5	6	7	8	9	10	Final
(Washington (state)) Joel Larway	1	2	0	2	0	0	2	X	X	X	7
(Minnesota) Seppo Sormunen 🔨	0	0	1	0	1	2	0	X	X	X	4

Sheet 5	1	2	3	4	5	6	7	8	9	10	Final
(Illinois) Greg Torkelson	0	1	2	0	0	0	2	X	X	X	5
(Washington (state)) Nate Levin 🔨	0	0	0	1	1	0	0	X	X	X	2

==== Draw 12 ====
Thursday, March 9, 7:00pm

No men's matches took place during Draw 12.

==== Draw 13 ====
Friday, March 10, 9:00am

Sheet 1	1	2	3	4	5	6	7	8	9	10	Final
(Minnesota) Paul Pustovar 🔨	2	1	1	0	4	X	X	X	X	X	8
(Massachusetts) Keith Dropkin	0	0	0	1	0	X	X	X	X	X	1

Sheet 2	1	2	3	4	5	6	7	8	9	10	Final
(Arizona) Darryl Horsman	1	0	2	0	1	0	0	1	X	X	5
(Arizona) Bob Leclair 🔨	0	1	0	2	0	1	2	0	X	X	6

Sheet 5	1	2	3	4	5	6	7	8	9	10	Final
(Washington (state)) Chris Hester 🔨	1	3	0	0	1	3	1	X	X	X	9
(South Dakota) Mark Tolvstad	0	0	1	1	0	0	0	X	X	X	2

==== Draw - Tiebreaker ====
Friday, March 10, 2:00pm

Sheet 2	1	2	3	4	5	6	7	8	9	10	Final
(Massachusetts) Timothy Ho 🔨	2	3	2	2	X	X	X	X	X	X	9
(North Dakota) Todd Ussatis	0	0	0	0	X	X	X	X	X	X	0

Sheet 4	1	2	3	4	5	6	7	8	9	10	Final
(Arizona) Bob Leclair	0	4	0	0	2	0	3	X	X	X	9
(Massachusetts) Keith Dropkin 🔨	1	0	1	1	0	1	0	X	X	X	4

=== Playoffs ===
Friday, March 10 - 7:00pm
4	(Arizona) Bob Leclair 🔨	6
5	(Massachusetts) Timothy Ho	4
3	(Illinois) Jeff Wright 🔨	4
6	(Minnesota) Mike Farbelow	6

Saturday, March 11 - 10:00am
1	(Washington (state)) Joel Larway 🔨	6
(Arizona) Bob Leclair	4
2	(Minnesota) Paul Pustovar 🔨	7
(Minnesota) Mike Farbelow	8

Saturday, March 11 - 3:00pm
(Washington (state)) Joel Larway	4
(Minnesota) Mike Farbelow 🔨	3
Third place
(Arizona) Bob Leclair	3
(Minnesota) Paul Pustovar 🔨	9

==== Quarterfinals ====
Friday, March 10, 7:00pm

===== 3 v. 6 =====
Sheet 3	1	2	3	4	5	6	7	8	9	10	Final
(Arizona) Bob Leclair 🔨	1	0	0	1	0	0	3	1	X	X	6
(Massachusetts) Timothy Ho	0	2	0	0	1	1	0	0	X	X	4

===== 4 v. 5 =====
Sheet 5	1	2	3	4	5	6	7	8	9	10	Final
(Illinois) Jeff Wright 🔨	2	0	1	0	0	1	0	0	0	X	4
(Minnesota) Mike Farbelow	0	1	0	2	0	0	0	1	2	X	6

==== Semifinals ====
Saturday, March 11, 10:00am

===== 1 v. 3 =====
Sheet 4	1	2	3	4	5	6	7	8	9	10	Final
(Washington (state)) Joel Larway 🔨	2	0	0	2	0	0	0	2	X	X	6
(Arizona) Bob Leclair	0	1	1	0	2	0	0	0	X	X	4

===== 2 v. 5 =====
Sheet 2	1	2	3	4	5	6	7	8	9	10	Final
(Minnesota) Paul Pustovar 🔨	1	0	3	0	2	0	1	0	X	X	7
(Minnesota) Mike Farbelow	0	1	0	2	0	3	0	2	X	X	8

==== Bronze Match ====
Saturday, March 11, 3:00pm

Sheet 5	1	2	3	4	5	6	7	8	9	10	Final
(Arizona) Bob Leclair	0	2	0	1	0	X	X	X	X	X	3
(Minnesota) Paul Pustovar 🔨	3	0	4	0	2	X	X	X	X	X	9

==== Finals ====
Saturday, March 11, 3:00pm

Sheet 3	1	2	3	4	5	6	7	8	9	10	Final
(Washington (state)) Joel Larway 🔨	0	0	0	1	1	0	0	2	X	X	4
(Minnesota) Mike Farbelow	0	0	1	0	0	1	1	0	X	X	3

2023 United States Senior Men's Curling Champion
(Washington (state))
Joel Larway
2nd United States Senior Men's Curling Championship title

== Women's Event ==
=== Teams ===
The women's teams are listed as follows

Skip	Third	Second	Lead	Alternate	Locale
Debra Aubrey	Lu Brock	Tracey Drummond	Karen Cole	Christy Trageton	Tempe, Arizona
Susan Carothers	Martha Hanlon	Joanne Hufman	Margaret Mannix		Fairbanks, Alaska
Susan Dukes	Angela Montgomery	Stephanie Erstad	Anne Gravel		Madison, Wisconsin
Margaret Lawler	Judith Cantlin	Tina Young	Margaret Velie		Wayland, Massachusetts
Tracy Lawless	Leslie MacGregor	Lisa Johnson	Elizabeth Demers		Milwaukee, Wisconsin
Sheila Mariano	Lori Markham	Lisa Raulik	Kara McBroom		(Washington (state)) Seattle, Washington
Cynthia Smith	Dena Rosenberry	Michelle Page	Nancy Maule		Bozeman, Montana
Margie Smith	Ann Swisshelm	Shelly Kosal	Shelley Dropkin		St. Paul, Minnesota
Cyndie Sweet	Doreen Deaver	Jacqueline Clark	Nadyne Krienke		(Washington (state)) Seattle, Washington
Lisa Tamura	Kathy Placek	Kristine Klinkhammer	Anne Meagher		Beaverton, Oregon
Kimberly Wapola	Lea Ann Tarnowski	Lisa Bachmeier	Juliana Klocek		St. Paul, Minnesota

=== Round-Robin Standings ===
Key
Teams to playoffs

Pool A
Skip	W	L
(Washington (state)) Sheila Mariano	3	1
(Minnesota) Margie Smith	3	1
(Arizona) Debra Aubrey	2	2
(Alaska) Susan Carothers	2	2
(Massachusetts) Margaret Lawler	0	4

Pool B
Skip	W	L
(Wisconsin) Tracy Lawless	5	0
(Wisconsin) Susan Dukes	4	1
(Minnesota) Kimberly Wapola	3	2
(Montana) Cynthia Smith	2	3
(Oregon) Lisa Tamura	1	4
(Washington (state)) Cyndie Sweet	0	5

=== Round-Robin Results ===
All draw times are listed in Pacific Standard Time (UTC−08:00).The first team listed for each match threw the red stones.

==== Draw 1 ====
Monday, March 6, 8:30pm

No women's matches took place during Draw 1.

==== Draw 2 ====
Tuesday, March 7, 8:00am

Sheet 1	1	2	3	4	5	6	7	8	9	10	Final
(Minnesota) Margie Smith 🔨	0	3	5	4	0	0	X	X	X	X	12
(Washington (state)) Sheila Mariano	1	0	0	0	2	0	X	X	X	X	3

Sheet 5	1	2	3	4	5	6	7	8	9	10	Final
(Alaska) Susan Carothers	0	3	0	0	0	2	0	X	X	X	5
(Arizona) Debra Aubrey 🔨	2	0	3	1	1	0	1	X	X	X	8

==== Draw 3 ====
Tuesday, March 7, 12:00pm

Sheet 1	1	2	3	4	5	6	7	8	9	10	Final
(Wisconsin) Susan Dukes	0	3	2	0	0	2	0	0	X	X	7
(Wisconsin) Tracy Lawless 🔨	2	0	0	2	1	0	2	1	X	X	8

Sheet 4	1	2	3	4	5	6	7	8	9	10	Final
(Montana) Cynthia Smith 🔨	4	0	2	1	0	1	1	X	X	X	9
(Oregon) Lisa Tamura	0	1	0	0	2	0	0	X	X	X	3

Sheet 5	1	2	3	4	5	6	7	8	9	10	Final
(Minnesota) Kimberly Wapola 🔨	1	0	2	4	0	1	1	X	X	X	9
(Washington (state)) Cyndie Sweet	0	2	0	0	1	0	0	X	X	X	3

==== Draw 4 ====
Tuesday, March 7, 4:00pm

Sheet 2	1	2	3	4	5	6	7	8	9	10	Final
(Washington (state)) Sheila Mariano 🔨	1	2	2	3	1	0	1	X	X	X	10
(Massachusetts) Margaret Lawler	0	0	0	0	0	4	0	X	X	X	4

Sheet 4	1	2	3	4	5	6	7	8	9	10	Final
(Alaska) Susan Carothers 🔨	1	0	1	0	0	2	0	0	X	X	4
(Minnesota) Margie Smith	0	1	0	1	0	0	3	2	X	X	7

==== Draw 5 ====
Tuesday, March 7, 8:00pm

Sheet 2	1	2	3	4	5	6	7	8	9	10	Final
(Oregon) Lisa Tamura	4	0	4	0	1	0	0	1	0	X	10
(Wisconsin) Tracy Lawless 🔨	0	4	0	1	0	4	1	0	1	X	11

==== Draw 6 ====
Wednesday, March 8, 8:00am

Sheet 1	1	2	3	4	5	6	7	8	9	10	Final
(Montana) Cynthia Smith 🔨	1	1	0	0	0	0	0	X	X	X	2
(Minnesota) Kimberly Wapola	0	0	2	1	0	2	4	X	X	X	9

==== Draw 7 ====
Wednesday, March 8, 12:00pm

Sheet 4	1	2	3	4	5	6	7	8	9	10	Final
(Massachusetts) Margaret Lawler 🔨	0	2	0	0	1	0	0	X	X	X	3
(Alaska) Susan Carothers	3	0	1	2	0	1	3	X	X	X	10

Sheet 5	1	2	3	4	5	6	7	8	9	10	Final
(Minnesota) Margie Smith	0	0	3	0	0	2	0	0	0	X	5
(Arizona) Debra Aubry 🔨	1	1	0	1	0	0	1	1	1	X	6

==== Draw 8 ====
Wednesday, March 8, 4:00pm

Sheet 3	1	2	3	4	5	6	7	8	9	10	Final
(Oregon) Lisa Tamura 🔨	2	1	0	2	1	0	0	1	X	X	7
(Minnesota) Kimberly Wapola	0	0	6	0	0	2	1	0	X	X	9

Sheet 4	1	2	3	4	5	6	7	8	9	10	Final
(Wisconsin) Tracy Lawless 🔨	0	3	2	1	1	0	X	X	X	X	7
(Washington (state)) Cyndie Sweet	1	0	0	0	0	1	X	X	X	X	2

Sheet 5	1	2	3	4	5	6	7	8	9	10	Final
(Wisconsin) Susan Dukes	0	2	1	4	1	0	3	X	X	X	11
(Montana) Cynthia Smith 🔨	1	0	0	0	0	2	0	X	X	X	3

==== Draw 9 ====
Wednesday, March 8, 8:00pm

Sheet 2	1	2	3	4	5	6	7	8	9	10	Final
(Alaska) Susan Carothers	1	0	0	0	0	X	X	X	X	X	1
(Washington (state)) Sheila Mariano 🔨	0	5	2	1	3	X	X	X	X	X	11

Sheet 3	1	2	3	4	5	6	7	8	9	10	Final
(Arizona) Debra Aubry 🔨	1	3	0	2	4	X	X	X	X	X	10
(Massachusetts) Margaret Lawler	0	0	2	0	0	X	X	X	X	X	2

==== Draw 10 ====
Thursday, March 9, 8:00am

Sheet 1	1	2	3	4	5	6	7	8	9	10	Final
(Oregon) Lisa Tamura	3	0	0	0	0	1	X	X	X	X	4
(Wisconsin) Susan Dukes 🔨	0	3	1	1	2	0	X	X	X	X	7

Sheet 5	1	2	3	4	5	6	7	8	9	10	Final
(Washington (state)) Cyndie Sweet 🔨	1	1	0	0	3	0	0	1	X	X	6
(Montana) Cynthia Smith	0	0	1	2	0	1	4	0	X	X	8

==== Draw 11 ====
Thursday, March 9, 2:00pm

No women's matches took place during Draw 11.

==== Draw 12 ====
Thursday, March 9, 7:00pm

Sheet 1	1	2	3	4	5	6	7	8	9	10	Final
(Washington (state)) Sheila Mariano 🔨	1	0	0	2	1	2	2	X	X	X	8
(Arizona) Debra Aubry	0	2	2	0	0	0	0	X	X	X	4

Sheet 2	1	2	3	4	5	6	7	8	9	10	Final
(Minnesota) Kimberly Wapola 🔨	1	0	2	1	0	2	0	X	X	X	6
(Wisconsin) Susan Dukes	0	5	0	0	5	0	3	X	X	X	12

==== Draw 13 ====
Friday, March 10, 9:00am

Sheet 3	1	2	3	4	5	6	7	8	9	10	Final
(Wisconsin) Susan Dukes	0	5	1	0	1	3	X	X	X	X	10
(Washington (state)) Cyndie Sweet 🔨	2	0	0	1	0	0	X	X	X	X	3

Sheet 4	1	2	3	4	5	6	7	8	9	10	Final
(Minnesota) Kimberly Wapola	0	0	1	0	0	1	X	X	X	X	2
(Wisconsin) Tracy Lawless 🔨	2	4	0	3	0	0	X	X	X	X	9

=== Playoffs ===
Saturday, March 10 - 10:00am
1	(Minnesota) Margie Smith 🔨	6
4	(Wisconsin) Susan Dukes	5
2	(Wisconsin) Tracy Lawless 🔨	8
3	(Washington (state)) Sheila Mariano	7

Saturday, March 10 - 3:00pm
(Minnesota) Margie Smith	5
(Wisconsin) Tracy Lawless 🔨	4
Third place
(Wisconsin) Susan Dukes	9
(Washington (state)) Sheila Mariano 🔨	4

==== Semifinals ====
Saturday, March 11, 10:00am

===== 1 v. 4 =====
Sheet 3	1	2	3	4	5	6	7	8	9	10	Final
(Minnesota) Margie Smith 🔨	1	2	1	0	1	1	X	X	X	X	6
(Wisconsin) Susan Dukes	0	0	0	3	0	0	1	1	X	X	5

===== 2 v. 3 =====
Sheet 5	1	2	3	4	5	6	7	8	9	10	Final
(Wisconsin) Tracy Lawless 🔨	1	0	0	1	0	3	0	2	1	X	8
(Washington (state)) Sheila Mariano	0	1	2	0	3	0	1	0	0	X	7

==== Bronze Match ====
Saturday, March 11, 3:00pm

Sheet 2	1	2	3	4	5	6	7	8	9	10	Final
(Wisconsin) Susan Dukes	0	2	1	0	0	5	1	X	X	X	9
(Washington (state)) Sheila Mariano 🔨	1	0	0	2	1	0	0	X	X	X	4

==== Finals ====
Saturday, March 11, 3:00pm

Sheet 4	1	2	3	4	5	6	7	8	9	10	Final
(Minnesota) Margie Smith	1	0	2	0	0	1	0	1	X	X	5
(Wisconsin) Tracy Lawless 🔨	0	1	0	0	1	0	2	0	X	X	4

2023 United States Senior Women's Curling Champion
(Minnesota)
Margie Smith
8th United States Senior Women's Curling Championship title
