= 2011 Seattle Cash Spiel =

World Curling Tour event

- Host city: Seattle, Washington
- Arena: Granite Curling Club
- Dates: November 25–27
- Winner: (British Columbia) Jay Wakefield
- Skip: Jay Wakefield
- Fourth: Michael Johnson
- Third: Chris Baier
- Lead: John Cullen
- Finalist: (British Columbia) Jody Epp

The 2011 Seattle Cash Spiel was held from November 25 to 27 at the Granite Curling Club in Seattle, Washington as part of the 2011–12 World Curling Tour. The purse for the event was USD10,600. The event was held in a triple knockout format. Though the Cash Spiel is a men's event, one women's team, skipped by Cristin Clark, participated.

== Teams ==
Skip	Third	Second	Lead	Locale
Sean Beighton	Andrew Ernst	Sam Galey	Mac Guy	(Washington (state)) Seattle, Washington
Andrew Bilesky	Stephen Kopf	Derek Errington	Aaron Watson	New Westminster, British Columbia
Cristin Clark	Emily Good	Elle LeBeau	Sharon Vukich	(Washington (state)) Seattle, Washington
Wes Craig	Greg Hawkes	William Sutton	Stu Merrifield	Victoria, British Columbia
Jody Epp	Blair Cusack	James Yorke	Brad Kocurek	Victoria, British Columbia
Lyle Sieg (fourth)	Jeff Tomlinson	Doug Schaak	Benj Guzman (skip)	(Washington (state)) Seattle, Washington
Wayne Harris	Richard Tanguay	Alan de Jersey	Rick Thomson	Comox Valley, British Columbia
Colin Hufman	Joel Larway	Steve Birklid	Kevin Johnson	(Washington (state)) Seattle, Washington
Wes Johnson	Brady Clark	Darren Lehto	Steve Lundeen	(Washington (state)) Seattle, Washington
Doug Kauffman	Greg Romaniuk	Ken Trask	Brad Kasper	(Washington (state)) Seattle, Washington
James Knievel (fourth)	John Kowalchuk	Brett Knievel	Bob Knievel (skip)	(Washington (state)) Seattle, Washington
Dave Manser	Bob Coleman	Todd McCann	Mike Mulroy	Lethbridge, Alberta
Dean Joanisse (fourth)	Tyler Klitch	Bryan Miki (skip)	Jay Batch	New Westminster, British Columbia
Zach Radmer	Jon Chartrand	Rich Burmeister	Glenn Allan	(Washington (state)) Seattle, Washington
Tom Violette	Leon Romaniuk	Paul Lyttle		(Washington (state)) Seattle, Washington
Michael Johnson (fourth)	Chris Baier	Jay Wakefield (skip)	John Cullen	New Westminster, British Columbia

== Results ==
=== A Event ===
First Knockout		Semifinals		Qualifier 1
(British Columbia) Bryan Miki	7
(Washington (state)) Zach Radmer	8	(Washington (state)) Zach Radmer	7
(Washington (state)) Sean Beighton	2	(Washington (state)) Colin Hufman	4
(Washington (state)) Colin Hufman	6			(Washington (state)) Zach Radmer	5
(British Columbia) Jody Epp	3			(Washington (state)) Bob Knievel	4
(Washington (state)) Bob Knievel	8	(Washington (state)) Bob Knievel	8
(Washington (state)) Wes Johnson	5	(Washington (state)) Benj Guzman	4
(Washington (state)) Benj Guzman	8

First Knockout		Semifinals		Qualifier 2
(British Columbia) Andrew Bilesky	7
(Washington (state)) Cristin Clark	3	(British Columbia) Andrew Bilesky	2
(Alberta) Dave Manser	5	(Washington (state)) Tom Violette	6
(Washington (state)) Tom Violette	6			(Washington (state)) Tom Violette	3
(British Columbia) Wes Craig	8			(British Columbia) Jay Wakefield	6
(Washington (state)) Doug Kauffman	6	(British Columbia) Wes Craig	1
(British Columbia) Jay Wakefield	7	(British Columbia) Jay Wakefield	7
(British Columbia) Wayne Harris	3

=== B Event ===
Second Knockout		Semifinals		Qualifier 3
(British Columbia) Bryan Miki	4
(Washington (state)) Sean Beighton	5	(Washington (state)) Sean Beighton	6
(British Columbia) Jody Epp	7	(British Columbia) Jody Epp	8
(Washington (state)) Wes Johnson	6			(British Columbia) Jody Epp	3
				(Washington (state)) Tom Violette	6

Second Knockout		Semifinals		Qualifier 4
(Washington (state)) Cristin Clark	7
(Alberta) Dave Manser	1	(Washington (state)) Cristin Clark	5
(Washington (state)) Doug Kauffman	7	(Washington (state)) Doug Kauffman	9
(British Columbia) Wayne Harris	6			(Washington (state)) Doug Kauffman	8
				(Washington (state)) Bob Knievel	3

Second Knockout		Qualifier 5
(Washington (state)) Colin Hufman	9
(Washington (state)) Benj Guzman	2	(Washington (state)) Colin Hufman	5
(British Columbia) Andrew Bilesky	6	(British Columbia) Andrew Bilesky	2
(British Columbia) Wes Craig	5

=== C Event ===
Third Knockout		Semifinals		Qualifier 6
(British Columbia) Bryan Miki	3
(Washington (state)) Wes Johnson	4	(Washington (state)) Wes Johnson	8
		(British Columbia) Wes Craig	6
				(Washington (state)) Wes Johnson	7
				(Washington (state)) Bob Knievel	4

Third Knockout		Semifinals		Qualifier 7
(Alberta) Dave Manser	6
(British Columbia) Wayne Harris	3	(Alberta) Dave Manser	9
		(Washington (state)) Benj Guzman	4
				(Alberta) Dave Manser	8
				(British Columbia) Jody Epp	9

Third Knockout		Qualifier 8
(Washington (state)) Sean Beighton	7
(Washington (state)) Cristin Clark	3	(Washington (state)) Sean Beighton	5
		(British Columbia) Andrew Bilesky	2

== Playoffs ==
Quarterfinals
(Washington (state)) Zach Radmer	5
(British Columbia) Jody Epp	6
(Washington (state)) Tom Violette	2
(Washington (state)) Sean Beighton	6
(Washington (state)) Doug Kauffman	8
(Washington (state)) Colin Hufman	6
(British Columbia) Jay Wakefield	6
(Washington (state)) Wes Johnson	0

Semifinals
(British Columbia) Jody Epp	5
(Washington (state)) Sean Beighton	3
(Washington (state)) Doug Kauffman	7
(British Columbia) Jay Wakefield	8

Final
(British Columbia) Jody Epp	2
(British Columbia) Jay Wakefield	7
