= 2012 Seattle Cash Spiel =

World Curling Tour event

- Host city: Seattle, Washington
- Arena: Granite Curling Club
- Dates: November 23–25
- Winner: (Minnesota) Todd Birr
- Skip: Todd Birr
- Third: Doug Pottinger
- Second: Tom O'Connor
- Lead: Kevin Birr
- Finalist: (Washington (state)) Brady Clark

The 2012 Seattle Cash Spiel was held from November 23 to 25 at the Granite Curling Club in Seattle, Washington as part of the 2012–13 World Curling Tour. The event was held in a triple knockout, and the purse for the event was $10,000, of which the winner will receive $2,600. In the final, Todd Birr of Minnesota defeated Brady Clark of Washington with a score of 7–4.

== Teams ==
The teams are listed as follows. Though the event is listed on the men's World Curling Tour, one mixed team and one women's team are participating in the event.

Skip	Third	Second	Lead	Locale
Todd Birr	Doug Pottinger	Tom O'Connor	Kevin Birr	Mankato, Minnesota
Mike Calcagno	Cristin Clark	Andrew Ernst	Christina Pastula	(Washington (state)) Seattle, Washington
Brady Clark	Sean Beighton	Darren Lehto	Steve Lundeen	(Washington (state)) Seattle, Washington
Wes Craig	Kevin Britt	Tony Anslow		Victoria, British Columbia
Jody Epp	Blair Cusack	Brad Kocurek	James York	Victoria, British Columbia
Ryan Flippo	Quinn Evenson	Oliver Halvarson	Brandon Hall	Fairbanks, Alaska
Eugene Hritzuk	Ig Baranieski	Verne Anderson	Dave Folk	Saskatoon, Saskatchewan
Mark Johnson	Jason Larway	Joel Larway	Christopher Rimple	(Washington (state)) Seattle, Washington
Michael Johnson (fourth)	Paul Cseke	Jay Wakefield (skip)	John Cullen	New Westminster, British Columbia
Dave Manser	Jeremie Crone	Todd McCann	Mike Mulroy	Lethbridge, Alberta
Jason Montgomery	Miles Craig	William Duggan	Josh Hozack	Duncan, British Columbia
Lyle Sieg	Ken Trask	Benj Guzman	Duane Rutan	(Washington (state)) Seattle, Washington
Shelby Sweet	Cori Tomlinson	Nikki Lorvick	Summer Barnes	(Washington (state)) Seattle, Washington
Jay Tuson	Colin Mantik	Glen Jackson	Ken Tucker	Victoria, British Columbia
Jake Vukich	Evan MacAuley	Luc Violette	Blake Sweet	(Washington (state)) Seattle, Washington
Greg Hawkes (fourth)	Mike Wood (skip)	Sean Cromarty	Paul Awalt	Victoria, British Columbia

== Knockout results ==
The draw is listed as follows:

=== A event ===
First Knockout		Semifinals		Qualifier 1
(Minnesota) Todd Birr	9
(Washington (state)) Mike Calcagno	5	(Minnesota) Todd Birr	6
(Washington (state)) Mark Johnson	7	(Washington (state)) Mark Johnson	5
(Saskatchewan) Eugene Hritzuk	6			(Minnesota) Todd Birr	2
(British Columbia) Jason Montgomery	10			(British Columbia) Jody Epp	9
(Washington (state)) Shelby Sweet	2	(British Columbia) Jason Montgomery	3
(British Columbia) Jody Epp	7	(British Columbia) Jody Epp	5
(Alaska) Ryan Flippo	0

First Knockout		Semifinals		Qualifier 2
(British Columbia) Jay Wakefield	7
(Washington (state)) Jake Vukich	1	(British Columbia) Jay Wakefield	5
(British Columbia) Jay Tuson	6	(British Columbia) Jay Tuson	3
(British Columbia) Wes Craig	4			(British Columbia) Jay Wakefield	7
(Washington (state)) Brady Clark	4			(Washington (state)) Brady Clark	2
(Washington (state)) Lyle Sieg	2	(Washington (state)) Brady Clark	5
(British Columbia) Mike Wood	5	(British Columbia) Mike Wood	4
(Alberta) Dave Manser	1

=== B event ===
Second Knockout		Semifinals		Qualifier 3
(Washington (state)) Mike Calcagno	4
(Saskatchewan) Eugene Hritzuk	8	(Saskatchewan) Eugene Hritzuk	7
(Washington (state)) Shelby Sweet	5	(Alaska) Ryan Flippo	2
(Alaska) Ryan Flippo	6			(Saskatchewan) Eugene Hritzuk	6
				(Washington (state)) Brady Clark	5

Second Knockout		Semifinals		Qualifier 4
(Washington (state)) Jake Vukich	3
(British Columbia) Wes Craig	7	(British Columbia) Wes Craig	6
(Washington (state)) Lyle Sieg	2	(Alberta) Dave Manser	3
(Alberta) Dave Manser	8			(British Columbia) Wes Craig	0
				(Minnesota) Todd Birr	6

Second Knockout		Qualifier 5
(Washington (state)) Mark Johnson	1
(British Columbia) Jason Montgomery	7	(British Columbia) Jason Montgomery	6
(British Columbia) Jay Tuson	5	(British Columbia) Jay Tuson	3
(British Columbia) Mike Wood	4

=== C event ===
Third Knockout		Qualifier 6		Final
(Washington (state)) Mike Calcagno	10
(Washington (state)) Shelby Sweet	5	(Washington (state)) Mike Calcagno	5
		(British Columbia) Mike Wood	'6
				(British Columbia) Mike Wood	6
				(British Columbia) Wes Craig	2

Third Knockout		Qualifier 7		Final
(Washington (state)) Jake Vukich	3
(Washington (state)) Lyle Sieg	6	(Washington (state)) Lyle Sieg	9
		(Washington (state)) Mark Johnson	2
				(Washington (state)) Lyle Sieg	5
				(Washington (state)) Brady Clark	8

Third Knockout		Qualifier 8
(Alaska) Ryan Flippo	5
(Alberta) Dave Manser	8	(Alberta) Dave Manser	1
		(British Columbia) Jay Tuson	7

== Playoffs ==
The playoffs draw is listed as follows:

Quarterfinals
(British Columbia) Jody Epp	2
(Washington (state)) Brady Clark	6
(Saskatchewan) Eugene Hritzuk	7
(British Columbia) Jay Tuson	4
(Minnesota) Todd Birr	5
(British Columbia) Jason Montgomery	2
(British Columbia) Jay Wakefield	4
(British Columbia) Mike Wood	6

Semifinals
(Washington (state)) Brady Clark	7
(Saskatchewan) Eugene Hritzuk	2
(Minnesota) Todd Birr	8
(British Columbia) Mike Wood	2

Final
(Washington (state)) Brady Clark	4
(Minnesota) Todd Birr	7
