= Seattle Cash Spiel =

Former World Curling Tour event

The Seattle Cash Spiel was an annual bonspiel, or curling tournament, that took place in late November at the Granite Curling Club in Seattle, Washington. The tournament was held in a triple knockout format. The tournament was part of the World Curling Tour.

== Past champions ==
Only skip's name is displayed.

Year	Winning team	Runner up team	Purse (USD)
1995	(British Columbia) Bob McIntosh		
1998	(British Columbia) Ian Cordner		
1999	(British Columbia) Chad Dezura		
2003	(United States) Ryan Yalowicki		
2004	(Washington (state)) Wes Johnson		
2005	(British Columbia) Greg McAulay		
2006	(Washington (state)) Jason Larway		
2007	(Alberta) Dan Petryk		
2008	(Washington (state)) Mark Johnson	(British Columbia) Ken Watson	
2009			
2010	(Alberta) Brad Hannah	(Washington (state)) Leon Romaniuk	$13,500
2011	(British Columbia) Jay Wakefield	(British Columbia) Jody Epp	$10,600
2012	(Minnesota) Todd Birr	(Washington (state)) Brady Clark	$10,000
2013	(Washington (state)) Brady Clark	(British Columbia) Jeff Richards	$10,000
