= 2024 United States Senior Curling Championships =

Curling Senior Championship

- Host city: Mapleton, Minnesota (Men's Event); Anderson, Indiana (Women's Event)
- Arena: Mapleton CC (Men's Event); Circle City CC (Women's Event)
- Dates: February 6–11, 2024 (Men's Event); February 19–24, 2024 (Women's Event)
- Men's winner: (Minnesota) Mike Farbelow
- Curling club: St. Paul CC
- Skip: Mike Farbelow
- Third: Rich Ruohonen
- Second: Bill Stopera
- Lead: Tim Solin
- Finalist: (Arizona) Bob Leclair

The 2024 United States Senior Curling Championships was held February 6–11, 2024, for the men's event and will be held February 19–25, 2024 for the women's event. The men's event was held at Heather Curling Club in Mapleton, MN. In the men's event final, Team Mike Farbelow defeated Team Bob Leclair 7-4:. The women's event will be held at Circle City Curling Club in Anderson, IN. The champions from the men's and women's events will go on to represent the United States at the 2024 World Senior Curling Championships in Östersund, Sweden.

== Men's Event ==
=== Teams ===
The men's teams are listed as follows:

| Skip | Third | Second | Lead | Alternate | Locale |
|---|---|---|---|---|---|
| Matt Aro | Mark Hartman | Jim Osborne | Chris Laabs | Jay Clark | Madison, Wisconsin |
| Kent Arrell | Steve Russel | Chris Dibble | Duane Herbert | | Rochester, Minnesota |
| Mike Farbelow | Rich Ruohonen | Bill Stopera | Tim Solin | | St Paul, Minnesota |
| Bob Hedstrom | Steve Cerkvenik | Ken Olson | Nate Olson | | St Paul, Minnesota |
| Chris Hester | David DeBois | Jeff Wick | Phil Shyrock | | (Washington (state)) Seattle, Washington |
| Timothy Ho | Benj Guzman | Mike Sampson | Paul Marseglia | | Wayland, Massachusetts |
| Murray Jackson | Kim Hicks | Brian Chick | Mario Riveron | | Raleigh, North Carolina |
| Bob LeClair | Fred Maxie | Jeff Baird | Tom Danielson | | Tempe, Arizona |
| Paul Pustovar | Ross Litman | Dan Wiza | Mike Kniffin | | Hibbing, Minnesota |
| Jon Schiestel | Keith Mischo | Al Boldt | Alan Batchen | | Greeley, Colorado |
| Kenneth Starkey | Randy Cumming | Bob Tessman | Jeff Kennedy | | Chaska, Minnesota |
| Mark Tolvstad | Bryan Rau | Kirby Baumgard | Mark Becking | | Sioux Falls, South Dakota |
| Greg Torkelson | Staffan Axelsson | Jeff Elborne | Scott Gerstenkorn | | Chicago, Illinois |
| Alex Tschumakow | Scott McLeod | Dick Dawson | Keith Dropkin | Timothy Luehrman | Wayland, Massachusetts |
| Todd Ussatis | Owen Sampson | Tom Munich | John Lambert | | Bismarck, North Dakota |
| Jeff Wright | Steve Waters | Sean Silver | Russ Armstrong | | Chicago, Illinois |

=== Round-Robin Standings ===
Key
| Teams to playoffs |

Pool A
| Skip | W | L |
|---|---|---|
| (Minnesota) Mike Farbelow | 7 | 0 |
| (Massachusetts) Timothy Ho | 5 | 2 |
| (Minnesota) Kenneth Starkey | 5 | 2 |
| (Wisconsin) Matt Aro | 4 | 3 |
| (Illinois) Jeff Wright | 4 | 3 |
| (North Dakota) Todd Ussatis | 2 | 5 |
| (Minnesota) Kent Arrell | 1 | 6 |
| (Colorado) Jon Schiestel | 0 | 7 |

Pool B
| Skip | W | L |
|---|---|---|
| (North Carolina) Murray Jackson | 6 | 1 |
| (Minnesota) Paul Pustovar | 6 | 1 |
| (Arizona) Bob Leclair | 5 | 2 |
| (Minnesota) Bob Hedstrom | 4 | 3 |
| (Illinois) Greg Torkelson | 4 | 3 |
| (Washington (state)) Chris Hester | 2 | 5 |
| (Massachusetts) Alex Tschumakow | 1 | 6 |
| (South Dakota) Mark Tolvstad | 0 | 7 |

=== Round-Robin Results ===
All draw times are listed in Central Standard Time (UTC−06:00). The first team listed for each match threw the red stones.

==== Draw 1 ====
Wednesday, February 7, 4:00pm

| Sheet 1 | 1 | 2 | 3 | 4 | 5 | 6 | 7 | 8 | 9 | 10 | 11 | Final |
|---|---|---|---|---|---|---|---|---|---|---|---|---|
| (Illinois) Jeff Wright | 0 | 2 | 2 | 0 | 3 | 0 | 3 | X | X | X | X | 10 |
| (Minnesota) Kent Arrell 🔨 | 1 | 0 | 0 | 1 | 0 | 1 | 0 | X | X | X | X | 3 |

| Sheet 2 | 1 | 2 | 3 | 4 | 5 | 6 | 7 | 8 | 9 | 10 | 11 | Final |
|---|---|---|---|---|---|---|---|---|---|---|---|---|
| (Massachusetts) Timothy Ho | 2 | 0 | 0 | 1 | 0 | 2 | 2 | 0 | X | X | X | 7 |
| (Colorado) Jon Schiestel 🔨 | 0 | 0 | 1 | 0 | 3 | 0 | 0 | 0 | X | X | X | 4 |

| Sheet 3 | 1 | 2 | 3 | 4 | 5 | 6 | 7 | 8 | 9 | 10 | 11 | Final |
|---|---|---|---|---|---|---|---|---|---|---|---|---|
| (North Dakota) Todd Ussatis | 2 | 0 | 0 | 0 | 0 | 1 | 1 | 0 | X | X | X | 4 |
| (Wisconsin) Matt Aro 🔨 | 0 | 1 | 1 | 1 | 1 | 0 | 0 | 1 | X | X | X | 5 |

| Sheet 4 | 1 | 2 | 3 | 4 | 5 | 6 | 7 | 8 | 9 | 10 | 11 | Final |
|---|---|---|---|---|---|---|---|---|---|---|---|---|
| (Minnesota) Mike Farbelow 🔨 | 0 | 2 | 1 | 1 | 0 | 1 | 0 | 2 | X | X | X | 7 |
| (Minnesota) Kenneth Starkey | 1 | 0 | 0 | 0 | 1 | 0 | 1 | 0 | X | X | X | 3 |

==== Draw 2 ====
Wednesday, February 7, 8:00pm

| Sheet 1 | 1 | 2 | 3 | 4 | 5 | 6 | 7 | 8 | 9 | 10 | 11 | Final |
|---|---|---|---|---|---|---|---|---|---|---|---|---|
| (Arizona) Bob Leclair | 3 | 0 | 0 | 0 | 1 | 1 | 1 | X | X | X | X | 6 |
| (Washington (state)) Chris Hester 🔨 | 0 | 2 | 1 | 1 | 0 | 0 | 0 | X | X | X | X | 4 |

| Sheet 2 | 1 | 2 | 3 | 4 | 5 | 6 | 7 | 8 | 9 | 10 | 11 | Final |
|---|---|---|---|---|---|---|---|---|---|---|---|---|
| (North Carolina) Murray Jackson 🔨 | 1 | 0 | 2 | 0 | 2 | 1 | 0 | X | X | X | X | 6 |
| (South Dakota) Mark Tolvstad | 0 | 1 | 0 | 1 | 0 | 0 | 1 | X | X | X | X | 3 |

| Sheet 3 | 1 | 2 | 3 | 4 | 5 | 6 | 7 | 8 | 9 | 10 | 11 | Final |
|---|---|---|---|---|---|---|---|---|---|---|---|---|
| (Massachusetts) Alex Tschumakow 🔨 | 0 | 0 | 1 | 2 | 0 | 1 | 0 | X | X | X | X | 4 |
| (Illinois) Greg Torkelson | 1 | 1 | 0 | 0 | 2 | 0 | 3 | X | X | X | X | 7 |

| Sheet 4 | 1 | 2 | 3 | 4 | 5 | 6 | 7 | 8 | 9 | 10 | 11 | Final |
|---|---|---|---|---|---|---|---|---|---|---|---|---|
| (Minnesota) Paul Pustovar | 0 | 1 | 0 | 2 | 0 | 1 | 1 | X | X | X | X | 5 |
| (Minnesota) Bob Hedstrom 🔨 | 2 | 0 | 1 | 0 | 1 | 0 | 0 | X | X | X | X | 4 |

==== Draw 3 ====
Thursday, February 8, 8:00am

| Sheet 1 | 1 | 2 | 3 | 4 | 5 | 6 | 7 | 8 | 9 | 10 | 11 | Final |
|---|---|---|---|---|---|---|---|---|---|---|---|---|
| (Wisconsin) Matt Aro | 0 | 0 | 1 | 0 | 1 | 1 | 4 | X | X | X | X | 7 |
| (Colorado) Jon Schiestel 🔨 | 1 | 1 | 0 | 3 | 0 | 0 | 0 | X | X | X | X | 5 |

| Sheet 2 | 1 | 2 | 3 | 4 | 5 | 6 | 7 | 8 | 9 | 10 | 11 | Final |
|---|---|---|---|---|---|---|---|---|---|---|---|---|
| (Minnesota) Kent Arrell 🔨 | 3 | 0 | 0 | 2 | 0 | 0 | 0 | X | X | X | X | 5 |
| (Minnesota) Kenneth Starkey | 0 | 2 | 2 | 0 | 1 | 2 | 1 | X | X | X | X | 8 |

| Sheet 3 | 1 | 2 | 3 | 4 | 5 | 6 | 7 | 8 | 9 | 10 | 11 | Final |
|---|---|---|---|---|---|---|---|---|---|---|---|---|
| (Illinois) Jeff Wright 🔨 | 0 | 1 | 0 | 0 | 0 | X | X | X | X | X | X | 1 |
| (Minnesota) Mike Farbelow | 2 | 0 | 2 | 0 | 4 | X | X | X | X | X | X | 8 |

| Sheet 4 | 1 | 2 | 3 | 4 | 5 | 6 | 7 | 8 | 9 | 10 | 11 | Final |
|---|---|---|---|---|---|---|---|---|---|---|---|---|
| (Massachusetts) Timothy Ho 🔨 | 2 | 0 | 4 | 1 | 0 | 4 | X | X | X | X | X | 11 |
| (North Dakota) Todd Ussatis | 0 | 1 | 0 | 0 | 1 | 0 | X | X | X | X | X | 2 |

==== Draw 4 ====
Thursday, February 8, 12:00pm

| Sheet 1 | 1 | 2 | 3 | 4 | 5 | 6 | 7 | 8 | 9 | 10 | 11 | Final |
|---|---|---|---|---|---|---|---|---|---|---|---|---|
| (Illinois) Greg Torkelson | 2 | 0 | 3 | 2 | 2 | X | X | X | X | X | X | 9 |
| (South Dakota) Mark Tolvstad 🔨 | 0 | 1 | 0 | 0 | 0 | X | X | X | X | X | X | 1 |

| Sheet 2 | 1 | 2 | 3 | 4 | 5 | 6 | 7 | 8 | 9 | 10 | 11 | Final |
|---|---|---|---|---|---|---|---|---|---|---|---|---|
| (Washington (state)) Chris Hester 🔨 | 0 | 2 | 1 | 0 | 0 | 0 | 2 | 0 | X | X | X | 5 |
| (Minnesota) Bob Hedstrom | 2 | 0 | 0 | 1 | 2 | 0 | 0 | 2 | X | X | X | 7 |

| Sheet 3 | 1 | 2 | 3 | 4 | 5 | 6 | 7 | 8 | 9 | 10 | 11 | Final |
|---|---|---|---|---|---|---|---|---|---|---|---|---|
| (Arizona) Bob Leclair 🔨 | 0 | 0 | 0 | 0 | 1 | 0 | 1 | 2 | X | X | X | 4 |
| (Minnesota) Paul Pustovar | 1 | 2 | 0 | 1 | 0 | 1 | 0 | 0 | X | X | X | 5 |

| Sheet 2 | 1 | 2 | 3 | 4 | 5 | 6 | 7 | 8 | 9 | 10 | 11 | Final |
|---|---|---|---|---|---|---|---|---|---|---|---|---|
| (North Carolina) Murray Jackson 🔨 | 1 | 0 | 2 | 0 | 2 | 1 | 0 | X | X | X | X | 6 |
| (South Dakota) Mark Tolvstad | 0 | 1 | 0 | 1 | 0 | 0 | 1 | X | X | X | X | 3 |

==== Draw 5 ====
Thursday, February 8, 4:00pm

| Sheet 1 | 1 | 2 | 3 | 4 | 5 | 6 | 7 | 8 | 9 | 10 | 11 | Final |
|---|---|---|---|---|---|---|---|---|---|---|---|---|
| (North Dakota) Todd Ussatis 🔨 | 0 | 3 | 0 | 0 | 0 | 1 | X | X | X | X | X | 4 |
| (Illinois) Jeff Wright | 2 | 0 | 3 | 2 | 1 | 0 | X | X | X | X | X | 8 |

| Sheet 2 | 1 | 2 | 3 | 4 | 5 | 6 | 7 | 8 | 9 | 10 | 11 | Final |
|---|---|---|---|---|---|---|---|---|---|---|---|---|
| (Colorado) Jon Schiestel | 0 | 0 | 1 | 0 | X | X | X | X | X | X | X | 1 |
| (Minnesota) Mike Farbelow 🔨 | 3 | 3 | 0 | 4 | X | X | X | X | X | X | X | 10 |

| Sheet 3 | 1 | 2 | 3 | 4 | 5 | 6 | 7 | 8 | 9 | 10 | 11 | Final |
|---|---|---|---|---|---|---|---|---|---|---|---|---|
| (Massachusetts) Timothy Ho 🔨 | 1 | 2 | 1 | 0 | 3 | X | X | X | X | X | X | 7 |
| (Minnesota) Kenneth Starkey | 0 | 0 | 0 | 1 | 0 | X | X | X | X | X | X | 1 |

| Sheet 4 | 1 | 2 | 3 | 4 | 5 | 6 | 7 | 8 | 9 | 10 | 11 | Final |
|---|---|---|---|---|---|---|---|---|---|---|---|---|
| (Minnesota) Kent Arrell | 1 | 0 | 0 | 0 | 0 | 0 | 2 | 1 | X | X | X | 4 |
| (Wisconsin) Matt Aro 🔨 | 0 | 1 | 1 | 1 | 1 | 2 | 0 | 0 | X | X | X | 6 |

==== Draw 6 ====
Thursday, February 8, 8:00pm

| Sheet 1 | 1 | 2 | 3 | 4 | 5 | 6 | 7 | 8 | 9 | 10 | 11 | Final |
|---|---|---|---|---|---|---|---|---|---|---|---|---|
| (Massachusetts) Alex Tschumakow 🔨 | 0 | 1 | 2 | 0 | 2 | 0 | 2 | 0 | 0 | X | X | 7 |
| (Arizona) Bob Leclair | 1 | 0 | 0 | 4 | 0 | 1 | 0 | 1 | 1 | X | X | 8 |

| Sheet 2 | 1 | 2 | 3 | 4 | 5 | 6 | 7 | 8 | 9 | 10 | 11 | Final |
|---|---|---|---|---|---|---|---|---|---|---|---|---|
| (South Dakota) Mark Tolvstad 🔨 | 0 | 0 | 2 | 0 | X | X | X | X | X | X | X | 2 |
| (Minnesota) Paul Pustovar | 0 | 4 | 0 | 3 | X | X | X | X | X | X | X | 7 |

| Sheet 3 | 1 | 2 | 3 | 4 | 5 | 6 | 7 | 8 | 9 | 10 | 11 | Final |
|---|---|---|---|---|---|---|---|---|---|---|---|---|
| (North Carolina) Murray Jackson | 0 | 2 | 0 | 1 | 0 | 3 | 1 | X | X | X | X | 7 |
| (Minnesota) Bob Hedstrom 🔨 | 1 | 0 | 1 | 0 | 1 | 0 | 0 | X | X | X | X | 3 |

| Sheet 4 | 1 | 2 | 3 | 4 | 5 | 6 | 7 | 8 | 9 | 10 | 11 | Final |
|---|---|---|---|---|---|---|---|---|---|---|---|---|
| (Washington (state)) Chris Hester 🔨 | 1 | 0 | 2 | 0 | 0 | 0 | X | X | X | X | X | 3 |
| (Illinois) Greg Torkelson | 0 | 2 | 0 | 2 | 4 | 1 | X | X | X | X | X | 9 |

==== Draw 7 ====
Friday, February 9, 8:00am

| Sheet 1 | 1 | 2 | 3 | 4 | 5 | 6 | 7 | 8 | 9 | 10 | 11 | Final |
|---|---|---|---|---|---|---|---|---|---|---|---|---|
| (Massachusetts) Timothy Ho 🔨 | 0 | 0 | 2 | 0 | X | X | X | X | X | X | X | 2 |
| (Minnesota) Mike Farbelow | 3 | 1 | 0 | 4 | X | X | X | X | X | X | X | 8 |

| Sheet 2 | 1 | 2 | 3 | 4 | 5 | 6 | 7 | 8 | 9 | 10 | 11 | Final |
|---|---|---|---|---|---|---|---|---|---|---|---|---|
| (North Dakota) Todd Ussatis 🔨 | 0 | 5 | 1 | 1 | 0 | 4 | X | X | X | X | X | 11 |
| (Minnesota) Kent Arrell | 2 | 0 | 0 | 0 | 2 | 0 | X | X | X | X | X | 4 |

| Sheet 3 | 1 | 2 | 3 | 4 | 5 | 6 | 7 | 8 | 9 | 10 | 11 | Final |
|---|---|---|---|---|---|---|---|---|---|---|---|---|
| (Wisconsin) Matt Aro | 0 | 1 | 3 | 1 | 1 | 1 | X | X | X | X | X | 7 |
| (Illinois) Jeff Wright 🔨 | 1 | 0 | 0 | 0 | 0 | 0 | X | X | X | X | X | 1 |

| Sheet 4 | 1 | 2 | 3 | 4 | 5 | 6 | 7 | 8 | 9 | 10 | 11 | Final |
|---|---|---|---|---|---|---|---|---|---|---|---|---|
| (Minnesota) Kenneth Starkey | 1 | 0 | 4 | 1 | 0 | 0 | 1 | 2 | X | X | X | 9 |
| (Colorado) Jon Schiestel 🔨 | 0 | 1 | 0 | 0 | 2 | 2 | 0 | 0 | X | X | X | 5 |

==== Draw 8 ====
Friday, February 9, 12:00pm

| Sheet 1 | 1 | 2 | 3 | 4 | 5 | 6 | 7 | 8 | 9 | 10 | 11 | Final |
|---|---|---|---|---|---|---|---|---|---|---|---|---|
| (North Carolina) Murray Jackson | 1 | 0 | 0 | 2 | 0 | 1 | 0 | 1 | 1 | X | X | 6 |
| (Minnesota) Paul Pustovar 🔨 | 0 | 3 | 0 | 0 | 1 | 0 | 1 | 0 | 0 | X | X | 5 |

| Sheet 2 | 1 | 2 | 3 | 4 | 5 | 6 | 7 | 8 | 9 | 10 | 11 | Final |
|---|---|---|---|---|---|---|---|---|---|---|---|---|
| (Massachusetts) Alex Tschumakow | 1 | 0 | 0 | 0 | 1 | 1 | 0 | X | X | X | X | 3 |
| (Washington (state)) Chris Hester | 0 | 2 | 3 | 1 | 0 | 0 | 2 | X | X | X | X | 8 |

| Sheet 3 | 1 | 2 | 3 | 4 | 5 | 6 | 7 | 8 | 9 | 10 | 11 | Final |
|---|---|---|---|---|---|---|---|---|---|---|---|---|
| (Illinois) Greg Torkelson 🔨 | 0 | 2 | 0 | 1 | 1 | 0 | 0 | X | X | X | X | 4 |
| (Arizona) Bob Leclair | 2 | 0 | 4 | 0 | 0 | 2 | 4 | X | X | X | X | 12 |

| Sheet 4 | 1 | 2 | 3 | 4 | 5 | 6 | 7 | 8 | 9 | 10 | 11 | Final |
|---|---|---|---|---|---|---|---|---|---|---|---|---|
| (Minnesota) Bob Hedstrom 🔨 | 0 | 1 | 0 | 0 | 2 | 0 | 2 | 1 | X | X | X | 6 |
| (South Dakota) Mark Tolvstad | 1 | 0 | 1 | 1 | 0 | 2 | 0 | 0 | X | X | X | 5 |

==== Draw 9 ====
Friday, February 9, 4:00pm

| Sheet 1 | 1 | 2 | 3 | 4 | 5 | 6 | 7 | 8 | 9 | 10 | 11 | Final |
|---|---|---|---|---|---|---|---|---|---|---|---|---|
| (Minnesota) Kenneth Starkey | 1 | 0 | 0 | 4 | 1 | 1 | 0 | X | X | X | X | 7 |
| (Wisconsin) Matt Aro 🔨 | 0 | 1 | 1 | 0 | 0 | 0 | 1 | X | X | X | X | 3 |

| Sheet 2 | 1 | 2 | 3 | 4 | 5 | 6 | 7 | 8 | 9 | 10 | 11 | Final |
|---|---|---|---|---|---|---|---|---|---|---|---|---|
| (Illinois) Jeff Wright 🔨 | 0 | 1 | 1 | 2 | 0 | 0 | 2 | 1 | X | X | X | 7 |
| (Massachusetts) Timothy Ho | 3 | 0 | 0 | 0 | 1 | 1 | 0 | 0 | X | X | X | 5 |

| Sheet 3 | 1 | 2 | 3 | 4 | 5 | 6 | 7 | 8 | 9 | 10 | 11 | Final |
|---|---|---|---|---|---|---|---|---|---|---|---|---|
| (Minnesota) Kent Arrell | 1 | 1 | 0 | 3 | 1 | 1 | 1 | X | X | X | X | 8 |
| (Colorado) Jon Schiestel 🔨 | 0 | 0 | 1 | 0 | 0 | 0 | 0 | X | X | X | X | 1 |

| Sheet 4 | 1 | 2 | 3 | 4 | 5 | 6 | 7 | 8 | 9 | 10 | 11 | Final |
|---|---|---|---|---|---|---|---|---|---|---|---|---|
| (North Dakota) Todd Ussatis 🔨 | 0 | 2 | 0 | 0 | 0 | X | X | X | X | X | X | 2 |
| (Minnesota) Mike Farbelow | 3 | 0 | 2 | 3 | 1 | X | X | X | X | X | X | 9 |

==== Draw 10 ====
Friday, February 9, 8:00pm

| Sheet 1 | 1 | 2 | 3 | 4 | 5 | 6 | 7 | 8 | 9 | 10 | 11 | Final |
|---|---|---|---|---|---|---|---|---|---|---|---|---|
| (Minnesota) Bob Hedstrom | 0 | 0 | 0 | 1 | 1 | 1 | 1 | 1 | X | X | X | 5 |
| (Illinois) Greg Torkelson 🔨 | 0 | 1 | 1 | 0 | 0 | 0 | 0 | 0 | X | X | X | 2 |

| Sheet 2 | 1 | 2 | 3 | 4 | 5 | 6 | 7 | 8 | 9 | 10 | 11 | Final |
|---|---|---|---|---|---|---|---|---|---|---|---|---|
| (Arizona) Bob Leclair | 0 | 2 | 0 | 0 | 0 | 1 | 1 | 0 | 0 | X | X | 4 |
| (North Carolina) Murray Jackson 🔨 | 1 | 0 | 0 | 2 | 0 | 0 | 0 | 1 | 2 | X | X | 6 |

| Sheet 3 | 1 | 2 | 3 | 4 | 5 | 6 | 7 | 8 | 9 | 10 | 11 | Final |
|---|---|---|---|---|---|---|---|---|---|---|---|---|
| (Washington (state)) Chris Hester 🔨 | 1 | 1 | 1 | 0 | 1 | 0 | 0 | 2 | X | X | X | 6 |
| (South Dakota) Mark Tolvstad | 0 | 0 | 0 | 1 | 0 | 1 | 1 | 0 | X | X | X | 3 |

| Sheet 4 | 1 | 2 | 3 | 4 | 5 | 6 | 7 | 8 | 9 | 10 | 11 | Final |
|---|---|---|---|---|---|---|---|---|---|---|---|---|
| (Massachusetts) Alex Tschumakow 🔨 | 0 | 0 | 0 | 0 | X | X | X | X | X | X | X | 0 |
| (Minnesota) Paul Pustovar | 3 | 3 | 1 | 3 | X | X | X | X | X | X | X | 10 |

==== Draw 11 ====
Saturday, February 10, 8:00am

| Sheet 1 | 1 | 2 | 3 | 4 | 5 | 6 | 7 | 8 | 9 | 10 | 11 | Final |
|---|---|---|---|---|---|---|---|---|---|---|---|---|
| (Minnesota) Kent Arrell 🔨 | 1 | 0 | 2 | 0 | 0 | 1 | 0 | 0 | X | X | X | 4 |
| (Massachusetts) Timothy Ho | 0 | 3 | 0 | 1 | 1 | 0 | 2 | 1 | X | X | X | 8 |

| Sheet 2 | 1 | 2 | 3 | 4 | 5 | 6 | 7 | 8 | 9 | 10 | 11 | Final |
|---|---|---|---|---|---|---|---|---|---|---|---|---|
| (Minnesota) Mike Farbelow | 2 | 3 | 1 | 0 | 0 | 1 | 2 | X | X | X | X | 9 |
| (Wisconsin) Matt Aro 🔨 | 0 | 0 | 0 | 2 | 1 | 0 | 0 | X | X | X | X | 3 |

| Sheet 3 | 1 | 2 | 3 | 4 | 5 | 6 | 7 | 8 | 9 | 10 | 11 | Final |
|---|---|---|---|---|---|---|---|---|---|---|---|---|
| (Minnesota) Kenneth Starkey | 0 | 3 | 0 | 2 | 0 | 1 | 2 | X | X | X | X | 8 |
| (North Dakota) Todd Ussatis 🔨 | 2 | 0 | 1 | 0 | 1 | 0 | 0 | X | X | X | X | 4 |

| Sheet 4 | 1 | 2 | 3 | 4 | 5 | 6 | 7 | 8 | 9 | 10 | 11 | Final |
|---|---|---|---|---|---|---|---|---|---|---|---|---|
| (Colorado) Jon Schiestel 🔨 | 0 | 0 | 0 | 0 | 0 | 1 | X | X | X | X | X | 1 |
| (Illinois) Jeff Wright | 2 | 2 | 1 | 1 | 0 | X | X | X | X | X | X | 7 |

==== Draw 12 ====
Saturday, February 10, 12:00pm

| Sheet 1 | 1 | 2 | 3 | 4 | 5 | 6 | 7 | 8 | 9 | 10 | 11 | Final |
|---|---|---|---|---|---|---|---|---|---|---|---|---|
| (Washington (state)) Chris Hester | 1 | 0 | 1 | 0 | 0 | 2 | 0 | 2 | 0 | X | X | 6 |
| (North Carolina) Murray Jackson 🔨 | 0 | 1 | 0 | 2 | 2 | 0 | 1 | 0 | 1 | X | X | 7 |

| Sheet 2 | 1 | 2 | 3 | 4 | 5 | 6 | 7 | 8 | 9 | 10 | 11 | Final |
|---|---|---|---|---|---|---|---|---|---|---|---|---|
| (Minnesota) Paul Pustovar 🔨 | 0 | 1 | 0 | 2 | 0 | 1 | 0 | 3 | X | X | X | 7 |
| (Illinois) Greg Torkelson | 1 | 0 | 2 | 0 | 1 | 0 | 2 | 0 | X | X | X | 6 |

| Sheet 3 | 1 | 2 | 3 | 4 | 5 | 6 | 7 | 8 | 9 | 10 | 11 | Final |
|---|---|---|---|---|---|---|---|---|---|---|---|---|
| (Minnesota) Bob Hedstrom 🔨 | 0 | 3 | 0 | 0 | 2 | 0 | 0 | 2 | X | X | X | 7 |
| (Massachusetts) Alex Tschumakow | 1 | 0 | 1 | 0 | 0 | 1 | 3 | 0 | X | X | X | 6 |

| Sheet 4 | 1 | 2 | 3 | 4 | 5 | 6 | 7 | 8 | 9 | 10 | 11 | Final |
|---|---|---|---|---|---|---|---|---|---|---|---|---|
| (South Dakota) Mark Tolvstad | 1 | 0 | 0 | 0 | 0 | 0 | X | X | X | X | X | 1 |
| (Arizona) Bob Leclair 🔨 | 0 | 1 | 1 | 2 | 1 | 1 | X | X | X | X | X | 6 |

==== Draw 13 ====
Saturday, February 10, 4:00pm

| Sheet 1 | 1 | 2 | 3 | 4 | 5 | 6 | 7 | 8 | 9 | 10 | 11 | Final |
|---|---|---|---|---|---|---|---|---|---|---|---|---|
| (Colorado) Jon Schiestel | 0 | 0 | 1 | 3 | 0 | 1 | 0 | X | X | X | X | 5 |
| (North Dakota) Todd Ussatis 🔨 | 2 | 2 | 0 | 0 | 5 | 0 | 2 | X | X | X | X | 11 |

| Sheet 2 | 1 | 2 | 3 | 4 | 5 | 6 | 7 | 8 | 9 | 10 | 11 | Final |
|---|---|---|---|---|---|---|---|---|---|---|---|---|
| (Minnesota) Kenneth Starkey 🔨 | 0 | 1 | 1 | 1 | 1 | 0 | 0 | 0 | 1 | X | X | 5 |
| (Illinois) Jeff Wright | 1 | 0 | 0 | 0 | 0 | 1 | 1 | 1 | 0 | X | X | 4 |

| Sheet 3 | 1 | 2 | 3 | 4 | 5 | 6 | 7 | 8 | 9 | 10 | 11 | Final |
|---|---|---|---|---|---|---|---|---|---|---|---|---|
| (Minnesota) Mike Farbelow 🔨 | 0 | 0 | 2 | 1 | 0 | 0 | 0 | 1 | X | X | X | 4 |
| (Minnesota) Kent Arrell | 1 | 1 | 0 | 0 | 1 | 0 | 0 | 0 | X | X | X | 3 |

| Sheet 4 | 1 | 2 | 3 | 4 | 5 | 6 | 7 | 8 | 9 | 10 | 11 | Final |
|---|---|---|---|---|---|---|---|---|---|---|---|---|
| (Wisconsin) Matt Aro 🔨 | 0 | 0 | 0 | 0 | 0 | X | X | X | X | X | X | 0 |
| (Massachusetts) Timothy Ho | 1 | 0 | 2 | 1 | 6 | X | X | X | X | X | X | 10 |

==== Draw 14 ====
Saturday, February 10, 8:00pm

| Sheet 1 | 1 | 2 | 3 | 4 | 5 | 6 | 7 | 8 | 9 | 10 | 11 | Final |
|---|---|---|---|---|---|---|---|---|---|---|---|---|
| (South Dakota) Mark Tolvstad | 3 | 0 | 0 | 1 | 0 | 0 | 1 | X | X | X | X | 5 |
| (Massachusetts) Alex Tschumakow 🔨 | 0 | 2 | 1 | 0 | 3 | 1 | 0 | X | X | X | X | 7 |

| Sheet 2 | 1 | 2 | 3 | 4 | 5 | 6 | 7 | 8 | 9 | 10 | 11 | Final |
|---|---|---|---|---|---|---|---|---|---|---|---|---|
| (Minnesota) Bob Hedstrom 🔨 | 2 | 0 | 1 | 0 | 0 | 0 | 1 | X | X | X | X | 4 |
| (Arizona) Bob Leclair | 0 | 1 | 0 | 2 | 1 | 1 | 0 | X | X | X | X | 5 |

| Sheet 3 | 1 | 2 | 3 | 4 | 5 | 6 | 7 | 8 | 9 | 10 | 11 | Final |
|---|---|---|---|---|---|---|---|---|---|---|---|---|
| (Minnesota) Paul Pustovar | 0 | 3 | 1 | 4 | X | X | X | X | X | X | X | 8 |
| (Washington (state)) Chris Hester 🔨 | 1 | 0 | 0 | 0 | X | X | X | X | X | X | X | 1 |

| Sheet 4 | 1 | 2 | 3 | 4 | 5 | 6 | 7 | 8 | 9 | 10 | 11 | Final |
|---|---|---|---|---|---|---|---|---|---|---|---|---|
| (Illinois) Greg Torkelson 🔨 | 1 | 0 | 1 | 0 | 2 | 0 | 1 | X | X | X | X | 5 |
| (North Carolina) Murray Jackson | 0 | 1 | 0 | 1 | 0 | 1 | 0 | X | X | X | X | 3 |

=== Playoffs ===
Sunday, February 11 - 8:00am
4 | (Minnesota) Paul Pustovar 🔨 | 10
5 | (Minnesota) Kenneth Starkey | 5
3 | (Massachusetts) Timothy Ho 🔨 | 7
6 | (Arizona) Bob Leclair | 8

Sunday, February 11–12:00pm
1 | (Minnesota) Mike Farbelow | 9
(Minnesota) Paul Pustovar 🔨 | 3
2 | (North Carolina) Murray Jackson | 3
(Arizona) Bob Leclair 🔨 | 4

Sunday, February 11 - 4:00pm
(Minnesota) Mike Farbelow | 7
(Arizona) Bob Leclair 🔨 | 4
Third place
(Minnesota) Paul Pustovar 🔨 | 7
(North Carolina) Murray Jackson | 6

==== Quarterfinals ====
Sunday, February 11, 8:00am

===== 3 v. 6 =====
| Sheet 2 | 1 | 2 | 3 | 4 | 5 | 6 | 7 | 8 | 9 | 10 | 11 | Final |
|---|---|---|---|---|---|---|---|---|---|---|---|---|
| (Minnesota) Paul Pustovar 🔨 | 0 | 3 | 0 | 4 | 0 | 3 | X | X | X | X | X | 10 |
| (Minnesota) Kenneth Starkey | 2 | 0 | 2 | 0 | 1 | 0 | X | X | X | X | X | 5 |

===== 4 v. 5 =====
| Sheet 3 | 1 | 2 | 3 | 4 | 5 | 6 | 7 | 8 | 9 | 10 | 11 | Final |
|---|---|---|---|---|---|---|---|---|---|---|---|---|
| (Massachusetts) Timothy Ho 🔨 | 2 | 0 | 2 | 0 | 1 | 0 | 2 | 0 | X | X | X | 7 |
| (Arizona) Bob Leclair | 0 | 3 | 0 | 1 | 0 | 3 | 0 | 1 | X | X | X | 8 |

==== Semifinals ====
Sunday, February 11, 12:00pm

===== 1 v. 3 =====
| Sheet 2 | 1 | 2 | 3 | 4 | 5 | 6 | 7 | 8 | 9 | 10 | 11 | Final |
|---|---|---|---|---|---|---|---|---|---|---|---|---|
| (Minnesota) Mike Farbelow | 1 | 0 | 1 | 0 | 1 | 0 | 1 | 5 | X | X | X | 9 |
| (Minnesota) Paul Pustovar 🔨 | 0 | 1 | 0 | 1 | 0 | 1 | 0 | 0 | X | X | X | 3 |

===== 2 v. 5 =====
| Sheet 3 | 1 | 2 | 3 | 4 | 5 | 6 | 7 | 8 | 9 | 10 | 11 | Final |
|---|---|---|---|---|---|---|---|---|---|---|---|---|
| (North Carolina) Murray Jackson | 0 | 1 | 0 | 1 | 0 | 1 | 0 | 0 | X | X | X | 3 |
| (Arizona) Bob Leclair 🔨 | 0 | 0 | 2 | 0 | 1 | 0 | 0 | 1 | X | X | X | 4 |

==== Bronze Match ====
Sunday, February 11, 4:00pm

| Sheet 3 | 1 | 2 | 3 | 4 | 5 | 6 | 7 | 8 | 9 | 10 | 11 | Final |
|---|---|---|---|---|---|---|---|---|---|---|---|---|
| (Minnesota) Paul Pustovar 🔨 | 2 | 0 | 0 | 3 | 0 | 1 | 0 | 1 | X | X | X | 7 |
| (North Carolina) Murray Jackson | 0 | 2 | 1 | 0 | 2 | 0 | 1 | 0 | X | X | X | 6 |

==== Finals ====
Sunday, February 11, 4:00pm

| Sheet 2 | 1 | 2 | 3 | 4 | 5 | 6 | 7 | 8 | 9 | 10 | 11 | Final |
|---|---|---|---|---|---|---|---|---|---|---|---|---|
| (Minnesota) Mike Farbelow | 3 | 0 | 0 | 1 | 0 | 1 | 2 | X | X | X | X | 7 |
| (Arizona) Bob Leclair 🔨 | 0 | 1 | 0 | 0 | 3 | 0 | 0 | X | X | X | X | 4 |

2024 United States Senior Men's Curling Champion
(Minnesota)
Mike Farbelow
2nd United States Senior Men's Curling Championship title

== Women's Event ==
=== Teams ===
The women's teams are listed as follows

| Skip | Third | Second | Lead | Alternate | Locale |
|---|---|---|---|---|---|
| Debra Aubrey | Lu Brock | Tracey Drummond | Karen Cole | Christy Trageton | Tempe, Arizona |
| Susan Dukes | Angela Montgomery | Stephanie Erstad | Anne Gravel | | Madison, Wisconsin |
| Tracy Lawless | Leslie MacGregor | Lisa Johnson | Elizabeth Demers | | Milwaukee, Wisconsin |
| Margie Smith | Ann Swisshelm | Shelly Kosal | Shelley Dropkin | | St. Paul, Minnesota |
| Lisa Tamura | Kathy Placek | Kristine Klinkhammer | Anne Meagher | | Beaverton, Oregon |
| Kimberly Wapola | Lea Ann Tarnowski | Lisa Bachmeier | Juliana Klocek | | St. Paul, Minnesota |
