= 2011 World Senior Curling Championships – Men's tournament =

2011 World Senior Curling Championships Men's tournament
- Host city: St. Paul, Minnesota, United States
- Arena: Saint Paul Curling Club
- Dates: April 15–24, 2011
- Men's winner: Canada
- Curling club: Thistle Curling Club; Edmonton, Alberta
- Skip: Mark Johnson
- Third: Marvin Wirth
- Second: Ken McLean
- Lead: Millard Evans
- Alternate: Brad Hannah
- Finalist: United States (Geoff Goodland)

The men's tournament of the 2011 World Senior Curling Championships was held from April 15 to 24, 2011.

21 teams participated in three groups. The teams played a round robin within their groups, and the top two teams from each group automatically qualified for the quarterfinals. The third-ranked teams among the groups used a draw stone challenge to determine which group took the seventh spot in the quarterfinals. The remaining two third-ranked teams then played a qualification game to determine the last qualifying spot.

== Teams ==
=== Blue Group ===
England	France	Hungary	Japan
Skip: Michael Sutherland Third: Tommy Campbell; Second: John Summers; Lead: Phil Barton; Alternate: John Brown	Skip: Christophe Lehuenen Third: Cyril Vigneau; Second: Yvon Lebailly; Lead: Joseph Chartier; Alternate: Pierre Perrin	Skip: András Rókusfalvy Third: Mihály Verasztó; Second: László Tolnai; Lead: György Kalmár	Skip: Nobuyuki Kato Third: Junichi Ishida; Second: Keiji Kakuta; Lead: Hisashi Ikuta; Alternate: Hiroshi Hasegawa
Netherlands	Scotland	United States	
Skip: Wim Neeleman Third: Frank Kerkvliet; Second: Jos Wilmot; Lead: Bas Bennis	Skip: Ken Horton Third: Gordon Butler; Second: Angus Storrie; Lead: Edmond Binks	Skip: Geoff Goodland Third: Tim Solin; Second: Pete Westberg; Lead: Ken Olson; Alternate: Philip DeVore	

=== Red Group ===
Canada	Czech Republic	Denmark	Finland
Skip: Mark Johnson Third: Marvin Wirth; Second: Ken McLean; Lead: Millard Evans; Alternate: Brad Hannah	Fourth: Ludĕk Hajtl Skip: Petr Slavik; Second: Aleš Plešek; Lead: Ludĕk Dembovsky	Skip: Bent Juul Kristoffersen Third: John Hansen; Second: Hans Anton Jørgensen; Lead: Kurt Holm	Skip: Timo Kauste Third: Jorma Venäläinen; Second: Yrjö Franssila; Lead: Juhani Heinonen; Alternate: Seppo Malinen
Germany	Italy	Sweden	
Skip: Klaus Unterstab Third: Lenard Schulze; Second: Charlie Kapp; Lead: Andreas Helwig; Alternate: Karl Dieter Schäfer	Skip: Danilo Capriolo Third: Eraldo Quero; Second: Mario Bologna; Lead: Guido Barco	Skip: Per Carlsén Third: Mats Nyberg; Second: Stefan Larsson; Lead: Dan Carlsén; Alternate: Claes-Göran Höglund	

=== Green Group ===
Australia	Ireland	Latvia	New Zealand
Skip: Hugh Millikin Third: John Theriault; Second: Jim Allan; Lead: Dave Thomas; Alternate: Tom Kidd	Skip: Peter Wilson Third: David Whyte; Second: Tony Tierney; Lead: David Hume; Alternate: Gerry O'Kane	Skip: Pēteris Šveisbergs Third: Jānis Rēdlihs; Second: Ivars Černajs; Lead: Ģirts Sils	Skip: Peter Becker Third: Richard Morgan; Second: Nelson Ede; Lead: David Greer; Alternate: John Sanders
Russia	Switzerland	Wales	
Skip: Sergey Melnikov Third: Sergey Korolenko; Second: Sergey Narudinov; Lead: Oleg Badilin	Skip: Dieter Strub Third: Peter Kröger; Second: Hansjörg Andres; Lead: Micky Leopri; Alternate: Bruno Mahler	Fourth: Hugh Meikle Skip: Chris Wells; Second: Michael Yuille; Lead: Stewart Cairns; Alternate: Andy Carr	

== Round-robin standings ==
Final round-robin standings

Key
Teams to Playoffs
Teams to Draw Shot Challenge (team with best moves to playoffs, other two play in qualification game)

Blue Group	Skip	W	L
United States	Geoff Goodland	6	0
England	Michael Sutherland	4	2
Scotland	Ken Horton	4	2
Hungary	András Rókusfalvy	3	3
Japan	Nobuyuki Kato	3	3
France	Christophe Lehuenen	1	5
Netherlands	Wim Neeleman	0	6

Red Group	Skip	W	L
Canada	Mark Johnson	6	0
Denmark	Bent Kristoffersen	5	1
Germany	Klaus Unterstab	4	2
Sweden	Per Carlsén	3	3
Finland	Timo Kauste	2	4
Czech Republic	Petr Slavik	1	5
Italy	Danilo Capriolo	0	6

Green Group	Skip	W	L
Switzerland	Dieter Strub	6	0
Australia	Hugh Millikin	5	1
New Zealand	Peter Becker	4	2
Ireland	Peter Wilson	3	3
Wales	Chris Wells	2	4
Russia	Sergey Melnikov	1	5
Latvia	Pēteris Šveisbergs	0	6

== Round-robin results ==
All draw times are listed in Central Standard Time (UTC-06).

=== Blue Group ===
==== Sunday, April 17 ====
Draw 1 08:00

Sheet A	1	2	3	4	5	6	7	8	Final
Netherlands (Neeleman)	0	1	0	0	1	0	0	X	2
Scotland (Horton)	1	0	0	2	0	0	3	X	6

Sheet B	1	2	3	4	5	6	7	8	9	Final
Japan (Kato)	0	2	1	1	0	0	0	2	0	6
United States (Goodland)	2	0	0	0	1	2	1	0	2	8

Sheet C	1	2	3	4	5	6	7	8	Final
England (Sutherland)	0	2	0	3	2	3	X	X	10
Hungary (Rókusfalvy)	1	0	1	0	0	0	X	X	2

Draw 3 18:00

Sheet A	1	2	3	4	5	6	7	8	Final
United States (Goodland)	2	0	3	1	1	0	X	X	7
England (Sutherland)	0	1	0	0	0	1	X	X	2

Sheet B	1	2	3	4	5	6	7	8	Final
Hungary (Rókusfalvy)	0	1	1	0	0	2	1	X	5
Netherlands (Neeleman)	2	0	0	0	1	0	0	X	3

Sheet C	1	2	3	4	5	6	7	8	Final
Scotland (Horton)	1	0	2	1	0	3	1	X	8
France (Lehuenen)	0	1	0	0	1	0	0	X	2

==== Monday, April 18 ====
Draw 6 14:30

Sheet A	1	2	3	4	5	6	7	8	Final
France (Lehuenen)	0	0	3	0	0	1	0	X	4
Hungary (Rókusfalvy)	1	1	0	2	1	0	2	X	7

Sheet E	1	2	3	4	5	6	7	8	Final
Netherlands (Neeleman)	0	0	1	0	2	0	X	X	3
United States (Goodland)	4	1	0	2	0	5	X	X	12

Sheet H	1	2	3	4	5	6	7	8	Final
England (Sutherland)	0	0	0	1	0	1	0	0	2
Japan (Kato)	0	0	1	0	2	0	1	1	5

==== Tuesday, April 19 ====
Draw 8 08:00

Sheet C	1	2	3	4	5	6	7	8	Final
Japan (Kato)	2	0	0	2	3	0	0	X	8
Netherlands (Neeleman)	0	4	1	0	0	1	1	X	7

Sheet D	1	2	3	4	5	6	7	8	Final
United States (Goodland)	0	0	0	2	1	1	0	X	5
France (Lehuenen)	0	0	1	0	0	0	1	X	2

Sheet E	1	2	3	4	5	6	7	8	Final
Hungary (Rókusfalvy)	0	1	0	0	0	0	X	X	1
Scotland (Horton)	4	0	1	1	2	2	X	X	10

Draw 10 18:00

Sheet E	1	2	3	4	5	6	7	8	Final
France (Lehuenen)	0	0	1	0	1	0	0	0	2
Japan (Kato)	1	0	0	1	0	1	2	1	6

Sheet F	1	2	3	4	5	6	7	8	Final
Netherlands (Neeleman)	0	1	0	1	0	0	0	X	2
England (Sutherland)	1	0	1	0	3	2	2	X	9

Sheet G	1	2	3	4	5	6	7	8	Final
Scotland (Horton)	0	0	0	2	0	1	0	X	3
United States (Goodland)	3	1	1	0	2	0	4	X	11

==== Wednesday, April 20 ====
Draw 13 14:30

Sheet F	1	2	3	4	5	6	7	8	9	Final
United States (Goodland)	0	3	0	0	2	0	2	0	1	8
Hungary (Rókusfalvy)	1	0	1	2	0	1	0	2	0	7

Draw 15 21:30

Sheet B	1	2	3	4	5	6	7	8	Final
England (Sutherland)	2	0	3	1	1	1	X	X	8
France (Lehuenen)	0	1	0	0	0	0	X	X	1

Sheet F	1	2	3	4	5	6	7	8	Final
Japan (Kato)	1	0	0	2	0	0	0	X	3
Scotland (Horton)	0	0	1	0	2	2	2	X	7

==== Thursday, April 21 ====
Draw 17 14:30

Sheet D	1	2	3	4	5	6	7	8	9	Final
Scotland (Horton)	1	1	0	0	1	0	0	1	0	4
England (Sutherland)	0	0	0	2	0	1	1	0	1	5

Sheet G	1	2	3	4	5	6	7	8	Final
Hungary (Rókusfalvy)	0	2	1	0	3	0	1	0	7
Japan (Kato)	1	0	0	2	0	2	0	1	6

Sheet H	1	2	3	4	5	6	7	8	Final
France (Lehuenen)	0	1	1	1	0	5	X	X	8
Netherlands (Neeleman)	1	0	0	0	1	0	X	X	2

=== Red Group ===
==== Sunday, April 17 ====
Draw 2 11:30

Sheet A	1	2	3	4	5	6	7	8	Final
Germany (Unterstab)	0	0	0	2	3	2	0	X	7
Italy (Capriolo)	1	2	1	0	0	0	1	X	5

Sheet B	1	2	3	4	5	6	7	8	Final
Finland (Kauste)	1	0	0	2	0	0	0	X	3
Sweden (Carlsén)	0	2	2	0	1	1	1	X	7

Sheet C	1	2	3	4	5	6	7	8	Final
Canada (Johnson)	2	1	0	0	0	1	2	X	6
Denmark (Kristoffersen)	0	0	1	0	0	0	0	X	1

Draw 4 21:30

Sheet D	1	2	3	4	5	6	7	8	Final
Czech Republic (Slavik)	0	0	2	0	0	4	0	1	7
Denmark (Kristoffersen)	3	2	0	1	1	0	2	0	9

Sheet E	1	2	3	4	5	6	7	8	Final
Canada (Johnson)	1	0	3	1	0	2	X	X	7
Finland (Kauste)	0	2	0	0	0	0	X	X	2

Sheet F	1	2	3	4	5	6	7	8	Final
Germany (Unterstab)	1	1	0	1	1	0	3	0	7
Sweden (Carlsén)	0	0	2	0	0	1	0	2	5

==== Monday, April 18 ====
Draw 5 11:00

Sheet A	1	2	3	4	5	6	7	8	Final
Sweden (Carlsén)	0	0	0	2	0	0	1	0	3
Canada (Johnson)	1	0	1	0	0	2	0	1	5

Sheet B	1	2	3	4	5	6	7	8	Final
Denmark (Kristoffersen)	0	0	3	5	1	0	0	X	9
Germany (Unterstab)	1	1	0	0	0	2	1	X	5

Sheet C	1	2	3	4	5	6	7	8	Final
Italy (Capriolo)	0	3	0	0	1	0	2	0	6
Czech Republic (Slavik)	1	0	2	1	0	3	0	1	8

==== Tuesday, April 19 ====
Draw 8 08:00

Sheet F	1	2	3	4	5	6	7	8	Final
Denmark (Kristoffersen)	1	2	0	1	0	2	0	X	6
Italy (Capriolo)	0	0	3	0	1	0	1	X	5

Sheet G	1	2	3	4	5	6	7	8	Final
Finland (Kauste)	2	0	2	0	0	1	0	X	5
Germany (Unterstab)								X	6

Sheet H	1	2	3	4	5	6	7	8	Final
Sweden (Carlsén)	3	3	0	1	0	4	X	X	11
Czech Republic (Slavik)	0	0	1	0	1	0	X	X	2

Draw 10 18:00

Sheet D	1	2	3	4	5	6	7	8	Final
Italy (Capriolo)	0	1	2	0	0	0	0	0	3
Sweden (Carlsén)	1	0	0	2	0	1	1	3	8

Sheet H	1	2	3	4	5	6	7	8	Final
Germany (Unterstab)	0	0	0	1	0	0	X	X	1
Canada (Johnson)	2	1	1	0	1	3	X	X	8

==== Wednesday, April 20 ====
Draw 13 14:30

Sheet B	1	2	3	4	5	6	7	8	Final
Canada (Johnson)	2	0	4	0	4	3	X	X	13
Czech Republic (Slavik)	0	2	0	1	0	0	X	X	3

Sheet E	1	2	3	4	5	6	7	8	Final
Sweden (Carlsén)	0	0	2	0	2	1	1	0	6
Denmark (Kristoffersen)	0	3	0	2	0	0	0	2	7

Sheet H	1	2	3	4	5	6	7	8	Final
Finland (Kauste)	0	2	1	0	3	0	0	2	8
Italy (Capriolo)	2	0	0	2	0	2	1	0	7

==== Thursday, April 21 ====
Draw 17 14:30

Sheet F	1	2	3	4	5	6	7	8	Final
Czech Republic (Slavik)	1	0	1	0	1	0	0	X	3
Finland (Kauste)	0	3	0	1	0	1	2	X	7

Draw 19 21:30

Sheet A	1	2	3	4	5	6	7	8	Final
Denmark (Kristoffersen)	1	1	1	0	1	2	0	X	6
Finland (Kauste)	0	0	0	1	0	0	3	X	4

Sheet E	1	2	3	4	5	6	7	8	Final
Czech Republic (Slavik)	0	0	0	2	0	2	0	X	4
Germany (Unterstab)	2	2	0	0	1	0	2	X	7

Sheet G	1	2	3	4	5	6	7	8	Final
Italy (Capriolo)	0	0	0	0	1	0	X	X	1
Canada (Johnson)	5	3	3	0	0	2	X	X	13

=== Green Group ===
==== Sunday, April 17 ====
Draw 2 11:30

Sheet D	1	2	3	4	5	6	7	8	Final
Russia (Melnikov)	0	0	0	0	0	0	0	X	0
Switzerland (Strub)	0	0	1	0	1	1	2	X	5

Sheet E	1	2	3	4	5	6	7	8	Final
New Zealand (Becker)	1	2	0	2	0	0	0	3	8
Wales (Wells)	0	0	2	0	2	1	1	0	6

Sheet F	1	2	3	4	5	6	7	8	Final
Australia (Millikin)	3	2	0	2	2	0	X	X	9
Latvia (Šveisbergs)	0	0	1	0	0	0	X	X	1

Draw 4 21:30

Sheet A	1	2	3	4	5	6	7	8	Final
Wales (Wells)	0	0	0	2	2	1	0	X	5
Australia (Millikin)	6	3	2	0	0	0	1	X	12

Sheet B	1	2	3	4	5	6	7	8	9	Final
Latvia (Šveisbergs)	0	1	2	0	1	0	1	0	0	5
Russia (Melnikov)	1	0	0	1	0	1	0	2	1	6

Sheet G	1	2	3	4	5	6	7	8	Final
Switzerland (Strub)	1	0	4	1	0	1	1	X	8
Ireland (Wilson)	0	1	0	0	2	0	0	X	3

==== Monday, April 18 ====
Draw 6 14:30

Sheet B	1	2	3	4	5	6	7	8	Final
Australia (Millikin)	0	5	3	3	2	0	X	X	13
New Zealand (Becker)	1	0	0	0	0	1	X	X	2

Sheet D	1	2	3	4	5	6	7	8	9	Final
Ireland (Wilson)	0	1	0	2	1	1	0	0	1	6
Latvia (Šveisbergs)	0	0	3	0	0	0	1	1	0	5

Sheet F	1	2	3	4	5	6	7	8	Final
Russia (Melnikov)	2	0	1	1	0	0	0	0	4
Wales (Wells)	0	1	0	0	1	2	1	1	6

==== Tuesday, April 19 ====
Draw 8 08:00

Sheet A	1	2	3	4	5	6	7	8	Final
New Zealand (Becker)	1	0	1	3	3	0	0	X	8
Russia (Melnikov)	0	1	0	0	0	0	3	X	4

Sheet B	1	2	3	4	5	6	7	8	9	Final
Wales (Wells)	0	0	0	1	1	1	1	0	0	4
Ireland (Wilson)	1	1	1	0	0	0	0	1	1	5

Draw 9 11:30

Sheet A	1	2	3	4	5	6	7	8	Final
Latvia (Šveisbergs)	1	0	1	0	0	0	0	X	2
Switzerland (Strub)	0	2	0	0	3	0	4	X	9

Draw 10 18:00

Sheet C	1	2	3	4	5	6	7	8	Final
Russia (Melnikov)	1	0	0	2	0	1	0	0	4
Australia (Millikin)	0	1	1	0	2	0	1	1	6

Draw 11 21:30

Sheet C	1	2	3	4	5	6	7	8	Final
Switzerland (Strub)	0	1	0	1	0	0	1	2	5
Wales (Wells)	1	0	1	0	1	0	0	0	3

==== Wednesday, April 20 ====
Draw 12 11:00

Sheet C	1	2	3	4	5	6	7	8	9	Final
Ireland (Wilson)	0	2	2	0	1	0	1	0	0	6
New Zealand (Becker)	2	0	0	1	0	2	0	1	1	7

Draw 13 14:30

Sheet G	1	2	3	4	5	6	7	8	Final
Wales (Wells)	1	1	0	3	3	4	X	X	12
Latvia (Šveisbergs)	0	0	2	0	0	0	X	X	2

Draw 15 21:30

Sheet E	1	2	3	4	5	6	7	8	Final
Australia (Millikin)	0	0	2	0	0	1	1	1	5
Ireland (Wilson)	1	0	0	1	0	0	0	0	2

Sheet H	1	2	3	4	5	6	7	8	Final
New Zealand (Becker)	2	0	0	1	0	0	1	0	4
Switzerland (Strub)	0	1	2	0	1	1	0	1	6

==== Thursday, April 21 ====
Draw 19 21:30

Sheet D	1	2	3	4	5	6	7	8	Final
Switzerland (Strub)	0	2	2	0	1	0	0	1	6
Australia (Millikin)	2	0	0	2	0	1	0	0	5

Sheet F	1	2	3	4	5	6	7	8	Final
Latvia (Šveisbergs)	2	0	0	0	1	0	0	X	3
New Zealand (Becker)	0	1	1	0	0	3	2	X	7

Sheet H	1	2	3	4	5	6	7	8	Final
Ireland (Wilson)	2	0	0	2	0	0	0	3	7
Russia (Melnikov)	0	0	1	0	2	1	2	0	6

== Playoffs ==
Qualification Game
R3	Germany	3
B3	Scotland	6

Quarterfinals
R1	Canada	9
B3	Scotland	3
G2	Australia	5
B2	England	4
G1	Switzerland	4
R2	Denmark	5
B1	United States	6
G3	New Zealand	2

Semifinals
R1	Canada	11
G2	Australia	1
R2	Denmark	2
B1	United States	11

Gold Medal Match
R1	Canada	5
B1	United States	4

Bronze Medal Match
G2	Australia	8
R2	Denmark	5

=== Qualification Game ===
Friday, April 22, 15:00

Sheet F	1	2	3	4	5	6	7	8	Final
Germany (Unterstab)	0	1	0	0	1	0	1	X	3
Scotland (Horton)	3	0	1	2	0	0	0	X	6

=== Quarterfinals ===
Friday, April 22, 20:00

Sheet E	1	2	3	4	5	6	7	8	Final
Canada (Johnson)	3	1	0	2	0	0	3	X	9
Scotland (Horton)	0	0	1	0	2	0	0	X	3

Sheet F	1	2	3	4	5	6	7	8	Final
United States (Goodland)	0	1	1	3	0	0	1	X	6
New Zealand (Becker)	1	0	0	0	1	0	0	X	2

Sheet H	1	2	3	4	5	6	7	8	Final
Switzerland (Strub)	0	0	1	0	0	0	3	X	4
Denmark (Kristofferson)	0	1	0	1	2	1	0	X	5

Sheet G	1	2	3	4	5	6	7	8	Final
Australia (Millikin)	0	2	0	1	0	2	0	0	5
England (Sutherland)	1	0	1	0	1	0	0	1	4

=== Semifinals ===
Saturday, April 23, 9:00

Sheet D	1	2	3	4	5	6	7	8	Final
Canada (Johnson)	3	1	1	0	3	3	X	X	11
Australia (Millikin)	0	0	0	1	0	0	X	X	1

Sheet A	1	2	3	4	5	6	7	8	Final
Denmark (Kristoffersen)	0	1	0	1	0	0	X	X	2
United States (Goodland)	4	0	2	0	4	1	X	X	11

=== Bronze medal game ===
Saturday, April 23, 14:00

Sheet B	1	2	3	4	5	6	7	8	9	Final
Australia (Millikin)	0	1	0	0	2	0	2	0	3	8
Denmark (Kristoffersen)	0	0	1	1	0	1	0	2	0	5

=== Gold medal game ===
Saturday, April 23, 14:00

Sheet C	1	2	3	4	5	6	7	8	9	Final
Canada (Johnson)	0	0	2	0	1	0	0	1	1	5
United States (Goodland)	2	0	0	1	0	1	0	0	0	4

2011 World Senior Men's Curling Championship Winner
(Canada)
Canada
7th title
