= 2014 World Senior Curling Championships – Women's tournament =

2014 World Senior Curling Championships Women's tournament
- Host city: Dumfries, Scotland
- Arena: Dumfries Ice Bowl
- Dates: April 23–30
- Winner: Scotland
- Skip: Christine Cannon
- Third: Margaret Richardson
- Second: Isobel Hannen
- Lead: Janet Lindsay
- Alternate: Margaret Robinson
- Finalist: Canada (Colleen Pinkney)

The women's tournament of the 2014 World Senior Curling Championships was held from April 23 to 30 at the Dumfries Ice Bowl in Dumfries, Scotland.

== Teams ==
The teams are listed as follows:

=== Group A ===
Austria	Czech Republic	England	Japan
Skip: Veronika Huber; Third: Edeltraud Koudelka; Second: Anna Reiner; Lead: Heidlinde Gasteiger	Skip: Miroslava Vareckova; Third: Michaela Mechurova; Second: Jana Horackova; Lead: Jitka Slavikova	Skip: Jean Robinson; Third: Judith Dixon; Second: Susan Young; Lead: Deborah Higgins; Alternate: Jacqueline Orr	Skip: Shizuko Funaki; Third: Chizuko Hamadate; Second: Keiko Motoki; Lead: Tsuyako Yokouchi; Alternate: Haruko Chiba
New Zealand	Slovakia	Sweden	United States
Skip: Wendy Becker; Third: Elizabeth Matthews; Second: Glenys Taylor; Lead: Pauline Farra	Fourth: Elena Jancarikova; Third: Maria Liptakova; Skip: Margita Matuskovicova; Lead: Maria Pandorova	Skip: Ingrid Meldahl; Third: Ann-Catrin Kjerr; Second: Birgitta Törn; Lead: Sylvia Liljefors; Alternate: Mia Lehander	Skip: Margie Smith; Third: Norma O'Leary; Second: Debbie Dexter; Lead: Shelly Kosal

=== Group B ===
Australia	Canada	Finland	Italy
Skip: Sandy Gagnon; Third: Ellen Weir; Second: Janet Cobden; Lead: Jenny Riordan	Skip: Colleen Pinkney; Third: Wendy Currie; Second: Shelley MacNutt; Lead: Susan Creelman; Alternate: Judy Burgess	Skip: Kirsti Kauste; Third: Tuula Merentie; Second: Riita-Liisa Hämäläinen; Lead: Helena Sorvari	Skip: Fiona Grace Simpson; Third: Vittoria Santini; Second: Grazia Ferrero; Lead: Caterina Colucci; Alternate: Roberta Masinari
Russia	Scotland	Switzerland	
Skip: Ludmila Murova; Third: Natalia Ilyenkova; Second: Antonia Trefilova; Lead: Larissa Pismenova; Alternate: Ekaterina Priemskaja	Skip: Christine Cannon; Third: Margaret Richardson; Second: Isobel Hannen; Lead: Janet Lindsay; Alternate: Margaret Robinson	Skip: Susan Limena; Third: Sandra Zimmerman; Second: Monika Kehrli; Lead: Lucy Ebner; Alternate: Erika Wohlmann	

== Round-robin standings ==
Final round-robin standings

Key
Teams to Playoffs

Group A	Skip	W	L
United States	Margie Smith	7	0
Sweden	Ingrid Meldahl	5	2
Slovakia	Margita Matuskovicova	4	3
New Zealand	Wendy Becker	3	4
Czech Republic	Miroslava Vareckova	3	4
England	Jean Robinson	3	4
Austria	Veronika Huber	2	5
Japan	Shizuko Funaki	1	6

Group B	Skip	W	L
Canada	Colleen Pinkney	6	0
Scotland	Christine Cannon	5	1
Switzerland	Susan Limena	4	2
Australia	Sandy Gagnon	3	3
Finland	Kirsti Kauste	2	4
Italy	Fiona Grace Simpson	1	5
Russia	Ludmila Murova	0	6

== Round-robin results ==
=== Group A ===
==== Thursday, April 24 ====
Draw 3 15:30

Sheet C	1	2	3	4	5	6	7	8	Final
Czech Republic (Vareckova)	0	0	3	0	1	0	3	0	7
Japan (Funaki) 🔨	1	3	0	1	0	1	0	2	8

Sheet D	1	2	3	4	5	6	7	8	Final
New Zealand (Becker) 🔨	2	1	0	1	0	0	2	1	7
Sweden (Meldahl)	0	0	1	0	2	3	0	0	6

Sheet E	1	2	3	4	5	6	7	8	Final
England (Robinson) 🔨	1	0	1	0	0	2	0	X	4
United States (Smith)	0	6	0	1	1	0	1	X	9

Sheet F	1	2	3	4	5	6	7	8	Final
Austria (Huber)	0	2	0	0	2	0	1	0	5
Slovakia (Matuskovicova) 🔨	1	0	1	1	0	2	0	1	6

==== Friday, April 25 ====
Draw 5 7:30

Sheet C	1	2	3	4	5	6	7	8	Final
Slovakia (Matuskovicova) 🔨	1	1	2	1	0	1	1	X	7
England (Robinson)	0	0	0	0	1	0	0	X	1

Draw 6 11:00

Sheet A	1	2	3	4	5	6	7	8	Final
Austria (Huber)	0	0	2	0	1	0	X	X	3
United States (Smith) 🔨	2	1	0	2	0	5	X	X	10

Sheet E	1	2	3	4	5	6	7	8	9	Final
Czech Republic (Vareckova)	0	0	0	0	0	2	5	0	1	8
New Zealand (Becker) 🔨	2	1	1	1	1	0	0	1	0	7

Draw 7 14:30

Sheet F	1	2	3	4	5	6	7	8	Final
Japan (Funaki)	0	1	1	0	1	1	0	X	4
Sweden (Meldahl) 🔨	4	0	0	1	0	0	2	X	7

Draw 8 18:00

Sheet A	1	2	3	4	5	6	7	8	Final
Czech Republic (Vareckova)	0	0	2	1	0	2	0	0	5
England (Robinson) 🔨	1	1	0	0	2	0	1	1	6

Sheet F	1	2	3	4	5	6	7	8	Final
New Zealand (Becker) 🔨	0	1	2	1	0	1	0	X	5
United States (Smith)	2	0	0	0	4	0	2	X	8

Draw 9 21:30

Sheet B	1	2	3	4	5	6	7	8	9	Final
Austria (Huber)	1	0	0	0	1	0	2	2	0	6
Sweden (Meldahl) 🔨	0	1	1	1	0	3	0	0	1	7

Sheet E	1	2	3	4	5	6	7	8	Final
Slovakia (Matuskovicova)	0	3	4	0	0	0	3	X	10
Japan (Funaki) 🔨	1	0	0	3	1	1	0	X	6

==== Saturday, April 26 ====
Draw 11 12:00

Sheet D	1	2	3	4	5	6	7	8	Final
United States (Smith) 🔨	3	1	2	0	1	0	1	X	8
Japan (Funaki)	0	0	0	1	0	2	0	X	3

Draw 12 15:30

Sheet C	1	2	3	4	5	6	7	8	Final
New Zealand (Becker)	0	1	0	0	0	0	X	X	1
Slovakia (Matuskovicova) 🔨	1	0	3	3	4	1	X	X	12

Draw 13 19:00

Sheet C	1	2	3	4	5	6	7	8	Final
Austria (Huber) 🔨	1	1	0	0	0	0	X	X	2
Czech Republic (Vareckova)	0	0	5	2	4	1	X	X	12

Sheet E	1	2	3	4	5	6	7	8	Final
Sweden (Meldahl) 🔨	0	1	2	0	2	0	1	1	7
England (Robinson)	1	0	0	1	0	1	0	0	3

==== Sunday, April 27 ====
Draw 15 11:00

Sheet C	1	2	3	4	5	6	7	8	9	Final
United States (Smith) 🔨	1	0	0	0	0	1	1	1	5	9
Sweden (Meldahl)	0	0	1	2	1	0	0	0	0	4

Sheet D	1	2	3	4	5	6	7	8	Final
Czech Republic (Vareckova) 🔨	2	1	1	0	0	1	1	X	6
Slovakia (Matuskovicova)	0	0	0	1	1	0	0	X	2

Draw 17 18:00

Sheet B	1	2	3	4	5	6	7	8	Final
England (Robinson)	0	0	0	2	1	2	1	1	7
Japan (Funaki) 🔨	2	1	1	0	0	0	0	0	4

Draw 18 21:30

Sheet B	1	2	3	4	5	6	7	8	9	Final
New Zealand (Becker) 🔨	0	0	2	1	0	1	2	1	0	7
Austria (Huber)	2	2	0	0	3	0	0	0	1	8

==== Monday, April 28 ====
Draw 20 12:00

Sheet F	1	2	3	4	5	6	7	8	Final
Sweden (Meldahl)	0	4	0	1	0	1	1	X	7
Czech Republic (Vareckova) 🔨	1	0	1	0	2	0	0	X	4

Draw 21 15:30

Sheet A	1	2	3	4	5	6	7	8	Final
Japan (Funaki)	0	0	2	0	1	0	X	X	3
New Zealand (Becker) 🔨	3	1	0	3	0	5	X	X	12

Sheet B	1	2	3	4	5	6	7	8	Final
Slovakia (Matuskovicova) 🔨	3	1	0	1	0	0	2	0	7
United States (Smith)	0	0	2	0	1	2	0	3	8

Sheet D	1	2	3	4	5	6	7	8	Final
England (Robinson)	1	1	2	0	1	1	0	1	7
Austria (Huber) 🔨	0	0	0	1	0	0	3	0	4

==== Tuesday, April 29 ====
Draw 23 8:30

Sheet B	1	2	3	4	5	6	7	8	Final
United States (Smith)	0	1	0	0	2	0	3	1	7
Czech Republic (Vareckova) 🔨	1	0	1	1	0	1	0	0	4

Sheet E	1	2	3	4	5	6	7	8	9	Final
Japan (Funaki)	1	0	1	2	0	1	1	1	0	7
Austria (Huber) 🔨	0	4	0	0	3	0	0	0	2	9

Draw 24 14:00

Sheet A	1	2	3	4	5	6	7	8	Final
Sweden (Meldahl) 🔨	0	2	1	3	0	0	2	X	8
Slovakia (Matuskovicova)	1	0	0	0	2	0	0	X	3

Sheet F	1	2	3	4	5	6	7	8	Final
England (Robinson)	0	0	0	1	0	0	0	X	1
New Zealand (Becker) 🔨	1	1	1	0	2	2	2	X	9

=== Group B ===
==== Thursday, April 24 ====
Draw 3 15:30

Sheet A	1	2	3	4	5	6	7	8	Final
Finland (Kauste)	0	0	0	0	2	3	0	X	5
Switzerland (Limena) 🔨	1	1	3	3	0	0	2	X	10

Sheet B	1	2	3	4	5	6	7	8	Final
Australia (Gagnon) 🔨	1	0	1	1	2	0	0	1	6
Italy (Simpson)	0	3	0	0	0	1	1	0	5

Draw 4 19:30

Sheet B	1	2	3	4	5	6	7	8	Final
Scotland (Cannon) 🔨	0	1	0	0	1	0	0	X	2
Canada (Pinkney)	1	0	2	2	0	2	2	X	9

==== Friday, April 25 ====
Draw 7 14:30

Sheet A	1	2	3	4	5	6	7	8	Final
Switzerland (Limena)	3	1	3	1	2	1	X	X	11
Australia (Gagnon) 🔨	0	0	0	0	0	0	X	X	0

Draw 8 18:00

Sheet C	1	2	3	4	5	6	7	8	Final
Russia (Murova)	0	1	0	0	0	0	X	X	1
Finland (Kauste) 🔨	1	0	1	1	4	2	X	X	9

Sheet E	1	2	3	4	5	6	7	8	Final
Canada (Pinkney) 🔨	0	1	1	0	5	0	X	X	7
Italy (Simpson)	0	0	0	1	0	1	X	X	2

==== Saturday, April 26 ====
Draw 10 8:30

Sheet D	1	2	3	4	5	6	7	8	Final
Scotland (Cannon) 🔨	2	1	0	0	3	0	1	X	7
Australia (Gagnon)	0	0	1	0	0	1	0	X	2

Sheet E	1	2	3	4	5	6	7	8	Final
Italy (Simpson)	0	0	2	0	0	0	1	1	4
Finland (Kauste) 🔨	2	1	0	1	1	2	0	0	7

Draw 11 12:00

Sheet B	1	2	3	4	5	6	7	8	Final
Switzerland (Limena)	1	0	0	1	0	1	1	0	4
Russia (Murova) 🔨	0	1	0	0	1	0	0	1	3

Draw 13 19:00

Sheet A	1	2	3	4	5	6	7	8	Final
Scotland (Cannon)	0	2	1	0	0	3	2	X	8
Russia (Murova) 🔨	1	0	0	0	1	0	0	X	2

==== Sunday, April 27 ====
Draw 14 7:30

Sheet A	1	2	3	4	5	6	7	8	Final
Canada (Pinkney)	4	0	1	2	2	0	X	X	9
Finland (Kauste) 🔨	0	1	0	0	0	2	X	X	3

Sheet D	1	2	3	4	5	6	7	8	Final
Italy (Simpson) 🔨	0	2	0	1	0	0	0	X	3
Switzerland (Limena)	2	0	2	0	2	2	1	X	9

Draw 16 14:30

Sheet A	1	2	3	4	5	6	7	8	Final
Russia (Murova)	0	0	1	0	0	0	1	X	2
Italy (Simpson) 🔨	1	2	0	5	1	1	0	X	10

Sheet D	1	2	3	4	5	6	7	8	Final
Finland (Kauste)	1	0	1	0	1	0	X	X	3
Scotland (Cannon) 🔨	0	3	0	2	0	5	X	X	10

Draw 17 18:00

Sheet C	1	2	3	4	5	6	7	8	Final
Australia (Gagnon)	0	0	0	2	0	1	0	X	3
Canada (Pinkney) 🔨	2	2	2	0	3	0	3	X	12

==== Monday, April 28 ====
Draw 21 15:30

Sheet C	1	2	3	4	5	6	7	8	Final
Canada (Pinkney)	1	0	0	2	0	5	0	X	8
Switzerland (Limena) 🔨	0	1	0	0	1	0	1	X	3

Draw 22 19:00

Sheet C	1	2	3	4	5	6	7	8	Final
Italy (Simpson)	1	0	0	0	0	1	X	X	2
Scotland (Cannon) 🔨	0	1	1	3	3	0	X	X	8

==== Tuesday, April 29 ====
Draw 24 14:00

Sheet B	1	2	3	4	5	6	7	8	Final
Finland (Kauste)	0	0	1	0	1	0	0	X	2
Australia (Gagnon) 🔨	2	1	0	2	0	2	1	X	8

Sheet D	1	2	3	4	5	6	7	8	Final
Russia (Murova)	0	0	0	1	0	1	X	X	2
Canada (Pinkney) 🔨	4	3	2	0	4	0	X	X	13

Sheet E	1	2	3	4	5	6	7	8	Final
Switzerland (Limena)	0	1	0	0	1	0	1	0	3
Scotland (Cannon) 🔨	1	0	1	1	0	1	0	2	6

== Playoffs ==
Quarterfinals
B2	Scotland	8
A3	Slovakia	4
A2	Sweden	8
B3	Switzerland	2

Semifinals
A1	United States	4
B2	Scotland	5
B1	Canada	6
A2	Sweden	5

Final
B2	Scotland	6
B1	Canada	5

Bronze Medal Game
A1	United States	8
A2	Sweden	3

=== Quarterfinals ===
Tuesday, April 29, 19:30

Sheet B	1	2	3	4	5	6	7	8	Final
Scotland (Cannon) 🔨	3	0	1	0	2	0	0	2	8
Slovakia (Matuskovicova)	0	1	0	1	0	1	1	0	4

Sheet C	1	2	3	4	5	6	7	8	Final
Sweden (Meldahl) 🔨	0	2	0	2	2	1	1	X	8
Switzerland (Limena)	1	0	1	0	0	0	0	X	2

=== Semifinals ===
Wednesday, April 30, 8:00

Sheet D	1	2	3	4	5	6	7	8	9	Final
United States (Smith)	0	1	0	1	0	1	0	1	0	4
Scotland (Cannon) 🔨	0	0	1	0	2	0	1	0	1	5

Sheet E	1	2	3	4	5	6	7	8	Final
Canada (Pinkney)	0	2	1	1	0	0	2	0	6
Sweden (Meldahl) 🔨	1	0	0	0	2	1	0	1	5

=== Bronze medal game ===
Wednesday, April 30, 12:30

Sheet C	1	2	3	4	5	6	7	8	Final
United States (Smith) 🔨	2	0	2	1	0	2	1	X	8
Sweden (Meldahl)	0	1	0	0	2	0	0	X	3

=== Gold medal game ===
Wednesday, April 30, 12:30

Sheet B	1	2	3	4	5	6	7	8	Final
Scotland (Cannon)	0	0	0	1	1	0	2	2	6
Canada (Pinkney) 🔨	0	2	1	0	0	2	0	0	5
