= United States Senior Curling Championships =

National curling championship for adults over 50

- Established: 2002
- 2026 host city: Hartland, Wisconsin
- 2026 arena: Kettle Moraine Curling Club & Wauwatosa Curling Club

Current champions (2026)
- Men: (Minnesota) Mike Farbelow
- Women: (Minnesota) Margie Smith

The United States Senior Curling Championships are the annual national curling championships for seniors in the United States. The United States Curling Association (USCA) defines seniors as adults over the age of 50. The champions go on to represent the United States at the World Senior Curling Championships. The USCA has held the Senior Championships since 2002, coinciding with the first year the World Senior Championships were held. Those first World Senior Championships were held in Bismarck, North Dakota and the American men won the gold medal.

The 2024 United States Men's Senior Championships was held February 7-11, 2024, at the Heather Curling Club in Mapleton, MN, and the 2024 United States Women's Senior Championships was held February 19-25, 2024, at the Circle City Curling Club in Anderson, IN.

== Past champions ==
=== Men ===
Year	Site	Skip	Third	Second	Lead	Alternate	Winning club
2002	Superior, WI	Larry Johnson	Stan Vinge	George Godfrey	Bill Kind	Steve Brown	Grand Forks, ND
2003	Bemidji, MN	Scott Baird	Mark Haluptzok	Bob Fenson	Bob Naylor	Richard Reierson	Bemidji, MN
2004	Grafton, ND	George Godfrey	Bill Kind	Walt Erbach	Larry Sharp	Steve Brown	Madison, WI
2005	Portage, WI	David Russell	Bill Rhyme	Mark Swandby	Dave Carlson	Bill Kind	Centerville, WI
2006	Medford, WI	Brian Simonson	Tom Harms	John Kokotovich	Don Mohawk		Hibbing, MN
2007	Milwaukee, WI	Geoff Goodland	Stan Vinge	Wally Henry	Jim Wilson		Eau Claire, WI
2008	Highland Park, IL	David Russell	Bill Rhyme	Mark Swandby	Dave Carlson	Mike Fraboni	Centerville, WI
2009	Rice Lake, WI	Paul Pustovar	Brian Simonson	Tom Harms	Don Mohawk		Hibbing, MN
2010	Portage, WI	Paul Pustovar	Brian Simonson	Tom Harms	Don Mohawk		Hibbing, MN
2011	Wayland, MA	Geoff Goodland	Tim Solin	Pete Westberg	Ken Olson		St. Paul, MN
2012	Bismarck, ND	Ian Journeaux	David Carlson	Tim Funk	Ken Spatola		Stevens Point, WI
2013	Fairbanks, AK	Gert Messing	Dennis Mellerup	Bill Nickle	Bill Peskoff		Ardsley, NY
2014	Portage, WI	Jeff Wright	Russ Armstrong	Russ Brown	Nils Johansson	Jim Wilson	Chicago, IL
2015	Eveleth, MN	Lyle Sieg	Tom Violette	Ken Trask	Steve Lundeen	Duane Rutan	Seattle, WA
2016	Medford, WI	Geoff Goodland	Pete Westberg	Tim Solin	Jeff Annis		Eau Claire, WI
2017	Centerville, WI	Mike Farbelow	Geoff Goodland	Tim Solin	Pete Westberg	Jeff Annis	St. Paul, MN
2018	Duluth, MN	Jeff Wright	Russ Armstrong	Russ Brown	Sean Silver	Steve Waters	Chicago, IL
2019	Mapleton, MN	Geoff Goodland	Mike Fraboni	Dan Wiza	Pete Westberg	Todd Birr	Eau Claire, WI
2020	Fairbanks, AK	Joel Larway	Doug Kauffman	Darren Lehto	John Rasmussen		Seattle, WA
2021	Cancelled						
2022	Highland Park, IL	Bob Leclair	Greg Gallagher	Jeff Baird	Tom Danielson	Fred Maxie	Goodyear, AZ
2023	Seattle, WA	Joel Larway	Doug Kauffman	Darren Lehto	John Rasmussen		Seattle, WA
2024	Mapleton, MN	Mike Farbelow	Rich Ruohonen	Bill Stopera	Tim Solin		St. Paul, MN
2025	Traverse City, MI	Mike Farbelow	Rich Ruohonen	Bill Stopera	Darren Lehto		St. Paul, MN
2026	Hartland, WI	Mike Farbelow	Rich Ruohonen	Bill Stopera	Darren Lehto		St. Paul, MN

=== Women ===
Year	Site	Skip	Third	Second	Lead	Alternate	Winning club
2002	Superior, WI	Nancy Dinsdale	Donna Purkey	Linda Handyside	Rosemary Morgan	Barb Cornelsen	Nashua, NH
2003	Bemidji, MN	LaVonne Berg	Delores McDonald	Paddy Hutson	Nancy Rentfrow	Jean Vorachek	Grafton, ND
2004	Grafton, ND	Nancy Dinsdale	Anne Wiggins	Anne Robertson	Jan Stahlheber	Rosemary Morgan	Nashua, NH
2005	Portage, WI	Anne Wiggins	Jean Murphy	Carol White	Rosemary Morgan	Carolyn Macleod	Bridgeport, CT
2006	No site needed	Jamie Hutchinson	Shelley Johnson	Carolyn Macleod	Cheryl Pieske	Karen Gloyd	Wayland, MA
2007	Milwaukee, WI	Pam Oleinik	Laurie Rahn	Susan Curtis	JoAnn Matthews	Donna Purkey	Wauwatosa, WI
2008	Highland Park, IL	Pam Oleinik	Laurie Rahn	Susan Curtis	JoAnn Matthews	Donna Purkey	Wauwatosa, WI
2009	Janesville, WI	Sharon Vukich	Joan (Mary) Fish	Cathie Tomlinson	Aija Edwards		Seattle, WA
2010	Cape Cod, MA	Sharon Vukich	Linda Cornfield	Susan Curtis	Betty Kozai	Dani Thibodeaux	Seattle, WA
2011	Bismarck, ND	Margie Smith	Debbie Dexter	Sally Barry	Rachel Orvik		St. Paul, MN
2012	Grafton, ND	Pam Oleinik	Laurie Rahn	Julie Denten	Stephanie Martin	Joni Cotten	Milwaukee, WI
2013	Fairbanks, AK	Margie Smith	Norma O'Leary	Debbie Dexter	Shelly Kosal	Lucy DeVore	St. Paul, MN
2014	Eau Claire, WI	Margie Smith	Norma O'Leary	Debbie Dexter	Shelly Kosal		St. Paul, MN
2015	Eveleth, MN	Norma O'Leary	Linda Christensen	Mary Shields	Lucy DeVore		Duluth, MN
2016	Columbus, OH	Norma O'Leary	Linda Christensen	Mary Shields	Lucy DeVore		Duluth, MN
2017	Beaverton, OR	Patti Lank	Tracy Lawless	Kathy Pielage	Sandy Brown		Lewiston, NY
2018	Duluth, MN	Margie Smith	Debbie Dexter	Peggy Gazzola	Shelly Kosal		St. Paul, MN
2019	Portage, WI	Margie Smith	Norma O'Leary	Debbie Dexter	Shelly Kosal		St. Paul, MN
2020	Fairbanks, AK	Margie Smith	Ann Swisshelm	Shelley Dropkin	Shelly Kosal		St. Paul, MN
2021	Cancelled						
2022	Bowling Green, OH	Margie Smith	Ann Swisshelm	Shelly Kosal	Shelley Dropkin		St. Paul, MN
2023	Seattle, WA	Margie Smith	Ann Swisshelm	Shelly Kosal	Shelley Dropkin		St. Paul, MN
2024	Anderson, IN	Angela Montgomery	Susan Dukes	Stephanie Erstad	Anne Gravel		Madison, WI
2025	Traverse City, MI	Margie Smith	Norma O'Leary	Shelly Kinney	Shelly Kosal		St. Paul, MN
2026	Hartland, WI	Margie Smith	Norma O'Leary	Shelly Kinney	Shelly Kosal		St. Paul, MN
