= Doug Kauffman =

American curler

- Curler
- Other names: Doogie, DJ
- Born: February 4, 1969 (age 57); Hayward, California, United States

Team
- Curling club: Granite CC, Seattle, Washington

Curling career
- Member Association: United States
- World Championship: 2 (2001, 2004)
Medal record
Curling
United States Men's Championship
Gold medal – first place	2001 Madison
Gold medal – first place	2004 Grand Forks
United States Olympic Curling Trials
Bronze medal – third place	2005 Madison
United States Senior Championships
Gold medal – first place	2020 Fairbanks

Doug Kauffman (born September 18, 1973) is an American curler from Hayward, California.

At the national level, he is a two-time United States men's curling champion (2001, 2004).

Kauffman picked up curling in his late twenties while living in Seattle, having seen it on television and then watching the 1997 National Championship live at the local Granite Curling Club.

== Teams ==
Season	Skip	Third	Second	Lead	Alternate	Coach	Events
1998–99	John Wallen	Leon Romaniuk	?	Doug Kauffman			
2000–01	Jason Larway	Greg Romaniuk	Travis Way	Joel Larway	Doug Kauffman	Jack McNelly	USMCC 2001 (gold); WCC 2001 (6th)
2001–02	Jason Larway	Craig Disher	Travis Way	Joel Larway	Doug Kauffman	Mike Hawkins	USOCT 2001 (7th)
2001–02	Jason Larway	Greg Romaniuk	Joel Larway	Doug Kauffman			USMCC 2002 (6th)
2003–04	Jason Larway	Doug Pottinger	Joel Larway	Bill Todhunter	Doug Kauffman	Don Pottinger	USMCC 2004 (gold); WCC 2004 (9th)
2004–05	Brady Clark	Greg Persinger	Colin Hufman	Ken Trask	Doug Kauffman		USOCT 2005 (bronze)
2006–07	Phil Tilker	Darren Lehto	Paul Lyttle	Doug Kauffman			
2008–09	Phil Tilker (4th)	Darren Lehto (skip)	Paul Lyttle	Doug Kauffman			
2011–12	Doug Kauffman	Paul Lyttle	John Rasmussen	Liam Barksdale			
2013–14	Doug Kauffman	Cristin Clark	Peter Sommer	Bob Knievel			
2019–20	Joel Larway	Doug Kauffman	Darren Lehto	John Rasmussen			USSCC 2020 (gold)

== Personal life ==
Kauffman married to Katie, they have one son Connor.

He works as Director of Golf at the Members Club at Aldarra.

He started curling in 1998 when he was at the age of 29. In the past he has coached his son's U-18 team, composed of skip Connor Kauffman along with Andrew Bell, Alex Couckuyt and Arjun Thomas.
