= Margie Smith =

American curler (born 1960)

- Curler
- Born: March 20, 1960 (age 66); Winnipeg, Manitoba, Canada

Team
- Curling club: St. Paul CC, St. Paul, Minnesota
- Skip: Margie Smith
- Third: Norma O'Leary
- Second: Debbie Dexter
- Lead: Shelly Kosal

Curling career
- World Championship: 0
Medal record
Curling
Representing United States
World Senior Curling Championships
Silver medal – second place	2018 Östersund
Silver medal – second place	2022 Geneva
Bronze medal – third place	2014 Dumfries
Representing Minnesota
United States Women's Curling Championship
Silver medal – second place	1987 St. Paul
Bronze medal – third place	2000 Ogden
Bronze medal – third place	2006 Bemidji

Margie Smith (born March 20, 1960, in Winnipeg, Manitoba) is an American curler from Shoreview, Minnesota. She is the reigning U.S. national senior women's champion.

Smith has played in eight national championships, coming closest to winning in her first event in 1987, where she lost in the final to Washington's Sharon Good. She has also curled in the 1991, 1994, 1998, 2000, 2006, 2009 and 2011 U.S. women's championships.

Smith has won the women's senior national championship a record ten times, most recently on January 18, 2026, when her team defeated Ericka Brown's undefeated team in an incredible showdown in the finals. Her 2011 National championship qualified her and her team of Debbie Dexter, Rachel Orvik, and Sally Barry to represent the United States at the 2011 World Senior Curling Championships. They finished the round robin in second place with an 8–2 record, but they lost both their semi-final match and the bronze medal match, forcing them to settle for 4th place. They won the women's senior national championship again in 2023.

On top of her other successes, Smith also won the 2007 U.S. club national championship.

== Teams ==
Season	Skip	Vice	Second	Lead	Alternate	Coach	Events
2010-11	Margie Smith	Debbie Dexter	Sally Barry	Rachel Orvik			2011 US Senior Women's Curling Championship (gold)
2010-11	Margie Smith	Debbie Dexter	Rachel Orvik	Sally Barry	Shelly Kosal		2011 World Senior Women's Curling Championships (4th)
2012-13	Margie Smith	Norma O'Leary	Debbie Dexter	Shelly Kosal	Lucy DeVore		2013 US Senior Women's Curling Championship (gold)
2013-14	Margie Smith	Norma O'Leary	Debbie Dexter	Shelly Kosal			2014 US Senior Women's Curling Championship (gold) 2014 World Women's Senior Curling Championship (bronze)
2017-18	Margie Smith	Debbie Dexter	Peggy Gazzola	Shelly Kosal			2018 US Senior Women's Curling Championship (gold) 2018 World Women's Senior Curling Championship (silver)
2018-19	Margie Smith	Norma O'Leary	Debbie Dexter	Shelly Kosal			2019 US Senior Women's Curling Championship (gold)
2019-20	Margie Smith	Ann Swisshelm	Shelley Dropkin	Shelly Kosal			2020 US Senior Women's Curling Championship (gold)
2021-22	Margie Smith	Ann Swisshelm	Shelly Kosal	Shelley Dropkin			2022 US Senior Women's Curling Championship (gold) 2022 World Women's Senior Curling Championship (silver)
2022-23	Margie Smith	Ann Swisshelm	Shelly Kosal	Shelley Dropkin			2023 US Senior Women's Curling Championship (gold)
