= Tim Solin =

American curler

- Curler ♂
- Born: June 18, 1958 (age 68); Superior, Wisconsin, U.S.

Team
- Curling club: Superior CC, Superior, Wisconsin

Curling career
- Member Association: United States
- Olympic: 1 (1998)
- Other appearances: World Senior Championships: 3 (2011, 2016, 2017)
Medal record
Curling
World Senior Championships
Silver medal – second place	2011 St. Paul

Timothy Solin (born June 18, 1958, in Superior, Wisconsin, United States) is an American curler. He competed in the 1998 Winter Olympics and at three World Senior Curling Championships.

== Curling career ==
He played at the 1998 Winter Olympics as alternate for Tim Somerville's team, where USA men's team finished in fourth place. In 2007 he played second for Mike Farbelow when they won the Minnesota State Championship and then won the United States Men's Club Championship.

Solin has won the United States Senior Men's Championship three times, in 2011 and 2016 with Geoff Goodland as skip and 2017 with Mike Farbelow as skip. Winning Senior Nationals earns the team the chance to represent the United States at the World Senior Curling Championships; Solin's first trip to World Seniors in 2011 has been his most successful, earning the silver medal when they lost to Canada's Mark Johnson in the final. At the 2016 World Seniors Team Goodland again made it to the playoffs, but lost to Denmark in the quarterfinals. In 2017 Solin's team failed to make the playoffs, finishing the round-robin with a 3–4 record.

== Awards ==
- 2011 United States Curling Association Team of the Year (with teammates Geoff Goodland, Pete Westberg, Ken Olson, and Philip DeVore)

== Teams ==
Season	Skip	Third	Second	Lead	Alternate	Events
1994–95	Kent Beadle	Tim Solin	Chuck McCann	Mike Dexter		
1997–98	Tim Somerville	Mike Peplinski	Myles Brundidge	John Gordon	Tim Solin	1998 WOG (4th)
1998–99	Tim Solin	Kent Beadle	Pete Westberg	Ken Olson		
2007–08	Mike Farbelow	Nick Myers	Tim Solin	Tim Gartner		
2008–09	Mike Farbelow	Nick Myers	Tim Solin	Tim Gartner		2009 USMCC/USOCT (7th)
2009–10	Geoff Goodland	Tim Solin	Pete Westberg	Ken Olson		
2010–11	Geoff Goodland	Tim Solin	Pete Westberg	Ken Olson		2011 USMCC (10th); 2011 USSCC (gold); 2011 WSCC (silver)
2011–12	Mike Farbelow	Kevin Deeran	Kraig Deeran	Tim Solin		2012 USMCC (8th)
2012–13	Geoff Goodland	Tim Solin	Pete Westberg	Ken Olson		
2013–14	Geoff Goodland	Pete Westberg	Tim Solin	Cal Tillisch		2014 USSCC (DNQ)
2015–16	Geoff Goodland	Pete Westberg	Tim Solin	Jeff Annis	Philip DeVore	2016 USSCC (gold); 2016 WSCC (5th)
2016–17	Mike Farbelow	Geoff Goodland	Pete Westberg	Tim Solin	Jeff Annis	2017 USSCC (gold); 2017 WSCC (13th)
2018–19	Mike Farbelow	Tim Solin	Randy Cumming	Jeff Annis		2017 USSCC (DNP)
2019–20	Mike Farbelow	Tim Solin	Pete Westberg	Jeff Annis		2020 USSCC (SF)
