= Darren Lehto =

American male curler

- Curler ♂
- Born: May 17, 1968 (age 58); Athabasca, Alberta, Canada

Team
- Curling club: Granite CC, Seattle, WA
- Skip: Mike Farbelow
- Third: Rich Ruohonen
- Second: Bill Stopera
- Lead: Darren Lehto

Curling career
- Member Association: United States
- World Championship: 1 (2013)
- Other appearances: World Senior Curling Championships: 3 (2024, 2025, 2026)
Medal record
Curling
Representing United States
World Senior Curling Championships
Gold medal – first place	2026 Geneva
Silver medal – second place	2024 Östersund
Bronze medal – third place	2025 Fredericton
United States Men's Championship
Gold medal – first place	2013
Silver medal – second place	2003

Darren Lehto (born May 17, 1968) is a Canadian-American curler from Athabasca, Alberta.

He won the 2013 United States Men's Curling Championship, earning the chance to compete at the 2013 World Men's Championship in Victoria, British Columbia. They finished ninth at World's.

At the national level Lehto has also won the 2005 United States Mixed Curling Championship and the 2020 United States Senior Curling Championship. The latter means he will again play on the world level, representing the United States at the 2020 World Senior Curling Championships in Kelowna, British Columbia in April, 2020.

== Teams ==
=== Men's ===
Season	Skip	Third	Second	Lead	Alternate	Coach	Events
2002–03	Craig Brown	Leon Romaniuk	Greg Romaniuk	Darren Lehto			USMCC 2003 (silver)
2006–07	Phil Tilker	Darren Lehto	Paul Lyttle	Doug Kauffman			
2009–10	Craig Brown	Rich Ruohonen	Darren Lehto	Pete Annis			
2011–12	Craig Brown	Darren Lehto	Leon Romaniuk	Steve Lundeen	Wes Johnson		USMCC 2012 (4th)
2012–13	Brady Clark	Sean Beighton	Darren Lehto	Phil Tilker	Greg Persinger (WCC)	Ken Trask	USMCC 2013 (gold); WCC 2013 (9th)
2013–14	Brady Clark	Sean Beighton	Phil Tilker	Darren Lehto			
2019–20	Joel Larway	Doug Kauffman	Darren Lehto	John Rasmussen			USSCC 2020 (gold)

=== Mixed ===
Season	Skip	Third	Second	Lead	Events
2004–05	Brady Clark	Cristin Clark	Darren Lehto	Bev Walter	USMxCC 2005 (gold)

== Personal life ==
Darren Lehto started curling in 1984 at the age of 16.

He moved from Canada to the United States in 1996 and became an American citizen in 1998.

He is employed as regional sales manager with RedBuilt.
