= Joel Larway =

American curler

- Curler ♂
- Born: May 14, 1968 (age 58); Columbus, Ohio, U.S.

Team
- Curling club: Granite CC, Seattle, WA

Curling career
- Member Association: United States
- World Championship: 3 (1992, 2001, 2004)
Medal record
Curling
World Championships
Bronze medal – third place	1992 Garmisch-Partenkirchen
United States Men's Championship
Gold medal – first place	1992 Grafton
Gold medal – first place	2001 Madison
Gold medal – first place	2004 Grand Forks
Silver medal – second place	1993 St. Paul
Bronze medal – third place	2006 Bemidji
Bronze medal – third place	2007 Utica
Bronze medal – third place	2008 Hibbing

Joel Larway (born May 14, 1968, in Columbus, Ohio, United States) is an American curler from Mukilteo, Washington.

He is a 1992 World Men's bronze medallist and a three-times United States men's curling champion (1992, 2001, 2004).

== Awards ==
- USA Curling Male Athlete of the Year: 2004.

== Teams ==
Season	Skip	Third	Second	Lead	Alternate	Coach	Events
1987–88	Jason Larway	Joel Larway	?	?			USJCC 1988 (silver)
1991–92	Doug Jones	Jason Larway	Joel Larway	Tom Violette			USMCC 1992 (gold); WCC 1992 (bronze)
1992–93	Jason Larway	Joel Larway	?	?			USMCC 1993 (silver)
1994–95	Jason Larway	Joel Larway	?	?			USMCC 1995 (???th)
1996–97	Pete Fenson	Jason Larway	Joel Larway	Eric Fenson			
1998–99	Jason Larway	Travis Way	Joel Larway	Tom Violette			
2000–01	Jason Larway	Greg Romaniuk	Travis Way	Joel Larway	Doug Kauffman	Jack McNelly	USMCC 2001 (gold); WCC 2001 (6th)
2001–02	Jason Larway	Craig Disher	Travis Way	Joel Larway	Doug Kauffman	Mike Hawkins	USOCT 2001 (7th)
2001–02	Jason Larway	Greg Romaniuk	Joel Larway	Doug Kauffman			USMCC 2002 (6th)
2002–03	Jason Larway	Joel Larway	Brady Clark	Ken Trask			USMCC 2003 (9th)
2003–04	Jason Larway	Doug Pottinger	Joel Larway	Bill Todhunter	Doug Kauffman	Don Pottinger	USMCC 2004 (gold); WCC 2004 (9th)
2004–05	Jason Larway	Doug Pottinger	Joel Larway	Bill Todhunter			CCC 2004 (gold); USOCT 2005 (7th)
2005–06	Brady Clark	Wes Johnson	Jason Larway	Joel Larway			USMCC 2006 (bronze)
2006–07	Jason Larway	Colin Hufman	Joel Larway	Steven Demlow			USMCC 2007 (bronze)
2007–08	Jason Larway	Colin Hufman	Greg Persinger	Joel Larway	Steven Demlow		USMCC 2008 (bronze)
2008–09	Jason Larway	Colin Hufman	Joel Larway	Bill Todhunter	Greg Johnson		
2010–11	Jason Larway	Colin Hufman	Sean Beighton	Joel Larway			USMCC 2011 (9th)
2011–12	Colin Hufman	Joel Larway	Steven Birklid	Kevin Johnson			
2012–13	Mark Johnson	Jason Larway	Joel Larway	Christopher Rimple			
2019–20	Joel Larway	Doug Kauffman	Darren Lehto	John Rasmussen			USSCC 2020 (gold)

== Personal life ==
His brother Jason is a curler too. The two brothers curled together for many years.
