= Granite Curling Club (Seattle) =

Only dedicated curling facility on the U.S. West Coast

- Location: 1440 North 128th Street; Seattle, Washington, U.S.

Information
- Established: 1961
- Club type: Dedicated ice
- USCA region: Pacific Northwest Curling Association
- Sheets of ice: Five
- Website: https://www.curlingseattle.org

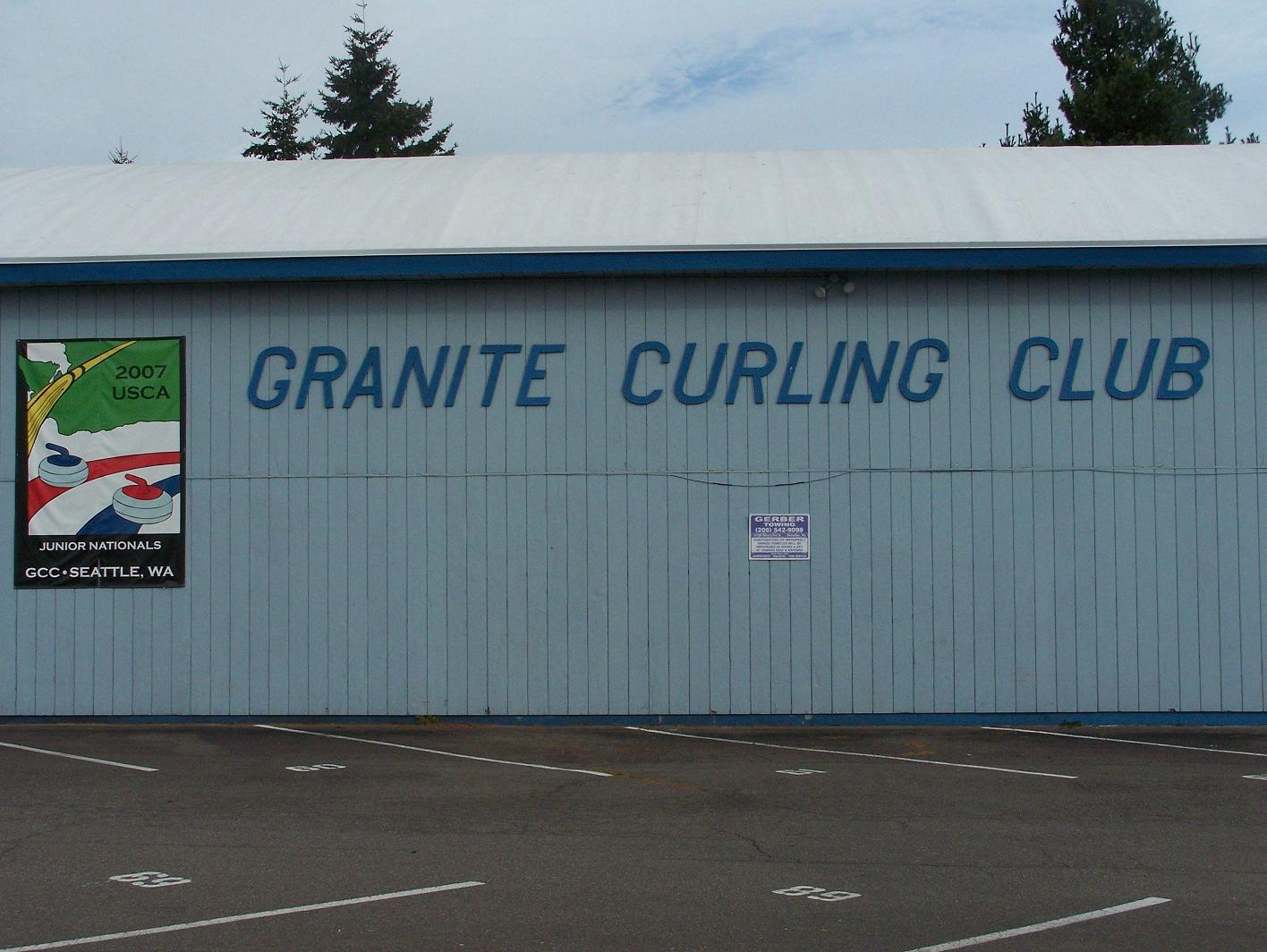
Granite Curling Club in Seattle

The Granite Curling Club is a curling organization in Seattle, Washington, United States. It is affiliated with the United States Curling Association and operates the only dedicated curling facility on the West Coast. The club's facility, in the Haller Lake neighborhood of north Seattle, was purpose-built and comprises five lanes. Since its founding in 1961, Granite Curling Club has produced more U.S. national championship teams than any other U.S. club.

== Most recent national championships ==
- Women's Championship - 1988 Nancy Langley rink
- Men's Championship - 2018 Greg Persinger rink
- Men's Juniors - 2020 Luc Violette rink
- Mixed National - 2016 Em Good rink
- Senior Women's - 2010 Sharon Vukich rink
- Mixed Doubles - 2012 Brady Clark and Cristin Clark
- Senior Men's - 2020 Joel Larway rink

== World Championship medals ==
Men's

- 1975 Silver Ed Risling rink
- 1967 Bronze Bruce Roberts rink
- 1961 Bronze Frank Crealock rink
- 1992 Bronze Doug Jones rink

Junior Men's

- 1981 Bronze Ted Purvis rink

Senior Men's

- 2015 Gold Lyle Sieg rink
