= 2007 BDO Classic Canadian Open (December) =

Grand Slam of Curling event

- Host city: Quebec City, Quebec
- Arena: Pavillon de la Jeunesse
- Dates: November 28 – December 2
- Winner: (Alberta) Kevin Martin
- Curling club: Saville SC, Edmonton
- Skip: Kevin Martin
- Third: John Morris
- Second: Marc Kennedy
- Lead: Ben Hebert
- Finalist: (Nova Scotia) Shawn Adams

The 2007 BDO Classic Canadian Open of December was held November 28 to December 2 at the Pavillon de la Jeunesse in Quebec City, Quebec. It was the second BDO Classic of the year, the first being held in January as part of the previous curling season.

== Teams ==
The teams are listed as follows:

Skip	Third	Second	Lead	Alternate
Shawn Adams	Paul Flemming	Craig Burgess	Kelly Mittlestadt	
Todd Birr	Bill Todhunter	Greg Johnson	Kevin Birr	
Kerry Burtnyk	Dan Kammerlock	Richard Daneault	Rob Meakin	
Peter Corner	John Base	Phil Loevenmark	Paul Moffatt	
Robert Desjardins	Jean-Sébastien Roy	Jean-François Charest	Maurice Cayouette	
David Nedohin (fourth)	Randy Ferbey (skip)	Scott Pfeifer	Marcel Rocque	
Martin Ferland	Marco Berthelot	Philippe Lemay	Christian Cantin	
Brad Gushue	Mark Nichols	Chris Schille	David Noftall	
Glenn Howard	Richard Hart	Brent Laing	Craig Savill	
Mark Johnson	Rob Bucholz	Glen Kennedy	Adam Enright	
Joel Jordison	Scott Bitz	Derek Owens	Dean Hicke	
Kevin Koe	Blake MacDonald	Carter Rycroft	Nolan Thiessen	
Brent Pierce (fourth)	Brent MacDonald (skip)	Warren Hassall	Brendan Melnyk	
Kevin Martin	John Morris	Marc Kennedy	Ben Hebert	
Wayne Middaugh	Jon Mead	Ian Tetley	Scott Bailey	
Pat Simmons	Jeff Sharp	Gerry Adam	Steve Laycock	Warren Jackson
Jeff Stoughton	Ryan Fry	Rob Fowler	Steve Gould	
Jim Cotter (fourth)	Bob Ursel (skip)	Kevin Folk	Rick Sawatsky	

== Round-robin standings ==
Final round-robin standings

Section A	W	L
(Alberta) Kevin Martin	4	1
(Quebec) Martin Ferland	4	1
(Manitoba) Jeff Stoughton	3	2
(Saskatchewan) Pat Simmons	2	3
(Alberta) Mark Johnson	2	3
(Alberta) Brent MacDonald	0	5

Section B	W	L
(Ontario) Glenn Howard	4	1
(Ontario) Wayne Middaugh	4	1
(Nova Scotia) Shawn Adams	3	2
(Newfoundland and Labrador) Brad Gushue	2	3
(Manitoba) Kerry Burtnyk	2	3
(United States) Todd Birr	0	5

Section C	W	L
(Alberta) Randy Ferbey	5	0
(Ontario) Peter Corner	3	2
(Alberta) Kevin Koe	2	3
(British Columbia) Bob Ursel	2	3
(Quebec) Robert Desjardins	2	3
(Saskatchewan) Joel Jordison	1	4

== Round-robin results ==
All draw times are listed in Eastern Standard Time.

=== Draw 1 ===
Wednesday, November 28

Team	Final
(Alberta) Kevin Martin	5
(Quebec) Martin Ferland	4

Team	Final
(Newfoundland and Labrador) Brad Gushue	8
(Nova Scotia) Shawn Adams	2

Team	Final
(Manitoba) Jeff Stoughton	6
(Alberta) Mark Johnson	5

Team	Final
(Ontario) Glenn Howard	7
(United States) Todd Birr	0

Team	Final
(Alberta) Randy Ferbey	9
(Quebec) Robert Desjardins	2

=== Draw 2 ===
Thursday, November 29

Team	Final
(Saskatchewan) Pat Simmons	7
(Alberta) Brent MacDonald	3

Team	Final
(Alberta) Peter Corner	6
(Alberta) Kevin Koe	3

Team	Final
(British Columbia) Bob Ursel	7
(Saskatchewan) Joel Jordison	3

Team	Final
(Ontario) Wayne Middaugh	6
(Manitoba) Kerry Burtnyk	5

Team	Final
(Nova Scotia) Shawn Adams	8
(United States) Todd Birr	3

=== Draw 3 ===
Thursday, November 29

Team	Final
(Alberta) Randy Ferbey	7
(Saskatchewan) Joel Jordison	2

Team	Final
(Alberta) Kevin Martin	6
(Alberta) Mark Johnson	5

Team	Final
(Alberta) Kevin Koe	7
(Quebec) Robert Desjardins	2

Team	Final
(Quebec) Martin Ferland	5
(Manitoba) Jeff Stoughton	3

Team	Final
(Ontario) Glenn Howard	10
(Newfoundland and Labrador) Brad Gushue	5

=== Draw 4 ===
Thursday, November 29

Team	Final
(Nova Scotia) Shawn Adams	8
(Manitoba) Kerry Burtnyk	6

Team	Final
(British Columbia) Bob Ursel	8
(Quebec) Robert Desjardins	7

Team	Final
(Ontario) Wayne Middaugh	6
(United States) Todd Birr	4

Team	Final
(Alberta) Mark Johnson	8
(Saskatchewan) Pat Simmons	3

Team	Final
(Quebec) Martin Ferland	6
(Alberta) Brent MacDonald	5

=== Draw 5 ===
Thursday, November 29

Team	Final
(Alberta) Kevin Koe	4
(British Columbia) Bob Ursel	3

Team	Final
(Ontario) Wayne Middaugh	5
(Ontario) Glenn Howard	4

Team	Final
(Manitoba) Kerry Burtnyk	6
(Newfoundland and Labrador) Brad Gushue	2

Team	Final
(Alberta) Randy Ferbey	5
(Alberta) Peter Corner	4

Team	Final
(Manitoba) Jeff Stoughton	7
(Alberta) Kevin Martin	1

=== Draw 6 ===
Friday, November 30

Team	Final
(Ontario) Wayne Middaugh	5
(Newfoundland and Labrador) Brad Gushue	2

Team	Final
(Quebec) Martin Ferland	6
(Saskatchewan) Pat Simmons	5

Team	Final
(Alberta) Mark Johnson	8
(Alberta) Brent MacDonald	1

Team	Final
(Saskatchewan) Joel Jordison	5
(Alberta) Kevin Koe	3

Team	Final
(Quebec) Robert Desjardins	6
(Alberta) Peter Corner	4

=== Draw 7 ===
Friday, November 30

Team	Final
(Saskatchewan) Pat Simmons	7
(Manitoba) Jeff Stoughton	3

Team	Final
(Manitoba) Kerry Burtnyk	7
(United States) Todd Birr	6

Team	Final
(Ontario) Glenn Howard	8
(Nova Scotia) Shawn Adams	7

Team	Final
(Alberta) Kevin Martin	7
(Alberta) Brent MacDonald	3

Team	Final
(Alberta) Randy Ferbey	6
(British Columbia) Bob Ursel	4

=== Draw 8 ===
Friday, November 30, 5:00 pm

Team	Final
(Quebec) Martin Ferland	8
(Alberta) Mark Johnson	5

Team	Final
(Alberta) Kevin Koe	4
(Alberta) Randy Ferbey	10

Team	Final
(Alberta) Peter Corner	9
(Saskatchewan) Joel Jordison	5

Team	Final
(Nova Scotia) Shawn Adams	7
(Ontario) Wayne Middaugh	5

Team	Final
(United States) Todd Birr	2
(Newfoundland and Labrador) Brad Gushue	6

=== Draw 9 ===
Friday, November 30, 8:00 pm

Team	Final
(Saskatchewan) Joel Jordison	4
(Quebec) Robert Desjardins	7

Team	Final
(Manitoba) Jeff Stoughton	4
(Alberta) Brent MacDonald	1

Team	Final
(Alberta) Kevin Martin	5
(Saskatchewan) Pat Simmons	3

Team	Final
(Alberta) Peter Corner	6
(British Columbia) Bob Ursel	5

Team	Final
(Ontario) Glenn Howard	6
(Manitoba) Kerry Burtnyk	2

== Playoffs ==
Quarterfinals
(Alberta) Kevin Martin	7
(Manitoba) Jeff Stoughton	4
(Quebec) Martin Ferland	6
(Ontario) Peter Corner	5
(Ontario) Wayne Middaugh	6
(Ontario) Glenn Howard	4
(Alberta) Randy Ferbey	7
(Nova Scotia) Shawn Adams	10

Semifinals
(Alberta) Kevin Martin	8
(Quebec) Martin Ferland	3
(Ontario) Wayne Middaugh	3
(Nova Scotia) Shawn Adams	6

Final
(Alberta) Kevin Martin	6
(Nova Scotia) Shawn Adams	2

== Money List ==
Place	Team	Money
1	Champion	$25,000
2	Runner-up	$18,000
3	Semifinalist	$12,000
5	Quarterfinalist	$7,000
