= Uli Sutor =

German curler and coach

- Curler ♂
- Born: 9 May 1960 (age 66)

Team
- Curling club: CC Füssen

Curling career
- Member Association: Germany
- World Championship: 3 (1986, 1989, 1998)
- European Championship: 2 (1986, 1991)
- Other appearances: European Mixed Curling Championship: 1 (2006), World Senior Curling Championships: 3 (2012, 2013, 2014)
Medal record
Curling
Representing Germany
European Championships
Gold medal – first place	1991 Chamonix

Ulrich "Uli" Sutor (born 9 May 1960) is a former German curler and curling coach.

He is a former European men's curling champion (1991), German men's curling champion (1989) and two-time German mixed curling champion (1989, 1990, silver in 1988, bronze in 1987).

== Awards and honours ==
- Collie Campbell Memorial Award: 1986.

== Teams ==
=== Men's ===
Season	Skip	Third	Second	Lead	Alternate	Coach	Events
1985–86	Roland Jentsch	Uli Sutor	Charlie Kapp	Thomas Vogelsang	Rudi Ibald	Otto Danieli	WCC 1986 (9th)
1986–87	Roland Jentsch	Uli Sutor	Charlie Kapp	Thomas Vogelsang			ECC 1986 (6th); WCC CR 1986 (gold)
1988–89	Roland Jentsch	Uli Sutor	Charlie Kapp	Thomas Vogelsang	Andy Kapp		WCC 1989 (8th)
1991–92	Roland Jentsch	Uli Sutor	Charlie Kapp	Alexander Huchel	Uli Kapp		ECC 1991 (gold)
1997–98	Roland Jentsch	Uli Sutor	Florian Zörgiebel	Andreas Kempf	Alexander Huchel	Keith Wendorf	WCC 1998 (10th)
2003–04	Sebastian Stock	Christoph Falk	Patrick Hoffman	Uli Sutor			
2011–12	Rainer Schöpp	Christoph Falk	Uli Sutor	Karl Stiller	Adolf Geiselhart		WSCC 2012 (11th)
2012–13	Klaus Unterstab	Uli Sutor	Lenard Schulze	Matthias Steiner	Andreas Helwig		WSCC 2013 (19th)
2013–14	Rainer Schöpp	Jamie Boutin	Uli Sutor	Karl Stiller	Adolf Geiselhart		WSCC 2014 (10th)

=== Mixed ===
Season	Skip	Third	Second	Lead	Alternate	Events
1988–89	Uli Sutor	Angelika Schäffer	Charlie Kapp	Alexandra Natterer		GMxCC 1989 (gold)
1989–90	Uli Sutor	Suzanne Fink	Charlie Kapp	Gisela Ibald		GMxCC 1990 (gold)
2006–07	Roland Jentsch	Daniela Jentsch	Uli Sutor	Marika Trettin	Helmar Erlewein	EMxCC 2006 (10th)

== Record as a coach of national teams ==
Year	Tournament, event	National team	Place
2002	2002 European Curling Championships	Germany (men)	1st place, gold medalist(s)
2003	2003 European Curling Championships	Germany (men)	6
2004	2004 World Men's Curling Championship	Germany (men)	2nd place, silver medalist(s)
