= 2011 Green Bay Cash Spiel =

World Curling Tour

- Host city: Green Bay, Wisconsin
- Arena: Green Bay Curling Club
- Dates: September 23–25
- Winner: (China) Liu Rui
- Curling club: Harbin, China
- Skip: Liu Rui
- Third: Zang Jialiang
- Second: Xu Xiaoming
- Lead: Ba Dexin
- Finalist: (Minnesota) Mike Farbelow

The 2011 Green Bay Cash Spiel was a bonspiel, or curling tournament, that took place at the Green Bay Curling Club in Green Bay, Wisconsin. The tournament was held as a triple-knockout format. The tournament was established in 2011 as a part of the World Curling Tour, the Ontario Curling Tour, and the Great Lakes Curling Tour.

== Teams ==
Skip	Third	Second	Lead	Locale
Josh Bahr	Chris Bond	Atticus Wallace	John Muller	Bemidji, Minnesota
Todd Birr	Greg Romaniuk	Doug Pottinger	Tom O'Connor	Mankato, Minnesota
Craig Brown	Matt Hamilton	Kroy Nernberger	Derrick Casper	Madison, Wisconsin
Steve Day (fourth)	John Benton (skip)	Dan Wiza	Jeff Kuemmel	Madison, Wisconsin
Mike Farbelow	Kevin Deeren	Kraig Deeren	Tim Solin	Minneapolis, Minnesota
Eric Fenson	Trevor Andrews	Quentin Way	Mark Lazar	Bemidji, Minnesota
Rebecca Hamilton				Madison, Wisconsin
Eric Harnden	Clint Cudmore	Brady Barnett	Marc Barette	Sault Ste. Marie, Ontario
Mark Hartman				Madison, Wisconsin
Liu Rui	Zang Jialiang	Xu Xiaoming	Ba Dexin	Harbin, China
Blake Morton	Marcus Fonger	Tommy Jusczcyk	Calvin Weber	McFarland, Wisconsin
Paul Pustovar	Nick Myers	Andy Jukich	Jeff Puleo	Hibbing, Minnesota
Matt Sandquist	Steven Kawleski	Jeremy Stubbe	Preston Waala	Wisconsin
John Shuster	Zach Jacobson	Jared Zezel	John Landsteiner	Duluth, Minnesota
Peter Stolt	Jerod Roland	Brad Caldwell	Erik Ordway	St. Paul, Minnesota
Bill Todhunter	Ryan Meyer	Nik Geller	Craig LaBrec	Appleton, Wisconsin

== Knockout results ==
=== A event ===
First Knockout		Semifinals		Qualifier 1
(China) Liu Rui	9
(Wisconsin) Rebecca Hamilton	2	(China) Liu Rui	7
(Minnesota) Paul Pustovar	7	(Minnesota) Paul Pustovar	2
(Minnesota) Eric Fenson	5			(China) Liu Rui	6
(Minnesota) John Shuster	5			(Minnesota) Mike Farbelow	1
(Minnesota) Peter Stolt	6	(Minnesota) Peter Stolt	2
(Minnesota) Mike Farbelow	10	(Minnesota) Mike Farbelow	6
(Wisconsin) Sandquist	1

First Knockout		Semifinals		Qualifier 2
(Wisconsin) Craig Brown	8
(Wisconsin) Mark Hartman	2	(Wisconsin) Craig Brown	4
(Minnesota) Josh Bahr	4	(Wisconsin) Blake Morton	8
(Wisconsin) Blake Morton	5			(Wisconsin) Blake Morton	7
(Ontario) Eric Harnden	10			(Minnesota) Todd Birr	2
(Wisconsin) John Benton	6	(Ontario) Eric Harnden	2
(Minnesota) Todd Birr	6	(Minnesota) Todd Birr	6
(Wisconsin) Bill Todhunter	3

=== B event ===
Second Knockout		Semifinals		Qualifier 3
(Wisconsin) Rebecca Hamilton	7
(Minnesota) Eric Fenson	8	(Minnesota) Eric Fenson	5
(Minnesota) John Shuster	11	(Minnesota) John Shuster	6
(Wisconsin) Sandquist	3			(Minnesota) John Shuster	3
				(Minnesota) Mike Farbelow	4

Second Knockout		Semifinals		Qualifier 4
(Wisconsin) Mark Hartman	7
(Minnesota) Josh Bahr	0	(Wisconsin) Mark Hartman	6
(Wisconsin) John Benton	8	(Wisconsin) John Benton	11
(Wisconsin) Bill Todhunter	5			(Wisconsin) John Benton	1
				(Minnesota) Todd Birr	6

Second Knockout		Qualifier 5
(Minnesota) Paul Pustovar	0
(Minnesota) Peter Stolt	7	(Minnesota) Peter Stolt	4
(Wisconsin) Craig Brown	10	(Wisconsin) Craig Brown	8
(Ontario) Eric Harnden	6

=== C event ===
Third Knockout		Semifinals		Qualifier 6
(Wisconsin) Rebecca Hamilton	2
(Wisconsin) Sandquist	9	(Wisconsin) Sandquist	7
		(Ontario) Eric Harnden	0
				(Wisconsin) Sandquist	1
				(Wisconsin) John Benton	7

Third Knockout		Semifinals		Qualifier 7
(Minnesota) Josh Bahr	8
(Wisconsin) Bill Todhunter	2	(Minnesota) Josh Bahr	8
		(Minnesota) Paul Pustovar	0
				(Minnesota) Josh Bahr	L
				(Minnesota) John Shuster	W

Third Knockout		Qualifier 8
(Minnesota) Eric Fenson	8
(Wisconsin) Mark Hartman	4	(Minnesota) Eric Fenson	W
		(Minnesota) Peter Stolt	L

== Playoffs ==
Quarterfinals
(Wisconsin) Blake Morton	8
(Wisconsin) John Benton	4
(Minnesota) John Shuster	5
(Minnesota) Mike Farbelow	6
(Minnesota) Eric Fenson	2
(China) Liu Rui	9
(Minnesota) Todd Birr	7
(Wisconsin) Craig Brown	5

Semifinals
(Wisconsin) Blake Morton	1
(Minnesota) Mike Farbelow	6
(China) Liu Rui	7
(Minnesota) Todd Birr	3

Final
(Minnesota) Mike Farbelow	3
(China) Liu Rui	9
