= Roland Jentsch =

German curler

- Curler ♂

Team
- Curling club: CC Füssen

Curling career
- Member Association: Germany
- World Championship: 3 (1986, 1989, 1998)
- European Championship: 2 (1986, 1991)
- Other appearances: European Mixed Curling Championship: 1 (2006)
Medal record
Curling
Representing Germany
European Championships
Gold medal – first place	1991 Chamonix

Roland Jentsch is a former German curler.

He is a former European men's curling champion (1991) and two-time German men's curling champion (1989, 1998; silver in 1988; bronze in 1991, 1996).

His two daughters Daniela Jentsch and Analena Jentsch are well-known German curlers too.

== Teams ==
=== Men's ===
Season	Skip	Third	Second	Lead	Alternate	Coach	Events
1978–79	Roland Jentsch	Hans-Joachim Burba	Wolfgang Burba	Werner Kolb			WJCC 1979 (10th)
1985–86	Roland Jentsch	Uli Sutor	Charlie Kapp	Thomas Vogelsang	Rudi Ibald	Otto Danieli	WCC 1986 (9th)
1986–87	Roland Jentsch	Uli Sutor	Charlie Kapp	Thomas Vogelsang			ECC 1986 (6th); WCC CR 1986 (gold)
1988–89	Roland Jentsch	Uli Sutor	Charlie Kapp	Thomas Vogelsang	Andy Kapp		WCC 1989 (8th)
1991–92	Roland Jentsch	Uli Sutor	Charlie Kapp	Alexander Huchel	Uli Kapp		ECC 1991 (gold)
1997–98	Roland Jentsch	Uli Sutor	Florian Zörgiebel	Andreas Kempf	Alexander Huchel	Keith Wendorf	WCC 1998 (10th)

=== Mixed ===
Season	Skip	Third	Second	Lead	Alternate	Events
2006–07	Roland Jentsch	Daniela Jentsch	Uli Sutor	Marika Trettin	Helmar Erlewein	EMxCC 2006 (10th)
