= Charlie Kapp =

German curler

- Curler ♂

Team
- Curling club: EV Füssen

Curling career
- Member Association: Germany
- World Championship: 2 (1986, 1989)
- European Championship: 2 (1986, 1991)
- Other appearances: World Senior Curling Championships: 4 (2002, 2003, 2004, 2011)
Medal record
Curling
Representing Germany
European Championships
Gold medal – first place	1991 Chamonix
German Men's Championship
Gold medal – first place	1989
German Mixed Championship
Gold medal – first place	1989
Gold medal – first place	1990

Charlie Kapp is a former German curler.

He is a former European men's curling champion (1991), German men's curling champion (1989) and two-time German mixed curling champion (1989, 1990).

His sons Andy Kapp and Uli Kapp are well-known German curlers too.

== Teams ==
=== Men's ===
Season	Skip	Third	Second	Lead	Alternate	Coach	Events
1985–86	Roland Jentsch	Uli Sutor	Charlie Kapp	Thomas Vogelsang	Rudi Ibald	Otto Danieli	WCC 1986 (9th)
1986–87	Roland Jentsch	Uli Sutor	Charlie Kapp	Thomas Vogelsang			ECC 1986 (6th); WCC CR 1986 (gold)
1988–89	Roland Jentsch	Uli Sutor	Charlie Kapp	Thomas Vogelsang	Andy Kapp		WCC 1989 (8th)
1991–92	Roland Jentsch	Uli Sutor	Charlie Kapp	Alexander Huchel	Uli Kapp		ECC 1991 (gold)
2001–02	Charlie Kapp	Karl-Dieter Schäfer	Anton Grief	Rudi Ibald	Klaus Unterstab		WSCC 2002 (4th)
2002–03	Charlie Kapp	Karl-Dieter Schäfer	Anton Grief	Rudi Ibald	Klaus Unterstab		WSCC 2003 (4th)
2003–04	Charlie Kapp	Karl-Dieter Schäfer	Anton Grief	Rudi Ibald	Klaus Unterstab	Beat Grimm	WSCC 2004 (6th)
2010–11	Klaus Unterstab	Lenard Schulze	Charlie Kapp	Andreas Helwig	Karl-Dieter Schäfer	Beat Grimm	WSCC 2011 (9th)

=== Mixed ===
Season	Skip	Third	Second	Lead	Events
1988–89	Uli Sutor	Angelika Schäffer	Charlie Kapp	Alexandra Natterer	GMxCC 1989 (gold)
1989–90	Uli Sutor	Suzanne Fink	Charlie Kapp	Gisela Ibald	GMxCC 1990 (gold)
