= 2007 Continental Cup of Curling =

- Host city: Medicine Hat, Alberta
- Arena: Medicine Hat Arena
- Dates: December 13-16
- Attendance: 26,810
- Winner: Team North America
Score Breakdown
Discipline	NA	Europe
Mixed Doubles Round 1	18	0
Women's Team Round 1	12	6
Men's Team Round 1	6	12
Women's Team Round 2	12	6
Singles	28	4
Men's Team Round 2	6	12
Skins A	46	14
Mixed Doubles Round 2	9	9
Skins B	73	17
Women's Skins C	33	22
Men's Skins C	47	8
Total	290	110

The 2007 Continental Cup of Curling was held at the Medicine Hat Arena in Medicine Hat, Alberta on December 13-16. North America won its third title, defeating Team Europe 290-110.

== Format ==
The Continental Cup involves four disciplines within the sport, each worth a designated number of points - Team Games (72 points), Mixed Doubles (36 points), Singles (32 points) and Skins Games (260 points). The first side to score 201 points is declared the winner. Each member of the winning side receives $2,000, while the losing side members get $1,400 each from the $88,400 total purse.

The revised Mixed Doubles format involved only two players per team, instead of the previous four (two throwers and two sweepers), who also become sweepers during the eight-end games. Each team throws five rocks per end, with two stationary stones placed before each end, one in the house and one in front.

== Teams ==
Team	Country	Home	Skip	Third	Second	Lead
Europe	Scotland/Sweden	Lockerbie	David Murdoch	Niklas Edin	Peter Smith	Euan Byers
Europe	Germany	Füssen	Andy Kapp	Andy Lang	Holger Höhne	Andreas Kempf
Europe	Switzerland	Baden-Dättwil	Andreas Schwaller	Ralph Stöckli	Thomas Lips	Damian Grichting
Europe	Denmark	Tårnby	Angelina Jensen	Madeleine Dupont	Denise Dupont	Camilla Jensen
Europe	Scotland	Stirling	Kelly Wood	Jackie Lockhart	Lorna Vevers	Lindsay Wood
Europe	Russia	Moscow	Liudmila Privivkova	Olga Jarkova	Nkeiruka Ezekh	Ekaterina Galkina
North; America	Canada	Coldwater	Glenn Howard	Richard Hart	Brent Laing	Craig Savill
North; America	Canada	Edmonton	David Nedohin	Randy Ferbey	Scott Pfeifer	Marcel Rocque
North; America	United States	Mankato	Todd Birr	Bill Todhunter	Greg Johnson	Kevin Birr
North; America	Canada	Kelowna	Kelly Scott	Jeanna Schraeder	Sasha Carter	Renee Simons
North; America	Canada	Winnipeg	Jennifer Jones	Cathy Overton-Clapham	Jill Officer	Dawn Askin
North; America	United States	Madison	Debbie McCormick	Allison Pottinger	Nicole Joraanstad	Natalie Nicholson

== Broadcast ==
The final women's and men's skins games were broadcast on CBC.

== Results ==
=== Mixed doubles ===
==== Round 1 ====
December 13, 9:30

Team	Final	Points
Europe (Wood/Stöckli)	4	0
North America (McCormick/Pfeifer)	10	6

Team	Final	Points
Europe (Jarkova/Schwaller)	6	0
North America (Overton-Clapham/Birr)	7	6

Team	Final	Points
Europe (Privivkova/Murdoch)	6	0
North America (Jones/Todhunter)	10	6

==== Round 2 ====
December 15, 16:00

Team	Final	Points
Europe (Lockhart/Edin)	6	0
North America (Howard/Schraeder)	8	6

Team	Final	Points
Europe (Lang/Vevers)	7	3
North America (Hart/Carter)	7	3

Team	Final	Points
Europe (Kapp/Dupont)	4	6
North America (Nedohin/Pottinger)	3	0

=== Women's team ===
==== Round 1 ====
December 13, 14:00

Team	Final	Points
Europe (Privivkova)	5	0
North America (Jones)	6	6

Team	Final	Points
Europe (Wood)	8	6
North America (Scott)	6	0

Team	Final	Points
Europe (Jensen)	3	0
North America (McCormick)	8	6

==== Round 2 ====
December 14, 9:30

Team	Final	Points
Europe (Jensen)	3	0
North America (McCormick)	11	6

Team	Final	Points
Europe (Wood)	4	0
North America (Scott)	5	6

Team	Final	Points
Europe (Privivkova)	6	6
North America (Jones)	5	0

=== Men's team ===
==== Round 1 ====
December 13, 18:30

Team	Final	Points
Europe (Kapp)	5	6
North America (Ferbey)	3	0

Team	Final	Points
Europe (Murdoch)	2	0
North America (Howard)	8	6

Team	Final	Points
Europe (Schwaller)	4	6
North America (Birr)	2	0

==== Round 2 ====
December 14, 18:30

Team	Final	Points
Europe (Murdoch)	4	0
North America (Ferbey)	7	6

Team	Final	Points
Europe (Kapp)	5	6
North America (Birr)	4	0

Team	Final	Points
Europe (Schwaller)	5	6
North America (Howard)	4	0

=== Singles ===
December 14, 14:00

Team	Total	Points
Europe (Privivkova)	6	0
North America (McCormick)	16	4

Team	Total	Points
Europe (Jensen)	19	4
North America (Scott)	15	0

Team	Total	Points
Europe (Wood)	11	0
North America (Jones)	26	4

Team	Total	Points
Europe (Murdoch)	19	0
North America (Ferbey)	24	4

Team	Total	Points
Europe (Kapp)	18	0
North America (Birr)	21	4

Team	Total	Points
Europe (Schwaller)	19	0
North America (Howard)	26	4

Points: Europe 4–28 North America after bonus of 8 points to North America

=== Skins ===
==== "A" Competition ====
December 15, 11:30

Mixed

Team	Points
Europe (Galkina/Lang/Wood/Murdoch)	1
North America (Nedohin)	19

Women

Team	Points
Europe (Jensen)	8
North America (Jones)	12

Men

Team	Points
Europe (Schwaller)	5
North America (Birr)	15

==== "B" Competition ====
December 15, 19:30

Team	Points
Europe (Schwaller)	6
North America (Howard)	24

Team	Points
Europe (Privivkova)	1
North America (McCormick)	29

Team	1	2	3	4	5	6	7	8	Points
Europe	X		0		X		X		10
North America		0		X		X		X	20

==== "C" Competition ====
Women

December 16, 10:30

Team	1	2	3	4	5	6	7	8	Points
Europe (Wood)	X		0			X	X		22
North America (Scott)		X		0	X			X	33

Men

December 16, 11:30

Team	1	2	3	4	5	6	7	8	Points
Europe (Murdoch)	0	X							8
North America (Howard)			X	X	X	X	X	X	47
