= 2011 United States Men's Curling Championship qualifiers =

The 2011 United States Men's Curling Championship qualifiers took place during January at various locations throughout the nation. Prior to the national finals, the number of entrants was pared down to ten teams through regional qualifiers and then a challenge round.

Teams qualified for the men's nationals in one of two ways. Two teams automatically qualified as the top two US teams on the Order of Merit list after the Curl Mesabi Cash Spiel was completed. This year, those two teams were the Pete Fenson and Tyler George rinks.

The remaining eight spots for the nationals were awarded to the top finishers in the regional qualifiers and challenge rounds. Five teams qualified from the qualifiers round, where each qualified site received one or more qualifying spots. The other three spots went to the winners of the challenge round.

== Regional qualifiers ==
This year, there were three regional qualifiers, which will take place in Medford, Wisconsin, Bismarck, North Dakota, and Rochester, New York. The qualifiers will take place from January 5–9. A total of 29 teams (not including the Fenson rink or the George rink) participated in the qualifiers.

The qualifiers either were held using a round-robin format or a knockout format of play. The double knockout provision, which states that a team is eliminated from qualifying for the nationals if the team has at least two losses in their win-loss record, was in place for all three qualifiers. If there are teams with less than two losses, they will play each other until the number of teams still able to qualify matches the number of qualification spots available.

The qualifier scheduled in Seattle, Washington was cancelled because there were not enough teams to meet the minimum five teams that need to sign up for a qualifier in order for it to take place. Two teams transferred to other qualifiers, while two other teams dropped.

Key
Teams to Nationals (Fargo)
Teams to challenge round (Waupaca)

=== Medford qualifier ===
The Medford qualifier was held in a round robin format with eight teams competing for the top spot. Two teams qualified directly to the nationals in Fargo, while three teams qualified to the Challenge Round in Waupaca.

==== Teams ====
Skip	Locale
Todd Birr	(Minnesota) Mankato
Craig Brown	(Wisconsin) Madison
Matt Carlson	(Minnesota) Mankato
Brady Clark	(Washington (state)) Seattle
Geoff Goodland	(Wisconsin) Eau Claire
Blake Morton	(Wisconsin) McFarland
Kroy Nernberger	(Wisconsin) Madison
Paul Pustovar	(Wisconsin) Madison

Berth	Brown	Goodl.	Birr	Clark	Nern.	Pust.	Mort.	Carls.	W	L
(Wisconsin) Craig Brown	-	6-3	9-7	7-8	9-7	9-6	8-5	11-3	6	1
(Wisconsin) Geoff Goodland	3-6	-	4-5	7-4	9-3	8-7	9-7	9-6	5	2
(Minnesota) Todd Birr	7-9	5-4	-	8-10	8-3	0-8	3-6	3-9	5	2
(Washington (state)) Brady Clark	8-7	4-7	10-8	-	2-7	7-5	11-0	10-1	4	3
(Wisconsin) Kroy Nernberger	7-9	3-9	3-8	7-2	-	7-6	5-4	9-1	4	3
(Wisconsin) Paul Pustovar	6-9	7-8	8-0	5-7	6-7	-	10-0	8-5	3	4
(Wisconsin) Blake Morton	5-8	7-9	6-3	0-11	4-5	0-10	-	9-7	1	6
(Minnesota) Matt Carlson	3-11	6-9	9-3	1-10	1-9	5-8	7-9	-	0	7

=== Bismarck qualifier ===
The Bismarck qualifier was held in a knockout format. Eleven teams participated in this qualifier. Two teams qualified directly to the nationals in Fargo, while four teams qualified to the Challenge Round.

==== Teams ====
Skip	Locale
John Benton	(Minnesota) St. Paul
Ryan Berg	(North Dakota) West Fargo
Craig Disher	(North Dakota) Rolla
Mike Farbelow	(Minnesota) St. Paul
Zach Jacobson	(North Dakota) Langdon
Dave Jensen	(North Dakota) Bismarck
Travis Kitchens	(North Dakota) Devils Lake
Jason Larway	(Washington (state)) Seattle
Jerod Roland	(North Dakota) Minot
Owen Sampson	(North Dakota) Edmore
Matt Stevens	Minnesota

==== Results ====
A Event
(North Dakota) Jerod Roland	10
(North Dakota) Travis Kitchens	4
(North Dakota) Owen Sampson	8
(North Dakota) Ryan Berg	1
(North Dakota) Zach Jacobson	9
(North Dakota) Dave Jensen	7

Quarterfinals
(North Dakota) Jerod Roland	1
(North Dakota) Craig Disher	8
(Minnesota) Matt Stevens	4
(Minnesota) John Benton	8
(North Dakota) Owen Sampson	4
(Washington (state)) Jason Larway	9
(North Dakota) Zach Jacobson	8
(Minnesota) Mike Farbelow	6

Semifinals
(North Dakota) Craig Disher	9
(Minnesota) John Benton	4
(Washington (state)) Jason Larway	10
(North Dakota) Zach Jacobson	11

Finals
(North Dakota) Craig Disher	10
(North Dakota) Zach Jacobson	6

B Event
(North Dakota) Ryan Berg	10
(North Dakota) Dave Jensen	9

B Event
(North Dakota) Travis Kitchens	2
(Minnesota) Mike Farbelow	9
(Minnesota) Matt Stevens	8
(North Dakota) Ryan Berg	0

Round of 16
(Minnesota) Mike Farbelow	11
(North Dakota) Owen Sampson	2
(Minnesota) Matt Stevens	4
(North Dakota) Jerod Roland	8

Quarterfinals
(Minnesota) Mike Farbelow	10
(Minnesota) John Benton	4
(North Dakota) Jerod Roland	2
(Washington (state)) Jason Larway	7

Semifinals
(North Dakota) Zach Jacobson	6
(Minnesota) Mike Farbelow	7
(North Dakota) Craig Disher	7
(Washington (state)) Jason Larway	9

Finals
(Minnesota) Mike Farbelow	4
(Washington (state)) Jason Larway	7

C Event (1)		Quarterfinals		Semifinals		Finals
						(Washington (state)) Jason Larway	8
						(North Dakota) Zach Jacobson	4
		(North Dakota) Jerod Roland	1
(North Dakota) Ryan Berg	1	(North Dakota) Owen Sampson	9
(North Dakota) Owen Sampson	8			(North Dakota) Owen Sampson	6
				(North Dakota) Zach Jacobson	9

C Event (2)
(North Dakota) Travis Kitchens	8
(North Dakota) Dave Jensen	9

Round of 16
(North Dakota) Dave Jensen	4
(Minnesota) Matt Stevens	9

Quarterfinals
(Minnesota) John Benton	8
(Minnesota) Matt Stevens	3

Semifinals
(Minnesota) John Benton	5
(North Dakota) Craig Disher	9

Final
(Minnesota) Mike Farbelow	6
(North Dakota) Craig Disher	9

=== Rochester qualifier ===
The Rochester qualifier was also held in a knockout format. Ten teams participated in this qualifier. Only one team was able to qualify directly to the nationals, and one team moved on to the Challenge Round.

==== Teams ====
Key
Team to Nationals
Team to Challenge Round

Skip	Locale
Joseph Calabrese	(New York (state)) Rochester
Brandon Corbett	(New York (state)) Rochester
Scott Edie	(Maryland) Laurel
Gregory Eigner	(Indiana) Fort Wayne
Alex Leichter	(Massachusetts) Wayland
Dan Machold	(New York (state)) Schenectady
Heath McCormick	(New York (state)) New York
Clark Raven	(New York (state)) Rochester
Rick Van Cuyck*	(New York (state)) Rochester
Bryan Wight	(New York (state)) Canandaigua

*Due to injuries, the Van Cuyck rink withdrew prior to the start of the competition

==== Results ====
A Event
(New York (state)) Joe Calabrese	6
(New York (state)) Dan Machold	7

Quarterfinals
(New York (state)) Dan Machold	3
(New York (state)) Heath McCormick	12
(Maryland) Scott Edie	9
(New York (state)) Brandon Corbett	6
(New York (state)) Bryan Wight	7
(New York (state)) Clark Raven	6
(Indiana) Greg Eigner	7
(Massachusetts) Alexander Leichter	6

Semifinals
(New York (state)) Heath McCormick	9
(Maryland) Scott Edie	1
(New York (state)) Bryan Wight	8
(Indiana) Greg Eigner	1

Finals
(New York (state)) Heath McCormick	7
(New York (state)) Bryan Wight	5

B Event
(New York (state)) Joe Calabrese	8
(New York (state)) Brandon Corbett	4

Round of 16
(New York (state)) Joe Calabrese	3
(New York (state)) Clark Raven	7
(Massachusetts) Alexander Leichter	10
(New York (state)) Dan Machold	4

Quarterfinals
(New York (state)) Clark Raven	2
(Maryland) Scott Edie	5
(Massachusetts) Alexander Leichter	6
(Indiana) Greg Eigner	5

Semifinals
(New York (state)) Bryan Wight	9
(Maryland) Scott Edie	8
(New York (state)) Heath McCormick	7
(Massachusetts) Alexander Leichter	3

Finals
(New York (state)) Bryan Wight	8
(New York (state)) Heath McCormick	6

C Event (1)
(New York (state)) Brandon Corbett	12
(New York (state)) Dan Machold	5

Quarterfinals
(New York (state)) Clark Raven	2
(New York (state)) Brandon Corbett	7

Semifinals
(New York (state)) Brandon Corbett	8
(Massachusetts) Alexander Leichter	7

Finals
(New York (state)) Brandon Corbett	10
(New York (state)) Bryan Wight	8

C Event (2)	Quarterfinals		Semifinals		Finals
					(New York (state)) Heath McCormick	8
					(Maryland) Scott Edie	5
	(New York (state)) Joe Calabrese	5
	(Indiana) Greg Eigner	8
			(Indiana) Greg Eigner	3
			(Maryland) Scott Edie	10

Playoffs		Finals
		(New York (state)) Heath McCormick	7
(New York (state)) Bryan Wight	9	(New York (state)) Bryan Wight	5
(New York (state)) Brandon Corbett	3

== Challenge round ==
The challenge round took place in Waupaca, Wisconsin from January 19–23. Up to ten teams qualified for the challenge round; up to eight teams that didn't qualify for the finals from the regionals but placed well in the regionals qualified, and up to two teams qualified if they were among the top ten US Order of Merit teams and did not qualify for the finals or challenge round after the regionals. These teams played in a round robin format for three spots in the nationals.

=== Teams ===
Skip	Third	Second	First	Locale
John Benton	Peter Stolt	Jeffrey Puleo	Erik Ordway	(Minnesota) St. Paul
Todd Birr	Greg Romaniuk	Doug Pottinger	Kevin Birr	(Minnesota) Mankato
Mike Farbelow	Eric Fenson	Nick Myers	Aaron Nunberg	(Minnesota) St. Paul
Zach Jacobson	Kevin Deeren	Zane Jacobson	Kraig Deeren	(North Dakota) Langdon
Kroy Nernberger	Ryan Lemke	Jake Will	Steve Day	(Wisconsin) Madison
Paul Pustovar*	Jeremy Roe	Matt Hamilton	Patrick Roe	(Wisconsin) Madison
Owen Sampson	Ned Sampson	Tucker Smith	Kyle Young	(North Dakota) Edmore
Bryan Wight	Michael Moore	Joel Dietz	Mark Lazar	(New York (state)) Canandaigua

*Qualified based on Order of Merit standings
Note: Brady Clark (WA) has chosen to withdraw from the Challenge Round.

=== Results ===
Key
Teams to Nationals

Berth	W	L
(Minnesota) Todd Birr	5	1
(North Dakota) Zach Jacobson	5	1
(Wisconsin) Paul Pustovar	4	3
(Minnesota) John Benton	3	4
(Minnesota) Mike Farbelow	3	4
(Wisconsin) Kroy Nernberger	3	4
(North Dakota) Owen Sampson	2	5
(New York (state)) Bryan Wight	2	5

==== Draw 1 ====
Thursday, January 20, 2:00 pm

Sheet A	1	2	3	4	5	6	7	8	9	10	Final
(Wisconsin) Kroy Nernberger	0	1	0	1	0	1	2	2	0	0	7
(Wisconsin) Paul Pustovar	1	0	1	0	2	0	0	0	1	1	6

Sheet B	1	2	3	4	5	6	7	8	9	10	Final
(Minnesota) Mike Farbelow	0	0	0	0	1	0	1	0	X	X	2
(North Dakota) Owen Sampson	2	1	1	3	0	1	0	1	X	X	9

Sheet C	1	2	3	4	5	6	7	8	9	10	11	Final
(Minnesota) John Benton	0	0	1	0	0	1	0	1	0	1	0	4
(North Dakota) Zach Jacobson	0	1	0	0	1	0	0	0	2	0	1	5

Sheet D	1	2	3	4	5	6	7	8	9	10	Final
(Minnesota) Todd Birr	2	0	2	2	3	X	X	X	X	X	9
(New York (state)) Bryan Wight	0	2	0	0	0	X	X	X	X	X	2

==== Draw 2 ====
Thursday, January 20, 7:00 pm

Sheet A	1	2	3	4	5	6	7	8	9	10	Final
(North Dakota) Zach Jacobson	0	0	2	0	1	0	7	X	X	X	10
(New York (state)) Bryan Wight	0	0	0	1	0	2	0	X	X	X	3

Sheet B	1	2	3	4	5	6	7	8	9	10	Final
(Minnesota) John Benton	0	0	0	2	1	1	1	1	X	X	6
(Minnesota) Todd Birr	0	0	1	0	0	0	0	0	X	X	1

Sheet C	1	2	3	4	5	6	7	8	9	10	Final
(Minnesota) Mike Farbelow	1	1	0	2	2	3	X	X	X	X	9
(Wisconsin) Kroy Nernberger	0	0	2	0	0	0	X	X	X	X	2

Sheet D	1	2	3	4	5	6	7	8	9	10	Final
(North Dakota) Owen Sampson	0	3	0	0	1	0	1	X	X	X	5
(Wisconsin) Paul Pustovar	2	0	4	2	0	2	0	X	X	X	10

==== Draw 3 ====
Friday, January 21, 1:00 pm

Sheet A	1	2	3	4	5	6	7	8	9	10	Final
(Minnesota) John Benton	0	1	0	2	0	0	2	0	1	0	6
(Minnesota) Mike Farbelow	1	0	1	0	0	1	0	2	0	2	7

Sheet B	1	2	3	4	5	6	7	8	9	10	Final
(Wisconsin) Paul Pustovar	0	0	2	0	5	1	X	X	X	X	8
(New York (state)) Bryan Wight	0	0	0	1	0	0	X	X	X	X	1

Sheet C	1	2	3	4	5	6	7	8	9	10	Final
(North Dakota) Zach Jacobson	2	0	1	0	0	2	0	2	0	2	9
(North Dakota) Owen Sampson	0	2	0	2	0	0	0	1	0	0	8

Sheet D	1	2	3	4	5	6	7	8	9	10	Final
(Wisconsin) Kroy Nernberger	0	0	0	1	1	0	2	0	4	X	8
(Minnesota) Todd Birr	0	0	1	0	0	3	0	1	0	X	5

==== Draw 4 ====
Friday, January 21, 7:00 pm

Sheet A	1	2	3	4	5	6	7	8	9	10	Final
(New York (state)) Bryan Wight	1	0	1	0	0	1	1	0	1	1	6
(North Dakota) Owen Sampson	0	2	0	2	0	0	0	1	0	0	5

Sheet B	1	2	3	4	5	6	7	8	9	10	Final
(Wisconsin) Kroy Nernberger	0	0	0	1	1	0	2	0	4	X	8
(Minnesota) John Benton	0	0	1	0	0	3	0	1	0	X	5

Sheet C	1	2	3	4	5	6	7	8	9	10	Final
(Minnesota) Todd Birr	1	0	0	3	0	2	1	1	X	X	8
(Wisconsin) Paul Pustovar	0	0	2	0	1	0	0	0	X	X	3

Sheet D	1	2	3	4	5	6	7	8	9	10	Final
(Minnesota) Mike Farbelow	1	0	0	1	1	0	0	0	0	X	3
(North Dakota) Zach Jacobson	0	2	1	0	0	2	1	2	1	X	9

==== Draw 5 ====
Saturday, January 22, 1:00 pm

Sheet A	1	2	3	4	5	6	7	8	9	10	Final
(Minnesota) Mike Farbelow	1	1	0	1	0	2	0	1	0	X	6
(Minnesota) Todd Birr	0	0	1	0	1	0	2	0	5	X	9

Sheet B	1	2	3	4	5	6	7	8	9	10	Final
(North Dakota) Zach Jacobson	0	1	0	1	0	0	1	0	0	X	3
(Wisconsin) Paul Pustovar	0	0	1	0	2	1	0	1	0	X	5

Sheet C	1	2	3	4	5	6	7	8	9	10	Final
(Wisconsin) Kroy Nernberger	0	3	4	0	1	0	0	0	3	X	11
(New York (state)) Bryan Wight	2	0	0	2	0	2	0	1	0	X	7

Sheet D	1	2	3	4	5	6	7	8	9	10	Final
(Minnesota) John Benton	0	0	0	1	0	1	4	0	2	X	8
(North Dakota) Owen Sampson	0	0	2	0	2	0	0	1	0	X	5

==== Draw 6 ====
Saturday, January 22, 7:00 pm

Sheet A	1	2	3	4	5	6	7	8	9	10	Final
(Wisconsin) Paul Pustovar	0	0	0	0	0	X	X	X	X	X	0
(Minnesota) John Benton	0	0	3	2	3	X	X	X	X	X	8

Sheet B	1	2	3	4	5	6	7	8	9	10	Final
(New York (state)) Bryan Wight	0	1	0	0	1	0	X	X	X	X	2
(Minnesota) Mike Farbelow	1	0	3	1	0	2	X	X	X	X	7

Sheet C	1	2	3	4	5	6	7	8	9	10	Final
(North Dakota) Owen Sampson	0	0	1	0	0	1	0	0	X	X	2
(Minnesota) Todd Birr	1	1	0	3	1	0	1	3	X	X	10

Sheet D	1	2	3	4	5	6	7	8	9	10	Final
(North Dakota) Zach Jacobson	0	1	0	3	0	0	2	0	1	1	8
(Wisconsin) Kroy Nernberger	0	0	1	0	0	3	0	2	0	0	6

==== Draw 7 ====
Sunday, January 23, 9:00 am

Sheet A	Final
(Minnesota) Todd Birr	NP
(North Dakota) Zach Jacobson	NP

Sheet B	1	2	3	4	5	6	7	8	9	10	11	Final
(North Dakota) Owen Sampson	2	1	0	3	0	0	2	0	0	0	1	9
(Wisconsin) Kroy Nernberger	0	0	1	0	1	2	0	2	1	1	0	8

Sheet C	1	2	3	4	5	6	7	8	9	10	Final
(Wisconsin) Paul Pustovar	1	0	3	0	0	1	1	0	1	X	7
(Minnesota) Mike Farbelow	0	1	0	1	1	0	0	2	0	X	5

Sheet D	1	2	3	4	5	6	7	8	9	10	Final
(New York (state)) Bryan Wight	0	1	0	1	1	2	0	1	1	X	7
(Minnesota) John Benton	0	0	2	0	0	0	1	0	0	X	3
