= Florian Zörgiebel =

German curler (born 1965)

- Curler ♂
- Born: 15 November 1965 (age 60)

Team
- Curling club: CC Füssen, Füssen

Curling career
- Member Association: Germany
- World Championship: 3 (1990, 1991, 1998)
- Olympic: 1 (1988 – demo)
- Other appearances: World Junior Championships: 2 (1985, 1987), World Senior Championships: 1 (2019)
Medal record
Curling
German Men's Championship
Gold medal – first place	1990
Gold medal – first place	1991

Florian Zörgiebel (born 15 November 1965) is a German curler.

He participated in the demonstration curling events at the 1988 Winter Olympics, where the German team finished in seventh place.

At the national level, he is a two-time German men's champion curler (1990, 1991).

He also played for Switzerland at the 2019 World Senior Championship.

== Teams ==
Season	Skip	Third	Second	Lead	Alternate	Coach	Events
1984–85	Andy Kapp	Florian Zörgiebel	Cristopher Huber	Ulrich Schneider			WJCC 1985 (7th)
1986–87	Andy Kapp	Florian Zörgiebel	Cristopher Huber	Ulrich Schneider			WJCC 1987 (5th)
1987–88	Andy Kapp	Florian Zörgiebel	Cristopher Huber	Michael Schäffer	Dieter Kolb	Rodger Gustaf Schmidt	WOG 1988 (demo) (7th)
1989–90	Andy Kapp	Florian Zörgiebel	Cristopher Huber	Ulrich Schneider	Michael Schäffer	Rodger Gustaf Schmidt	GMCC 1990 (gold); WCC 1990 (10th)
1990–91	Andy Kapp	Florian Zörgiebel	Cristopher Huber	Ulrich Schneider			GMCC 1991 (gold)
1990–91	Andy Kapp	Florian Zörgiebel	Cristopher Huber	Michael Schäffer	Ulrich Schneider	Rodger Gustaf Schmidt	WCC 1991 (7th)
1997–98	Roland Jentsch	Uli Sutor	Florian Zörgiebel	Andreas Kempf	Alexander Huchel	Keith Wendorf	WCC 1998 (10th)
2018–19	Stefan Karnusian	Stewart Dryburgh	Kurt Reichenbach	Florian Zörgiebel			WSCC 2019 (4th)
