= Huchel =

Huchel is a German language surname. It stems from the male given name Hugo – and may refer to:

- Alexander Huchel, former German curler
- Peter Huchel (1903–1981), German poet and editor
