= 2009 USA-Brazil Challenge =

2009 Americas Challenge
- Host city: Bismarck, North Dakota
- Arena: Bismarck Capital Curling Club
- Dates: Jan. 30 - Feb. 1
- Winner: United States
- Skip: Todd Birr
- Third: Paul Pustovar
- Second: Greg Wilson
- Lead: Kevin Birr
- Finalist: Brazil (Marcelo Mello)

The 2009 USA-Brazil Challenge was a curling challenge held from January 30 to February 1, 2009 at the Bismarck Capital Curling Club in Bismarck, North Dakota. This was the first Americas Challenge.

The challenge featured the Brazilian national men's curling team against an American team in a best-of-five series. The winner would get to represent the second team from the Americas at the 2009 Ford World Men's Curling Championship. Canada automatically qualifies as both hosts and defending champions.

Until 2009, the United States (and Canada) have always automatically qualified on account of no other country in the Americas fielding curling teams. However, in 2008 the Brazilian Ice Sports Federation felt that their men's curling team had a high enough calibre that they were ready to face off with the Americans.

The American team was represented by Todd Birr, whose team was highest on the U.S. Order of Merit as of December 31, 2008 and who qualified for the 2009 United States Olympic Curling Trials.

The Brazilians were represented by their national team, which trained at the Lennoxville Curling Club in Lennoxville, Quebec. They are all students at the Université de Sherbrooke.

== Teams ==
Nation	Skip	Third	Second	Lead
Brazil	Marcelo Mello	Celso Kossaka	Luis Augusto Silva	Cesar Santos
United States	Todd Birr	Paul Pustovar	Greg Wilson	Kevin Birr

== Results ==
=== Game 1 ===
Sheet B	1	2	3	4	5	6	7	8	9	10	Final
Brazil (Mello)	0	0	0	1	0	1	X	X	X	X	2
United States (Birr) 🔨	4	2	4	0	3	0	X	X	X	X	13

=== Game 2 ===
Sheet B	1	2	3	4	5	6	7	8	9	10	Final
United States (Birr) 🔨	2	0	1	0	2	3	5	X	X	X	13
Brazil (Mello)	0	1	0	1	0	0	0	X	X	X	2

=== Game 3 ===
Sheet C	1	2	3	4	5	6	7	8	9	10	Final
United States (Birr) 🔨	0	0	3	0	4	0	4	0	X	X	11
Brazil (Mello)	1	2	0	1	0	1	0	0	X	X	5
