= Alexander Huchel =

German curler

- Curler ♂

Team
- Curling club: EV Füssen

Curling career
- Member Association: Germany
- World Championship: 1 (1998)
- European Championship: 1 (1991)
Medal record
Curling
Representing Germany
European Championships
Gold medal – first place	1991 Chamonix

Alexander Huchel is a former German curler.

He is a former European men's curling champion (1991).

== Teams ==
Season	Skip	Third	Second	Lead	Alternate	Coach	Events
1991–92	Roland Jentsch	Uli Sutor	Charlie Kapp	Alexander Huchel	Uli Kapp		ECC 1991 (gold)
1997–98	Roland Jentsch	Uli Sutor	Florian Zörgiebel	Andreas Kempf	Alexander Huchel	Keith Wendorf	WCC 1998 (10th)
