= 1998 World Men's Curling Championship =

- Host city: Kamloops, British Columbia
- Arena: Riverside Coliseum
- Dates: April 4–12, 1998
- Winner: Canada
- Curling club: St George's G&CC, Toronto, Ontario
- Skip: Wayne Middaugh
- Third: Graeme McCarrel
- Second: Ian Tetley
- Lead: Scott Bailey
- Alternate: David Carruthers
- Coach: Jim Waite
- Finalist: Sweden (Peja Lindholm)

The 1998 World Men's Curling Championship (branded as 1998 Ford World Men's Curling Championship for sponsorship reasons) was held at Riverside Coliseum in Kamloops, British Columbia from April 4–12, 1998.

== Teams ==
| Australia | Canada | Denmark | Finland | Germany |
|---|---|---|---|---|
| Sydney Harbour CC, Sydney Skip: Hugh Millikin; Third: Trevor Schumm; Second: John Theriault; Lead: Stephen Johns; Alternate: Stephen Hewitt | St. George's G&CC, Etobicoke, Ontario Skip: Wayne Middaugh; Third: Graeme McCarrel; Second: Ian Tetley; Lead: Scott Bailey; Alternate: David Carruthers | Hvidovre CC, Hvidovre Skip: Tommy Stjerne; Third: Gert Larsen; Second: Peter Andersen; Lead: Ivan Frederiksen; Alternate: Anders Søderblom | Hyvinkää CC, Hyvinkää Skip: Markku Uusipaavalniemi; Third: Wille Mäkelä; Second: Tommi Häti; Lead: Jari Laukkanen; Alternate: Jussi Uusipaavalniemi | Füssen CC, Füssen Skip: Roland Jentsch; Third: Uli Sutor; Second: Florian Zörgiebel; Lead: Andreas Kempf; Alternate: Alexander Huchel |
| Norway | Scotland | Sweden | Switzerland | United States |
| Snarøen CC, Oslo Skip: Thomas Ulsrud; Third: Thomas Due; Second: Torger Nergård; Lead: Johan Høstmælingen; Alternate: Rolf Andreas Lauten | St. Martins CC, Perth Skip: David Smith; Third: Warwick Smith; Second: Peter Smith; Lead: David Hay; Alternate: Mike Hay | Östersunds CK, Östersund Skip: Peja Lindholm; Third: Tomas Nordin; Second: Magnus Swartling; Lead: Peter Narup; Alternate: Marcus Feldt | Solothurn-Biber & St. Moritz CC Skip: Christof Schwaller; Third: Marc Haudenschild; Second: Reto Ziegler; Lead: Rolf Iseli; Alternate: Robert Hürlimann | Hibbing CC, Hibbing, Minnesota Skip: Paul Pustovar; Third: Dave Violette; Second: Greg Wilson; Lead: Cory Ward; Alternate: Shawn Rojeski |

== Round-robin standings ==
Key
| Teams to playoffs |
| Teams to tiebreaker |

| Country | Skip | W | L |
|---|---|---|---|
| Canada | Wayne Middaugh | 8 | 1 |
| Sweden | Peja Lindholm | 6 | 3 |
| Scotland | David Smith | 5 | 4 |
| Finland | Markku Uusipaavalniemi | 5 | 4 |
| Norway | Thomas Ulsrud | 5 | 4 |
| United States | Paul Pustovar | 4 | 5 |
| Denmark | Tommy Stjerne | 4 | 5 |
| Switzerland | Christof Schwaller | 4 | 5 |
| Australia | Hugh Millikin | 2 | 7 |
| Germany | Roland Jentsch | 2 | 7 |

== Round-robin results ==
=== Draw 1 ===
| Sheet A | Final |
| Australia (Millikin) | 8 |
| Germany (Jentsch) | 3 |

| Sheet B | Final |
| Norway (Ulsrud) | 4 |
| Scotland (Smith) | 8 |

| Sheet C | Final |
| Canada (Middaugh) | 10 |
| Sweden (Lindholm) | 6 |

| Sheet D | Final |
| Denmark (Stjerne) | 4 |
| United States (Pustovar) | 8 |

| Sheet E | Final |
| Switzerland (Schwaller) | 3 |
| Finland (Uusipaavalniemi) | 5 |

=== Draw 2 ===
| Sheet A | Final |
| Norway (Ulsrud) | 3 |
| Sweden (Lindholm) | 8 |

| Sheet B | Final |
| Switzerland (Schwaller) | 5 |
| Denmark (Stjerne) | 11 |

| Sheet C | Final |
| Scotland (Smith) | 5 |
| Finland (Uusipaavalniemi) | 6 |

| Sheet D | Final |
| Australia (Millikin) | 2 |
| Canada (Middaugh) | 11 |

| Sheet E | Final |
| United States (Pustovar) | 4 |
| Germany (Jentsch) | 11 |

=== Draw 3 ===
| Sheet A | Final |
| Switzerland (Schwaller) | 7 |
| Canada (Middaugh) | 8 |

| Sheet B | Final |
| Finland (Uusipaavalniemi) | 8 |
| United States (Pustovar) | 6 |

| Sheet C | Final |
| Denmark (Stjerne) | 5 |
| Norway (Ulsrud) | 3 |

| Sheet D | Final |
| Germany (Jentsch) | 1 |
| Scotland (Smith) | 8 |

| Sheet E | Final |
| Sweden (Lindholm) | 7 |
| Australia (Millikin) | 5 |

=== Draw 4 ===
| Sheet A | Final |
| Norway (Ulsrud) | 8 |
| Finland (Uusipaavalniemi) | 3 |

| Sheet B | Final |
| Scotland (Smith) | 7 |
| Australia (Millikin) | 4 |

| Sheet C | Final |
| Switzerland (Schwaller) | 6 |
| Germany (Jentsch) | 5 |

| Sheet D | Final |
| United States (Pustovar) | 2 |
| Sweden (Lindholm) | 5 |

| Sheet E | Final |
| Canada (Middaugh) | 5 |
| Denmark (Stjerne) | 4 |

=== Draw 5 ===
| Sheet A | Final |
| Sweden (Lindholm) | 6 |
| Denmark (Stjerne) | 7 |

| Sheet B | Final |
| Germany (Jentsch) | 6 |
| Norway (Ulsrud) | 9 |

| Sheet C | Final |
| Canada (Middaugh) | 7 |
| United States (Pustovar) | 6 |

| Sheet D | Final |
| Switzerland (Schwaller) | 9 |
| Scotland (Smith) | 3 |

| Sheet E | Final |
| Australia (Millikin) | 5 |
| Finland (Uusipaavalniemi) | 8 |

=== Draw 6 ===
| Sheet A | Final |
| Scotland (Smith) | 7 |
| United States (Pustovar) | 8 |

| Sheet B | Final |
| Denmark (Stjerne) | 2 |
| Australia (Millikin) | 9 |

| Sheet C | Final |
| Finland (Uusipaavalniemi) | 8 |
| Germany (Jentsch) | 3 |

| Sheet D | Final |
| Canada (Middaugh) | 6 |
| Norway (Ulsrud) | 8 |

| Sheet E | Final |
| Sweden (Lindholm) | 5 |
| Switzerland (Schwaller) | 3 |

=== Draw 7 ===
| Sheet A | Final |
| Canada (Middaugh) | 10 |
| Germany (Jentsch) | 5 |

| Sheet B | Final |
| United States (Pustovar) | 9 |
| Switzerland (Schwaller) | 6 |

| Sheet C | Final |
| Norway (Ulsrud) | 9 |
| Australia (Millikin) | 8 |

| Sheet D | Final |
| Finland (Uusipaavalniemi) | 2 |
| Sweden (Lindholm) | 5 |

| Sheet E | Final |
| Scotland (Smith) | 8 |
| Denmark (Stjerne) | 3 |

=== Draw 8 ===
| Sheet A | Final |
| Switzerland (Schwaller) | 9 |
| Australia (Millikin) | 3 |

| Sheet B | Final |
| Finland (Uusipaavalniemi) | 1 |
| Canada (Middaugh) | 8 |

| Sheet C | Final |
| Sweden (Lindholm) | 1 |
| Scotland (Smith) | 4 |

| Sheet D | Final |
| Denmark (Stjerne) | 3 |
| Germany (Jentsch) | 8 |

| Sheet E | Final |
| United States (Pustovar) | 7 |
| Norway (Ulsrud) | 8 |

=== Draw 9 ===
| Sheet A | Final |
| Finland (Uusipaavalniemi) | 6 |
| Denmark (Stjerne) | 8 |

| Sheet B | Final |
| Sweden (Lindholm) | 7 |
| Germany (Jentsch) | 3 |

| Sheet C | Final |
| United States (Pustovar) | 8 |
| Australia (Millikin) | 7 |

| Sheet D | Final |
| Switzerland (Schwaller) | 6 |
| Norway (Ulsrud) | 2 |

| Sheet E | Final |
| Canada (Middaugh) | 6 |
| Scotland (Smith) | 5 |

== Tiebreaker ==
| Sheet A | Final |
| Finland (Uusipaavalniemi) | 8 |
| Norway (Ulsrud) | 7 |

== Playoffs ==
=== Brackets ===
Semi-final
1 | Canada | 9
4 | Finland | 2
2 | Sweden | 5
3 | Scotland | 3

Final
1 | Canada | 7
2 | Sweden | 4
Bronze medal
3 | Scotland | 5
4 | Finland | 6

=== Final ===
| Sheet A | 1 | 2 | 3 | 4 | 5 | 6 | 7 | 8 | 9 | 10 | Final |
|---|---|---|---|---|---|---|---|---|---|---|---|
| Sweden (Lindholm) | 0 | 0 | 2 | 0 | 0 | 1 | 1 | 0 | 0 | 0 | 4 |
| Canada (Middaugh) | 0 | 2 | 0 | 1 | 0 | 0 | 0 | 2 | 1 | 1 | 7 |

1998 Ford World Curling Championship
(Canada)
Canada
25th title
