= Greg Johnson (curler) =

American curler

- Curler
- Born: June 25, 1975 (age 51); Waupaca, Wisconsin, United States

Team
- Curling club: Appleton CC, Appleton, Wisconsin
- Skip: Todd Birr
- Third: Greg Johnson
- Second: Hunter Clawson
- Lead: Tom O'Connor

Curling career
- Member Association: United States
- World Championship: 1 (2007)
Medal record
Curling
World Championships
Bronze medal – third place	2007 Edmonton
United States Men's Championship
Gold medal – first place	2007 Utica
Bronze medal – third place	2019 Kalamazoo

Greg Johnson (born June 25, 1975) is an American curler from Appleton, Wisconsin, originally from Waupaca, Wisconsin. He played second on Todd Birr's rink that won the 2007 United States Men's Curling Championship and went on to win the bronze medal at the 2007 World Men's Curling Championship in Edmonton, the first medal for the United States at the men's world championship since 1993. He later won a second national medal, a bronze at the 2019 United States Men's Curling Championship, playing third for Birr.

== Career ==
=== Junior career ===
Johnson started curling in 1987, at the age of 12. As a junior, he skipped his team to the 1996 Wisconsin State Junior Men's Championship, earning a spot at the 1996 United States Junior Curling Championships, where the team finished fifth.

=== Men's career ===
Johnson made his first appearance at the United States Men's Curling Championship in 2000, playing second for Doug Pottinger. The following season, the Pottinger rink earned the fourth qualifying spot at the U.S. National Men's Qualifier for the 2001 United States Olympic Curling Trials, where they finished fifth. Johnson returned to nationals in 2003 with Tim Somerville's team, finishing sixth, and again in 2006 with Troy Schroeder, finishing eighth.

==== 2007 national title and World Championship ====
For the 2006–07 season, Johnson joined a rink skipped by Todd Birr of Minnesota, with Bill Todhunter at third and Kevin Birr at lead. At the 2007 U.S. Men's Championship in Utica, New York, the team defeated Craig Disher's North Dakota rink 6–5 in the final to win the national title and earn the right to represent the United States at the 2007 World Men's Curling Championship.

At the World Championship in Edmonton, the American team reached the playoffs and won the bronze medal, the country's first men's world championship medal since 1993. Glenn Howard of Canada won the gold medal over Germany's Andy Kapp. In recognition of the result, the Birr rink was named the United States Olympic Committee Team of the Month for April 2007 and the USA Curling Team of the Year for 2007. The team returned to defend their title at the 2008 national championship but finished eighth.

==== Later career ====
Johnson played second for Craig Brown in the 2010–11 season, on a team that also included Olympian John Shuster, finishing sixth at the 2011 United States Men's Curling Championship. He later reunited with Todd Birr, moving to third by the 2017–18 season with Hunter Clawson at second and Tom O'Connor at lead.

In the 2018–19 season, the Birr rink finished third at the Let's Cure Lupus St. Paul Cash Spiel and fifth at the U.S. Open of Curling, then won the USA Men's Challenge Round in Blaine, Minnesota to qualify for nationals. At the 2019 United States Men's Curling Championship in Kalamazoo, Michigan, the team won the bronze medal.

=== Mixed doubles ===
Johnson competed at the 2018 United States Mixed Doubles Curling Championship with Emmalee Nichols, finishing 13th.

== Teams ==
=== Men's ===
Season	Skip	Third	Second	Lead	Alternate	Coach	Events
1995–96	Greg Johnson	Brian Kopp	David Nelson	Derrick Casper	Thomas Casper		USJCC 1996 (5th)
1999–00	Doug Pottinger	Troy Schroeder	Greg Johnson	Bill Todhunter	Kurt Johnson		USMCC 2000 (DNQ)
2001–02	Doug Pottinger	Troy Schroeder	Greg Johnson	Bill Todhunter	Nate Gebert		USOCT 2001 (5th)
2002–03	Tim Somerville	Mike Schneeberger	Greg Johnson	John Gordon	Dave Puleo		USMCC 2003 (6th)
2004–05	Troy Schroeder	Sean Silver	Greg Johnson	Donnie Henry			
2005–06	Troy Schroeder	Bill Todhunter	Greg Johnson	Sean Silver			USMCC 2006 (8th)
2006–07	Todd Birr	Bill Todhunter	Greg Johnson	Kevin Birr	Zach Jacobson	Paul Pustovar	USMCC 2007 (gold); WCC 2007 (bronze)
2007–08	Derrick Casper	Greg Johnson	Scott Belvitch	Jeff Kuemmel			
2007–08	Todd Birr	Bill Todhunter	Greg Johnson	Kevin Birr	Paul Pustovar (USMCC)		CCC 2007 (gold); USMCC 2008 (8th)
2010–11	Craig Brown	John Shuster	Greg Johnson	Derrick Casper	Jeremiah Dotlich		USMCC 2011 (6th)
2014–15	Todd Birr	Doug Pottinger	Greg Johnson	Tom O'Connor			
2017–18	Todd Birr	Greg Johnson	Hunter Clawson	Tom O'Connor			
2018–19	Todd Birr	Greg Johnson	Hunter Clawson	Tom O'Connor	Michael Roos		USMCC 2019 (bronze)

=== Mixed doubles ===
Season	Male	Female	Events
2017–18	Greg Johnson	Emmalee Nichols	USMDCC 2018 (13th)

== Private life ==
Johnson earned a degree in wood technics from Fox Valley Technical College and works as an expeditor in sales for Valley Planing Mill, Inc. He has two daughters.
