= 1991 European Curling Championships =

- Host city: Chamonix, France
- Arena: Patinoire de Chamonix
- Dates: December 8–14
- Men's winner: Germany
- Skip: Roland Jentsch
- Third: Uli Sutor
- Second: Charlie Kapp
- Lead: Alexander Huchel
- Alternate: Uli Kapp
- Finalist: Scotland
- Women's winner: Germany
- Curling club: SC Riessersee, Garmisch-Partenkirchen
- Skip: Andrea Schöpp
- Third: Stephanie Mayr
- Second: Monika Wagner
- Lead: Sabine Huth
- Finalist: Norway

The 1991 European Curling Championships were held from December 8 to 14 at the Patinoire de Chamonix in Chamonix, France.

Teams from Germany won both the men's and women's event. On the men's side, Roland Jentsch won his only European Championship of his career. It was Germany's second men's title. Andrea Schöpp led Germany to her fourth European title, and the country's fifth women's European championship.

== Men's ==
=== A Tournament ===
==== Group A ====
| Team | Skip | W | L |
|---|---|---|---|
| Scotland | David Smith | 5 | 1 |
| Germany | Roland Jentsch | 4 | 2 |
| Switzerland | Daniel Model | 4 | 2 |
| Sweden | Per Hedén | 4 | 2 |
| France | Dominique Dupont-Roc | 2 | 4 |
| Denmark | Gert Larsen | 2 | 4 |
| Norway | Tormod Andreassen | 0 | 6 |

=== Playoffs ===
Semifinal
1 | Scotland | 6
4 | Sweden | 4
2 | Germany | 8
3 | Switzerland | 6

Final
1 | Scotland | 3
2 | Germany | 4

| Bronze medal |
| 3 | Switzerland | 9 |
| 4 | Sweden | 8 |

== Women's ==
=== Group A ===
| Team | Skip | W | L |
|---|---|---|---|
| Norway | Trine Trulsen | 4 | 2 |
| Denmark | Helena Blach | 4 | 2 |
| Germany | Andrea Schöpp | 3 | 3 |
| Sweden | Anette Norberg | 3 | 3 |
| Scotland | Hazel Erskine | 3 | 3 |
| Switzerland | Brigitte Leutenegger | 2 | 4 |
| France | Annick Mercier | 2 | 4 |

=== Tiebreaker ===
- Germany 6-5 Scotland
- Sweden 5-4 Scotland

=== Playoffs ===
Semifinal
1 | Norway | 10
4 | Sweden | 8
2 | Denmark | 6
3 | Germany | 8

Final
1 | Norway | 2
3 | Germany | 5

| Bronze medal |
| 2 | Denmark | 3 |
| 4 | Sweden | 9 |
