= 2019 Canadian Curling Club Championships =

Canadian national curling championship edition

- Host city: Leduc, Alberta
- Arena: Leduc Curling Club
- Dates: November 25–30
- Men's winner: Ontario
- Curling club: Kitchener–Waterloo GC, Kitchener–Waterloo
- Skip: Paul Moffatt
- Third: Ben Shane
- Second: John Gabel
- Lead: Kyle Forester
- Finalist: Quebec (Gibeau)
- Women's winner: Alberta
- Curling club: Lethbridge CC, Lethbridge
- Skip: Nanette Dupont
- Third: Samantha Davies
- Second: Kendra Nakagama
- Lead: Avice DeKelver
- Finalist: Nova Scotia (Phillips)

The 2019 Canadian Curling Club Championships was held from November 25 to 30 at the Leduc Curling Club in Leduc, Alberta.

In the Men's final, Paul Moffatt's rink from the Kitchener-Waterloo Granite Club in Ontario defeated the Jasmin Gibeau rink from the Club de Curling Thurso in Quebec 10–5 to claim the title. It was the KW Granite Club's first victory at the Club Championships. In the bronze medal game, Northern Ontario's Ben Mikkelsen rink from the Port Arthur Curling Club shut out the Tyler Williams rink from the Whitehorse Curling Club in Yukon 12–0.

In the Women's final, Alberta's Nanette Dupont rink from the Lethbridge Curling Club defeated Nova Scotia's Tanya Phillips rink from the CFB Halifax Curling Club 9–4 to win the gold medal. It was a second championship for Dupont as she won the title in 2010. In the bronze medal game, Quebec's Isabelle Néron rink from the Club de Curling Chicoutimi beat the Peggy Dorosz rink from the Whitehorse Curling Club in Yukon 9–5.

== Men ==
=== Teams ===
The teams are listed as follows:

Team	Skip	Third	Second	Lead	Locale
Alberta	Dale Goehring	Christopher Armstrong	Fred Edwards	Andrew Brotherhood	The Glencoe Club, Calgary
British Columbia	Cody Johnston	Will Sutton	Brady Currie	Christopher Summers/Adam Grossi	Royal City Curling Club, New Westminster
Manitoba	Derek Blanchard	Brian Thomson	Scott Bruce	Daniel Gagné	Assiniboine Memorial Curling Club, Winnipeg
New Brunswick	Jeff Lacey	Mitch Downey	Jordon Craft	Nicholas Munn	Thistle-St. Andrew's Curling Club, Saint John
Newfoundland and Labrador	Rod Feltham	Scott Davidge	Kris MacLeod	Baxter House	Gander Curling Club, Gander
Northern Ontario	Ben Mikkelsen	Greg Doran	Christopher Briand	Devin Doran	Port Arthur Curling Club, Thunder Bay
Northwest Territories	Chris Kelln	Trevor Moss	Travis Weagant	Nick Rivet	Yellowknife Curling Club, Yellowknife
Nova Scotia	Mike Callaghan	Pete Ross	Ian Wilson	Brad Wilson	Mayflower Curling Club, Halifax
Nunavut	Wade Kingdon	Greg Howard	Hunter Tootoo	Aaron Fraser	Iqaluit Curling Club, Iqaluit
Ontario	Paul Moffatt	Ben Shane	John Gabel	Kyle Forster	Kitchener-Waterloo Granite, Waterloo
Prince Edward Island	Dennis Watts	Erik Brodersen	Andrew MacDougall	Doug MacGregor	Charlottetown Curling Complex, Charlottetown
Quebec	Jasmin Gibeau	Dan deWaard	Dan Lemery	Kevin Ménard	CC Thurso, Thurso
Saskatchewan	Aaron Gaudreau	Jason Schlachter	Tom Johnson	Joel MacDonald	Humboldt Curling Club, Humboldt
Yukon	Tyler Williams	Kevin Yost	Matt Johnson	Trent Derkatch	Whitehorse Curling Club, Whitehorse

=== Round-robin standings ===
Final round-robin standings

Key
Teams to Championship Round

Pool A	Skip	W	L
Ontario	Paul Moffatt	5	1
Northern Ontario	Ben Mikkelsen	4	2
Saskatchewan	Aaron Gaudreau	3	3
New Brunswick	Jeff Lacey	3	3
Alberta	Dale Goehring	3	3
Newfoundland and Labrador	Rod Feltham	2	4
Nunavut	Wade Kingdon	1	5

Pool B	Skip	W	L
Nova Scotia	Mike Callaghan	5	1
Quebec	Jasmin Gibeau	5	1
Yukon	Tyler Williams	4	2
British Columbia	Cody Johnston	4	2
Manitoba	Derek Blanchard	2	4
Prince Edward Island	Dennis Watts	1	5
Northwest Territories	Chris Kelln	0	6

=== Round-robin results ===
All draws are listed in Eastern Time (UTC−04:00).

==== Draw 1 ====
Monday, November 25, 4:00 pm

Sheet A	1	2	3	4	5	6	7	8	Final
Yukon (Williams)	2	0	2	0	0	2	0	2	8
British Columbia (Johnston) 🔨	0	1	0	0	1	0	4	0	6

Sheet F	1	2	3	4	5	6	7	8	Final
Saskatchewan (Gaudreau)	0	1	0	2	0	2	0	0	5
Newfoundland and Labrador (Feltham) 🔨	0	0	1	0	2	0	2	1	6

==== Draw 2 ====
Monday, November 25, 8:30 pm

Sheet A	1	2	3	4	5	6	7	8	Final
Northern Ontario (Mikkelsen) 🔨	2	0	2	0	3	0	X	X	7
New Brunswick (Lacey)	0	0	0	1	0	1	X	X	2

Sheet B	1	2	3	4	5	6	7	8	Final
Northwest Territories (Kelln) 🔨	1	0	1	0	0	0	X	X	2
Nova Scotia (Callaghan)	0	2	0	3	2	2	X	X	9

Sheet D	1	2	3	4	5	6	7	8	Final
Nunavut (Kingdon)	0	1	0	0	1	0	X	X	2
Alberta (Goehring) 🔨	1	0	2	2	0	5	X	X	10

Sheet F	1	2	3	4	5	6	7	8	Final
Prince Edward Island (Watts)	0	3	0	1	0	0	1	2	7
Quebec (Gibeau) 🔨	2	0	1	0	3	2	0	0	8

==== Draw 3 ====
Tuesday, November 26, 10:00 am

Sheet B	1	2	3	4	5	6	7	8	9	Final
Newfoundland and Labrador (Feltham)	1	0	0	1	1	0	0	1	0	4
Alberta (Goehring) 🔨	0	1	0	0	0	2	1	0	1	5

Sheet D	1	2	3	4	5	6	7	8	Final
Manitoba (Blanchard) 🔨	2	1	1	0	2	0	1	X	7
Prince Edward Island (Watts)	0	0	0	2	0	0	0	X	2

Sheet F	1	2	3	4	5	6	7	8	Final
New Brunswick (Lacey) 🔨	0	0	0	1	1	0	1	X	3
Ontario (Moffatt)	0	0	2	0	0	3	0	X	5

Sheet G	1	2	3	4	5	6	7	8	Final
Yukon (Williams) 🔨	0	0	1	0	0	1	X	X	2
Nova Scotia (Callaghan)	2	1	0	3	2	0	X	X	8

==== Draw 4 ====
Tuesday, November 26, 2:00 pm

Sheet B	1	2	3	4	5	6	7	8	Final
Nunavut (Kingdon) 🔨	2	3	1	1	0	3	X	X	10
Saskatchewan (Gaudreau)	0	0	0	0	3	0	X	X	3

Sheet C	1	2	3	4	5	6	7	8	Final
Northwest Territories (Kelln) 🔨	0	1	0	1	0	0	1	X	3
British Columbia (Johnston)	1	0	2	0	2	2	0	X	7

Sheet D	1	2	3	4	5	6	7	8	Final
Ontario (Moffatt) 🔨	1	0	3	0	1	0	0	3	8
Northern Ontario (Mikkelsen)	0	1	0	2	0	0	2	0	5

Sheet G	1	2	3	4	5	6	7	8	Final
Quebec (Gibeau) 🔨	3	1	0	1	0	0	1	0	6
Manitoba (Blanchard)	0	0	1	0	2	0	0	1	4

==== Draw 5 ====
Tuesday, November 26, 6:00 pm

Sheet E	1	2	3	4	5	6	7	8	9	Final
Alberta (Goehring)	0	0	1	0	1	0	0	1	0	3
New Brunswick (Lacey) 🔨	1	0	0	1	0	1	0	0	1	4

Sheet H	1	2	3	4	5	6	7	8	Final
Nova Scotia (Callaghan) 🔨	3	0	2	0	0	0	1	1	7
Prince Edward Island (Watts)	0	2	0	2	1	1	0	0	6

==== Draw 6 ====
Wednesday, November 27, 10:00 am

Sheet C	1	2	3	4	5	6	7	8	Final
Northern Ontario (Mikkelsen) 🔨	0	0	0	0	1	0	1	0	2
Saskatchewan (Gaudreau)	0	0	0	0	0	2	0	1	3

Sheet D	1	2	3	4	5	6	7	8	Final
British Columbia (Johnston) 🔨	1	0	0	0	0	0	X	X	1
Quebec (Gibeau)	0	1	1	2	1	1	X	X	6

Sheet G	1	2	3	4	5	6	7	8	Final
Newfoundland and Labrador (Feltham)	0	0	1	0	1	0	1	X	3
Ontario (Moffatt) 🔨	0	2	0	3	0	1	0	X	6

Sheet H	1	2	3	4	5	6	7	8	9	Final
Yukon (Williams)	0	2	1	1	0	1	0	1	1	7
Manitoba (Blanchard) 🔨	1	0	0	0	3	0	2	0	0	6

==== Draw 7 ====
Wednesday, November 27, 2:00 pm

Sheet C	1	2	3	4	5	6	7	8	Final
Ontario (Moffatt)	0	0	3	0	0	0	0	0	3
Alberta (Goehring) 🔨	0	1	0	1	1	1	0	3	7

Sheet E	1	2	3	4	5	6	7	8	Final
Nova Scotia (Callaghan)	0	0	2	0	3	0	0	1	6
Manitoba (Blanchard) 🔨	0	0	0	2	0	2	1	0	5

Sheet G	1	2	3	4	5	6	7	8	Final
Nunavut (Kingdon)	0	0	0	0	0	1	0	X	1
Northern Ontario (Mikkelsen) 🔨	2	1	1	1	0	0	3	X	8

Sheet H	1	2	3	4	5	6	7	8	Final
Quebec (Gibeau) 🔨	2	0	0	0	2	2	0	X	6
Northwest Territories (Kelln)	0	0	1	1	0	0	1	X	3

==== Draw 8 ====
Wednesday, November 27, 6:00 pm

Sheet C	1	2	3	4	5	6	7	8	Final
Newfoundland and Labrador (Feltham) 🔨	1	2	0	0	1	2	0	1	7
Nunavut (Kingdon)	0	0	2	2	0	0	1	0	5

Sheet D	1	2	3	4	5	6	7	8	Final
Northwest Territories (Kelln)	0	1	0	0	1	0	1	0	3
Yukon (Williams) 🔨	1	0	1	0	0	2	0	1	5

Sheet G	1	2	3	4	5	6	7	8	Final
British Columbia (Johnston) 🔨	0	0	1	1	1	0	0	2	5
Prince Edward Island (Watts)	1	1	0	0	0	1	0	0	3

Sheet H	1	2	3	4	5	6	7	8	9	Final
Saskatchewan (Gaudreau) 🔨	0	1	1	0	0	2	2	0	3	9
New Brunswick (Lacey)	1	0	0	2	1	0	0	2	0	6

==== Draw 9 ====
Thursday, November 28, 8:30 am

Sheet A	1	2	3	4	5	6	7	8	Final
Manitoba (Blanchard)	1	0	1	4	0	0	4	X	10
Northwest Territories (Kelln) 🔨	0	3	0	0	2	2	0	X	7

Sheet H	1	2	3	4	5	6	7	8	Final
Ontario (Moffatt) 🔨	3	2	3	0	2	1	X	X	11
Nunavut (Kingdon)	0	0	0	1	0	0	X	X	1

==== Draw 10 ====
Thursday, November 28, 12:30 pm

Sheet A	1	2	3	4	5	6	7	8	Final
Alberta (Goehring)	0	0	0	1	0	1	2	0	4
Saskatchewan (Gaudreau) 🔨	0	0	4	0	1	0	0	2	7

Sheet B	1	2	3	4	5	6	7	8	Final
Prince Edward Island (Watts) 🔨	2	1	0	1	0	0	0	X	4
Yukon (Williams)	0	0	2	0	1	1	3	X	7

Sheet D	1	2	3	4	5	6	7	8	Final
New Brunswick (Lacey) 🔨	1	1	1	0	3	0	1	X	7
Newfoundland and Labrador (Feltham)	0	0	0	1	0	1	0	X	2

Sheet F	1	2	3	4	5	6	7	8	Final
British Columbia (Johnston) 🔨	0	0	0	2	0	4	1	X	7
Nova Scotia (Callaghan)	0	0	0	0	1	0	0	X	1

==== Draw 11 ====
Thursday, November 28, 4:30 pm

Sheet A	1	2	3	4	5	6	7	8	Final
New Brunswick (Lacey) 🔨	0	2	0	1	3	0	1	X	7
Nunavut (Kingdon)	1	0	2	0	0	0	0	X	3

Sheet C	1	2	3	4	5	6	7	8	Final
Quebec (Gibeau) 🔨	3	0	3	0	3	0	X	X	9
Yukon (Williams)	0	1	0	1	0	1	X	X	3

Sheet E	1	2	3	4	5	6	7	8	Final
Prince Edward Island (Watts) 🔨	1	1	0	0	4	0	0	0	6
Northwest Territories (Kelln)	0	0	1	1	0	1	1	1	5

Sheet H	1	2	3	4	5	6	7	8	Final
Northern Ontario (Mikkelsen) 🔨	1	3	0	1	0	1	X	X	6
Newfoundland and Labrador (Feltham)	0	0	1	0	0	0	X	X	1

==== Draw 12 ====
Thursday, November 28, 8:30 pm

Sheet A	1	2	3	4	5	6	7	8	Final
Nova Scotia (Callaghan) 🔨	0	2	2	0	1	0	3	X	8
Quebec (Gibeau)	1	0	0	1	0	2	0	X	4

Sheet B	1	2	3	4	5	6	7	8	9	Final
Manitoba (Blanchard)	0	0	1	0	0	3	0	2	0	6
British Columbia (Johnston) 🔨	0	2	0	2	1	0	1	0	1	7

Sheet E	1	2	3	4	5	6	7	8	Final
Saskatchewan (Gaudreau)	0	0	1	0	0	0	X	X	1
Ontario (Moffatt) 🔨	1	2	0	1	1	1	X	X	6

Sheet F	1	2	3	4	5	6	7	8	Final
Alberta (Goehring) 🔨	0	1	0	0	0	1	0	X	2
Northern Ontario (Mikkelsen)	2	0	1	1	0	0	1	X	5

=== Championship round ===
==== A Bracket ====
Qualifier 1
A1	Ontario	8
B4	British Columbia	2
A1	Ontario	8
A3	Saskatchewan	3
B2	Quebec	4
A3	Saskatchewan	6

Qualifier 2
B1	Nova Scotia	3
A4	New Brunswick	6
A4	New Brunswick	5
A2	Northern Ontario	6
A2	Northern Ontario	11
B3	Yukon	1

==== B Bracket ====
			Qualifier 3
			A4	New Brunswick	3
B4	British Columbia	6	B2	Quebec	8
B2	Quebec	7

			Qualifier 4
			A3	Saskatchewan	5
B1	Nova Scotia	7	B3	Yukon	7
B3	Yukon	8

==== A Event ====
===== Semifinals =====
Friday, November 29, 9:00 am

Sheet A	1	2	3	4	5	6	7	8	Final
Northern Ontario (Mikkelsen) 🔨	0	2	3	1	2	3	X	X	11
Yukon (Williams)	1	0	0	0	0	0	X	X	1

Sheet B	1	2	3	4	5	6	7	8	Final
Quebec (Gibeau) 🔨	1	0	0	0	2	1	0	0	4
Saskatchewan (Gaudreau)	0	0	1	1	0	0	2	2	6

Sheet C	1	2	3	4	5	6	7	8	Final
Nova Scotia (Callaghan) 🔨	0	1	0	1	0	1	0	0	3
New Brunswick (Lacey)	1	0	3	0	1	0	0	1	6

Sheet D	1	2	3	4	5	6	7	8	Final
Ontario (Moffatt) 🔨	1	0	0	3	0	1	3	X	8
British Columbia (Johnston)	0	1	0	0	1	0	0	X	2

===== Finals =====
Friday, November 29, 2:00 pm

Sheet F	1	2	3	4	5	6	7	8	Final
Ontario (Moffatt) 🔨	1	0	4	0	3	0	X	X	8
Saskatchewan (Gaudreau)	0	0	0	2	0	1	X	X	3

Sheet G	1	2	3	4	5	6	7	8	9	Final
New Brunswick (Lacey)	0	3	0	0	0	1	0	1	0	5
Northern Ontario (Mikkelsen) 🔨	1	0	1	0	1	0	2	0	1	6

==== B Event ====
===== Semifinals =====
Friday, November 29, 2:00 pm

Sheet E	1	2	3	4	5	6	7	8	9	Final
Nova Scotia (Callaghan) 🔨	2	0	2	0	0	3	0	0	0	7
Yukon (Williams)	0	4	0	1	0	0	1	1	1	8

Sheet H	1	2	3	4	5	6	7	8	Final
British Columbia (Johnston)	0	2	0	3	0	1	0	0	6
Quebec (Gibeau) 🔨	2	0	1	0	1	0	2	1	7

===== Finals =====
Friday, November 29, 7:00 pm

Sheet E	1	2	3	4	5	6	7	8	Final
Saskatchewan (Gaudreau)	2	0	1	0	0	1	1	0	5
Yukon (Williams) 🔨	0	4	0	1	1	0	0	1	7

Sheet G	1	2	3	4	5	6	7	8	Final
New Brunswick (Lacey)	0	2	1	0	0	0	X	X	3
Quebec (Gibeau) 🔨	2	0	0	2	1	3	X	X	8

=== Playoffs ===
Semifinals
1	Ontario	7
4	Yukon	4
2	Northern Ontario	5
3	Quebec	8

Final
1	Ontario	10
3	Quebec	5

Bronze medal game
4	Yukon	0
2	Northern Ontario	12

==== Semifinals ====
Saturday, November 30, 9:00 am

Sheet A	1	2	3	4	5	6	7	8	Final
Northern Ontario (Mikkelsen)	2	0	0	0	2	1	0	X	5
Quebec (Gibeau) 🔨	0	3	2	1	0	0	2	X	8

Sheet C	1	2	3	4	5	6	7	8	Final
Ontario (Moffatt) 🔨	0	2	0	1	3	1	0	X	7
Yukon (Williams)	1	0	3	0	0	0	0	X	4

==== Bronze medal game ====
Saturday, November 30, 2:00 pm

Sheet E	1	2	3	4	5	6	7	8	Final
Yukon (Williams)	0	0	0	0	X	X	X	X	0
Northern Ontario (Mikkelsen) 🔨	3	3	3	3	X	X	X	X	12

==== Final ====
Saturday, November 30, 2:00 pm

Sheet G	1	2	3	4	5	6	7	8	Final
Ontario (Moffatt) 🔨	3	0	2	1	0	0	1	3	10
Quebec (Gibeau)	0	2	0	0	2	1	0	0	5

== Women ==
=== Teams ===
The teams are listed as follows:

Team	Skip	Third	Second	Lead	Locale
Alberta	Nanette Dupont	Samantha Davies	Kendra Nakagama	Avice DeKelver	Lethbridge Curling Club, Lethbridge
British Columbia	Mary Ellen Konyer	Sharon Wright	Kellie Rice	Lorna Black	Nanaimo CC, Nanaimo
Manitoba	Tracy Andries	Crystal Kennedy	Diane Christensen	April Klassen	Fort Rouge Curling Club, Winnipeg
New Brunswick	Sandy Comeau	Shelley Thomas	Lynn LeBlanc	Molly Boucher	Curl Moncton, Moncton
Newfoundland and Labrador	Susan Curtis	Donna Davis	Kathryn Miles	Carolyn Colbourne	Corner Brook Curling Club, Corner Brook
Northern Ontario	Tracey Larocque	Corie Adamson	Rebecca Carr	Emily Juurakko	Fort William Curling Club, Thunder Bay
Northwest Territories	Katrina Delorey	Cathy Heron	Ashley Rowe	Dayna King	Hay River Curling Club, Hay River
Nova Scotia	Tanya Phillips	Heather Whiteway	Angela Pettipas	Christine Keddy	CFB Halifax Curling Club, Halifax
Nunavut	Denise Hutchings	Megan Ingram	Carmen Kootoo	Gaylene Shoemaker	Iqaluit Curling Club, Iqaluit
Ontario	Laurie Shields	Lisa Rolfe	Samantha Fuller	Nadine Simpson	York Curling Club, Newmarket
Prince Edward Island	Melissa Morrow	Darcee Birch	Lindsey Spencer	Miranda Ellis	Silver Fox C&YCC, Summerside
Quebec	Isabelle Néron	Karine Tremblay	Édith Cottenoir	Véronique Bouchard	CC Chicoutimi, Chicoutimi, Saguenay
Saskatchewan	Danette Tracey	Jade Bloor	Shelby Sidloski	Calli Benko	Weyburn Curling Club, Weyburn
Yukon	Peggy Dorosz	Laini Klassen	Kandice Braga	Inge Brown	Whitehorse Curling Club, Whitehorse

=== Round-robin standings ===
Final round-robin standings

Key
Teams to Championship Round

Pool A	Skip	W	L
Alberta	Nanette Dupont	5	1
Nova Scotia	Tanya Phillips	5	1
Newfoundland and Labrador	Susan Curtis	4	2
Prince Edward Island	Melissa Morrow	3	3
British Columbia	Mary Ellen Konyer	2	4
Northwest Territories	Katrina Delorey	1	5
Nunavut	Denise Hutchings	1	5

Pool B	Skip	W	L
Quebec	Isabelle Néron	4	2
Yukon	Peggy Dorosz	4	2
Saskatchewan	Danette Tracey	4	2
Ontario	Laurie Shields	4	2
Manitoba	Tracy Andries	3	3
New Brunswick	Sandy Comeau	1	5
Northern Ontario	Tracey Larocque	1	5

=== Round-robin results ===
All draws are listed in Eastern Time (UTC−04:00).

==== Draw 1 ====
Monday, November 25, 4:00 pm

Sheet D	1	2	3	4	5	6	7	8	Final
New Brunswick (Comeau)	0	1	0	0	1	0	1	0	3
Ontario (Shields) 🔨	1	0	0	3	0	1	0	1	6

Sheet H	1	2	3	4	5	6	7	8	Final
Nova Scotia (Phillips)	0	1	1	0	4	0	1	X	7
Newfoundland and Labrador (Curtis) 🔨	0	0	0	1	0	2	0	X	3

==== Draw 2 ====
Monday, November 25, 8:30 pm

Sheet C	1	2	3	4	5	6	7	8	Final
Northern Ontario (Larocque) 🔨	0	0	0	1	0	1	1	X	3
Saskatchewan (Tracey)	1	1	1	0	3	0	0	X	6

Sheet E	1	2	3	4	5	6	7	8	Final
Nunavut (Hutchings)	0	0	1	0	0	1	0	X	2
British Columbia (Konyer) 🔨	1	2	0	1	3	0	0	X	7

Sheet G	1	2	3	4	5	6	7	8	Final
Yukon (Dorosz)	0	1	0	0	1	0	1	X	3
Quebec (Néron) 🔨	2	0	1	3	0	1	0	X	7

Sheet H	1	2	3	4	5	6	7	8	Final
Northwest Territories (Delorey) 🔨	0	1	0	0	0	0	X	X	1
Prince Edward Island (Morrow)	2	0	2	3	1	4	X	X	12

==== Draw 3 ====
Tuesday, November 26, 10:00 am

Sheet A	1	2	3	4	5	6	7	8	Final
New Brunswick (Comeau)	0	0	1	0	0	2	0	X	3
Quebec (Néron) 🔨	0	0	0	1	5	0	2	X	8

Sheet C	1	2	3	4	5	6	7	8	Final
Prince Edward Island (Morrow) 🔨	0	2	0	2	0	0	0	0	4
Alberta (Dupont)	0	0	1	0	4	1	0	1	7

Sheet E	1	2	3	4	5	6	7	8	Final
Manitoba (Andries) 🔨	1	0	0	5	3	0	1	X	10
Northern Ontario (Larocque)	0	1	1	0	0	2	0	X	4

Sheet H	1	2	3	4	5	6	7	8	Final
Newfoundland and Labrador (Curtis) 🔨	1	0	0	0	3	2	0	X	6
British Columbia (Konyer)	0	0	1	1	0	0	1	X	3

==== Draw 4 ====
Tuesday, November 26, 2:00 pm

Sheet A	1	2	3	4	5	6	7	8	Final
Saskatchewan (Tracey) 🔨	5	0	0	2	0	1	X	X	8
Manitoba (Andries)	0	0	1	0	1	0	X	X	2

Sheet E	1	2	3	4	5	6	7	8	Final
Alberta (Dupont)	1	1	3	2	0	1	0	4	12
Northwest Territories (Delorey) 🔨	0	0	0	0	1	0	1	0	2

Sheet H	1	2	3	4	5	6	7	8	Final
Nunavut (Hutchings) 🔨	1	0	0	0	1	0	X	X	2
Nova Scotia (Phillips)	0	4	0	4	0	3	X	X	11

==== Draw 5 ====
Tuesday, November 26, 6:00 pm

Sheet A	1	2	3	4	5	6	7	8	9	Final
Yukon (Dorosz)	0	0	1	0	2	0	2	1	1	7
Ontario (Shields) 🔨	3	1	0	1	0	1	0	0	0	6

Sheet B	1	2	3	4	5	6	7	8	Final
Quebec (Néron) 🔨	2	2	0	0	1	1	5	X	11
Northern Ontario (Larocque)	0	0	0	0	0	0	0	X	0

Sheet D	1	2	3	4	5	6	7	8	Final
British Columbia (Konyer) 🔨	0	3	0	1	0	0	X	X	4
Prince Edward Island (Morrow)	4	0	3	0	1	1	X	X	9

==== Draw 6 ====
Wednesday, November 27, 10:00 am

Sheet A	1	2	3	4	5	6	7	8	Final
Newfoundland and Labrador (Curtis)	0	1	0	1	0	1	X	X	3
Alberta (Dupont) 🔨	2	0	4	0	3	0	X	X	9

Sheet B	1	2	3	4	5	6	7	8	Final
New Brunswick (Comeau) 🔨	0	2	0	4	0	0	0	0	6
Manitoba (Andries)	1	0	1	0	1	2	1	2	8

Sheet E	1	2	3	4	5	6	7	8	Final
Ontario (Shields) 🔨	0	0	0	0	2	2	0	X	4
Saskatchewan (Tracey)	1	2	1	2	0	0	1	X	7

Sheet F	1	2	3	4	5	6	7	8	Final
Northwest Territories (Delorey)	0	2	0	0	0	0	0	X	2
Nova Scotia (Phillips) 🔨	1	0	2	1	1	3	2	X	10

==== Draw 7 ====
Wednesday, November 27, 2:00 pm

Sheet A	1	2	3	4	5	6	7	8	Final
Nunavut (Hutchings)	0	1	0	0	1	1	1	0	4
Northwest Territories (Delorey) 🔨	2	0	1	1	0	0	0	1	5

Sheet B	1	2	3	4	5	6	7	8	Final
Saskatchewan (Tracey) 🔨	0	1	1	0	0	2	0	0	4
Yukon (Dorosz)	1	0	0	0	3	0	1	2	7

Sheet D	1	2	3	4	5	6	7	8	Final
Quebec (Néron) 🔨	0	0	3	1	0	2	0	X	6
Manitoba (Andries)	1	2	0	0	1	0	6	X	10

Sheet F	1	2	3	4	5	6	7	8	Final
Alberta (Dupont) 🔨	2	2	1	1	0	3	X	X	9
British Columbia (Konyer)	0	0	0	0	2	0	X	X	2

==== Draw 8 ====
Wednesday, November 27, 6:00 pm

Sheet A	1	2	3	4	5	6	7	8	Final
Ontario (Shields) 🔨	0	3	0	0	1	2	0	X	6
Northern Ontario (Larocque)	1	0	0	0	0	0	1	X	1

Sheet B	1	2	3	4	5	6	7	8	Final
Nova Scotia (Phillips) 🔨	1	0	0	3	1	1	0	X	6
Prince Edward Island (Morrow)	0	3	0	0	0	0	1	X	4

Sheet E	1	2	3	4	5	6	7	8	Final
Yukon (Dorosz) 🔨	0	1	2	0	1	0	1	1	6
New Brunswick (Comeau)	1	0	0	2	0	2	0	0	5

Sheet F	1	2	3	4	5	6	7	8	Final
Newfoundland and Labrador (Curtis)	0	4	0	1	0	0	3	X	8
Nunavut (Hutchings) 🔨	1	0	2	0	0	1	0	X	4

==== Draw 9 ====
Thursday, November 28, 8:30 am

Sheet B	1	2	3	4	5	6	7	8	Final
Alberta (Dupont) 🔨	2	0	0	0	2	1	0	0	5
Nunavut (Hutchings)	0	1	2	1	0	0	2	1	7

Sheet C	1	2	3	4	5	6	7	8	Final
Manitoba (Andries) 🔨	0	0	0	4	0	2	0	0	6
Yukon (Dorosz)	0	1	1	0	1	0	2	2	7

==== Draw 10 ====
Thursday, November 28, 12:30 pm

Sheet C	1	2	3	4	5	6	7	8	9	Final
Ontario (Shields)	0	0	2	1	1	1	0	0	2	7
Quebec (Néron) 🔨	0	3	0	0	0	0	1	1	0	5

Sheet E	1	2	3	4	5	6	7	8	Final
Prince Edward Island (Morrow)	0	0	2	1	0	1	X	X	4
Newfoundland and Labrador (Curtis) 🔨	2	2	0	0	6	0	X	X	10

Sheet G	1	2	3	4	5	6	7	8	Final
British Columbia (Konyer)	0	1	0	1	0	2	1	0	5
Nova Scotia (Phillips) 🔨	0	0	3	0	3	0	0	2	8

Sheet H	1	2	3	4	5	6	7	8	9	Final
Northern Ontario (Larocque) 🔨	0	0	0	1	1	0	0	1	0	3
New Brunswick (Comeau)	0	0	1	0	0	2	0	0	2	5

==== Draw 11 ====
Thursday, November 28, 4:30 pm

Sheet B	1	2	3	4	5	6	7	8	Final
Northwest Territories (Delorey)	0	2	0	2	0	1	0	X	5
Newfoundland and Labrador (Curtis) 🔨	1	0	4	0	2	0	2	X	9

Sheet D	1	2	3	4	5	6	7	8	Final
Northern Ontario (Larocque)	0	0	1	0	2	1	0	1	5
Yukon (Dorosz) 🔨	1	0	0	2	0	0	1	0	4

Sheet F	1	2	3	4	5	6	7	8	Final
Saskatchewan (Tracey)	1	0	1	1	0	0	0	2	5
New Brunswick (Comeau) 🔨	0	1	0	0	1	2	0	0	4

Sheet G	1	2	3	4	5	6	7	8	Final
Prince Edward Island (Morrow) 🔨	1	3	4	2	1	2	X	X	13
Nunavut (Hutchings)	0	0	0	0	0	0	X	X	0

==== Draw 12 ====
Thursday, November 28, 8:30 pm

Sheet C	1	2	3	4	5	6	7	8	Final
British Columbia (Konyer)	1	1	0	2	2	2	X	X	8
Northwest Territories (Delorey) 🔨	0	0	1	0	0	0	X	X	1

Sheet D	1	2	3	4	5	6	7	8	Final
Nova Scotia (Phillips) 🔨	2	0	1	0	0	0	0	X	3
Alberta (Dupont)	0	3	0	1	1	3	4	X	12

Sheet G	1	2	3	4	5	6	7	8	9	Final
Manitoba (Andries)	0	1	0	2	0	4	0	0	0	7
Ontario (Shields) 🔨	3	0	1	0	1	0	1	1	2	9

Sheet H	1	2	3	4	5	6	7	8	Final
Quebec (Néron) 🔨	3	0	0	4	0	0	5	X	12
Saskatchewan (Tracey)	0	2	1	0	3	1	0	X	7

=== Championship round ===
==== A Bracket ====
Qualifier 1
A1	Alberta	7
B4	Ontario	4
A1	Alberta	11
B2	Yukon	1
B2	Yukon	6
A3	Newfoundland and Labrador	5

Qualifier 2
A2	Nova Scotia	7
B3	Saskatchewan	3
A2	Nova Scotia	6
B1	Quebec	5
B1	Quebec	10
A4	Prince Edward Island	3

==== B Bracket ====
			Qualifier 3
			B1	Quebec	5
B4	Ontario	8	B4	Ontario	4
A3	Newfoundland and Labrador	2

			Qualifier 4
			B2	Yukon	5
B3	Saskatchewan	9	B3	Saskatchewan	4
A4	Prince Edward Island	2

==== A Event ====
===== Semifinals =====
Friday, November 29, 9:00 am

Sheet E	1	2	3	4	5	6	7	8	Final
Alberta (Dupont) 🔨	1	0	0	0	2	2	0	2	7
Ontario (Shields)	0	1	0	1	0	0	2	0	4

Sheet F	1	2	3	4	5	6	7	8	Final
Quebec (Néron) 🔨	2	1	1	0	2	1	3	X	10
Prince Edward Island (Morrow)	0	0	0	3	0	0	0	X	3

Sheet G	1	2	3	4	5	6	7	8	Final
Yukon (Dorosz) 🔨	1	2	0	1	0	2	0	0	6
Newfoundland and Labrador (Curtis)	0	0	1	0	1	0	2	1	5

Sheet H	1	2	3	4	5	6	7	8	Final
Nova Scotia (Phillips) 🔨	0	3	2	2	0	0	0	X	7
Saskatchewan (Tracey)	0	0	0	0	1	1	1	X	3

===== Finals =====
Friday, November 29, 2:00 pm

Sheet C	1	2	3	4	5	6	7	8	Final
Alberta (Dupont) 🔨	2	0	3	1	5	X	X	X	11
Yukon (Dorosz)	0	1	0	0	0	X	X	X	1

Sheet D	1	2	3	4	5	6	7	8	Final
Nova Scotia (Phillips) 🔨	1	0	2	1	0	0	0	2	6
Quebec (Néron)	0	1	0	0	1	1	2	0	5

==== B Event ====
===== Semifinals =====
Friday, November 29, 2:00 pm

Sheet A	1	2	3	4	5	6	7	8	Final
Ontario (Shields)	0	2	0	3	1	2	X	X	8
Newfoundland and Labrador (Curtis) 🔨	0	0	2	0	0	0	X	X	2

Sheet B	1	2	3	4	5	6	7	8	Final
Saskatchewan (Tracey) 🔨	2	0	4	0	2	1	X	X	9
Prince Edward Island (Morrow)	0	0	0	2	0	0	X	X	2

===== Finals =====
Friday, November 29, 7:00 pm

Sheet E	1	2	3	4	5	6	7	8	Final
Yukon (Dorosz)	0	2	0	0	2	0	0	1	5
Saskatchewan (Tracey) 🔨	2	0	0	1	0	0	1	0	4

Sheet G	1	2	3	4	5	6	7	8	Final
Quebec (Néron) 🔨	0	0	2	0	1	0	0	2	5
Ontario (Shields)	0	1	0	2	0	1	0	0	4

=== Playoffs ===
Semifinals
1	Alberta	8
4	Yukon	3
2	Nova Scotia	7
3	Quebec	6

Final
1	Alberta	9
2	Nova Scotia	4

Bronze medal game
4	Yukon	5
3	Quebec	9

==== Semifinals ====
Saturday, November 30, 9:00 am

Sheet E	1	2	3	4	5	6	7	8	Final
Nova Scotia (Phillips) 🔨	1	0	0	0	5	0	0	1	7
Quebec (Néron)	0	1	1	1	0	3	0	0	6

Sheet G	1	2	3	4	5	6	7	8	Final
Alberta (Dupont) 🔨	1	1	0	2	0	2	2	X	8
Yukon (Dorosz)	0	0	1	0	2	0	0	X	3

==== Bronze medal game ====
Saturday, November 30, 2:00 pm

Sheet C	1	2	3	4	5	6	7	8	Final
Yukon (Dorosz)	0	0	0	0	3	0	2	0	5
Quebec (Néron) 🔨	2	1	1	2	0	2	0	1	9

==== Final ====
Saturday, November 30, 2:00 pm

Sheet A	1	2	3	4	5	6	7	8	Final
Alberta (Dupont) 🔨	1	0	0	4	0	2	2	X	9
Nova Scotia (Phillips)	0	2	0	0	2	0	0	X	4
