= Greg Wilson (curler) =

American curler

- Curler ♂
- Born: October 11, 1966 (age 60); Highland Park, Illinois, U.S.

Team
- Curling club: Hibbing CC, Minnesota, Chicago CC, Chicago

Curling career
- Member Association: United States
- World Championship: 1 (1998)
Medal record
Curling
United States Men's Championship
| Gold medal – first place | 1998 Bismarck |
| Silver medal – second place | 2000 Ogden |
| Bronze medal – third place | 2009 Broomfield |
United States Olympic Trials
| Bronze medal – third place | 2009 Broomfield |

Greg Wilson (born October 11, 1966, in Highland Park, Illinois) is an American curler from Vernon Hills, Illinois.

At the national level, he is a 1998 United States men's champion curler and a 2014 United States mixed champion curler.

== Teams ==
=== Men's ===
| Season | Skip | Third | Second | Lead | Alternate | Coach | Events |
|---|---|---|---|---|---|---|---|
| 1982–83 | Greg Wilson | ? | ? | ? | | | USJCC 1983 (???th) |
| 1994–95 | Greg Gallagher | Greg Wilson | Jim Wilson | Reggie Kerr | | | |
| 1994–95 | Greg Wilson | ? | ? | ? | | | USMCC 1995 (???th) |
| 1997–98 | Paul Pustovar | Dave Violette | Greg Wilson | Cory Ward | Shawn Rojeski (WCC) | Bill Tschirhart | USMCC 1998 (gold); WCC 1998 (6th) |
| 1998–99 | Paul Pustovar | Dave Violette | Greg Wilson | Mike Peplinski | | | |
| 1998–99 | Greg Wilson | ? | ? | ? | | | USMCC 1999 (4th) |
| 1999–00 | Paul Pustovar | Dave Violette | Mike Peplinski | Cory Ward | Greg Wilson | | |
| 1999–00 | Greg Wilson | ? | ? | ? | | | USMCC 2000 (silver) |
| 2002–03 | Greg Wilson | ? | ? | ? | | | USMCC 2003 (4th) |
| 2003–04 | Greg Wilson | Mike Thompson | Kurt Luhnes | Bob Wilson | | | |
| 2003–04 | Greg Wilson | ? | ? | ? | | | USMCC 2004 (???th) |
| 2004–05 | Paul Pustovar | Greg Wilson | Geoff Goodland | Richard Maskel | | | |
| 2005–06 | Paul Pustovar | Greg Wilson | Patrick Roe | Richard Maskel | | | USMCC 2006 (7th) |
| 2006–07 | Paul Pustovar | Greg Wilson | Patrick Roe | Richard Maskel | | | USMCC 2007 (6th) |
| 2008–09 | Todd Birr | Paul Pustovar | Greg Wilson | Kevin Birr | | | ACh 2009 (gold); USMCC 2009/ USOCT 2009 (5th) |
| 2011–12 | Greg Wilson | David Brown | Jeremy Roe | Richard Maskel | | | |

=== Mixed ===
| Season | Skip | Third | Second | Lead | Events |
|---|---|---|---|---|---|
| 1994–95 | Greg Wilson | ? | ? | ? | USMxCC 1995 (silver) |
| 1995–96 | Greg Wilson | ? | ? | ? | USMxCC 1996 (???th) |
| 1996–97 | Greg Wilson | ? | ? | ? | USMxCC 1997 (???th) |
| 1997–98 | Greg Wilson | ? | ? | ? | USMxCC 1998 (???th) |
| 2012–13 | Greg Wilson | Pam Wilson | Colin Rittgers | Michele Rittgers | USMxCC 2013 (8th) |
| 2013–14 | Greg Wilson | Pam Wilson | Colin Rittgers | Michele Rittgers | USMxCC 2014 (gold) |
| 2014–15 | Greg Wilson | Pam Wilson | Colin Rittgers | Michele Rittgers | USMxCC 2015 (6th) |
| 2015–16 | Greg Wilson | Stephanie Martin | Colin Rittgers | Pam Wilson | USMxCC 2016 (7th) |
| 2016–17 | Greg Wilson | Pam Wilson | Colin Rittgers | Michele Rittgers | USMxCC 2017 (9th) |

== Personal life ==
He started curling in 1975 at the age of 9. He is a third generation curler in the Chicago area. Most of his family curls. His wife, mom, dad and he have been to two Mixed Nationals together and are still curling in leagues together. Greg and his wife Pam won 2014 Mixed Nationals.

He graduated from the University of Wisconsin–Stevens Point (bachelor's degree) and DePaul University (master's degree).
