= Dave Violette =

American curler

- Curler ♂
- Born: December 5, 1963 (age 62); Portage, Wisconsin, U.S.

Team
- Curling club: Hibbing CC, Minnesota

Curling career
- Member Association: United States
- World Championship: 1 (1998)
Medal record
Curling
United States Men's Championship
Gold medal – first place	1998 Bismarck
Silver medal – second place	1995 Appleton
Silver medal – second place	2000 Ogden
Bronze medal – third place	2001 Madison

David Violette (born December 5, 1963) is an American curler from Plover, Wisconsin.

At the national level, he is a 1998 United States men's champion curler. He was a member of Team United States at the 1998 World Men's Curling Championship where they finished sixth.

== Personal life ==
Violette's parents curled and he began playing in a league at eleven years old. He earned a Bachelor of Science degree from University of Wisconsin–Stevens Point in 1986.

== Teams ==
Season	Skip	Third	Second	Lead	Alternate	Coach	Events
1994–95	Paul Pustovar (4th)	Dave Violette	Richard Maskel	Steve Brown (skip)			
1995–96	Paul Pustovar (4th)	Dave Violette	Richard Maskel	Steve Brown (skip)			
1996–97	Steve Brown	Dave Violette	Richard Maskel	Paul Pustovar			
1997–98	Paul Pustovar	Dave Violette	Greg Wilson	Cory Ward	Shawn Rojeski (WCC)	Bill Tschirhart	1998 USMCC (gold); 1998 WMCC (6th)
1998–99	Paul Pustovar	Dave Violette	Greg Wilson	Mike Peplinski			
1999–00	Paul Pustovar	Dave Violette	Mike Peplinski	Cory Ward	Greg Wilson		
2000–01	Paul Pustovar	Mike Peplinski	Dave Violette	Cory Ward	Doug Anderson		2001 USMCC (bronze)
2001–02	Paul Pustovar	Mike Peplinski	Dave Violette	Cory Ward	Doug Anderson	Mike Liapis	2001 USOCT (4th)
