= Paul Moffatt =

Canadian curler

- Curler
- Born: May 26, 1978 (age 48)

Team
- Curling club: KW Granite Club, Waterloo, ON
- Skip: Scott McDonald
- Third: Sam Steep
- Second: Oliver Campbell
- Lead: Paul Moffatt

Curling career
- Member Association: Ontario (1997–2001; 2006–present); Alberta (2003–2006)
- Grand Slam victories: 1 (2004 Players')
Medal record
Men's Curling
Representing Alberta
Canadian Olympic Trials
Bronze medal – third place	2005 Halifax	Men's

Paul Moffatt (born May 26, 1978) is a Canadian curler. He currently plays lead on Team Scott McDonald. Moffatt played for team John Morris from 2003 to 2006, where he won the 2004 Players' Championship Grand Slam, were runners up at the 2004 Canada Cup of Curling and were bronze medallists at the 2005 Canadian Olympic Curling Trials. He is also the winner of the 2019 Canadian Curling Club Championships.

When John Morris moved to Calgary in 2003, he formed a team with future Olympians Marc Kennedy and Kevin Koe, and with close friend Moffatt at lead. Moffatt's only major curling experience at the time was playing in the Ontario University Championship with Morris. At first the team kept secret who would be playing lead on the team, only revealing the name to be Pauldo Capones, which would later become Moffatt's nickname. While playing with Morris in Ontario, they actually entered a bonspiel in Brantford with Moffatt entered under that pseudonym. While in Calgary, Moffatt worked part-time as a teacher and as a bartender at the Last Straw Ale House in Tuscany, Calgary.

During his first season as part of the Morris rink, the team won three tour events, the 2003 Rainbow Cashspiel, the 2003 Best Western Wayside Inn Curling Classic, and the 2004 Players' Championship Grand Slam. The team were also quarterfinalists at the 2003 Masters Grand Slam and were runners up at the 2004 Canada Cup of Curling. At the 2004 Alberta men's provincial championship, the team finished 3–4.

During the 2004–05 season, the team played in all four slams, making it to the quarterfinals of the BDO Curling Classic, and the semifinals of the 2005 Canadian Open of Curling. They lost in a tiebreaker at the 2005 Canada Cup of Curling and lost in the quarterfinals of the 2005 Alberta provincial championships.

In his last season as a member of the Morris rink, the team won the 2005 Meyers Norris Penny Charity Classic. They also played in all four slams again, making it to the quarterfinals of the 2006 Masters and 2006 Players' Championship, and the finals of the 2006 BDO Classic Canadian Open. The team finished third at the 2005 Canadian Olympic Curling Trials, coming just two games away from qualifying for the 2006 Winter Olympics. The team also finished third at the 2006 Canada Cup of Curling. At the 2006 Alberta provincials, the team made it as far as the semifinals before losing.

After three seasons with the Morris rink, Moffatt moved back to Ontario to pursue a career as a teacher, and to be with his fiancé. In 2006, he joined the John Base rink at lead. The team played in all four slams, and made it to the semifinals of the 2006 Masters of Curling. The next season, Moffatt joined the Peter Corner rink. The team played in only one slam, the 2008 Masters of Curling (with John Epping sparing for Corner), where they missed the playoffs. The team played at the 2008 Ontario men's championship, losing in the final. After playing a season with Mike Harris, Moffatt played on the Kirk Ziola rink the next season, and went 2–8 at the 2010 Ontario Men's Curling Championship.

After leaving the Ziola rink, Moffatt would go on to play for Wayne Tuck Jr. and Daryl Shane before becoming a skip himself in 2018. Skipping a team of Ben Shane, John Gabel and Kyle Forster, Moffatt led the KW Granite Club to win the 2019 Canadian Curling Club Championships. Moffatt won his first tour event as a skip the 2020 KW Fall Classic.

== Personal life ==
Moffatt is a native of Kitchener, Ontario and is originally from Kingston, Ontario. He took Kinesiology and Physical education at Wilfrid Laurier University.

He is currently a teacher and Guidance Counsellor at Bluevale Collegiate Institute.
