= Todd Birr =

American curler

- Curler
- Born: April 20, 1968 (age 58); Mankato, Minnesota, U.S.

Team
- Curling club: Four Seasons CC, Blaine, MN
- Mixed doubles partner: Regan Birr

Curling career
- Member Association: United States
- World Championship: 1 (2007)
Medal record
Men's curling
Representing the United States
World Curling Championships
Bronze medal – third place	2007 Edmonton
United States Olympic Curling Trials
Bronze medal – third place	2009 Broomfield
Bronze medal – third place	2017 Omaha
United States Men's Curling Championship
Gold medal – first place	2007 Utica
Silver medal – second place	2017 Everett
Bronze medal – third place	2009 Broomfield
Bronze medal – third place	2011 Fargo
Bronze medal – third place	2018 Fargo
Bronze medal – third place	2019 Kalamazoo

Todd Birr (born April 20, 1968) is an American curler. He was a bronze medalist at the 2007 World Men's Curling Championship.

== Career ==
Birr skipped his team to victory at the 2007 United States Curling Men's Championships, beating out teams such as Olympic bronze medalist Pete Fenson and former national champion Jason Larway in the process. He had relative success in prior nationals finishing fourth in 2006 and as a semi-finalist in 2004.

His victory qualified his team of Bill Todhunter, Greg Johnson and Kevin Birr to a berth at the 2007 Ford World Men's Curling Championship representing team USA. There, Birr's was the only team to defeat Glenn Howard's Canadian team in the round robin when Howard wrecked on his last rock, and Birr bumped out a Canadian stone to score three giving him a victory. USA finished second behind Canada going into the playoffs. However, in the playoffs Birr lost 7–2 to Canada in the 1 vs 2 page playoff game, and then lost in the semi-final to Germany's Andy Kapp rink by a score of 6–4 earning Birr and the rest of team USA a bronze medal.

In 2009, Birr skipped the U.S. team to a three game sweep over the Brazil national team at the first ever Americas Challenge to determine the second American berth at the 2009 Ford World Men's Curling Championship.

Birr works as icemaker at The Four Seasons Curling Club in Blaine, Minnesota.

== Teams ==
Season	Skip	Third	Second	Lead	Alternate	Coach	Events
2001–02	Todd Birr	Doug Roy	Kevin Birr	Greg Rheaume			2002 USMCC (DNQ)
2003–04	Todd Birr	Pete Westberg	Kevin Birr	Greg Rheaume			2004 USMCC (SF)
2004–05	Todd Birr	Pete Westberg	Kevin Birr	Greg Rheaume			
2005–06	Todd Birr	Doug Pottinger	Kevin Birr	Pete Westberg			2006 US World Trials (4th)
2006–07	Todd Birr	Bill Todhunter	Greg Johnson	Kevin Birr	Zach Jacobson	Paul Pustovar	2007 USMCC (gold); 2007 WMCC (bronze)
2007–08	Todd Birr	Bill Todhunter	Greg Johnson	Kevin Birr	Paul Pustovar (USMCC)		2007 Cont. Cup (gold); 2008 USMCC (8th)
2008–09	Todd Birr	Paul Pustovar	Greg Wilson	Kevin Birr			2009 USMCC/USOCT (bronze)
2009–10	Todd Birr	Paul Pustovar	Tom O'Connor	Kevin Birr			2010 USMCC (7th)
2010–11	Todd Birr	Greg Romaniuk	Doug Pottinger	Tom O'Connor	Kevin Birr		2011 USMCC (bronze)
2011–12	Todd Birr	Greg Romaniuk	Doug Pottinger	Tom O'Connor	Kevin Birr		2012 USMCC (6th)
2012–13	Todd Birr	Doug Pottinger	Greg Romaniuk	Tom O'Connor	Kevin Birr		2012 USMCC (8th)
2013–14	Todd Birr	Doug Pottinger	Tom O'Connor	Troy Schroeder			
2014–15	Todd Birr	Doug Pottinger	Greg Johnson	Tom O'Connor			
2015–16	Todd Birr	Doug Pottinger	John Benton	Tom O'Connor			2016 USMCC (5th)
2016–17	Todd Birr	Rich Ruohonen	John Benton	Tom O'Connor			2017 USMCC (silver)
2017–18	Todd Birr	John Benton	Hunter Clawson	Tom O'Connor			2018 USMCC (bronze)
2018–19	Todd Birr	Greg Johnson	Hunter Clawson	Tom O'Connor			2019 USMCC (bronze)
2019–20	Todd Birr	Andrew Stopera	Hunter Clawson	Tom O'Connor			2020 USMCC (8th)
