= Paul Pustovar =

American curler

- Curler
- Born: December 17, 1951 (age 74); Chisholm, Minnesota, U.S.

Team
- Curling club: Hibbing CC, Hibbing, Minnesota
- Skip: Paul Pustovar
- Third: Nick Myers
- Second: Andy Jukich
- Lead: Jeff Puleo

Curling career
- World Championship: 6 (1977, 1980, 1984, 1991, 1998, 2002)
Medal record
Curling
Representing United States
World Curling Championships
Bronze medal – third place	1977 Karlstad	Team
Bronze medal – third place	1991 Winnipeg	Team
United States Men's Curling Championship
Gold medal – first place	1977 Northbrook	Team
Gold medal – first place	1980 Bemidji	Team
Gold medal – first place	1991 Utica	Team
Gold medal – first place	1998 Bismarck	Team
Gold medal – first place	2002 Eveleth	Team
Silver medal – second place	1982 Brookline	Team
Silver medal – second place	1992 Grafton	Team
Silver medal – second place	1995 Appleton	Team
Silver medal – second place	2000 Ogden	Team
World Senior Curling Championships
Gold medal – first place	2010 Chelyabinsk	Team
Silver medal – second place	2009 Dunedin	Team
United States Olympic Curling Trials
Bronze medal – third place	2009 Broomfield	Team

Paul Pustovar (born December 17, 1951, in Chisholm, Minnesota) is an American curler from Hibbing, Minnesota. He is one of the most prolific curlers from the United States, with over thirty years of experience. He has earned two bronze medals at the World Curling Championships and has earned five gold medals, four silver medals, and one bronze medal in the twenty-five national championships that he has participated in. He is also a former world senior champion.

== Early life ==
Pustovar studied at the University of Minnesota Duluth and earned his bachelor's degree in education. He earned his master's degree from Minnesota State University, Mankato then called Mankato State University in curriculum and instruction. After college, he taught a biology course at the Hibbing Community College and created and taught a curling course at the community college.

== Career ==
=== 1970s–1980s ===
Pustovar began curling in 1969. As third under Bruce Roberts he became the Minnesota state men's champion in 1977, and went on to win the nationals and earn a spot in the 1977 Air Canada Silver Broom, where the Americans placed fourth. Pustovar was named the All-Star Vice Skip at the 1977 Air Canada Silver Broom. He continued to be a major force in Minnesota, winning the state championships in 1980, 1982, and 1987. He became the national champion in 1980 and finished fourth in the 1980 World Championship. He made appearances at the 1985 United States Mixed Nationals and the 1982 and 1987 United States National Championships.

=== 1990s–2005 ===
Pustovar continued his success in curling through the end of the century. He participated in various national and international events and won many of those events. He was the Wisconsin state men's champion in 1991, 1992, 1994, 1996, 1998, 2000, and 2001. He earned various trophies, including the Remo Trophy in 1991, the Wettinger Nokia Trophy in 1994 and 1996, and the Movado Trophy in 1999, 2000, 2002, and 2003. In the 2000–01 curling season, he won eight events, which was a major achievement for him. He participated in the World Curling Tour and won, among others, the St. Paul Cash Spiel in 2003 and 2005 and the Duluth Cash Spiel in 2005. He continued to participate in the United States National Championships, finishing in the semifinals in 1990, 1994, 1996, 1997, 1999, and 2001 and finishing as runner-up in 1992, 1995, and 2000. He won the championship in 1991 and 2002, and placed third and fourth, respectively. He and his team participated in the inaugural Continental Cup of Curling and helped North America defeat Europe by a small margin. He and his team also participated in the 2001 United States Olympic Curling Trials, but failed to win the trials. He also represented the United States at the Karuizawa International Curling Championship, where he won the bonspiel title.

=== 2006–present ===
In 2006, Pustovar turned 50 and was allowed to participate in senior curling events. He has participated in every senior national championships since 2005, winning in 2009 and 2010 and earning a spot in the World Senior Curling Championships. He medalled in both years, earning a silver medal after a loss to Canada in 2009 and earning a gold medal after a win over Canada in 2010. Pustovar continued to participate in national events as well. He participated in the 2006 and 2007 national championships, but was not as successful as in previous years, placing 7th and 6th, respectively. He participated in the 2010 Olympic Trials with Todd Birr, but did not get a chance to represent the United States, finishing third. He also participated in the 2010 national championships. In 2011, he teamed up with Matt Hamilton in an attempt to win the nationals. He and his team participated in the Medford Qualifier and finished sixth, earning a spot in the challenge round. There, he and his team finished third, earning them a berth in the nationals. However, Pustovar was not able to participate in the nationals, so he sat out as the alternate while Hamilton took over skipping duties. They finished seventh with a 3–6 win–loss record. In 2012, Pustovar and a new team played in the Green Bay Qualifier, but placed fourth and missed the cutoff. However, he earned a spot in the challenge round through his Order of Merit ranking, and finished sixth, failing to qualify for the nationals. In 2014 (Nationals in Aston, PA) and 2015 (Nationals in Kalamazoo, MI), with new teams for each event, he also qualified for the nationals via the challenge round.

=== Coaching career ===
Pustovar is a certified Level II curling instructor and coach. He has coached many curling teams throughout his career, including the 1979 Minnesota Junior Men's Champions at the Junior National Championships. He was the coach of the Todd Birr rink at the 2007 Ford World Men's Curling Championship, where the United States won a bronze medal.

== Personal life ==
Pustovar is a self-employed insurance agent with the C.R. Pustovar Insurance Agency in Hibbing, MN. He is married to Carole and has two sons, Scott and Ryan, and three grandchildren, Alex, Taylor, and Tanner. Pustovar is an avid bicycler and has led bicycle tours in the United States, Europe, and Asia. He also enjoys fishing and traveling.

== Teammates ==
Season	Skip	Third	Second	Lead	Alternate	Events
1976–77	Bruce Roberts	Paul Pustovar	Jerry Scott	Gary Kleffman		1977 USMCC, 1977 WMCC
1979–80	Paul Pustovar	John Jankila	Gary Kleffman	Jerry Scott		1980 USMCC, 1980 WMCC
1990–91	Steve Brown	Paul Pustovar	George Godfrey	Wally Henry	Mike Fraboni	1991 USMCC, 1991 WMCC
1996–97	Steve Brown	Dave Violette	Richard Maskel	Paul Pustovar		
1997–98	Paul Pustovar	Dave Violette	Greg Wilson	Cory Ward	Shawn Rojeski	1998 USMCC, 1998 WMCC
1998–99	Paul Pustovar	Dave Violette	Greg Wilson	Mike Peplinski		
1999–00	Paul Pustovar	Dave Violette	Mike Peplinski	Cory Ward		
2001–02	Paul Pustovar	Mike Fraboni	Geoff Goodland	Richard Maskel		2002 USMCC, 2002 WMCC
2007–08	Todd Birr	Bill Todhunter	Greg Johnson	Kevin Birr	Paul Pustovar	2008 USMCC
2008–09	Paul Pustovar	Brian Simonson	Tom Harms	Don Mohawk		2009 WSCC
2009–10	Paul Pustovar	Brian Simonson	Tom Harms	Don Mohawk		2010 WSCC
2010–11	Paul Pustovar	Jeremy Roe	Matt Hamilton	Patrick Roe		2011 USMCC
2011–12	Paul Pustovar	Nick Myers	Andy Jukich	Jeff Puleo		
2012–13	Paul Pustovar	Brian Simonson	John Kokotovich	Don Mohawk		

== Awards and honors ==
- United States Curling Association and United States Olympic Committee Male Curling Athlete of the Year: 2002, 1998
- United States Olympic Committee's Team of the Month: April 2010
- Inducted into the United States Curling Hall of Fame in 2009
