= Bill Todhunter =

American male curler and coach

- Curler ♂
- Born: October 10, 1959 (age 67); Cranbrook, British Columbia, Canada

Team
- Curling club: Appleton CC, Mankato CC, Minnesota

Curling career
- Member Association: United States
- World Championship: 2 (2004, 2007)
Medal record
Curling
World Championships
Bronze medal – third place	2007 Edmonton
United States Men's Championship
Gold medal – first place	2004 Grand Forks
Gold medal – first place	2007 Utica

Bill Todhunter (born October 10, 1959, in Cranbrook, British Columbia, Canada) is an American curler and curling coach from Fort Lauderdale, Florida.

He is a 2007 World Men's bronze medallist and a two-time US Men's champion (2004, 2007).

== Teams ==
Season	Skip	Third	Second	Lead	Alternate	Coach	Events
1999–00	Doug Pottinger	Troy Schroeder	Greg Johnson	Bill Todhunter	Kurt Johnson		USMCC 2000 (DNQ)
2001–02	Doug Pottinger	Troy Schroeder	Greg Johnson	Bill Todhunter	Nate Gebert		USOCT 2001 (5th)
2003–04	Jason Larway	Doug Pottinger	Joel Larway	Bill Todhunter	Doug Kauffman	Don Pottinger	USMCC 2004 (gold); WCC 2004 (9th)
2004–05	Jason Larway	Doug Pottinger	Joel Larway	Bill Todhunter			CCC 2004 (gold); USOCT 2005 (7th)
2005–06	Troy Schroeder	Bill Todhunter	Greg Johnson	Sean Silver			
2006–07	Todd Birr	Bill Todhunter	Greg Johnson	Kevin Birr	Zach Jacobson	Paul Pustovar	USMCC 2007 (gold); WCC 2007 (bronze)
2007–08	Todd Birr	Bill Todhunter	Greg Johnson	Kevin Birr	Paul Pustovar (USMCC)		CCC 2007 (gold); USMCC 2008 (8th)
2008–09	Jason Larway	Colin Hufman	Joel Larway	Bill Todhunter	Greg Johnson		
2011–12	Bill Todhunter	Ryan Meyer	Nik Geller	Craig LaBrec			

== Record as a coach of national teams ==
Year	Tournament, event	National team	Place
2010	2010 World Women's Curling Championship	United States (women)	5
2013	2013 World Women's Curling Championship	United States (women)	4
2014	2014 Winter Olympics	United States (women)	10

== Private life ==
Bill Todhunter resides in Fort Lauderdale, Florida. Outside of curling he works as Regional sales manager for Beghelli. Before moving to Florida, he lived in Menasha, Wisconsin.

He started curling in 1974, when he was 19 years old.
