= Kevin Birr =

American curler

- Curler ♂
- Born: December 6, 1969 (age 56); Mankato, Minnesota, United States

Team
- Curling club: Caledonian CC, Mankato, Minnesota

Curling career
- Member Association: United States
- World Championship: 1 (2007)
Medal record
Curling
World Championships
Bronze medal – third place	2007 Edmonton
United States Men's Championship
Gold medal – first place	2007 Utica
Bronze medal – third place	2004 Grand Forks
Bronze medal – third place	2011 Fargo

Kevin Birr (born December 6, 1969, in Mankato, Minnesota, United States) is an American curler.

He is a 2007 World Men's bronze medallist and a 2007 US Men's champion.

== Teams ==
=== Men's ===
Season	Skip	Third	Second	Lead	Alternate	Coach	Events
1988–89	Kevin Birr	?	?	?			USJCC 1989 (bronze)
2001–02	Todd Birr	Doug Roy	Kevin Birr	Greg Rheaume			USMCC 2002 (13th)
2003–04	Todd Birr	Pete Westberg	Kevin Birr	Greg Rheaume			USMCC 2004 (bronze)
2004–05	Todd Birr	Pete Westberg	Kevin Birr	Greg Rheaume			
2005–06	Todd Birr	Doug Pottinger	Pete Westberg	Kevin Birr			USMCC 2006 (4th)
2006–07	Todd Birr	Bill Todhunter	Greg Johnson	Kevin Birr	Zach Jacobson	Paul Pustovar	USMCC 2007 (gold); WCC 2007 (bronze)
2007–08	Todd Birr	Bill Todhunter	Greg Johnson	Kevin Birr	Paul Pustovar (USMCC)		CCC 2007 (gold); USMCC 2008 (8th)
2008–09	Todd Birr	Paul Pustovar	Greg Wilson	Kevin Birr			AC 2009 (gold)
2009–10	Todd Birr	Paul Pustovar	Tom O'Connor	Kevin Birr			
2010–11	Todd Birr	Greg Romaniuk	Doug Pottinger	Tom O'Connor	Kevin Birr		USMCC 2011 (bronze)
2011–12	Todd Birr	Greg Romaniuk	Doug Pottinger	Tom O'Connor	Kevin Birr		USMCC 2012 (6th)
2012–13	Todd Birr	Greg Romaniuk	Doug Pottinger	Tom O'Connor	Kevin Birr		USMCC 2013 (9th)

=== Mixed ===
Season	Skip	Third	Second	Lead	Events
2000	Todd Birr	Linda Shimmin	Kevin Birr	Tracy Christensen	USMxCC 2000 (silver)
2003	Todd Birr	Nicole Rheaume	Kevin Birr	Kim Rheaume	USMxCC 2003 (bronze)

== Private life ==
Kevin Birr resides in St. Peter, Minnesota. He works as catering manager at Gustavus Adolphus College.

He graduated from Minnesota State University, Mankato.

His older brother Todd is a curler too; they played together many years.

He started curling in 1984, when he was 15 years old.
