= Andreas Kempf =

German curler (born 1967)

Medal record

Men's Curling

World Curling Championships
Silver medal – second place	2007 Edmonton	
Bronze medal – third place	2005 Victoria	

European Curling Championships
Bronze medal – third place	2008 Örnsköldsvik	

Andreas "Kempfi" Kempf (born 4 June 1967) is a German curler from Munich. He currently plays lead for the German national team, skipped by Andy Kapp.

Kempf originally played lead for the Roland Jentsch rink, but moved to the Kapp rink in 2005. He shared the lead duties with Holger Höhne, on this five-player team. He won a bronze medal at the 2005 Ford World Men's Curling Championship and a silver at the 2007 Ford World Men's Curling Championship. For the 2008-09 season, the team reverted to a four-player team. Kempf would be the odd man out for the 2008 European Curling Championships, which he went to as an alternate, but did not play any games. Third Uli Kapp did not go to the 2009 Ford World Men's Curling Championship, so Kempf was promoted to the team's lead.
