= Uli Kapp =

German curler (born 1971)

- Curler
- Born: Ulrich Kapp; 14 April 1971 (age 55); Füssen, Germany

Curling career
- World Championship: 7 (1994, 1995, 1997, 1999, 2001, 2005, 2007)
- European Championship: 11 (1991, 1992, 1993, 1994, 1995, 1997, 2000, 2005, 2007, 2008, 2009)
- Olympic: 2 (1998, 2006)
Medal record
Men's Curling
World Curling Championships
Silver medal – second place	1997 Berne
Silver medal – second place	2007 Edmonton
Bronze medal – third place	1994 Oberstdorf
Bronze medal – third place	1995 Brandon
Bronze medal – third place	2005 Victoria
European Curling Championships
Gold medal – first place	1991 Chamonix
Gold medal – first place	1992 Perth
Gold medal – first place	1997 Füssen
Bronze medal – third place	2008 Örnsköldsvik

Ulrich "Uli" Kapp (born 14 April 1971 in Füssen) is a retired German curler from Übersee.

== Career ==
Kapp has played third for his brother Andy Kapp since 1992. Together, they have won European Curling Championships (1992 and 1997), two silver medals at the World Curling Championships (1997, 2007) and three bronze medals (1994, 1995 and 2005). He competed for Germany at the 1998 and 2006 Winter Olympics, finishing in eighth place on both occasions. Kapp had to have season-ending knee surgery after the 2007 European Curling Championships, and thus could not attend the 2008 World Men's Curling Championship with the rest of his team. He retired from professional curling in 2009.

Kapp has worked as a curling commentator for Eurosport for over 10 years.

== Personal life ==
Kapp has two children. He has a Magister Juris and works as a sport business consultant. He enjoys reading, travelling, biking, and gardening.
