= Andy Kapp =

German curler (born 1967)

Andreas Kapp
- Curler
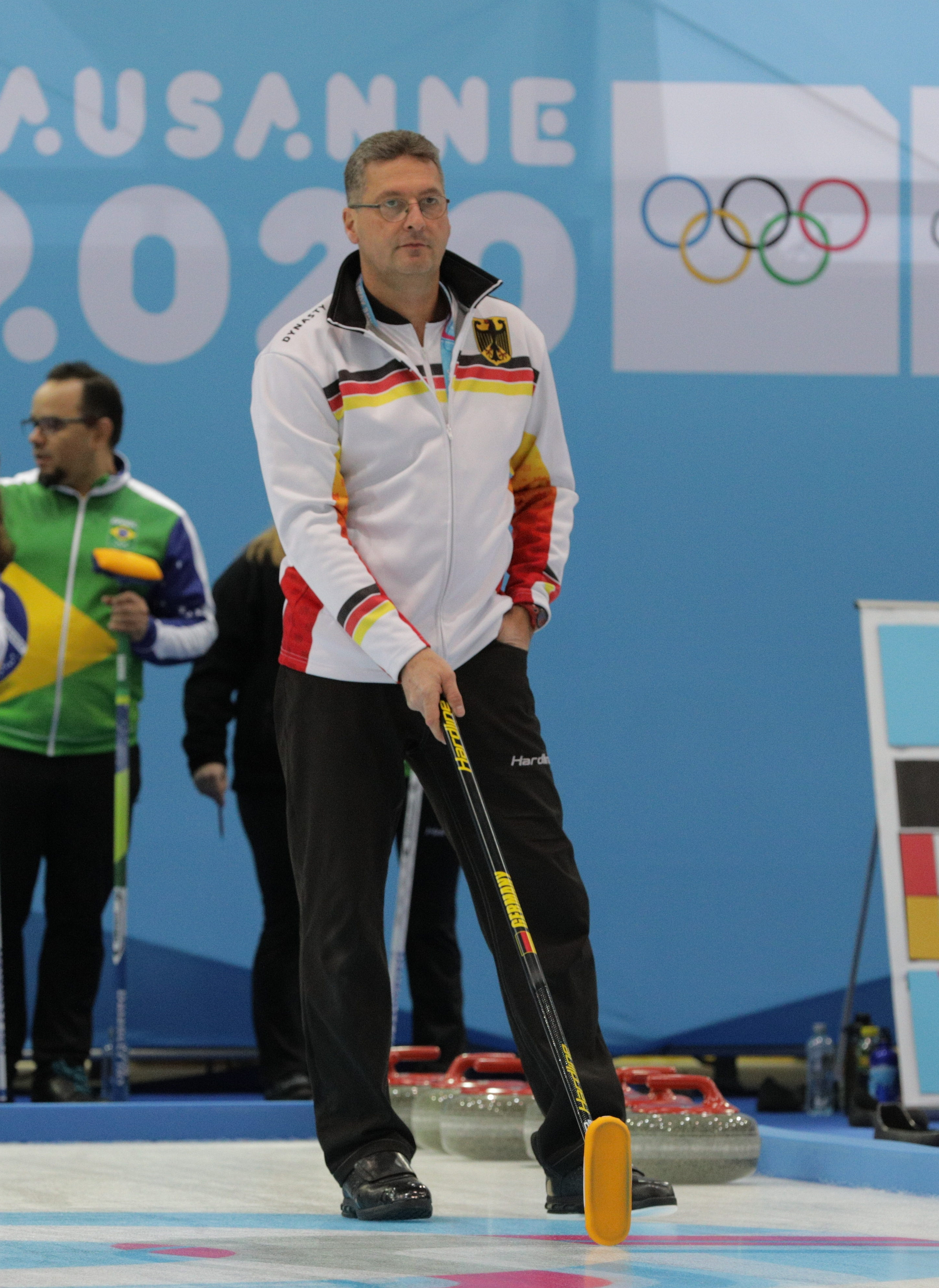
- Born: 8 December 1967 (age 58); Sonthofen, West Germany

Team
- Curling club: CC Füssen, Füssen, GER

Curling career
- World Championship: 14 (1989, 1990, 1991, 1994, 1995, 1997, 1999, 2001, 2005, 2007, 2008, 2009, 2010, 2011)
- European Championship: 12 (1992, 1993, 1994, 1995, 1997, 2000, 2005, 2007, 2008, 2009, 2010, 2016)
- World Senior Curling Championship: 1 (2024)
- Olympic: 4 (1988, 1998, 2006, 2010)
Medal record
Men's Curling
World Curling Championships
Silver medal – second place	1997 Berne
Silver medal – second place	2007 Edmonton
Bronze medal – third place	1994 Oberstdorf
Bronze medal – third place	1995 Brandon
Bronze medal – third place	2005 Victoria
World Mixed Championship
Silver medal – second place	2019 Aberdeen
European Curling Championships
Gold medal – first place	1992 Perth
Gold medal – first place	1997 Füssen
Bronze medal – third place	2008 Örnsköldsvik
European Mixed Championship
Gold medal – first place	2013 Edinburgh

Andreas "Andy" Kapp (born 8 December 1967) is a German curler from Unterthingau. After participating in several tournaments at the Junior, Olympic, and World Championship levels, Kapp surprised many by winning the 1992 European championship. The following year, he finished 7th at the European Championships, but at the 1994 World Championships, he and his team won the bronze medal. The next year, Kapp won another bronze medal. In 1997, at the World Championships, Kapp achieved his best showing by leading his team to a silver medal, losing to Sweden's Peja Lindholm in the final. In December of the same year, Kapp won his second European Championship, shortly before the first official medal event for curling at the 1998 Nagano Olympics. However, he had a disappointing 1998 Olympics, where, as one of the top medal favorites, he finished 1-6, placing last in the 8-team field.

In the following years, Kapp was representing Germany at World- and European Championships with no podiumplaces. From 2002 the emergence of young German star Sebastian Stock started a new chapter in German curling, and the country's representative at most major events such as Europeans, Worlds, and Olympics were not the Kapp brothers anymore. However, in 2005 Kapp was back, at the 2005 Ford World Men's Curling Championship, and won a bronze medal after play-off losses to Scotland's David Murdoch and Canada's Randy Ferbey. In the semifinal against Ferbey, Uli shockingly playing the wrong turn altogether on his first shot in the final end, up 6-5 without hammer, leading to a disastrous miss and putting Germany in a near-impossible position for the remainder of the end and leading to their loss, with Ferbey scoring 3. He appeared in his second Olympics in Turin in 2006 finishing out of playoff contention at 3-6.

Two years later, at the 2007 Ford World Men's Curling Championship, Kapp skipped Germany to another silver medal, losing to Canada's Glenn Howard in the final 8-3. The team returned to the 2008 World Men's Curling Championship without Andy's brother (and regular third) Uli, who was sidelined by season-ending knee surgery. Nevertheless, the team got off to a 4-0 start before fading and finishing in 8th place with a 5-6 record. Kapp (again without Uli) competed at a third Olympics for Germany in 2010 in Vancouver, this time finished with his best ever Olympic record of 4-5, missing a tiebreaker to get into the playoffs by just 1 game. He played 2011 his 14th and last World Men´s Championship in Regina/Canada and fished 6th place. After that Kapp did win the European Mixed Championship 2013 with Pia-Lisa Schöll, Holger, Höhne and Petra Tschetsch and finished 5th at the World Mixed Championship 2015 and 2016. He is now coach of the National Junior programme in Germany.

Kapp was the coach of the German men's team at the 2019 World Men's Curling Championship; his 16-year-old son Benjamin Kapp was an alternate on the team and the youngest player in the event.

Teammates (1992-2005)

- Uli Kapp (third)
- Oliver Axnick (second)
- Holger Höhne (lead)

Teammates (as of 2007)

- Uli Kapp (third)
- Andreas Lang (second)
- Andreas Kempf (lead)
- Holger Höhne (alternate)

Teammates at the 2010 Vancouver Winter Olympics

- Andreas Lang (third)
- Holger Höhne (second)
- Andreas Kempf (lead)
- Daniel Herberg (alternate)
