= 2018 Meridian Canadian Open =

Grand Slam of Curling event

- Host city: Camrose, Alberta
- Arena: Encana Arena
- Dates: January 16–21
- Men's winner: (Switzerland) Team de Cruz
- Curling club: CC Genève, Geneva
- Skip: Peter de Cruz
- Fourth: Benoît Schwarz
- Third: Claudio Pätz
- Lead: Valentin Tanner
- Finalist: (Sweden) Niklas Edin
- Women's winner: (Alberta) Team Carey
- Curling club: The Glencoe Club, Calgary
- Skip: Chelsea Carey
- Third: Cathy Overton-Clapham
- Second: Jocelyn Peterman
- Lead: Laine Peters
- Finalist: (Manitoba) Michelle Englot

The 2018 Meridian Canadian Open was held from January 16–21 at the Encana Arena in Camrose, Alberta. This was the fourth Grand Slam of Curling event and third "major" of the 2017–18 curling season.

In the Men's final Peter de Cruz and his team from Geneva, Switzerland won their first Grand Slam title and the first by a Swiss men's team. They also became just the third non-Canadian team to win a Grand Slam as they defeated Niklas Edin. This marked the second straight Grand Slam event in which two non-Canadian men's teams contested the final.

In the Women's final Chelsea Carey and her rink from Calgary won their first Grand Slam title of the season, the second of Carey's career, as they defeated Michelle Englot who was looking to win her first Grand Slam title since 2008.

== Men ==
=== Teams ===
| Skip | Third | Second | Lead | Locale | OOM Ranking |
|---|---|---|---|---|---|
| Steve Laycock (Note: Steve Laycock replaced Brendan Bottcher.) | Darren Moulding | Bradley Thiessen | Karrick Martin | Edmonton, Alberta | 12 |
| Benoit Schwarz (Fourth) | Claudio Pätz | Peter de Cruz (Skip) | Valentin Tanner | Geneva, Switzerland | 5 |
| Reid Carruthers | Braeden Moskowy | Derek Samagalski | Colin Hodgson | Winnipeg, Manitoba | 7 |
| Niklas Edin | Oskar Eriksson | Rasmus Wranå | Christoffer Sundgren | Karlstad, Sweden | 2 |
| John Epping | Mat Camm | Pat Janssen | Tim March | Toronto, Ontario | 13 |
| Brad Gushue | Mark Nichols | Brett Gallant | Geoff Walker | St. John's, Newfoundland and Labrador | 1 |
| Brad Jacobs | Ryan Fry | E. J. Harnden | Ryan Harnden | Sault Ste. Marie, Ontario | 10 |
| Kevin Koe | Marc Kennedy | Brent Laing | Ben Hebert | Calgary, Alberta | 3 |
| Jason Gunnlaugson | Alex Forrest | Ian McMillan | Connor Njegovan | Winnipeg, Manitoba | 6 |
| Kim Chang-min | Seong Se-hyeon | Oh Eun-soo | Lee Ki-bok | Uiseong, South Korea | 8 |
| Liu Rui | Xu Xiaoming | Jiang Dongxu | Zang Jialiang | Harbin, China | 11 |
| Mike McEwen | B. J. Neufeld | Matt Wozniak | Denni Neufeld | Winnipeg, Manitoba | 4 |
| John Morris | Matt Dunstone (Note: Matt Dunstone replaced Jim Cotter.) | Catlin Schneider | Don Bartlett (Note: Don Bartlett replaced Tyrel Griffith.) | Vernon, British Columbia | 29 |
| John Shuster | Tyler George | Matt Hamilton | John Landsteiner | (United States) Duluth, Minnesota | 20 |
| Bruce Mouat | Grant Hardie | Bobby Lammie | Hammy McMillan Jr. | Edinburgh, Scotland | 9 |
| Thomas Ulsrud | Torger Nergård | Håvard Vad Petersson | Christoffer Svae | Oslo, Norway | 14 |

=== Knockout Draw Brackets ===
==== A Event ====
| First Knockout | | Semifinals | | Qualifier 1 |
| (South Korea) Kim Chang-min | 4 |
| (Newfoundland and Labrador) Brad Gushue | 9 | (Newfoundland and Labrador) Brad Gushue | 3 |
| (Norway) Thomas Ulsrud | 3 | (Switzerland) Peter de Cruz | 5 |
| (Switzerland) Peter de Cruz | 6 | | | (Switzerland) Peter de Cruz | 3 |
| (China) Liu Rui | 3 | | | (Ontario) Brad Jacobs | 6 |
| (Ontario) Brad Jacobs | 7 | (Ontario) Brad Jacobs | 7 |
| (Manitoba) Mike McEwen | 6 | (Manitoba) Mike McEwen | 3 |
| (Alberta) Team Bottcher | 1 |

| First Knockout | | Semifinals | | Qualifier 2 |
| (Sweden) Niklas Edin | 5 |
| (United States) John Shuster | 6 | (United States) John Shuster | 5 |
| (British Columbia) John Morris | 3 | (Ontario) John Epping | 6 |
| (Ontario) John Epping | 5 | | | (Ontario) John Epping | 7 |
| (Alberta) Kevin Koe | 4 | | | (Manitoba) Jason Gunnlaugson | 8 |
| (Scotland) Bruce Mouat | 6 | (Scotland) Bruce Mouat | 4 |
| (Manitoba) Jason Gunnlaugson | 9 | (Manitoba) Jason Gunnlaugson | 6 |
| (Manitoba) Reid Carruthers | 3 |

==== B event ====
| Second Knockout | | Semifinals | | Qualifier 3 |
| (South Korea) Kim Chang-min | 2 |
| (Norway) Thomas Ulsrud | 5 | (Norway) Thomas Ulsrud | 2 |
| (China) Liu Rui | 3 | (Alberta) Team Bottcher | 5 |
| (Alberta) Team Bottcher | 6 | | | (Alberta) Team Bottcher | 8 |
| | | | | (Ontario) John Epping | 1 |

| Second Knockout | | Semifinals | | Qualifier 4 |
| (Sweden) Niklas Edin | 7 |
| (British Columbia) John Morris | 4 | (Sweden) Niklas Edin | 4 |
| (Alberta) Kevin Koe | 6 | (Manitoba) Reid Carruthers | 8 |
| (Manitoba) Reid Carruthers | 7 | | | (Manitoba) Reid Carruthers | 3 |
| | | | | (Switzerland) Peter de Cruz | 8 |

| Second Knockout | | Qualifier 5 |
| (Newfoundland and Labrador) Brad Gushue | 3 |
| (Manitoba) Mike McEwen | 6 | (Manitoba) Mike McEwen | 6 |
| (Scotland) Bruce Mouat | 8 | (Scotland) Bruce Mouat | 1 |
| (United States) John Shuster | 5 |

==== C Event ====
| Third Knockout | | Semifinals | | Qualifier 6 |
| (South Korea) Kim Chang-min | 5 |
| (China) Liu Rui | 4 | (South Korea) Kim Chang-min | 3 |
| | | (United States) John Shuster | 6 |
| | | | | (United States) John Shuster | 3 |
| | | | | (Manitoba) Reid Carruthers | 9 |

| Third Knockout | | Semifinals | | Qualifier 7 |
| (British Columbia) John Morris | 5 |
| (Alberta) Kevin Koe | 6 | (Alberta) Kevin Koe | 7 |
| | | (Newfoundland and Labrador) Brad Gushue | 6 |
| | | | | (Alberta) Kevin Koe | 7 |
| | | | | (Ontario) John Epping | 4 |

| Third Knockout | | Qualifier 8 |
| (Norway) Thomas Ulsrud | 5 |
| (Sweden) Niklas Edin | 6 | (Sweden) Niklas Edin | 8 |
| | | (Scotland) Bruce Mouat | 7 |

=== Playoffs ===
Quarterfinals
1 | (Ontario) Brad Jacobs | 7
8 | (Manitoba) Reid Carruthers | 3
4 | (Switzerland) Peter de Cruz | 7
5 | (Alberta) Team Bottcher | 6
2 | (Manitoba) Jason Gunnlaugson | 3
7 | (Alberta) Kevin Koe | 6
3 | (Manitoba) Mike McEwen | 2
6 | (Sweden) Niklas Edin | 3

Semifinals
1 | (Ontario) Brad Jacobs | 2
4 | (Switzerland) Peter de Cruz | 5
7 | (Alberta) Kevin Koe | 5
6 | (Sweden) Niklas Edin | 6

Final
4 | (Switzerland) Peter de Cruz | 4
6 | (Sweden) Niklas Edin | 3

==== Quarterfinals ====
| Team | 1 | 2 | 3 | 4 | 5 | 6 | 7 | 8 | Final |
| (Ontario) Brad Jacobs 🔨 | 2 | 0 | 2 | 0 | 3 | 0 | X | X | 7 |
| (Manitoba) Reid Carruthers | 0 | 1 | 0 | 1 | 0 | 1 | X | X | 3 |

Player percentages
| (Ontario) Brad Jacobs | | (Manitoba) Reid Carruthers | |
|---|---|---|---|
| Ryan Harnden | 96% | Colin Hodgson | 79% |
| E.J. Harnden | 88% | Derek Samagalski | 81% |
| Ryan Fry | 95% | Braeden Moskowy | 82% |
| Brad Jacobs | 94% | Reid Carruthers | 92% |
| Total | 93% | Total | 84% |

| Team | 1 | 2 | 3 | 4 | 5 | 6 | 7 | 8 | Final |
| (Switzerland) Peter de Cruz 🔨 | 0 | 2 | 1 | 0 | 2 | 0 | 0 | 2 | 7 |
| (Alberta) Team Bottcher | 1 | 0 | 0 | 2 | 0 | 1 | 2 | 0 | 6 |

Player percentages
| (Switzerland) Peter de Cruz | | (Alberta) Team Bottcher | |
|---|---|---|---|
| Valentin Tanner | 81% | Karrick Martin | 90% |
| Peter de Cruz | 85% | Bradley Thiessen | 85% |
| Claudio Pätz | 74% | Darren Moulding | 69% |
| Benoît Schwarz | 78% | Steve Laycock | 66% |
| Total | 80% | Total | 78% |

| Team | 1 | 2 | 3 | 4 | 5 | 6 | 7 | 8 | Final |
| (Manitoba) Jason Gunnlaugson 🔨 | 0 | 0 | 0 | 1 | 0 | 2 | 0 | 0 | 3 |
| (Alberta) Kevin Koe | 0 | 0 | 2 | 0 | 1 | 0 | 1 | 2 | 6 |

Player percentages
| (Manitoba) Jason Gunnlaugson | | (Alberta) Kevin Koe | |
|---|---|---|---|
| Connor Njegovan | 77% | Ben Hebert | 86% |
| Ian McMillan | 78% | Brent Laing | 69% |
| Alex Forrest | 49% | Marc Kennedy | 79% |
| Jason Gunnlaugson | 82% | Kevin Koe | 81% |
| Total | 71% | Total | 79% |

| Team | 1 | 2 | 3 | 4 | 5 | 6 | 7 | 8 | 9 | Final |
| (Manitoba) Mike McEwen 🔨 | 0 | 0 | 1 | 0 | 0 | 0 | 0 | 1 | 0 | 2 |
| (Sweden) Niklas Edin | 0 | 0 | 0 | 0 | 0 | 2 | 0 | 0 | 1 | 3 |

Player percentages
| (Manitoba) Mike McEwen | | (Sweden) Niklas Edin | |
|---|---|---|---|
| Denni Neufeld | 80% | Christoffer Sundgren | 93% |
| Matt Wozniak | 78% | Rasmus Wranå | 86% |
| B.J. Neufeld | 83% | Oskar Eriksson | 83% |
| Mike McEwen | 84% | Niklas Edin | 92% |
| Total | 81% | Total | 89% |

==== Semifinals ====
| Team | 1 | 2 | 3 | 4 | 5 | 6 | 7 | 8 | Final |
| (Ontario) Brad Jacobs 🔨 | 0 | 1 | 0 | 0 | 1 | 0 | 0 | X | 2 |
| (Switzerland) Peter de Cruz | 1 | 0 | 2 | 1 | 0 | 1 | 0 | X | 5 |

Player percentages
| (Ontario) Brad Jacobs | | (Switzerland) Peter de Cruz | |
|---|---|---|---|
| Ryan Harnden | 82% | Valentin Tanner | 80% |
| E.J. Harnden | 83% | Peter de Cruz | 74% |
| Ryan Fry | 96% | Claudio Pätz | 81% |
| Brad Jacobs | 71% | Benoît Schwarz | 87% |
| Total | 83% | Total | 81% |

| Team | 1 | 2 | 3 | 4 | 5 | 6 | 7 | 8 | 9 | Final |
| (Alberta) Kevin Koe | 0 | 0 | 2 | 0 | 1 | 1 | 0 | 1 | 0 | 5 |
| (Sweden) Niklas Edin 🔨 | 0 | 2 | 0 | 1 | 0 | 0 | 2 | 0 | 1 | 6 |

Player percentages
| (Alberta) Kevin Koe | | (Sweden) Niklas Edin | |
|---|---|---|---|
| Ben Hebert | 95% | Christoffer Sundgren | 100% |
| Brent Laing | 81% | Rasmus Wranå | 81% |
| Marc Kennedy | 87% | Oskar Eriksson | 76% |
| Kevin Koe | 76% | Niklas Edin | 82% |
| Total | 85% | Total | 85% |

==== Finals ====
| Team | 1 | 2 | 3 | 4 | 5 | 6 | 7 | 8 | Final |
| (Switzerland) Peter de Cruz 🔨 | 0 | 0 | 1 | 0 | 0 | 1 | 1 | 1 | 4 |
| (Sweden) Niklas Edin | 0 | 1 | 0 | 2 | 0 | 0 | 0 | 0 | 3 |

Player percentages
| (Switzerland) Peter de Cruz | | (Sweden) Niklas Edin | |
|---|---|---|---|
| Valentin Tanner | 89% | Christoffer Sundgren | 84% |
| Peter de Cruz | 76% | Rasmus Wranå | 68% |
| Claudio Pätz | 69% | Oskar Eriksson | 92% |
| Benoît Schwarz | 96% | Niklas Edin | 70% |
| Total | 82% | Total | 79% |

== Women ==
=== Teams ===
| Skip | Third | Second | Lead | Locale | OOM Rankings |
|---|---|---|---|---|---|
| Chelsea Carey | Cathy Overton-Clapham | Jocelyn Peterman | Laine Peters | Calgary, Alberta | 3 |
| Kerri Einarson | Selena Kaatz | Liz Fyfe | Kristin MacCuish | Winnipeg, Manitoba | 6 |
| Michelle Englot | Kate Cameron | Leslie Wilson-Westcott | Raunora Westcott | Winnipeg, Manitoba | 26 |
| Allison Flaxey | Clancy Grandy | Lynn Kreviazuk | Morgan Court | Caledon, Ontario | 6 |
| Kim Eun-jung | Kim Kyeong-ae | Kim-Seon-yeong | Kim Yeong-mi | Uiseong, South Korea | 22 |
| Alina Pätz | Nadine Lehmann | Marisa Winkelhausen | Nicole Schwägli | Baden, Switzerland | 10 |
| Anna Hasselborg | Sara McManus | Agnes Knochenhauer | Sofia Mabergs | Sundbyberg, Sweden | 2 |
| Rachel Homan | Emma Miskew | Joanne Courtney | Lisa Weagle | Ottawa, Ontario | 5 |
| Jennifer Jones | Kaitlyn Lawes / Shannon Birchard | Jill Officer | Dawn McEwen | Winnipeg, Manitoba | 1 |
| Darcy Robertson | Karen Klein | Vanessa Foster | Theresa Cannon | Winnipeg, Manitoba | 13 |
| Kelsey Rocque (Fourth) | Laura Crocker (Skip) | Taylor McDonald | Jennifer Gates | Edmonton, Alberta | 9 |
| Casey Scheidegger | Cary-Anne McTaggart | Jessie Scheidegger | Kristie Moore | Lethbridge, Alberta | 19 |
| Nina Roth | Tabitha Peterson | Aileen Geving | Becca Hamilton | (United States) Blaine, Minnesota | 8 |
| Val Sweeting | Lori Olson-Johns | Dana Ferguson | Rachelle Brown | Edmonton, Alberta | 14 |
| Silvana Tirinzoni | Manuela Siegrist | Esther Neuenschwander | Marlene Albrecht | Aarau, Switzerland | 7 |
| Jamie Sinclair | Alex Carlson | Vicky Persinger | Monica Walker | (United States) Blaine, Minnesota | 11 |

=== Knockout Draw Brackets ===
==== A Event ====
| First Knockout | | Semifinals | | Qualifier 1 |
| (Manitoba) Darcy Robertson | 5 |
| (Manitoba) Jennifer Jones | 3 | (Manitoba) Darcy Robertson | 4 |
| (Alberta) Casey Scheidegger | 3 | (Ontario) Allison Flaxey | 5 |
| (Ontario) Allison Flaxey | 7 | | | (Ontario) Allison Flaxey | 9 |
| (Alberta) Laura Crocker | 8 | | | (Manitoba) Michelle Englot | 4 |
| (Switzerland) Silvana Tirinzoni | 4 | (Alberta) Laura Crocker | 3 |
| (Manitoba) Michelle Englot | 9 | (Manitoba) Michelle Englot | 8 |
| (Alberta) Val Sweeting | 2 |

| First Knockout | | Semifinals | | Qualifier 2 |
| (Sweden) Anna Hasselborg | 8 |
| (South Korea) Kim Eun-jung | 2 | (Sweden) Anna Hasselborg | 4 |
| (Manitoba) Kerri Einarson | 6 | (Manitoba) Kerri Einarson | 8 |
| (Alberta) Chelsea Carey | 4 | | | (Manitoba) Kerri Einarson | 3 |
| (United States) Jamie Sinclair | 2 | | | (Ontario) Rachel Homan | 7 |
| (Ontario) Rachel Homan | 7 | (Ontario) Rachel Homan | 8 |
| (Switzerland) Alina Pätz | 0 | (United States) Nina Roth | 1 |
| (United States) Nina Roth | 8 |

==== B Event ====
| Second Knockout | | Semifinals | | Qualifier 3 |
| (Alberta) Casey Scheidegger | 4 |
| (Manitoba) Jennifer Jones | 5 | (Manitoba) Jennifer Jones | 6 |
| (Switzerland) Silvana Tirinzoni | 6 | (Switzerland) Silvana Tirinzoni | 4 |
| (Alberta) Val Sweeting | 5 | | | (Manitoba) Jennifer Jones | 9 |
| | | | | (Manitoba) Kerri Einarson | 3 |

| Second Knockout | | Semifinals | | Qualifier 4 |
| (South Korea) Kim Eun-jung | 1 |
| (Alberta) Chelsea Carey | 9 | (Alberta) Chelsea Carey | 9 |
| (United States) Jamie Sinclair | 9 | (United States) Jamie Sinclair | 2 |
| (Switzerland) Alina Pätz | 2 | | | (Alberta) Chelsea Carey | 8 |
| | | | | (Manitoba) Michelle Englot | 1 |

| Second Knockout | | Qualifier 5 |
| (Manitoba) Darcy Robertson | 5 |
| (Alberta) Laura Crocker | 7 | (Alberta) Laura Crocker | 6 |
| (Sweden) Anna Hasselborg | 7 | (Sweden) Anna Hasselborg | 4 |
| (United States) Nina Roth | 4 |

==== C Event ====
| Third Knockout | | Semifinals | | Qualifier 6 |
| (Alberta) Casey Scheidegger | 6 |
| (Alberta) Val Sweeting | 3 | (Alberta) Casey Scheidegger | 4 |
| | | (United States) Nina Roth | 7 |
| | | | | (United States) Nina Roth | 4 |
| | | | | (Manitoba) Michelle Englot | 6 |

| Third Knockout | | Semifinals | | Qualifier 7 |
| (South Korea) Kim Eun-jung | 7 |
| (Switzerland) Alina Pätz | 4 | (South Korea) Kim Eun-jung | 8 |
| | | (Manitoba) Darcy Robertson | 4 |
| | | | | (South Korea) Kim Eun-jung | 6 |
| | | | | (Manitoba) Kerri Einarson | 3 |

| Third Knockout | | Qualifier 8 |
| (Switzerland) Silvana Tirinzoni | 7 |
| (United States) Jamie Sinclair | 3 | (Switzerland) Silvana Tirinzoni | 5 |
| | | (Sweden) Anna Hasselborg | 4 |

=== Playoffs ===
Quarterfinals
1 | (Ontario) Rachel Homan | 4
8 | (South Korea) Kim Eun-jung | 7
4 | (Alberta) Chelsea Carey | 8
5 | (Alberta) Laura Crocker | 5
2 | (Ontario) Allison Flaxey | 4
7 | (Manitoba) Michelle Englot | 5
3 | (Manitoba) Jennifer Jones | 6
6 | (Switzerland) Silvana Tirinzoni | 3

Semifinals
8 | (South Korea) Kim Eun-jung | 4
4 | (Alberta) Chelsea Carey | 6
7 | (Manitoba) Michelle Englot | 10
3 | (Manitoba) Jennifer Jones | 4

Final
4 | (Alberta) Chelsea Carey | 10
7 | (Manitoba) Michelle Englot | 5

==== Quarterfinals ====
| Team | 1 | 2 | 3 | 4 | 5 | 6 | 7 | 8 | Final |
| (Ontario) Rachel Homan 🔨 | 0 | 0 | 2 | 0 | 1 | 0 | 1 | X | 4 |
| (South Korea) Kim Eun-jung | 0 | 2 | 0 | 2 | 0 | 3 | 0 | X | 7 |

Player percentages
| (Ontario) Rachel Homan | | (South Korea) Kim Eun-jung | |
|---|---|---|---|
| Lisa Weagle | 95% | Kim Yeong-mi | 84% |
| Joanne Courtney | 91% | Kim Seon-yeong | 83% |
| Emma Miskew | 70% | Kim Kyeong-ae | 90% |
| Rachel Homan | 57% | Kim Eun-jung | 81% |
| Total | 79% | Total | 85% |

| Team | 1 | 2 | 3 | 4 | 5 | 6 | 7 | 8 | Final |
| (Alberta) Chelsea Carey | 0 | 1 | 0 | 3 | 1 | 0 | 3 | X | 8 |
| (Alberta) Laura Crocker 🔨 | 2 | 0 | 1 | 0 | 0 | 2 | 0 | X | 5 |

Player percentages
| (Alberta) Chelsea Carey | | (Alberta) Laura Crocker | |
|---|---|---|---|
| Laine Peters | 84% | Jen Gates | 80% |
| Jocelyn Peterman | 56% | Taylor McDonald | 85% |
| Cathy Overton-Clapham | 71% | Laura Crocker | 55% |
| Chelsea Carey | 83% | Kelsey Rocque | 70% |
| Total | 74% | Total | 73% |

| Team | 1 | 2 | 3 | 4 | 5 | 6 | 7 | 8 | 9 | Final |
| (Ontario) Allison Flaxey 🔨 | 0 | 1 | 1 | 0 | 0 | 2 | 0 | 1 | 0 | 5 |
| (Manitoba) Michelle Englot | 0 | 0 | 0 | 1 | 1 | 0 | 3 | 0 | 1 | 6 |

Player percentages
| (Ontario) Allison Flaxey | | (Manitoba) Michelle Englot | |
|---|---|---|---|
| Morgan Court | 70% | Raunora Westcott | 70% |
| Lynn Kreviazuk | 75% | Leslie Wilson-Westcott | 67% |
| Clancy Grandy | 62% | Kate Cameron | 58% |
| Allison Flaxey | 57% | Michelle Englot | 75% |
| Total | 66% | Total | 67% |

| Team | 1 | 2 | 3 | 4 | 5 | 6 | 7 | 8 | Final |
| (Manitoba) Jennifer Jones 🔨 | 0 | 2 | 0 | 3 | 0 | 0 | 1 | X | 6 |
| (Switzerland) Silvana Tirinzoni | 0 | 0 | 2 | 0 | 0 | 1 | 0 | X | 3 |

Player percentages
| (Manitoba) Jennifer Jones | | (Switzerland) Silvana Tirinzoni | |
|---|---|---|---|
| Dawn McEwen | 93% | Marlene Albrecht | 85% |
| Jill Officer | 87% | Manuela Siegrist | 74% |
| Kaitlyn Lawes | 91% | Esther Neuenschwander | 79% |
| Jennifer Jones | 82% | Silvana Tirinzoni | 74% |
| Total | 88% | Total | 78% |

==== Semifinals ====
| Team | 1 | 2 | 3 | 4 | 5 | 6 | 7 | 8 | Final |
| (South Korea) Kim Eun-jung | 0 | 3 | 0 | 0 | 1 | 0 | 0 | X | 4 |
| (Alberta) Chelsea Carey 🔨 | 1 | 0 | 1 | 1 | 0 | 1 | 2 | X | 6 |

Player percentages
| (South Korea) Kim Eun-jung | | (Alberta) Chelsea Carey | |
|---|---|---|---|
| Kim Yeong-mi | 82% | Laine Peters | 94% |
| Kim Seon-yeong | 87% | Jocelyn Peterman | 73% |
| Kim Kyeong-ae | 70% | Cathy Overton-Clapham | 84% |
| Kim Eun-jung | 75% | Chelsea Carey | 71% |
| Total | 78% | Total | 80% |

| Team | 1 | 2 | 3 | 4 | 5 | 6 | 7 | 8 | Final |
| (Manitoba) Michelle Englot | 0 | 1 | 0 | 3 | 1 | 0 | 5 | X | 10 |
| (Manitoba) Jennifer Jones 🔨 | 2 | 0 | 1 | 0 | 0 | 1 | 0 | X | 4 |

Player percentages
| (Manitoba) Michelle Englot | | (Manitoba) Jennifer Jones | |
|---|---|---|---|
| Raunora Westcott | 91% | Dawn McEwen | 94% |
| Leslie Wilson-Westcott | 77% | Jill Officer | 86% |
| Kate Cameron | 72% | Kaitlyn Lawes | 86% |
| Michelle Englot | 93% | Jennifer Jones | 55% |
| Total | 83% | Total | 80% |

==== Finals ====
| Team | 1 | 2 | 3 | 4 | 5 | 6 | 7 | 8 | Final |
| (Alberta) Chelsea Carey 🔨 | 2 | 0 | 3 | 0 | 1 | 0 | 0 | 4 | 10 |
| (Manitoba) Michelle Englot | 0 | 2 | 0 | 2 | 0 | 1 | 0 | 0 | 5 |

Player percentages
| (Alberta) Chelsea Carey | | (Manitoba) Michelle Englot | |
|---|---|---|---|
| Laine Peters | 60% | Raunora Westcott | 87% |
| Jocelyn Peterman | 76% | Leslie Wilson-Westcott | 70% |
| Cathy Overton-Clapham | 86% | Kate Cameron | 81% |
| Chelsea Carey | 77% | Michelle Englot | 78% |
| Total | 75% | Total | 79% |
