= 2017 United States Olympic curling trials =

2017 United States Olympic Curling Trials
- Host city: Omaha, Nebraska
- Arena: Baxter Arena
- Dates: November 11–18, 2017
- Men's winner: (Minnesota) John Shuster
- Curling club: Duluth CC, Duluth, Minnesota
- Skip: John Shuster
- Third: Tyler George
- Second: Matt Hamilton
- Lead: John Landsteiner
- Finalist: (Minnesota) Heath McCormick
- Women's winner: (Minnesota) Nina Roth
- Curling club: Four Seasons CC, Blaine, Minnesota
- Skip: Nina Roth
- Third: Tabitha Peterson
- Second: Aileen Geving
- Lead: Becca Hamilton
- Finalist: (Minnesota) Jamie Sinclair

The 2017 United States Olympic Curling Trials were held from November 11–18, 2017 at Baxter Arena in Omaha, Nebraska. Five teams qualified for the men's tournament and three teams qualified for the women's tournament. The winner of each tournament represented the United States at the 2018 Winter Olympics in Pyeongchang County, South Korea.

== Road to the Trials ==
USA Curling used a number of selection criteria to determine which teams would qualify for the Olympic Trials. If an American team placed in the top five at the 2017 World Men's Curling Championship or 2017 World Women's Curling Championship, that team would automatically qualify for the Olympic Trials. The John Shuster and Nina Roth rinks qualified via this method. Next, teams had an opportunity to qualify for the Olympic Trials by placing in the top 15 of the World Curling Tour Order of Merit standings for the 2016–17 season. No US teams placed high enough in these standings to automatically qualify in this manner. The final criterion used for inclusion in the trial was a discretionary selection by USA Curling's Olympic Team Selection Committee. The committee was required to choose some number of teams for each tournament to ensure that there were a minimum of three and a maximum of five teams competing. The committee chose three men's teams and two women's teams. A fifth team, skipped by Todd Birr, was added to the men's tournament after a successful appeal to the USCA Judiciary Hearing Panel, alleging that the Olympic Team Selection Committee erred in its decision not to include Team Birr in the tournament.

== Men ==
=== Teams ===
Five teams qualified for the men's tournament:

Skip	Third	Second	Lead	Alternate	Locale	Qualification method
John Shuster	Tyler George	Matt Hamilton	John Landsteiner	Joe Polo	Duluth, Minnesota	Top 5 finish at 2017 World Men's Curling Championship
Heath McCormick	Chris Plys	Korey Dropkin	Tom Howell	Rich Ruohonen	Blaine, Minnesota	Discretionary selection
Brady Clark	Greg Persinger	Colin Hufman	Philip Tilker		(Washington (state)) Seattle, Washington	Discretionary selection
Craig Brown	Jason Smith	Kroy Nernberger	Sean Beighton	Quinn Evenson	Madison, Wisconsin	Discretionary selection
Todd Birr	John Benton	Hunter Clawson	Tom O'Connor		Blaine, Minnesota	Appeal to USCA Judiciary Hearing Panel

=== Round-robin standings ===
Final round-robin standings

Key
Teams to Final
Teams to Tiebreaker

Skip	W	L	PF	PA	Ends Won	Ends Lost	Blank Ends	Stolen Ends	Shot Pct.
(Minnesota) John Shuster	6	2	49	42	33	31	11	10	81%
(Minnesota) Heath McCormick	5	3	53	39	31	28	13	9	82%
(Minnesota) Todd Birr	5	3	47	49	33	29	13	8	82%
(Wisconsin) Craig Brown	3	5	42	47	31	31	13	9	82%
(Washington (state)) Brady Clark	1	7	45	59	28	37	8	7	79%

=== Round-robin results ===
All draw times are listed in Central Standard Time (UTC−6).

==== Draw 1 ====
Saturday, November 11, 1:00 pm

Team	1	2	3	4	5	6	7	8	9	10	Final
(Minnesota) John Shuster	1	0	0	0	1	0	2	1	0	2	7
(Washington (state)) Brady Clark	0	1	0	2	0	2	0	0	1	0	6

Team	1	2	3	4	5	6	7	8	9	10	Final
(Wisconsin) Craig Brown	1	0	1	0	0	1	0	X	X	X	3
(Minnesota) Heath McCormick	0	4	0	1	1	0	2	X	X	X	8

==== Draw 2 ====
Saturday, November 11, 7:00 pm

Team	1	2	3	4	5	6	7	8	9	10	Final
(Minnesota) Todd Birr	0	0	1	0	0	2	0	1	0	X	4
(Wisconsin) Craig Brown	1	3	0	2	0	0	1	0	1	X	8

Team	1	2	3	4	5	6	7	8	9	10	Final
(Washington (state)) Brady Clark	0	0	1	0	0	2	1	0	1	0	5
(Minnesota) Heath McCormick	2	1	0	0	2	0	0	2	0	1	8

==== Draw 3 ====
Sunday, November 12, 1:00 pm

Team	1	2	3	4	5	6	7	8	9	10	Final
(Minnesota) Heath McCormick	1	1	0	2	0	1	0	0	0	X	5
(Minnesota) John Shuster	0	0	2	0	2	0	0	2	1	X	7

Team	1	2	3	4	5	6	7	8	9	10	Final
(Minnesota) Todd Birr	0	2	0	1	0	1	1	2	0	2	9
(Washington (state)) Brady Clark	0	0	2	0	2	0	0	0	2	0	6

==== Draw 4 ====
Sunday, November 12, 7:00 pm

Team	1	2	3	4	5	6	7	8	9	10	11	Final
(Minnesota) John Shuster	0	1	0	1	0	1	0	0	2	0	1	6
(Wisconsin) Craig Brown	1	0	0	0	1	0	0	1	0	2	0	5

Team	1	2	3	4	5	6	7	8	9	10	Final
(Minnesota) Heath McCormick	0	0	0	0	0	1	1	0	4	X	6
(Minnesota) Todd Birr	0	0	0	1	0	0	0	1	0	X	2

==== Draw 5 ====
Monday, November 13, 11:00 am

Team	1	2	3	4	5	6	7	8	9	10	Final
(Minnesota) John Shuster	0	0	2	1	0	0	1	1	0	0	5
(Minnesota) Todd Birr	1	0	0	0	3	1	0	0	1	1	8

Team	1	2	3	4	5	6	7	8	9	10	Final
(Wisconsin) Craig Brown	0	0	0	1	0	0	0	2	1	1	5
(Washington (state)) Brady Clark	0	2	0	0	0	3	1	0	0	0	6

==== Draw 6 ====
Monday, November 13, 7:00 pm

Team	1	2	3	4	5	6	7	8	9	10	Final
(Wisconsin) Craig Brown	0	2	2	0	0	1	0	0	1	0	6
(Minnesota) Heath McCormick	0	0	0	2	2	0	1	2	0	1	8

Team	1	2	3	4	5	6	7	8	9	10	Final
(Washington (state)) Brady Clark	2	1	0	0	0	1	0	0	2	X	6
(Minnesota) John Shuster	0	0	2	2	1	0	0	2	0	X	7

==== Draw 7 ====
Tuesday, November 14, 11:00 am

Team	1	2	3	4	5	6	7	8	9	10	Final
(Minnesota) Todd Birr	0	0	2	1	0	1	0	3	0	2	9
(Washington (state)) Brady Clark	1	1	0	0	3	0	1	0	2	0	8

Team	1	2	3	4	5	6	7	8	9	10	Final
(Minnesota) John Shuster	0	2	0	0	0	2	0	2	0	0	6
(Minnesota) Heath McCormick	1	0	0	1	0	0	0	0	2	1	5

==== Draw 8 ====
Tuesday, November 14, 7:00 pm

Team	1	2	3	4	5	6	7	8	9	10	Final
(Minnesota) Heath McCormick	1	0	1	0	0	5	X	X	X	X	7
(Washington (state)) Brady Clark	0	1	0	1	0	0	X	X	X	X	2

Team	1	2	3	4	5	6	7	8	9	10	Final
(Minnesota) Todd Birr	1	0	1	0	0	0	0	2	0	1	5
(Wisconsin) Craig Brown	0	2	0	1	0	0	0	0	0	0	3

==== Draw 9 ====
Wednesday, November 15, 11:00 am

Team	1	2	3	4	5	6	7	8	9	10	Final
(Washington (state)) Brady Clark	2	0	0	3	0	0	1	0	X	X	6
(Wisconsin) Craig Brown	0	1	2	0	1	2	0	1	X	X	7

Team	1	2	3	4	5	6	7	8	9	10	Final
(Minnesota) John Shuster	2	0	2	0	2	1	X	X	X	X	7
(Minnesota) Todd Birr	0	1	0	1	0	0	X	X	X	X	2

==== Draw 10 ====
Wednesday, November 15, 7:00 pm

Team	1	2	3	4	5	6	7	8	9	10	11	Final
(Minnesota) Heath McCormick	3	0	0	0	0	0	0	2	0	1	0	6
(Minnesota) Todd Birr	0	1	0	2	1	0	1	0	1	0	2	8

Team	1	2	3	4	5	6	7	8	9	10	Final
(Wisconsin) Craig Brown	0	1	0	0	0	1	0	1	0	2	5
(Minnesota) John Shuster	1	0	0	1	1	0	0	0	1	0	4

=== Tiebreaker ===
Thursday, November 16, 8:30 am

Team	1	2	3	4	5	6	7	8	9	10	Final
(Minnesota) Heath McCormick	2	0	2	0	1	1	1	1	0	0	8
(Minnesota) Todd Birr	0	2	0	2	0	0	0	0	1	1	6

=== Final ===
The final round was between the top two teams at the end of the round robin. The teams played a best-of-three series.

Finals
1	(Minnesota) John Shuster	3	9	7
2	(Minnesota) Heath McCormick	5	4	5

==== Game 1 ====
Thursday, November 16, 6:00pm

Team	1	2	3	4	5	6	7	8	9	10	Final
(Minnesota) John Shuster	0	0	1	0	0	1	0	1	0	X	3
(Minnesota) Heath McCormick	0	1	0	1	1	0	1	0	1	X	5

Player percentages
(Minnesota) John Shuster		(Minnesota) Heath McCormick	
John Landsteiner	87%	Tom Howell	84%
Matt Hamilton	80%	Korey Dropkin	94%
Tyler George	78%	Chris Plys	79%
John Shuster	71%	Heath McCormick	91%
Total	79%	Total	87%

==== Game 2 ====
Friday, November 17, 6:30pm

Team	1	2	3	4	5	6	7	8	9	10	Final
(Minnesota) John Shuster	0	3	0	1	0	0	1	0	4	X	9
(Minnesota) Heath McCormick	1	0	1	0	0	1	0	1	0	X	4

Player percentages
(Minnesota) John Shuster		(Minnesota) Heath McCormick	
John Landsteiner	99%	Tom Howell	92%
Matt Hamilton	93%	Korey Dropkin	79%
Tyler George	96%	Chris Plys	77%
John Shuster	94%	Heath McCormick	82%
Total	96%	Total	82%

==== Game 3 ====
Saturday, November 18, 6:30pm

Team	1	2	3	4	5	6	7	8	9	10	Final
(Minnesota) John Shuster	3	0	1	0	1	0	0	1	0	1	7
(Minnesota) Heath McCormick	0	2	0	1	0	0	1	0	1	0	5

Player percentages
(Minnesota) John Shuster		(Minnesota) Heath McCormick	
John Landsteiner	97%	Tom Howell	96%
Matt Hamilton	89%	Korey Dropkin	82%
Tyler George	82%	Chris Plys	85%
John Shuster	90%	Heath McCormick	89%
Total	90%	Total	88%

== Women ==
=== Teams ===
Three teams qualified for the women's tournament:

Skip	Third	Second	Lead	Locale	Qualification method
Nina Roth	Tabitha Peterson	Aileen Geving	Becca Hamilton	Madison, Wisconsin	Top 5 finish at 2017 World Women's Curling Championship
Jamie Sinclair	Alex Carlson	Vicky Persinger	Monica Walker	Blaine, Minnesota	Discretionary selection
Cory Christensen	Sarah Anderson	Taylor Anderson	Jenna Martin	Blaine, Minnesota	Discretionary selection

=== Round-robin standings ===
Final round-robin standings

Key
Teams to Final

Skip	W	L	PF	PA	Ends Won	Ends Lost	Blank Ends	Stolen Ends	Shot Pct.
(Minnesota) Jamie Sinclair	4	2	42	32	24	23	9	4	82%
(Wisconsin) Nina Roth	4	2	43	38	27	23	9	5	81%
(Minnesota) Cory Christensen	1	5	26	43	20	25	10	1	77%

=== Round-robin results ===
All draw times are listed in Central Standard Time (UTC−6).

==== Draw 1 ====
Saturday, November 11, 7:00 pm

Team	1	2	3	4	5	6	7	8	9	10	Final
(Wisconsin) Nina Roth	0	2	0	2	0	0	0	1	1	2	8
(Minnesota) Jamie Sinclair	3	0	1	0	3	1	1	0	0	0	9

==== Draw 2 ====
Sunday, November 12, 1:00 pm

Team	1	2	3	4	5	6	7	8	9	10	11	Final
(Wisconsin) Nina Roth	0	0	2	0	1	0	1	0	2	0	1	7
(Minnesota) Cory Christensen	1	0	0	1	0	0	0	2	0	2	0	6

==== Draw 3 ====
Sunday, November 12, 7:00 pm

Team	1	2	3	4	5	6	7	8	9	10	Final
(Minnesota) Jamie Sinclair	0	0	0	2	0	2	1	0	1	0	6
(Minnesota) Cory Christensen	0	2	1	0	1	0	0	2	0	1	7

==== Draw 4 ====
Monday, November 13, 11:00 am

Team	1	2	3	4	5	6	7	8	9	10	Final
(Minnesota) Cory Christensen	0	0	1	0	0	1	0	0	X	X	2
(Wisconsin) Nina Roth	0	2	0	0	2	0	2	3	X	X	9

==== Draw 5 ====
Monday, November 13, 7:00 pm

Team	1	2	3	4	5	6	7	8	9	10	11	Final
(Minnesota) Jamie Sinclair	0	3	0	1	0	1	0	0	0	2	0	7
(Wisconsin) Nina Roth	2	0	2	0	1	0	0	0	2	0	1	8

==== Draw 6 ====
Tuesday, November 14, 11:00 am

Team	1	2	3	4	5	6	7	8	9	10	Final
(Minnesota) Jamie Sinclair	2	1	0	2	0	4	0	X	X	X	9
(Minnesota) Cory Christensen	0	0	1	0	1	0	1	X	X	X	3

==== Draw 7 ====
Tuesday, November 14, 7:00 pm

Team	1	2	3	4	5	6	7	8	9	10	Final
(Wisconsin) Nina Roth	0	0	0	1	0	1	0	2	0	X	4
(Minnesota) Jamie Sinclair	2	0	0	0	2	0	1	0	2	X	7

==== Draw 8 ====
Wednesday, November 15, 11:00 am

Team	1	2	3	4	5	6	7	8	9	10	Final
(Minnesota) Cory Christensen	1	0	0	1	0	1	0	0	3	0	6
(Wisconsin) Nina Roth	0	2	0	0	2	0	2	1	0	1	8

==== Draw 9 ====
Wednesday, November 15, 7:00 pm

Team	1	2	3	4	5	6	7	8	9	10	Final
(Minnesota) Cory Christensen	0	0	1	0	0	0	1	0	0	X	2
(Minnesota) Jamie Sinclair	0	1	0	2	0	0	0	0	1	X	4

=== Final ===
The final round was between the top two teams at the end of the round robin. The teams played a best-of-three series.

Finals
1	(Minnesota) Jamie Sinclair	5	7	6
2	(Wisconsin) Nina Roth	6	6	7

==== Game 1 ====
Thursday, November 16, 1:30 pm

Team	1	2	3	4	5	6	7	8	9	10	11	Final
(Minnesota) Jamie Sinclair	1	0	0	0	2	0	0	1	0	1	0	5
(Wisconsin) Nina Roth	0	0	0	2	0	0	1	0	2	0	1	6

Player percentages
(Minnesota) Jamie Sinclair		(Wisconsin) Nina Roth	
Monica Walker	91%	Becca Hamilton	88%
Vicky Persinger	76%	Aileen Geving	86%
Alex Carlson	76%	Tabitha Peterson	75%
Jamie Sinclair	72%	Nina Roth	83%
Total	79%	Total	83%

==== Game 2 ====
Friday, November 17, 1:00pm

Team	1	2	3	4	5	6	7	8	9	10	11	Final
(Minnesota) Jamie Sinclair	0	0	2	0	1	0	0	2	1	0	1	7
(Wisconsin) Nina Roth	0	1	0	1	0	1	1	0	0	2	0	6

Player percentages
(Minnesota) Jamie Sinclair		(Wisconsin) Nina Roth	
Monica Walker	81%	Becca Hamilton	93%
Vicky Persinger	82%	Aileen Geving	77%
Alex Carlson	88%	Tabitha Peterson	79%
Jamie Sinclair	79%	Nina Roth	71%
Total	82%	Total	80%

==== Game 3 ====
Saturday, November 18, 10:00am

Team	1	2	3	4	5	6	7	8	9	10	Final
(Minnesota) Jamie Sinclair	0	2	1	0	0	0	0	1	2	0	6
(Wisconsin) Nina Roth	2	0	0	2	0	1	0	0	0	2	7

Player percentages
(Minnesota) Jamie Sinclair		(Wisconsin) Nina Roth	
Monica Walker	92%	Becca Hamilton	80%
Vicky Persinger	73%	Aileen Geving	90%
Alex Carlson	77%	Tabitha Peterson	84%
Jamie Sinclair	69%	Nina Roth	75%
Total	78%	Total	82%
