= 2014 United States Mixed Doubles Curling Championship =

- Host city: Medford, Wisconsin
- Arena: Medford Curling Club
- Dates: December 4-8, 2013
- Winner: Joyance Meechai and Steve Gebauer

The 2014 United States Mixed Doubles Curling Championship was held from December 4-8, 2013 at the Medford Curling Club in Medford, Wisconsin. Joyance Meechai, from New York, and Steve Gebauer, from Minnesota, won the tournament, earning the right to represent the United States at the 2014 World Mixed Doubles Curling Championship in Dumfries, Scotland.

== Teams ==
Sixteen teams qualified to compete in the championship.

Female	Male	State(s)
Danielle Buchbinder	Michael Rupp	New York
Michelle Wagner	Dan Buresh	North Dakota
Cristin Clark	Brady Clark	Washington
Carol Strojny	Timothy Doherty	Minnesota
Emilia Juocys	Sean Murray	Michigan, Wisconsin
Sharon Vukich	David Cornfield	Washington
Kristy Witzke	Jeremy Witzke	Oklahoma
Stephanie Martin	Dan Wiza	Illinois, Wisconsin
Maymar Gemmell	Alan Gemmell	New Jersey
Britt Rjanikov	Barry Ivy	Massachusetts, California
Dena Rosenberry	Darrick Kizlyk	Colorado
Joyance Meechai	Steven Gebauer	New York, Minnesota
Teri Olson	Scott Olson	Massachusetts
Kim Roden	Gary Mazzotta	Minnesota
Sydney Schmus	Daniel Schally	Wisconsin
Maureen Stolt	Peter Stolt	Minnesota

== Round robin ==
The 16 teams were split into two pools of 8 teams. Each pool played a round robin and at the end the top two teams advanced to the playoffs. The standings at the end of the round robin phase were:

Key
Teams to playoffs

Pool A	W	L
Juocys / Murray	7	0
Vukich / Cornfield	6	1
Clark / Clark	5	2
Wagner / Buresh	3	4
Strojny / Doherty	3	4
Martin / Wiza	3	4
Buchbinder / Rupp	1	6
Witzke / Witzke	0	7

Pool B	W	L
Stolt / Stolt	6	1
Meechai / Gebauer	5	2
Gemmell / Gemmell	4	3
Olson / Olson	4	3
Rjanikov / Ivy	3	4
Rosenberry / Kizlyk	3	4
Schmus / Schally	2	5
Roden / Mazzotta	1	6

== Playoffs ==
=== Bracket ===
Semifinals
Juocys/Murray	5
Meechai/Gebauer	8
Stolt/Stolt	7
Vukich/Cornfield	3

Final
Meechai/Gebauer	7
Stolt/Stolt	6

=== Semifinals ===
Sunday, December 8, 9:00am CT

Team	1	2	3	4	5	6	7	8	Final
Juocys/Murray	1	0	0	0	2	2	0	0	5
Meechai/Gebauer	0	4	1	1	0	0	1	1	8

Team	1	2	3	4	5	6	7	8	Final
Stolt/Stolt	2	1	1	0	1	0	2	X	7
Vukich/Cornfield	0	0	0	1	0	2	0	X	3

=== Final ===
Sunday, December 8, 12:00pm CT

Team	1	2	3	4	5	6	7	8	9	Final
Meechai/Gebauer	1	0	0	3	1	0	1	0	1	7
Stolt/Stolt	0	1	2	0	0	2	0	1	0	6
