= Sarah Anderson (curler) =

American curler (born 1995)

- Curler
- Born: February 25, 1995 (age 31); Philadelphia, Pennsylvania, U.S.

Team
- Curling club: Philadelphia CC, Philadelphia, PA
- Mixed doubles partner: Andrew Stopera

Curling career
- Member Association: United States
- World Championship: 3 (2013, 2019, 2022)
- World Mixed Doubles Championship: 2 (2015, 2018)
Medal record
Women's curling
Representing United States
World Junior Championships
Silver medal – second place	2016 Copenhagen
Representing Minnesota
U.S. Olympic Trials
Silver medal – second place	2025 Lafayette	Mixed doubles
Bronze medal – third place	2017 Omaha	Women's
U.S. Women's Championship
Gold medal – first place	2019 Kalamazoo
Gold medal – first place	2021 Wausau
Silver medal – second place	2018 Fargo
Silver medal – second place	2020 Cheney
Silver medal – second place	2024 East Rutherford
Bronze medal – third place	2016 Jacksonville
Bronze medal – third place	2023 Denver
U.S. Mixed Doubles Championship
Gold medal – first place	2015 Eau Claire
Gold medal – first place	2018 Eau Claire
Silver medal – second place	2023 Kalamazoo
Bronze medal – third place	2020 Bemidji
Bronze medal – third place	2026 Bemidji

Sarah Fenson (née Anderson; born February 25, 1995) is an American curler from Broomall, Pennsylvania. Along with her twin sister Taylor, she was United States National Champion in 2019 and 2021, and World Junior silver medalist in 2016.

== Career ==
=== Juniors ===
Anderson was a member of Team USA at the 2012 Winter Youth Olympics, playing third on the team, which was skipped by Korey Dropkin. They finished in fifth place. In the mixed doubles event, Anderson was paired with South Korea's Go Ke-on. They lost their only match.

Anderson won the 2015 and 2016 United States Junior Curling Championships playing third for Cory Christensen. The team represented the United States at the World Junior Curling Championships both years. At the 2015 World Junior Curling Championships, the team lost in a tiebreaker, settling for fifth place. They had much more success at the 2016 World Junior Curling Championships, making it all the way to the gold medal final, where they lost to Canada.

=== Women's ===
Anderson made her debut at the United States Women's Curling Championship in 2013 skipping a team of Courtney Slata, Kathleen Dubberstein and Taylor Anderson (Sarah's twin sister). The team finished the event with a 2–7 record. Anderson was named as the alternate player for Team USA at that year's World Championships. She would not play in any games, and the team finished fourth.

Anderson played in the 2014 United States Women's Curling Championship skipping a team of Slata (now Anderson-Slata), Taylor Anderson and Emily Anderson. The team finished with a 4–5 record.

In 2014, the Anderson twins joined the Christensen rink to play in both juniors and women's events. The team won a World Curling Tour (WCT) event in their first season, the 2014 Molson Cash Spiel. The team played in the 2015 United States Women's Curling Championship, finishing fourth. The next season the team won another WCT event, the 2015 St. Paul Cash Spiel. Later that season, they finished third at the 2016 United States Women's Curling Championship. The team won the St. Paul Cash Spiel again in 2016 and finished fifth at the 2017 United States Women's Curling Championship. In their last season together, the team finished 2nd at the 2018 United States Women's Curling Championship and was also one of three invited to the 2017 United States Olympic Curling Trials, where they finished last with just one win.

After the 2017–18 season, Sarah and Taylor Anderson joined the Jamie Sinclair rink. In their first season together, the team won the 2019 United States Women's Curling Championship and represented the U.S. at the 2019 World Women's Curling Championship, finishing with a 6–6 record. When Jamie Sinclair left to play curling in Canada in 2020, the team continued to play together, with Cory Christensen skipping the new rink. The Christensen rink started off strong, finishing second at the 2021 United States Olympic curling trials, losing to Tabitha Peterson in the final. The rink followed up that success by winning the 2021 United States Women's Curling Championship, and represented the United States at the 2022 World Women's Curling Championship, finishing 5th after losing in the quarterfinals to Sweden's Anna Hasselborg. When Christensen announced she would be leaving to join Peterson's rink, Sarah and Taylor Anderson formed their own rink alongside Lexi Lanigan and Leah Yavarow, with Sarah Anderson skipping the rink. The rink had a strong performance, finishing 3rd at the 2023 United States Women's Championship and second at the 2024 Championship.

In 2024, Anderson announced that she would be joining the Delaney Strouse rink, alongside Sydney Mullaney and Anne O'Hara. In their first year together, they finished 6th at the 2025 United States Women's Curling Championship. The following year, in 2025, Anderson announced that she would be stepping back from women's curling.

=== Mixed doubles ===
Anderson has represented the United States twice in her career at the World Mixed Doubles Curling Championship. At the 2015 World Mixed Doubles Curling Championship with teammate Korey Dropkin, she finished second in her group (7–2 record), but lost in the quarterfinals. The pair also played in the 2018 World Mixed Doubles Curling Championship, where they went 6–1 in group play, but lost in the round of 16.

Anderson started playing mixed doubles with Andrew Stopera in the 2022–23 curling season, where the pair found success, finishing 2nd at the 2023 United States Mixed Doubles Curling Championship, losing to former teammate Korey Dropkin and Cory Thiesse in the final. Anderson and Stopera then won the 2024 United States Mixed Doubles Olympic Pre-Trials, qualifying them for the 2025 United States Mixed Doubles Curling Olympic Trials. At the US Olympic Trials, Anderson and Stopera went 7–2 in the round robin, and lost to Thiesse and Dropkin in a best of three games final to finish 2nd.

== Personal life ==
Anderson attended Marple Newtown High School and the University of Minnesota. She currently lives in Minneapolis. She married Graeme Fenson, son of Pete Fenson in 2025. Her parents are Canadian.

== Teams ==
=== Women's ===
Season	Skip	Third	Second	Lead	Alternate	Coach	Events
2007–08	Sarah Anderson	Kristin Pohlman	Julia Pohlman	Taylor Anderson	Meagan Hudson	Wayne Anderson	2008 USJCC (9th)
2012–13	Sarah Anderson	Kathleen Dubberstein	Taylor Anderson	Leilani Dubberstein	Abigail Suslavich	Tyler George	2013 USJCC (4th)
2012–13	Sarah Anderson	Courtney Slata	Kathleen Dubberstein	Taylor Anderson			2013 USWCC (9th)
2012–13	Erika Brown	Debbie McCormick	Jessica Schultz	Ann Swisshelm	Sarah Anderson	Bill Todhunter	2013 WWCC (4th)
2013–14	Sarah Anderson	Kathleen Dubberstein	Taylor Anderson	Leilani Dubberstein		Wayne Anderson	2014 USJCC (silver)
2013–14	Sarah Anderson	Taylor Anderson	Courtney Anderson-Slata	Emily Anderson			2014 USWCC (6th)
2014–15	Cory Christensen	Sarah Anderson	Mackenzie Lank	Jenna Haag	Taylor Anderson	John Benton	2015 USJCC (gold); 2015 USWCC (4th); 2015 WJCC (5th)
2015–16	Cory Christensen	Sarah Anderson	Taylor Anderson	Madison Bear	Christine McMakin	Dave Jensen	2016 USJCC (gold); 2016 USWCC (bronze); 2016 WJCC (silver)
2016–17	Cory Christensen	Sarah Anderson	Taylor Anderson	Jenna Haag		Ann Swisshelm	2017 USWCC (5th)
2017–18	Cory Christensen	Sarah Anderson	Taylor Anderson	Jenna Martin		Phill Drobnick	2017 USOCT (3rd); 2018 USWCC (silver)
2018–19	Jamie Sinclair	Sarah Anderson	Taylor Anderson	Monica Walker	Vicky Persinger (WWCC)	Bryan Cochrane	2019 USWCC (gold); 2019 WWCC (7th)
2019–20	Jamie Sinclair	Cory Christensen	Vicky Persinger	Taylor Anderson	Sarah Anderson	Cathy Overton-Clapham	2020 USWCC (silver)
2020–21	Cory Christensen	Sarah Anderson	Vicky Persinger	Taylor Anderson		Cathy Overton-Clapham	2021 USWCC (gold)
2021–22	Cory Christensen	Sarah Anderson	Vicky Persinger	Taylor Anderson			2021 USOCT (silver); 2022 WWCC (5th)
2022–23	Sarah Anderson	Taylor Anderson	Lexi Lanigan	Leah Yavarow			2023 USWCC (bronze)
2023–24	Sarah Anderson	Taylor Anderson	Lexi Lanigan	Leah Yavarow			2024 USWCC (silver)
2024–25	Delaney Strouse	Sarah Anderson	Sydney Mullaney	Anne O'Hara			2025 USWCC (6th)

=== Mixed doubles ===
Season	Female	Male	Events
2014–15	Sarah Anderson	Korey Dropkin	2015 USMDCC (gold); 2015 WMDCC (5th)
2017–18	Sarah Anderson	Korey Dropkin	2018 USMDCC (gold); 2018 WMDCC (13th)
2018–19	Sarah Anderson	Korey Dropkin	2019 USMDCC (QF)
2019–20	Sarah Anderson	Korey Dropkin	2020 USMDCC (bronze)
2020–21	Sarah Anderson	Korey Dropkin	
2021–22	Sarah Anderson	Korey Dropkin	2021 USMDOT (bronze); 2022 USMDCC (5th)
2022–23	Sarah Anderson	Andrew Stopera	2023 USMDCC (silver)
2023–24	Sarah Anderson	Andrew Stopera	2024 USMDCC (7th)
2024–25	Sarah Anderson	Andrew Stopera	2025 USMDOT (silver)
2025–26	Sarah Anderson	Andrew Stopera	2026 USMDCC (bronze)
