= Taylor Anderson-Heide =

American curler (born 1995)

- Curler
- Born: February 25, 1995 (age 31); Broomall, Pennsylvania, U.S.

Team
- Curling club: Philadelphia CC, Philadelphia, PA
- Skip: Tabitha Peterson
- Third: Cory Thiesse
- Second: Tara Peterson
- Lead: Taylor Anderson-Heide
- Mixed doubles partner: Ben Richardson

Curling career
- Member Association: United States
- World Championship: 4 (2019, 2022, 2025, 2026)
- Pan Continental Championship: 2 (2024, 2025)
- Olympic: 1 (2026)
Medal record
Curling
Representing United States
World Junior Championships
Silver medal – second place	2016 Copenhagen
Representing Minnesota
U.S. Women's Championship
Gold medal – first place	2019 Kalamazoo
Gold medal – first place	2021 Wausau
Gold medal – first place	2025 Duluth
Silver medal – second place	2018 Fargo
Silver medal – second place	2020 Cheney
Silver medal – second place	2024 East Rutherford
Bronze medal – third place	2016 Jacksonville
Bronze medal – third place	2023 Denver
U.S. Olympic Trials
Gold medal – first place	2025 Sioux Falls
Bronze medal – third place	2017 Omaha

Taylor Anderson-Heide (/ˈhaɪdiː/ HY-dee; born February 25, 1995 as Taylor Anderson) is an American curler from Chaska, Minnesota. She currently plays lead on Team Tabitha Peterson. Along with her twin sister Sarah, she was United States National Champion in 2019 and World Junior silver medalist in 2016.

== Curling career ==
=== Juniors ===
Anderson-Heide was a member of Team USA at the 2012 Winter Youth Olympics, playing lead on the team, which was skipped by Korey Dropkin. They finished in fifth place. In the mixed doubles event, Anderson-Heide was paired with Great Britain's Duncan Menzies. The pair were eliminated in the quarterfinals.

Anderson-Heide was the alternate for Team USA (skipped by Cory Christensen) at the 2015 World Junior Curling Championships. The team finished in 5th place, and Anderson-Heide played in two games. The next season, Anderson-Heide was promoted to second on the team. The team represented the United States at the 2016 World Junior Curling Championships, where they made it all the way to the gold medal final, where they lost to Canada.

=== Women's ===
Anderson-Heide made her debut at the United States Women's Curling Championship in 2013 playing lead for her twin sister Sarah's team. The team finished the event with a 2–7 record. Anderson-Heide played in the 2014 United States Women's Curling Championship playing second for her sister. The team finished with a 4–5 record.

In 2014, the Anderson twins joined the Christensen rink to play in both juniors and women's events. The team won a World Curling Tour (WCT) event in their first season, the 2014 Molson Cash Spiel. The team played in the 2015 United States Women's Curling Championship, finishing fourth. The next season the team won another WCT event, the 2015 St. Paul Cash Spiel. Later that season, they finished third at the 2016 United States Women's Curling Championship. The team won the St. Paul Cash Spiel again in 2016 and finished fifth at the 2017 United States Women's Curling Championship. In their last season together, the team finished 2nd at the 2018 United States Women's Curling Championship and was also one of three invited to the 2017 United States Olympic Curling Trials, where they finished last with just one win. After the 2017–18 season, both Taylor and Sarah Anderson joined the Jamie Sinclair rink. In their first year together, the team won the 2019 United States Women's Curling Championship and represented the U.S. at the 2019 World Women's Curling Championship, finishing with a 6–6 record.

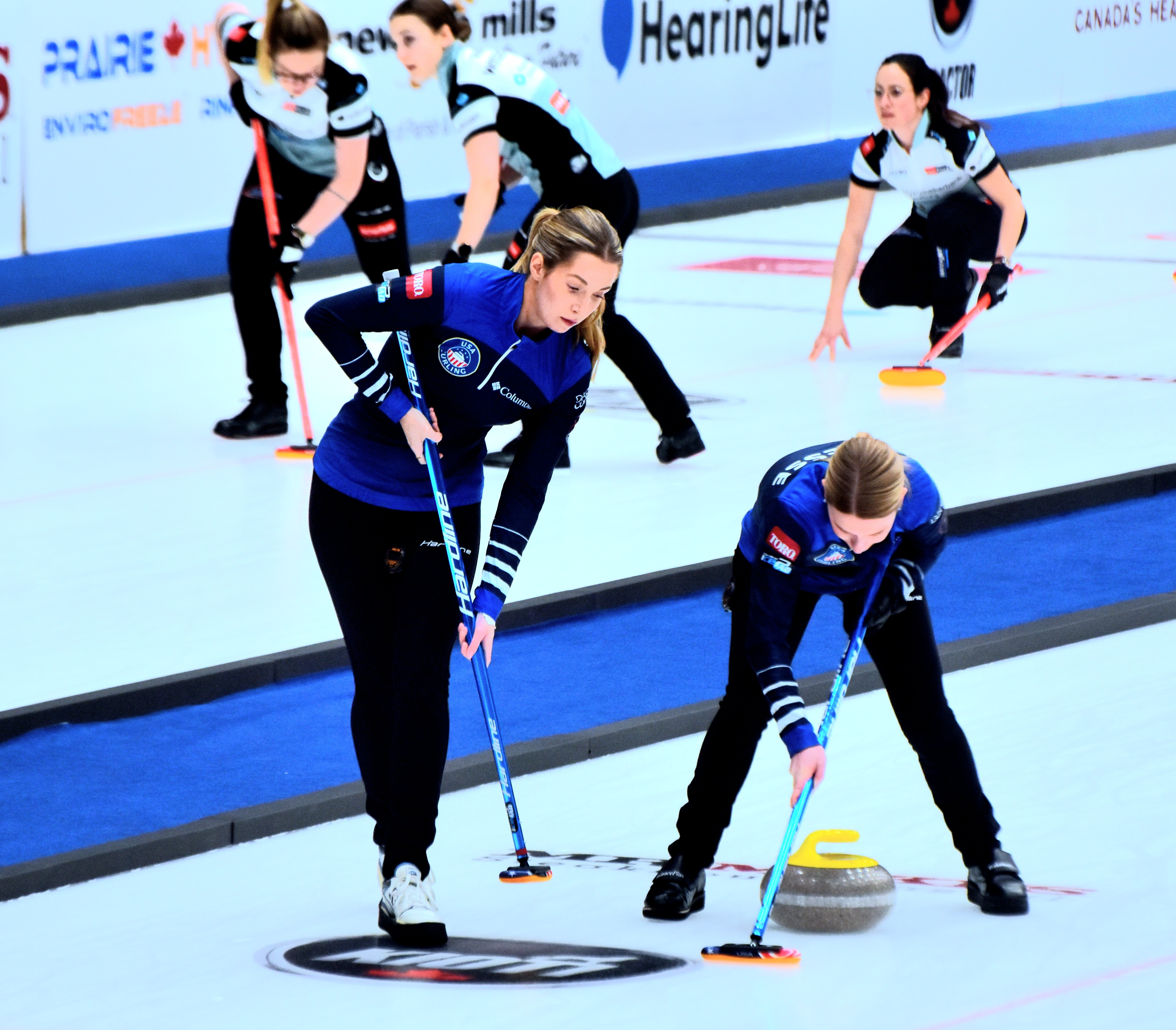
Anderson-Heide (left) with Cory Thiesse.

Anderson-Heide would join the Tabitha Peterson rink as lead in the 2024–25 curling season, where in their first season together, the team won the 2025 United States Women's Curling Championship over Elizabeth Cousins 7–6 in an extra end. This would qualify the team to represent the United States at the 2025 World Women's Curling Championship. At World's they would struggle, finishing round robin play with a 3–9 record, placing 12th. Team Peterson would rebound and win the 2025 United States Olympic curling trials, qualifying them to represent the United States at the 2025 Olympic Qualification Event. There, they would finish round robin play with a 5–2 record, then beat Norway's Marianne Rørvik 8–4 to qualify for the 2026 Winter Olympics.

=== Mixed doubles ===
Anderson-Heide made her debut in mixed doubles during the 2014–15 curling season, curling with Scott Dunnam, where they lost in the semifinals of the 2015 United States Mixed Doubles Curling Championship. Anderson-Heide would then join forces with Ben Richardson during the 2022–23 season where they would continue to have strong showings at the 2023 and 2024 national championships, losing in the semifinals in both events. Anderson-Heide and Richardson would also finish 4th at the 2024 United States Mixed Doubles Olympic Pre-Trials, qualifying them for the 2025 United States Mixed Doubles Curling Olympic Trials, where they went 5–4 in the round robin, and finished 4th after losing in the 3v4 game to Madison Bear and Aidan Oldenburg 10–9 in an extra end.

== Personal life ==
Anderson-Heide attended the University of Minnesota. She is employed as a marketing assistant and as an assistant ice technician. Her parents are Canadian. In 2024, she married Ryan Heide in Hilton Head Island, South Carolina.

== Teams ==
=== Women's ===
Season	Skip	Third	Second	Lead	Alternate	Coach	Events
2007–08	Sarah Anderson	Kristin Pohlman	Julia Pohlman	Taylor Anderson	Meagan Hudson	Wayne Anderson	2008 USJCC (9th)
2012–13	Sarah Anderson	Kathleen Dubberstein	Taylor Anderson	Leilani Dubberstein	Abigail Suslavich	Tyler George	2013 USJCC (4th)
2012–13	Sarah Anderson	Courtney Slata	Kathleen Dubberstein	Taylor Anderson			2013 USWCC (9th)
2013–14	Sarah Anderson	Kathleen Dubberstein	Taylor Anderson	Leilani Dubberstein		Wayne Anderson	2014 USJCC (silver)
2013–14	Sarah Anderson	Taylor Anderson	Courtney Anderson-Slata	Emily Anderson			2014 USWCC (6th)
2014–15	Cory Christensen	Sarah Anderson	Mackenzie Lank	Jenna Haag	Taylor Anderson	John Benton	2015 USJCC (gold); 2015 USWCC (4th); 2015 WJCC (5th)
2015–16	Cory Christensen	Sarah Anderson	Taylor Anderson	Madison Bear	Christine McMakin	Dave Jensen	2016 USJCC (gold); 2016 USWCC (bronze); 2016 WJCC (silver)
2016–17	Cory Christensen	Sarah Anderson	Taylor Anderson	Jenna Haag		Ann Swisshelm	2017 USWCC (5th)
2017–18	Cory Christensen	Sarah Anderson	Taylor Anderson	Jenna Martin		Phill Drobnick	2017 USOCT (3rd); 2018 USWCC (silver)
2018–19	Jamie Sinclair	Sarah Anderson	Taylor Anderson	Monica Walker	Vicky Persinger (WWCC)	Bryan Cochrane	2019 USWCC (gold); 2019 WWCC (7th)
2019–20	Jamie Sinclair	Cory Christensen	Vicky Persinger	Taylor Anderson	Sarah Anderson	Cathy Overton-Clapham	2020 USWCC (silver)
2020–21	Cory Christensen	Sarah Anderson	Vicky Persinger	Taylor Anderson		Cathy Overton-Clapham	2021 USWCC (gold)
2021–22	Cory Christensen	Sarah Anderson	Vicky Persinger	Taylor Anderson			2021 USOCT (silver); 2022 WWCC (5th)
2022–23	Sarah Anderson	Taylor Anderson	Lexi Lanigan	Leah Yavarow			2023 USWCC (bronze)
2023–24	Sarah Anderson	Taylor Anderson	Lexi Lanigan	Leah Yavarow			2024 USWCC (silver)
2024–25	Tabitha Peterson	Cory Thiesse	Tara Peterson	Taylor Anderson-Heide	Vicky Persinger	Cathy Overton-Clapham	2025 USWCC (gold); 2025 WWCC (12th)
2024–25	Cory Thiesse	Vicky Persinger	Tara Peterson	Taylor Anderson-Heide	Aileen Geving	Cathy Overton-Clapham	2024 PCCC (5th)
2025–26	Tabitha Peterson	Cory Thiesse	Tara Peterson	Taylor Anderson-Heide		Cathy Overton-Clapham	

=== Mixed doubles ===
Season	Female	Male	Events
2014–15	Taylor Anderson	Scott Dunnam	2015 USMDCC (SF)
2015–16	Taylor Anderson	Alex Fenson	2016 USMDCC (DNQ)
2017–18	Taylor Anderson	Hunter Clawson	2018 USMDCC (QF)
2018–19	Taylor Anderson	Derrick McLean	2019 USMDCC (DNQ)
2020–21	Taylor Anderson	Hunter Clawson	2021 USMDCC (DNQ)
2021–22	Taylor Anderson	Hunter Clawson	2022 USMDCC (7th)
2022–23	Taylor Anderson	Ben Richardson	2023 USMDCC (SF)
2023–24	Taylor Anderson	Ben Richardson	2024 USMDCC (4th)
2024–25	Taylor Anderson-Heide	Ben Richardson	2025 USMDOT (4th)
