= 2019 United States Women's Curling Championship =

- Host city: Kalamazoo, Michigan
- Arena: Wings Event Center
- Dates: February 9–16
- Winner: (Minnesota) Jamie Sinclair
- Curling club: Chaska Curling Center, Chaska, Minnesota
- Skip: Jamie Sinclair
- Third: Sarah Anderson
- Second: Taylor Anderson
- Lead: Monica Walker

The 2019 United States Women's Curling Championship was held from February 9 to 16 in Kalamazoo, Michigan. It was held in conjunction with the 2019 United States Men's Curling Championship.

== Teams ==
Eight teams qualified to participate in the 2019 national championship.

Skip	Third	Second	Lead	Locale
Cory Christensen	Vicky Persinger	Jenna Martin	Madison Bear	Duluth, Minnesota
Annmarie Dubberstein	Cora Farrell	Jenna Burchesky	Allison Howell	Portage, Wisconsin
Ann Podoll	Carissa Thomas	Rachel Workin	Christina Lammars	Fargo, North Dakota
Kim Rhyme	Kathleen Dubberstein	Katie Rhyme	Amy Harnden	Minneapolis, Minnesota
Nina Roth	Tabitha Peterson	Becca Hamilton	Tara Peterson	Madison, Wisconsin
Stephanie Senneker	Rebecca Andrew	Emilia Juocys	Maya Willertz	Port Huron, Michigan
Jamie Sinclair	Sarah Anderson	Taylor Anderson	Monica Walker	Chaska, Minnesota
Emily Quello (fourth)	Susan Dudt	Rebecca Rodgers	Ariel Traxler (skip)	Fairbanks, Alaska

== Round-robin standings ==
Final round-robin standings.

Key
Teams to playoffs

Skip	W	L
(Minnesota) Jamie Sinclair	6	1
(Wisconsin) Nina Roth	6	1
(Minnesota) Cory Christensen	5	2
(Michigan) Stephanie Senneker	5	2
(Wisconsin) Annmarie Dubberstein	3	4
(Alaska) Ariel Traxler	2	5
(North Dakota) Ann Podoll	1	6
(Minnesota) Kim Rhyme	0	7

== Round-robin results ==
All draw times are listed in Eastern Standard Time (UTC−7).

=== Draw 1 ===
Sunday, February 10, 12:00 pm

Team	1	2	3	4	5	6	7	8	9	10	Final
Ariel Traxler	0	0	1	0	0	0	1	0	X	X	2
Jamie Sinclair 🔨	2	2	0	1	1	1	0	1	X	X	8

Team	1	2	3	4	5	6	7	8	9	10	Final
Ann Podoll 🔨	0	3	0	1	1	0	1	1	0	X	7
Kim Rhyme	0	0	1	0	0	3	0	0	1	X	5

Team	1	2	3	4	5	6	7	8	9	10	Final
Cory Christensen	0	0	2	0	1	1	0	0	2	2	8
Annmarie Dubberstein 🔨	0	1	0	1	0	0	1	1	0	0	4

Team	1	2	3	4	5	6	7	8	9	10	Final
Stephanie Senneker	0	0	1	0	0	1	1	0	0	X	3
Nina Roth 🔨	1	0	0	1	2	0	0	1	2	X	7

=== Draw 2 ===
Sunday, February 10, 8:00 pm

Team	1	2	3	4	5	6	7	8	9	10	Final
Cory Christensen	0	2	0	3	1	0	2	0	3	X	11
Kim Rhyme 🔨	2	0	1	0	0	1	0	1	0	X	5

Team	1	2	3	4	5	6	7	8	9	10	Final
Nina Roth 🔨	2	0	1	0	0	0	2	1	0	0	6
Jamie Sinclair	0	2	0	0	1	0	0	0	3	3	9

Team	1	2	3	4	5	6	7	8	9	10	Final
Ariel Traxler	1	0	0	1	0	1	1	0	2	0	6
Stephanie Senneker 🔨	0	2	0	0	2	0	0	2	0	1	7

Team	1	2	3	4	5	6	7	8	9	10	Final
Ann Podoll 🔨	0	1	1	1	0	0	1	0	1	0	5
Annmarie Dubberstein	1	0	0	0	2	2	0	1	0	1	7

=== Draw 3 ===
Monday, February 11, 2:00 pm

Team	1	2	3	4	5	6	7	8	9	10	Final
Stephanie Senneker 🔨	1	1	0	2	0	3	0	1	1	X	9
Ann Podoll	0	0	1	0	1	0	2	0	0	X	4

Team	1	2	3	4	5	6	7	8	9	10	Final
Ariel Traxler 🔨	1	0	0	0	1	0	1	0	0	X	3
Annmarie Dubberstein	0	2	0	1	0	2	0	2	2	X	9

Team	1	2	3	4	5	6	7	8	9	10	Final
Kim Rhyme	0	0	2	0	1	0	0	0	X	X	3
Nina Roth 🔨	2	0	0	3	0	2	1	1	X	X	9

Team	1	2	3	4	5	6	7	8	9	10	Final
Cory Christensen 🔨	0	0	1	0	1	0	2	0	3	0	7
Jamie Sinclair	1	2	0	1	0	1	0	2	0	1	8

=== Draw 4 ===
Tuesday, February 12, 9:00 am

Team	1	2	3	4	5	6	7	8	9	10	Final
Annmarie Dubberstein	0	0	1	1	0	0	0	1	1	X	4
Nina Roth 🔨	2	1	0	0	0	4	1	0	0	X	8

Team	1	2	3	4	5	6	7	8	9	10	Final
Kim Rhyme	0	2	0	1	0	0	0	0	X	X	3
Jamie Sinclair 🔨	3	0	2	0	1	0	0	3	X	X	9

Team	1	2	3	4	5	6	7	8	9	10	Final
Ann Podoll	0	2	0	1	0	0	2	0	X	X	5
Ariel Traxler 🔨	2	0	4	0	2	1	0	4	X	X	13

Team	1	2	3	4	5	6	7	8	9	10	Final
Stephanie Senneker 🔨	0	0	1	0	0	1	3	0	0	X	5
Cory Christensen	2	1	0	2	1	0	0	2	1	X	9

=== Draw 5 ===
Tuesday, February 12, 7:00 pm

Team	1	2	3	4	5	6	7	8	9	10	Final
Nina Roth	1	0	3	3	1	0	2	X	X	X	10
Cory Christensen 🔨	0	2	0	0	0	1	0	X	X	X	3

Team	1	2	3	4	5	6	7	8	9	10	Final
Annmarie Dubberstein 🔨	0	0	1	0	2	0	3	0	0	0	6
Stephanie Senneker	0	1	0	1	0	1	0	1	2	2	8

Team	1	2	3	4	5	6	7	8	9	10	Final
Jamie Sinclair 🔨	3	3	0	3	0	0	2	X	X	X	11
Ann Podoll	0	0	1	0	1	1	0	X	X	X	3

Team	1	2	3	4	5	6	7	8	9	10	Final
Kim Rhyme 🔨	1	0	0	1	0	2	0	2	0	0	6
Ariel Traxler	0	0	3	0	1	0	1	0	2	1	8

=== Draw 6 ===
Wednesday, February 13, 2:00 pm

Team	1	2	3	4	5	6	7	8	9	10	Final
Ann Podoll	0	0	1	0	2	0	2	3	0	0	8
Cory Christensen 🔨	3	1	0	2	0	2	0	0	1	1	10

Team	1	2	3	4	5	6	7	8	9	10	Final
Jamie Sinclair 🔨	1	0	0	1	0	0	0	2	0	0	4
Stephanie Senneker	0	0	1	0	1	0	1	0	2	1	6

Team	1	2	3	4	5	6	7	8	9	10	Final
Ariel Traxler	0	0	2	0	1	1	1	0	0	X	5
Nina Roth 🔨	2	0	0	6	0	0	0	1	2	X	11

Team	1	2	3	4	5	6	7	8	9	10	Final
Annmarie Dubberstein	0	1	3	2	0	1	0	2	X	X	9
Kim Rhyme 🔨	0	0	0	0	2	0	2	0	X	X	4

=== Draw 7 ===
Thursday, February 14, 11:00 am

Team	1	2	3	4	5	6	7	8	9	10	Final
Jamie Sinclair 🔨	0	0	3	0	0	1	0	2	0	1	7
Annmarie Dubberstein	0	1	0	0	1	0	2	0	1	0	5

Team	1	2	3	4	5	6	7	8	9	10	Final
Cory Christensen 🔨	2	0	1	0	2	0	2	0	0	1	8
Ariel Traxler	0	1	0	2	0	1	0	3	0	0	7

Team	1	2	3	4	5	6	7	8	9	10	11	Final
Stephanie Senneker 🔨	0	1	2	0	0	1	0	0	1	0	1	6
Kim Rhyme	1	0	0	1	0	0	1	1	0	1	0	5

Team	1	2	3	4	5	6	7	8	9	10	Final
Nina Roth 🔨	2	3	0	1	0	1	1	0	2	X	10
Ann Podoll	0	0	1	0	2	0	0	1	0	X	4

== Playoffs ==
Page playoff system
1	(Minnesota) Jamie Sinclair	9
2	(Wisconsin) Nina Roth	8
3	(Minnesota) Cory Christensen	9
4	(Michigan) Stephanie Senneker	8

Semifinal
2	(Wisconsin) Nina Roth	7
3	(Minnesota) Cory Christensen	5

Final
1	(Minnesota) Jamie Sinclair	6
2	(Wisconsin) Nina Roth	4

=== 1 vs. 2 ===
Friday, February 15, 1:00 pm

Team	1	2	3	4	5	6	7	8	9	10	Final
(Minnesota) Jamie Sinclair 🔨	0	3	0	3	0	0	0	1	0	2	9
(Wisconsin) Nina Roth	2	0	1	0	3	1	0	0	1	0	8

Player percentages
(Minnesota) Jamie Sinclair		(Wisconsin) Nina Roth	
Monica Walker	86%	Tara Peterson	72%
Taylor Anderson	87%	Becca Hamilton	82%
Sarah Anderson	70%	Tabitha Peterson	76%
Jamie Sinclair	82%	Nina Roth	81%
Total	81%	Total	78%

=== 3 vs. 4 ===
Friday, February 15, 1:00 pm

Team	1	2	3	4	5	6	7	8	9	10	11	Final
(Minnesota) Cory Christensen 🔨	1	0	2	0	1	0	2	0	2	0	1	9
(Michigan) Stephanie Senneker	0	1	0	3	0	2	0	1	0	1	0	8

Player percentages
(Minnesota) Cory Christensen		(Michigan) Stephanie Senneker	
Madison Bear	71%	Maya Willertz	69%
Jenna Martin	90%	Emilia Juocys	74%
Vicky Persinger	79%	Rebecca Andrew	82%
Cory Christensen	85%	Stephanie Senneker	80%
Total	81%	Total	76%

=== Semifinal ===
Friday, February 15, 7:00 pm

Team	1	2	3	4	5	6	7	8	9	10	Final
(Wisconsin) Nina Roth 🔨	1	0	2	0	1	0	0	2	0	1	7
(Minnesota) Cory Christensen	0	2	0	2	0	0	0	0	1	0	5

Player percentages
(Wisconsin) Nina Roth		(Minnesota) Cory Christensen	
Tara Peterson	89%	Madison Bear	91%
Becca Hamilton	66%	Jenna Martin	69%
Tabitha Peterson	81%	Vicky Persinger	72%
Nina Roth	86%	Cory Christensen	75%
Total	81%	Total	77%

=== Final ===
Saturday, February 16, 11:00 am ET

Team	1	2	3	4	5	6	7	8	9	10	Final
(Minnesota) Jamie Sinclair 🔨	1	1	0	0	2	0	0	1	0	1	6
(Wisconsin) Nina Roth	0	0	0	1	0	1	1	0	1	0	4

Player percentages
(Minnesota) Jamie Sinclair		(Wisconsin) Nina Roth	
Monica Walker	86%	Tara Peterson	94%
Taylor Anderson	65%	Becca Hamilton	91%
Sarah Anderson	77%	Tabitha Peterson	77%
Jamie Sinclair	80%	Nina Roth	76%
Total	77%	Total	84%
