= Jenna Martin (curler) =

American curler (born 1993)

- Curler ♀
- Born: Jenna Haag; August 19, 1993 (age 33); Janesville, Wisconsin, United States

Curling career
- Member Association: United States
- World Championship: 1 (2018)
- Other appearances: World Junior Championships: 2 (2008, 2015)
Medal record
Curling
United States Olympic Curling Trials
Silver medal – second place	2017 Omaha
United States Women's Championship
Silver medal – second place	2018 Fargo
Bronze medal – third place	2019 Kalamazoo

Jenna Martin (born August 19, 1993, in Janesville, Wisconsin as Jenna Haag) is an American curler. Martin is a two-time United States Junior Curling Champion, in 2008 on Nina Spatola's team and in 2015 on Cory Christensen's team.

== Teams ==
Season	Skip	Third	Second	Lead	Alternate	Coach	Events
2007–08	Nina Spatola	Becca Hamilton	Anna Plys	Jenna Haag	Karlie Koenig (WJCC)	Neil Doese	2008 USJCC (gold); 2008 WJCC (8th)
2008–09	Miranda Schieber	Karlie Koenig	Jenna Haag	Leila Smith		Rusty Schieber	2009 USJCC (bronze)
2009–10	Becca Hamilton	Karlie Koenig	Jenna Haag	Grace Gabower			2010 USJCC (silver); 2010 USWCC (4th)
2010–11	Jenna Haag	Chloe Pahl	Grace Gabower	Erin Wallace	Joy Pahl	Ann Swisshelm	2011 USWCC (7th)
2011–12	Jenna Haag	Chloe Pahl	Grace Gabower	Erin Wallace	Kendall Moulton		2012 USJCC (5th)
2012–13	Jenna Haag	Chloe Pahl	Grace Gabower	Erin Wallace	Brittany Falk		2013 USJCC (bronze)
2013–14	Jenna Haag	Erin Wallace	Grace Gabower	Brittany Falk	Abbey Suslavich	Wally Henry	2014 USJCC (bronze)
2014–15	Cory Christensen	Sarah Anderson	Mackenzie Lank	Jenna Haag	Taylor Anderson	John Benton	2015 USJCC (gold); 2015 USWCC (4th); 2015 WJCC (5th)
2015–16	Jamie Sinclair	Tabitha Peterson	Becca Hamilton	Jenna Haag	Tara Peterson	Ann Swisshelm	2016 USWCC (4th)
2016–17	Cory Christensen	Sarah Anderson	Taylor Anderson	Jenna Haag		Ann Swisshelm	2017 USWCC (5th)
2017–18	Cory Christensen	Sarah Anderson	Taylor Anderson	Jenna Martin	Natalie Nicholson (USWCC)	Phill Drobnick	2017 USOCT (bronze); 2018 USWCC (silver)
2017–18	Jamie Sinclair	Alexandra Carlson	Vicky Persinger	Monica Walker	Jenna Martin	Scott Baird	2018 WWCC (4th)
2018–19	Cory Christensen	Vicky Persinger	Jenna Martin	Madison Bear	Linda Christensen (USWCC)	Pete Fenson	CWC/3 (5th); 2019 USWCC (bronze)

== Personal life ==
She graduated from the University of Wisconsin-Milwaukee.
