= Nina Roth =

American curler (born 1988)

- Curler
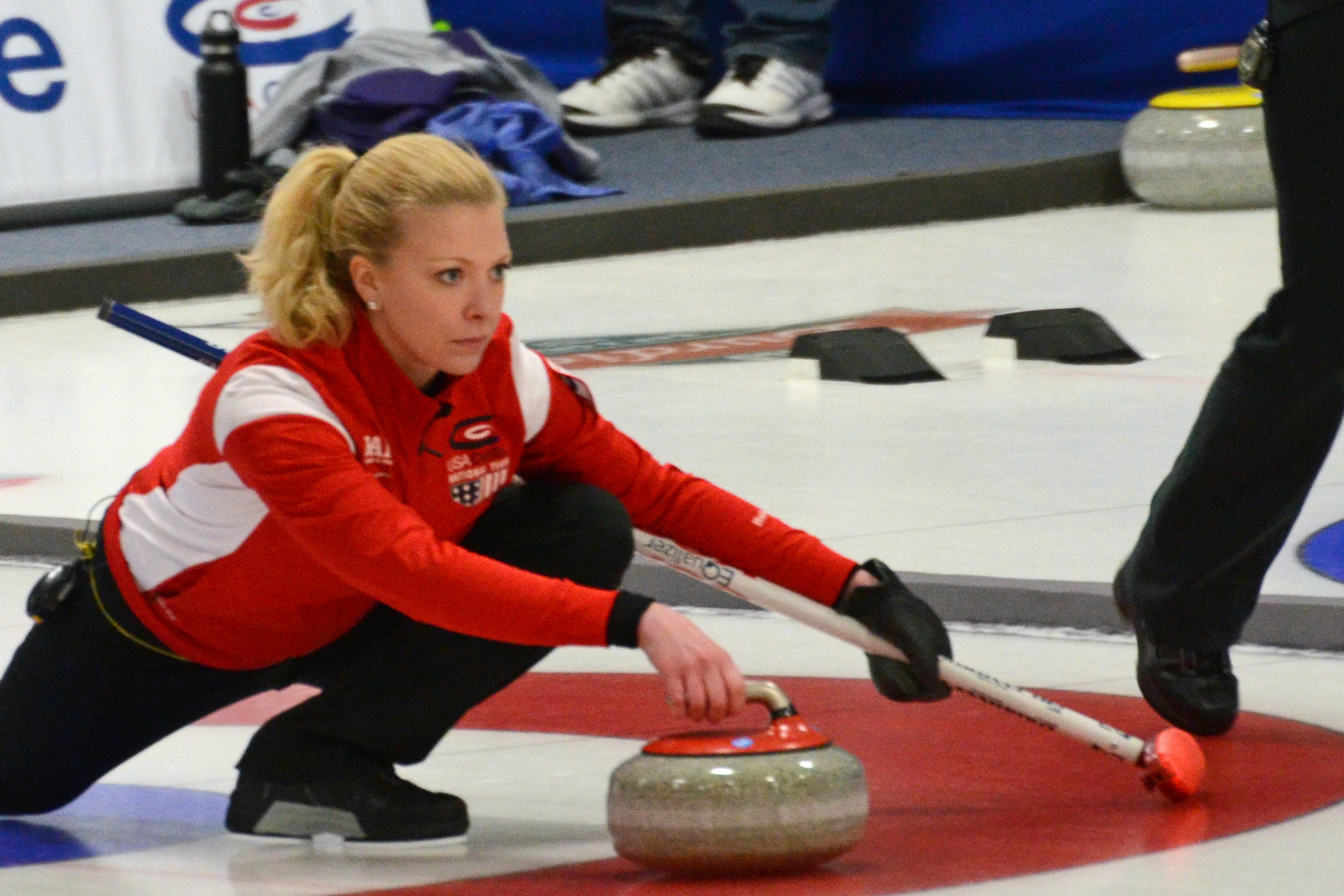
- Roth delivers a stone at the 2015 U.S. Championship
- Other names: Nina Marie Roth
- Born: Nina Marie Spatola; July 21, 1988 (age 38); McFarland, Wisconsin, U.S.
- Height: 5 ft 5 in (165 cm)

Team
- Curling club: Madison CC, Madison, WI
- Mixed doubles partner: Kroy Nernberger

Curling career
- Member Association: United States
- World Championship: 3 (2010, 2017, 2021)
- Olympic: 2 (2018, 2022)
Medal record
Women's curling
Representing United States
World Championships
Bronze medal – third place	2021 Calgary
United States Women's Championship
Gold medal – first place	2010 Kalamazoo
Gold medal – first place	2014 Philadelphia
Silver medal – second place	2016 Jacksonville
Silver medal – second place	2017 Everett
Silver medal – second place	2019 Kalamazoo
United States Olympic Trials
Gold medal – first place	2017 Omaha
Gold medal – first place	2021 Omaha

Nina Marie Roth (née Spatola; born July 21, 1988) is a retired American curler from McFarland, Wisconsin. She was the skip of the American women's team at the 2018 Winter Olympics and the third at the 2022 Winter Olympics.

== Career ==
=== Women ===
Roth began curling in 1998 and six years later played in her first United States Junior National Championship. She would compete in five more Junior Nationals, winning the title in 2006 and 2008. As a member of the Junior Championship team, she qualified for two World Junior Curling Championships. Skipping the teams both times, she finished tenth at the 2006 World Junior Curling Championships and seventh at the 2008 World Junior Curling Championships.

Roth's senior career began in 2009 as the third for Erika Brown's team. They qualified for the 2009 US Nationals, where they placed fourth.

Roth returned to the United States Nationals in March 2010, where Team Brown won the National Championship, earning the right to compete as Team USA at the 2010 Swift Current World Championships. There they lost in a tiebreaker match, settling for fifth place. In her last season as a member of the Brown rink, the team would finish in fourth place at 2011 Nationals. On the World Curling Tour, the Roth rink played in three Grand Slam events making it as far as the quarterfinals at the 2010 Sobeys Slam.

In 2011, Roth joined the Patti Lank rink as third. They finished in eighth place at the 2012 United States Women's Curling Championship. They played in just one Grand Slam that season, the 2011 Curlers Corner Autumn Gold Curling Classic, failing to qualify. Elsewhere on the tour, the team won the St. Paul Cash Spiel. The following season, Roth moved to play second on the team. The team played in the 2013 United States Women's Curling Championship and finished in fifth place after losing in a tiebreaker. Also that season, the team defended their title at the St. Paul Cash Spiel.

At the start of the 2013–14 curling season, Roth joined Becca Hamilton's rink as their skip, and Hamilton throwing third stones. The team would win the 2014 United States Women's Curling Championship but did not have enough tour points to represent the United States at that year's World Championship. The following season, Jamie Sinclair was added as the team's third, Hamilton moved to play second, and Tara Peterson was added at lead position. The team had less success at the 2015 United States Women's Curling Championship, just missing the playoffs with a 4–5 record. The team played in two slams on the tour but missed the playoffs in both.

In 2015 Roth formed a new team consisting of Monica Walker, Aileen Sormunen, and Vicky Persinger. The team made it to the finals of the 2016 United States Women's Curling Championship, where they lost to Roth's former skip, Erika Brown. The following season, Becca Hamilton returned to the team to play lead, Geving was moved to second, and Tabitha Peterson was added to play third. The team lost in the finals at the 2017 Nationals to Jamie Sinclair. However, they had enough points on the tour to represent the United States at the 2017 World Women's Curling Championship. There they just missed the playoffs, finishing with a 6–5 record. On the tour, they won one event, the Molson Cash Spiel. That season the team also represented the United States at the 2017 Americas Challenge, where they easily beat Brazil to qualify the U.S. for the 2017 Worlds.

The team would get the best of Sinclair at the 2017 United States Olympic Curling Trials, where they defeated the Sinclair rink in the final, winning the right to represent the United States at the 2018 Winter Olympics. There Roth led the United States to a 4–5 record, missing the playoffs. Because they played in the Olympics, Team Roth opted to skip the 2018 US Nationals. On the tour that season they won the Canad Inns Women's Classic and played in two slams, making it as far as the quarterfinals at the 2018 Players' Championship.

Team Roth attempted to defend their title at the 2019 United States Women's Curling Championship but lost out to Team Sinclair in the final. They had better luck on the Grand Slam tour, making it to the semifinals of the 2018 Tour Challenge and the 2019 Canadian Open. Her team also represented the United States in the First Leg and the Grand Final of the 2018–19 Curling World Cup, finishing with a 3–3 and 2–4 record respectively.

The team's first World Curling Tour event of the 2019–20 season was the 2019 AMJ Campbell Shorty Jenkins Classic, where they missed the playoffs. The following week, they won the Beyer & Simonson US Open of Curling. They also won their next event, the 2019 WCT Uiseong International Curling Cup, defeating Kim Eun-jung in the final. Roth missed most of the season while on maternity leave, with Tabitha Peterson skipping the team. During the 2020 off-season, the team announced that Peterson would remain as skip when Roth returned from maternity leave. Roth re-joined the team as vice-skip at third, with Hamilton moving to second, Tara Peterson to lead, and Geving to alternate.

Due to the COVID-19 pandemic, the Peterson team did not compete in events for most of the 2020–21 season until entering a bio-secure bubble held in Calgary, Alberta in the spring of 2021 for three events in a row. The first two events were the Champions Cup and Players' Championship grand slams, with the team missing the playoffs at both. The third event in the Calgary bubble for Team Peterson was the 2021 World Women's Championship, in which they earned a spot as 2020 National Champions after the 2021 National Championship was moved to later in the spring due to the pandemic. They finished the 13-game round-robin in fifth place with a 7–6 record, earning them a spot in the playoffs and securing a 2022 Olympic berth for the United States. In the playoffs, Team Peterson defeated Denmark's Madeline Dupont but lost to Switzerland's Silvana Tirinzoni to end up in the bronze medal game. There, Peterson faced off against Sweden's Anna Hasselborg and won with a score of 9–5, including scoring five points in the seventh end. Team Peterson's bronze medal finish was the first World Women's medal for the United States in 15 years, and the first-ever bronze medal.

The Peterson rink won their first two events of the 2021–22 season, the US Open of Curling and the 2021 Curlers Corner Autumn Gold Curling Classic. The following week, they played in the 2021 Masters where they made it as far as the quarterfinals. The team then played in the 2021 United States Olympic Curling Trials, where they attempted to return to the Olympics. Through the round robin, the team posted a 9–1 record, putting them into the best-of-three final against Cory Christensen. The Peterson rink beat Christensen in two-straight games, booking their tickets to the 2022 Winter Olympics. After the Trials, the team played in one event before the Olympics, the Curl Mesabi Classic, which they won, beating Christensen again in the final. At the Olympics, the team finished the round robin with a 4–5 record, missing the playoffs. The team finished off the season by playing in two Slams, the 2022 Players' Championship and the 2022 Champions Cup, missing the playoffs in both events.

On May 13, 2022, Roth announced that she would be stepping away from competitive curling.

=== Mixed Doubles ===
Two years after announcing her retirement from competitive curling, Roth returned to national-level curling at the 2025 United States Mixed Doubles Curling Olympic Trials, playing with Kroy Nernberger. They would finish just outside the playoffs in 6th place with a 5–4 record, being eliminated on head-to-head results.

== Personal life ==
Roth earned a nursing degree from Edgewood College and works as a registered nurse. She married Tony Roth in 2014 and they have one child. She is of Italian descent.

== Teams ==
Season	Skip	Third	Second	Lead	Alternate	Coach	Events
2003–04	Nina Spatola	Kayla Kaschinske	Katie Bland	Andrea Cooper		Steve Brown	2004 USJCC (7th)
2004–05	Nina Spatola	Jordan Moulton	Erin Schaefer	Andrea Mueller		Jim Dexter	2005 USJCC (SF)
2005–06	Nina Spatola	Megan O'Connell	Jaclyn Mueller	Jordan Moulton	Molly Bonner		2006 USJCC (gold); 2006 WJCC (10th)
2006–07	Nina Spatola	Amanda McLean	Kayla Kaschinske	Megan Pond			2007 USJCC (bronze)
2007–08	Nina Spatola	Becca Hamilton	Anna Plys	Jenna Haag			2008 USJCC (gold); 2008 WJCC (8th)
2008–09	Nina Spatola	Molly Bonner	Becca Hamilton	Anna Plys		Lisa Schoeneberg	2009 USJCC (silver)
2008–09	Erika Brown	Nina Spatola	Nina Reiniger	Laura Hallisey			2009 USOCT (4th)
2009–10	Erika Brown	Nina Spatola	Ann Swisshelm	Laura Hallisey	Jessica Schultz (Note: for WWCC)	Bill Todhunter	2010 USWCC (gold); 2010 WWCC (5th)
2010–11	Erika Brown	Nina Spatola	Ann Swisshelm	Laura Hallisey	Debbie McCormick		2011 USWCC (4th); 2011 Cont. Cup
2011–12	Patti Lank	Nina Spatola	Caitlin Maroldo	Molly Bonner	Mackenzie Lank		2012 USWCC (8th)
2011–12	Patti Lank	Nina Spatola	Caitlin Maroldo	Mackenzie Lank			2012 Cont. Cup
2012–13	Patti Lank	Mackenzie Lank	Nina Spatola	Caitlin Maroldo			2013 USWCC (5th)
2013–14	Nina Spatola	Becca Hamilton	Tara Peterson	Sophie Brorson			2014 USWCC (gold)
2014–15	Nina Roth	Jamie Sinclair	Becca Hamilton	Tabitha Peterson			2015 USWCC (5th)
2015–16	Nina Roth	Monica Walker	Aileen Sormunen	Vicky Persinger			2016 USWCC (silver)
2016–17	Nina Roth	Tabitha Peterson	Aileen Geving	Becca Hamilton	Cory Christensen	Ann Swisshelm	2017 USWCC (silver); 2017 WWCC (5th)
2017–18	Nina Roth	Tabitha Peterson	Aileen Geving	Becca Hamilton	Cory Christensen (Note: for WOG)	Al Hackner	2017 USOCT (gold); 2018 WOG (8th); 2018 Cont. Cup
2018–19	Nina Roth	Tabitha Peterson	Becca Hamilton	Tara Peterson			2019 USWCC (silver)
2019	Nina Roth	Tabitha Peterson	Becca Hamilton	Tara Peterson	Aileen Geving		
2020–21	Tabitha Peterson	Nina Roth	Becca Hamilton	Tara Peterson	Aileen Geving	Laine Peters	2021 WWCC (bronze)
2021–22	Tabitha Peterson	Nina Roth	Becca Hamilton	Tara Peterson	Aileen Geving	Laine Peters, Phill Drobnick	2021 USOCT (gold); 2022 WOG (6th)

== Grand Slam record ==
Key
C	Champion
F	Lost in Final
SF	Lost in Semifinal
QF	Lost in Quarterfinals
R16	Lost in the round of 16
Q	Did not advance to playoffs
T2	Played in Tier 2 event
DNP	Did not participate in event
N/A	Not a Grand Slam event that season

Event	2014–15	2015–16	2016–17	2017–18	2018–19	2019–20	2020–21	2021–22
Masters	DNP	DNP	DNP	DNP	Q	DNP	N/A	QF
Tour Challenge	N/A	T2	T2	T2	SF	DNP	N/A	N/A
National	N/A	DNP	DNP	DNP	Q	DNP	N/A	DNP
Canadian Open	Q	DNP	DNP	Q	SF	DNP	N/A	N/A
Players'	DNP	DNP	DNP	QF	DNP	N/A	Q	Q
Champions Cup	N/A	DNP	DNP	DNP	DNP	N/A	Q	Q

=== Former events ===
Event	2010–11	2011–12	2012–13	2013–14	2014–15	2015–16	2016–17	2017–18	2018–19
Elite 10	N/A	N/A	N/A	N/A	N/A	N/A	N/A	N/A	Q
Sobeys Slam	QF	N/A	N/A	N/A	N/A	N/A	N/A	N/A	N/A
Manitoba Liquor & Lotteries	Q	DNP	DNP	DNP	N/A	N/A	N/A	N/A	N/A
Autumn Gold	Q	Q	DNP	DNP	DNP	N/A	N/A	N/A	N/A
Colonial Square	N/A	N/A	DNP	DNP	Q	N/A	N/A	N/A	N/A
