= 2016 United States Women's Curling Championship =

- Host city: Jacksonville, Florida
- Arena: Jacksonville Veterans Memorial Arena
- Dates: February 6–13
- Winner: (Wisconsin) Erika Brown
- Curling club: Madison CC, Madison
- Skip: Erika Brown
- Third: Allison Pottinger
- Second: Nicole Joraanstad
- Lead: Natalie Nicholson
- Finalist: (Minnesota) Nina Roth

The 2016 United States Women's Curling Championship was held from February 6 to 13 at the Jacksonville Veterans Memorial Arena in Jacksonville, Florida. It was held in conjunction with the 2016 United States Men's Curling Championship.

== Teams ==
There will be seven teams participating in this year's national championship. The teams are listed as follows:

Skip	Third	Second	Lead	Alternate	Locale
Emily Anderson	Steph Jensen	Amanda Lilla	Sherri Schummer		Broomall, Pennsylvania
Erika Brown	Allison Pottinger	Nicole Joraanstad	Natalie Nicholson		Madison, Wisconsin
Cory Christensen	Sarah Anderson	Taylor Anderson	Madison Bear	Christine McMakin	Blaine, Minnesota
Abigayle Lindgren	Katie Sigurdson	Emily Lindgren	Kelsey Colwell		(New York (state)) Lewiston, New York
Joyance Meechai	Kimberly Rhyme	Rebecca Andrew	Katie Rhyme		(New York (state)) New York, New York
Nina Roth	Monica Walker	Aileen Sormunen	Vicky Persinger		Blaine, Minnesota
Jamie Sinclair	Tabitha Peterson	Becca Hamilton	Jenna Haag	Tara Peterson	Blaine, Minnesota

== Round robin standings ==
Final round robin standings

Key
Teams to playoffs

Skip	W	L	PF	PA	Ends won	Ends Lost	Blank ends	Stolen ends	Shot pct.
(Minnesota) Nina Roth	5	1	54	34	30	22	2	9	85%
(Wisconsin) Erika Brown	5	1	45	27	25	18	3	9	87%
(Minnesota) Jamie Sinclair	5	1	54	25	28	17	6	10	87%
(Minnesota) Cory Christensen	3	3	43	46	22	29	4	3	79%
(Pennsylvania) Emily Anderson	1	5	25	52	16	25	8	5	71%
(New York (state)) Joyance Meechai	1	5	35	47	23	23	8	7	75%
(New York (state)) Abigayle Lindgren	1	5	30	55	19	29	5	4	72%

== Round robin results ==
=== Draw 1 ===
Saturday, February 6, 8:30 pm

Sheet 3	1	2	3	4	5	6	7	8	9	10	Final
(Wisconsin) Erika Brown	0	0	3	0	0	3	0	2	0	X	8
(New York (state)) Joyance Meechai	0	1	0	1	1	0	2	0	1	X	6

Sheet 4	1	2	3	4	5	6	7	8	9	10	Final
(Minnesota) Nina Roth	2	0	1	1	0	3	0	0	3	X	10
(Pennsylvania) Emily Anderson	0	1	0	0	2	0	2	1	0	X	6

Sheet 5	1	2	3	4	5	6	7	8	9	10	Final
(New York (state)) Abigayle Lindgren	0	3	2	0	2	0	0	1	0	X	8
(Minnesota) Cory Christensen	2	0	0	2	0	3	3	0	3	X	13

=== Draw 2 ===
Sunday, February 7, 12:00 pm

Sheet 1	1	2	3	4	5	6	7	8	9	10	Final
(Minnesota) Cory Christensen	0	1	0	0	0	1	0	2	0	X	4
(Minnesota) Nina Roth	0	0	1	2	3	0	2	0	1	X	9

Sheet 2	1	2	3	4	5	6	7	8	9	10	Final
(New York (state)) Abigayle Lindgren	0	0	0	1	0	0	1	X	X	X	2
(Wisconsin) Erika Brown	1	4	1	0	1	1	0	X	X	X	8

Sheet 5	1	2	3	4	5	6	7	8	9	10	Final
(Minnesota) Jamie Sinclair	2	0	0	0	1	3	3	1	X	X	10
(Pennsylvania) Emily Anderson	0	0	0	0	0	0	0	0	X	X	0

=== Draw 3 ===
Sunday, February 7, 8:00 pm

Sheet 3	1	2	3	4	5	6	7	8	9	10	Final
(Minnesota) Cory Christensen	1	0	2	0	2	0	2	0	1	0	8
(Minnesota) Jamie Sinclair	0	2	0	2	0	2	0	3	0	1	10

Sheet 4	1	2	3	4	5	6	7	8	9	10	Final
(Pennsylvania) Emily Anderson	0	0	1	0	1	0	X	X	X	X	2
(Wisconsin) Erika Brown	2	1	0	4	0	1	X	X	X	X	8

Sheet 5	1	2	3	4	5	6	7	8	9	10	Final
(New York (state)) Joyance Meechai	2	0	0	1	0	1	0	0	0	X	4
(Minnesota) Nina Roth	0	3	0	0	3	0	2	1	3	X	12

=== Draw 4 ===
Monday, February 8, 12:00 pm

Sheet 1	1	2	3	4	5	6	7	8	9	10	Final
(Wisconsin) Erika Brown	0	0	0	2	0	2	0	X	X	X	4
(Minnesota) Jamie Sinclair	0	1	4	0	4	0	1	X	X	X	10

Sheet 2	1	2	3	4	5	6	7	8	9	10	Final
(Minnesota) Nina Roth	2	0	2	3	2	0	1	1	X	X	11
(New York (state)) Abigayle Lindgren	0	4	0	0	0	1	0	0	X	X	5

Sheet 4	1	2	3	4	5	6	7	8	9	10	Final
(Minnesota) Cory Christensen	2	1	0	2	0	0	0	0	0	1	6
(New York (state)) Joyance Meechai	0	0	2	0	1	1	0	1	0	0	5

=== Draw 5 ===
Monday, February 8, 8:00 pm

Sheet 1	1	2	3	4	5	6	7	8	9	10	11	Final
(New York (state)) Joyance Meechai	0	1	2	0	1	0	0	0	2	1	0	7
(New York (state)) Abigayle Lindgren	2	0	0	2	0	1	2	0	0	0	1	8

Sheet 2	1	2	3	4	5	6	7	8	9	10	Final
(Pennsylvania) Emily Anderson	2	0	0	1	1	1	0	1	0	X	6
(Minnesota) Cory Christensen	0	4	2	0	0	0	2	0	2	X	10

Sheet 3	1	2	3	4	5	6	7	8	9	10	Final
(Minnesota) Jamie Sinclair	0	0	1	0	1	1	0	1	0	2	6
(Minnesota) Nina Roth	1	2	0	1	0	0	1	0	2	0	7

=== Draw 6 ===
Tuesday, February 9, 2:30 pm

Sheet 2	1	2	3	4	5	6	7	8	9	10	Final
(New York (state)) Joyance Meechai	0	0	0	1	0	1	0	X	X	X	2
(Minnesota) Jamie Sinclair	1	1	0	0	3	0	4	X	X	X	9

Sheet 3	1	2	3	4	5	6	7	8	9	10	Final
(New York (state)) Abigayle Lindgren	0	1	0	1	0	0	0	1	0	X	3
(Pennsylvania) Emily Anderson	0	0	3	0	2	0	2	0	0	X	7

Sheet 5	1	2	3	4	5	6	7	8	9	10	Final
(Minnesota) Nina Roth	1	0	1	0	1	0	0	2	0	X	5
(Wisconsin) Erika Brown	0	3	0	1	0	1	2	0	2	X	9

=== Draw 7 ===
Wednesday, February 10, 2:30 pm

Sheet 1	1	2	3	4	5	6	7	8	9	10	Final
(Pennsylvania) Emily Anderson	1	0	0	0	0	0	3	0	X	X	4
(New York (state)) Joyance Meechai	0	1	0	3	0	3	0	4	X	X	11

Sheet 3	1	2	3	4	5	6	7	8	9	10	Final
(Wisconsin) Erika Brown	2	0	1	1	0	1	2	1	X	X	8
(Minnesota) Cory Christensen	0	0	0	0	2	0	0	0	X	X	2

Sheet 4	1	2	3	4	5	6	7	8	9	10	Final
(Minnesota) Jamie Sinclair	2	0	1	0	0	4	1	0	1	X	9
(New York (state)) Abigayle Lindgren	0	1	0	0	2	0	0	1	0	X	4

== Playoffs ==
Page playoff system
1	(Minnesota) Nina Roth	4
2	(Wisconsin) Erika Brown	5
3	(Minnesota) Jamie Sinclair	5
4	(Minnesota) Cory Christensen	6

Semifinal
1	(Minnesota) Nina Roth	7
4	(Minnesota) Cory Christensen	5

Final
2	(Wisconsin) Erika Brown	8
1	(Minnesota) Nina Roth	6

=== 1 vs. 2 ===
Thursday, February 11, 4:00 pm

Team	1	2	3	4	5	6	7	8	9	10	Final
(Minnesota) Nina Roth	0	0	1	0	0	0	0	0	2	1	4
(Wisconsin) Erika Brown	1	0	0	1	0	1	1	1	0	0	5

Player percentages
(Minnesota) Team Roth		(Wisconsin) Team Brown	
Vicky Persinger	97%	Natalie Nicholson	93%
Aileen Sormunen	89%	Nicole Joraanstad	100%
Monica Walker	93%	Allison Pottinger	89%
Nina Roth	81%	Erika Brown	99%
Total	90%	Total	95%

=== 3 vs. 4 ===
Thursday, February 11, 4:00 pm

Team	1	2	3	4	5	6	7	8	9	10	Final
(Minnesota) Jamie Sinclair	0	1	0	0	2	0	0	0	2	0	5
(Minnesota) Cory Christensen	0	0	0	2	0	0	0	3	0	1	6

Player percentages
(Minnesota) Team Sinclair		(Minnesota) Team Christensen	
Jenna Haag	96%	Madison Bear	86%
Becca Hamilton	79%	Taylor Anderson	60%
Tabitha Peterson	80%	Sarah Anderson	86%
Jamie Sinclair	70%	Cory Christensen	83%
Total	81%	Total	79%

=== Semifinal ===
Friday, February 12, 11:00 am

Team	1	2	3	4	5	6	7	8	9	10	Final
(Minnesota) Nina Roth	0	2	0	1	0	1	1	0	1	1	7
(Minnesota) Cory Christensen	2	0	1	0	1	0	0	1	0	0	5

Player percentages
(Minnesota) Team Roth		(Minnesota) Team Christensen	
Vicky Persinger	87%	Madison Bear	83%
Aileen Sormunen	78%	Taylor Anderson	66%
Monica Walker	81%	Sarah Anderson	69%
Nina Roth	64%	Cory Christensen	68%
Total	77%	Total	71%

=== Final ===
Friday, February 12, 7:00 pm

Team	1	2	3	4	5	6	7	8	9	10	11	Final
(Wisconsin) Erika Brown	1	0	0	2	0	0	2	1	0	0	2	8
(Minnesota) Nina Roth	0	2	0	0	0	1	0	0	1	2	0	6

Player percentages
(Wisconsin) Team Brown		(Minnesota) Team Roth	
Natalie Nicholson	72%	Vicky Persinger	92%
Nicole Joraanstad	83%	Aileen Sormunen	77%
Allison Pottinger	82%	Monica Walker	81%
Erika Brown	83%	Nina Roth	74%
Total	80%	Total	81%

== Statistics ==
=== Perfect games ===
Player	Team	Position	Shots	Opponent
Jenna Haag	(Minnesota) Team Sinclair	Lead	14	(New York (state)) Team Meechai
Tabitha Peterson	(Minnesota) Team Sinclair	Third	18	(North Dakota) Team Lindgren
Nicole Joraanstad	(Wisconsin) Team Brown	Second	20	(Minnesota) Team Roth
