= Steve Gebauer =

American curler

- Curler ♂
- Born: November 20, 1981 (age 44); Mendota Heights, Minnesota, U.S.

Team
- Curling club: St. Paul Curling Club, Four Seasons Curling Club
- Mixed doubles partner: Joyance Meechai

Curling career
- Member Association: United States
- World Mixed Doubles Championship: 1 (2014)
Medal record
Curling
United States Mixed Doubles Championship
Gold medal – first place	2014 Medford

Steven Gebauer (born November 20, 1981) is an American curler.

At the national level, he is a 2014 United States mixed doubles curling champion.

== Teams and events ==
=== Men's ===
Season	Skip	Third	Second	Lead	Events
2012–13	Evan Jensen	Daniel Metcalf	Dan Ruehl	Steve Gebauer	

=== Mixed doubles ===
Season	Male	Female	Coach	Events
2013–14	Steve Gebauer	Joyance Meechai	Mary Gemmell	USMDCC 2014 (gold); WMDCC 2014 (19th)
2014–15	Steve Gebauer	Joyance Meechai		USMDCC 2015 (9th)

== Personal life ==
He started curling in 1996 at the age of 15.
