= Joyance Meechai =

American curler (born 1979)

- Curler ♀
- Born: February 2, 1979 (age 47); New York City, New York

Team
- Curling club: Ardsley Curling Club
- Mixed doubles partner: Steve Gebauer

Curling career
- Member Association: United States
- World Mixed Doubles Championship: 1 (2014)
Medal record
Curling
United States Mixed Doubles Championship
Gold medal – first place	2014 Medford

Joyance Meechai (born February 2, 1979) is an American curler.

At the national level, she is a 2014 United States mixed doubles curling champion.

== Teams and events ==
=== Women's ===
Season	Skip	Third	Second	Lead	Coach	Events
2012–13	Joyance Meechai	Casey Cucchiarelli	Jenn Cahak	Courtney Shaw		
2014–15	Joyance Meechai	Kimberly Rhyme	Carol Strojny	Katie Rhyme	Bill Rhyme	USWCC 2015 (10th)
2015–16	Joyance Meechai	Kimberly Rhyme	Rebecca Andrew	Katie Rhyme		USWCC 2016 (6th)

=== Mixed team ===
Season	Skip	Third	Second	Lead	Events
2011–12	Scott Edie	Joyance Meechai	Sean Murrey	Rebecca Baxter Erickson	USMxCC 2012 (7th)
2016–17	Darrick Kizlyk	Joyance Meechai	Justin Boshoven	Dena Rosenberry	USMxCC 2017 (8th)

=== Mixed doubles ===
Season	Male	Female	Coach	Events
2011–12	Mike Calcagno	Joyance Meechai		USMDCC 2012 (13th)
2013–14	Steve Gebauer	Joyance Meechai	Mary Gemmell	USMDCC 2014 (gold); WMDCC 2014 (19th)
2014–15	Steve Gebauer	Joyance Meechai		USMDCC 2015 (9th)

== Personal life ==
She started curling in 1999 at the age of 20.
