= 2015 United States Women's Curling Championship =

- Host city: Kalamazoo, Michigan
- Arena: Wings Stadium
- Dates: February 14–21
- Winner: (Wisconsin) Erika Brown
- Curling club: Madison CC, Madison, Wisconsin
- Skip: Erika Brown
- Third: Alex Carlson
- Second: Becca Funk
- Lead: Kendall Behm
- Finalist: (New York (state)) Patti Lank

The 2015 United States Women's Curling Championship was held from February 14 to 21 at the Wings Stadium in Kalamazoo, Michigan. It was held in conjunction with the 2015 United States Men's Curling Championship. The Aileen Sormunen rink will represent the United States at the 2015 World Women's Curling Championship in Sapporo, Japan.

== Teams ==
There will be ten teams participating in this year's national championship. The teams are listed as follows:

Skip	Third	Second	Lead	Alternate	Locale	Qualification method
Patti Lank	Maureen Stolt	Anna Bauman	Madisson Lank		(New York (state)) Lewiston, New York	High Performance Program committee selection
Cory Christensen	Sarah Anderson	Mackenzie Lank	Jenna Haag	Taylor Anderson	Blaine, Minnesota	High Performance Program committee selection
Aileen Sormunen	Tara Peterson	Vicky Persinger	Monica Walker		Blaine, Minnesota	Order of Merit
Nina Roth	Jamie Sinclair	Becca Hamilton	Tabitha Peterson		Blaine, Minnesota	Order of Merit
Erika Brown	Alex Carlson	Becca Funk	Kendall Behm		Madison, Wisconsin	Challenge Round
Debbie McCormick	Courtney George	Emilia Juocys	Stephanie Senneker		Rio, Wisconsin	Challenge Round
Jordan Moulton	Steph Bohan	Karlie Koenig	Sophie Brorson		St. Paul, Minnesota	Challenge Round
Kim Wapola	Brigid Knowles	Jennifer Westhagen	Kelsey Ostrowski		St. Paul, Minnesota	Challenge Round
Joyance Meechai	Kimberly Rhyme	Carol Strojny	Katie Rhyme		(New York (state)) Ardsley, New York	Challenge Round
Kate Bert	Steph Jensen	Emily Anderson	Sherri Schummer		St. Paul, Minnesota	Challenge Round

== Round robin standings ==
Final round robin standings

Key
Teams to playoffs

Skip	W	L	PF	PA	Ends won	Ends Lost	Blank ends	Stolen ends	Shot pct.
(Minnesota) Aileen Sormunen	8	1	66	35	42	27	12	15	80%
(Wisconsin) Erika Brown	8	1	73	37	41	28	6	20	80%
(Minnesota) Cory Christensen	8	1	71	45	42	32	11	17	81%
(New York (state)) Patti Lank	6	3	68	55	40	32	8	12	77%
(Minnesota) Nina Roth	4	5	63	59	35	41	9	10	80%
(Minnesota) Kate Bert	4	5	55	51	32	34	8	12	78%
(Wisconsin) Debbie McCormick	3	6	42	59	34	39	10	10	71%
(Minnesota) Jordan Moulton	2	7	41	67	29	41	10	9	71%
(New York (state)) Joyance Meechai	1	8	44	68	32	41	13	8	66%
(Minnesota) Kim Wapola	1	8	38	85	28	40	3	8	63%

== Round robin results ==
All draw times listed in Eastern Standard Time (UTC−5).

=== Draw 1 ===
Saturday, February 14, 4:30 pm

Sheet 1	1	2	3	4	5	6	7	8	9	10	Final
(New York (state)) Patti Lank	3	0	1	1	0	0	1	0	2	X	8
(Minnesota) Nina Roth	0	1	0	0	1	3	0	1	0	X	6

Sheet 2	1	2	3	4	5	6	7	8	9	10	11	Final
(Minnesota) Kate Bert	2	0	0	0	1	1	0	1	0	1	1	7
(New York (state)) Joyance Meechai	0	0	1	0	0	0	3	0	2	0	0	6

Sheet 3	1	2	3	4	5	6	7	8	9	10	Final
(Minnesota) Cory Christensen	0	2	0	1	0	0	1	0	2	0	6
(Minnesota) Aileen Sormunen	1	0	1	0	1	2	0	2	0	2	9

Sheet 4	1	2	3	4	5	6	7	8	9	10	Final
(Wisconsin) Erika Brown	0	1	0	3	1	1	0	0	2	X	8
(Wisconsin) Debbie McCormick	1	0	1	0	0	0	1	2	0	X	5

Sheet 5	1	2	3	4	5	6	7	8	9	10	Final
(Minnesota) Kim Wapola	1	0	2	0	4	0	0	1	2	X	10
(Minnesota) Jordan Moulton	0	2	0	1	0	1	2	0	0	X	6

=== Draw 2 ===
Sunday, February 15, 8:00 am

Sheet 1	1	2	3	4	5	6	7	8	9	10	Final
(Minnesota) Jordan Moulton	0	0	0	0	0	0	0	X	X	X	0
(Minnesota) Aileen Sormunen	1	1	0	0	2	1	1	X	X	X	6

Sheet 2	1	2	3	4	5	6	7	8	9	10	Final
(Minnesota) Kim Wapola	1	0	0	0	1	X	X	X	X	X	2
(Minnesota) Nina Roth	0	5	4	1	0	X	X	X	X	X	10

Sheet 3	1	2	3	4	5	6	7	8	9	10	11	Final
(Wisconsin) Debbie McCormick	0	0	4	0	0	2	0	0	0	1	1	8
(New York (state)) Joyance Meechai	1	1	0	0	1	0	2	1	1	0	0	7

Sheet 4	1	2	3	4	5	6	7	8	9	10	Final
(Minnesota) Cory Christensen	0	4	1	1	1	0	0	0	0	X	7
(Minnesota) Kate Bert	1	0	0	0	0	0	1	1	0	X	3

Sheet 5	1	2	3	4	5	6	7	8	9	10	Final
(Wisconsin) Erika Brown	3	0	4	0	3	0	0	2	X	X	12
(New York (state)) Patti Lank	0	2	0	1	0	2	1	0	X	X	6

=== Draw 3 ===
Sunday, February 15, 4:00 pm

Sheet 1	1	2	3	4	5	6	7	8	9	10	Final
(Minnesota) Cory Christensen	0	3	0	2	0	3	0	0	1	X	9
(New York (state)) Joyance Meechai	2	0	1	0	2	0	1	0	0	X	6

Sheet 2	1	2	3	4	5	6	7	8	9	10	Final
(Minnesota) Aileen Sormunen	1	0	0	0	3	0	0	1	0	0	5
(Wisconsin) Erika Brown	0	1	3	0	0	1	0	0	1	1	7

Sheet 3	1	2	3	4	5	6	7	8	9	10	Final
(Minnesota) Kate Bert	0	0	0	1	0	0	0	1	X	X	2
(Minnesota) Jordan Moulton	2	0	1	0	2	1	1	0	X	X	7

Sheet 4	1	2	3	4	5	6	7	8	9	10	Final
(Minnesota) Kim Wapola	2	0	0	1	0	0	1	0	0	X	4
(New York (state)) Patti Lank	0	2	2	0	0	1	0	3	1	X	9

Sheet 5	1	2	3	4	5	6	7	8	9	10	Final
(Wisconsin) Debbie McCormick	2	0	0	1	0	0	3	0	2	2	10
(Minnesota) Nina Roth	0	0	3	0	2	2	0	1	0	0	8

=== Draw 4 ===
Monday, February 16, 8:00 am

Sheet 1	1	2	3	4	5	6	7	8	9	10	Final
(Minnesota) Nina Roth	0	1	0	1	1	0	1	1	0	X	5
(Minnesota) Kate Bert	1	0	0	0	0	1	0	0	2	X	4

Sheet 2	1	2	3	4	5	6	7	8	9	10	Final
(New York (state)) Patti Lank	0	2	0	2	0	0	1	2	1	X	8
(Wisconsin) Debbie McCormick	0	0	1	0	0	1	0	0	0	X	2

Sheet 3	1	2	3	4	5	6	7	8	9	10	Final
(Minnesota) Kim Wapola	0	1	0	0	1	0	0	X	X	X	2
(Wisconsin) Erika Brown	3	0	2	1	0	3	3	X	X	X	12

Sheet 4	1	2	3	4	5	6	7	8	9	10	Final
(Minnesota) Aileen Sormunen	0	1	1	1	0	0	2	0	2	X	7
(New York (state)) Joyance Meechai	0	0	0	0	1	0	0	1	0	X	2

Sheet 5	1	2	3	4	5	6	7	8	9	10	11	Final
(Minnesota) Jordan Moulton	0	1	1	0	0	0	0	2	0	2	0	6
(Minnesota) Cory Christensen	0	0	0	2	1	1	1	0	1	0	1	7

=== Draw 5 ===
Monday, February 16, 4:00 pm

Sheet 1	1	2	3	4	5	6	7	8	9	10	Final
(Wisconsin) Debbie McCormick	1	0	0	1	0	0	0	2	0	0	4
(Minnesota) Cory Christensen	0	0	3	0	0	1	2	0	1	0	7

Sheet 2	1	2	3	4	5	6	7	8	9	10	Final
(Wisconsin) Erika Brown	2	0	0	1	1	1	0	3	X	X	8
(Minnesota) Kate Bert	0	1	1	0	0	0	1	0	X	X	3

Sheet 3	1	2	3	4	5	6	7	8	9	10	Final
(Minnesota) Aileen Sormunen	0	2	0	0	0	1	0	1	0	4	8
(New York (state)) Patti Lank	0	0	0	1	1	0	1	0	2	0	5

Sheet 4	1	2	3	4	5	6	7	8	9	10	Final
(Minnesota) Nina Roth	1	0	0	0	3	1	0	1	0	1	7
(Minnesota) Jordan Moulton	0	1	0	2	0	0	0	0	2	0	5

Sheet 5	1	2	3	4	5	6	7	8	9	10	11	Final
(New York (state)) Joyance Meechai	0	1	2	0	0	0	0	1	0	1	2	7
(Minnesota) Kim Wapola	0	0	0	2	1	1	0	0	1	0	0	5

=== Draw 6 ===
Tuesday, February 17, 10:00 am

Sheet 1	1	2	3	4	5	6	7	8	9	10	Final
(Minnesota) Aileen Sormunen	2	2	3	0	2	X	X	X	X	X	9
(Minnesota) Kim Wapola	0	0	0	1	0	X	X	X	X	X	1

Sheet 2	1	2	3	4	5	6	7	8	9	10	Final
(Minnesota) Jordan Moulton	0	0	1	0	2	0	0	1	0	X	4
(New York (state)) Patti Lank	0	5	0	2	0	1	1	0	1	X	10

Sheet 3	1	2	3	4	5	6	7	8	9	10	Final
(Minnesota) Nina Roth	0	1	0	0	0	2	0	0	2	0	5
(Minnesota) Cory Christensen	0	0	2	1	1	0	1	1	0	1	7

Sheet 4	1	2	3	4	5	6	7	8	9	10	Final
(New York (state)) Joyance Meechai	1	2	0	0	2	0	0	0	0	X	5
(Wisconsin) Erika Brown	0	0	1	3	0	2	0	1	1	X	8

Sheet 5	1	2	3	4	5	6	7	8	9	10	11	Final
(Minnesota) Kate Bert	0	1	2	0	0	0	0	1	0	1	1	6
(Wisconsin) Debbie McCormick	1	0	0	0	2	1	0	0	1	0	0	5

=== Draw 7 ===
Tuesday, February 17, 8:00 pm

Sheet 1	1	2	3	4	5	6	7	8	9	10	Final
(New York (state)) Joyance Meechai	0	1	1	0	1	0	0	2	0	X	5
(New York (state)) Patti Lank	2	0	0	3	0	2	0	0	1	X	8

Sheet 2	1	2	3	4	5	6	7	8	9	10	Final
(Minnesota) Nina Roth	0	1	0	0	1	0	0	2	0	X	4
(Minnesota) Aileen Sormunen	0	0	2	0	0	3	2	0	1	X	8

Sheet 3	1	2	3	4	5	6	7	8	9	10	Final
(Minnesota) Jordan Moulton	0	1	0	0	0	2	0	X	X	X	3
(Wisconsin) Debbie McCormick	0	0	3	3	1	0	4	X	X	X	11

Sheet 4	1	2	3	4	5	6	7	8	9	10	Final
(Minnesota) Kate Bert	2	2	0	1	1	1	0	2	X	X	9
(Minnesota) Kim Wapola	0	0	2	0	0	0	1	0	X	X	3

Sheet 5	1	2	3	4	5	6	7	8	9	10	Final
(Minnesota) Cory Christensen	0	0	0	1	1	2	0	2	0	1	7
(Wisconsin) Erika Brown	0	0	1	0	0	0	0	0	2	0	3

=== Draw 8 ===
Wednesday, February 18, 12:00 pm

Sheet 1	1	2	3	4	5	6	7	8	9	10	Final
(Wisconsin) Erika Brown	2	0	1	0	2	0	3	1	X	X	9
(Minnesota) Jordan Moulton	0	1	0	1	0	1	0	0	X	X	3

Sheet 2	1	2	3	4	5	6	7	8	9	10	Final
(Minnesota) Cory Christensen	0	2	3	0	2	0	0	0	4	X	11
(Minnesota) Kim Wapola	1	0	0	1	0	1	1	2	0	X	6

Sheet 3	1	2	3	4	5	6	7	8	9	10	Final
(New York (state)) Patti Lank	1	0	1	3	0	2	1	0	3	X	11
(Minnesota) Kate Bert	0	1	0	0	2	0	0	1	0	X	4

Sheet 4	1	2	3	4	5	6	7	8	9	10	11	Final
(Wisconsin) Debbie McCormick	1	0	1	0	1	0	0	2	1	0	0	6
(Minnesota) Aileen Sormunen	0	1	0	1	0	2	1	0	0	1	1	7

Sheet 5	1	2	3	4	5	6	7	8	9	10	Final
(Minnesota) Nina Roth	2	0	0	4	2	1	X	X	X	X	9
(New York (state)) Joyance Meechai	0	0	1	0	0	0	X	X	X	X	1

=== Draw 9 ===
Wednesday, February 18, 8:00 pm

Sheet 1	1	2	3	4	5	6	7	8	9	10	Final
(Minnesota) Kim Wapola	2	0	1	0	1	0	1	0	X	X	5
(Wisconsin) Debbie McCormick	0	3	0	5	0	2	0	2	X	X	12

Sheet 2	1	2	3	4	5	6	7	8	9	10	11	Final
(New York (state)) Joyance Meechai	1	0	0	0	1	0	2	0	1	0	0	5
(Minnesota) Jordan Moulton	0	0	0	1	0	1	0	2	0	1	2	7

Sheet 3	1	2	3	4	5	6	7	8	9	10	Final
(Wisconsin) Erika Brown	1	1	1	1	2	0	X	X	X	X	6
(Minnesota) Nina Roth	0	0	0	0	0	1	X	X	X	X	1

Sheet 4	1	2	3	4	5	6	7	8	9	10	Final
(New York (state)) Patti Lank	0	0	0	1	2	0	0	0	X	X	3
(Minnesota) Cory Christensen	0	2	2	0	0	2	1	3	X	X	10

Sheet 5	1	2	3	4	5	6	7	8	9	10	Final
(Minnesota) Aileen Sormunen	2	0	0	1	2	0	0	0	1	1	7
(Minnesota) Kate Bert	0	2	1	0	0	1	0	0	0	0	4

== Playoffs ==
Page playoff system
1	(Minnesota) Aileen Sormunen	3
2	(Wisconsin) Erika Brown	9
3	(Minnesota) Cory Christensen	4
4	(New York (state)) Patti Lank	10

Semifinal
1	(Minnesota) Aileen Sormunen	5
4	(New York (state)) Patti Lank	9

Final
2	(Wisconsin) Erika Brown	7
4	(New York (state)) Patti Lank	6

=== 1 vs. 2 ===
Thursday, February 19, 8:00 pm

Team	1	2	3	4	5	6	7	8	9	10	Final
(Minnesota) Aileen Sormunen	0	0	0	2	0	0	1	0	0	X	3
(Wisconsin) Erika Brown	2	1	2	0	1	1	0	1	1	X	9

Player percentages
(Minnesota) Team Sormunen		(Wisconsin) Team Brown	
Monica Walker	91%	Kendall Behm	68%
Vicky Persinger	80%	Becca Funk	81%
Tara Peterson	78%	Alexandra Carlson	77%
Aileen Sormunen	47%	Erika Brown	74%
Total	74%	Total	75%

=== 3 vs. 4 ===
Thursday, February 19, 8:00 pm

Team	1	2	3	4	5	6	7	8	9	10	Final
(Minnesota) Cory Christensen	0	2	0	1	0	1	0	0	X	X	4
(New York (state)) Patti Lank	1	0	2	0	2	0	4	1	X	X	10

Player percentages
(Minnesota) Team Christensen		(New York (state)) Team Lank	
Jenna Haag	84%	Madisson Lank	83%
Mackenzie Lank	72%	Anna Bauman	80%
Sarah Anderson	37%	Maureen Stolt	77%
Cory Christensen	58%	Patti Lank	87%
Total	63%	Total	81%

=== Semifinal ===
Friday, February 20, 4:00 pm

Team	1	2	3	4	5	6	7	8	9	10	Final
(Minnesota) Aileen Sormunen	0	1	0	2	0	0	0	2	0	X	5
(New York (state)) Patti Lank	0	0	3	0	0	1	3	0	2	X	9

Player percentages
(Minnesota) Team Sormunen		(New York (state)) Team Lank	
Vicky Persinger	77%	Madisson Lank	72%
Tara Peterson	79%	Anna Bauman	78%
Monica Walker	75%	Maureen Stolt	76%
Aileen Sormunen	58%	Patti Lank	90%
Total	73%	Total	79%

=== Final ===
Saturday, February 21, 10:00 am

Team	1	2	3	4	5	6	7	8	9	10	Final
(Wisconsin) Erika Brown	1	1	2	1	0	1	0	1	0	0	7
(New York (state)) Patti Lank	0	0	0	0	1	0	2	0	2	1	6

Player percentages
(Wisconsin) Team Brown		(New York (state)) Team Lank	
Kendall Behm	65%	Madisson Lank	86%
Becca Funk	51%	Anna Bauman	68%
Alexandra Carlson	88%	Maureen Stolt	76%
Erika Brown	73%	Patti Lank	69%
Total	70%	Total	75%

== Statistics ==
=== Perfect games ===
Player	Team	Position	Shots	Opponent
Cory Christensen	(Minnesota) Team Christensen	Skip	20	(Wisconsin) Team McCormick
