= Monica Walker =

American curler (born 1987)

- Curler
- Born: February 20, 1987 (age 39); Concord, Massachusetts, U.S.

Team
- Curling club: St. Paul & Four Seasons
- Mixed doubles partner: Alex Leichter

Curling career
- World Championship: 3 (2015, 2018, 2019)
- Grand Slam victories: 1 (2018 Players' Championship)
Medal record
Curling
Representing Minnesota
United States Women's Curling Championship
Gold medal – first place	2017 Everett
Gold medal – first place	2018 Fargo
Gold medal – first place	2019 Kalamazoo
Silver medal – second place	2016 Jacksonville
Silver medal – second place	2021 Wausau
Bronze medal – third place	2015 Kalamazoo
United States Olympic Curling Trials
Silver medal – second place	2017 Omaha

Monica Walker (born February 20, 1987) is an American curler originally from Brighton, Massachusetts. She is a three-time national champion.

== Curling career ==
Walker began curling in 1997. In adult competitions, she placed 4th at the U.S. National Championships in 2012 and again in 2013.

In 2016 Walker and Persinger left Roth's team to join Jamie Sinclair as the front end of a new team, with Alex Carlson as third. This new team found success, winning the 2017 U.S. Championships, but missed out on going to the World Championship due to not having enough points on the World Curling Tour. Walker and Team Sinclair competed for the winning Team North America at the 2017 Continental Cup of Curling. The team played in one Grand Slam, the 2017 Humpty's Champions Cup (qualifying as US champions), where they made it all the way to the quarterfinals.

The team started the 2017–18 season by winning the AMJ Campbell Shorty Jenkins Classic. They lost in the finals of the 2017 United States Olympic Curling Trials, missing out on the chance to play in the Olympics. Later that season they would win the 2018 United States Women's Curling Championship and would represent the United States at the 2018 Ford World Women's Curling Championship, where they finished fourth. Team Sinclair made history at the 2018 Players' Championship when they became the first American team to win a Grand Slam event. To finish the season they had a quarterfinal finish at the 2018 Humpty's Champions Cup.

The United States Curling Association would change the high performance teams the following season, for the next Olympic quadrennial. Walker remained at lead for skip Sinclair, with twin sisters Sarah and Taylor Anderson playing third and second respectively. The team did not have a very successful season, up until the 2019 United States Women's Curling Championship where they earned a third national title in a row, defeating Team Roth in the final. At the 2019 World Women's Curling Championship the team went 6–6 finishing in seventh place, just missing the playoffs. At the end of the season Walker announced she would be retiring from competitive curling.

Walker's retirement from competitive women's curling only lasted one season, as during the 2020 off-season Sinclair formed a new team, bringing Walker out of her short retirement to play at third, and adding two younger curlers for the front end, Cora Farrell and Elizabeth Cousins. The team was not able to compete in any tour events due to the COVID-19 pandemic, but they were able to play in the 2021 United States Women's Curling Championship, held May 26–30 in Wausau, Wisconsin. There, they topped the round robin with an undefeated 6–0 record, which qualified them directly to the championship final where they faced Team Cory Christensen. After trailing early, Team Sinclair tied the game in the eighth end, but couldn't hold on for the win as Christensen scored two points in the extra end to win 8–6.

The following season, Team Sinclair began by winning the 2021 Oakville Fall Classic, defeating Suzanne Birt 8–6 in the final game. Later in the season, they won another tour event at the Atkins Curling Supplies Classic with a 10–4 win over Kristy Watling in the championship final. They reached the final of the US Open of Curling, losing to the Tabitha Peterson rink 8–5 in the final. They also had a semifinal finish at the 2021 Curlers Corner Autumn Gold Curling Classic and a quarterfinal finish at the 2021 Oakville Labour Day Classic. Team Sinclair then played in the 2021 United States Olympic Curling Trials, held November 12 to 21 at the Baxter Arena in Omaha, Nebraska. Despite entering the Trials as the second ranked team, the team did not have a good performance, failing to reach the playoff round with a 4–6 record, finishing third. Team Sinclair ended the 2021–22 season with a semifinal loss at the Curl Mesabi Classic. They disbanded following the season.

== Personal life ==
Walker is a native of the Boston area. She is the daughter of two Scottish parents - Phil and Hilary Walker and has 2 younger sisters - Jillian and Emily. Monica is a huge Boston Bruins fan and enjoys playing soccer in her free time. She attended Boston University for her undergrad and completed a study abroad at the University of Edinburgh. Walker attended the Simmons School of Management for an MBA and works in Quality Control in the Pharmaceutical industry. She lives in Brighton, MA and curls with Broomstones Curling Club

== Teams ==
=== Women's ===
Season	Skip	Third	Second	Lead	Alternate	Coach	Events
2003–04	Monica Walker	Laura Hallisey	Jillian Walker	Juliana Sheldon	Nikki Rossetti	Russell Hallisey	
2004–05	Monica Walker	Laura Hallisey	Jillian Walker	Juliana Sheldon	Nikki Rossetti	Karyn Cousins	2005 USJCC (5th)
2005–06	Monica Walker	Laura Hallisey	Jillian Walker	Nikki Rossetti			2006 USJCC (silver)
2006–07	Monica Walker	Laura Hallisey	Jillian Walker	Nikki Rossetti			2007 USJCC (silver)
2006–07	Aileen Sormunen	Courtney George	Molly Bonner	Jordan Moulton	Monica Walker	Robert Fenson	2007 WJCC (4th)
2007–08	Monica Walker	Laura Hallisey	Nikki Rossetti	Jillian Walker		Karyn Cousins	2008 USJCC (4th)
2009–10	Monica Walker	Elizabeth Williams	Ashley Lawreck	Rachel Ryan			2010 USWCC (5th)
2010–11	Chrissy Haase	Monica Walker	Karen Walker	Nicole Vassar			2011 USWCC (9th)
2011–12	Alex Carlson	Monica Walker	Kendall Moulton-Behm	Jordan Moulton			2012 USWCC (4th)
2012–13	Alex Carlson	Monica Walker	Kendall Moulton-Behm	Jordan Moulton			2013 USWCC (4th)
2013–14	Courtney George	Aileen Sormunen	Amanda McLean	Monica Walker	Jordan Moulton		2013 USOCT (4th); 2014 USWCC (4th)
2014–15	Aileen Sormunen	Tara Peterson	Vicky Persinger	Monica Walker			2015 USWCC (bronze)
2014–15	Aileen Sormunen	Monica Walker	Tara Peterson	Vicky Persinger	Becca Hamilton	Scott Baird	2015 WWCC (10th)
2015–16	Nina Roth	Monica Walker	Aileen Sormunen	Vicky Persinger			2016 USWCC (silver)
2016–17	Jamie Sinclair	Alex Carlson	Vicky Persinger	Monica Walker			2017 USOCT (silver); 2017 USWCC (gold)
2017–18	Jamie Sinclair	Alex Carlson	Vicky Persinger	Monica Walker	Jenna Martin (WWCC)	Scott Baird	2018 USWCC (gold); 2018 WWCC (4th)
2018–19	Jamie Sinclair	Sarah Anderson	Taylor Anderson	Monica Walker	Vicky Persinger (WWCC)	Bryan Cochrane	2019 USWCC (gold); 2019 WWCC (7th)
2020–21	Jamie Sinclair	Monica Walker	Cora Farrell	Elizabeth Cousins		Mark Lazar	2021 USWCC (silver)
2021–22	Jamie Sinclair	Monica Walker	Cora Farrell	Elizabeth Cousins			

=== Mixed doubles ===
Season	Female	Male	Events
2015–16	Monica Walker	Sean Beighton	2016 USMDCC (DNQ)
2016–17	Monica Walker	Jason Smith	2017 USMDCC (DNQ)
2017–18	Monica Walker	Jason Smith	2017 USMDCOT (5th)
2018–19	Monica Walker	Alex Leichter	2019 USMDCC (DNQ)
2019–20	Monica Walker	Alex Leichter	2020 USMDCC (4th)
2020–21	Monica Walker	Alex Leichter	2021 USMDCC (5th)
2021–22	Monica Walker	Andrew Stopera	
