= Vicky Persinger =

American curler

- Curler
- Other names: Victoria Persinger
- Born: June 1, 1992 (age 34); Fairbanks, Alaska, U.S.
- Height: 5 ft 8 in (173 cm)

Team
- Curling club: Fairbanks CC, Fairbanks, AK

Curling career
- Member Association: United States
- World Championship: 7 (2015, 2018, 2019, 2022, 2023, 2024, 2025)
- Pan Continental Championship: 3 (2022, 2023, 2024)
- Olympic: 1 (2022)
- Other appearances: World Junior Championships: 1 (2013)
Medal record
Women's curling
Representing United States
Pan Continental Championships
Bronze medal – third place	2023 Kelowna
United States Olympic Curling Trials
Silver medal – second place	2017 Omaha
Silver medal – second place	2021 Omaha
United States Women's Championship
Gold medal – first place	2017 Everett
Gold medal – first place	2018 Fargo
Gold medal – first place	2021 Wausau
Gold medal – first place	2025 Duluth
Silver medal – second place	2016 Jacksonville
Silver medal – second place	2020 Cheney
Bronze medal – third place	2015 Kalamazoo
Bronze medal – third place	2019 Kalamazoo
United States Mixed Doubles Olympic Trials
Gold medal – first place	2021 Eveleth
Bronze medal – third place	2017 Blaine
United States Mixed Doubles Championship
Gold medal – first place	2021 Wausau
Silver medal – second place	2019 Seattle
Bronze medal – third place	2023 Kalamazoo

Victoria "Vicky" Persinger (born June 1, 1992) is an American curler from Fairbanks, Alaska. She is a three-time United States Women's National Champion.

== Career ==
Persinger competed in eight United States Junior Championships, winning gold at her last appearance in 2013. As national champions, they represented the United States at the 2012 World Junior Championships in Östersund, Sweden, where they finished in seventh place with a 4–5 record.

Since aging out of juniors, Persinger has medalled at every Women's National Championship she has competed in, six in a row as of 2020. At her first Women's Nationals in 2015, she played lead for skip Aileen Sormunen, they were the number one seed in the page playoffs but lost to Erika Brown in the 1 vs 2 game and to Patti Lank in the semifinals to finish with the bronze medal. Despite their third-place finish, Team Sormunen still earned the opportunity to represent the United States at the 2015 World Women's Championship because, of the top three teams at Nationals, they earned the most Order of Merit points throughout the season. They finished in tenth place with a 3–8 record.

At the 2016 Nationals, Persinger won silver with skip Nina Roth, losing the final to Erika Brown. The next season Persinger joined Jamie Sinclair's new team at second, along with third Alex Carlson and lead Monica Walker. Team Sinclair found success, winning the 2017 National Championship, but missed out on going to the World Championship due to Roth earning more points throughout the season. They also played on the winning North American Team at the 2017 Continental Cup of Curling and made it to the quarterfinals of the last Grand Slam of the season, the 2017 Humpty's Champions Cup.

The team started the 2017–18 season by winning the AMJ Campbell Shorty Jenkins Classic, a WCT event. At the 2017 United States Olympic Curling Trials, they missed their chance to play in the 2018 Winter Olympics when they lost a close three game final series to Nina Roth's team. Later that season they defended their national title, winning the 2018 United States Women's Curling Championship. Representing the United States at the 2018 World Women's Championship, they finished fourth, losing the bronze medal game to Russia's Victoria Moiseeva. Persinger and Team Sinclair made history at the 2018 Players' Championship when they became the first American team to win a Grand Slam event. They finished the season with another quarterfinal finish at the 2018 Humpty's Champions Cup.

For the 2018–19 season, Persinger moved to playing third on Cory Christensen's team, which also included Madison Bear at lead and Jenna Martin at second. The team's coach was Canadian Darah Blandford, in her first year with the USCA High Performance Program. Team Christensen was chosen to represent the United States at the third leg of the Curling World Cup in Jönköping, Sweden; the Curling World Cup was a four-part international tournament held around the world throughout the curling season. There they finished with a 3–3 record.

At the 2019 United States Women's Championship, Persinger and Team Christensen finished the round-robin with a record of 5–2, good enough for the third seed in the page playoffs. In the 3 vs. 4 playoff game, they defeated Stephanie Senneker's team by one point, 9–8. The semifinal match against Nina Roth's team came down to the last stone, but Roth came through with the win, resulting in Persinger's second bronze medal. Persinger temporarily rejoined Sinclair's team, as alternate, for the 2019 World Championship where the team went 6–6, finishing in seventh place.

Shortly after the season, however, it was announced that Christensen's team was dissolving; Martin decided to step away from competitive curling, Bear became skip of her own team, and Christensen and Persinger joined Sinclair's team. So after one season away Persinger was back at second on Team Sinclair, now with Christensen at third, Taylor Anderson at lead, Sarah Anderson as alternate, and Cathy Overton-Clapham as coach. On the WCT the team won the Red Deer Curling Classic and followed it a couple of weeks later by making it to the quarterfinals at the Curl Mesabi Classic, where they lost to Tabitha Peterson's team.

At the 2020 United States Women's Championship, Persinger and Team Sinclair only lost one game in the round-robin, earning the number one seed in the playoffs. In the 1 vs. 2 page playoff, they lost to Tabitha Peterson's team, who they faced again in the final after defeating Ariel Traxler's junior team in the semifinals. Peterson defeated Team Sinclair a second time in the final, with a final score of 7–5, resulting in Persinger's second Women's Nationals silver medal.

== Personal life ==
Persinger started curling in 1997 when she was five years old.

Persinger's cousin Greg is also an accomplished curler, having won the United States Men's Championship twice. Her sister Tina and cousin Chad are also curlers. All four played together and finished in fourth place at the 2015 United States Mixed Curling Championship.

She graduated from University of Alaska Anchorage. She currently works as a contract specialist.

== Teams ==
=== Women's ===
Season	Skip	Third	Second	Lead	Alternate	Coach	Events
2005–06	Kaye Hufman	Lacy Birklid	Vicky Persinger	Paige Sinicrope			2006 USJCC (7th)
2006–07	Kaye Hufman	Lacy Birklid	Vicky Persinger	Tina Persinger			2007 USJCC (4th)
2007–08	Kaye Hufman	Lacy Birklid	Vicky Persinger	Tina Persinger	Katy Sharpe		2008 USJCC (5th)
2008–09	Kaye Hufman	Vicky Persinger	Tina Persinger	Tressa Shuttleworth			2009 USJCC (7th)
2009–10	Vicky Persinger	Jennifer Taylor	Tina Persinger	Meredith Hazen	Christa Czajka		2010 USJCC (5th)
2010–11	Vicky Persinger	Tina Persinger	Meredith Hazen	Kaitlin Fowler			2011 USJCC (6th)
2011–12	Vicky Persinger	Tina Persinger	Kaitlin Fowler	Becky Hill			2012 USJCC (6th)
2012–13	Miranda Solem	Vicky Persinger	Karlie Koenig	Chelsea Solem	Cory Christensen (WJCC)	Mike Solem	2013 USJCC (gold); 2013 WJCC (7th)
2014–15	Aileen Sormunen	Monica Walker	Tara Peterson	Vicky Persinger	Becca Hamilton (WWCC)	Scott Baird	2015 USWCC (bronze); 2015 WWCC (10th)
2015–16	Nina Roth	Monica Walker	Aileen Sormunen	Vicky Persinger			2016 USWCC (silver)
2016–17	Jamie Sinclair	Alexandra Carlson	Vicky Persinger	Monica Walker	Tara Peterson (USWCC)		2017 Cont. Cup (gold); 2017 USWCC (gold)
2017–18	Jamie Sinclair	Alexandra Carlson	Vicky Persinger	Monica Walker	Jenna Martin (WCC)	Scott Baird	2017 USOCT (silver); 2018 USWCC (gold); 2018 WCC (4th)
2018–19	Cory Christensen	Vicky Persinger	Jenna Martin	Madison Bear	Linda Christensen (USWCC)	Pete Fenson	CWC/3 (5th); 2019 USWCC (bronze)
2018–19	Jamie Sinclair	Sarah Anderson	Taylor Anderson	Monica Walker	Vicky Persinger	Bryan Cochrane, Pete Fenson	2019 WWCC 2019 (7th)
2019–20	Jamie Sinclair	Cory Christensen	Vicky Persinger	Taylor Anderson	Sarah Anderson	Cathy Overton-Clapham	2020 USWCC (silver)
2020–21	Cory Christensen	Sarah Anderson	Vicky Persinger	Taylor Anderson		Cathy Overton-Clapham	2021 USWCC (gold)
2021–22	Cory Christensen	Sarah Anderson	Vicky Persinger	Taylor Anderson		Cathy Overton-Clapham	2021 USOCT (silver); 2022 WWCC (5th)
2022–23	Tabitha Peterson	Cory Thiesse	Becca Hamilton	Tara Peterson	Vicky Persinger	Cathy Overton-Clapham	2022 PCCC (4th); 2023 WWCC (7th)
2023–24	Tabitha Peterson	Cory Thiesse	Tara Peterson	Becca Hamilton	Vicky Persinger	Cathy Overton-Clapham	2023 PCCC (bronze); 2024 WWCC (7th)
2024–25	Tabitha Peterson	Cory Thiesse	Tara Peterson	Taylor Anderson-Heide	Vicky Persinger	Cathy Overton-Clapham	2025 USWCC (gold); 2025 WWCC (12th)
2024–25	Cory Thiesse	Vicky Persinger	Tara Peterson	Taylor Anderson-Heide	Aileen Geving	Cathy Overton-Clapham	2024 PCCC (5th)

=== Mixed ===
Season	Skip	Third	Second	Lead	Events
2015	Greg Persinger	Vicky Persinger	Chad Persinger	Tina Persinger	2015 USMxCC (4th)
2016	Greg Persinger	Vicky Persinger	Quinn Evenson	Catharine Persinger	2016 USMxCC (silver)

=== Mixed doubles ===
Season	Female	Male	Events
2016–17	Vicky Persinger	Quinn Evenson	
2016–17	Vicky Persinger	Jared Zezel	2017 USMDCC (5th)
2017–18	Vicky Persinger	Jared Zezel	2017 USMDOT (bronze)
2018–19	Vicky Persinger	Chris Plys	2019 USMDCC (silver)
2019–20	Vicky Persinger	Chris Plys	2020 USMDCC (5th)
2020–21	Vicky Persinger	Chris Plys	2021 USMDCC (gold)
2021–22	Vicky Persinger	Chris Plys	2021 USMDOT (gold); 2022 OG (8th)
2022–23	Vicky Persinger	Chris Plys	2023 USMDCC (bronze)
2023–24	Vicky Persinger	Daniel Casper	2024 USMDCC (6th)
2024–25	Vicky Persinger	Daniel Casper	
