= Colorado Curling Cup =

World Curling Tour event

- Established: 2019
- Host city: Lafayette, Colorado
- Arena: Rock Creek Curling
- Purse: $16,000
- 2026 champion: (Australia) Wytrychowski / Hewitt

The Colorado Curling Cup is an annual mixed doubles curling tournament. It is held annually in the Fall at Rock Creek Curling in Lafayette, Colorado and the Denver Curling Center in Golden, Colorado.

The 2023 event acted as a qualifier for the 2024 United States Mixed Doubles Curling Championship. While the 2024 event acted as a qualifier for the 2025 United States Olympic mixed doubles curling trials.

The event features a World Tour event, a wheelchair event and a club-level event for recreational curlers.

The purse for the event is US$16,000, and its event categorization is 750 (highest calibre is 1000).

The event has been held since 2019, and was part of the World Curling Tour from 2023 to 2025.

== Past champions ==
Year	Winning pair	Runner up pair	Third place pair	Fourth place pair	Purse ($US)
2019	(United States) Sarah Anderson / Korey Dropkin	(Canada) Kira Brunton / John Morris	(United States) Christine McMakin / Riley Fenson & (Scotland) Jayne Stirling / Fraser Kingan		$15,000
2020	Cancelled				
2022	(United States) Cora Farrell / Coleman Thurston	(United States) Delaney Strouse / Daniel Casper	(United States) Sarah Anderson / Andrew Stopera & (United States) Aileen Geving / John Shuster		$12,000
2023	(United States) Sarah Anderson / Andrew Stopera	(United States) Clare Moores / Lance Wheeler	(United States) Kim Rhyme / Jason Smith	(United States) Vicky Persinger / Daniel Casper	$12,000
2024	(United States) Cory Thiesse / Korey Dropkin	(Canada) Nancy Martin / Steve Laycock	(United States) Sarah Anderson / Andrew Stopera & (United States) Rebecca Hamilton / Matt Hamilton		$16,000
2025	(Canada) Nancy Martin / Steve Laycock	(Australia) Tahli Gill / Dean Hewitt	(United States) Bella Hagenbuch / Daniel Laufer & (United States) Clare Moores / Lance Wheeler		$16,000
2026	(Australia) Jessica Wytrychowski / Dean Hewitt	(United States) Madison Bear / Aidan Oldenburg	(Canada) Katie Ford / Oliver Campbell & (United States) Stephanie Senneker / Nicholas Visnich		$16,000
