= Cory Thiesse =

American curler (born 1994)

- Curler
- Born: December 1, 1994 (age 31); Duluth, Minnesota, U.S.

Team
- Curling club: Duluth CC, Duluth, MN
- Mixed doubles partner: Korey Dropkin

Curling career
- Member Association: United States
- World Championship: 5 (2017, 2022, 2023, 2024, 2025)
- World Mixed Doubles Championship: 4 (2019, 2023, 2025, 2027)
- Pan Continental Championship: 4 (2022, 2023, 2024, 2025)
- Olympic: 2 (2018, 2026)
Medal record
Representing United States
Olympic Games
Silver medal – second place	2026 Milano Cortina	Mixed doubles
World Mixed Doubles Championships
Gold medal – first place	2023 Gangneung
Bronze medal – third place	2019 Stavanger
Pan Continental Championships
Bronze medal – third place	2023 Kelowna
World Junior Curling Championships
Silver medal – second place	2016 Copenhagen
Representing Minnesota
United States Olympic Curling Trials
Gold medal – first place	2025 Sioux Falls	Women's
Gold medal – first place	2025 Lafayette	Mixed doubles
Silver medal – second place	2017 Blaine	Mixed doubles
Silver medal – second place	2021 Omaha	Women's
Bronze medal – third place	2017 Omaha	Women's
US Women's National Championships
Gold medal – first place	2021 Wausau
Gold medal – first place	2023 Denver
Gold medal – first place	2024 East Rutherford
Gold medal – first place	2025 Duluth
Silver medal – second place	2018 Fargo
Silver medal – second place	2020 Cheney
Bronze medal – third place	2019 Kalamazoo
Bronze medal – third place	2016 Jacksonville
US Mixed Doubles Championship
Gold medal – first place	2019 Seattle
Gold medal – first place	2023 Kalamazoo
Silver medal – second place	2020 Bemidji
Silver medal – second place	2024 Traverse City

Cory Thiesse (/ˈtiːsiː/ TEE-see; née Christensen; born December 1, 1994) is an American curler from Duluth, Minnesota. At the 2026 Olympics, she and Korey Dropkin became the first American team to win a medal in Olympic mixed doubles curling, winning the silver medal and making her the first American woman to win any Olympic medal in curling.

She is a four-time U.S. women's champion, winning titles in 2021, 2023, 2024 and 2025. Thiesse was one of the top junior women's curlers in the United States, playing in six national junior championships and winning four of them. She was the alternate on Nina Roth's 2018 United States Olympic team.

Thiesse is a former world mixed doubles champion, winning the title in 2023 alongside partner Korey Dropkin. She also won a bronze medal at the event in 2019 with partner John Shuster.

== Career ==
=== Women's ===
==== 2010–2013: Early juniors ====
Thiesse's first appearance on the national stage was at the 2011 United States Junior National Championships, where she finished fifth. Out of her six Junior National appearances, that would be the only time she did not play in the championship final. At the 2012 Junior Championships Thiesse returned with the same team of third Elizabeth Busche, second Anna Bauman and lead Sonja Bauman. Thiesse skipped her team to victory, earning her first national title and her first opportunity to represent the United States at the World Junior Championships. At the 2012 World Juniors in Ostersund, Sweden, Thiesse's team finished with a 0–9 record. Just weeks after competing at the World Championship, Thiesse's vice-skip Busche died from cancer. Buche's sudden, young death hit Thiesse and the rest of the Duluth junior curlers hard.

The next season, Thiesse returned to competition with the Bauman sisters remaining on the front end of the team and Rebecca Funk replacing Busche at third. The team started the season off strong, winning the Minnesota Junior Women's State Championship. At the 2013 Junior Nationals, Thiesse finished the round-robin as the number one seed with a 8–1 record, but ultimately won only the silver medal when they lost the final to Miranda Solem's team by a single point. Thiesse would still get to play at the 2013 World Junior Championships though, as Solem asked her to join as their alternate. Thiesse would play in four games at the World Juniors as they finished in seventh place with a 4–5 record.

After Thiesse returned from the World Championship, she rejoined her Junior Nationals team, plus Mackenzie Lank as alternate, for one more event at the end of the season, the qualifier to represent the United States at the 2013 Winter Universiade. The University Games Qualifier had five of the top Junior Women's teams and six of the top Junior Men's teams in the country competing. Tied after the round-robin, Thiesse defeated Becca Hamilton's team in a tiebreaker to earn their trip to the Winter Universiade next season.

==== 2013–2016: Junior High Performance Program ====
Over the 2013 off-season, it was announced that the Christensen team was joining the United States Curling Association's (USCA) Project 2018 Program, to which they were invited due to winning the University Games Qualifier at the end of the previous season. The Project 2018 Program was a part of the USCA High Performance Program intended to nurture junior curlers, with success at the 2018 Winter Olympics as the goal.

Thiesse, Funk, and the Bauman sisters started the 2013–14 season off playing in a series of World Curling Tour (WCT) bonspiels as a lead up to the 2013 Winter Universiade. They only won one game in each of the Fort Wayne Summer Cash Spiel, the St. Paul Cash Spiel, and the Molson Cash Spiel but won the 2013 FSCC Early Cash bonspiel in Blaine, Minnesota, their first WCT win. At the Winter Universiade, held in Trentino, Italy, Sonja Bauman and Mackenzie Lank swapped positions, with Lank taking over at lead. The team missed the playoffs, finished the round-robin in eighth place with a 3–6 record.

The USCA's High Performance Advisory Group picked Thiesse's team and Korey Dropkin's team (the American boys' team at the Winter Universiade) to automatically earn berths at the 2014 United States Junior Nationals so they did not need to worry about play-downs, which were held very close in time to the Winter Universiade. Thiesse's team had a slightly tweaked line-up for Junior Nationals, with MacKenzie Lank at third, Anna Bauman still at second, Anna Hopkins joining the team at lead, and Sonja Bauman remaining as alternate. With a win over Sarah Anderson's team in the final, Thiesse earned her second Junior Nationals title. At the 2014 World Junior Championship Thiesse missed the playoffs, finishing in 6th place with a 5–4 record.

After the 2013–14 season, the USCA revamped their High Performance Program from team-based to individual-based; curlers would be invited into the program as individuals and then assigned teammates. Thiesse was selected as the skip of the junior women's team, to play with Sarah Anderson at third, MacKenzie Lank at second, Jenna Haag at lead, and Sarah's twin sister Taylor Anderson as alternate. The new Team Thiesse won the 2014 Molson Cash Spiel, a WCT event, defeating Canadian Kendra Lilly in the final. They then won the 2015 Junior National Championship, defeating Madison Bear's team 10–6 in nine ends in the final. A month later Thiesse made her first non-junior national appearance when her team competed at the 2015 United States Women's Championship. They finished the round-robin with a 8–1 record but lost in the 3 vs 4 page playoff game to Patti Lank, MacKenzie's mother and a five-time United States champion. At the 2015 World Juniors Christensen finished the round-robin with a 5–4 record, the same as in 2014, but this time it was good enough to tie Lisa Gisler's Switzerland team for the last playoffs berth. Christensen lost the tiebreaker game to Gisler, who would go on to win the bronze medal.

Coming into the 2015–16 season, Thiesse's team again had line-up changes since MacKenzie Lank was no longer part of the USCA High Performance Program and Jenna Haag had graduated from juniors to women's. Sarah Anderson kept her spot at third, Taylor Anderson moved to second, Madison Bear joined the team at lead, and Christine McMakin joined as alternate. They again won a WCT event early in the season, going undefeated at the 2015 St. Paul Cash Spiel. At the 2016 Junior National Championship the team finished with a perfect 11–0 record, never even needing to play a full ten end game. This was Thiesse's third Junior title in a row and fourth overall, the second most for a women's skip after Erika Brown's five titles. It was also Thiesse and the Anderson twins' last Junior Nationals due to ageing out of juniors after this season. Winning Junior Nationals earned Team Christensen a spot at the Women's National Championship in Jacksonville, Florida, where they earned the fourth seed in the playoffs with a 3–3 round-robin record. They defeated Jamie Sinclair in the 3 vs 4 page playoff game but then lost to Nina Roth in the semifinals, earning the bronze medal.

At Thiesse's final World Junior Championship, she found her greatest success, finishing the round-robin with a 7–2 record, good enough for the second seed in the page playoff system. In the 1 vs 2 playoff game, Thiesse defeated the number one seed, Canada, skipped by Mary Fay. This gave the United States a path straight to the final where they ultimately faced Canada again, this time losing 4–7 to earn the silver medal.

==== 2016–2019: Graduation to women's play ====
No longer in juniors, Thiesse and the Anderson twins were reunited with their former teammate Jenna Haag, who had aged out of juniors a year before them, for the 2016–17 season. Thiesse returned to the St. Paul Cash Spiel and successfully defended her previous year's title, only losing one game throughout the tournament. At the 2017 United States Women's Championship Team Christensen missed the playoffs, finishing with a 4–3 record. Despite falling short at Nationals, Thiesse still got to compete at the 2017 World Women's Championship when Nina Roth's team added her as their alternate. At Worlds they finished in fifth place.

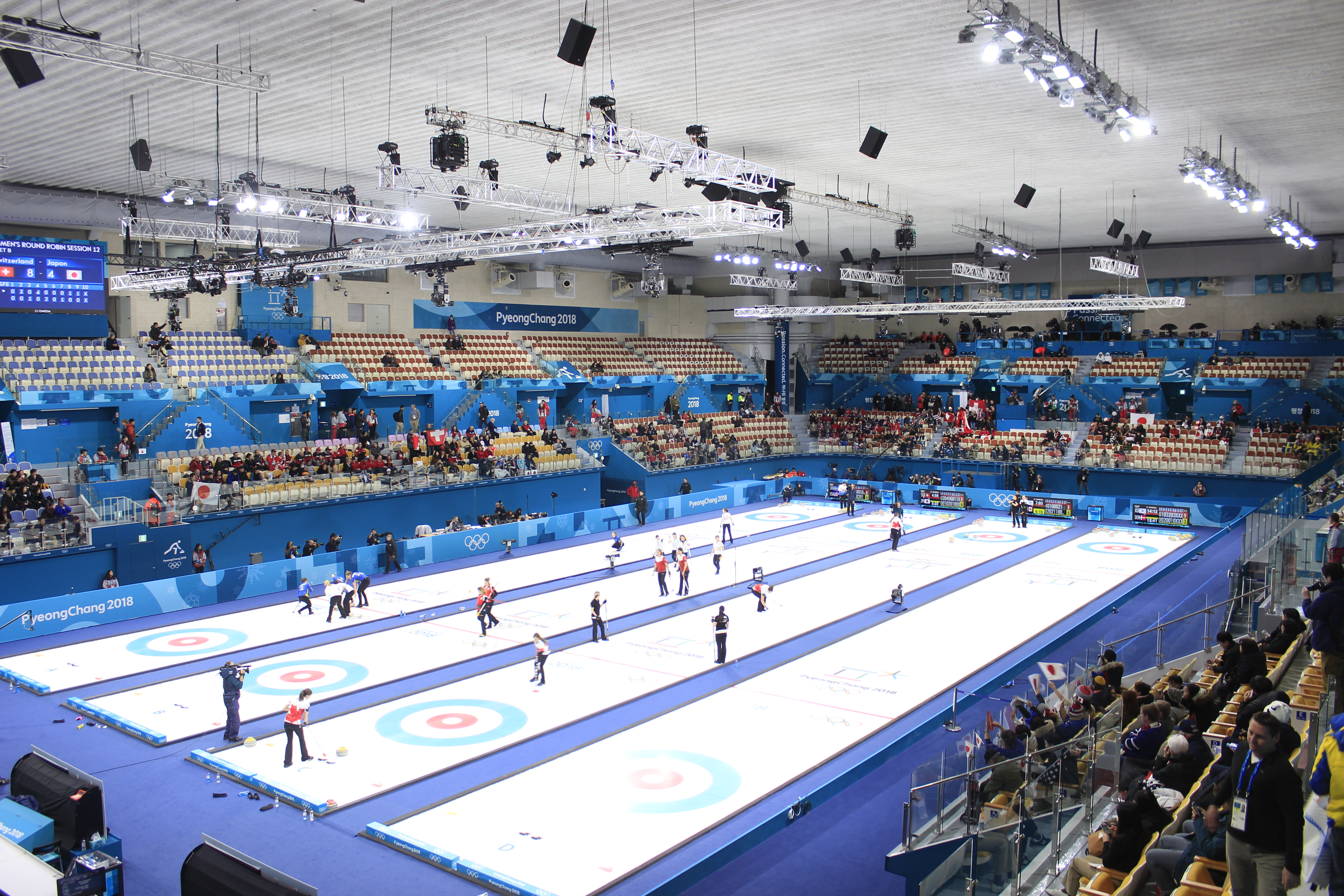
Gangneung Curling Centre, curling venue for the 2018 Winter Olympics

Team Christensen maintained their line-up for the 2017–18 season, with the exception of Phill Drobnick replacing Ann Swisshelm as coach. They were one of only three women's teams competing at the 2017 United States Olympic Curling Trials, attempting to earn the chance to represent the United States at the 2018 Winter Olympics. At the Trials Team Christensen only won one game and Nina Roth's team ultimately became the Olympic team, but Thiesse was again asked to be the alternate for Team Roth (the same position she filled at the 2017 World Championship). At the Olympics the team missed the playoffs, finishing eighth with a record of 4–5.

Only a week after the women's curling wrapped up at the Olympics Thiesse was at the 2018 United States Women's Championship with her usual team of Sarah Anderson, Taylor Anderson, and Jenna Martin (née Haag). Team Christensen defeated Cora Farrell's team in the semifinals to face the defending champions, Team Jamie Sinclair, in the final. Thiesse and Sinclair were tied after nine ends, but Sinclair scored a single point in the final end to win the gold medal.

The next season brought a new line-up for Team Christensen. The Anderson twins left to join Jamie Sinclair, replaced by Madison Bear at lead and Vicky Persinger at third, and Jenna Martin moved to second. The team also got a new coach, Canadian Darah Blandford, in her first year with the USCA High Performance Program. Christensen was chosen to represent the United States at the third leg of the Curling World Cup in Jönköping, Sweden; the Curling World Cup was a four-part international tournament held around the world throughout the curling season. There they finished with a 3–3 record.

At the 2019 United States Women's Championship Thiesse finished the round-robin with a record of 5–2, good enough for the third seed in the page playoffs. In the 3 vs. 4 playoff game they defeated Stephanie Senneker's team by one point, 9–8. In the semifinal match against Nina Roth's team it came down to the last stone but Roth came through with the win, resulting in the bronze medal for Thiesse .

==== 2019–2020: Team Sinclair ====
Shortly after the 2018–19 curling season ended it was announced that Thiesse's team was dissolving; Martin decided to step away from competitive curling, Bear became skip of her own team, and Thiesse and Persinger joined Jamie Sinclair's team. Thiesse and Persinger took the third and second spots on Team Sinclair, respectively, while Sarah and Taylor Anderson, who had previously played those positions, moved up to lead and alternate. Retired Canadian curler Cathy Overton-Clapham joined Team Sinclair as their coach for the 2019–20 season. On the WCT the team won the Red Deer Curling Classic and followed it a couple of weeks later by making it to the quarterfinals at the Curl Mesabi Classic, where they lost to Tabitha Peterson's team.

The 2020 United States Women's Championship was the first national championship for Thiesse in a position other than skip. Thiesse and Team Sinclair only lost one game in the round robin, earning the number one seed in the playoffs. In the 1 vs. 2 page playoff Thiesse lost to Tabitha Peterson's team, who they faced again in the final after defeating Ariel Traxler's junior team in the semifinals. Peterson defeated Team Sinclair a second time in the final, with a final score of 7–5, resulting in Thiesse's second Women's Nationals silver medal.

==== 2020–2022: Team Christensen redux ====
At the end of the 2020 curling season, Thiesse and the other three members of Team Sinclair chose to form a new team within the U.S. High Performance Program. The new Team Christensen consisted of Cory as skip, Sarah Anderson third, Vicky Persinger second, and Taylor Anderson lead, with Cathy Overton-Clapham as coach. However, the 2020-21 season was largely shut down due to the COVID-19 pandemic. The team ended the abbreviated season by winning the 2021 United States Women's Curling Championship, which was held in May that year, after being postponed from February. Thiesse finished the round robin with a 5–1 record, and won both of her playoff games, including defeating her former skip Jamie Sinclair in the final.

The following season, Christensen played in the 2021 United States Olympic Curling Trials. Her team finished the round robin with a 7–3 record, putting her into the best-of-three final against Tabitha Peterson. The Thiesse rink lost two straight, missing a chance to make it to the 2021 Olympics. After the 2022 US Women's Championship were cancelled, Thiesse was invited to represent the United States at the 2022 World Women's Curling Championship. There, she led the United States to a 8–4 round robin record, and lost in the qualification game against Sweden's Anna Hasselborg. Thiesse wrapped up the season by playing in the 2022 Champions Cup Grand Slam event, where she missed the playoffs.

==== 2022–present: Team Peterson ====
Following the 2021–22 season, Thiesse's team broke up and she joined the Tabitha Peterson rink as their new third with second Becca Hamilton and lead Tara Peterson. After a semifinal finish at the US Open of Curling, the team missed the playoffs at both the 2022 National and the 2022 Tour Challenge Slam events. They represented the United States at the 2022 Pan Continental Curling Championships where they finished first in the round robin with a 7–1 record. They then lost to South Korea and Canada in the semifinal and bronze medal game respectively, finishing fourth. In their next event, Team Peterson reached the semifinals of the Red Deer Curling Classic where they lost to Rachel Homan. At the 2022 Masters, the team made it to the semifinals before losing to the Einarson rink. The following week, they won the Curl Mesabi Classic. In the new year, the team went undefeated to claim the 2023 United States Women's Curling Championship, defeating Delaney Strouse 8–5 in the final. This qualified them for the 2023 World Women's Curling Championship where they finished just outside the playoffs with a 6–6 record. The team ended their season at the 2023 Players' Championship and the 2023 Champions Cup Grand Slam events where they reached the quarterfinals and semifinals respectively. Thiesse did not play with the team at the Champions Cup, however.

Team Peterson won their second event of the 2023–24 season, losing just one game en route to claiming the US Open of Curling. They also had a semifinal finish at the 2023 Stu Sells Oakville Tankard and a quarterfinal appearance at the 2023 Curlers Corner Autumn Gold Curling Classic. For the 2023 Pan Continental Curling Championships, the team changed their lineup with Tara Peterson and Becca Hamilton switching positions to second and lead on the team respectively. The move worked as they finished 6–1 through the round robin. After a semifinal loss to Japan's Satsuki Fujisawa, Team Peterson bounced back to claim the bronze medal, stealing in an extra end to defeat Canada's Kerri Einarson. In Grand Slam play, they only qualified in one of the four events they played in, the 2023 Masters, losing in the quarterfinals to Silvana Tirinzoni. At the 2024 United States Women's Curling Championship, the Peterson rink lost their first game to Sarah Anderson before running the table the rest of the event. In the final, they doubled up on Team Anderson 10–5 to defend their title as national champions and qualify for the 2024 World Women's Curling Championship. At Worlds, the team struggled to find consistency, ultimately finishing 6–6 and failing to reach the playoffs for a second year in a row. Hamilton would announce that she would be stepping back from women's curling at the end of the season. Team Peterson would later announce that Taylor Anderson-Heide would be joining the team as their new lead.

Team Peterson would win the 2025 United States Olympic curling trials, qualifying them to represent the United States at the 2025 Olympic Qualification Event. There, they would finish round robin play with a 5–2 record, then beat Norway's Marianne Rørvik 8–4 to qualify for the 2026 Winter Olympics.

=== Mixed doubles ===
During the 2014–15 season Thiesse made her competitive debut in mixed doubles, a discipline of curling where teams are composed of one man and one woman. Thiesse teamed up with Derek Benson for the 2015 United States Mixed Doubles Championship. They finished with a 2–3 record, missing the playoffs, but one of their two wins was over Maureen and Peter Stolt, who went on to win the silver medal.

Thiesse did not return to the Mixed Doubles National Championship in 2016 but did join John Shuster to compete at the USCA's World Mixed Doubles Trials, a separate competition held to determine the United States representative at the 2016 World Mixed Doubles Championship. Shuster and Thiesse made it through a playdown of the USCA High Performance athletes to earn a spot in the World Trials. At the World Trials they finished with a 2–5 record.

Thiesse continued to compete in mixed doubles with John Shuster. The pair finished in second place at the 2017 United States Mixed Doubles Curling Olympic Trials and earned a national championship in 2019. For winning the National Championship Thiesse and Shuster got to continue on to the 2019 World Mixed Doubles Curling Championship, where they defeated Australia to earn the bronze medal. Thiesse and Shuster were named the United States Curling Association's 2019 Team of the Year for their accomplishments in mixed doubles. Thiesse and Shuster then went 5–4 at the 2021 United States mixed doubles curling Olympic trials, and lost in a tiebreaker to Jamie Sinclair and Rich Ruohonen.

Thiesse partnered with Korey Dropkin after six seasons with John Shuster. In their two tour events, the pair reached the semifinals of the Qualico Mixed Doubles Classic and lost in the final of the Southern Mixed Doubles. At the 2023 United States Mixed Doubles Curling Championship, the pair went undefeated to win the gold medal, defeating former teammate Sarah Anderson and Andrew Stopera in the final. This qualified Thiesse and Dropkin for the 2023 World Mixed Doubles Curling Championship where they finished second in their pool with a 7–2 record. The pair then defeated pre-tournament favorites Scotland and Canada in the quarters and semis. They then won 8–2 in the final against Japan's Chiaki Matsumura and Yasumasa Tanida to become the world mixed doubles champions, the first time the United States had ever won the title.

Trying to repeat as world mixed doubles champions, Thiesse and Dropkin played in two events to prepare for the 2024 United States Mixed Doubles Curling Championship. After a 6–1 semifinal finish at the Oakville Mixed Doubles Super Series, the pair went an undefeated 8–0 to claim the Rocky Mountain Mixed Doubles Classic. At the national championship, the team had a strong round robin, going undefeated to earn a bye to the semifinals. After defeating Aileen Geving and Thiesse's former partner John Shuster, Thiesse and Dropkin lost just their second game of the season, dropping the final 7–6 to Becca and Matt Hamilton. Their silver medal performance however, qualified them for the 2025 United States Mixed Doubles Curling Olympic Trials. At the US Olympic Trials, Thiesse and Dropkin went 8–1 in the round robin, and then went on to beat Sarah Anderson and Andrew Stopera in a best of three games final to qualify for the 2025 World Mixed Doubles Curling Championship. At the 2025 Worlds, Thiesse and Dropkin would finish in 5th place, earning enough points to directly qualify them to represent the USA at the 2026 Winter Olympics. In those Olympics she and Dropkin became the first American team to win a medal in Olympic mixed doubles curling, winning the silver medal and making her the first American woman to win any Olympic medal in curling.

== Personal life ==
Thiesse grew up in Duluth, Minnesota. She started curling at an early age, facilitated by both of her parents curling and the local Duluth Curling Club having a strong youth program. Her mother, Linda Christensen, has found competitive success on the curling ice as well, winning the United States Senior Curling Championship twice, in 2015 and 2016, and earning the bronze medal at the 2015 World Senior Championship.

Thiesse studied exercise science at the University of Minnesota, Duluth. She works as a lab technician.

On June 4, 2022, she married Sam Thiesse.

== Awards ==
- 2011 Women's Curtis Cup for Sportsmanship
- USA Curling’s 2016 Female Athlete of the Year
- USA Curling's 2019 Team of the Year

== Teams ==
=== Women's ===
Season	Skip	Third	Second	Lead	Alternate	Coach	Events
2010–11	Cory Christensen	Elizabeth Busche	Anna Bauman	Sonja Bauman			2011 USJCC (5th)
2011–12	Cory Christensen	Elizabeth Busche	Anna Bauman	Sonja Bauman	Rebecca Funk	Linda Christensen	2012 USJCC (gold); 2012 WJCC (10th)
2012–13	Cory Christensen	Rebecca Funk	Anna Bauman	Sonja Bauman		Linda Christensen	2013 USJCC (silver)
2012–13	Miranda Solem	Vicky Persinger	Karlie Koenig	Chelsea Solem	Cory Christensen	Mike Solem and John Benton	2013 WJCC (7th)
2013–14	Cory Christensen	Rebecca Funk	Anna Bauman	Mackenzie Lank	Sonja Bauman	John Benton	2013 WUG (8th)
2013–14	Cory Christensen	Mackenzie Lank	Anna Bauman	Anna Hopkins	Tina Persinger	Linda Christensen	2014 USJCC (gold); 2014 WJCC (6th)
2014–15	Cory Christensen	Sarah Anderson	Mackenzie Lank	Jenna Haag	Taylor Anderson	John Benton	2015 USJCC (gold); 2015 USWCC (4th); 2015 WJCC (5th)
2015–16	Cory Christensen	Sarah Anderson	Taylor Anderson	Madison Bear	Christine McMakin	Dave Jensen	2016 USJCC (gold); 2016 USWCC (bronze); 2016 WJCC (silver)
2016–17	Cory Christensen	Sarah Anderson	Taylor Anderson	Jenna Haag		Ann Swisshelm	2017 USWCC (5th)
2016–17	Nina Roth	Tabitha Peterson	Aileen Geving	Becca Hamilton	Cory Christensen	Ann Swisshelm	2017 WWCC (5th)
2017–18	Cory Christensen	Sarah Anderson	Taylor Anderson	Jenna Martin		Phill Drobnick	2017 USOCT (3rd); 2018 USWCC (silver)
2017–18	Nina Roth	Tabitha Peterson	Aileen Geving	Becca Hamilton	Cory Christensen	Al Hackner	2018 WOG (8th)
2018–19	Cory Christensen	Vicky Persinger	Jenna Martin	Madison Bear		Pete Fenson (CWC) Darah Blandford (USWCC)	CWC/3 (5th); 2019 USWCC (bronze)
2019–20	Jamie Sinclair	Cory Christensen	Vicky Persinger	Taylor Anderson	Sarah Anderson	Cathy Overton-Clapham	2020 USWCC (silver)
2020–21	Cory Christensen	Sarah Anderson	Vicky Persinger	Taylor Anderson		Cathy Overton-Clapham	2021 USWCC (gold)
2021–22	Cory Christensen	Sarah Anderson	Vicky Persinger	Taylor Anderson	Sydney Mullaney	Cathy Overton-Clapham	2021 USOCT (silver); 2022 WWCC (5th)
2022–23	Tabitha Peterson	Cory Thiesse	Becca Hamilton	Tara Peterson	Vicky Persinger (PCCC/WWCC)	Laine Peters	2022 PCCC (4th); 2023 USWCC (gold); 2023 WWCC (7th)
2023–24	Tabitha Peterson	Cory Thiesse	Tara Peterson	Becca Hamilton	Vicky Persinger (PCCC/WWCC)	Cathy Overton-Clapham	2023 PCCC (bronze); 2024 USWCC (gold); 2024 WWCC (7th)
2024–25	Tabitha Peterson	Cory Thiesse	Tara Peterson	Taylor Anderson-Heide	Vicky Persinger	Cathy Overton-Clapham	2025 USWCC (gold); 2025 WWCC (12th)
2024–25	Cory Thiesse	Vicky Persinger	Tara Peterson	Taylor Anderson-Heide	Aileen Geving	Cathy Overton-Clapham	2024 PCCC (5th)
2025–26	Tabitha Peterson	Cory Thiesse	Tara Peterson	Taylor Anderson-Heide		Cathy Overton-Clapham	

=== Mixed doubles ===
Season	Female	Male	Events
2014–15	Cory Christensen	Derek Benson	2015 USMDCC (DNQ)
2015–16	Cory Christensen	John Shuster	
2016–17	Cory Christensen	John Shuster	2017 USMDOT (2nd); 2017 USMDCC (TB)
2018–19	Cory Christensen	John Shuster	2019 USMDCC (gold); 2019 WMDCC (bronze)
2019–20	Cory Christensen	John Shuster	2020 USMDCC (silver)
2020–21	Cory Christensen	John Shuster	
2021–22	Cory Christensen	John Shuster	2021 USMDOT (T5th)
2022–23	Cory Thiesse	Korey Dropkin	2023 USMDCC (gold); 2023 WMDCC (gold)
2023–24	Cory Thiesse	Korey Dropkin	2024 USMDCC (silver)
2024–25	Cory Thiesse	Korey Dropkin	2025 USMDOT (gold); 2025 WMDCC (5th)
2025–26	Cory Thiesse	Korey Dropkin	2026 WOG (silver)

== Grand Slam record ==
Key
C	Champion
F	Lost in Final
SF	Lost in Semifinal
QF	Lost in Quarterfinals
R16	Lost in the round of 16
Q	Did not advance to playoffs
T2	Played in Tier 2 event
DNP	Did not participate in event
N/A	Not a Grand Slam event that season

Event	2018–19	2019–20	2020–21	2021–22	2022–23	2023–24	2024–25	2025–26
Masters	DNP	DNP	N/A	DNP	SF	QF	DNP	T2
Tour Challenge	Q	DNP	N/A	N/A	Q	Q	Q	DNP
The National	DNP	DNP	N/A	DNP	Q	Q	DNP	DNP
Canadian Open	DNP	DNP	N/A	N/A	Q	Q	DNP	DNP
Players'	DNP	N/A	DNP	DNP	QF	DNP	DNP	QF
Champions Cup	DNP	N/A	DNP	Q	DNP	N/A	N/A	N/A
