= 2023 United States Mixed Doubles Curling Championship =

- Host city: Kalamazoo, Michigan
- Arena: Wings Event Center
- Dates: February 28 - March 5
- Winner: (Minnesota) Thiesse / Dropkin
- Female: Cory Thiesse
- Male: Korey Dropkin
- Finalist: (Minnesota) S. Anderson / (New York (state)) Stopera

The 2023 United States Mixed Doubles Curling Championship were held from February 28 to March 5, 2023, at the Wings Event Center in Kalamazoo, Michigan. The championship featured sixteen teams, split into two pools of eight teams. After a round-robin within each pool, the top three teams from each pool advanced to a single-elimination playoff bracket.

The winning team represented the United States at the 2023 World Mixed Doubles Curling Championship in Gangneung, South Korea.

== Teams ==
The teams competing in the 2023 championship were:

Female	Male	Locale
Taylor Anderson	Ben Richardson	Minneapolis, Minnesota
Sarah Anderson	Andrew Stopera	Chaska, Minnesota
Regan Birr	Todd Birr	Ham Lake, Minnesota
Nicole Bookhout	Dan Wiza	Madison, Wisconsin
Melissa Fountain	Tony Kot	Lafayette, Colorado
Aileen Geving	John Shuster	Duluth, Minnesota
Becca Hamilton	Matt Hamilton	Madison, Wisconsin
Clare Moores	Lance Wheeler	Denver, Colorado
Sydney Mullaney	Chase Sinnett	Chaska, Minnesota
Kirstin Nickel	Gabriel Nickel	Hudson, Wisconsin
Vicky Persinger	Chris Plys	Fairbanks, Alaska
Ann Podoll	Nate Parry	Fargo, North Dakota
Kim Rhyme	Jason Smith	Minneapolis, Minnesota
Harley Rohrbacher	Vincent Scebbi	Cleveland, Ohio
Delaney Strouse	Daniel Casper	Minneapolis, Minnesota
Cory Thiesse	Korey Dropkin	Duluth, Minnesota
