= 2017 United States Mixed Doubles Curling Championship =

- Host city: Blaine, Minnesota
- Arena: Four Seasons Curling Club
- Dates: March 2–5, 2017
- Winner: Matt Hamilton and Becca Hamilton

The 2017 United States Mixed Doubles Curling Championship was held from March 2–5 at the Four Seasons Curling Club in Blaine, Minnesota. Matt Hamilton and Becca Hamilton won the tournament, earning the right to represent the United States at the 2017 World Mixed Doubles Curling Championship in Lethbridge, Canada.

== Teams ==
Twelve teams qualified to compete in the championship. Six of the teams were automatically qualified and the remaining six teams made it into the tournament by being the top teams in a 22 team qualifying round held at Curl Mesabi in January 2017.

Female	Male	State(s)
Becca Hamilton	Matt Hamilton	Wisconsin
Courtney George	Tyler George	Minnesota
Nina Roth	Kroy Nernberger	Wisconsin
Aileen Geving	Chris Plys	Minnesota
Tabitha Peterson	Joe Polo	Minnesota
Cory Christensen	John Shuster	Wisconsin, Minnesota
Jamie Sinclair	Korey Dropkin	Minnesota
Alex Carlson	Derrick McLean	Minnesota, Washington
Maureen Stolt	Peter Stolt	Minnesota
Monica Walker	Jason Smith	Minnesota
Cristin Clark	Matt Birklid	Washington
Vicky Persinger	Jared Zezel	Alaska, Minnesota

== Round robin ==
=== Standings ===
Key
Teams to playoffs
Teams to Tiebreaker

Pool A	W	L
Persinger / Zezel	4	1
Peterson / Polo	4	1
Carlson / McLean	2	3
Christensen / Shuster	2	3
Clark / Birklid	2	3
Geving / Plys	1	4

Pool B	W	L
Roth / Nernberger	3	1
Sinclair / Dropkin	3	2
George / George	2	2
Hamilton / Hamilton	2	3
Stolt / Stolt	2	3
Walker / Smith	2	3

=== Tiebreakers ===
==== Pool A ====
Saturday, March 4, 12:00 noon ET

Team	1	2	3	4	5	6	7	8	Final
Carlson/McLean	3	0	0	3	0	6	X	X	12
Christensen/Shuster	0	1	2	0	1	0	X	X	4

Saturday, March 4, 4:00pm ET

Team	1	2	3	4	5	6	7	8	Final
Clark/Birklid	1	0	1	0	2	0	0	X	4
Carlson/McLean	0	6	0	1	0	3	2	X	12

==== Pool B ====
Saturday, March 4, 12:00 noon ET

Team	1	2	3	4	5	6	7	8	Final
Stolt/Stolt	0	2	2	0	1	0	0	1	6
George/George	1	0	0	1	0	1	1	0	4

Team	1	2	3	4	5	6	7	8	9	Final
Hamilton/Hamilton	0	4	1	0	0	2	0	2	1	10
Walker/Smith	3	0	0	1	3	0	2	0	0	9

Saturday, March 4, 4:00pm ET

Team	1	2	3	4	5	6	7	8	Final
Stolt/Stolt	0	0	0	1	0	0	1	X	2
Hamilton/Hamilton	1	1	2	0	3	1	0	X	8

== Playoffs ==
The playoffs consisted of a 6-team bracket with the top two teams receiving byes in the quarterfinals.

=== Bracket ===
Quarterfinals
Sinclair/Dropkin	5
Carlson/McLean	7
Persinger/Zezel	3
Hamilton/Hamilton	9

Semifinals
Carlson/McLean	6
Peterson/Polo	7
Hamilton/Hamilton	9
Roth/Nernberger	5

Final
Peterson/Polo	6
Hamilton/Hamilton	7

=== Quarterfinals ===
Saturday, March 4, 8:00pm ET

Team	1	2	3	4	5	6	7	8	Final
Sinclair/Dropkin	2	0	0	1	0	0	2	0	5
Carlson/McLean	0	1	1	0	2	1	0	2	7

Team	1	2	3	4	5	6	7	8	Final
Persinger/Zezel	0	2	0	1	0	0	0	X	3
Hamilton/Hamilton	1	0	1	0	3	3	1	X	9

=== Semifinals ===
Sunday, March 5, 9:00am ET

Team	1	2	3	4	5	6	7	8	Final
Peterson/Polo	2	0	1	1	0	2	0	1	7
Carlson/McLean	0	1	0	0	1	0	4	0	6

Team	1	2	3	4	5	6	7	8	Final
Roth/Nernberger	0	1	0	0	2	2	0	X	5
Hamilton/Hamilton	1	0	2	2	0	0	4	X	9

=== Finals ===
Sunday, March 5, 1:00pm ET

Team	1	2	3	4	5	6	7	8	Final
Peterson/Polo	0	2	0	1	1	0	2	0	6
Hamilton/Hamilton	4	0	1	0	0	1	0	1	7
