= 2019 United States Mixed Doubles Curling Championship =

- Host city: Seattle, Washington
- Arena: Granite Curling Club
- Dates: February 27-March 3, 2019
- Winner: Cory Christensen and John Shuster

The 2019 United States Mixed Doubles Curling Championship was held from February 27-March 3, 2019 at the Granite Curling Club in Seattle, Washington. Cory Christensen and John Shuster won the tournament, earning the right to represent the United States at the 2019 World Mixed Doubles Curling Championship in Stavanger, Norway.

== Qualification ==
Nine teams qualified for the championship based on their performance on the World Curling Tour:

- Sarah Anderson and Korey Dropkin
- Becca Hamilton and Matt Hamilton
- Monica Walker and Alex Leichter
- Vicky Persinger and Chris Plys
- Em Good and Mac Guy
- Jamie Sinclair and Sean Beighton
- Tabitha Peterson and Joe Polo
- Cory Christensen and John Shuster
- Nina Roth and Kroy Nernberger

The remaining three teams qualified through the 2019 USA Curling Mixed Doubles Challenge Round:

- Maureen Stolt and Peter Stolt
- Taylor Anderson and Derrick McLean
- Clare Moores and Lance Wheeler

=== Challenge round ===
The 2019 USA Curling Mixed Doubles Challenge Round was held December 19 to 23, 2018 at the Grand Forks Curling Club in Grand Forks, North Dakota. Ten teams competed in triple-knockout tournament, with the top three teams earning a spot at the Championship. Husband and wife duo Peter and Maureen Stolt were the first to clinch one of the available berths when they defeated Taylor Anderson and Derrick McLean in the 'A' bracket final. Anderson and McLean then dropped down to the 'B' bracket final where they had another opportunity to earn one of the final two berths, which they did when they defeated Ann Podoll and Nathan Parry. Losing the 'B' bracket final knocked Podoll and Parry down to the 'C' bracket semifinals. Podoll and Parry made it through their semifinal match to face Clare Moores and Lance Wheeler in the 'C' bracket final. Tied at 7–7 after eight ends, Moores and Wheeler scored one in the extra end to secure the final team slot at the Mixed Doubles Championship.

== Teams ==
The following 12 teams qualified for the event:

State(s)	Female	Male
Minnesota	Sarah Anderson	Korey Dropkin
Minnesota Washington	Taylor Anderson	Derrick McLean
Minnesota	Cory Christensen	John Shuster
Washington	Em Good	Mac Guy
Wisconsin	Becca Hamilton	Matt Hamilton
Colorado	Clare Moores	Lance Wheeler
Alaska Minnesota	Vicky Persinger	Chris Plys
Minnesota	Tabitha Peterson	Joe Polo
Wisconsin	Nina Roth	Kroy Nernberger
Minnesota Washington	Jamie Sinclair	Sean Beighton
Minnesota	Maureen Stolt	Peter Stolt
Minnesota Massachusetts	Monica Walker	Alex Leichter

== Round robin ==
=== Standings ===
Pool A	W	L
Anderson / Dropkin	4	1
Christensen / Shuster	4	1
Persinger / Plys	4	1
Sinclair / Beighton	2	3
Anderson / McLean	1	4
Moores / Wheeler	0	5

Pool B	W	L
Peterson / Polo	5	0
Hamilton / Hamilton	3	2
Roth / Nernberger	3	2
Walker / Leichter	2	3
Good / Guy	1	4
Stolt / Stolt	1	4

Teams highlighted in yellow qualified for the playoffs.

=== Game results ===
==== Draw 1 ====
Wednesday, February 27, 7:00 pm

Sheet 1	1	2	3	4	5	6	7	8	Final
Stolt/Stolt 🔨	0	1	0	0	0	X	X	X	1
Hamilton/Hamilton	2	0	5	2	3	X	X	X	12

Sheet 2	1	2	3	4	5	6	7	8	9	Final
Roth/Nernberger 🔨	1	3	1	1	1	0	2	0	0	9
Peterson/Polo	0	0	0	0	0	5	0	4	2	11

Sheet 3	1	2	3	4	5	6	7	8	Final
Persinger/Plys 🔨	0	2	0	3	0	1	0	1	7
Christensen/Shuster	1	0	1	0	3	0	1	0	6

Sheet 4	1	2	3	4	5	6	7	8	Final
Anderson/McLean	0	3	0	1	0	1	0	3	8
Moores/Wheeler 🔨	2	0	1	0	3	0	1	0	7

Sheet 5	1	2	3	4	5	6	7	8	Final
Anderson/Dropkin 🔨	5	2	1	2	0	1	X	X	11
Sinclair/Beighton	0	0	0	0	4	0	X	X	4

==== Draw 2 ====
Thursday, February 28, 10:00 am

Sheet 1	1	2	3	4	5	6	7	8	Final
Walker/Leichter	2	0	2	1	0	0	2	0	7
Good/Guy 🔨	0	1	0	0	3	2	0	3	9

Sheet 2	1	2	3	4	5	6	7	8	9	Final
Moores/Wheeler 🔨	0	1	1	0	1	1	0	2	0	6
Anderson/Dropkin	1	0	0	3	0	0	2	0	1	7

Sheet 4	1	2	3	4	5	6	7	8	Final
Persinger/Plys	3	0	0	0	2	1	0	4	10
Sinclair/Beighton 🔨	0	2	1	1	0	0	1	0	5

==== Draw 3 ====
Thursday, February 28, 2:30 pm

Sheet 1	1	2	3	4	5	6	7	8	Final
Persinger/Plys 🔨	2	0	1	1	0	2	2	X	8
Moores/Wheeler	0	3	0	0	1	0	0	X	4

Sheet 2	1	2	3	4	5	6	7	8	Final
Hamilton/Hamilton	0	0	1	0	1	0	3	X	5
Roth/Nernberger 🔨	4	1	0	1	0	1	0	X	7

Sheet 3	1	2	3	4	5	6	7	8	Final
Good/Guy	0	0	0	0	3	0	3	0	6
Stolt/Stolt 🔨	1	1	1	1	0	2	0	2	8

Sheet 4	1	2	3	4	5	6	7	8	Final
Walker/Leichter	0	1	0	3	1	1	1	0	7
Peterson/Polo 🔨	2	0	2	0	0	0	0	4	8

Sheet 5	1	2	3	4	5	6	7	8	Final
Christensen/Shuster	1	2	0	2	0	3	0	X	8
Anderson/McLean 🔨	0	0	1	0	2	0	1	X	4

==== Draw 4 ====
Thursday, February 28, 7:00 pm

Sheet 1	1	2	3	4	5	6	7	8	Final
Good/Guy 🔨	0	2	3	0	0	0	1	X	6
Peterson/Polo	1	0	0	5	2	1	0	X	9

Sheet 2	1	2	3	4	5	6	7	8	Final
Christensen/Shuster 🔨	3	0	2	0	1	2	0	X	8
Sinclair/Beighton	0	2	0	1	0	0	1	X	4

Sheet 3	1	2	3	4	5	6	7	8	Final
Anderson/McLean 🔨	0	5	0	1	0	1	0	0	7
Anderson/Dropkin	1	0	4	0	3	0	3	2	13

Sheet 4	1	2	3	4	5	6	7	8	Final
Stolt/Stolt 🔨	1	0	1	0	1	0	1	1	5
Roth/Nernberger	0	1	0	2	0	3	0	0	6

Sheet 5	1	2	3	4	5	6	7	8	Final
Walker/Leichter 🔨	0	0	0	0	1	0	X	X	1
Hamilton/Hamilton	2	2	1	1	0	3	X	X	9

==== Draw 5 ====
Friday, March 1, 10:00 am

Sheet 2	1	2	3	4	5	6	7	8	Final
Stolt/Stolt	0	1	0	2	0	1	1	0	5
Walker/Leichter 🔨	2	0	2	0	2	0	0	1	7

Sheet 3	1	2	3	4	5	6	7	8	Final
Peterson/Polo 🔨	1	0	1	2	2	0	2	X	8
Hamilton/Hamilton	0	1	0	0	0	3	0	X	4

==== Draw 6 ====
Friday, March 1, 2:30 pm

Sheet 1	1	2	3	4	5	6	7	8	9	Final
Anderson/Dropkin 🔨	0	0	1	2	0	1	2	0	0	6
Christensen/Shuster	1	1	0	0	3	0	0	1	2	8

Sheet 2	1	2	3	4	5	6	7	8	Final
Anderson/McLean	1	0	1	0	1	0	0	X	3
Persinger/Plys 🔨	0	1	0	4	0	2	2	X	9

Sheet 3	1	2	3	4	5	6	7	8	Final
Sinclair/Beighton	1	0	3	1	1	1	0	X	7
Moores/Wheeler 🔨	0	1	0	0	0	0	1	X	2

Sheet 4	1	2	3	4	5	6	7	8	Final
Roth/Nernberger 🔨	5	2	0	2	3	X	X	X	12
Good/Guy	0	0	1	0	0	X	X	X	1

Sheet 5	1	2	3	4	5	6	7	8	Final
Peterson/Polo 🔨	2	1	0	3	2	0	X	X	8
Stolt/Stolt	0	0	1	0	0	1	X	X	2

==== Draw 7 ====
Friday, March 1, 7:00 pm

Sheet 1	1	2	3	4	5	6	7	8	Final
Sinclair/Beighton 🔨	2	1	0	1	1	1	X	X	6
Anderson/McLean	0	0	1	0	0	0	X	X	1

Sheet 2	1	2	3	4	5	6	7	8	Final
Hamilton/Hamilton 🔨	4	2	0	1	0	3	X	X	10
Good/Guy	0	0	1	0	1	0	X	X	2

Sheet 3	1	2	3	4	5	6	7	8	Final
Roth/Nernberger	0	0	3	1	0	0	0	X	4
Walker/Leichter 🔨	1	1	0	0	5	1	1	X	9

Sheet 4	1	2	3	4	5	6	7	8	Final
Moores/Wheeler 🔨	1	0	5	0	0	0	0	0	6
Christensen/Shuster	0	1	0	2	1	2	1	1	8

Sheet 5	1	2	3	4	5	6	7	8	Final
Anderson/Dropkin	0	0	2	2	0	1	2	X	7
Persinger/Plys 🔨	1	1	0	0	1	0	0	X	3

== Playoffs ==
The playoffs consisted of a 6-team bracket with the top two teams receiving byes in the quarterfinals.

=== Bracket ===
Quarterfinals
Christensen/Shuster	6
Hamilton/Hamilton	5
Anderson/Dropkin	5
Roth/Nernberger	7

Semifinals
Christensen/Shuster	6
Peterson/Polo	5
Roth/Nernberger	2
Persinger/Plys	8

Final
Christensen/Shuster	7
Persinger/Plys	5

=== Quarterfinals ===
Saturday, March 2, 2:30pm

Sheet 2	1	2	3	4	5	6	7	8	Final
Hamilton/Hamilton 🔨	0	2	0	2	0	0	1	0	5
Christensen/Shuster	1	0	1	0	2	1	0	1	6

Sheet 4	1	2	3	4	5	6	7	8	Final
Anderson/Dropkin	0	0	2	0	1	0	2	0	5
Roth/Nernberger 🔨	1	1	0	1	0	3	0	1	7

=== Semifinals ===
Saturday, March 2, 7:00pm

Sheet 2	1	2	3	4	5	6	7	8	Final
Peterson/Polo 🔨	0	1	0	1	0	1	2	X	5
Christensen/Shuster	1	0	2	0	2	0	1	X	6

Sheet 4	1	2	3	4	5	6	7	8	Final
Persinger/Plys 🔨	1	0	0	3	1	3	X	X	8
Roth/Nernberger	0	1	1	0	0	0	X	X	2

=== Finals ===
Sunday, March 3, 11:00am

Sheet 3	1	2	3	4	5	6	7	8	Final
Christensen/Shuster	0	3	1	0	0	1	1	1	7
Persinger/Plys 🔨	2	0	0	2	1	0	0	0	5
