= 2025 United States Olympic mixed doubles curling trials =

2025 United States Mixed Doubles Curling Olympic trials
- Host city: Lafayette, Colorado
- Arena: Rock Creek Curling
- Dates: February 17–23
- Winner: (Minnesota) Thiesse / Dropkin
- Female: Cory Thiesse
- Male: Korey Dropkin
- Finalist: (Minnesota) Anderson / Stopera

The 2025 United States Mixed Doubles Curling Olympic Trials were held from February 17 to 23, 2025, at Rock Creek Curling in Lafayette, Colorado. The trials featured ten teams that played in a round robin tournament with the top four teams qualifying for the page playoff. The final was then a best of three to determine the winner.

The winning team of Cory Thiesse and Korey Dropkin represented the United States at the 2025 World Mixed Doubles Curling Championship in Fredericton, New Brunswick, where they qualified for the 2026 Winter Olympics in Cortina d'Ampezzo, Italy.

== Qualification ==
Teams qualified for these Olympics Trials through either their performance at the most recent national championships, the pre-trials, a Direct-Entry Qualifier event, or their mixed-doubles ranking.

| Qualification | Berths | Qualifying team(s) |
|---|---|---|
| Medalists at the 2024 US Mixed Doubles Nationals | 3 | (Wisconsin) Hamilton / Hamilton (Minnesota) Thiesse / Dropkin (Minnesota) Geving / Shuster |
| Qualifiers from the 2024 Olympic Pre-Trials | 4 | (Minnesota) Anderson / Stopera (Minnesota) Bear / Oldenburg (Colorado) Moores / Wheeler (Minnesota) Anderson-Heide / Richardson |
| Winners of Mixed Doubles Trials Qualifier #1 | 1 | (Minnesota) Daly / Violette |
| Winners of Mixed Doubles Trials Qualifier #2 | 1 | (Wisconsin) Roth / Nernberger |
| Highest-Ranking Non-Qualified Team | 1 | (Colorado) Weldon / Franey |

== Teams ==
The teams competing in the 2025 trials are:

| Female | Male | Locale |
|---|---|---|
| Taylor Anderson-Heide | Ben Richardson | Chaska, Minnesota |
| Sarah Anderson | Andrew Stopera | Chaska, Minnesota |
| Madison Bear | Aidan Oldenburg | Chaska, Minnesota |
| Lexi Daly | Luc Violette | Duluth, Minnesota |
| Aileen Geving | John Shuster | Duluth, Minnesota |
| Becca Hamilton | Matt Hamilton | McFarland, Wisconsin |
| Clare Moores | Lance Wheeler | Golden, Colorado |
| Nina Roth | Kroy Nernberger | Madison, Wisconsin |
| Cory Thiesse | Korey Dropkin | Duluth, Minnesota |
| Brianna Weldon | Sean Franey | Denver, Colorado |

== Round-robin standings ==
Final Round Robin Standings

Key
| Teams to Playoffs |
| Teams to Tiebreaker |

| Team | W | L | W–L | PF | PA | EW | EL | BE | SE | DSC |
|---|---|---|---|---|---|---|---|---|---|---|
| (Minnesota) Thiesse / Dropkin | 8 | 1 | – | 71 | 34 | 38 | 25 | 0 | 15 | 27.14 |
| (Minnesota) Anderson / Stopera | 7 | 2 | – | 70 | 41 | 35 | 28 | 0 | 16 | 46.26 |
| (Minnesota) Bear / Oldenburg | 6 | 3 | – | 55 | 63 | 33 | 31 | 0 | 13 | 37.94 |
| (Minnesota) Daly / Violette | 5 | 4 | 2–0 | 56 | 60 | 32 | 36 | 0 | 6 | 44.68 |
| (Minnesota) Anderson-Heide / Richardson | 5 | 4 | 1–1 | 60 | 52 | 38 | 29 | 0 | 13 | 26.25 |
| (Wisconsin) Roth / Nernberger | 5 | 4 | 0–2 | 64 | 51 | 36 | 32 | 0 | 9 | 22.98 |
| (Wisconsin) Hamilton / Hamilton | 4 | 5 | – | 53 | 68 | 31 | 36 | 0 | 9 | 29.19 |
| (Minnesota) Geving / Shuster | 3 | 6 | – | 53 | 62 | 29 | 37 | 0 | 4 | 29.91 |
| (Colorado) Weldon / Franey | 2 | 7 | – | 52 | 66 | 30 | 36 | 0 | 8 | 33.03 |
| (Colorado) Moores / Wheeler | 0 | 9 | – | 40 | 80 | 26 | 38 | 0 | 6 | 41.33 |

Round Robin Summary Table
| Pos. | Team | (Minnesota) AH/R | (Minnesota) A/S | (Minnesota) B/O | (Minnesota) D/V | (Minnesota) G/S | (Wisconsin) H/H | (Colorado) M/W | (Wisconsin) R/N | (Minnesota) T/D | (Colorado) W/F | Record |
|---|---|---|---|---|---|---|---|---|---|---|---|---|
| 5 | (Minnesota) Anderson-Heide / Richardson | — | 3–7 | 9–2 | 5–6 | 8–7 | 6–7 | 7–3 | 8–6 | 7–8 | 7–6 | 5–4 |
| 2 | (Minnesota) Anderson / Stopera | 7–3 | — | 12–3 | 7–5 | 8–5 | 9–1 | 7–5 | 7–8 | 2–8 | 11–3 | 7–2 |
| 3 | (Minnesota) Bear / Oldenburg | 2–9 | 3–12 | — | 8–4 | 3–11 | 8–4 | 9–7 | 10–6 | 6–5 | 6–5 | 6–3 |
| 4 | (Minnesota) Daly / Violette | 6–5 | 5–7 | 4–8 | — | 6–3 | 6–7 | 8–6 | 6–5 | 4–9 | 11–10 | 5–4 |
| 8 | (Minnesota) Geving / Shuster | 7–8 | 5–8 | 11–3 | 3–6 | — | 7–9 | 8–3 | 3–9 | 1–9 | 8–7 | 3–6 |
| 7 | (Wisconsin) Hamilton / Hamilton | 7–6 | 1–9 | 4–8 | 7–6 | 9–7 | — | 10–8 | 5–6 | 4–9 | 6–7 | 4–5 |
| 10 | (Colorado) Moores / Wheeler | 3–7 | 5–7 | 7–9 | 6–8 | 3–8 | 8–10 | — | 2–11 | 3–10 | 3–10 | 0–9 |
| 6 | (Wisconsin) Roth / Nernberger | 6–8 | 8–7 | 6–10 | 5–6 | 9–3 | 6–5 | 11–2 | — | 6–7 | 7–3 | 5–4 |
| 1 | (Minnesota) Thiesse / Dropkin | 8–7 | 8–2 | 5–6 | 9–4 | 9–1 | 9–4 | 10–3 | 7–6 | — | 7–1 | 8–1 |
| 9 | (Colorado) Weldon / Franey | 6–7 | 3–11 | 5–6 | 10–11 | 7–8 | 7–6 | 10–3 | 3–7 | 1–7 | — | 2–7 |

== Round-robin results ==
All draw times are listed in Mountain Time Zone (UTC−07:00).

=== Draw 1 ===
Monday, February 17, 7:00 pm

| Sheet B | 1 | 2 | 3 | 4 | 5 | 6 | 7 | 8 | Final |
| (Minnesota) Anderson / Stopera | 2 | 0 | 2 | 0 | 3 | 0 | 0 | X | 7 |
| (Minnesota) Daly / Violette | 0 | 2 | 0 | 1 | 0 | 1 | 1 | X | 5 |

| Sheet C | 1 | 2 | 3 | 4 | 5 | 6 | 7 | 8 | Final |
| (Wisconsin) Roth / Nernberger | 0 | 1 | 0 | 2 | 0 | 2 | 0 | 1 | 6 |
| (Minnesota) Anderson-Heide / Richardson | 2 | 0 | 2 | 0 | 3 | 0 | 1 | 0 | 8 |

| Sheet D | 1 | 2 | 3 | 4 | 5 | 6 | 7 | 8 | Final |
| (Colorado) Moores / Wheeler | 3 | 0 | 1 | 0 | 2 | 2 | 0 | X | 8 |
| (Wisconsin) Hamilton / Hamilton | 0 | 4 | 0 | 3 | 0 | 0 | 3 | X | 10 |

| Sheet E | 1 | 2 | 3 | 4 | 5 | 6 | 7 | 8 | Final |
| (Colorado) Weldon / Franey | 1 | 0 | 0 | 3 | 0 | 0 | 1 | 2 | 7 |
| (Minnesota) Geving / Shuster | 0 | 4 | 1 | 0 | 2 | 1 | 0 | 0 | 8 |

| Sheet F | 1 | 2 | 3 | 4 | 5 | 6 | 7 | 8 | Final |
| (Minnesota) Thiesse / Dropkin | 0 | 0 | 0 | 3 | 0 | 0 | 2 | 0 | 5 |
| (Minnesota) Bear / Oldenburg | 1 | 1 | 1 | 0 | 1 | 1 | 0 | 1 | 6 |

=== Draw 2 ===
Tuesday, February 18, 12:00 pm

| Sheet B | 1 | 2 | 3 | 4 | 5 | 6 | 7 | 8 | Final |
| (Minnesota) Geving / Shuster | 0 | 1 | 0 | 0 | 0 | 0 | X | X | 1 |
| (Minnesota) Thiesse / Dropkin | 2 | 0 | 3 | 2 | 1 | 1 | X | X | 9 |

| Sheet C | 1 | 2 | 3 | 4 | 5 | 6 | 7 | 8 | Final |
| (Wisconsin) Hamilton / Hamilton | 3 | 0 | 0 | 0 | 1 | 0 | 2 | 0 | 6 |
| (Colorado) Weldon / Franey | 0 | 3 | 1 | 1 | 0 | 1 | 0 | 1 | 7 |

| Sheet D | 1 | 2 | 3 | 4 | 5 | 6 | 7 | 8 | Final |
| (Minnesota) Bear / Oldenburg | 3 | 0 | 2 | 2 | 0 | 3 | 0 | X | 10 |
| (Wisconsin) Roth / Nernberger | 0 | 3 | 0 | 0 | 1 | 0 | 2 | X | 6 |

| Sheet E | 1 | 2 | 3 | 4 | 5 | 6 | 7 | 8 | Final |
| (Minnesota) Anderson / Stopera | 0 | 2 | 0 | 1 | 0 | 3 | 1 | X | 7 |
| (Minnesota) Anderson-Heide / Richardson | 1 | 0 | 1 | 0 | 1 | 0 | 0 | X | 3 |

| Sheet F | 1 | 2 | 3 | 4 | 5 | 6 | 7 | 8 | Final |
| (Colorado) Moores / Wheeler | 1 | 0 | 1 | 1 | 1 | 0 | 2 | 0 | 6 |
| (Minnesota) Daly / Violette | 0 | 3 | 0 | 0 | 0 | 3 | 0 | 2 | 8 |

=== Draw 3 ===
Tuesday, February 18, 7:00 pm

| Sheet B | 1 | 2 | 3 | 4 | 5 | 6 | 7 | 8 | Final |
| (Colorado) Weldon / Franey | 4 | 0 | 2 | 1 | 0 | 2 | 1 | X | 10 |
| (Colorado) Moores / Wheeler | 0 | 2 | 0 | 0 | 1 | 0 | 0 | X | 3 |

| Sheet C | 1 | 2 | 3 | 4 | 5 | 6 | 7 | 8 | Final |
| (Minnesota) Bear / Oldenburg | 0 | 1 | 0 | 1 | 0 | 1 | 0 | X | 3 |
| (Minnesota) Anderson / Stopera | 2 | 0 | 3 | 0 | 2 | 0 | 5 | X | 12 |

| Sheet D | 1 | 2 | 3 | 4 | 5 | 6 | 7 | 8 | Final |
| (Minnesota) Daly / Violette | 0 | 0 | 1 | 0 | 2 | 2 | 0 | 1 | 6 |
| (Minnesota) Anderson-Heide / Richardson | 1 | 1 | 0 | 1 | 0 | 0 | 2 | 0 | 5 |

| Sheet E | 1 | 2 | 3 | 4 | 5 | 6 | 7 | 8 | Final |
| (Wisconsin) Hamilton / Hamilton | 1 | 0 | 0 | 2 | 1 | 0 | 0 | X | 4 |
| (Minnesota) Thiesse / Dropkin | 0 | 2 | 2 | 0 | 0 | 2 | 3 | X | 9 |

| Sheet F | 1 | 2 | 3 | 4 | 5 | 6 | 7 | 8 | Final |
| (Minnesota) Geving / Shuster | 1 | 0 | 1 | 0 | 1 | 0 | 0 | X | 3 |
| (Wisconsin) Roth / Nernberger | 0 | 2 | 0 | 2 | 0 | 2 | 3 | X | 9 |

=== Draw 4 ===
Wednesday, February 19, 9:00 am

| Sheet B | 1 | 2 | 3 | 4 | 5 | 6 | 7 | 8 | Final |
| (Minnesota) Bear / Oldenburg | 0 | 2 | 0 | 0 | 0 | 0 | X | X | 2 |
| (Minnesota) Anderson-Heide / Richardson | 1 | 0 | 3 | 1 | 1 | 3 | X | X | 9 |

| Sheet C | 1 | 2 | 3 | 4 | 5 | 6 | 7 | 8 | Final |
| (Colorado) Moores / Wheeler | 0 | 0 | 1 | 1 | 0 | 1 | 0 | X | 3 |
| (Minnesota) Geving / Shuster | 2 | 1 | 0 | 0 | 1 | 0 | 4 | X | 8 |

| Sheet D | 1 | 2 | 3 | 4 | 5 | 6 | 7 | 8 | Final |
| (Colorado) Weldon / Franey | 0 | 0 | 0 | 1 | 0 | 0 | X | X | 1 |
| (Minnesota) Thiesse / Dropkin | 1 | 1 | 2 | 0 | 2 | 1 | X | X | 7 |

| Sheet E | 1 | 2 | 3 | 4 | 5 | 6 | 7 | 8 | Final |
| (Minnesota) Daly / Violette | 1 | 2 | 0 | 0 | 0 | 1 | 0 | 2 | 6 |
| (Wisconsin) Roth / Nernberger | 0 | 0 | 1 | 1 | 2 | 0 | 1 | 0 | 5 |

| Sheet F | 1 | 2 | 3 | 4 | 5 | 6 | 7 | 8 | Final |
| (Wisconsin) Hamilton / Hamilton | 0 | 0 | 0 | 0 | 0 | 1 | X | X | 1 |
| (Minnesota) Anderson / Stopera | 2 | 1 | 1 | 1 | 4 | 0 | X | X | 9 |

=== Draw 5 ===
Wednesday, February 19, 12:00 pm

| Sheet B | 1 | 2 | 3 | 4 | 5 | 6 | 7 | 8 | Final |
| (Wisconsin) Roth / Nernberger | 0 | 2 | 0 | 3 | 0 | 1 | 0 | 0 | 6 |
| (Wisconsin) Hamilton / Hamilton | 1 | 0 | 1 | 0 | 1 | 0 | 1 | 1 | 5 |

| Sheet C | 1 | 2 | 3 | 4 | 5 | 6 | 7 | 8 | Final |
| (Minnesota) Thiesse / Dropkin | 3 | 0 | 2 | 0 | 2 | 0 | 2 | X | 9 |
| (Minnesota) Daly / Violette | 0 | 1 | 0 | 2 | 0 | 1 | 0 | X | 4 |

| Sheet D | 1 | 2 | 3 | 4 | 5 | 6 | 7 | 8 | Final |
| (Minnesota) Geving / Shuster | 0 | 0 | 2 | 0 | 0 | 3 | 0 | 0 | 5 |
| (Minnesota) Anderson / Stopera | 1 | 1 | 0 | 1 | 1 | 0 | 1 | 3 | 8 |

| Sheet E | 1 | 2 | 3 | 4 | 5 | 6 | 7 | 8 | Final |
| (Colorado) Moores / Wheeler | 0 | 0 | 2 | 0 | 4 | 0 | 1 | 0 | 7 |
| (Minnesota) Bear / Oldenburg | 2 | 2 | 0 | 2 | 0 | 2 | 0 | 1 | 9 |

| Sheet F | 1 | 2 | 3 | 4 | 5 | 6 | 7 | 8 | Final |
| (Colorado) Weldon / Franey | 0 | 0 | 1 | 0 | 3 | 0 | 2 | X | 6 |
| (Minnesota) Anderson-Heide / Richardson | 2 | 1 | 0 | 3 | 0 | 1 | 0 | X | 7 |

=== Draw 6 ===
Wednesday, February 19, 7:00 pm

| Sheet B | 1 | 2 | 3 | 4 | 5 | 6 | 7 | 8 | Final |
| (Minnesota) Daly / Violette | 1 | 0 | 0 | 1 | 2 | 0 | 2 | X | 6 |
| (Minnesota) Geving / Shuster | 0 | 1 | 1 | 0 | 0 | 1 | 0 | X | 3 |

| Sheet C | 1 | 2 | 3 | 4 | 5 | 6 | 7 | 8 | Final |
| (Colorado) Weldon / Franey | 1 | 0 | 0 | 1 | 0 | 0 | 2 | 1 | 5 |
| (Minnesota) Bear / Oldenburg | 0 | 1 | 2 | 0 | 1 | 2 | 0 | 0 | 6 |

| Sheet D | 1 | 2 | 3 | 4 | 5 | 6 | 7 | 8 | Final |
| (Wisconsin) Roth / Nernberger | 2 | 2 | 0 | 3 | 0 | 4 | X | X | 11 |
| (Colorado) Moores / Wheeler | 0 | 0 | 1 | 0 | 1 | 0 | X | X | 2 |

| Sheet E | 1 | 2 | 3 | 4 | 5 | 6 | 7 | 8 | Final |
| (Minnesota) Anderson-Heide / Richardson | 0 | 2 | 1 | 1 | 1 | 0 | 1 | 0 | 6 |
| (Wisconsin) Hamilton / Hamilton | 3 | 0 | 0 | 0 | 0 | 2 | 0 | 2 | 7 |

| Sheet F | 1 | 2 | 3 | 4 | 5 | 6 | 7 | 8 | Final |
| (Minnesota) Anderson / Stopera | 0 | 0 | 2 | 0 | 0 | 0 | X | X | 2 |
| (Minnesota) Thiesse / Dropkin | 2 | 1 | 0 | 2 | 1 | 2 | X | X | 8 |

=== Draw 7 ===
Thursday, February 20, 12:00 pm

| Sheet B | 1 | 2 | 3 | 4 | 5 | 6 | 7 | 8 | Final |
| (Colorado) Moores / Wheeler | 0 | 0 | 0 | 3 | 1 | 0 | 1 | X | 5 |
| (Minnesota) Anderson / Stopera | 1 | 1 | 1 | 0 | 0 | 4 | 0 | X | 7 |

| Sheet C | 1 | 2 | 3 | 4 | 5 | 6 | 7 | 8 | Final |
| (Minnesota) Anderson-Heide / Richardson | 1 | 0 | 4 | 0 | 1 | 0 | 1 | 0 | 7 |
| (Minnesota) Thiesse / Dropkin | 0 | 1 | 0 | 3 | 0 | 1 | 0 | 3 | 8 |

| Sheet D | 1 | 2 | 3 | 4 | 5 | 6 | 7 | 8 | Final |
| (Wisconsin) Hamilton / Hamilton | 1 | 0 | 1 | 0 | 2 | 1 | 0 | 2 | 7 |
| (Minnesota) Daly / Violette | 0 | 3 | 0 | 1 | 0 | 0 | 2 | 0 | 6 |

| Sheet E | 1 | 2 | 3 | 4 | 5 | 6 | 7 | 8 | Final |
| (Wisconsin) Roth / Nernberger | 1 | 1 | 0 | 2 | 2 | 0 | 1 | X | 7 |
| (Colorado) Weldon / Franey | 0 | 0 | 1 | 0 | 0 | 2 | 0 | X | 3 |

| Sheet F | 1 | 2 | 3 | 4 | 5 | 6 | 7 | 8 | Final |
| (Minnesota) Bear / Oldenburg | 2 | 0 | 0 | 0 | 0 | 1 | 0 | X | 3 |
| (Minnesota) Geving / Shuster | 0 | 1 | 4 | 1 | 1 | 0 | 4 | X | 11 |

=== Draw 8 ===
Thursday, February 20, 7:00 pm

| Sheet B | 1 | 2 | 3 | 4 | 5 | 6 | 7 | 8 | Final |
| (Minnesota) Thiesse / Dropkin | 1 | 0 | 3 | 0 | 2 | 0 | 1 | 0 | 7 |
| (Wisconsin) Roth / Nernberger | 0 | 1 | 0 | 1 | 0 | 3 | 0 | 1 | 6 |

| Sheet C | 1 | 2 | 3 | 4 | 5 | 6 | 7 | 8 | Final |
| (Minnesota) Geving / Shuster | 2 | 0 | 0 | 3 | 0 | 0 | 2 | 0 | 7 |
| (Wisconsin) Hamilton / Hamilton | 0 | 3 | 1 | 0 | 1 | 2 | 0 | 2 | 9 |

| Sheet D | 1 | 2 | 3 | 4 | 5 | 6 | 7 | 8 | Final |
| (Minnesota) Anderson / Stopera | 3 | 0 | 1 | 1 | 0 | 2 | 4 | X | 11 |
| (Colorado) Weldon / Franey | 0 | 1 | 0 | 0 | 2 | 0 | 0 | X | 3 |

| Sheet E | 1 | 2 | 3 | 4 | 5 | 6 | 7 | 8 | Final |
| (Minnesota) Bear / Oldenburg | 0 | 2 | 0 | 3 | 1 | 0 | 2 | X | 8 |
| (Minnesota) Daly / Violette | 1 | 0 | 2 | 0 | 0 | 1 | 0 | X | 4 |

| Sheet F | 1 | 2 | 3 | 4 | 5 | 6 | 7 | 8 | Final |
| (Minnesota) Anderson-Heide / Richardson | 1 | 0 | 0 | 3 | 1 | 1 | 1 | X | 7 |
| (Colorado) Moores / Wheeler | 0 | 1 | 2 | 0 | 0 | 0 | 0 | X | 3 |

=== Draw 9 ===
Friday, February 21, 9:00 am

| Sheet B | 1 | 2 | 3 | 4 | 5 | 6 | 7 | 8 | Final |
| (Wisconsin) Hamilton / Hamilton | 1 | 0 | 0 | 2 | 0 | 1 | 0 | X | 4 |
| (Minnesota) Bear / Oldenburg | 0 | 2 | 2 | 0 | 1 | 0 | 3 | X | 8 |

| Sheet C | 1 | 2 | 3 | 4 | 5 | 6 | 7 | 8 | Final |
| (Minnesota) Anderson / Stopera | 0 | 4 | 0 | 0 | 2 | 0 | 1 | 0 | 7 |
| (Wisconsin) Roth / Nernberger | 2 | 0 | 1 | 3 | 0 | 1 | 0 | 1 | 8 |

| Sheet D | 1 | 2 | 3 | 4 | 5 | 6 | 7 | 8 | Final |
| (Minnesota) Anderson-Heide / Richardson | 2 | 0 | 2 | 0 | 1 | 0 | 3 | 0 | 8 |
| (Minnesota) Geving / Shuster | 0 | 1 | 0 | 2 | 0 | 3 | 0 | 1 | 7 |

| Sheet E | 1 | 2 | 3 | 4 | 5 | 6 | 7 | 8 | Final |
| (Minnesota) Thiesse / Dropkin | 3 | 1 | 2 | 0 | 2 | 0 | 2 | X | 10 |
| (Colorado) Moores / Wheeler | 0 | 0 | 0 | 2 | 0 | 1 | 0 | X | 3 |

| Sheet F | 1 | 2 | 3 | 4 | 5 | 6 | 7 | 8 | Final |
| (Minnesota) Daly / Violette | 0 | 3 | 0 | 5 | 0 | 1 | 0 | 2 | 11 |
| (Colorado) Weldon / Franey | 1 | 0 | 5 | 0 | 1 | 0 | 3 | 0 | 10 |

== Tiebreaker ==
Friday, February 21, 1:00 pm

| Sheet E | 1 | 2 | 3 | 4 | 5 | 6 | 7 | 8 | Final |
| (Minnesota) Daly / Violette | 0 | 0 | 0 | 0 | 2 | 0 | 2 | 0 | 4 |
| (Minnesota) Anderson-Heide / Richardson | 1 | 1 | 1 | 1 | 0 | 1 | 0 | 2 | 7 |

== Playoffs ==
Page playoff system
1 | (Minnesota) Thiesse / Dropkin | 10
2 | (Minnesota) Anderson / Stopera | 3
3 | (Minnesota) Bear / Oldenburg | 10
4 | (Minnesota) Anderson-Heide / Richardson | 9

Semifinal
2 | (Minnesota) Anderson / Stopera | 7
3 | (Minnesota) Bear / Oldenburg | 5

Final
1 | (Minnesota) Thiesse / Dropkin | 8 | 6 | /
2 | (Minnesota) Anderson / Stopera | 7 | 3 | /

=== 1 vs. 2 ===
Friday, February 21, 7:00 pm

| Sheet B | 1 | 2 | 3 | 4 | 5 | 6 | 7 | 8 | Final |
| (Minnesota) Thiesse / Dropkin | 1 | 0 | 0 | 3 | 1 | 1 | 4 | X | 10 |
| (Minnesota) Anderson / Stopera | 0 | 1 | 2 | 0 | 0 | 0 | 0 | X | 3 |

=== 3 vs. 4 ===
Friday, February 21, 7:00 pm

| Sheet F | 1 | 2 | 3 | 4 | 5 | 6 | 7 | 8 | 9 | Final |
| (Minnesota) Bear / Oldenburg | 2 | 0 | 3 | 0 | 2 | 0 | 2 | 0 | 1 | 10 |
| (Minnesota) Anderson-Heide / Richardson | 0 | 3 | 0 | 2 | 0 | 3 | 0 | 1 | 0 | 9 |

=== Semifinal ===
Saturday, February 22, 12:00 pm

| Sheet B | 1 | 2 | 3 | 4 | 5 | 6 | 7 | 8 | Final |
| (Minnesota) Anderson / Stopera | 0 | 1 | 0 | 2 | 0 | 3 | 0 | 1 | 7 |
| (Minnesota) Bear / Oldenburg | 1 | 0 | 2 | 0 | 1 | 0 | 1 | 0 | 5 |

=== Final #1 ===
Saturday, February 22, 7:00 pm

| Team | 1 | 2 | 3 | 4 | 5 | 6 | 7 | 8 | 9 | Final |
| (Minnesota) Thiesse / Dropkin | 1 | 0 | 3 | 1 | 0 | 0 | 2 | 0 | 1 | 8 |
| (Minnesota) Anderson / Stopera | 0 | 2 | 0 | 0 | 2 | 1 | 0 | 2 | 0 | 7 |

=== Final #2 ===
Sunday, February 23, 12:00 pm

| Team | 1 | 2 | 3 | 4 | 5 | 6 | 7 | 8 | Final |
| (Minnesota) Thiesse / Dropkin | 1 | 2 | 1 | 0 | 1 | 1 | 0 | X | 6 |
| (Minnesota) Anderson / Stopera | 0 | 0 | 0 | 1 | 0 | 0 | 2 | X | 3 |

=== Final #3 ===
Sunday, February 23, 6:00 pm

| Team | 1 | 2 | 3 | 4 | 5 | 6 | 7 | 8 | Final |
| (Minnesota) Thiesse / Dropkin | | | | | | | | | 0 |
| (Minnesota) Anderson / Stopera | | | | | | | | | 0 |

- Not needed as Thiesse / Dropkin won the first two games of the best of 3 final
