= 2017 United States Olympic mixed doubles curling trials =

2017 United States mixed doubles curling Olympic trials
- Host city: Blaine, Minnesota
- Arena: Four Seasons Curling Club
- Dates: Dec.13-17
- Winner: (Wisconsin) Rebecca Hamilton / Matt Hamilton
- Finalist: (Minnesota) (Wisconsin) Cory Christensen / John Shuster

The 2017 United States mixed doubles curling Olympic trials were held from December 13–17 at the Four Seasons Curling Club in Blaine, Minnesota. The winner of this event was chosen to represent the United States at the 2018 Winter Olympics.

== Teams ==
The teams that competed were:

| Locale | Male | Female |
|---|---|---|
| Wisconsin / Minnesota | John Shuster | Cory Christensen |
| Wisconsin | Kroy Nernberger | Nina Roth |
| Minnesota | Jared Zezel | Vicky Persinger |
| Minnesota | Korey Dropkin | Jamie Sinclair |
| Minnesota / Washington | Derrick McLean | Alexandra Carlson |
| Wisconsin | Matt Hamilton | Rebecca Hamilton |
| Minnesota | Joe Polo | Tabitha Peterson |
| Minnesota | Jason Smith | Monica Walker |

== Round-robin standings ==
Final round-robin standings

Key
| Teams to playoffs |

| Team | W | L | PF | PA |
|---|---|---|---|---|
| (Minnesota) (Wisconsin) Christensen / Shuster | 6 | 1 | 59 | 34 |
| (Wisconsin) R.Hamilton / M. Hamilton | 5 | 2 | 52 | 44 |
| (Minnesota) Persinger / Zezel | 4 | 3 | 42 | 35 |
| (Wisconsin) Roth / Nernberger | 4 | 3 | 54 | 44 |
| (Minnesota) Walker / Smith | 3 | 4 | 44 | 44 |
| (Minnesota) Peterson / Polo | 3 | 4 | 38 | 53 |
| (Minnesota) Sinclair / Dropkin | 2 | 5 | 33 | 44 |
| (Minnesota) (Washington (state)) Carlson / McLean | 1 | 6 | 39 | 58 |

== Playoffs ==
Page playoff system
1 | (Minnesota) (Wisconsin) Christensen / Shuster | 3
2 | (Wisconsin) R. Hamilton / M. Hamilton | 6
3 | (Minnesota) Persinger / Zezel | 8
4 | (Wisconsin) Roth / Nernberger | 4

Semifinal
1 | (Minnesota) (Wisconsin) Christensen / Shuster | 7
3 | (Minnesota) Persinger / Zezel | 6

Final
2 | (Wisconsin) R. Hamilton / M. Hamilton | 6
1 | (Minnesota) (Wisconsin) Christensen / Shuster | 5

=== 1 vs. 2 ===
Saturday, December 15, 21:00

| Team | 1 | 2 | 3 | 4 | 5 | 6 | 7 | 8 | Final |
| (Minnesota) (Wisconsin) Christensen / Shuster | 0 | 1 | 1 | 0 | 0 | 1 | 0 | 0 | 3 |
| (Wisconsin) R. Hamilton / M. Hamilton | 1 | 0 | 0 | 1 | 1 | 0 | 1 | 2 | 6 |

=== 3 vs. 4 ===
Saturday, December 15, 21:00

| Team | 1 | 2 | 3 | 4 | 5 | 6 | 7 | 8 | Final |
| (Minnesota) Persinger / Zezel | 1 | 0 | 3 | 0 | 3 | 0 | 1 | X | 8 |
| (Wisconsin) Roth / Nernberger | 0 | 1 | 0 | 1 | 0 | 2 | 0 | X | 4 |

=== Semifinal ===
Sunday, December 16, 10:00

| Team | 1 | 2 | 3 | 4 | 5 | 6 | 7 | 8 | Final |
| (Minnesota) (Wisconsin) Christensen / Shuster | 2 | 0 | 2 | 0 | 0 | 0 | 2 | 1 | 7 |
| (Minnesota) Persinger / Zezel | 0 | 2 | 0 | 1 | 1 | 2 | 0 | 0 | 6 |

=== Final ===
Sunday, December 16, 15:00

| Team | 1 | 2 | 3 | 4 | 5 | 6 | 7 | 8 | Final |
| (Wisconsin) R. Hamilton / M. Hamilton | 1 | 1 | 0 | 1 | 0 | 2 | 1 | 0 | 6 |
| (Minnesota) (Wisconsin) Christensen / Shuster | 0 | 0 | 1 | 0 | 3 | 0 | 0 | 1 | 5 |
