= Andrew Stopera =

American curler (born 1997)

- Curler
- Born: September 30, 1997 (age 29); Briarcliff Manor, New York, U.S.

Team
- Curling club: Ardsley CC, Ardsley, NY
- Skip: John Shuster
- Third: Andrew Stopera
- Second: Mark Fenner
- Lead: Lance Wheeler
- Mixed doubles partner: Sarah Fenson

Curling career
- Member Association: United States
- World Championship: 1 (2025)
- Pan Continental Championship: 2 (2022, 2023)
Medal record
Men's curling
Representing United States
World Junior Championships
Silver medal – second place	2017 Gangneung
Pan Continental Curling Championships
Bronze medal – third place	2022 Calgary
Representing Minnesota
US Olympic Curling Trials
Silver medal – second place	2025 Lafayette	Mixed doubles
Bronze medal – third place	2021 Omaha	Men's
US Men's Championship
Gold medal – first place	2025 Duluth
Silver medal – second place	2024 East Rutherford
Silver medal – second place	2026 Charlotte
Bronze medal – third place	2023 Denver
US Mixed Doubles Championship
Silver medal – second place	2021 Wausau
Silver medal – second place	2022 Middleton
Silver medal – second place	2023 Kalamazoo
Bronze medal – third place	2026 Bemidji

Andrew Stopera (born September 30, 1997) is an American curler originally from Briarcliff Manor, New York. He currently is the third on Team John Shuster out of Duluth, Minnesota. He is a three-time United States Junior Champion and won the silver medal at the 2017 World Junior Championships. In men's play, Stopera also won the 2025 United States Men's Curling Championship.

== Career ==
=== Mens ===
Stopera had a prolific junior curling career, playing in the United States Junior Championships seven straight years, 2013–2019, and medaling every time. The first two seasons of his junior career Stopera played third for Scott Dunnam's team. They earned bronze at the 2013 Junior Nationals and improved to silver at the 2014 Junior Nationals.

Dunnam aged out of juniors after the 2013–14 season and Stopera joined the United States Curling Association's (USCA) Junior High Performance Program. Stopera was added to the Korey Dropkin rink at the lead position, joining Tom Howell, Mark Fenner, and alternate Luc Violette. Despite the new team, the result at the 2015 Junior Nationals was a familiar one, another silver medal. The team also competed in the United States Men's Championship, where they finished 7th. The next season, Stopera formed a new team, adding Luc Violette at third, Steven Szemple at second, and William Pryor at lead. The new lineup earned bronze at the 2016 Junior Nationals.

For the 2016–17 season, Team Stopera got a new front end, with Ben Richardson joining at second and Graem Fenson at lead. This line-up won the next three United States Junior Championships, 2017–2019. Winning Junior Nationals earned them the chance to represent the United States at the World Junior Championships. At their first appearance, the 2017 Worlds, they earned the silver medal when they lost to Lee Ki-jeong's South Korean team in the final. At the 2018 Worlds they made it to the bronze medal match but lost to Team Switzerland. Stopera finished fifth at his final Worlds in 2019.

Stopera played at the Winter University Games (WUG) twice as a junior, in 2017 and 2019. He played as alternate for Alex Leichter's team at the 2017 Games, finishing in sixth place. Two years later, Stopera returned to the WUG as skip but again came up short, finishing in eighth place.

After aging out of juniors Stopera joined Todd Birr's team for the 2019–20 season, playing third. For that season he also remained in the USCA's High Performance Program as a mixed doubles athlete competing with Madison Bear. For the 2020–21 season Stopera joined Rich Ruohonen's men's High Performance Program team as vice-skip. Stopera also was selected, along with teammate Madison Bear, to be the first U-25 mixed doubles national team. The U-25 team program, which stands for under 25 years old, was added in 2020 as a new part of the High Performance Program with the intention of bridging the development gap between juniors and adult-level curling.

Stopera joined forces with former junior teammates Dropkin, Howell, and Fenner during the 2022–23 season. The team had good success, winning a bronze medal at the 2022 Pan Continental Curling Championships, and finishing fourth in 2023. Stopera won his first men's national title at the 2025 United States Men's Curling Championship, representing USA at the 2025 World Men's Curling Championship. At the 2025 Worlds, the team went 4-8 after the round robin, finishing a disappointing 11th place.

=== Mixed Doubles ===
Stopera played mixed doubles with Madison Bear, where after finishing the round robin undefeated, the pair finished in 2nd at the 2021 United States Mixed Doubles Curling Championship, losing to Vicky Persinger and Chris Plys 8–5 in the final. Stopera then played with Monica Walker for one season, where they also finished second at the national championship, this time losing to Becca Hamilton and Matt Hamilton 9–3 in the final.

Stopera started playing mixed doubles with Sarah Anderson in the 2022–23 curling season, where in their first year together, Stopera would get the silver medal again at the 2023 United States Mixed Doubles Curling Championship, losing to Cory Thiesse and men's teammate Korey Dropkin in the final. Anderson and Stopera then won the 2024 United States Mixed Doubles Olympic Pre-Trials, qualifying them for the 2025 United States Mixed Doubles Curling Olympic Trials. At the US Olympic Trials, Anderson and Stopera went 7–2 in the round robin, and lost to Thiesse and Dropkin in a best of three games final to finish 2nd.

== Personal life ==
Stopera's father Bill is also a curler, and won the United States Men's Championship in 2012. Stopera graduated from Northwestern University. He currently works in insurance and resides in Richfield, Minnesota.

== Teams ==
=== Men's ===
Season	Skip	Third	Second	Lead	Alternate	Coach	Events
2012–13	Scott Dunnam	Andrew Stopera	Steven Szemple	Andrew Dunnam			2013 USJCC (bronze)
2013–14	Scott Dunnam	Andrew Stopera	Steven Szemple	Andrew Dunnam			2014 USJCC (silver)
2014–15	Korey Dropkin	Tom Howell	Mark Fenner	Andrew Stopera	Luc Violette		2015 USJCC (silver); 2015 USMCC (7th)
2015–16	Andrew Stopera	Luc Violette	Steven Szemple	William Pryor			2016 USJCC (bronze)
2015–16	Heath McCormick	Bill Stopera	Dean Gemmell	Mark Lazar	Andrew Stopera		2016 USMCC (10th)
2016–17	Andrew Stopera	Luc Violette	Ben Richardson	Graem Fenson		Mark Lazar	2017 USJCC (gold); 2017 WJCC (silver)
2016–17	Alex Leichter	Nate Clark	Chris Bond	Calvin Weber	Andrew Stopera	Frederick Leichter	2017 WUG (6th)
2017–18	Andrew Stopera	Luc Violette	Ben Richardson	Graem Fenson	Caleb Clawson	Mark Lazar	2018 USJCC (gold); 2018 WJCC (4th)
2018–19	Andrew Stopera	Luc Violette	Ben Richardson	Graem Fenson	Riley Fenson	Mark Lazar	2019 USJCC (gold); 2019 WJCC (5th)
2018–19	Andrew Stopera	Luc Violette	Alex Fenson	Graem Fenson		Mark Lazar	2019 WUG (8th)
2019–20	Todd Birr	Andrew Stopera	Hunter Clawson	Tom O'Connor			2020 USMCC (8th)
2020–21	Rich Ruohonen	Andrew Stopera	Colin Hufman	Kroy Nernberger	Philip Tilker	Pete Annis	2021 USMCC (7th)
2021–22	Rich Ruohonen	Andrew Stopera	Colin Hufman	Philip Tilker	Kroy Nernberger	Pete Annis	2021 USOCT (bronze)
2022–23	Korey Dropkin	Andrew Stopera	Mark Fenner	Tom Howell		Mark Lazar	2022 PCCC (bronze); 2023 USMCC (bronze)
2023–24	Korey Dropkin (Fourth)	Andrew Stopera (Skip)	Mark Fenner	Tom Howell		Mark Lazar	2023 PCCC (4th); 2024 USMCC (silver)
2024–25	Korey Dropkin	Tom Howell	Andrew Stopera	Mark Fenner	Chris Plys (WMCC)	Mark Lazar	2025 USMCC (gold); 2025 WMCC (11th)
2025	Korey Dropkin	Tom Howell	Andrew Stopera	Mark Fenner		Mark Lazar	
2025–26	Andrew Stopera	Tom Howell	Mark Fenner	Lance Wheeler		Mark Lazar	2026 USMCC (silver)
2026–27	John Shuster	Andrew Stopera	Mark Fenner	Lance Wheeler		Mark Lazar	

=== Mixed doubles ===
Season	Female	Male	Events
2019–20	Madison Bear	Andrew Stopera	2020 USMDCC (8th)
2020–21	Madison Bear	Andrew Stopera	2021 USMDCC (silver)
2021–22	Madison Bear	Andrew Stopera	2021 USMDOT (9th)
2021–22	Monica Walker	Andrew Stopera	2022 USMDCC (silver)
2022–23	Sarah Anderson	Andrew Stopera	2023 USMDCC (silver)
2023–24	Sarah Anderson	Andrew Stopera	2024 USMDCC (7th)
2024–25	Sarah Anderson	Andrew Stopera	2025 USMDOT (silver)
2025–26	Sarah Fenson	Andrew Stopera	2026 USMDCC (bronze)

== Grand Slam record ==
Key
C	Champion
F	Lost in Final
SF	Lost in Semifinal
QF	Lost in Quarterfinals
R16	Lost in the round of 16
Q	Did not advance to playoffs
T2	Played in Tier 2 event
DNP	Did not participate in event
N/A	Not a Grand Slam event that season

Event	2018–19	2019–20	2020–21	2021–22	2022–23	2023–24	2024–25	2025–26	2026–27
Invitational	T2	DNP	N/A	N/A	T2	Q	Q	Q	DNP
Masters	DNP	DNP	N/A	Q	Q	Q	QF	Q	DNP
National	DNP	DNP	N/A	DNP	SF	QF	DNP	DNP	
Open	DNP	DNP	N/A	N/A	QF	Q	DNP	T2	DNP
Players'	DNP	N/A	DNP	DNP	Q	DNP	Q	DNP	
Champions Cup	DNP	N/A	DNP	DNP	QF	N/A	N/A	N/A	N/A
