= 2016 United States Mixed Doubles Curling Championship =

Mixed doubles curling tournament held in the United States

- Host city: Denver, Colorado
- Arena: Denver Curling Club
- Dates: December 2-7, 2015
- Winner: Jessica Schultz and Jason Smith

The 2016 United States Mixed Doubles Curling Championship was held from December 2-7, 2015 at the Denver Curling Club in Denver, Colorado. Jason Smith and Jessica Schultz, both from Minnesota, won the tournament. The champions, along with the silver and bronze medal winners, earned a spot in the United States Mixed Doubles World Trials in February 2016, where the U.S. representative for the 2016 World Mixed Doubles Curling Championship in Karlstad, Sweden was decided.

== Teams ==
Twenty nine teams qualified to compete in the championship.

| Female | Male | State(s) |
|---|---|---|
| Taylor Anderson | Alex Fenson | Minnesota |
| Danielle Buchbinder | Michael Rupp | New York |
| Cristin Clark | Brady Clark | Washington |
| Stephanie Senneker | Bret Jackson | Michigan |
| Christon Clark | Logan Tingley | Indiana, Ohio |
| Becca Wood | Brett Davis | Colorado |
| Frances Walsh | Stephen Grant | Washington |
| Emily Good | MacAllan Guy | Washington |
| Jessica Schultz | Jason Smith | Minnesota |
| Keri VanNorman | Cameron Kim | California |
| Dena Rosenberry | Darrick Kizlyk | Colorado |
| Tracy Heuermann | Ron Kloth | Arizona |
| Alexandra Carlson | Alex Leichter | Minnesota, Massachusetts |
| Jenny Levy | Ben Levy | Michigan |
| Kathy Jackson | Murray Jackson | North Carolina |
| Jillian Walker | Derrick McLean | Washington |
| Nina Roth | Kroy Nernberger | Wisconsin |
| Teri Olson | Scott Olson | Massachusetts |
| Kelsey Ostrowski | Gary Mazzotta | Minnesota |
| Catharine Persinger | Greg Persinger | Alaska |
| Allison Pottinger | Doug Pottinger | Minnesota |
| Cynthia Smith | Matthew Culbertson | Colorado |
| Elaine Smith-Koop | Joshua Engle | Oregon |
| Maureen Stolt | Peter Stolt | Minnesota |
| Larissa Unruh | Samuel Unruh | North Dakota |
| Nicole Vassar | Sam Williams | Massachusetts |
| Monica Walker | Sean Beighton | Massachusetts, Washington |
| Sarah Thuriot | Doug Weimerskirch | Minnesota |
| Stephanie Martin | Dan Wiza | Illinois, Wisconsin |

== Competition ==
=== Format ===
Instead of the usual round robin group play leading into playoffs, the 2016 Championship was structured with three tiers of brackets to create a triple elimination tournament. All 29 teams began in the A event bracket, if they lost they moved down to the B event bracket and if they lost again they moved to the C event bracket. If a team lost a game in the C event they were eliminated from the tournament. The winners of the A and B brackets played for the championship. However, all three bracket winners qualified for the US World Trials to compete to represent the United States at the 2016 World Mixed Doubles Championship.

=== A event bracket ===
Round 1
Martin/Wiza | 7
Levy/Levy | 3
Leichter/Carlson | 6
Smith-Koop/Engle | 4
Persinger/Persinger | 9
Culbertson/Smith | 1
Nernberger/Roth | 15
Kim/VanNorman | 1
Olson/Olson | 8
Unruh/Unruh | 10
Anderson/Fenson | 7
Kloth/Heuermann | 3
Good/Guy | 9
Davis/Wood | 2
Williams/Vassar | 6
Weimerskirch/Thuriot | 3
Walker/Beighton | 13
Clark/Tingley | 1
McLean/Walker | 6
Grant/Walsh | 4
Jackson/Senneker | 18
Ostrowski/Mazzotta | 4
Smith/Schultz | 10
Jackson/Jackson | 4
Kizlyk/Rosenberry | 7
Buchbinder/Rupp | 3

Round 2
Martin/Wiza | 6
Clark/Clark | 8
Leichter/Carlson | 8
Persinger/Persinger | 7
Nernberger/Roth | 9
Unruh/Unruh | 3
Anderson/Fenson | 12
Good/Guy | 5
Williams/Vassar | 3
Pottinger/Pottinger | 8
Walker/Beighton | 4
McLean/Walker | 7
Jackson/Senneker | 6
Stolt/Stolt | 7
Smith/Schultz | 11
Kizlyk/Rosenberry | 2

Round 3
Clark/Clark | 4
Leichter/Carlson | 6
Nernberger/Roth | 12
Anderson/Fenson | 10
Pottinger/Pottinger | 10
McLean/Walker | 4
Stolt/Stolt | 7
Smith/Schultz | 10

Round 4
Leichter/Carlson | 7
Nernberger/Roth | 6
Pottinger/Pottinger | 4
Smith/Schultz | 10

Round 5
Leichter/Carlson | 6
Smith/Schultz | 7

=== Finals ===
The winners of the A and B brackets played for the championship.

Monday, December 7, 11:00 am MT

| Team | 1 | 2 | 3 | 4 | 5 | 6 | 7 | 8 | Final |
| Smith/Schultz | 0 | 3 | 3 | 1 | 1 | 0 | 1 | X | 9 |
| Pottinger/Pottinger 🔨 | 2 | 0 | 0 | 0 | 0 | 1 | 0 | X | 3 |
