= 2015 World Senior Curling Championships – Women's tournament =

2015 World Senior Curling Championships Women's tournament
- Host city: Sochi, Russia
- Arena: Iceberg Skating Palace
- Dates: April 18–25
- Winner: Canada
- Curling club: Brandon CC, Brandon
- Skip: Lois Fowler
- Third: Maureen Bonar
- Second: Cathy Gauthier
- Lead: Allyson Stewart
- Finalist: Italy (Fiona Grace Simpson)

The women's tournament of the 2015 World Senior Curling Championships was held from April 18 to 25 at the Iceberg Skating Palace in Sochi, Russia.

== Teams ==
The teams are listed as follows:

=== Group A ===
Czech Republic	Finland	Japan	Russia
Skip: Ivana Kubešková; Third: Veronika Neznalová; Second: Anna Candrová; Lead: Michaela Čiháková; Alternate: Michaela Měchurová	Skip: Kirsti Kauste; Third: Tuula Merentie; Second: Riitta-Liisa Harnalainen; Lead: Kristina Nokelainen	Skip: Shizuko Funaki; Third: Chizuko Hamadate; Second: Katsuko Matsui; Lead: Tsuyako Yokouchi	Skip: Tatiana Smirnova; Third: Irina Kolesnikova; Second: Natalia Ilenkova; Lead: Liudmila Murova; Alternate: Ekaterina Priemskaja
Scotland	Sweden	Switzerland	
Skip: Barbara Gibb; Third: Carol Scott; Second: Elinor Ritchie; Lead: Margaret Archer; Alternate: Judith Carr	Skip: Gunilla Arfwidsson Edlund; Third: Eva Olofsson; Second: Karin Osterberg; Lead: Haide Stensson; Alternate: Karin Liljegren	Skip: Susan Limena; Third: Sandra Zimmermann; Second: Monika Kehrli; Lead: Lucy Ebner; Alternate: Erika Wohlmann	

=== Group B ===
Canada	England	Italy
Skip: Lois Fowler; Third: Maureen Bonar; Second: Cathy Gauthier; Lead: Allyson Stewart	Skip: Judith Dixon; Third: Joan Reed; Second: Valerie Saville; Lead: Deborah Higgins	Skip: Fiona Grace Simpson; Third: Grazia Ferrero; Second: Fulvia Tiboldo; Lead: Vittoria Santini
New Zealand	Slovakia	United States
Skip: Wendy Becker; Third: Elizabeth Matthews; Second: Glenys Taylor; Lead: Christine Bewick	Fourth: Elena Jančaříková; Third: Mária Liptáková; Skip: Margita Matuškovičová; Lead: Antónia Špiláková	Skip: Norma O'Leary; Third: Linda Christensen; Second: Mary Shields; Lead: Lucy DeVore; Alternate: Shelley Dropkin

== Round-robin standings ==
Final round-robin standings

Key
Teams to Playoffs
Teams to Tiebreaker

Group A	Skip	W	L
Sweden	Gunilla Arfwidsson Edlund	5	1
Finland	Kirsti Kauste	4	2
Switzerland	Susan Limena	4	2
Czech Republic	Ivana Kubešková	3	3
Scotland	Barbara Gibb	3	3
Japan	Shizuko Funaki	1	5
Russia	Tatiana Smirnova	1	5

Group B	Skip	W	L
United States	Norma O'Leary	5	0
Canada	Lois Fowler	4	1
England	Judith Dixon	2	3
Italy	Fiona Grace Simpson	2	3
New Zealand	Wendy Becker	2	3
Slovakia	Margita Matuškovičová	0	5

== Round-robin results ==
=== Group A ===
==== Saturday, April 18 ====
Draw 1 8:00

Sheet D	1	2	3	4	5	6	7	8	Final
Finland (Kauste)	1	0	0	2	4	0	0	1	8
Switzerland (Limena)	0	3	1	0	0	2	1	0	7

Draw 3 17:00

Sheet D	1	2	3	4	5	6	7	8	Final
Japan (Funaki)	1	0	2	2	1	0	1	X	7
Scotland (Gibb)	0	2	0	0	0	1	0	X	3

Draw 4 20:45

Sheet D	1	2	3	4	5	6	7	8	Final
Russia (Smirnova)	0	1	0	0	2	1	0	X	4
Sweden (Edlund)	5	0	1	1	0	0	2	X	9

==== Sunday, April 19 ====
Draw 7 16:00

Sheet A	1	2	3	4	5	6	7	8	Final
Scotland (Gibb)	1	0	0	4	1	1	2	X	9
Russia (Smirnova)	0	1	1	0	0	0	0	X	2

Sheet B	1	2	3	4	5	6	7	8	Final
Sweden (Edlund)	0	3	2	2	5	2	X	X	14
Finland (Kauste)	1	0	0	0	0	0	X	X	1

Sheet C	1	2	3	4	5	6	7	8	Final
Switzerland (Limena)	0	3	0	2	0	3	0	X	8
Czech Republic (Kubešková)	1	0	1	0	2	0	1	X	5

==== Monday, April 20 ====
Draw 9 8:00

Sheet A	1	2	3	4	5	6	7	8	9	Final
Czech Republic (Kubešková)	0	0	2	2	2	0	0	2	1	9
Sweden (Edlund)	2	2	0	0	0	1	3	0	0	8

Sheet B	1	2	3	4	5	6	7	8	Final
Russia (Smirnova)	0	1	0	0	3	0	3	1	8
Japan (Funaki)	1	0	3	2	0	1	0	0	7

Sheet C	1	2	3	4	5	6	7	8	Final
Finland (Kauste)	2	0	0	0	2	0	2	0	6
Scotland (Gibb)	0	2	1	1	0	1	0	2	7

Draw 11 16:00

Sheet A	1	2	3	4	5	6	7	8	Final
Japan (Funaki)	2	0	1	0	1	0	1	0	5
Finland (Kauste)	0	1	0	2	0	3	0	1	7

Sheet B	1	2	3	4	5	6	7	8	Final
Scotland (Gibb)	2	0	3	1	0	1	1	1	9
Czech Republic (Kubešková)	0	3	0	0	2	0	0	0	5

Sheet E	1	2	3	4	5	6	7	8	Final
Sweden (Edlund)	0	2	2	3	0	1	1	X	9
Switzerland (Limena)	3	0	0	0	1	0	0	X	4

==== Tuesday, April 21 ====
Draw 14 12:00

Sheet E	1	2	3	4	5	6	7	8	Final
Czech Republic (Kubešková)	3	1	0	0	1	0	1	1	7
Japan (Funaki)	0	0	2	1	0	1	0	0	4

Draw 16 20:00

Sheet A	1	2	3	4	5	6	7	8	Final
Switzerland (Limena)	2	1	0	1	0	1	1	X	6
Scotland (Gibb)	0	0	1	0	1	0	0	X	2

Sheet E	1	2	3	4	5	6	7	8	Final
Finland (Kauste)	3	1	0	1	0	1	0	1	7
Russia (Smirnova)	0	0	3	0	1	0	2	0	6

==== Wednesday, April 22 ====
Draw 18 12:00

Sheet A	1	2	3	4	5	6	7	8	Final
Russia (Smirnova)	0	1	0	0	1	0	0	X	2
Czech Republic (Kubešková)	2	0	2	1	0	2	3	X	10

Draw 19 16:00

Sheet C	1	2	3	4	5	6	7	8	Final
Scotland (Gibb)	0	2	0	0	2	0	1	X	5
Sweden (Edlund)	3	0	2	1	0	2	0	X	8

Draw 20 20:00

Sheet C	1	2	3	4	5	6	7	8	Final
Japan (Funaki)	1	0	0	2	1	0	3	0	7
Switzerland (Limena)	0	3	1	0	0	4	0	1	9

==== Thursday, April 23 ====
Draw 21 8:00

Sheet D	1	2	3	4	5	6	7	8	Final
Czech Republic (Kubešková)	0	1	0	1	2	0	1	0	5
Finland (Kauste)	1	0	2	0	0	1	0	2	6

Draw 23 16:00

Sheet A	1	2	3	4	5	6	7	8	Final
Sweden (Edlund)	1	0	1	1	1	0	0	1	5
Japan (Funaki)	0	1	0	0	0	1	2	0	4

Sheet B	1	2	3	4	5	6	7	8	Final
Switzerland (Limena)	0	2	2	0	1	2	1	X	8
Russia (Smirnova)	1	0	0	1	0	0	0	X	2

=== Group B ===
==== Saturday, April 18 ====
Draw 2 13:15

Sheet A	1	2	3	4	5	6	7	8	Final
Canada (Fowler)	1	0	1	1	6	2	X	X	11
Italy (Simpson)	0	1	0	0	0	0	X	X	1

Sheet B	1	2	3	4	5	6	7	8	Final
England (Dixon)	1	1	0	2	2	0	2	0	8
Slovakia (Matuškovičová)	0	0	2	0	0	3	0	1	6

Sheet C	1	2	3	4	5	6	7	8	Final
United States (O'Leary)	3	1	1	1	0	4	0	X	10
New Zealand (Becker)	0	0	0	0	3	0	2	X	5

==== Sunday, April 19 ====
Draw 8 20:00

Sheet A	1	2	3	4	5	6	7	8	Final
Slovakia (Matuškovičová)	0	0	1	0	3	0	1	X	5
United States (O'Leary)	1	3	0	2	0	2	0	X	8

Sheet B	1	2	3	4	5	6	7	8	Final
Canada (Fowler)	1	2	2	0	4	2	X	X	11
New Zealand (Becker)	0	0	0	1	0	0	X	X	1

Sheet C	1	2	3	4	5	6	7	8	Final
England (Dixon)	0	0	4	0	1	0	0	X	5
Italy (Simpson)	1	2	0	4	0	2	1	X	10

==== Tuesday, April 21 ====
Draw 13 8:00

Sheet E	1	2	3	4	5	6	7	8	Final
Canada (Fowler)	1	0	1	2	0	4	2	X	10
England (Dixon)	0	1	0	0	1	0	0	X	2

Draw 14 12:00

Sheet B	1	2	3	4	5	6	7	8	Final
United States (O'Leary)	2	0	3	0	0	1	3	X	9
Italy (Simpson)	0	1	0	1	1	0	0	X	3

Sheet D	1	2	3	4	5	6	7	8	Final
New Zealand (Becker)	0	0	1	0	1	5	3	X	10
Slovakia (Matuškovičová)	1	1	0	3	0	0	0	X	5

==== Wednesday, April 22 ====
Draw 17 8:00

Sheet A	1	2	3	4	5	6	7	8	Final
New Zealand (Becker)	0	1	0	4	0	1	0	X	6
England (Dixon)	2	0	1	0	6	0	1	X	10

Sheet D	1	2	3	4	5	6	7	8	Final
United States (O'Leary)	0	1	0	1	1	0	2	1	6
Canada (Fowler)	1	0	2	0	0	2	0	0	5

Sheet E	1	2	3	4	5	6	7	8	Final
Italy (Simpson)	2	1	2	3	0	2	X	X	10
Slovakia (Matuškovičová)	0	0	0	0	1	0	X	X	1

==== Thursday, April 23 ====
Draw 23 16:00

Sheet C	1	2	3	4	5	6	7	8	Final
Slovakia (Matuškovičová)	0	1	1	0	0	1	X	X	3
Canada (Fowler)	4	0	0	4	4	0	X	X	12

Sheet D	1	2	3	4	5	6	7	8	Final
Italy (Simpson)	0	0	1	0	2	0	1	0	4
New Zealand (Becker)	1	1	0	1	0	2	0	1	6

Sheet E	1	2	3	4	5	6	7	8	Final
England (Dixon)	0	2	0	0	0	0	0	X	2
United States (O'Leary)	1	0	3	1	1	1	5	X	12

== Tiebreaker ==
Friday, April 24, 9:00

Sheet B	1	2	3	4	5	6	7	8	Final
England (Dixon)	0	0	1	1	1	0	0	X	3
Italy (Simpson)	1	3	0	0	0	1	1	X	6

== Playoffs ==
Quarterfinals
B2	Canada	5
A3	Switzerland	2
A2	Finland	3
B3	Italy	9

Semifinals
A1	Sweden	2
B2	Canada	11
B1	United States	6
B3	Italy	7

Final
B2	Canada	6
B3	Italy	2

Bronze Medal Game
A1	Sweden	4
B1	United States	6

=== Quarterfinals ===
Friday, April 24, 14:00

Sheet A	1	2	3	4	5	6	7	8	Final
Canada (Fowler)	1	0	1	0	2	0	1	X	5
Switzerland (Limena)	0	0	0	1	0	1	0	X	2

Sheet C	1	2	3	4	5	6	7	8	Final
Finland (Kauste)	0	1	0	0	2	0	0	X	3
Italy (Simpson)	3	0	2	2	0	1	1	X	9

=== Semifinals ===
Saturday, April 25, 8:00

Sheet D	1	2	3	4	5	6	7	8	Final
Sweden (Edlund)	0	1	0	1	0	0	0	X	2
Canada (Fowler)	3	0	3	0	3	1	1	X	11

Sheet B	1	2	3	4	5	6	7	8	Final
United States (O'Leary)	0	1	0	0	1	0	4	0	6
Italy (Simpson)	2	0	1	1	0	2	0	1	7

=== Bronze medal game ===
Saturday, April 25, 13:00

Team	1	2	3	4	5	6	7	8	Final
United States (O'Leary)	1	1	0	1	2	0	1	0	6
Sweden (Edlund)	0	0	1	0	0	2	0	1	4

=== Gold medal game ===
Saturday, April 25, 13:00

Team	1	2	3	4	5	6	7	8	Final
Italy (Simpson)	0	1	0	1	0	0	0	X	2
Canada (Fowler)	2	0	2	0	0	1	1	X	6
