= 2024 United States Mixed Doubles Curling Championship =

- Host city: Traverse City, Michigan
- Arena: Traverse City Curling Club
- Dates: February 27 – March 3
- Winner: (Wisconsin) B. Hamilton / M. Hamilton
- Female: Becca Hamilton
- Male: Matt Hamilton
- Finalist: (Minnesota) Thiesse / Dropkin

The 2024 United States Mixed Doubles Curling Championship was held from February 27 to March 3, 2024, at the Traverse City Curling Club in Traverse City, Michigan. The championship featured sixteen teams, split into two pools of eight teams. After a round-robin within each pool, the top three teams from each pool advanced to a single-elimination playoff bracket.

The winning pair of Becca and Matt Hamilton represented the United States at the 2024 World Mixed Doubles Curling Championship in Östersund, Sweden, finishing in 10th place.

== Teams ==
The teams are listed as follows:

Female	Male	Locale
Sarah Anderson	Andrew Stopera	Minneapolis, Minnesota
Taylor Anderson	Ben Richardson	Chaska, Minnesota
Madison Bear	Aidan Oldenburg	Chaska, Minnesota
Regan Birr	Todd Birr	Blaine Minnesota
Cora Farrell	Coleman Thurston	Chaska, Minnesota
Aileen Geving	John Shuster	Duluth, Minnesota
Becca Hamilton	Matt Hamilton	McFarland, Wisconsin
Clare Moores	Lance Wheeler	Denver, Colorado
Kirstin Nickel	Gabriel Nickel	Hudson, Wisconsin
Vicky Persinger	Daniel Casper	Fairbanks, Alaska
Ann Podoll	Nate Parry	Fargo, North Dakota
Kim Rhyme	Jason Smith	Minneapolis, Minnesota
Emily Schweitzer	Blake Hagberg	Minneapolis, Minnesota
Cory Thiesse	Korey Dropkin	Duluth, Minnesota
BriAnna Weldon	Sean Franey	Denver, Colorado
Rebecca Wood	Tony Kot	Denver, Colorado

== Round robin standings ==
Final round robin standings

Key
Teams to Playoffs
Teams to Tiebreaker

Pool A	W	L
(Minnesota) Thiesse / Dropkin	7	0
(Minnesota) Rhyme / Smith	5	2
(Alaska) Persinger / Casper	5	2
(Minnesota) Farrell / Thurston	4	3
(Colorado) Moores / Wheeler	4	3
(Minnesota) Schweitzer / Hagberg	2	5
(Colorado) Wood / Kot	1	6
(Wisconsin) K. Nickel / G. Nickel	0	7

Pool B	W	L
(Minnesota) T. Anderson / Richardson	5	2
(Minnesota) Geving / Shuster	5	2
(Wisconsin) B. Hamilton / M. Hamilton	5	2
(Minnesota) S. Anderson / Stopera	5	2
(Minnesota) Bear / Oldenburg	4	3
(North Dakota) Podoll / Parry	2	5
(Colorado) Weldon / Franey	2	5
(Minnesota) R. Birr / T. Birr	0	7

== Round robin results ==
All draws are listed in Eastern Standard Time (UTC−05:00).

=== Draw 1 ===
Tuesday, February 27, 7:30 pm

Sheet B	1	2	3	4	5	6	7	8	Final
(Minnesota) Farrell / Thurston	1	2	0	1	0	2	0	0	6
(Minnesota) Rhyme / Smith	0	0	3	0	3	0	2	1	9

Sheet C	1	2	3	4	5	6	7	8	Final
(Alaska) Persinger / Casper	2	0	3	1	0	0	0	1	7
(Minnesota) Schweitzer / Hagberg	0	2	0	0	1	2	1	0	6

Sheet D	1	2	3	4	5	6	7	8	Final
(Colorado) Moores / Wheeler	2	0	1	1	3	0	4	X	11
(Colorado) Wood / Kot	0	1	0	0	0	1	0	X	2

Sheet E	1	2	3	4	5	6	7	8	Final
(Minnesota) Thiesse / Dropkin	1	3	2	0	3	1	3	X	13
(Wisconsin) K. Nickel / G. Nickel	0	0	0	4	0	0	0	X	4

=== Draw 2 ===
Wednesday, February 28, 9:00 am

Sheet B	1	2	3	4	5	6	7	8	Final
(Minnesota) T. Anderson / Richardson	1	1	1	1	0	1	1	X	6
(Minnesota) Bear / Oldenburg	0	0	0	0	1	0	0	X	1

Sheet C	1	2	3	4	5	6	7	8	Final
(Minnesota) Geving / Shuster	0	0	4	0	3	5	X	X	12
(Minnesota) R. Birr / T. Birr	1	1	0	1	0	0	X	X	3

Sheet D	1	2	3	4	5	6	7	8	Final
(Wisconsin) B. Hamilton / M. Hamilton	2	2	0	2	0	1	1	X	8
(Colorado) Weldon / Franey	0	0	1	0	3	0	0	X	4

Sheet E	1	2	3	4	5	6	7	8	Final
(Minnesota) S. Anderson / Stopera	1	0	0	5	0	1	0	1	8
(North Dakota) Podoll / Parry	0	1	1	0	3	0	1	0	6

=== Draw 3 ===
Wednesday, February 28, 12:30 pm

Sheet B	1	2	3	4	5	6	7	8	Final
(Colorado) Wood / Kot	1	0	0	0	0	1	0	X	2
(Minnesota) Schweitzer / Hagberg	0	3	1	1	1	0	3	X	9

Sheet C	1	2	3	4	5	6	7	8	Final
(Minnesota) Rhyme / Smith	4	0	1	1	0	1	1	X	8
(Wisconsin) K. Nickel / G. Nickel	0	3	0	0	1	0	0	X	4

Sheet D	1	2	3	4	5	6	7	8	Final
(Minnesota) Farrell / Thurston	0	0	0	0	2	0	0	X	2
(Minnesota) Thiesse / Dropkin	1	1	1	2	0	1	1	X	7

Sheet E	1	2	3	4	5	6	7	8	Final
(Alaska) Persinger / Casper	1	1	0	0	1	1	1	2	7
(Colorado) Moores / Wheeler	0	0	1	1	0	0	0	0	2

=== Draw 4 ===
Wednesday, February 28, 4:00 pm

Sheet B	1	2	3	4	5	6	7	8	Final
(Colorado) Weldon / Franey	1	2	0	4	0	1	1	X	9
(Minnesota) R. Birr / T. Birr	0	0	3	0	2	0	0	X	5

Sheet C	1	2	3	4	5	6	7	8	Final
(Minnesota) Bear / Oldenburg	0	1	1	0	2	0	2	1	7
(North Dakota) Podoll / Parry	1	0	0	1	0	1	0	0	3

Sheet D	1	2	3	4	5	6	7	8	Final
(Minnesota) T. Anderson / Richardson	0	1	0	0	1	1	0	X	4
(Minnesota) S. Anderson / Stopera	2	0	1	1	0	0	4	X	8

Sheet E	1	2	3	4	5	6	7	8	Final
(Minnesota) Geving / Shuster	3	1	1	0	1	0	0	1	7
(Wisconsin) B. Hamilton / M. Hamilton	0	0	0	2	0	2	1	0	5

=== Draw 5 ===
Wednesday, February 28, 7:30 pm

Sheet B	1	2	3	4	5	6	7	8	Final
(Colorado) Moores / Wheeler	0	0	2	0	0	2	1	0	5
(Minnesota) Farrell / Thurston	1	1	0	1	2	0	0	1	6

Sheet C	1	2	3	4	5	6	7	8	Final
(Minnesota) Schweitzer / Hagberg	0	0	0	0	0	1	X	X	1
(Minnesota) Thiesse / Dropkin	2	2	3	1	1	0	X	X	9

Sheet D	1	2	3	4	5	6	7	8	Final
(Alaska) Persinger / Casper	1	2	0	4	0	1	3	X	11
(Wisconsin) K. Nickel / G. Nickel	0	0	1	0	4	0	0	X	5

Sheet E	1	2	3	4	5	6	7	8	9	Final
(Minnesota) Rhyme / Smith	0	0	2	0	3	0	0	1	2	8
(Colorado) Wood / Kot	1	1	0	2	0	1	1	0	0	6

=== Draw 6 ===
Thursday, February 29, 9:00 am

Sheet B	1	2	3	4	5	6	7	8	Final
(Wisconsin) B. Hamilton / M. Hamilton	1	0	0	3	1	1	0	X	6
(Minnesota) T. Anderson / Richardson	0	5	1	0	0	0	4	X	10

Sheet C	1	2	3	4	5	6	7	8	Final
(Minnesota) R. Birr / T. Birr	0	0	0	0	3	0	X	X	3
(Minnesota) S. Anderson / Stopera	2	4	2	1	0	1	X	X	10

Sheet D	1	2	3	4	5	6	7	8	Final
(Minnesota) Geving / Shuster	2	1	0	3	0	1	1	X	8
(North Dakota) Podoll / Parry	0	0	2	0	1	0	0	X	3

Sheet E	1	2	3	4	5	6	7	8	Final
(Minnesota) Bear / Oldenburg	0	2	0	1	3	0	3	2	11
(Colorado) Weldon / Franey	2	0	2	0	0	2	0	0	6

=== Draw 7 ===
Thursday, February 29, 2:00 pm

Sheet B	1	2	3	4	5	6	7	8	Final
(Alaska) Persinger / Casper	0	0	1	1	0	0	X	X	2
(Minnesota) Thiesse / Dropkin	3	1	0	0	3	1	X	X	8

Sheet C	1	2	3	4	5	6	7	8	Final
(Colorado) Moores / Wheeler	0	2	0	1	1	1	1	X	6
(Minnesota) Rhyme / Smith	1	0	2	0	0	0	0	X	3

Sheet D	1	2	3	4	5	6	7	8	Final
(Colorado) Wood / Kot	0	0	1	0	0	2	0	X	3
(Minnesota) Farrell / Thurston	1	2	0	2	1	0	3	X	9

Sheet E	1	2	3	4	5	6	7	8	Final
(Wisconsin) K. Nickel / G. Nickel	0	0	1	0	0	1	1	1	4
(Minnesota) Schweitzer / Hagberg	1	2	0	1	1	0	0	0	5

=== Draw 8 ===
Thursday, February 29, 7:00 pm

Sheet B	1	2	3	4	5	6	7	8	9	Final
(Minnesota) Geving / Shuster	0	2	0	1	0	1	0	2	1	7
(Minnesota) S. Anderson / Stopera	1	0	1	0	3	0	1	0	0	6

Sheet C	1	2	3	4	5	6	7	8	Final
(Wisconsin) B. Hamilton / M. Hamilton	0	1	2	1	0	6	X	X	10
(Minnesota) Bear / Oldenburg	2	0	0	0	1	0	X	X	3

Sheet D	1	2	3	4	5	6	7	8	Final
(Colorado) Weldon / Franey	2	0	3	0	0	2	0	1	8
(Minnesota) T. Anderson / Richardson	0	2	0	1	1	0	3	0	7

Sheet E	1	2	3	4	5	6	7	8	Final
(North Dakota) Podoll / Parry	0	5	0	1	3	1	1	X	11
(Minnesota) R. Birr / T. Birr	1	0	4	0	0	0	0	X	5

=== Draw 9 ===
Friday, March 1, 9:00 am

Sheet B	1	2	3	4	5	6	7	8	Final
(Wisconsin) K. Nickel / G. Nickel	0	0	0	0	1	0	X	X	1
(Colorado) Wood / Kot	3	1	1	1	0	3	X	X	9

Sheet C	1	2	3	4	5	6	7	8	Final
(Minnesota) Farrell / Thurston	0	0	1	0	1	0	3	0	5
(Alaska) Persinger / Casper	2	1	0	2	0	1	0	1	7

Sheet D	1	2	3	4	5	6	7	8	Final
(Minnesota) Rhyme / Smith	1	0	2	4	0	5	X	X	12
(Minnesota) Schweitzer / Hagberg	0	1	0	0	2	0	X	X	3

Sheet E	1	2	3	4	5	6	7	8	Final
(Colorado) Moores / Wheeler	0	1	0	0	2	0	1	X	4
(Minnesota) Thiesse / Dropkin	1	0	1	1	0	3	0	X	6

=== Draw 10 ===
Friday, March 1, 12:30 pm

Sheet B	1	2	3	4	5	6	7	8	9	Final
(North Dakota) Podoll / Parry	0	0	4	0	1	0	1	0	1	7
(Colorado) Weldon / Franey	1	1	0	2	0	1	0	1	0	6

Sheet C	1	2	3	4	5	6	7	8	Final
(Minnesota) T. Anderson / Richardson	2	0	2	1	0	0	4	1	10
(Minnesota) Geving / Shuster	0	2	0	0	2	1	0	0	5

Sheet D	1	2	3	4	5	6	7	8	Final
(Minnesota) Bear / Oldenburg	3	3	1	1	1	2	X	X	11
(Minnesota) R. Birr / T. Birr	0	0	0	0	0	0	X	X	0

Sheet E	1	2	3	4	5	6	7	8	Final
(Wisconsin) B. Hamilton / M. Hamilton	2	0	0	1	0	2	0	3	8
(Minnesota) S. Anderson / Stopera	0	1	1	0	1	0	1	0	4

=== Draw 11 ===
Friday, March 1, 4:00 pm

Sheet B	1	2	3	4	5	6	7	8	9	Final
(Minnesota) Rhyme / Smith	1	1	0	0	1	0	1	0	1	5
(Alaska) Persinger / Casper	0	0	1	1	0	1	0	1	0	4

Sheet C	1	2	3	4	5	6	7	8	Final
(Minnesota) Thiesse / Dropkin	3	1	1	1	1	0	X	X	7
(Colorado) Wood / Kot	0	0	0	0	0	1	X	X	1

Sheet D	1	2	3	4	5	6	7	8	Final
(Wisconsin) K. Nickel / G. Nickel	0	2	0	0	1	0	1	X	4
(Colorado) Moores / Wheeler	1	0	2	1	0	2	0	X	6

Sheet E	1	2	3	4	5	6	7	8	Final
(Minnesota) Schweitzer / Hagberg	0	0	1	2	0	2	0	X	5
(Minnesota) Farrell / Thurston	1	1	0	0	5	0	2	X	9

=== Draw 12 ===
Friday, March 1, 7:30 pm

Sheet B	1	2	3	4	5	6	7	8	Final
(Minnesota) Bear / Oldenburg	1	3	0	0	1	0	2	0	7
(Minnesota) Geving / Shuster	0	0	1	1	0	1	0	2	5

Sheet C	1	2	3	4	5	6	7	8	Final
(Minnesota) S. Anderson / Stopera	3	0	4	2	0	1	2	X	12
(Colorado) Weldon / Franey	0	3	0	0	2	0	0	X	5

Sheet D	1	2	3	4	5	6	7	8	Final
(North Dakota) Podoll / Parry	1	0	0	0	2	0	1	X	4
(Wisconsin) B. Hamilton / M. Hamilton	0	4	1	1	0	1	0	X	7

Sheet E	1	2	3	4	5	6	7	8	Final
(Minnesota) R. Birr / T. Birr	1	2	0	0	0	0	X	X	3
(Minnesota) T. Anderson / Richardson	0	0	2	2	2	3	X	X	9

=== Draw 13 ===
Saturday, March 2, 9:00 am

Sheet B	1	2	3	4	5	6	7	8	Final
(Minnesota) Schweitzer / Hagberg	0	0	1	0	2	0	X	X	3
(Colorado) Moores / Wheeler	1	3	0	2	0	3	X	X	9

Sheet C	1	2	3	4	5	6	7	8	Final
(Wisconsin) K. Nickel / G. Nickel	1	0	1	0	1	2	0	X	5
(Minnesota) Farrell / Thurston	0	2	0	2	0	0	4	X	8

Sheet D	1	2	3	4	5	6	7	8	Final
(Minnesota) Thiesse / Dropkin	2	1	1	1	0	1	0	X	6
(Minnesota) Rhyme / Smith	0	0	0	0	1	0	1	X	2

Sheet E	1	2	3	4	5	6	7	8	Final
(Colorado) Wood / Kot	0	3	1	0	0	0	0	X	4
(Alaska) Persinger / Casper	2	0	0	4	2	1	1	X	10

=== Draw 14 ===
Saturday, March 2, 12:00 pm

Sheet B	1	2	3	4	5	6	7	8	Final
(Minnesota) R. Birr / T. Birr	2	0	0	0	1	0	X	X	3
(Wisconsin) B. Hamilton / M. Hamilton	0	1	2	3	0	2	X	X	8

Sheet C	1	2	3	4	5	6	7	8	Final
(North Dakota) Podoll / Parry	1	0	1	1	1	0	0	0	4
(Minnesota) T. Anderson / Richardson	0	3	0	0	0	2	2	2	9

Sheet D	1	2	3	4	5	6	7	8	Final
(Minnesota) S. Anderson / Stopera	3	0	2	1	1	0	3	X	10
(Minnesota) Bear / Oldenburg	0	3	0	0	0	2	0	X	5

Sheet E	1	2	3	4	5	6	7	8	Final
(Colorado) Weldon / Franey	0	3	2	0	0	1	0	1	7
(Minnesota) Geving / Shuster	2	0	0	1	2	0	4	0	9

== Tiebreaker ==
Saturday, March 2, 3:30 pm

Sheet C	1	2	3	4	5	6	7	8	Final
(Wisconsin) B. Hamilton / M. Hamilton	1	1	2	0	3	2	X	X	9
(Minnesota) S. Anderson / Stopera	0	0	0	1	0	0	X	X	1

== Playoffs ==
Quarterfinals
B2	(Minnesota) Geving / Shuster	10
A3	(Alaska) Persinger / Casper	5
A2	(Minnesota) Rhyme / Smith	6
B3	(Wisconsin) B. Hamilton / M. Hamilton	7

Semifinals
A1	(Minnesota) Thiesse / Dropkin	9
B2	(Minnesota) Geving / Shuster	4
B1	(Minnesota) T. Anderson / Richardson	7
B3	(Wisconsin) B. Hamilton / M. Hamilton	8

Final
A1	(Minnesota) Thiesse / Dropkin	6
B3	(Wisconsin) B. Hamilton / M. Hamilton	7
Bronze medal game
B2	(Minnesota) Geving / Shuster	7
B1	(Minnesota) T. Anderson / Richardson	4

=== Quarterfinals ===
Saturday, March 2, 7:30 pm

Sheet C	1	2	3	4	5	6	7	8	Final
(Minnesota) Geving / Shuster	2	2	0	0	3	0	1	2	10
(Alaska) Persinger / Casper	0	0	1	2	0	2	0	0	5

Sheet D	1	2	3	4	5	6	7	8	Final
(Minnesota) Rhyme / Smith	1	2	0	0	0	0	3	0	6
(Wisconsin) B. Hamilton / M. Hamilton	0	0	1	1	1	1	0	3	7

=== Semifinals ===
Sunday, March 3, 10:00 am

Sheet B	1	2	3	4	5	6	7	8	9	Final
(Minnesota) T. Anderson / Richardson	0	0	3	2	0	2	0	0	0	7
(Wisconsin) B. Hamilton / M. Hamilton	4	1	0	0	1	0	1	0	1	8

Sheet E	1	2	3	4	5	6	7	8	Final
(Minnesota) Thiesse / Dropkin	1	0	1	1	0	4	2	X	9
(Minnesota) Geving / Shuster	0	2	0	0	2	0	0	X	4

=== Bronze medal game ===
Sunday, March 3, 4:00 pm

Sheet C	1	2	3	4	5	6	7	8	Final
(Minnesota) Geving / Shuster	1	1	1	1	0	3	0	X	7
(Minnesota) T. Anderson / Richardson	0	0	0	0	2	0	2	X	4

=== Final ===
Sunday, March 3, 4:00 pm

Sheet D	1	2	3	4	5	6	7	8	Final
(Minnesota) Thiesse / Dropkin	0	2	1	0	2	0	1	0	6
(Wisconsin) B. Hamilton / M. Hamilton	1	0	0	1	0	3	0	2	7
