= Becca Hamilton =

American Olympic curler

- Curler
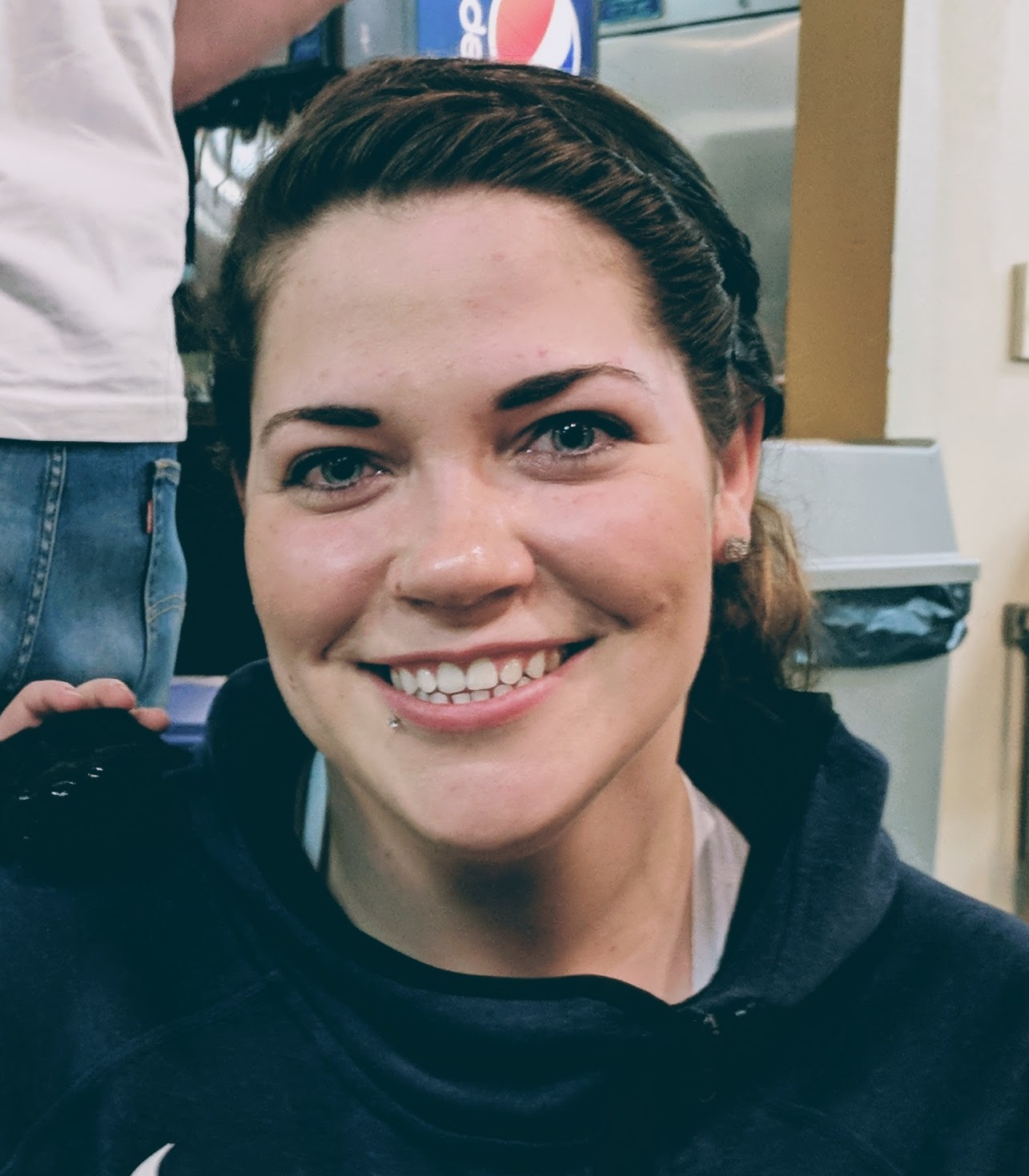
- Hamilton in 2018
- Other names: Rebecca Lynn Hamilton
- Born: July 12, 1990 (age 36); Madison, Wisconsin, U.S.
- Height: 5 ft 5 in (165 cm)

Team
- Curling club: Madison CC, Madison, Wisconsin
- Mixed doubles partner: Matt Hamilton

Curling career
- Member Association: United States
- World Championship: 5 (2015, 2017, 2021, 2023, 2024)
- World Mixed Doubles Championship: 3 (2017, 2022, 2024)
- Pan Continental Championship: 2 (2022, 2023)
- Olympic: 2 (2018, 2022)
Medal record
Representing United States
Women's curling
World Championships
Bronze medal – third place	2021 Calgary
Pan Continental Championships
Bronze medal – third place	2023 Kelowna
United States Women's Championship
Gold medal – first place	2010 Kalamazoo
Gold medal – first place	2014 Philadelphia
Gold medal – first place	2020 Cheney
Gold medal – first place	2023 Denver
Gold medal – first place	2024 East Rutherford
Silver medal – second place	2017 Everett
Silver medal – second place	2019 Kalamazoo
United States Olympic Trials
Gold medal – first place	2017 Omaha
Gold medal – first place	2021 Omaha
Mixed doubles curling
United States Mixed Doubles Olympic Trials
Gold medal – first place	2017 Blaine
United States Mixed Doubles Championship
Gold medal – first place	2017 Blaine
Gold medal – first place	2022 Middleton
Gold medal – first place	2024 Traverse City

Rebecca Lynn Hamilton (born July 12, 1990) is an American curler from McFarland, Wisconsin. She is a five-time national women's champion, three-time national mixed doubles champion, two-time national junior champion, and a two-time Olympian. At the 2018 PyeongChang Olympics, she competed in mixed doubles curling with her brother, Matt, along with playing with the women's curling team. She was again on the women's curling team during the 2022 Beijing Olympics.

== Career ==
Hamilton's junior career involved participating in five straight national junior championships from 2008 to 2012. She won the event in both 2008 and 2011. In 2008, Hamilton played third for the Nina Spatola junior team, which finished with a 1–6 (8th) record at the 2008 World Junior Curling Championships. In 2011, Hamilton skipped the team of Tara Peterson, Karlie Koenig and Sophie Brorson to a 5–5 (5th) record at the 2011 World Junior Curling Championships.

Hamilton has also played in eight national championships. At the 2010 United States Women's Curling Championship, Hamilton skipped a team of Koenig, Jenna Haag, and Grace Gabower to a 7–2 round robin finish in a four-way tie for first. However, the team would lose in their first playoff game against Patti Lank. However, Hamilton's trip to the 2012 United States Women's Curling Championship would be less successful. She skipped a team of Peterson, Koenig, and Brorson to a 4–5 record and missed the playoffs. At the 2013 United States Women's Curling Championship, Hamilton led her rink of Molly Bonner, Peterson, and Brorson to a 3–6 finish, again missing the playoffs.

In 2013, she joined up with her junior skip, Nina Spatola, throwing third stones for the team. The team won the 2014 United States Women's Curling Championship. The following season, Hamilton was moved to second on the team. The team had less success at the 2015 United States Women's Curling Championship, finishing with a 4–5 record.

In 2015, Hamilton joined the Jamie Sinclair rink as her second. At the 2016 United States Women's Curling Championship, they would finish in fourth place. She would only play with Sinclair for one season before returning to the Spatola (now Roth) rink, throwing lead rocks. The team was runners-up at the 2017 US Championships but represented the United States at the 2017 World Women's Curling Championship, finishing in sixth place.

At the 2018 Winter Olympics, Hamilton placed sixth in the mixed doubles competition and eighth in the team competition.

At the 2020 United States Women's Championship, Hamilton earned her second national title, as third for Tabitha Peterson. In the round robin, Team Peterson's only loss came against Jamie Sinclair, but they then beat Team Sinclair in the 1 vs. 2 page playoff game and again in the final. As United States Champions Team Peterson would have represented the United States at the 2020 World Women's Curling Championship, but they lost that opportunity when the Championship was cancelled due to the COVID-19 pandemic. They also earned a spot at the final Grand Slam of the season, the Champions Cup, which was also cancelled due to the pandemic. Their qualification will instead carry over to the 2021 Champions Cup.

During the 2020 off-season, the team announced that Tabitha Peterson would remain as skip when Roth returned from maternity leave. Roth re-joined the team as vice-skip at third, with Hamilton moving to second, Tara Peterson to lead, and Geving to alternate. Due to the COVID-19 pandemic, the Peterson team did not compete in events for most of the 2020–21 season until entering a bio-secure bubble held in Calgary, Alberta in the spring of 2021 for three events in a row. The first two events were the Champions Cup and Players' Championship grand slams, with the team missing the playoffs at both. The third event in the Calgary bubble for Team Peterson was the 2021 World Women's Championship, in which they earned a spot as 2020 National Champions after the 2021 National Championship was moved to later in the spring due to the pandemic. They finished the 13-game round-robin in fifth place with a 7–6 record, earning them a spot in the playoffs and securing a 2022 Olympic berth for the United States. In the playoffs, Team Peterson defeated Denmark's Madeline Dupont but lost to Switzerland's Silvana Tirinzoni to end up in the bronze medal game. There, Peterson faced off against Sweden's Anna Hasselborg and won with a score of 9–5, including scoring five points in the seventh end. Team Peterson's bronze medal finish was the first World Women's medal for the United States in 15 years, and the first-ever bronze medal.

The Peterson rink won their first two events of the 2021–22 season, the US Open of Curling and the 2021 Curlers Corner Autumn Gold Curling Classic. The following week, they played in the 2021 Masters where they made it as far as the quarterfinals. The team then played in the 2021 United States Olympic Curling Trials, where they attempted to return to the Olympics. Through the round robin, the team posted a 9–1 record, putting them into the best-of-three final against Cory Christensen. The Peterson rink beat Christensen in two-straight games, booking their tickets to the 2022 Winter Olympics. After the Trials, the team played in one event before the Olympics, the Curl Mesabi Classic, which they won, beating Christensen again in the final. At the Olympics, the team finished the round robin with a 4–5 record, missing the playoffs. The team finished off the season by playing in two Slams, the 2022 Players' Championship and the 2022 Champions Cup, missing the playoffs in both events. In mixed doubles that season, she and her brother Matt Hamilton played in the 2021 United States mixed doubles curling Olympic trials, where they posted a 5–4 round robin record. This put them in a tiebreaker, which they lost, eliminating them from contention. The pair later competed in the 2022 United States Mixed Doubles Curling Championship, where they went undefeated to secure the national title. At the 2022 World Mixed Doubles Curling Championship, they finished fourth in their pool with a 5–4 record, not enough to advance to the playoff round.

Following the 2021–22 season, Nina Roth retired from competitive curling and the team added Cory Thiesse (née Christensen) as their new third. After a semifinal finish at the US Open of Curling, the team missed the playoffs at both the 2022 National and the 2022 Tour Challenge Slam events. They represented the United States at the 2022 Pan Continental Curling Championships where they finished first in the round robin with a 7–1 record. They then lost to South Korea and Canada in the semifinal and bronze medal game respectively, finishing fourth. In their next event, Team Peterson reached the semifinals of the Red Deer Curling Classic where they lost to Rachel Homan. At the 2022 Masters, the team made it to the semifinals before losing to the Einarson rink. The following week, they won the Curl Mesabi Classic. In the new year, the team went undefeated to claim the 2023 United States Women's Curling Championship, defeating Delaney Strouse 8–5 in the final. This qualified them for the 2023 World Women's Curling Championship where they finished just outside the playoffs with a 6–6 record. The team ended their season at the 2023 Players' Championship and the 2023 Champions Cup Grand Slam events where they reached the quarterfinals and semifinals respectively. In mixed doubles play, the Hamilton siblings lost in the quarterfinals of the 2023 United States Mixed Doubles Curling Championship.

Team Peterson won their second event of the 2023–24 season, losing just one game en route to claiming the US Open of Curling. They also had a semifinal finish at the 2023 Stu Sells Oakville Tankard and a quarterfinal appearance at the 2023 Curlers Corner Autumn Gold Curling Classic. For the 2023 Pan Continental Curling Championships, the team changed their lineup with Hamilton and Tara Peterson switching positions to lead and second on the team respectively. The move worked as they finished 6–1 through the round robin. After a semifinal loss to Japan's Satsuki Fujisawa, Team Peterson bounced back to claim the bronze medal, stealing in an extra end to defeat Canada's Kerri Einarson. In Grand Slam play, they only qualified in one of the four events they played in, the 2023 Masters, losing in the quarterfinals to Silvana Tirinzoni. At the 2024 United States Women's Curling Championship, the Peterson rink lost their first game to Sarah Anderson before running the table the rest of the event. In the final, they doubled up on Team Anderson 10–5 to defend their title as national champions and qualify for the 2024 World Women's Curling Championship. At Worlds, the team struggled to find consistency, ultimately finishing 6–6 and failing to reach the playoffs for a second year in a row. In March, the Hamilton siblings won their third United States Mixed Doubles Curling Championship, defeating reigning world champions Cory Thiesse and Korey Dropkin in the final.

== Personal life ==
Her brother Matt Hamilton is also a successful curler, having played on the 2018 United States Olympic men's team. Matt and Becca also competed together in mixed doubles at the 2018 Winter Olympics. She attended Edgewood College.

== Teams ==
=== Women's ===
Season	Skip	Third	Second	Lead	Alternate	Coach	Events
2007–08	Nina Spatola	Becca Hamilton	Jenna Haag	Anna Plys	Karlie Koenig (WJCC)	Neil Doese (WJCC)	2008 USJCC (gold); 2008 WJCC (8th)
2008–09	Nina Spatola	Molly Bonner	Becca Hamilton	Anna Plys			
2009–10	Becca Hamilton	Karlie Koenig	Jenna Haag	Grace Grabower			2010 USJCC (silver); 2010 USWCC (4th)
2010–11	Becca Hamilton	Tara Peterson	Karlie Koenig	Sophie Brorson	Rebecca Funk (WJCC)	Neil Doese (WJCC)	2011 USJCC (gold); 2011 WJCC (5th)
2011–12	Becca Hamilton	Tara Peterson	Karlie Koenig	Sophie Brorson			2012 USJCC (bronze); 2012 USWCC (7th)
2012–13	Becca Hamilton	Molly Bonner	Tara Peterson	Sophie Brorson			2013 USWCC (8th)
2013–14	Nina Spatola	Becca Hamilton	Tara Peterson	Sophie Brorson			2014 USWCC (gold)
2014–15	Nina Roth	Jamie Sinclair	Becca Hamilton	Tabitha Peterson			2015 USWCC (5th)
2014–15	Aileen Sormunen	Monica Walker	Tara Peterson	Vicky Persinger	Becca Hamilton	Scott Baird	2015 WWCC (10th)
2015–16	Jamie Sinclair	Tabitha Peterson	Becca Hamilton	Jenna Haag	Tara Peterson		2016 USWCC (4th)
2016–17	Nina Roth	Tabitha Peterson	Aileen Geving	Becca Hamilton	Cory Christensen(WWCC)	Ann Swisshelm	2017 USWCC (silver); 2017 WWCC (5th)
2017–18	Nina Roth	Tabitha Peterson	Aileen Geving	Becca Hamilton	Cory Christensen(OG)	Al Hackner	2017 USOCT (gold); 2018 WOG (8th); 2018 Cont. Cup
2018–19	Nina Roth	Tabitha Peterson	Becca Hamilton	Tara Peterson			2019 USWCC (silver)
2019–20	Tabitha Peterson	Becca Hamilton	Tara Peterson	Aileen Geving		Natalie Nicholson	2020 USWCC (gold)
2020–21	Tabitha Peterson	Nina Roth	Becca Hamilton	Tara Peterson	Aileen Geving	Laine Peters	2021 WWCC (bronze)
2021–22	Tabitha Peterson	Nina Roth	Becca Hamilton	Tara Peterson	Aileen Geving	Laine Peters, Phill Drobnick	2021 USOCT (gold); 2022 WOG (6th)
2022–23	Tabitha Peterson	Cory Thiesse	Becca Hamilton	Tara Peterson	Vicky Persinger (PCCC/WWCC)	Laine Peters	2022 PCCC (4th); 2023 USWCC (gold); 2023 WWCC (7th)
2023–24	Tabitha Peterson	Cory Thiesse	Tara Peterson	Becca Hamilton	Vicky Persinger (PCCC/WWCC)	Cathy Overton-Clapham	2023 PCCC (bronze); 2024 USWCC (gold); 2024 WWCC (7th)

=== Mixed doubles ===
Season	Female	Male	Events
2015–16	Becca Hamilton	Matt Hamilton	2016 US World Trials (4th)
2016–17	Becca Hamilton	Matt Hamilton	2017 USMDCC (gold); 2017 WMDCC (10th)
2017–18	Becca Hamilton	Matt Hamilton	2017 USMDOT (gold); 2018 OG (6th)
2018–19	Becca Hamilton	Matt Hamilton	2019 USMDCC (QF)
2019–20	Becca Hamilton	Matt Hamilton	2020 USMDCC (QF)
2020–21	Becca Hamilton	Matt Hamilton	
2021–22	Becca Hamilton	Matt Hamilton	2021 USMDOT (5th); 2022 USMDCC (gold); 2022 WMDCC (8th)
2022–23	Becca Hamilton	Matt Hamilton	2023 USMDCC (QF)
2023–24	Becca Hamilton	Matt Hamilton	2024 USMDCC (gold); 2024 WMDCC (10th)
2024–25	Becca Hamilton	Matt Hamilton	2025 USMDOT (7th)
2026–27	Becca Hamilton	Matt Hamilton	
