= Jason Smith (curler) =

American curler (born 1983)

- Curler
- Born: September 18, 1983 (age 43); Robbinsdale, Minnesota, U.S.

Team
- Curling club: Four Seasons CC, Blaine, MN
- Skip: Jason Smith
- Third: Dominik Märki
- Second: Jared Allen
- Lead: Hunter Clawson
- Mixed doubles partner: Kim Rhyme

Curling career
- Member Association: United States
- World Championship: 1 (2009)
- Olympic: 1 (2010)
Medal record
Curling
Representing United States
US Men's Championship
| Gold medal – first place | 2009 Broomfield |
US Olympic Trials
| Gold medal – first place | 2009 Duluth |
US Mixed Doubles Championship
| Gold medal – first place | 2016 Denver |

Jason Smith (born September 18, 1983) is an American curler from St. Paul, Minnesota.

== Career ==
Smith was formerly the vice-skip of John Shuster's team. His other teammates were Jeff Isaacson and John Benton, with Chris Plys as the alternate. As a member of this team he won the 2009 United States Olympic Curling Trials, which doubled as the National Championship, earning the team the privilege to represent the United States at the 2009 World Championships in Moncton, New Brunswick, Canada and the 2010 Winter Olympics in Vancouver, British Columbia, Canada.

At the World Championships, Jason Smith and his team placed fifth. They ended round robin play in a tie for a playoff position and they lost that tiebreaker to Team Norway.

At the Olympic Games, the United States men's curling team performed badly, finishing the round robin with a 2-7 record. During the games, Smith and Shuster switched spots in the throwing order due to Shuster's poor performance. Shuster remained skip but threw third while Smith moved to throwing fourth.

The team broke up soon after placing 8th in Vancouver. Shuster joined the Craig Brown rink, John Benton formed his own team, and Smith joined Joey Bonfoey's team for the 2010-11 World Curling Tour.

In the 2011–12 curling season, Smith rejoined with Jeff Isaacson and teamed up with American junior champion Aaron Wald and former junior teammate Kris Perkovich.

Since 2016 Smith has played with Craig Brown, Kroy Nernberger, and Sean Beighton. With that team Smith attempted to become a two-time Olympian at the 2017 United States Olympic Curling Trials. The team finished the Trials in fourth, with a record of 3-5.

=== Mixed doubles ===
Smith teamed up with Jessica Schultz and won the 2016 United States Mixed Doubles Curling Championship. At that time the US champion did not automatically represent the US at the World Mixed Doubles Championship. Instead, Smith and Schultz qualified to play in the World Mixed Doubles Trials, where Joe Polo and Tabitha Peterson won and went on to play at the World Championship.

Shortly after the 2017 team Olympic Trials, Smith also competed in the 2017 Mixed Doubles Olympic Trials. Smith and teammate Monica Walker finished fifth with a 3-4 record.

== Teammates ==
2009 Moncton World Championships

2010 Vancouver Winter Olympics

- John Shuster, Skip
- Jason Smith, Vice-skip
- Jeff Isaacson, Second
- John Benton, Lead
- Chris Plys, Alternate
