= 2024 United States Women's Curling Championship =

- Host city: East Rutherford, New Jersey
- Arena: The Rink at American Dream
- Dates: January 29 – February 4
- Winner: (Minnesota) Team Peterson
- Curling club: St. Paul CC, St. Paul
- Skip: Tabitha Peterson
- Third: Cory Thiesse
- Second: Tara Peterson
- Lead: Becca Hamilton
- Coach: Cathy Overton-Clapham
- Finalist: (Minnesota) Sarah Anderson

The 2024 United States Women's Curling Championship was held from January 29 to February 4 at The Rink at American Dream in East Rutherford, New Jersey. The event was held in conjunction with the 2024 United States Men's Curling Championship. The winning Tabitha Peterson rink represented the United States at the 2024 World Women's Curling Championship at Centre 200 in Sydney, Nova Scotia, Canada. Team Peterson also earned the first berth into the 2025 United States Olympic Curling Trials.

== Qualification process ==
The following teams qualified to participate in the 2024 national championship:

Qualification	Berths	Qualifying Team(s)
2023 World Women's Curling Championship representative	1	(Minnesota) Tabitha Peterson
2023 United States Women's Curling Championship runner-up (Note: Because Team Peterson were the representatives at both the 2023 World Women's Curling Championship and the 2023 Pan Continental Curling Championships, their second spot was awarded to the 2023 United States Women's Curling Championship runner-up, Team Strouse.)	1	(Michigan) Delaney Strouse
2023 World Junior-B Curling Championships representative	1	(North Dakota) Miranda Scheel
Qualifying Event #1 (US Open of Curling)	1	(Minnesota) Sarah Anderson
Qualifying Event #2 (Curl Mesabi Classic)	1	(North Dakota) Rachel Workin
WCF Year-to-date points leaders (December 23, 2023)	3	(Massachusetts) Elizabeth Cousins (Minnesota) Christine McMakin (Minnesota) Kim Rhyme
TOTAL	8	

== Teams ==
The teams are listed as follows:

Skip	Third	Second	Lead	Alternate	Locale
Sarah Anderson	Taylor Anderson	Lexi Lanigan	Leah Yavarow		Minneapolis, Minnesota
Elizabeth Cousins	Annmarie Dubberstein	Allison Howell	Elizabeth Janiak		Boston, Massachusetts
Christine McMakin	Cora Farrell	Jenna Burchesky	Clare Moores		Minneapolis, Minnesota
Tabitha Peterson	Cory Thiesse	Tara Peterson	Becca Hamilton		St. Paul, Minnesota
Kim Rhyme	Libby Brundage	Cait Flannery	Katie Rhyme		Minneapolis, Minnesota
Miranda Scheel	Sara Olson	Jordan Hein	Tessa Thurlow		Fargo, North Dakota
Delaney Strouse	Anne O'Hara	Sydney Mullaney	Rebecca Rodgers	Susan Dudt	Traverse City, Michigan
Rachel Workin	Ann Podoll	Anya Normandeau	Christina Lammers		Fargo, North Dakota

== Map of teams ==
2024 Women's Teams

== Round robin standings ==
Final Round Robin Standings

Key
Teams to Playoffs
Teams to Tiebreaker

Team	W	L	W–L	PF	PA	EW	EL	BE	SE
(Minnesota) Sarah Anderson	6	1	1–0	62	43	34	26	3	8
(Minnesota) Tabitha Peterson	6	1	0–1	65	42	34	25	4	12
(Michigan) Delaney Strouse	5	2	–	61	43	33	28	2	12
(North Dakota) Miranda Scheel	3	4	1–0	54	57	30	31	3	7
(Minnesota) Christine McMakin	3	4	0–1	58	68	34	31	1	10
(Minnesota) Kim Rhyme	2	5	1–0	40	57	24	32	3	3
(Massachusetts) Elizabeth Cousins	2	5	0–1	54	51	28	35	3	7
(North Dakota) Rachel Workin	1	6	–	35	68	24	33	4	3

== Round robin results ==
All draw times are listed in Eastern Time (UTC−05:00).

=== Draw 1 ===
Monday, January 29, 7:00 pm

Sheet A	1	2	3	4	5	6	7	8	9	10	Final
(Minnesota) Christine McMakin	0	0	2	0	3	0	4	0	1	X	10
(North Dakota) Miranda Scheel 🔨	1	2	0	4	0	3	0	2	0	X	12

Sheet B	1	2	3	4	5	6	7	8	9	10	Final
(Massachusetts) Elizabeth Cousins	0	0	4	2	5	0	0	1	X	X	12
(North Dakota) Rachel Workin 🔨	0	1	0	0	0	1	1	0	X	X	3

Sheet C	1	2	3	4	5	6	7	8	9	10	Final
(Minnesota) Sarah Anderson 🔨	3	2	0	1	0	0	1	0	3	X	10
(Minnesota) Tabitha Peterson	0	0	2	0	1	1	0	1	0	X	5

Sheet D	1	2	3	4	5	6	7	8	9	10	Final
(Minnesota) Kim Rhyme	0	0	0	0	0	2	X	X	X	X	2
(Michigan) Delaney Strouse 🔨	1	3	2	2	1	0	X	X	X	X	9

=== Draw 2 ===
Tuesday, January 30, 2:00 pm

Sheet A	1	2	3	4	5	6	7	8	9	10	Final
(Minnesota) Tabitha Peterson	0	2	0	2	2	0	3	0	2	X	11
(North Dakota) Rachel Workin 🔨	1	0	1	0	0	2	0	1	0	X	5

Sheet B	1	2	3	4	5	6	7	8	9	10	Final
(North Dakota) Miranda Scheel 🔨	0	0	1	0	2	1	0	0	0	X	4
(Michigan) Delaney Strouse	1	1	0	2	0	0	2	2	4	X	12

Sheet C	1	2	3	4	5	6	7	8	9	10	Final
(Minnesota) Christine McMakin	0	1	0	2	2	0	1	0	1	2	9
(Minnesota) Kim Rhyme 🔨	1	0	2	0	0	2	0	2	0	0	7

Sheet D	1	2	3	4	5	6	7	8	9	10	Final
(Massachusetts) Elizabeth Cousins	0	3	0	2	0	1	0	2	3	X	11
(Minnesota) Sarah Anderson 🔨	1	0	1	0	2	0	1	0	0	X	5

=== Draw 3 ===
Wednesday, January 31, 8:00 am

Sheet A	1	2	3	4	5	6	7	8	9	10	Final
(Minnesota) Sarah Anderson 🔨	1	0	3	0	0	2	0	1	3	X	10
(Minnesota) Christine McMakin	0	1	0	1	1	0	3	0	0	X	6

Sheet B	1	2	3	4	5	6	7	8	9	10	Final
(North Dakota) Rachel Workin	0	1	0	2	0	0	1	0	X	X	4
(Minnesota) Kim Rhyme 🔨	3	0	3	0	2	1	0	1	X	X	10

Sheet C	1	2	3	4	5	6	7	8	9	10	11	Final
(Massachusetts) Elizabeth Cousins	0	0	0	1	1	0	1	0	1	2	0	6
(Michigan) Delaney Strouse 🔨	0	3	1	0	0	1	0	1	0	0	2	8

Sheet D	1	2	3	4	5	6	7	8	9	10	Final
(North Dakota) Miranda Scheel	0	0	1	0	2	0	2	0	0	X	5
(Minnesota) Tabitha Peterson 🔨	0	2	0	3	0	1	0	1	1	X	8

=== Draw 4 ===
Wednesday, January 31, 4:00 pm

Sheet A	1	2	3	4	5	6	7	8	9	10	Final
(Michigan) Delaney Strouse	0	3	0	1	0	0	1	1	0	0	6
(Minnesota) Tabitha Peterson 🔨	1	0	3	0	0	1	0	0	2	2	9

Sheet B	1	2	3	4	5	6	7	8	9	10	11	Final
(Minnesota) Christine McMakin	0	1	0	3	1	0	1	2	2	0	1	11
(Massachusetts) Elizabeth Cousins 🔨	2	0	1	0	0	4	0	0	0	3	0	10

Sheet C	1	2	3	4	5	6	7	8	9	10	Final
(North Dakota) Miranda Scheel 🔨	5	1	0	1	0	1	0	1	0	0	9
(North Dakota) Rachel Workin	0	0	3	0	2	0	1	0	3	1	10

Sheet D	1	2	3	4	5	6	7	8	9	10	Final
(Minnesota) Sarah Anderson	0	1	0	3	1	0	3	0	2	X	10
(Minnesota) Kim Rhyme 🔨	2	0	1	0	0	1	0	2	0	X	6

=== Draw 5 ===
Thursday, February 1, 10:00 am

Sheet A	1	2	3	4	5	6	7	8	9	10	Final
(Massachusetts) Elizabeth Cousins 🔨	0	2	0	0	1	1	0	2	0	0	6
(Minnesota) Kim Rhyme	0	0	1	1	0	0	2	0	2	1	7

Sheet B	1	2	3	4	5	6	7	8	9	10	Final
(Minnesota) Sarah Anderson 🔨	2	1	0	2	0	0	0	2	0	2	9
(North Dakota) Miranda Scheel	0	0	2	0	2	2	0	0	2	0	8

Sheet C	1	2	3	4	5	6	7	8	9	10	Final
(Minnesota) Tabitha Peterson	1	0	0	0	2	0	3	3	3	X	12
(Minnesota) Christine McMakin 🔨	0	3	1	1	0	2	0	0	0	X	7

Sheet D	1	2	3	4	5	6	7	8	9	10	Final
(Michigan) Delaney Strouse 🔨	3	0	0	2	0	2	0	0	1	0	8
(North Dakota) Rachel Workin	0	0	2	0	1	0	1	1	0	2	7

=== Draw 6 ===
Thursday, February 1, 7:00 pm

Sheet A	1	2	3	4	5	6	7	8	9	10	Final
(North Dakota) Miranda Scheel 🔨	1	0	1	1	0	1	1	0	2	X	7
(Massachusetts) Elizabeth Cousins	0	1	0	0	1	0	0	1	0	X	3

Sheet B	1	2	3	4	5	6	7	8	9	10	Final
(Minnesota) Kim Rhyme 🔨	2	0	0	1	0	0	0	0	X	X	3
(Minnesota) Tabitha Peterson	0	2	0	0	2	1	1	4	X	X	10

Sheet C	1	2	3	4	5	6	7	8	9	10	Final
(Michigan) Delaney Strouse	0	0	0	1	1	0	2	0	2	0	6
(Minnesota) Sarah Anderson 🔨	0	1	1	0	0	2	0	1	0	2	7

Sheet D	1	2	3	4	5	6	7	8	9	10	Final
(North Dakota) Rachel Workin	0	0	0	0	2	0	2	0	1	X	5
(Minnesota) Christine McMakin 🔨	0	1	2	1	0	2	0	1	0	X	7

=== Draw 7 ===
Friday, February 2, 2:00 pm

Sheet A	1	2	3	4	5	6	7	8	9	10	Final
(North Dakota) Rachel Workin	0	0	0	0	0	1	0	X	X	X	1
(Minnesota) Sarah Anderson 🔨	0	2	3	2	2	0	2	X	X	X	11

Sheet B	1	2	3	4	5	6	7	8	9	10	Final
(Michigan) Delaney Strouse	0	4	0	2	0	2	1	0	3	X	12
(Minnesota) Christine McMakin 🔨	1	0	1	0	3	0	0	3	0	X	8

Sheet C	1	2	3	4	5	6	7	8	9	10	Final
(Minnesota) Kim Rhyme 🔨	0	0	3	0	1	0	1	0	0	X	5
(North Dakota) Miranda Scheel	0	0	0	2	0	2	0	2	3	X	9

Sheet D	1	2	3	4	5	6	7	8	9	10	Final
(Minnesota) Tabitha Peterson 🔨	0	2	1	0	0	3	2	0	2	X	10
(Massachusetts) Elizabeth Cousins	4	0	0	1	0	0	0	1	0	X	6

== Tiebreaker ==
Saturday, February 3, 7:30 am

Sheet A	1	2	3	4	5	6	7	8	9	10	Final
(North Dakota) Miranda Scheel 🔨	1	1	1	0	0	2	0	0	1	0	6
(Minnesota) Christine McMakin	0	0	0	1	0	0	2	1	0	1	5

== Playoffs ==
Page playoff system
1	(Minnesota) Sarah Anderson	4
2	(Minnesota) Tabitha Peterson	7
3	(Michigan) Delaney Strouse	10
4	(North Dakota) Miranda Scheel	9

Semifinal
1	(Minnesota) Sarah Anderson	11
3	(Michigan) Delaney Strouse	7

Final
2	(Minnesota) Tabitha Peterson	10
1	(Minnesota) Sarah Anderson	5

=== 1 vs. 2 ===
Saturday, February 3, 12:00 pm

Sheet D	1	2	3	4	5	6	7	8	9	10	Final
(Minnesota) Sarah Anderson 🔨	0	0	0	0	1	0	1	0	2	0	4
(Minnesota) Tabitha Peterson	0	1	1	1	0	1	0	1	0	2	7

=== 3 vs. 4 ===
Saturday, February 3, 12:00 pm

Sheet B	1	2	3	4	5	6	7	8	9	10	Final
(Michigan) Delaney Strouse 🔨	1	0	0	3	3	0	1	2	0	0	10
(North Dakota) Miranda Scheel	0	2	1	0	0	3	0	0	2	1	9

=== Semifinal ===
Saturday, February 3, 7:00 pm

Sheet D	1	2	3	4	5	6	7	8	9	10	Final
(Minnesota) Sarah Anderson 🔨	2	0	1	0	0	2	0	3	2	1	11
(Michigan) Delaney Strouse	0	2	0	3	1	0	1	0	0	0	7

=== Final ===
Sunday, February 4, 12:00 pm

Sheet C	1	2	3	4	5	6	7	8	9	10	Final
(Minnesota) Tabitha Peterson	0	1	0	2	4	0	2	0	1	X	10
(Minnesota) Sarah Anderson 🔨	1	0	1	0	0	1	0	2	0	X	5

2024 United States Women's Curling Championship

Tabitha Peterson
4th United States Championship title
