= Susan Dudt =

American curler (born 2001)

- Curler
- Born: November 8, 2001 (age 25); Malvern, Pennsylvania, U.S.

Team
- Curling club: Philadelphia CC, Philadelphia, PA
- Mixed doubles partner: Daniel Dudt

Curling career
- Member Association: United States
Medal record
Women's curling
Representing United States
World Junior Championships
Bronze medal – third place	2022 Jönköping
Winter Universiade
Bronze medal – third place	2023 Saranac Lake
United States Women's Championship
Silver medal – second place	2023 Denver
Bronze medal – third place	2024 East Rutherford

Susan Dudt (born November 8, 2001) is an American curler from Malvern, Pennsylvania. She is a two-time champion of the United States Junior Curling Championships, going on to win the bronze medal at the 2022 World Junior Curling Championships and the 2023 Winter World University Games.

== Career ==
In 2015, Dudt competed in the playdowns for the 2016 Winter Youth Olympics with teammates Eli Clawson, Rane Anderson and Andrew Gittis. The team finished 1–4 through the round robin, not advancing to the playoffs. Also during the 2015–16 season, at just 13 years old, Dudt and her junior team of Annmarie Dubberstein, Jenna Burchesky and Allison Howell made it all the way to the semi-finals of the national junior championships before losing to Melissa Runing. The following season, Dudt began skipping her own team of Sarah Ogawa, Katherine Gourianova and Nadezhda Tschumakow after previously playing lead. The team did not qualify for the playoffs at the junior championship, finishing with a 3–4 record.

After just one season at skip, Dudt returned to playing front end for the 2017–18 season, playing second on a team skipped by Beth Podoll. The team, with third Emily Quello and lead Rebecca Rodgers finished 7–2 through the round robin at the junior championship, enough to earn them a spot in the 1 vs. 2 game. They then lost 7–5 to Madison Bear before dropping the semi-final 6–5 to Abbey Kitchens, eliminating them from contention. Later that season, the team had enough points to qualify for the 2018 United States Women's Curling Championship, Dudt's first national women's championship. They finished in fifth place out of the eight competing teams with a 3–4 record. Still of U18 age, Dudt formed a team with teammate Rebecca Rodgers, Anna Cenzalli and Sydney Mullaney for the 2018 United States U18 Curling Championships. After an undefeated round robin record and semi-final victory, they lost to Leah Yavarow 8–4 in the final.

The next season, Dudt, Quello and Rodgers joined forces with a new skip Ariel Traxler. At juniors, the team again finished third after a semi-final loss to Cait Flannery. They also qualified again for the 2019 United States Women's Curling Championship where they finished in sixth place with a 2–5 record. In her last year of eligibility for U18's, she skipped her team of Sydney Mullaney, Nadezhda Tschumakow and Alina Tschumakow to the gold medal after a 9–3 win over Samantha Jones in the championship game.

For the 2019–20 season, Dudt combined her U18 and junior teams, forming a new team with third Sydney Mullaney, second Delaney Strouse and lead Rebecca Rodgers. They reached the semi-finals of the St. Paul Cash Spiel and represented the U.S. at the 2019 Changan Ford International Curling Elite where they finished 0–7. In the new year, Strouse took over skipping duties on the team with Dudt moving down to second. The change paid off as the team won the 2020 United States Junior Curling Championships, winning 9–8 in the final against Alaska's Cora Farrell. This qualified them to represent the States at the 2021 World Junior Curling Championships, however, the event was cancelled due to the COVID-19 pandemic. They ended their season by playing in the 2020 United States Women's Curling Championship where they finished 2–5 through the round robin.

The following season, Leah Yavarow joined the team at third, shifting Mullaney down to second and Dudt to alternate. Despite the limited number of events due to the pandemic, Team Strouse won the lone tour event they played in, the contender round of the US Open of Curling. They also played in the 2021 United States Women's Curling Championship which was held in a bio-secure bubble at the Wausau Curling Club in Wausau, Wisconsin in May 2021. They finished with a 2–4 record, not advancing to the playoffs. Dudt also played in the bubble for the 2021 United States Mixed Doubles Curling Championship with her brother Daniel Dudt. The siblings qualified for the playoffs with a 4–1 record before losing in the qualification game to Jenna Burchesky and Ben Richardson.

Team Strouse began the 2021–22 season by capturing a second U.S. junior title, going undefeated to win the event. After going 5–0 in the round robin, they beat Samantha Jones in the semi-final before defeating Katherine Gourianova in the gold medal game. They also earned qualification into the 2021 United States Olympic Curling Trials by winning the Mayfield qualifying event, beating Christine McMakin in the final qualifier. Before the Trials, Leah Yavarow was replaced on the team by Anne O'Hara who became the team's new third. At the Trials, they finished tied for fifth with a 3–7 record. In January, the team was set to compete in the 2022 World Junior-B Curling Championships, however, an outbreak of COVID cases in the men's event forced the women's event to be cancelled. Because of this, the World Curling Federation named the top three ranked nations who had not already qualified for the world championship as the qualifiers, with the United States being one of them. In May 2022, they represented the U.S. at the 2022 World Junior Curling Championships. Through the round robin, the team finished in second place with a 7–2 record, suffering losses to Latvia's Evelīna Barone and the top ranked Norway's Eirin Mesloe. In the semi-finals, they met the eventual champions Japan's Sae Yamamoto where they fell 7–3. They bounced back in the bronze medal game, however, beating Norway in a 10–6 game.

The Strouse rink found major success during the 2022–23 season, beginning at the US Open of Curling where they had an undefeated run until the final where they were defeated by Ha Seung-youn. They also qualified for the playoffs in their next event, the 2022 Stu Sells Toronto Tankard, before falling in the quarterfinals to Lauren Mann. The team next played in the playdowns for the 2023 Winter World University Games where they won all four of their games to win the event. Back on tour, they had four more playoff appearances, reaching three quarterfinals and one semi-final at the Curling Stadium Contender Series. In the new year, the team represented the U.S. on home soil at the 2023 Winter World University Games in Saranac Lake, New York. The team was dominant through the round robin, with Strouse, O'Hara, Mullaney, Rodgers and Dudt securing an 8–1 record, finishing just behind Korea's Ha Seung-youn who was their sole loss. In the semi-finals, they met China's Han Yu where they suffered a narrow 6–5 loss. They would claim the bronze medal after a 7–3 win against Great Britain's Fay Henderson. Continuing their momentum from the season, Team Strouse finished 6–1 through the round robin at the 2023 United States Women's Curling Championship. In the 1 vs. 2 game, they faced the top ranked Tabitha Peterson rink where they gave up four in the tenth end to lose 11–10. They rebounded by beating Sarah Anderson 9–4 in the semi-final. They could not take revenge on Peterson in the final, however, dropping the game 8–5 and settling for the silver medal.

Beginning their season overseas, Team Strouse won the 2023 Euro Super Series to begin the 2023–24 season. Facing Italy's Stefania Constantini in the final, they scored three in the seventh end before stealing a single in the eighth to complete a 6–5 comeback. They also reached the final of their next event, the 2023 Icebreaker Challenge where they lost to Kate Cameron. After a semifinal finish at the 2023 Stu Sells Oakville Tankard, Team Strouse won the Mother Club Fall Curling Classic by winning seven straight games. In the championship game, they won 6–1 against Jolene Campbell. With all the points they accumulated in the first part of the season, the team qualified for the 2023 Tour Challenge Tier 2 Grand Slam of Curling event. There, they finished with a 2–2 record which was not enough to make the playoffs. They bounced back the following week, however, making it to the final of the Saville Grand Prix where they came up short against Selena Sturmay. They also made it to the semifinals of the Curl Mesabi Classic and the DeKalb Superspiel. Now ranked inside the top sixteen teams in the world, Team Strouse qualified for three Tier 1 Slam events. Despite winless records at the 2023 National and the 2024 Canadian Open, they finished 2–2 at the 2023 Masters. This qualified them for a tiebreaker which they lost to Sweden's Anna Hasselborg. The team ended the season at the 2024 United States Women's Curling Championship where they qualified for the playoffs with a 5–2 record. After defeating Miranda Scheel in the 3 vs. 4 game, they lost to the Sarah Anderson rink 11–7 in the semifinal.

== Personal life ==
Dudt graduated from Bucknell University in 2024 with a degree in mechanical engineering. She previously attended Great Valley High School. Her older brothers Andrew and Daniel are also curlers.

== Teams ==
Season	Skip	Third	Second	Lead	Alternate
2012–13	Annmarie Dubberstein	Jenna Burchesky	Allison Howell	Susan Dudt	
2013–14	Annmarie Dubberstein	Jenna Burchesky	Allison Howell	Susan Dudt	
2014–15	Annmarie Dubberstein	Jenna Burchesky	Allison Howell	Susan Dudt	
2015–16	Annmarie Dubberstein	Jenna Burchesky	Allison Howell	Susan Dudt	
2016–17	Susan Dudt	Sarah Ogawa	Katherine Gourianova	Nadezhda Tschumakow	Rebecca Rodgers
2017–18	Beth Podoll	Emily Quello	Susan Dudt	Rebecca Rodgers	
2017–18	Susan Dudt	Rebecca Rodgers	Anna Cenzalli	Sydney Mullaney	
2018–19	Emily Quello (Fourth)	Susan Dudt	Rebecca Rodgers	Ariel Traxler (Skip)	
2018–19	Susan Dudt	Sydney Mullaney	Nadezhda Tschumakow	Alina Tschumakow	
2019–20	Delaney Strouse	Sydney Mullaney	Susan Dudt	Rebecca Rodgers	
2020–21	Delaney Strouse	Leah Yavarow	Sydney Mullaney	Rebecca Rodgers	Susan Dudt
2021–22	Delaney Strouse	Leah Yavarow	Sydney Mullaney	Rebecca Rodgers	Susan Dudt
2021–22	Delaney Strouse	Anne O'Hara	Sydney Mullaney	Rebecca Rodgers	Susan Dudt
2022–23	Delaney Strouse	Anne O'Hara	Sydney Mullaney	Rebecca Rodgers	Susan Dudt
2023–24	Delaney Strouse	Anne O'Hara	Sydney Mullaney	Rebecca Rodgers	Susan Dudt
