= Sydney Mullaney =

American curler (born 2001)

- Curler
- Born: May 7, 2001 (age 25); Concord, Massachusetts, U.S.

Team
- Curling club: Broomstones CC, Wayland, MA
- Skip: Anne O'Hara
- Third: Anya Normandeau
- Second: Sydney Mullaney
- Lead: Ella Fleming

Curling career
- Member Association: United States
- World Championship: 2 (2022, 2026)
- World Mixed Championship: 1 (2019)
Medal record
Women's curling
Representing United States
World Junior Championships
Bronze medal – third place	2022 Jönköping
Winter Universiade
Bronze medal – third place	2023 Saranac Lake
United States Women's Championship
Gold medal – first place	2026 Charlotte
Silver medal – second place	2023 Denver
Bronze medal – third place	2024 East Rutherford

Sydney Mullaney (born May 7, 2001) is an American curler, originally from Concord, Massachusetts. She currently plays second on Team Anne O'Hara. Sydney is the 2026 United States Women’s National Champion and represented the USA at the 2026 Women’s World Championship. She is a two-time champion of the United States Junior Curling Championships, going on to win the bronze medal at the 2022 World Junior Curling Championships and the 2023 Winter World University Games. She also won the 2019 United States Mixed Curling Championship.

== Career ==
At the U18 level, Mullaney competed as lead for the Elizabeth Cousins rink. In 2017, the team went undefeated at the national championship until the final where they lost 6–4 to Cait Flannery, settling for silver. The following year, she joined the Susan Dudt rink where the team again went undefeated until the final before an 8–4 loss to Leah Yavarow. In 2019, her last year of eligibility, her team won the gold medal after a 9–3 win over Samantha Jones in the championship game.

At the end of the 2018–19 season, Mullaney teamed up with Hunter Clawson, Katherine Gourianova and Eli Clawson to compete in the 2019 United States Mixed Curling Championship. At the championship, the team finished tied for fourth through the round robin with a 6–3 record. They then won a tiebreaker against Ben Richardson before going on to beat the number one ranked Evan Workin rink in the semi-finals. In the final, they came from behind to defeat Caitlin Pulli 9–5 to win the national title. This earned them the right to represent the U.S. at the 2019 World Mixed Curling Championship in Aberdeen, Scotland. There, the team qualified for the playoffs with a 5–2 record. In the round of 16, they lost to Switzerland's Manuela Siegrist 7–2, eliminating them from contention.

For the 2019–20 season, Mullaney and Dudt added Delaney Strouse and Rebecca Rodgers as their new front end. Playing third on the team skipped by Dudt, they reached the semi-finals of the St. Paul Cash Spiel and represented the U.S. at the 2019 Changan Ford International Curling Elite where they finished 0–7. In the new year, Strouse took over skipping duties on the team with Dudt moving down to second. The change paid off as the team won the 2020 United States Junior Curling Championships, winning 9–8 in the final against Alaska's Cora Farrell. This qualified them to represent the States at the 2021 World Junior Curling Championships, however, the event was cancelled due to the COVID-19 pandemic. They ended their season by playing in the 2020 United States Women's Curling Championship where they finished 2–5 through the round robin.

The following season, Leah Yavarow joined the team at third, shifting Mullaney down to second and Dudt to alternate. Despite the limited number of events due to the pandemic, Team Strouse won the lone tour event they played in, the contender round of the US Open of Curling. They also played in the 2021 United States Women's Curling Championship which was held in a bio-secure bubble at the Wausau Curling Club in Wausau, Wisconsin in May 2021. They finished with a 2–4 record, not advancing to the playoffs. Mullaney also played in the bubble for the 2021 United States Mixed Doubles Curling Championship with partner Chase Sinnett. After a 3–2 round robin record, the pair lost a tiebreaker to Monica Walker and Alex Leichter.

Team Strouse began the 2021–22 season by capturing a second U.S. junior title, going undefeated to win the event. After going 5–0 in the round robin, they beat Samantha Jones in the semi-final before defeating Katherine Gourianova in the gold medal game. They also earned qualification into the 2021 United States Olympic Curling Trials by winning the Mayfield qualifying event, beating Christine McMakin in the final qualifier. Before the Trials, Leah Yavarow was replaced on the team by Anne O'Hara who became the team's new third. At the Trials, they finished tied for fifth with a 3–7 record. In January, the team was set to compete in the 2022 World Junior-B Curling Championships, however, an outbreak of COVID cases in the men's event forced the women's event to be cancelled. Because of this, the World Curling Federation named the top three ranked nations who had not already qualified for the world championship as the qualifiers, with the United States being one of them. In May 2022, they represented the U.S. at the 2022 World Junior Curling Championships. Through the round robin, the team finished in second place with a 7–2 record, suffering losses to Latvia's Evelīna Barone and the top ranked Norway's Eirin Mesloe. In the semi-finals, they met the eventual champions Japan's Sae Yamamoto where they fell 7–3. They bounced back in the bronze medal game, however, beating Norway in a 10–6 game. Also during the season, Mullaney was selected to be the alternate for the Cory Christensen rink for the 2022 World Women's Curling Championship. There, the team finished the round robin in fifth place with an 8–4 record. This qualified them for the playoffs where they lost in the qualification round 8–6 to Sweden's Anna Hasselborg. Mullaney played in three ends of the championship in the team's game against Canada's Kerri Einarson. Mullaney and Sinnett teamed up again for the 2022 United States Mixed Doubles Curling Championship where they lost in the final qualifying event.

The Strouse rink found major success during the 2022–23 season, beginning at the US Open of Curling where they had an undefeated run until the final where they were defeated by Ha Seung-youn. They also qualified for the playoffs in their next event, the 2022 Stu Sells Toronto Tankard, before falling in the quarterfinals to Lauren Mann. The team next played in the playdowns for the 2023 Winter World University Games where they won all four of their games to win the event. Back on tour, they had four more playoff appearances, reaching three quarterfinals and one semi-final at the Curling Stadium Contender Series. In the new year, the team represented the U.S. on home soil at the 2023 Winter World University Games in Saranac Lake, New York. The team was dominant through the round robin, with Strouse, O'Hara, Mullaney, Rodgers and Dudt securing an 8–1 record, finishing just behind Korea's Ha Seung-youn who was their sole loss. In the semi-finals, they met China's Han Yu where they suffered a narrow 6–5 loss. They would claim the bronze medal after a 7–3 win against Great Britain's Fay Henderson. Continuing their momentum from the season, Team Strouse finished 6–1 through the round robin at the 2023 United States Women's Curling Championship. In the 1 vs. 2 game, they faced the top ranked Tabitha Peterson rink where they gave up four in the tenth end to lose 11–10. They rebounded by beating Sarah Anderson 9–4 in the semi-final. They could not take revenge on Peterson in the final, however, dropping the game 8–5 and settling for the silver medal. At the 2023 United States Mixed Doubles Curling Championship, Mullaney and Sinnett finished 2–5 in pool play.

Beginning their season overseas, Team Strouse won the 2023 Euro Super Series to begin the 2023–24 season. Facing Italy's Stefania Constantini in the final, they scored three in the seventh end before stealing a single in the eighth to complete a 6–5 comeback. They also reached the final of their next event, the 2023 Icebreaker Challenge where they lost to Kate Cameron. After a semifinal finish at the 2023 Stu Sells Oakville Tankard, Team Strouse won the Mother Club Fall Curling Classic by winning seven straight games. In the championship game, they won 6–1 against Jolene Campbell. With all the points they accumulated in the first part of the season, the team qualified for the 2023 Tour Challenge Tier 2 Grand Slam of Curling event. There, they finished with a 2–2 record which was not enough to make the playoffs. They bounced back the following week, however, making it to the final of the Saville Grand Prix where they came up short against Selena Sturmay. They also made it to the semifinals of the Curl Mesabi Classic and the DeKalb Superspiel. Now ranked inside the top sixteen teams in the world, Team Strouse qualified for three Tier 1 Slam events. Despite winless records at the 2023 National and the 2024 Canadian Open, they finished 2–2 at the 2023 Masters. This qualified them for a tiebreaker which they lost to Sweden's Anna Hasselborg. The team ended the season at the 2024 United States Women's Curling Championship where they qualified for the playoffs with a 5–2 record. After defeating Miranda Scheel in the 3 vs. 4 game, they lost to the Sarah Anderson rink 11–7 in the semifinal.

== Personal life ==
Mullaney attended the Hubbard School of Journalism at the University of Minnesota. She previously attended Concord-Carlisle High School.

Mullaney is employed as a marketer and lives in Minneapolis.

She is also in a relationship with Scottish curler Angus Bryce.

== Teams ==
Season	Skip	Third	Second	Lead	Alternate
2014–15	Elizabeth Cousins	Elizabeth Pettee	Ivy Mancuso	Sydney Mullaney	Rebecca Rodgers
2015–16	Elizabeth Cousins	Ivy Mancuso	Rane Anderson	Sydney Mullaney	
2016–17	Elizabeth Cousins	Rane Anderson	Sailor Anderson	Sydney Mullaney	
2017–18	Elizabeth Cousins	Sydney Mullaney	Rane Anderson	Sailor Anderson	
2017–18	Susan Dudt	Rebecca Rodgers	Anna Cenzalli	Sydney Mullaney	
2018–19	Elizabeth Cousins	Katherine Gourianova	Elizabeth Janiak	Sydney Mullaney	
2018–19	Susan Dudt	Sydney Mullaney	Nadezhda Tschumakow	Alina Tschumakow	
2019–20	Delaney Strouse	Sydney Mullaney	Susan Dudt	Rebecca Rodgers	
2020–21	Delaney Strouse	Leah Yavarow	Sydney Mullaney	Rebecca Rodgers	Susan Dudt
2021–22	Delaney Strouse	Leah Yavarow	Sydney Mullaney	Rebecca Rodgers	Susan Dudt
2021–22	Delaney Strouse	Anne O'Hara	Sydney Mullaney	Rebecca Rodgers	Susan Dudt
2022–23	Delaney Strouse	Anne O'Hara	Sydney Mullaney	Rebecca Rodgers	Susan Dudt
2023–24	Delaney Strouse	Anne O'Hara	Sydney Mullaney	Rebecca Rodgers	Susan Dudt
2024–25	Delaney Strouse	Sarah Anderson	Sydney Mullaney	Anne O'Hara	
2025–26	Delaney Strouse	Anne O'Hara	Sydney Mullaney	Madison Bear	
2026–27	Anne O'Hara	Anya Normandeau	Sydney Mullaney	Ella Fleming	
