= 2023 Icebreaker Challenge =

- Host city: Morris, Manitoba
- Arena: Morris Curling Club
- Dates: August 25–27
- Winner: (Manitoba) Team Cameron
- Curling club: Granite CC, Winnipeg
- Skip: Kate Cameron
- Third: Meghan Walter
- Second: Taylor McDonald
- Lead: Mackenzie Elias
- Finalist: (United States) Delaney Strouse

The 2023 Icebreaker Challenge was held from August 25 to 27 at the Morris Curling Club in Morris, Manitoba. The event was held in a round robin format with a $6,500 purse.

In the final, Kate Cameron and her new Manitoba rink of Meghan Walter, Taylor McDonald and Mackenzie Elias capped off an undefeated week with an 8–6 win over the United States' Delaney Strouse. Trailing by two in the eighth, Cameron scored four to defeat the American squad that began their season by winning the 2023 Euro Super Series the week before. Sarah Anderson took third by defeating Kristy Watling 8–6 in the third-place game. In the seeding games, Rachel Workin finished fifth with a 10–3 win over Shaela Hayward while Katy Lukowich won 5–3 over Miranda Scheel in the seventh place game.

== Teams ==
The teams are listed as follows:

Skip	Third	Second	Lead	Alternate	Locale
Sarah Anderson	Taylor Anderson	Lexi Lanigan	Leah Yavarow		(United States) Minneapolis, Minnesota
Kate Cameron	Meghan Walter	Taylor McDonald	Mackenzie Elias		Winnipeg, Manitoba
Shaela Hayward	Keira Krahn	Rylie Cox	India Young		Carman, Manitoba
Katy Lukowich	Jaycee Terrick	Lexa Sigurdson	Julia Millan		Winnipeg, Manitoba
Miranda Scheel	Sara Olson	Jordan Hein	Tessa Thurlow		(United States) Fargo, North Dakota
Delaney Strouse	Anne O'Hara	Sydney Mullaney	Rebecca Rodgers	Susan Dudt	(United States) Traverse City, Michigan
Kristy Watling	Laura Burtnyk	Emily Deschenes	Sarah Pyke		Winnipeg, Manitoba
Rachel Workin	Ann Podoll	Anya Normandeau	Christina Lammers		(United States) Fargo, North Dakota

== Round robin standings ==
Final Round Robin Standings

Key
Teams to Playoffs

Pool A	W	L	PF	PA
(Manitoba) Kate Cameron	3	0	19	12
(United States) Sarah Anderson	2	1	18	12
(Manitoba) Shaela Hayward	1	2	18	21
(United States) Miranda Scheel	0	3	14	24

Pool B	W	L	PF	PA
(United States) Delaney Strouse	2	1	13	11
(Manitoba) Kristy Watling	2	1	17	15
(United States) Rachel Workin	2	1	13	13
(Manitoba) Katy Lukowich	0	3	14	18

== Round robin results ==
All draw times listed in Central Time (UTC−05:00).

=== Draw 1 ===
Friday, August 25, 7:00 pm

Sheet A	1	2	3	4	5	6	7	8	Final
(Manitoba) Kate Cameron	1	0	0	0	1	1	0	2	5
(Manitoba) Shaela Hayward	0	1	0	1	0	0	2	0	4

Sheet B	1	2	3	4	5	6	7	8	Final
(United States) Delaney Strouse	0	0	0	4	2	0	1	X	7
(Manitoba) Katy Lukowich	1	1	2	0	0	1	0	X	5

Sheet D	1	2	3	4	5	6	7	8	Final
(Manitoba) Kristy Watling	1	0	1	1	0	1	1	0	5
(United States) Rachel Workin	0	2	0	0	3	0	0	3	8

Sheet E	1	2	3	4	5	6	7	8	Final
(United States) Sarah Anderson	0	2	0	1	0	2	0	X	5
(United States) Miranda Scheel	0	0	1	0	0	0	2	X	3

=== Draw 2 ===
Saturday, August 26, 10:00 am

Sheet B	1	2	3	4	5	6	7	8	Final
(United States) Miranda Scheel	0	0	3	0	1	0	0	X	4
(Manitoba) Kate Cameron	2	3	0	2	0	0	1	X	8

Sheet C	1	2	3	4	5	6	7	8	Final
(United States) Sarah Anderson	3	0	0	3	0	0	3	X	9
(Manitoba) Shaela Hayward	0	1	0	0	1	1	0	X	3

Sheet E	1	2	3	4	5	6	7	8	9	Final
(Manitoba) Kristy Watling	2	0	2	0	0	0	2	0	1	7
(Manitoba) Katy Lukowich	0	2	0	1	1	1	0	1	0	6

Sheet F	1	2	3	4	5	6	7	8	Final
(United States) Delaney Strouse	0	1	2	0	2	0	X	X	5
(United States) Rachel Workin	0	0	0	0	0	1	X	X	1

=== Draw 3 ===
Saturday, August 26, 2:00 pm

Sheet A	1	2	3	4	5	6	7	8	Final
(United States) Delaney Strouse	0	1	0	0	0	0	X	X	1
(Manitoba) Kristy Watling	0	0	1	1	2	1	X	X	5

Sheet C	1	2	3	4	5	6	7	8	Final
(Manitoba) Katy Lukowich	0	1	0	0	0	1	1	X	3
(United States) Rachel Workin	1	0	1	1	1	0	0	X	4

Sheet D	1	2	3	4	5	6	7	8	Final
(United States) Sarah Anderson	1	0	2	0	0	0	1	X	4
(Manitoba) Kate Cameron	0	3	0	1	0	2	0	X	6

Sheet F	1	2	3	4	5	6	7	8	Final
(Manitoba) Shaela Hayward	2	2	0	0	3	0	1	3	11
(United States) Miranda Scheel	0	0	2	4	0	1	0	0	7

== Tiebreaker ==
Saturday, August 26, 6:00 pm

Sheet E	1	2	3	4	5	6	7	8	Final
(Manitoba) Kristy Watling	2	0	1	3	0	3	X	X	9
(United States) Rachel Workin	0	1	0	0	2	0	X	X	3

== Consolation ==
=== Fifth place game ===
Sunday, August 27, 10:00 am

Sheet E	1	2	3	4	5	6	7	8	Final
(United States) Rachel Workin	0	0	3	1	4	2	X	X	10
(Manitoba) Shaela Hayward	1	2	0	0	0	0	X	X	3

=== Seventh place game ===
Sunday, August 27, 10:00 am

Sheet F	1	2	3	4	5	6	7	8	Final
(United States) Miranda Scheel	1	0	1	0	1	0	0	0	3
(Manitoba) Katy Lukowich	0	1	0	1	0	1	1	1	5

== Playoffs ==
Semifinals
1	(Manitoba) Kate Cameron	6
4	(Manitoba) Kristy Watling	0
2	(United States) Delaney Strouse	6
3	(United States) Sarah Anderson	2

Final
1	(Manitoba) Kate Cameron	8
2	(United States) Delaney Strouse	6
Third place game
4	(Manitoba) Kristy Watling	6
3	(United States) Sarah Anderson	8

=== Semifinals ===
Sunday, August 27, 10:00 am

Sheet B	1	2	3	4	5	6	7	8	Final
(Manitoba) Kate Cameron	1	2	3	X	X	X	X	X	6
(Manitoba) Kristy Watling	0	0	0	X	X	X	X	X	0

Sheet C	1	2	3	4	5	6	7	8	Final
(United States) Delaney Strouse	1	0	0	0	2	3	X	X	6
(United States) Sarah Anderson	0	1	1	0	0	0	X	X	2

=== Third place game ===
Sunday, August 27, 1:30 pm

Sheet E	1	2	3	4	5	6	7	8	Final
(Manitoba) Kristy Watling	1	1	0	1	0	0	3	0	6
(United States) Sarah Anderson	0	0	1	0	2	3	0	2	8

=== Final ===
Sunday, August 27, 1:30 pm

Sheet D	1	2	3	4	5	6	7	8	Final
(Manitoba) Kate Cameron	0	1	1	0	2	0	0	4	8
(United States) Delaney Strouse	2	0	0	2	0	1	1	0	6
