= 2026 United States Women's Curling Championship =

Sporting Event

- Host city: Charlotte, North Carolina
- Arena: Bojangles Coliseum
- Dates: February 23 – March 1
- Winner: (Michigan) Team Strouse
- Curling club: Traverse City CC, Traverse City
- Skip: Delaney Strouse
- Third: Anne O'Hara
- Second: Sydney Mullaney
- Lead: Madison Bear
- Finalist: (New Hampshire) Elizabeth Cousins

The 2026 United States Women's Curling Championship was held from February 23 to March 1 at the Bojangles Coliseum in Charlotte, North Carolina. The event was held in conjunction with the 2026 United States Men's Curling Championship. The winning Delaney Strouse rink represented the United States at the 2026 World Women's Curling Championship at the Markin MacPhail Centre in Calgary, Alberta, Canada.

== Qualification process ==
The following teams qualified to participate in the 2026 national championship:

Qualification	Berths	Qualifying Team(s)
2025 United States Olympic Curling Trials	2*	(Michigan) Delaney Strouse (New Hampshire) Elizabeth Cousins
Qualifying Event (St. Paul Cash Spiel)	1	(Minnesota) Megan Stopera
Last Chance Qualifier	2	(North Dakota) Christine McMakin (Colorado) BriAnna Weldon
WCFRS Highest Ranked Team (December 26, 2025)	3	(Minnesota) Kim Rhyme (North Dakota) Ann Podoll (Massachusetts) Julia Pekowitz
TOTAL	8	

4 berths were initially awarded for qualifying for the 2025 United States Olympic Curling Trials. Team Tabitha Peterson declined their berth after qualifying to the 2026 Winter Olympics at the 2025 Olympic Qualification Event. Team Allory Johnson also declined their berth to play in the 2026 World Junior Curling Championships. The 2 declined berths plus an additional remaining berth were used to award berths the highest-ranked teams not already qualified determined based on team positions as of December 26th on the World Curling Team Ranking System (WCTRS)

== Teams ==
The teams are listed as follows:

Skip	Third	Second	Lead	Locale
Elizabeth Cousins	Annmarie Dubberstein	Allison Howell	Elizabeth Janiak	Nashua, New Hampshire
Christine McMakin	Jordan Hein	Susan Dudt	Tessa Thurlow	Fargo, North Dakota
Julia Pekowitz	Kalina Petrova	Lila Farwell	Alexa Pekowitz	Boston, Massachusetts
Ann Podoll	Rachel Kawleski	Mackenzie Ritchie	Rachel Workin	Fargo, North Dakota
Kim Rhyme	Stephanie Senneker	Libby Brundage	Anya Normandeau	Minneapolis, Minnesota
Megan Stopera	Addison Neill	Ella Fleming	Savannah Koch	Minneapolis, Minnesota
Delaney Strouse	Anne O'Hara	Sydney Mullaney	Madison Bear	Traverse City, Michigan
BriAnna Weldon	Sarah Walsh	Abigail Lin	Kate Garfinkel	San Francisco, Colorado

== Round robin standings ==
Final Round Robin Standings

Key
Teams to Playoffs

Team	W	L	W–L	PF	PA	EW	EL	BE	SE
(New Hampshire) Elizabeth Cousins	6	1	–	60	35	31	25	0	8
(Michigan) Delaney Strouse	4	3	2–0	67	53	35	27	4	14
(Minnesota) Kim Rhyme	4	3	1–1	45	47	26	27	2	9
(North Dakota) Ann Podoll	4	3	0–2	52	54	29	31	2	7
(Minnesota) Megan Stopera	3	4	1–0	38	42	29	27	6	7
(Massachusetts) Julia Pekowitz	3	4	0–1	45	49	27	30	3	9
(Colorado) BriAnna Weldon	2	5	1–0	36	64	24	33	0	7
(North Dakota) Christine McMakin	2	5	0–1	45	44	28	29	3	11

== Round robin results ==
All draw times are listed in Eastern Time (UTC−05:00).

=== Draw 1 ===
Tuesday, February 24, 9:00 am

Sheet A	1	2	3	4	5	6	7	8	9	10	Final
(Colorado) BriAnna Weldon	0	1	0	2	0	0	1	0	X	X	4
(New Hampshire) Elizabeth Cousins 🔨	2	0	1	0	4	2	0	2	X	X	11

Sheet B	1	2	3	4	5	6	7	8	9	10	Final
(Minnesota) Megan Stopera 🔨	0	2	0	1	0	2	0	0	0	0	5
(North Dakota) Ann Podoll	0	0	1	0	1	0	1	3	0	2	8

Sheet C	1	2	3	4	5	6	7	8	9	10	Final
(North Dakota) Christine McMakin 🔨	0	0	0	0	2	1	0	1	0	1	5
(Massachusetts) Julia Pekowitz	0	1	2	2	0	0	1	0	1	0	7

Sheet D	1	2	3	4	5	6	7	8	9	10	Final
(Minnesota) Kim Rhyme 🔨	0	2	0	2	0	0	0	3	0	X	7
(Michigan) Delaney Strouse	1	0	2	0	3	4	1	0	3	X	14

=== Draw 2 ===
Tuesday, February 24, 7:00 pm

Sheet A	1	2	3	4	5	6	7	8	9	10	Final
(North Dakota) Ann Podoll 🔨	0	2	0	2	1	0	1	0	1	X	7
(North Dakota) Christine McMakin	0	0	3	0	0	1	0	1	0	X	5

Sheet B	1	2	3	4	5	6	7	8	9	10	Final
(Colorado) BriAnna Weldon	2	0	3	0	1	0	1	0	2	1	10
(Michigan) Delaney Strouse 🔨	0	2	0	3	0	2	0	2	0	0	9

Sheet C	1	2	3	4	5	6	7	8	9	10	Final
(New Hampshire) Elizabeth Cousins	0	2	0	2	1	1	2	X	X	X	8
(Minnesota) Kim Rhyme 🔨	0	0	2	0	0	0	0	X	X	X	2

Sheet D	1	2	3	4	5	6	7	8	9	10	Final
(Minnesota) Megan Stopera 🔨	1	1	0	2	0	1	0	1	1	X	7
(Massachusetts) Julia Pekowitz	0	0	1	0	1	0	1	0	0	X	3

=== Draw 3 ===
Wednesday, February 25, 12:00 pm

Sheet A	1	2	3	4	5	6	7	8	9	10	Final
(Massachusetts) Julia Pekowitz 🔨	1	0	1	1	1	0	2	4	X	X	10
(Colorado) BriAnna Weldon	0	2	0	0	0	1	0	0	X	X	3

Sheet B	1	2	3	4	5	6	7	8	9	10	Final
(Minnesota) Kim Rhyme 🔨	2	0	0	1	0	2	0	0	1	1	7
(Minnesota) Megan Stopera	0	0	1	0	1	0	1	1	0	0	4

Sheet C	1	2	3	4	5	6	7	8	9	10	Final
(Michigan) Delaney Strouse	0	0	2	0	3	1	1	2	1	X	10
(North Dakota) Ann Podoll 🔨	0	2	0	4	0	0	0	0	0	X	6

Sheet D	1	2	3	4	5	6	7	8	9	10	Final
(North Dakota) Christine McMakin 🔨	1	0	0	1	0	1	0	X	X	X	3
(New Hampshire) Elizabeth Cousins	0	2	3	0	1	0	4	X	X	X	10

=== Draw 4 ===
Wednesday, February 25, 8:00 pm

Sheet A	1	2	3	4	5	6	7	8	9	10	Final
(Minnesota) Megan Stopera 🔨	0	1	2	0	0	2	0	0	1	1	7
(Michigan) Delaney Strouse	0	0	0	3	2	0	0	1	0	0	6

Sheet B	1	2	3	4	5	6	7	8	9	10	Final
(New Hampshire) Elizabeth Cousins 🔨	0	2	0	1	0	4	0	0	1	2	10
(Massachusetts) Julia Pekowitz	1	0	2	0	3	0	0	1	0	0	7

Sheet C	1	2	3	4	5	6	7	8	9	10	Final
(Colorado) BriAnna Weldon	0	1	1	0	0	0	0	2	1	1	6
(North Dakota) Christine McMakin 🔨	0	0	0	1	1	1	1	0	0	0	4

Sheet D	1	2	3	4	5	6	7	8	9	10	Final
(North Dakota) Ann Podoll	0	1	0	0	1	0	4	0	0	1	7
(Minnesota) Kim Rhyme 🔨	2	0	2	1	0	2	0	1	1	0	9

=== Draw 5 ===
Thursday, February 26, 2:00 pm

Sheet A	1	2	3	4	5	6	7	8	9	10	Final
(New Hampshire) Elizabeth Cousins 🔨	1	0	0	0	1	0	1	0	3	X	6
(North Dakota) Ann Podoll	0	1	1	2	0	1	0	3	0	X	8

Sheet B	1	2	3	4	5	6	7	8	9	10	Final
(North Dakota) Christine McMakin 🔨	0	0	2	1	3	0	1	2	X	X	9
(Minnesota) Kim Rhyme	0	1	0	0	0	0	0	0	X	X	1

Sheet C	1	2	3	4	5	6	7	8	9	10	Final
(Massachusetts) Julia Pekowitz 🔨	0	1	0	3	0	0	1	0	0	X	5
(Michigan) Delaney Strouse	2	0	0	0	1	3	0	1	4	X	11

Sheet D	1	2	3	4	5	6	7	8	9	10	Final
(Colorado) BriAnna Weldon 🔨	1	0	1	0	0	0	0	X	X	X	2
(Minnesota) Megan Stopera	0	3	0	0	3	1	1	X	X	X	8

=== Draw 6 ===
Friday, February 27, 9:00 am

Sheet A	1	2	3	4	5	6	7	8	9	10	Final
(Minnesota) Kim Rhyme 🔨	1	0	1	2	3	0	3	X	X	X	10
(Massachusetts) Julia Pekowitz	0	1	0	0	0	3	0	X	X	X	4

Sheet B	1	2	3	4	5	6	7	8	9	10	Final
(North Dakota) Ann Podoll	0	2	0	3	0	0	2	2	0	4	13
(Colorado) BriAnna Weldon 🔨	2	0	2	0	2	1	0	0	3	0	10

Sheet D	1	2	3	4	5	6	7	8	9	10	11	Final
(Michigan) Delaney Strouse 🔨	0	1	0	3	1	0	0	1	0	3	1	10
(North Dakota) Christine McMakin	0	0	2	0	0	4	1	0	2	0	0	9

Friday, February 27, 12:00 pm

Sheet C	1	2	3	4	5	6	7	8	9	10	Final
(Minnesota) Megan Stopera 🔨	1	0	0	0	1	0	1	0	1	X	4
(New Hampshire) Elizabeth Cousins	0	2	0	1	0	2	0	1	0	X	6

=== Draw 7 ===
Friday, February 27, 8:00 pm

Sheet A	1	2	3	4	5	6	7	8	9	10	Final
(North Dakota) Christine McMakin	0	1	1	0	4	0	1	3	X	X	10
(Minnesota) Megan Stopera 🔨	1	0	0	1	0	1	0	0	X	X	3

Sheet B	1	2	3	4	5	6	7	8	9	10	Final
(Michigan) Delaney Strouse 🔨	0	1	1	0	1	0	2	0	2	0	7
(New Hampshire) Elizabeth Cousins	0	0	0	4	0	2	0	1	0	2	9

Sheet C	1	2	3	4	5	6	7	8	9	10	Final
(Minnesota) Kim Rhyme 🔨	2	2	0	3	1	1	X	X	X	X	9
(Colorado) BriAnna Weldon	0	0	1	0	0	0	X	X	X	X	1

Sheet D	1	2	3	4	5	6	7	8	9	10	Final
(Massachusetts) Julia Pekowitz 🔨	0	0	0	2	0	1	0	1	5	X	9
(North Dakota) Ann Podoll	0	0	1	0	1	0	1	0	0	X	3

== Playoffs ==
Page playoff system
1	(New Hampshire) Elizabeth Cousins	6
2	(Michigan) Delaney Strouse	5
3	(Minnesota) Kim Rhyme	8
4	(North Dakota) Ann Podoll	7

Semifinal
2	(Michigan) Delaney Strouse	8
3	(Minnesota) Kim Rhyme	4

Final
1	(New Hampshire) Elizabeth Cousins	6
2	(Michigan) Delaney Strouse	9

=== 1 vs. 2 ===
Saturday, February 28, 7:00 pm

Sheet C	1	2	3	4	5	6	7	8	9	10	Final
(New Hampshire) Elizabeth Cousins 🔨	2	0	0	1	1	0	0	1	0	1	6
(Michigan) Delaney Strouse	0	2	0	0	0	2	1	0	0	0	5

=== 3 vs. 4 ===
Saturday, February 28, 7:00 pm

Sheet D	1	2	3	4	5	6	7	8	9	10	11	Final
(Minnesota) Kim Rhyme 🔨	1	0	1	1	0	0	3	0	1	0	1	8
(North Dakota) Ann Podoll	0	1	0	0	2	1	0	1	0	2	0	7

=== Semifinal ===
Sunday, March 1, 10:00 am

Sheet B	1	2	3	4	5	6	7	8	9	10	Final
(Michigan) Delaney Strouse 🔨	0	2	0	1	1	1	0	0	1	2	8
(Minnesota) Kim Rhyme	1	0	1	0	0	0	2	0	0	0	4

=== Final ===
Sunday, March 1, 4:00 pm

Sheet D	1	2	3	4	5	6	7	8	9	10	Final
(New Hampshire) Elizabeth Cousins 🔨	0	0	2	0	1	1	0	2	0	X	6
(Michigan) Delaney Strouse	0	2	0	3	0	0	2	0	2	X	9

2026 United States Women's Curling Championship

Delaney Strouse
1st United States Championship title
