= 2019 United States Mixed Curling Championship =

- Host city: Denver, Colorado
- Dates: March 24 - 30
- Winner: (Maryland) Grand National 1
- Curling club: Potomac CC, Potomac, MD
- Skip: Hunter Clawson
- Third: Katherine Gourianova
- Second: Eli Clawson
- Lead: Sydney Mullaney
- Finalist: (New York (state)) Grand National 2 Rochester, NY (Caitlin Pulli)

The 2019 United States Mixed Curling Championship was held from March 24 to 30 in Denver, Colorado.

The winning team earned the right to represent the United States at the 2019 World Mixed Curling Championship in Aberdeen, Scotland.

== Teams ==
Ten teams qualified to participate in the 2019 national championship.

Team	Skip	Third	Second	Lead	Locale
Dakota Territory	Evan Workin	Rachel Workin	Jordan Brown	Christina Lammers	Fargo, North Dakota
Grand National 1	Hunter Clawson	Katherine Gourianova	Eli Clawson	Sydney Mullaney	Potomac, Maryland
Grand National 2	Caitlin Pulli	Jeff Pulli	Rebecca Andrew	Jason Scott	Rochester, New York
Great Lakes	Sean Murray	Stephanie Senneker	Dan Wiza	Emilia Juocys	Port Huron, Michigan
Mid-America	Aaron Johnston	Clare Moores	Lance Wheeler	Miriam Moller	Greenwood Village, Colorado
Midwest	David Durrant	Sara Gaum	Adam Miller	Elisabeth Collins	Chicago, Illinois
Minnesota	Tyler George	Courtney George	Derek Benson	Jordan Moulton	Duluth, Minnesota
Mountain Pacific	Doug Schaak	Elaine Smith-Koop	Thomas Poon	Rhiannon Avery	Vancouver, Washington
Washington	Thomas Lee	Jiyoung Lee	Phil Shryock	Jacqueline Clark	Lynnwood, Washington
Wisconsin	Ben Richardson	Jenna Burchesky	Jon Harstad	Allison Howell	Eau Claire, Wisconsin

== Round-robin results and standings ==
Key
Teams to playoffs
Teams to Tiebreaker for 4th place

	Team	Skip	1	2	3	4	5	6	7	8	9	10	W	L	Place
1	(North Dakota) Dakota Territory	Evan Workin	*	4:5	5:3	6:4	8:1	8:2	9:1	9:3	5:1	4:10	7	2	1
2	(Maryland) Grand National 1	Hunter Clawson	5:4	*	5:6	3:4	8:4	6:5	7:2	9:2	11:3	5:7	6	3	4
3	(New York (state)) Grand National 2	Caitlin Pulli	3:5	6:5	*	9:8	7:5	5:4	5:7	11:0	7:2	7:4	7	2	2
4	(Michigan) Great Lakes	Sean Murray	4:6	4:3	8:9	*	8:0	6:1	7:4	8:0	6:2	7:5	7	2	3
5	(Colorado) Mid-America	Aaron Johnston	1:8	4:8	5:7	0:8	*	8:7	6:5	10:0	10:3	5:7	4	5	6
6	(Illinois) Midwest	David Durrant	2:8	5:6	4:5	1:6	7:8	*	9:4	9:2	3:4	6:4	3	6	7
7	Minnesota	Tyler George	1:9	2:7	7:5	4:7	5:6	4:9	*	9:1	7:1	5:6	3	6	8
8	(Washington (state)) Mountain Pacific	Doug Schaak	3:9	2:9	0:11	0:8	0:10	2:9	1:9	*	0:7	2:10	0	9	10
9	(Washington (state)) Washington	Thomas Lee	1:5	3:11	2:7	2:6	3:10	4:3	1:7	7:0	*	3:10	2	7	9
10	Wisconsin	Ben Richardson	10:4	7:5	4:7	5:7	7:5	4:6	6:5	10:2	10:3	*	6	3	4

=== Tiebreaker ===
Team	1	2	3	4	5	6	7	8	Final
Wisconsin (Richardson)	0	0	0	0	0	2	0	X	2
Grand National 1 (Clawson)	0	1	1	1	3	0	1	X	7

== Playoffs ==
Semifinals
1	Dakota Territory (Workin)	6
4	Grand National 1 (Clawson)	7
2	Grand National 2 (Pulli)	8
3	Great Lakes (Murray)	6

Gold-medal game
Grand National 1 (Clawson)	9
Grand National 2 (Pulli)	5
Bronze-medal game
Dakota Territory (Workin)	8
Great Lakes (Murray)	5

All draw times are listed in Mountain Time (UTC−7)

=== Semifinals ===
March 29, 7:30pm

Team	1	2	3	4	5	6	7	8	9	Final
Grand National 1 (Clawson)	0	1	0	2	1	0	2	0	1	7
Dakota Territory (Workin)	1	0	1	0	0	2	0	2	0	6

Team	1	2	3	4	5	6	7	8	Final
Grand National 2 (Pulli)	1	1	0	0	3	3	0	X	8
Great Lakes (Murray)	0	0	1	2	0	0	3	X	6

=== Bronze-medal game ===
March 30, 2:00pm

Team	1	2	3	4	5	6	7	8	Final
Dakota Territory (Workin)	2	0	1	0	2	0	1	2	8
Great Lakes (Murray)	0	1	0	2	0	2	0	0	5

=== Gold-medal game ===
March 30, 2:00pm

Team	1	2	3	4	5	6	7	8	Final
Grand National 2 (Pulli)	0	3	0	1	0	1	0	0	5
Grand National 1 (Clawson)	2	0	1	0	1	0	3	2	9

== Final standings ==
Place	Team	Skip	Games	Wins	Losses
1st place, gold medalist(s)	Grand National 1	Hunter Clawson	12	9	3
2nd place, silver medalist(s)	Grand National 2	Caitlin Pulli	11	8	3
3rd place, bronze medalist(s)	Dakota Territory	Evan Workin	11	8	3
4	Great Lakes	Sean Murray	11	7	4
5	Wisconsin	Ben Richardson	10	6	4
6	Mid-America	Aaron Johnston	9	4	5
7	Midwest	David Durrant	9	3	6
8	Minnesota	Tyler George	9	3	6
9	Washington	Thomas Lee	9	2	7
10	Mountain Pacific	Doug Schaak	9	0	9
