= Anne O'Hara =

American curler (born 2002)

- Curler
- Born: October 14, 2002 (age 24); Anchorage, Alaska, U.S.

Team
- Curling club: Fairbanks CC, Fairbanks, AK
- Skip: Anne O'Hara
- Third: Anya Normandeau
- Second: Sydney Mullaney
- Lead: Ella Fleming

Curling career
- Member Association: United States
- World Championship: 1 (2026)
Medal record
Women's curling
Representing United States
World Junior Championships
Bronze medal – third place	2022 Jönköping
Winter Universiade
Bronze medal – third place	2023 Saranac Lake
United States Women's Championship
Gold medal – first place	2026 Charlotte
Silver medal – second place	2023 Denver
Bronze medal – third place	2024 East Rutherford
Arctic Winter Games
Bronze medal – third place	2014 Fairbanks

Anne Kirsten O'Hara (born October 14, 2002, in Anchorage) is an American curler, originally from Fairbanks, Alaska. She currently skips her own team out of Chaska, Minnesota. She won the bronze medal for the United States at the 2022 World Junior Curling Championships and the 2023 Winter World University Games.

== Career ==
In 2014, O'Hara competed in the 2014 Arctic Winter Games as lead for the Alaskan team led by Cora Farrell. At the event, the team finished in third place and won the bronze medal. Two years later, the team represented Alaska internationally at the 2016 U18 International Curling Championships, missing the playoffs with a 2–3 record.

For the next three seasons, her team, now led by Ariel Traxler, competed in the United States Junior Curling Championships but were unsuccessful in reaching the playoffs. During the 2019–20 season, she played in the qualifiers for the 2020 Winter Youth Olympics as lead for the Kevin Tuma rink. After going undefeated in the round robin, the team lost in the semifinals and were eliminated. At the junior championships, her team started with four straight wins before losing their last three games, missing the playoffs for a fourth consecutive year. Later in the season, she competed in her first United States Women's Curling Championship as lead for the Patti Lank rink. At the championship, the team finished with a 3–4 record, just missing the playoffs.

The following season, her junior team of Traxler, Elizabeth Janiak and Sara Olson qualified for the 2021 United States Women's Curling Championship which was held in a bio-secure bubble at the Wausau Curling Club in Wausau, Wisconsin in May 2021. They finished with a 1–5 record, not advancing to the playoffs. O'Hara also played in the bubble for the 2021 United States Mixed Doubles Curling Championship with partner Coleman Thurston where they went 2–3.

Team Traxler, which became Team Olson in the off-season, began the 2021–22 season by finishing second at the 2021 U.S. junior championship. After going 4–1 in the round robin, they beat Andie McDonald in the semifinal before losing to Delaney Strouse in the gold medal game. After the event, O'Hara was added to the Strouse rink as their new third, replacing Leah Yavarow ahead of the 2021 United States Olympic curling trials. At the Trials, they finished tied for fifth with a 3–7 record. As a member of Team Strouse, O'Hara became part of the national junior team. In January 2022, the team was set to compete in the 2022 World Junior-B Curling Championships, however, an outbreak of COVID cases in the men's event forced the women's event to be cancelled. Because of this, the World Curling Federation named the top three ranked nations who had not already qualified for the world championship as the qualifiers, with the United States being one of them. In May 2022, they represented the U.S. at the 2022 World Junior Curling Championships. Through the round robin, the team finished in second place with a 7–2 record, suffering losses to Latvia's Evelīna Barone and the top ranked Norway's Eirin Mesloe. In the semifinals, they met the eventual champions Japan's Sae Yamamoto where they fell 7–3. They bounced back in the bronze medal game, however, beating Norway in a 10–6 game. Also during the season, O'Hara's Alaskan junior team finished third at the 2022 U.S. juniors, being eliminated in the semifinal game. O'Hara and Thurston teamed up again for the 2022 United States Mixed Doubles Curling Championship where they lost in the final qualifying event.

Joining Strouse fulltime for the 2022–23 season, O'Hara found major success, beginning at the US Open of Curling where they had an undefeated run until the final where they were defeated by Ha Seung-youn. They also qualified for the playoffs in their next event, the 2022 Stu Sells Toronto Tankard, before falling in the quarterfinals to Lauren Mann. The team next played in the playdowns for the 2023 Winter World University Games where they won all four of their games to win the event. Back on tour, they had four more playoff appearances, reaching three quarterfinals and one semifinal at the Curling Stadium Contender Series. In the new year, the team represented the U.S. on home soil at the 2023 Winter World University Games in Saranac Lake, New York. The team was dominant through the round robin, with Strouse, O'Hara, Sydney Mullaney, Rebecca Rodgers and Susan Dudt securing an 8–1 record, finishing just behind Korea's Ha Seung-youn who was their sole loss. In the semifinals, they met China's Han Yu where they suffered a narrow 6–5 loss. They would claim the bronze medal after a 7–3 win against Great Britain's Fay Henderson. Continuing their momentum from the season, Team Strouse finished 6–1 through the round robin at the 2023 United States Women's Curling Championship. In the 1 vs. 2 game, they faced the top ranked Tabitha Peterson rink where they gave up four in the tenth end to lose 11–10. They rebounded by beating Sarah Anderson 9–4 in the semifinal. They could not take revenge on Peterson in the final, however, dropping the game 8–5 and settling for the silver medal. Also during the 2022–23 season, O'Hara joined the Tessa Thurlow rink as their alternate for the 2023 World Junior Curling Championships in her final year of junior eligibility. There, the team had mixed results, placing seventh at the end of the competition with a 3–6 record. O'Hara played in five of the teams nine games.

Beginning their season overseas, Team Strouse won the 2023 Euro Super Series to begin the 2023–24 season. Facing Italy's Stefania Constantini in the final, they scored three in the seventh end before stealing a single in the eighth to complete a 6–5 comeback. They also reached the final of their next event, the 2023 Icebreaker Challenge where they lost to Kate Cameron. After a semifinal finish at the 2023 Stu Sells Oakville Tankard, Team Strouse won the Mother Club Fall Curling Classic by winning seven straight games. In the championship game, they won 6–1 against Jolene Campbell. With all the points they accumulated in the first part of the season, the team qualified for the 2023 Tour Challenge Tier 2 Grand Slam of Curling event. There, they finished with a 2–2 record which was not enough to make the playoffs. They bounced back the following week, however, making it to the final of the Saville Grand Prix where they came up short against Selena Sturmay. They also made it to the semifinals of the Curl Mesabi Classic and the DeKalb Superspiel. Now ranked inside the top sixteen teams in the world, Team Strouse qualified for three Tier 1 Slam events. Despite winless records at the 2023 National and the 2024 Canadian Open, they finished 2–2 at the 2023 Masters. This qualified them for a tiebreaker which they lost to Sweden's Anna Hasselborg. The team ended the season at the 2024 United States Women's Curling Championship where they qualified for the playoffs with a 5–2 record. After defeating Miranda Scheel in the 3 vs. 4 game, they lost to the Sarah Anderson rink 11–7 in the semifinal.

== Personal life ==
O'Hara attended the Minnesota State University, Mankato. She previously attended West Valley High School. She began curling at the age of four. She currently works as a community health educator and lives in Burnsville, Minnesota.

== Grand Slam record ==
Key
C	Champion
F	Lost in Final
SF	Lost in Semifinal
QF	Lost in Quarterfinals
R16	Lost in the round of 16
Q	Did not advance to playoffs
T2	Played in Tier 2 event
DNP	Did not participate in event
N/A	Not a Grand Slam event that season

Event	2023–24	2024–25	2025–26	2026–27
Invitational	T2	Q	DNP	DNP
Masters	Q	DNP	T2	DNP
National	Q	DNP	DNP	Q
Open	Q	DNP	DNP	DNP

== Teams ==
Season	Skip	Third	Second	Lead	Alternate
2013–14	Cora Farrell	Ariel Traxler	Naimy Schommer	Anne O'Hara	
2014–15	Cora Farrell	Ariel Traxler	Naimy Schommer	Anne O'Hara	
2015–16	Cora Farrell	Ariel Traxler	Naimy Schommer	Anne O'Hara	
2016–17	Ariel Traxler	Sidney Schroeder	Anne O'Hara	Naimy Schommer	Andie McDonald
2017–18	Ariel Traxler	Sidney Schroeder	Andie McDonald	Anne O'Hara	
2018–19	Suzanna Viau	Anna Netteberg	Anne O'Hara	Emma Rau	
2019–20	Christina McMakin	Anna Netteberg	Anne O'Hara	Emma Rau	Maggie Payette
2020–21	Elizabeth Janiak (Fourth)	Sara Olson	Anne O'Hara	Ariel Traxler (Skip)	Katherine Gourianova
2021–22	Elizabeth Janiak (Fourth)	Anne O'Hara	Sara Olson (Skip)	Kaitlin Murphy	
2021–22	Delaney Strouse	Anne O'Hara	Sydney Mullaney	Rebecca Rodgers	Susan Dudt
2022–23	Delaney Strouse	Anne O'Hara	Sydney Mullaney	Rebecca Rodgers	Susan Dudt
2023–24	Delaney Strouse	Anne O'Hara	Sydney Mullaney	Rebecca Rodgers	Susan Dudt
2024–25	Delaney Strouse	Sarah Anderson	Sydney Mullaney	Anne O'Hara	
2025–26	Delaney Strouse	Anne O'Hara	Sydney Mullaney	Madison Bear	
2026–27	Anne O'Hara	Anya Normandeau	Sydney Mullaney	Ella Fleming	
