= US Open of Curling =

- Established: 2014
- Host city: Blaine, Minnesota
- Arena: Four Seasons Curling Club
- Men's purse: $8,000 (US)
- Women's purse: $8,000 (US)

Current champions (2023)
- Men: (United States) Daniel Casper
- Women: (United States) Tabitha Peterson

The Curve US Open of Curling is an annual bonspiel, or curling tournament, held at the Four Seasons Curling Club in Blaine, Minnesota. It was held as part of the men's World Curling Tour from 2014 to 2019 and as part of the women's WCT from 2016 to 2019, though women's teams were invited to participate in the 2014 event. The purse for the event is $8,000 USD on both the men's and women's sides.

== Past Champions ==
=== Men ===
Year	Winning team	Runner-up team	Purse (USD)
2014	(China) Ba Dexin, Xu Xiamong, Zang Jialing, Liu Rui	(Manitoba) Scott Ramsay, Mark Taylor, Ross McFadyen, Kyle Werenich	$23,000
2015	(Saskatchewan) Steve Laycock, Kirk Muyres, Colton Flasch, Gerry Adam	(Manitoba) Reid Carruthers, Braeden Moskowy, Derek Samagalski, Colin Hodgson	$23,000
2016	(Ontario) John Epping, Mathew Camm, Patrick Janssen, Tim March	(Minnesota) Craig Brown, Kroy Nernberger, Jared Zezel, Sean Beighton	$25,000
2017	(Manitoba) Matt Dunstone, Alex Forrest, Ian McMillan, Connor Njegovan	(Manitoba) William Lyburn, Jared Kolomaya, Richard Daneault, Braden Zawada	$19,000
2018 (Jan.)	(Minnesota) Heath McCormick, Christopher Plys, Korey Dropkin, Thomas Howell	(Saskatchewan) Adam Casey, Brock Montgomery, Shaun Meachem, Dustin Kidby	$17,000
2018 (Dec.)	(South Korea) Kim Soo-hyuk, Jeong Byeong-jin, Lee Jeong-jae, Lee Dong-hyeong	(Ontario) Mike McCarville, Jordan Potter, Zach Warkentin, Travis Potter	$15,000
2019	(Minnesota) Greg Persinger (Fourth), Rich Ruohonen (Skip), Colin Hufman, Phil Tilker	(Minnesota) Korey Dropkin, Thomas Howell, Mark Fenner, Alex Fenson	$11,400
2020	Cancelled		
2021	(Minnesota) Luc Violette, Chase Sinnett, Ben Richardson, Jon Harstad	(Pennsylvania) Scott Dunnam, Hunter Clawson, Cody Clouser, Andrew Dunnam, Daniel Dudt	$9,500
2022	(Minnesota) Korey Dropkin, Andrew Stopera, Mark Fenner, Thomas Howell	(Minnesota) Daniel Casper, Luc Violette, Ben Richardson, Chase Sinnett	$14,000
2023	(Minnesota) Daniel Casper, Luc Violette, Ben Richardson, Chase Sinnett	(Minnesota) Korey Dropkin (Fourth), Andrew Stopera (Skip), Mark Fenner, Thomas Howell	$8,000

=== Men's Contender Round ===
Beginning in 2019, a "contender" round was held a week prior to the main event. It was excluded from the Tour in 2020.

Year	Winning team	Runner-up team	Purse (USD)
2019	(Pennsylvania) Scott Dunnam, Alex Leichter, Cody Clouser, Andrew Dunnam	(Ontario) Jordan Chandler, Trevor Bonot, Colin Koivula, Kyle Chandler	$10,600
2020	(Minnesota) Rich Ruohonen, Andrew Stopera, Colin Hufman, Kroy Nernberger	(Minnesota) Korey Dropkin, Joe Polo, Mark Fenner, Thomas Howell	$10,000
2021	(Pennsylvania) Scott Dunnam, Hunter Clawson, Cody Clouser, Andrew Dunnam, Daniel Dudt	(Alaska) Greg Persinger, Dominik Märki, Alex Leichter, Shawn Banyai	$6,000
2022–2023	Cancelled		

=== Women ===
Year	Winning team	Runner-up team	Purse (USD)
2016	(Ontario) Krista McCarville, Kendra Lilly, Ashley Sippala, Sarah Potts	(China) Liu Sijia, Liu Jinli, Wang Rui, Yu Xinna	$20,000
2017	(Ontario) Sherry Middaugh, Jo-Ann Rizzo, Lee Merklinger, Leigh Armstrong	(Wisconsin) Nina Roth, Tabitha Peterson, Aileen Geving, Becca Hamilton	$19,000
2018	(Minnesota) Jamie Sinclair, Alexandra Carlson, Vicky Persinger, Monica Walker	(Minnesota) Nina Roth, Tabitha Peterson, Aileen Geving, Becca Hamilton	$14,200
2019	(Wisconsin) Nina Roth, Tabitha Peterson, Becca Hamilton, Aileen Geving	(Minnesota) Cassie Potter, Courtney George, Sophie Bader, Jordan Moulton	$6,500
2020	Cancelled		
2021	(Minnesota) Tabitha Peterson, Nina Roth, Becca Hamilton, Tara Peterson, Aileen Geving	(North Carolina) Jamie Sinclair, Monica Walker, Cora Farrell, Elizabeth Cousins	$7,000
2022	(South Korea) Ha Seung-youn, Kim Hye-rin, Yang Tae-i, Kim Su-jin	(Minnesota) Delaney Strouse, Anne O'Hara, Sydney Mullaney, Rebecca Rodgers	$14,000
2023	(Minnesota) Tabitha Peterson, Cory Thiesse, Becca Hamilton, Tara Peterson	(Minnesota) Sarah Anderson, Taylor Anderson, Lexi Lanigan, Leah Yavarow	$8,000

=== Women's Contender Round ===
A women's contender round began in 2020. It was not a Tour event.

Year	Winning team	Runner-up team	Purse (USD)
2020	(Michigan) Delaney Strouse, Leah Yavarow, Sydney Mullaney, Rebecca Rodgers	(North Dakota) Rachel Workin, Lexi Lanigan, Ann Podoll, Christina Lammers	$7,000
2021	(Minnesota) Kim Rhyme, Libby Brundage, Cait Flannery, Katie Rhyme	(North Dakota) Rachel Workin, Lexi Lanigan, Ann Podoll, Christina Lammers	$6,000
2022–2023	Cancelled		

=== Mixed doubles ===
A mixed doubles event was added in 2021.

Year	Winning pair	Runner-up pair	Purse (USD)
2021	(Massachusetts) Monica Walker / Alex Leichter	(Minnesota) Tabitha Peterson / Joe Polo	$7,000
2022–2023	Cancelled		
