= 2023 Euro Super Series =

- Host city: Stirling, Scotland
- Arena: National Curling Academy
- Dates: 17–20 August (Women's); 24–27 August (Men's)
- Men's winner: (Scotland) Team Mouat
- Curling club: Gogar Park CC, Edinburgh
- Skip: Bruce Mouat
- Third: Grant Hardie
- Second: Bobby Lammie
- Lead: Hammy McMillan Jr.
- Coach: Michael Goodfellow
- Finalist: (Scotland) Ross Whyte
- Women's winner: (United States) Team Strouse
- Skip: Delaney Strouse
- Third: Anne O'Hara
- Second: Sydney Mullaney
- Lead: Rebecca Rodgers
- Alternate: Susan Dudt
- Finalist: (Italy) Stefania Constantini

The 2023 Euro Super Series is a curling event among various countries of Europe. It was held from 17 to 27 August at the National Curling Academy in Stirling, Scotland. The women's event ran from 17 to 20 August with the men's event running from 24 to 27 August. The total purse for the event is £ 20,000 on both the men's and women's sides.

In the men's event, the reigning world champion Bruce Mouat rink of Grant Hardie, Bobby Lammie and Hammy McMillan Jr. won 8–5 over Scottish rivals Ross Whyte. Team Mouat finished 3–1 through the qualifying round before defeating James Craik in the quarterfinals and Cameron Bryce in the semifinals. The Whyte rink were the top qualifiers with a 4–0 record and scored wins over Kyle Waddell and Korey Dropkin to qualify for the championship game. Switzerland's Michael Brunner and Norway's Lukas Høstmælingen rounded out the eight team playoff round.

In the women's event, Delaney Strouse led her USA squad of Anne O'Hara, Sydney Mullaney, Rebecca Rodgers and Susan Dudt to victory, scoring three in the seventh and stealing one in the eighth to clip Italy's Stefania Constantini 6–5 in the final. Team Strouse finished 3–1 through the round robin to earn the top seed in their pool and a bye to the semifinals. There, they won 6–3 over Scotland's Robyn Munro. The Constantini rink finished first through their pool with an undefeated 4–0 record and then won 5–3 over Marianne Rørvik to advance to the final. Rebecca Morrison and Michèle Jäggi both lost in the quarterfinals. 2022 Olympic gold medallist Eve Muirhead spared at third for the Jäggi rink, her first competitive curling competition since the end of the 2021–22 season when she announced her retirement.

== Men ==
=== Teams ===
The teams are listed as follows:

Skip	Third	Second	Lead	Alternate	Locale
Michael Brunner	Anthony Petoud	Romano Meier	Andreas Gerlach		Bern, Switzerland
Cameron Bryce	Duncan Menzies	Luke Carson	Robin McCall		Border, Scotland
Orrin Carson	Logan Carson	Archie Hyslop	Charlie Gibb		Stirling, Scotland
James Craik	Mark Watt	Angus Bryce	Blair Haswell		Forfar, Scotland
Ross Craik	Scott Hyslop	Struan Carson	Jack Carrick		Stirling, Scotland
Jacob Dobson	Noah Garner	Kevin Genjaga	Matthew Abrams		Ottawa, Ontario, Canada
Korey Dropkin (Fourth)	Andrew Stopera (Skip)	Mark Fenner	Thomas Howell		(United States) Duluth, Minnesota
Wouter Gösgens	Laurens Hoekman	Jaap van Dorp	Tobias van den Hurk	Alexander Magan	Zoetermeer, Netherlands
Andreas Hårstad	Mathias Brænden	Michael Mellemseter	Willhelm Næss		Oppdal, Norway
Marco Hösli	Philipp Hösli	Simon Gloor	Justin Hausherr		Glarus, Switzerland
Lukas Høstmælingen	Grunde Buraas	Magnus Lillebø	Tinius Haslev Nordbye		Oslo, Norway
Benny Kapp	Felix Messenzehl	Johannes Scheuerl	Mario Trevisol	Marc Muskatewitz	Füssen, Germany
Bruce Mouat	Grant Hardie	Bobby Lammie	Hammy McMillan Jr.		Stirling, Scotland
Fredrik Nyman	Patric Mabergs	Simon Olofsson	Johannes Patz		Sollefteå, Sweden
Magnus Ramsfjell	Martin Sesaker	Bendik Ramsfjell	Gaute Nepstad		Trondheim, Norway
Andrin Schnider	Dean Hürlimann	Marco Hefti	Nicola Stoll		Schaffhausen, Switzerland
Yves Stocker	Kim Schwaller	Felix Eberhard	Tom Winkelhausen		Zug, Switzerland
Arran Thomson	Stewart Kyle	Lewis McCabe	Sam McConnachie		Perth, Scotland
Kyle Waddell	Craig Waddell	Mark Taylor	Gavin Barr		Hamilton, Scotland
Ross Whyte	Robin Brydone	Duncan McFadzean	Euan Kyle		Stirling, Scotland

=== Round robin standings ===
Final Round Robin Standings

Key
Teams to Playoffs

Group A	W	L	PF	PA
(Scotland) Bruce Mouat	3	1	29	17
(Scotland) Kyle Waddell	2	2	21	27
(Switzerland) Yves Stocker	2	2	26	22
(Sweden) Fredrik Nyman	2	2	22	24
(Scotland) Ross Craik	1	3	19	27

Group B	W	L	PF	PA
(Scotland) Ross Whyte	4	0	32	17
(Switzerland) Michael Brunner	3	1	28	16
(Germany) Benny Kapp	2	2	26	24
(Norway) Andreas Hårstad	1	3	13	27
(Canada) Jacob Dobson	0	4	18	33

Group C	W	L	PF	PA
(Scotland) James Craik	3	1	28	17
(United States) Team Dropkin	3	1	23	15
(Norway) Lukas Høstmælingen	2	2	18	21
(Scotland) Orrin Carson	1	3	16	25
(Switzerland) Andrin Schnider	1	3	16	23

Group D	W	L	PF	PA
(Scotland) Cameron Bryce	4	0	36	14
(Norway) Magnus Ramsfjell	2	2	22	19
(Netherlands) Wouter Gösgens	2	2	19	21
(Switzerland) Marco Hösli	2	2	19	21
(Scotland) Arran Thomson	0	4	7	28

=== Round robin results ===
All draw times are listed in British Summer Time (UTC+01:00).

==== Draw 1 ====
Thursday, 24 August, 8:30 am

Sheet A	1	2	3	4	5	6	7	8	Final
(Scotland) Ross Whyte	3	0	2	1	0	2	1	X	9
(Canada) Jacob Dobson	0	1	0	0	3	0	0	X	4

Sheet B	1	2	3	4	5	6	7	8	Final
(Netherlands) Wouter Gösgens	1	2	2	1	0	0	1	X	7
(Norway) Magnus Ramsfjell	0	0	0	0	1	1	0	X	2

Sheet C	1	2	3	4	5	6	7	8	Final
(Switzerland) Marco Hösli	0	1	0	1	0	0	X	X	2
(Scotland) Cameron Bryce	2	0	2	0	3	2	X	X	9

Sheet D	1	2	3	4	5	6	7	8	Final
(Switzerland) Michael Brunner	0	0	2	0	3	0	2	X	7
(Germany) Benny Kapp	0	1	0	1	0	2	0	X	4

==== Draw 2 ====
Thursday, 24 August, 12:30 pm

Sheet A	1	2	3	4	5	6	7	8	Final
(Scotland) James Craik	0	3	0	1	1	0	2	X	7
(Switzerland) Andrin Schnider	1	0	2	0	0	1	0	X	4

Sheet B	1	2	3	4	5	6	7	8	9	Final
(Scotland) Kyle Waddell	0	2	0	1	2	0	1	0	1	7
(Switzerland) Yves Stocker	0	0	3	0	0	2	0	1	0	6

Sheet C	1	2	3	4	5	6	7	8	Final
(Sweden) Fredrik Nyman	0	0	1	1	0	1	0	X	3
(Scotland) Bruce Mouat	1	2	0	0	2	0	3	X	8

Sheet D	1	2	3	4	5	6	7	8	Final
(Scotland) Orrin Carson	0	2	0	0	0	0	X	X	2
(United States) Team Dropkin	1	0	0	3	1	2	X	X	7

==== Draw 3 ====
Thursday, 24 August, 4:30 pm

Sheet A	1	2	3	4	5	6	7	8	Final
(Norway) Magnus Ramsfjell	2	0	0	2	1	1	1	X	7
(Scotland) Arran Thomson	0	0	1	0	0	0	0	X	1

Sheet B	1	2	3	4	5	6	7	8	Final
(Germany) Benny Kapp	0	2	0	4	0	0	1	0	7
(Scotland) Ross Whyte	2	0	2	0	2	0	0	2	8

Sheet C	1	2	3	4	5	6	7	8	Final
(Norway) Andreas Hårstad	0	0	1	0	1	0	X	X	2
(Switzerland) Michael Brunner	0	2	0	2	0	4	X	X	8

Sheet D	1	2	3	4	5	6	7	8	Final
(Scotland) Cameron Bryce	0	3	0	5	0	1	X	X	9
(Netherlands) Wouter Gösgens	1	0	2	0	1	0	X	X	4

==== Draw 4 ====
Thursday, 24 August, 8:30 pm

Sheet A	1	2	3	4	5	6	7	8	Final
(Switzerland) Yves Stocker	1	0	2	0	2	0	4	X	9
(Scotland) Ross Craik	0	1	0	1	0	1	0	X	3

Sheet B	1	2	3	4	5	6	7	8	Final
(United States) Team Dropkin	0	0	0	3	0	X	X	X	3
(Scotland) James Craik	1	2	1	0	5	X	X	X	9

Sheet C	1	2	3	4	5	6	7	8	Final
(Norway) Lukas Høstmælingen	1	0	4	0	0	1	1	X	7
(Scotland) Orrin Carson	0	1	0	0	3	0	0	X	4

Sheet D	1	2	3	4	5	6	7	8	Final
(Scotland) Bruce Mouat	0	6	1	3	X	X	X	X	10
(Scotland) Kyle Waddell	3	0	0	0	X	X	X	X	3

==== Draw 5 ====
Friday, 25 August, 8:30 am

Sheet A	1	2	3	4	5	6	7	8	Final
(Netherlands) Wouter Gösgens	1	0	0	0	2	0	0	0	3
(Switzerland) Marco Hösli	0	1	1	1	0	0	2	3	8

Sheet B	1	2	3	4	5	6	7	8	Final
(Scotland) Arran Thomson	0	0	0	1	0	0	X	X	1
(Scotland) Cameron Bryce	3	1	2	0	2	1	X	X	9

Sheet C	1	2	3	4	5	6	7	8	Final
(Canada) Jacob Dobson	0	2	1	0	1	0	2	1	7
(Germany) Benny Kapp	3	0	0	2	0	3	0	0	8

Sheet D	1	2	3	4	5	6	7	8	Final
(Scotland) Ross Whyte	2	2	2	0	2	0	X	X	8
(Norway) Andreas Hårstad	0	0	0	1	0	0	X	X	1

==== Draw 6 ====
Friday, 25 August, 12:30 pm

Sheet A	1	2	3	4	5	6	7	8	Final
(Scotland) Kyle Waddell	2	0	0	0	0	2	1	0	5
(Sweden) Fredrik Nyman	0	2	0	2	1	0	0	1	6

Sheet B	1	2	3	4	5	6	7	8	Final
(Scotland) Ross Craik	1	0	0	2	0	3	0	1	7
(Scotland) Bruce Mouat	0	2	1	0	1	0	1	0	5

Sheet C	1	2	3	4	5	6	7	8	Final
(Switzerland) Andrin Schnider	0	1	0	1	0	X	X	X	2
(United States) Team Dropkin	2	0	2	0	3	X	X	X	7

Sheet D	1	2	3	4	5	6	7	8	Final
(Scotland) James Craik	0	1	0	2	1	0	1	0	5
(Norway) Lukas Høstmælingen	1	0	1	0	0	4	0	1	7

==== Draw 7 ====
Friday, 25 August, 4:30 pm

Sheet A	1	2	3	4	5	6	7	8	Final
(Switzerland) Michael Brunner	3	0	1	0	0	1	0	X	5
(Scotland) Ross Whyte	0	3	0	0	2	0	2	X	7

Sheet B	1	2	3	4	5	6	7	8	Final
(Norway) Andreas Hårstad	4	0	2	1	0	0	1	X	8
(Canada) Jacob Dobson	0	1	0	0	2	1	0	X	4

Sheet C	1	2	3	4	5	6	7	8	Final
(Scotland) Cameron Bryce	3	0	2	0	1	0	0	3	9
(Norway) Magnus Ramsfjell	0	2	0	1	0	3	1	0	7

Sheet D	1	2	3	4	5	6	7	8	Final
(Switzerland) Marco Hösli	1	1	1	1	0	3	0	X	7
(Scotland) Arran Thomson	0	0	0	0	1	0	2	X	3

==== Draw 8 ====
Friday, 25 August, 8:30 pm

Sheet A	1	2	3	4	5	6	7	8	Final
(Scotland) Orrin Carson	0	1	0	2	0	X	X	X	3
(Scotland) James Craik	4	0	3	0	0	X	X	X	7

Sheet B	1	2	3	4	5	6	7	8	Final
(Norway) Lukas Høstmælingen	0	0	0	0	2	0	0	X	2
(Switzerland) Andrin Schnider	0	1	1	1	0	1	2	X	6

Sheet C	1	2	3	4	5	6	7	8	Final
(Scotland) Bruce Mouat	0	2	0	1	1	0	2	X	6
(Switzerland) Yves Stocker	1	0	2	0	0	1	0	X	4

Sheet D	1	2	3	4	5	6	7	8	Final
(Sweden) Fredrik Nyman	2	0	1	0	3	0	1	X	7
(Scotland) Ross Craik	0	1	0	1	0	2	0	X	4

==== Draw 9 ====
Saturday, 26 August, 8:30 am

Sheet A	1	2	3	4	5	6	7	8	Final
(Germany) Benny Kapp	0	1	0	5	1	0	X	X	7
(Norway) Andreas Hårstad	0	0	1	0	0	1	X	X	2

Sheet B	1	2	3	4	5	6	7	8	Final
(Norway) Magnus Ramsfjell	0	1	0	1	0	2	1	1	6
(Switzerland) Marco Hösli	0	0	1	0	1	0	0	0	2

Sheet C	1	2	3	4	5	6	7	8	Final
(Scotland) Arran Thomson	0	0	0	1	0	0	1	0	2
(Netherlands) Wouter Gösgens	1	0	1	0	1	1	0	1	5

Sheet D	1	2	3	4	5	6	7	8	Final
(Canada) Jacob Dobson	0	2	0	0	1	0	X	X	3
(Switzerland) Michael Brunner	2	0	1	2	0	3	X	X	8

==== Draw 10 ====
Saturday, 26 August, 12:30 pm

Sheet A	1	2	3	4	5	6	7	8	Final
(United States) Team Dropkin	0	0	1	3	0	0	2	X	6
(Norway) Lukas Høstmælingen	0	1	0	0	1	0	0	X	2

Sheet B	1	2	3	4	5	6	7	8	Final
(Switzerland) Yves Stocker	2	0	2	0	0	2	0	1	7
(Sweden) Fredrik Nyman	0	2	0	1	1	0	2	0	6

Sheet C	1	2	3	4	5	6	7	8	Final
(Scotland) Ross Craik	1	0	0	3	0	0	1	0	5
(Scotland) Kyle Waddell	0	0	2	0	1	1	0	2	6

Sheet D	1	2	3	4	5	6	7	8	Final
(Switzerland) Andrin Schnider	0	2	0	1	0	1	0	X	4
(Scotland) Orrin Carson	2	0	1	0	2	0	2	X	7

=== Playoffs ===
Quarterfinals
1	(Scotland) Ross Whyte	7
8	(Scotland) Kyle Waddell	5
4	(United States) Team Dropkin	9
5	(Switzerland) Michael Brunner	4
3	(Scotland) James Craik	5
6	(Scotland) Bruce Mouat	8
2	(Scotland) Cameron Bryce	7
7	(Norway) Lukas Høstmælingen	1

Semifinals
1	(Scotland) Ross Whyte	6
4	(United States) Team Dropkin	3
6	(Scotland) Bruce Mouat	6
2	(Scotland) Cameron Bryce	4

Final
1	(Scotland) Ross Whyte	5
6	(Scotland) Bruce Mouat	8

==== Quarterfinals ====
Saturday, 26 August, 5:00 pm

Sheet A	1	2	3	4	5	6	7	8	Final
(Scotland) James Craik	1	0	1	0	0	3	0	0	5
(Scotland) Bruce Mouat	0	1	0	1	1	0	3	2	8

Sheet B	1	2	3	4	5	6	7	8	Final
(Scotland) Ross Whyte	2	0	0	3	2	0	0	X	7
(Scotland) Kyle Waddell	0	2	0	0	0	2	1	X	5

Sheet C	1	2	3	4	5	6	7	8	Final
(Scotland) Cameron Bryce	3	1	0	2	1	X	X	X	7
(Norway) Lukas Høstmælingen	0	0	1	0	0	X	X	X	1

Sheet D	1	2	3	4	5	6	7	8	Final
(United States) Team Dropkin	2	0	2	1	0	2	2	X	9
(Switzerland) Michael Brunner	0	3	0	0	1	0	0	X	4

==== Semifinals ====
Sunday, 27 August, 8:30 am

Sheet A	1	2	3	4	5	6	7	8	Final
(Scotland) Ross Whyte	2	1	0	1	0	0	2	X	6
(United States) Team Dropkin	0	0	1	0	1	1	0	X	3

Sheet B	1	2	3	4	5	6	7	8	Final
(Scotland) Bruce Mouat	1	0	3	0	0	2	0	X	6
(Scotland) Cameron Bryce	0	1	0	1	1	0	1	X	4

==== Final ====
Sunday, 27 August, 12:30 pm

Team	1	2	3	4	5	6	7	8	Final
(Scotland) Ross Whyte	2	1	0	1	0	1	0	0	5
(Scotland) Bruce Mouat	0	0	3	0	1	0	2	2	8

== Women ==
=== Teams ===
The teams are listed as follows:

Skip	Third	Second	Lead	Alternate	Locale
Emira Abbes	Lena Kapp	Mia Höhne	Maike Beer		Füssen, Germany
Lucy Blair	Karlyn Lyon	Amy Mitchell	Susie Smith		Stirling, Scotland
Stefania Constantini	Marta Lo Deserto	Angela Romei	Giulia Zardini Lacedelli	Elena Mathis	Cortina d'Ampezzo, Italy
Fay Henderson	Hailey Duff	Amy MacDonald	Katie McMillan		Stirling, Scotland
Michèle Jäggi	Eve Muirhead (Note: Muirhead came out of retirement to spare for Team Jäggi who only had three players.)	Stefanie Berset	Lisa Muhmenthaler		Bern, Switzerland
Tia Laurie	Hannah Farries	Holly Burke	Kirsty Gallacher	Robyn Mitchell	Stirling, Scotland
Rebecca Morrison	Jennifer Dodds	Sophie Sinclair	Sophie Jackson	Gina Aitken	Stirling, Scotland
Robyn Munro	Lisa Davie	Holly Wilkie-Milne	Laura Watt		Stirling, Scotland
Kristin Skaslien (Fourth)	Marianne Rørvik (Skip)	Mille Haslev Nordbye	Martine Rønning		Lillehammer, Norway
Delaney Strouse	Anne O'Hara	Sydney Mullaney	Rebecca Rodgers	Susan Dudt	(United States) Traverse City, Michigan

=== Round robin standings ===
Final Round Robin Standings

Key
Teams to Playoffs

Group A	W	L	PF	PA
(United States) Delaney Strouse	3	1	32	18
(Norway) Marianne Rørvik	3	1	24	19
(Scotland) Rebecca Morrison	2	2	23	22
(Germany) Emira Abbes	2	2	25	26
(Scotland) Lucy Blair	0	4	12	31

Group B	W	L	PF	PA
(Italy) Stefania Constantini	4	0	24	15
(Scotland) Robyn Munro	2	2	17	16
(Switzerland) Michèle Jäggi	2	2	20	19
(Scotland) Fay Henderson	2	2	21	16
(Scotland) Tia Laurie	0	4	6	22

=== Round robin results ===
All draw times are listed in British Summer Time (UTC+01:00).

==== Draw 1 ====
Thursday, 17 August, 1:30 pm

Sheet B	1	2	3	4	5	6	7	8	Final
(Scotland) Lucy Blair	0	0	0	1	0	1	0	X	2
(United States) Delaney Strouse	1	1	2	0	3	0	2	X	9

Sheet C	1	2	3	4	5	6	7	8	Final
(Switzerland) Michèle Jäggi	0	0	2	1	1	1	0	X	5
(Scotland) Fay Henderson	0	1	0	0	0	0	2	X	3

Sheet D	1	2	3	4	5	6	7	8	Final
(Norway) Marianne Rørvik	0	2	0	3	0	0	1	3	9
(Germany) Emira Abbes	1	0	1	0	1	1	0	0	4

==== Draw 2 ====
Thursday, 17 August, 6:00 pm

Sheet B	1	2	3	4	5	6	7	8	Final
(Scotland) Robyn Munro	0	1	0	0	0	0	1	X	2
(Scotland) Fay Henderson	1	0	2	0	3	1	0	X	7

Sheet C	1	2	3	4	5	6	7	8	Final
(Italy) Stefania Constantini	0	0	3	1	0	1	0	X	5
(Scotland) Tia Laurie	0	0	0	0	1	0	1	X	2

Sheet D	1	2	3	4	5	6	7	8	Final
(Scotland) Lucy Blair	0	1	0	1	0	X	X	X	2
(Scotland) Rebecca Morrison	0	0	6	0	4	X	X	X	10

==== Draw 3 ====
Friday, 18 August, 9:00 am

Sheet B	1	2	3	4	5	6	7	8	Final
(Scotland) Rebecca Morrison	0	0	1	0	1	0	1	2	5
(Germany) Emira Abbes	0	1	0	1	0	1	0	0	3

Sheet C	1	2	3	4	5	6	7	8	Final
(United States) Delaney Strouse	0	0	1	1	1	0	2	X	5
(Norway) Marianne Rørvik	0	0	0	0	0	1	0	X	1

Sheet D	1	2	3	4	5	6	7	8	Final
(Switzerland) Michèle Jäggi	1	0	0	2	0	1	0	1	5
(Italy) Stefania Constantini	0	2	1	0	2	0	2	0	7

==== Draw 4 ====
Friday, 18 August, 1:30 pm

Sheet B	1	2	3	4	5	6	7	8	Final
(Norway) Marianne Rørvik	1	0	2	0	1	0	1	1	6
(Scotland) Lucy Blair	0	1	0	1	0	3	0	0	5

Sheet D	1	2	3	4	5	6	7	8	Final
(Scotland) Tia Laurie	0	0	0	0	0	1	0	0	1
(Scotland) Robyn Munro	0	0	1	0	1	0	0	1	3

==== Draw 5 ====
Friday, 18 August, 6:00 pm

Sheet B	1	2	3	4	5	6	7	8	Final
(Scotland) Tia Laurie	0	1	0	0	0	0	X	X	1
(Switzerland) Michèle Jäggi	2	0	2	1	1	1	X	X	7

Sheet C	1	2	3	4	5	6	7	8	Final
(Scotland) Fay Henderson	0	2	0	0	2	0	0	0	4
(Italy) Stefania Constantini	1	0	1	0	0	2	1	2	7

Sheet D	1	2	3	4	5	6	7	8	9	Final
(Germany) Emira Abbes	0	0	3	2	0	0	3	1	3	12
(United States) Delaney Strouse	3	3	0	0	1	2	0	0	0	9

==== Draw 6 ====
Saturday, 19 August, 9:00 am

Sheet B	1	2	3	4	5	6	7	8	Final
(Italy) Stefania Constantini	1	0	0	0	2	1	0	1	5
(Scotland) Robyn Munro	0	2	0	1	0	0	1	0	4

Sheet C	1	2	3	4	5	6	7	8	Final
(Germany) Emira Abbes	0	0	0	0	3	3	0	X	6
(Scotland) Lucy Blair	0	0	0	2	0	0	1	X	3

Sheet D	1	2	3	4	5	6	7	8	Final
(Scotland) Rebecca Morrison	0	1	0	2	2	0	0	0	5
(Norway) Marianne Rørvik	3	0	1	0	0	2	1	1	8

==== Draw 7 ====
Saturday, 19 August, 1:30 pm

Sheet B	1	2	3	4	5	6	7	8	Final
(United States) Delaney Strouse	0	3	1	0	5	X	X	X	9
(Scotland) Rebecca Morrison	1	0	0	2	0	X	X	X	3

Sheet C	1	2	3	4	5	6	7	8	Final
(Scotland) Robyn Munro	4	0	0	1	1	0	2	X	8
(Switzerland) Michèle Jäggi	0	1	1	0	0	1	0	X	3

Sheet D	1	2	3	4	5	6	7	8	Final
(Scotland) Fay Henderson	0	3	1	0	3	X	X	X	7
(Scotland) Tia Laurie	1	0	0	1	0	X	X	X	2

=== Playoffs ===
Quarterfinals
B2	(Scotland) Robyn Munro	7
A3	(Scotland) Rebecca Morrison	1
A2	(Norway) Marianne Rørvik	7
B3	(Switzerland) Michèle Jäggi	6

Semifinals
A1	(United States) Delaney Strouse	6
B2	(Scotland) Robyn Munro	3
B1	(Italy) Stefania Constantini	5
A2	(Norway) Marianne Rørvik	3

Final
A1	(United States) Delaney Strouse	6
B1	(Italy) Stefania Constantini	5

==== Quarterfinals ====
Saturday, 19 August, 6:00 pm

Sheet B	1	2	3	4	5	6	7	8	Final
(Norway) Marianne Rørvik	1	0	1	0	2	0	2	1	7
(Switzerland) Michèle Jäggi	0	2	0	2	0	2	0	0	6

Sheet D	1	2	3	4	5	6	7	8	Final
(Scotland) Robyn Munro	0	3	0	1	1	2	X	X	7
(Scotland) Rebecca Morrison	0	0	1	0	0	0	X	X	1

==== Semifinals ====
Sunday, 20 August, 8:30 am

Sheet B	1	2	3	4	5	6	7	8	Final
(United States) Delaney Strouse	0	2	1	2	1	0	0	X	6
(Scotland) Robyn Munro	0	0	0	0	0	2	1	X	3

Sheet D	1	2	3	4	5	6	7	8	Final
(Italy) Stefania Constantini	0	0	2	0	1	1	0	1	5
(Norway) Marianne Rørvik	0	1	0	1	0	0	1	0	3

==== Final ====
Sunday, 20 August, 12:30 pm

Sheet C	1	2	3	4	5	6	7	8	Final
(United States) Delaney Strouse	0	0	1	0	1	0	3	1	6
(Italy) Stefania Constantini	0	3	0	1	0	1	0	0	5
