= 2023 United States Women's Curling Championship =

- Host city: Denver, Colorado
- Arena: Denver Coliseum
- Dates: February 6–11
- Winner: (Minnesota) Team Peterson
- Curling club: St. Paul CC, St. Paul
- Skip: Tabitha Peterson
- Third: Cory Thiesse
- Second: Becca Hamilton
- Lead: Tara Peterson
- Coach: Cathy Overton-Clapham
- Finalist: (Michigan) Delaney Strouse

The 2023 United States Women's Curling Championship was held from February 6 to 11 at the Denver Coliseum in Denver, Colorado. The event was held in conjunction with the 2023 United States Men's Curling Championship. This was the first Women's Championship in two years, after the 2022 Championship was cancelled due to the COVID-19 pandemic.

== Qualification process ==
Teams qualified for the event according to the following procedure:

Qualification method	Berths	Qualifying teams
2022 Olympic representative	1	Tabitha Peterson
2023 World Junior Curling Championships representative	1	Miranda Scheel
Qualifying Event #1 (Curling Stadium Contender Series)	1	Madison Bear
Qualifying Event #2 (Curl Mesabi Classic)	1	Sarah Anderson
World Curling Federation YTD ranking system as of December 20, 2022	4	Delaney Strouse; Christine McMakin; Kim Rhyme; Rachel Workin

== Teams ==
Eight teams participated in the 2023 national championship:

Skip	Third	Second	Lead	Alternate	Locale
Sarah Anderson	Taylor Anderson	Lexi Lanigan	Aileen Geving	Leah Yavarow	Chaska, Minnesota
Madison Bear	Annmarie Dubberstein	Elizabeth Cousins	Allison Howell	Liz Janiak	Chaska, Minnesota
Christine McMakin	Cora Farrell	Jenna Burchesky	Clare Moores		Fargo, North Dakota
Tabitha Peterson	Cory Thiesse	Becca Hamilton	Tara Peterson		Chaska, Minnesota
Kim Rhyme	Libby Brundage	Cait Flannery	Katie Rhyme		St. Paul, Minnesota
Miranda Scheel	Jordan Hein	Tessa Thurlow	Amelia Hintz		Eau Claire, Wisconsin
Delaney Strouse	Anne O'Hara	Sydney Mullaney	Rebecca Rodgers	Susan Dudt	Minneapolis, Minnesota
Rachel Workin	Anya Normandeau	Ann Podoll	Christina Lammers		Fargo, North Dakota

== Round robin standings ==
Final Round Robin Standings

Key
Teams to Playoffs

Skip	W	L
(Minnesota) Tabitha Peterson	7	0
(Minnesota) Delaney Strouse	6	1
(Minnesota) Sarah Anderson	5	2
(Minnesota) Madison Bear	4	3
(Minnesota) Kim Rhyme	2	5
(North Dakota) Christine McMakin	2	5
(Wisconsin) Miranda Scheel	1	6
(North Dakota) Rachel Workin	1	6

== Round robin results ==
All draw times are listed in Mountain Time (UTC−07:00).

=== Draw 1 ===
Monday, February 6, 9:00 am

Sheet A	1	2	3	4	5	6	7	8	9	10	Final
(North Dakota) Rachel Workin	0	0	0	1	0	0	1	1	2	0	5
(Minnesota) Sarah Anderson	0	2	1	0	1	1	0	0	0	1	6

Sheet B	1	2	3	4	5	6	7	8	9	10	Final
(Minnesota) Kim Rhyme	1	1	0	2	0	0	1	1	0	1	7
(North Dakota) Christine McMakin	0	0	1	0	1	3	0	0	1	0	6

Sheet C	1	2	3	4	5	6	7	8	9	10	11	Final
(Minnesota) Tabitha Peterson	0	1	0	2	1	0	2	0	0	2	1	9
(Minnesota) Madison Bear	1	0	3	0	0	2	0	1	1	0	0	8

Sheet D	1	2	3	4	5	6	7	8	9	10	Final
(Minnesota) Delaney Strouse	0	1	0	3	1	1	0	0	1	X	7
(Wisconsin) Miranda Scheel	1	0	1	0	0	0	1	1	0	X	4

=== Draw 2 ===
Monday, February 6, 7:00 pm

Sheet A	1	2	3	4	5	6	7	8	9	10	Final
(Minnesota) Madison Bear	0	3	0	0	2	0	1	0	1	X	7
(North Dakota) Christine McMakin	2	0	0	1	0	0	0	1	0	X	4

Sheet B	1	2	3	4	5	6	7	8	9	10	Final
(Minnesota) Sarah Anderson	0	0	0	1	1	0	2	0	0	3	7
(Wisconsin) Miranda Scheel	0	0	0	0	0	1	0	1	1	0	3

Sheet C	1	2	3	4	5	6	7	8	9	10	Final
(North Dakota) Rachel Workin	0	0	1	1	0	0	1	0	1	X	4
(Minnesota) Delaney Strouse	0	3	0	0	1	0	0	2	0	X	6

Sheet D	1	2	3	4	5	6	7	8	9	10	Final
(Minnesota) Kim Rhyme	0	1	0	0	0	0	2	0	X	X	3
(Minnesota) Tabitha Peterson	2	0	1	1	0	1	0	4	X	X	9

=== Draw 3 ===
Tuesday, February 7, 12:00 pm

Sheet A	1	2	3	4	5	6	7	8	9	10	Final
(Minnesota) Tabitha Peterson	2	0	2	2	0	3	0	1	0	X	10
(North Dakota) Rachel Workin	0	1	0	0	4	0	1	0	1	X	7

Sheet B	1	2	3	4	5	6	7	8	9	10	Final
(North Dakota) Christine McMakin	2	0	2	0	0	0	1	0	1	0	6
(Minnesota) Delaney Strouse	0	2	0	3	0	1	0	1	0	1	8

Sheet C	1	2	3	4	5	6	7	8	9	10	Final
(Minnesota) Kim Rhyme	0	2	1	3	0	0	3	0	4	X	13
(Wisconsin) Miranda Scheel	1	0	0	0	1	2	0	2	0	X	6

Sheet D	1	2	3	4	5	6	7	8	9	10	Final
(Minnesota) Sarah Anderson	1	0	0	0	1	1	0	2	1	X	6
(Minnesota) Madison Bear	0	0	0	1	0	0	1	0	0	X	2

=== Draw 4 ===
Tuesday, February 7, 8:00 pm

Sheet A	1	2	3	4	5	6	7	8	9	10	Final
(Minnesota) Kim Rhyme	0	0	0	1	0	2	0	3	1	0	7
(Minnesota) Delaney Strouse	0	1	0	0	1	0	4	0	0	2	8

Sheet B	1	2	3	4	5	6	7	8	9	10	Final
(Minnesota) Tabitha Peterson	0	0	3	0	2	2	1	X	X	X	8
(Minnesota) Sarah Anderson	0	2	0	1	0	0	0	X	X	X	3

Sheet C	1	2	3	4	5	6	7	8	9	10	Final
(Minnesota) Madison Bear	2	0	2	1	0	1	1	0	1	X	8
(North Dakota) Rachel Workin	0	2	0	0	2	0	0	1	0	X	5

Sheet D	1	2	3	4	5	6	7	8	9	10	Final
(Wisconsin) Miranda Scheel	1	0	0	1	0	2	0	1	0	X	5
(North Dakota) Christine McMakin	0	1	2	0	1	0	4	0	1	X	9

=== Draw 5 ===
Wednesday, February 8, 2:00 pm

Sheet A	1	2	3	4	5	6	7	8	9	10	Final
(Wisconsin) Miranda Scheel	0	1	0	0	0	0	0	X	X	X	1
(Minnesota) Madison Bear	1	0	3	0	2	1	1	X	X	X	8

Sheet B	1	2	3	4	5	6	7	8	9	10	11	Final
(North Dakota) Rachel Workin	0	1	1	1	0	0	0	2	0	2	1	8
(Minnesota) Kim Rhyme	2	0	0	0	2	1	1	0	1	0	0	7

Sheet C	1	2	3	4	5	6	7	8	9	10	Final
(Minnesota) Sarah Anderson	2	0	3	0	0	3	1	2	X	X	11
(North Dakota) Christine McMakin	0	1	0	1	1	0	0	0	X	X	3

Sheet D	1	2	3	4	5	6	7	8	9	10	Final
(Minnesota) Tabitha Peterson	0	4	1	0	2	0	1	0	1	X	9
(Minnesota) Delaney Strouse	1	0	0	2	0	1	0	1	0	X	5

=== Draw 6 ===
Thursday, February 9, 9:00 am

Sheet A	1	2	3	4	5	6	7	8	9	10	Final
(Minnesota) Sarah Anderson	0	0	0	1	2	0	2	0	4	X	9
(Minnesota) Kim Rhyme	0	1	1	0	0	2	0	1	0	X	5

Sheet B	1	2	3	4	5	6	7	8	9	10	Final
(Minnesota) Delaney Strouse	1	1	0	0	1	1	0	1	1	1	7
(Minnesota) Madison Bear	0	0	2	1	0	0	1	0	0	0	4

Sheet C	1	2	3	4	5	6	7	8	9	10	Final
(Wisconsin) Miranda Scheel	0	1	0	0	1	1	0	2	0	0	5
(Minnesota) Tabitha Peterson	2	0	0	2	0	0	2	0	1	2	9

Sheet D	1	2	3	4	5	6	7	8	9	10	Final
(North Dakota) Christine McMakin	0	2	1	0	1	1	0	3	0	3	11
(North Dakota) Rachel Workin	1	0	0	1	0	0	2	0	5	0	9

=== Draw 7 ===
Thursday, February 9, 6:00 pm

Sheet A	1	2	3	4	5	6	7	8	9	10	Final
(North Dakota) Christine McMakin	0	0	1	0	0	1	0	3	0	X	5
(Minnesota) Tabitha Peterson	0	2	0	3	1	0	2	0	2	X	10

Sheet B	1	2	3	4	5	6	7	8	9	10	Final
(Wisconsin) Miranda Scheel	0	0	2	0	0	0	2	1	1	X	6
(North Dakota) Rachel Workin	0	0	0	1	1	0	0	0	0	X	2

Sheet C	1	2	3	4	5	6	7	8	9	10	Final
(Minnesota) Delaney Strouse	0	0	1	1	0	0	2	0	0	1	5
(Minnesota) Sarah Anderson	0	1	0	0	0	1	0	1	1	0	4

Sheet D	1	2	3	4	5	6	7	8	9	10	11	Final
(Minnesota) Madison Bear	0	1	1	0	2	0	0	0	2	2	1	9
(Minnesota) Kim Rhyme	2	0	0	2	0	1	2	1	0	0	0	8

== Playoffs ==
Page playoff system
1	(Minnesota) Tabitha Peterson	11
2	(Minnesota) Delaney Strouse	10
3	(Minnesota) Sarah Anderson	8
4	(Minnesota) Madison Bear	6

Semifinal
2	(Minnesota) Delaney Strouse	9
3	(Minnesota) Sarah Anderson	4

Final
1	(Minnesota) Tabitha Peterson	8
2	(Minnesota) Delaney Strouse	5

=== 1 vs. 2 ===
Friday, February 10, 2:00 pm

Sheet B	1	2	3	4	5	6	7	8	9	10	Final
(Minnesota) Tabitha Peterson	2	1	0	2	0	1	0	1	0	4	11
(Minnesota) Delaney Strouse	0	0	3	0	3	0	2	0	2	0	10

=== 3 vs. 4 ===
Friday, February 10, 2:00 pm

Sheet D	1	2	3	4	5	6	7	8	9	10	Final
(Minnesota) Sarah Anderson	0	0	0	2	0	3	2	0	0	1	8
(Minnesota) Madison Bear	0	1	0	0	2	0	0	2	1	0	6

=== Semifinal ===
Friday, February 10, 7:00 pm

Sheet B	1	2	3	4	5	6	7	8	9	10	Final
(Minnesota) Delaney Strouse	1	2	0	3	0	2	0	1	X	X	9
(Minnesota) Sarah Anderson	0	0	1	0	1	0	2	0	X	X	4

=== Final ===
Saturday, February 11, 4:00 pm

Sheet B	1	2	3	4	5	6	7	8	9	10	Final
(Minnesota) Tabitha Peterson	3	0	0	1	0	0	1	0	3	X	8
(Minnesota) Delaney Strouse	0	0	2	0	1	1	0	1	0	X	5

2023 United States Women's Curling Championship

Tabitha Peterson
3rd United States Championship title
