= Kate Cameron (curler) =

Canadian curler (born 1991)

- Curler
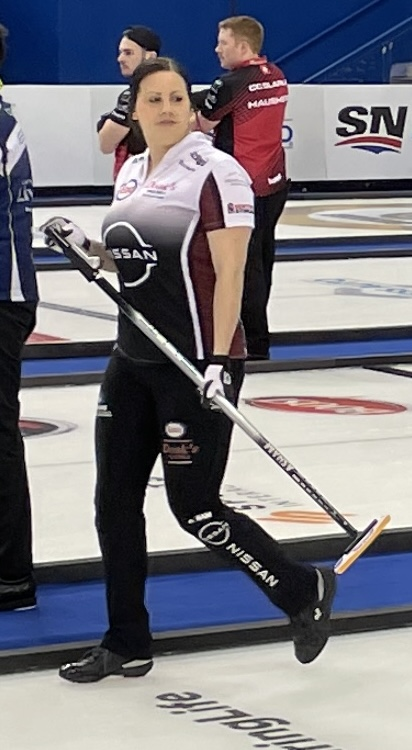
- Cameron at the 2022 Players' Championship
- Other names: Kate Hogan
- Born: Katherine Cameron; October 22, 1991 (age 35); Winnipeg, Manitoba

Team
- Curling club: Granite CC, Winnipeg, MB
- Skip: Kate Cameron
- Third: Laurie St-Georges
- Second: Emily Riley
- Lead: Émilia Gagné

Curling career
- Member Association: Manitoba (2008–2019; 2023–2026); Alberta (2019–2023); Quebec (2026–present)
- Hearts: 8 (2017, 2018, 2020, 2021, 2022, 2023, 2024, 2025)
- Top CTRS ranking: 5th (2021–22)
Medal record
Women's curling
Representing Manitoba
Scotties Tournament of Hearts
| Silver medal – second place | 2017 St. Catharines |
| Bronze medal – third place | 2024 Calgary |
Representing Alberta
Scotties Tournament of Hearts
| Bronze medal – third place | 2021 Calgary |

Katherine Cameron (born October 22, 1991) is a Canadian curler from Grande Pointe, Manitoba. She currently skips her own team out of Quebec.

== Career ==
In 2008 Cameron skipped a team to win the U16 Provincial Championship. The team included Nicole Sigvaldason, Sheyna Andries and Emily Helston.

In 2010 Cameron lost the junior provincial final to Breanne Meakin. Cameron's team included Nicole Sigvaldason, Sheyna Andries and Kelsey Hinds. In 2012 again Cameron lost the junior provincial final to Shannon Birchard. Cameron threw last stones for Team Vandepoele, the team included skip, Alyssa Vandepoele, Abby Ackland and Sheyna Andries.

After juniors, Cameron graduated to a women's curling career. She won her first World Curling Tour event as a skip at the 2012 Atkins Curling Supplies Women's Classic. She skipped her team of Erika Sigurdson, Brandi Oliver and Lindsay Baldock at the 2013 Manitoba Scotties Tournament of Hearts where they finished with a 5–2 record.

In 2014 Cameron skipped her team, Erika Sigurdson, Sheyna Andries and Lindsay Baldock at the 2014 Manitoba Scotties Tournament of Hearts where they finished with a 2–5 record.

Cameron found herself joining curler Kristy McDonald. The team of Kristy McDonald, Kate Cameron, Leslie Wilson and Raunora Westcott immediately found success in winning their first WCT event, the Mother Club Fall Curling Classic. They went on to the 2015 Manitoba Scotties Tournament of Hearts, where they finished 5-2 losing the 2 vs. 2 game to Barb Spencer. The team did even better at the 2016 Manitoba Scotties Tournament of Hearts, finishing the round robin with a 6–1 record, and then made it to the final where they lost to Kerri Einarson.

McDonald retired from curling in 2016, so the rink had Saskatchewan resident Michelle Englot join the team as skip. The team played in the 2017 Manitoba Scotties Tournament of Hearts, going 5–2 after the round robin. The team then tore through the playoffs, defeating Olympic champion Jennifer Jones in the 1 vs. 2 game, and then beat Darcy Robertson in the final. The team represented Manitoba at the 2017 Scotties Tournament of Hearts, where they continued their success. They finished the round robin in first place with a 10–1 record. They then defeated Ontario's Rachel Homan in the 1 vs. 2 page playoff game, sending them to the final, where they again met Ontario in a re-match. They would not be as successful in the final, and the team had to settle for silver.

Their successful season qualified the team for the 2017 Canadian Olympic Curling Trials, but they would have less success there, finishing with a 2–6 record. However, as the Rachel Homan team won the event, and would go on to represent Canada at the Olympics, the Englot rink would be invited to play as Team Canada at the 2018 Scotties Tournament of Hearts, a spot normally reserved for the defending champions. There, the team finished with a 6–5 record, in sixth place, missing the playoffs. Also that season, the team would play in the 2018 Continental Cup of Curling.

In March 2018, Cameron announced she was joining a Winnipeg-based team skipped by Allison Flaxey, with second Taylor McDonald and lead Raunora Westcott. The team participated in two Slams and finished sixth at the 2019 Manitoba Scotties Tournament of Hearts.

On March 15, 2019, it was announced that Cameron would join the new team of Laura Walker, Taylor McDonald and Nadine Scotland for the 2019–20 curling season. They did not qualify for the playoffs in their first two events, the 2019 Cargill Curling Training Centre Icebreaker and the Booster Juice Shoot-Out before winning the 2019 Mother Club Fall Curling Classic after posting a perfect 7–0 record. Cameron won her second provincial title when the team defeated Kelsey Rocque 7–4 in the 2020 Alberta Scotties Tournament of Hearts final. Representing Alberta at the 2020 Scotties Tournament of Hearts, the team finished pool play with a 3–4 record, failing to qualify for the championship round. It would be the team's last event of the season as both the Players' Championship and the Champions Cup Grand Slam events were cancelled due to the COVID-19 pandemic.

Due to the pandemic, the 2021 Alberta Scotties were cancelled, so Curling Alberta appointed the Walker rink to represent the province at the 2021 Scotties Tournament of Hearts. Team Walker's regular lead Nadine Scotland, who was three-months pregnant, opted not to play in the tournament, which was being held in a "bubble" due to the pandemic. She was replaced by Rachel Brown. At the Scotties, the team finished with a 9–3 round robin record, tied for third with Manitoba, skipped by Jennifer Jones. Alberta beat Manitoba in the tiebreaker, but lost in the semifinal against the defending champion Team Canada rink, skipped by Kerri Einarson, settling for a bronze medal.

In just their second event of the 2021–22 season, Team Walker reached the final of the 2021 Alberta Curling Series: Saville Shoot-Out where they were defeated by Kim Eun-jung. Due to the pandemic, the qualification process for the 2021 Canadian Olympic Curling Trials had to be modified to qualify enough teams for the championship. In these modifications, Curling Canada created the 2021 Canadian Curling Trials Direct-Entry Event, an event where five teams would compete to try to earn one of three spots into the 2021 Canadian Olympic Curling Trials. Team Walker qualified for the Trials Direct-Entry Event due to their CTRS ranking from the 2019–20 season. At the event, the team went 2–2 through the round robin, qualifying for the tiebreaker round where they faced British Columbia's Corryn Brown. After being defeated by Brown in the first game, Team Walker won the second tiebreaker to secure their spot at the Olympic Trials. The team had one more event before the Trials, the 2021 National Grand Slam, where they lost in the quarterfinals to Tracy Fleury. A few weeks later, they competed in the Olympic Trials, held November 20 to 28 in Saskatoon, Saskatchewan. At the event, the team had mixed results, ultimately finishing in sixth place with a 3–5 record.

A few weeks before the Alberta provincial championship, Team Walker won the Alberta Curling Series: Avonair tour event, defeating Casey Scheidegger in the final. They then competed in the 2022 Alberta Scotties Tournament of Hearts, where they posted a 6–1 record through the round robin. This created a three-way tie between Walker, Scheidegger and the Kelsey Rocque rink, however, as Walker had to best draw shot challenge between the three rinks, they advanced directly to the final. There, they met the Scheidegger rink, who defeated Rocque in the semifinal. After a tight final, Walker secured the victory for her team with a draw to the eight-foot to win 6–5. This qualified the team for their second straight national championship. At the 2022 Scotties Tournament of Hearts, the team could not replicate their success from 2021, finishing the round robin with a 3–5 record and missing the playoffs. Team Walker wrapped up their season at the 2022 Players' Championship where they missed the playoffs.

On March 17, 2022, the team announced that they would be disbanding at the end of the 2021–22 season. It was later announced that Cameron and teammate Taylor McDonald would be joining Casey Scheidegger and Jessie Haughian for the 2022–23 season. Scheidegger would skip the team, with Cameron playing third, Haughian at second and McDonald at lead. The team found immediate success, reaching back-to-back semifinals at the 2022 Saville Shoot-Out and the 2022 Alberta Curling Series Major. The team then played in the 2022 PointsBet Invitational single elimination tournament, however, without Scheidegger who was on maternity leave. She was replaced by Kristie Moore. The team had tight games in all three of their victories over Kerry Galusha, Rachel Homan and Kaitlyn Lawes to qualify for the final. There, they lost 7–4 to Jennifer Jones. After a semifinal finish at the 2022 Curlers Corner Autumn Gold Curling Classic, Team Scheidegger lost back-to-back finals at the Ladies Alberta Open and the Red Deer Curling Classic to Kayla Skrlik and Rachel Homan respectively. At the 2023 Alberta Scotties Tournament of Hearts, the team finished second through the round robin with a 6–1 record. They then beat Selena Sturmay in the semifinal to qualify for the provincial final where they faced the undefeated Skrlik rink. The game went back and forth, with Skrlik making a highlight reel double takeout in the tenth end to score two and win the game 9–8. Despite this, Team Scheidegger still qualified for the 2023 Scotties Tournament of Hearts as Wild Card #2 thanks to their CTRS points earned throughout the season. At the Hearts, the team finished sixth in their pool with a 3–5 record, earning wins over the Wild Card #3, Newfoundland and Labrador and the Northwest Territories. In Grand Slam play, Team Scheidegger competed in four events, however, failed to reach the playoffs at all four. Their best finish came at the 2022 Masters where they lost in a tiebreaker to Chelsea Carey. Cameron skipped the team at the event. The team disbanded following the season.

For the 2023–24 season, Cameron returned to Manitoba to skip her own team for the first time since 2014. She and longtime teammate Taylor McDonald joined forces with Meghan Walter and Mackenzie Elias to make the new foursome. The team had immediate success in their first event together, going undefeated to claim the 2023 Icebreaker Challenge. They continued to build momentum throughout their next few events, reaching the final of the Alberta Curling Series Major and the semifinals of the 2023 Saville Shootout and the Mother Club Fall Curling Classic. In Grand Slam play, the team played in four events but failed to reach the playoffs in any of them. At the 2024 Manitoba Scotties Tournament of Hearts, Team Cameron had a strong start with six straight wins to begin the event. They then lost their final two championship round games and the semifinal to Beth Peterson, eliminating them in third. However, their strong results throughout the season earned them an entry into the 2024 Scotties Tournament of Hearts in Calgary. For the Hearts, Kelsey Rocque took McDonald's place in the lineup as she was expecting her first child. Throughout the preliminary round, Team Cameron had mixed results but managed to win both their games on the final day of round robin to earn a championship round berth. There, they knocked off the four-time defending champions Team Kerri Einarson to earn a spot in the final four. After defeating Alberta's Selena Sturmay in the 3 vs. 4 game, they came up short against Jennifer Jones in the semifinal, earning the bronze medal. At the end of the season, the team announced third Meghan Walter was stepping away from competitive curling to focus on school.

== Personal life ==
Cameron works as a paralegal at Cochrane Sinclair. She is engaged to Tyler Owens.

== Grand Slam record ==
Key
| C | Champion |
| F | Lost in Final |
| SF | Lost in Semifinal |
| QF | Lost in Quarterfinals |
| R16 | Lost in the round of 16 |
| Q | Did not advance to playoffs |
| T2 | Played in Tier 2 event |
| DNP | Did not participate in event |
| N/A | Not a Grand Slam event that season |

| Event | 2014–15 | 2015–16 | 2016–17 | 2017–18 | 2018–19 | 2019–20 | 2020–21 | 2021–22 | 2022–23 | 2023–24 | 2024–25 | 2025–26 |
|---|---|---|---|---|---|---|---|---|---|---|---|---|
| Masters | Q | SF | DNP | Q | DNP | DNP | N/A | DNP | Q | Q | DNP | T2 |
| Tour Challenge | N/A | QF | F | QF | Q | T2 | N/A | N/A | Q | Q | T2 | DNP |
| The National | N/A | QF | DNP | Q | DNP | DNP | N/A | QF | DNP | Q | DNP | DNP |
| Canadian Open | Q | Q | Q | F | DNP | Q | N/A | N/A | Q | DNP | DNP | T2 |
| Players' | Q | DNP | Q | DNP | DNP | N/A | DNP | Q | Q | DNP | DNP | DNP |
| Champions Cup | N/A | DNP | DNP | DNP | QF | N/A | DNP | DNP | DNP | N/A | N/A | N/A |

=== Former events ===
| Event | 2013–14 | 2014–15 |
|---|---|---|
| Colonial Square | Q | QF |

== Teams ==
| Season | Skip | Third | Second | Lead |
|---|---|---|---|---|
| 2008–09 | Kate Cameron | Nicole Sigvaldason | Sheyna Andries | Emily Helston |
| 2009–10 | Kate Cameron | Nicole Sigvaldason | Sheyna Andries | Kelsey Hinds |
| 2011–12 | Kate Cameron (Fourth) | Alyssa Vandepoele (Skip) | Abby Ackland | Sheyna Andries |
| 2012–13 | Kate Cameron | Erika Sigurdson | Brandi Oliver | Lindsay Baldock |
| 2013–14 | Kate Cameron | Erika Sigurdson | Sheyna Andries | Lindsay Baldock |
| 2014–15 | Kristy McDonald | Kate Cameron | Leslie Wilson | Raunora Westcott |
| 2015–16 | Kristy McDonald | Kate Cameron | Leslie Wilson-Westcott | Raunora Westcott |
| 2016–17 | Michelle Englot | Kate Cameron | Leslie Wilson-Westcott | Raunora Westcott |
| 2017–18 | Michelle Englot | Kate Cameron | Leslie Wilson-Westcott | Raunora Westcott |
| 2018–19 | Allison Flaxey | Kate Cameron | Taylor McDonald | Raunora Westcott |
| 2019–20 | Laura Walker | Kate Cameron | Taylor McDonald | Nadine Scotland |
| 2020–21 | Laura Walker | Kate Cameron | Taylor McDonald | Nadine Scotland; Rachel Brown (Note: Scotland was replaced by Rachel Brown for the 2021 Scotties Tournament of Hearts. Due to the COVID-19 pandemic, Scotland only played one game for the team that season) |
| 2021–22 | Laura Walker | Kate Cameron | Taylor McDonald | Nadine Scotland |
| 2022–23 | Casey Scheidegger | Kate Cameron | Jessie Haughian | Taylor McDonald |
| 2023–24 | Kate Cameron | Meghan Walter | Taylor McDonald | Mackenzie Elias |
| 2024–25 | Kate Cameron | Taylor McDonald | Brianna Cullen | Mackenzie Elias |
| 2025–26 | Kate Cameron | Briane Harris | Taylor McDonald | Mackenzie Elias |
| 2026–27 | Kate Cameron | Laurie St-Georges | Emily Riley | Émilia Gagné |
