= Elizabeth Cousins =

American curler (born 1999)

- Curler
- Born: June 21, 1999 (age 27); Medfield, Massachusetts, U.S.

Team
- Curling club: Nashua Country Club, Nashua, NH
- Skip: Elizabeth Cousins
- Third: Annmarie Dubberstein
- Second: Allison Howell
- Lead: Elizabeth Janiak
Medal record
Women's curling
U.S. Olympic Trials
Bronze medal – third place	2021 Omaha
Silver medal – second place	2025 Sioux Falls
United States Women's Curling Championship
Bronze medal – third place	2020 Spokane
Silver medal – second place	2021 Wausau
Silver medal – second place	2025 Duluth
Silver medal – second place	2026 Charlotte

Elizabeth Cousins (born June 21, 1999) is an American curler from Nashua, New Hampshire. She is a three-time national runner-up in women's curling. She currently is skip of her own team.

== Career ==
=== Juniors ===
Elizabeth Cousins first competed at the United States Junior Curling Championship in 2015. They finished round robin with a 2-7 record. In 2016 she competed again and improved to a 4-5 record. In 2017 she competed again and finished 2-5.

In 2017 USA Curling began a U18 National Championship to further promote youth curling. Cousins qualified for the inaugural event. She went undefeated 5-0 in round robin and qualified for the playoffs. She won the semi-final and lost in the final to Cait Flannery.

Cousins did not qualify for the 2018 United States Junior Curling Championship but returned in 2019 where she went 3-4 in round robin and finished 4th place just barely missing playoffs. 2020 was Cousin's last year of eligibility. Long time lead Sydney Mullaney left the team to join Delaney Strouse's junior rink. Elizabeth Cousins teamed up with Ariel Traxler. Ariel was team skip but threw lead stones and Elizabeth Cousins threw skip stones. 2020 was her final Junior Curling Championship, she finished round robin with a 3-4 record missing playoffs.

=== Women's ===
Team Traxler played in the 2020 United States Women's Challenge Round and finished in 2nd place which qualified them for the 2020 United States Women's Curling Championship. They went 4-3 and made playoffs. They lost to eventual runner up Jamie Sinclair in the semifinals and finished 3rd place. Their season was cut short due to the COVID-19 pandemic.

Having aged out of Juniors, Elizabeth Cousins left Team Traxler who returned to focus on Junior Curling. In March 2020 Jamie Sinclair's team that beat Elizabeth in the semifinals disbanded. Later in the off-season it was announced that Sinclair had formed a new team, bringing Monica Walker out of her short retirement to play at third, and adding two young curlers for the front end, Cora Farrell and Elizabeth Cousins. The team was not able to compete in any tour events due to the pandemic, but they were able to play in the 2021 United States Women's Curling Championship, held May 26–30 in Wausau, Wisconsin. There, they topped the round robin with an undefeated 6–0 record, which qualified them directly to the championship final where they faced Team Cory Christensen, Sinclair's former teammates. After trailing early, Team Sinclair tied the game in the eighth end, but couldn't hold on for the win as Christensen scored two points in the extra end to win 8–6.

The following season, Team Sinclair began by winning the 2021 Oakville Fall Classic, defeating Suzanne Birt 8–6 in the final game. Later in the season, they won another tour event at the Atkins Curling Supplies Classic with a 10–4 win over Kristy Watling in the championship final. They reached the final of the US Open of Curling, losing to the Tabitha Peterson rink 8–5 in the final. They also had a semifinal finish at the 2021 Curlers Corner Autumn Gold Curling Classic and a quarterfinal finish at the 2021 Oakville Labour Day Classic. Team Sinclair then played in the 2021 United States Olympic Curling Trials, held November 12 to 21 at the Baxter Arena in Omaha, Nebraska. Despite entering the Trials as the second ranked team, the team did not have a good performance, failing to reach the playoff round with a 4–6 record, finishing third. Team Sinclair ended the 2021–22 season with a semifinal loss at the Curl Mesabi Classic. They disbanded following the season.

For the 2022-23 season, Elizabeth joined Madison Bear's Women's U-25 national team replacing Taylor Brees as Second. They won the 2022 Curling Stadium Contender Series qualifying them for the 2023 United States Women's Curling Championship. They finished 4th at Nationals that year. That off-season, Madison Bear left the team to focus on mixed doubles with Aiden Oldenberg. The team shook up positions, with Elizabeth moving to Skip and Allison Howell moving to Second. Elizabeth Cousins reunited with former junior teammate Elizabeth Janiak who joined the team as lead after previously serving as an Alternate.

To begin the 2023-24 campaign, Elizabeth Cousins qualified for playoffs in the 2023 US Open of Curling. Her team lost the semifinal match to a team skipped by Sarah Anderson. Later that season, Elizabeth Cousins qualified for playoffs in the 2023 St. Paul Cash Spiel where she lost to the semifinal match to team Allory Johnson. Her team's performance in these events earned them enough WCF points to qualify for the 2024 United States Women's Curling Championship where they went 2-5 missing playoffs and finishing 7th place.

The start of the 2024-25 season proved to be much better for Team Cousins. They finished as runners up in the 2024 St. Paul Cash Spiel which automatically qualified them for the 2025 United States Women's Curling Championship hosted in Duluth, Minnesota. At the National Championship they improved to a 5-2 record and qualified for playoffs. As the #3 seed in the page playoff, Team Cousins defeated #4 seed Courtney Benson and #1 seed Christine McMakin in the semifinals. In the final vs Tabitha Peterson after a back-and-forth game, Team Cousins stole a point in the 10th end to tie the game at 6-6 and force an extra end where they eventually lost 7-6.

In the 2025-26 season, Team Cousins stayed together and pursued qualification for the 2026 Winter Olympics. As the #43 ranked team on World Curling Team Rankings List, they received an automatic berth for the 2025 United States Olympic curling trials. At the trials they finished 3-3 after round robin where they went to a tiebreaker game vs Delaney Strouse whom they defeated for a 3rd time that tournament. In the playoff finals vs Tabitha Peterson they lost a best-of-three series 0-2. Once again, Team Cousins qualified for 2026 United States Women's Curling Championship hosted in Charlotte, NC. Reigning champions, Tabitha Peterson announced after qualifying for the 2026 Winter Olympics at the 2025 Olympic Qualification Event, that they would withdraw from US Nationals leaving their title undefended. In Charlotte, Team Cousins finished 6-1 after round robin securing the #1 seed in playoffs. In the page playoff, they defeated Team Strouse and made the final for the 2nd year in a row. Team Strouse won the semifinal setting up a re-match in the final. Team Cousins lost the final to Delaney Strouse 6-9 and missed out on qualification for the 2026 World Women's Curling Championship at the Markin MacPhail Centre in Calgary, Alberta, Canada.

== Teams ==
=== Women's ===
Season	Skip	Third	Second	Lead	Alternate	Coach	Events
2014–15	Elizabeth Cousins	Elizabeth Cousins	Ivy Mancuso	Sydney Mullaney	Rebecca Rodgers	Karyn Cousins	2015 USJCC (7th)
2015–16	Elizabeth Cousins	Ivy Mancuso	Rane Anderson	Sydney Mullaney		Grayland Cousins	2016 USJCC (7th)
2016–17	Elizabeth Cousins	Rane Anderson	Sailor Anderson	Sydney Mullaney		Grayland Cousins	2017 USJCC (7th); 2017 USU18CC (silver)
2017–18	Elizabeth Cousins	Sydney Mullaney	Rane Anderson	Sailor Anderson		Grayland Cousins	DNQ
2018–19	Elizabeth Cousins	Katherine Gourianova	Elizabeth Janiak	Sydney Mullaney		Grayland Cousins	2019 USJCC (4th)
2019–20	Elizabeth Cousins	Katherine Gourianova	Elizabeth Janiak	Ariel Traxler (Skip)		Grayland Cousins	2020 USJCC (6th); 2020 USWCC (bronze)
2020–21	Jamie Sinclair	Monica Walker	Cora Farrell	Elizabeth Cousins		Mark Lazar	2021 USWCC (bronze)
2021–22	Jamie Sinclair	Monica Walker	Cora Farrell	Elizabeth Cousins		Mark Lazar	2021 USOCT (silver)
2022–23	Madison Bear	Annmarie Dubberstein	Elizabeth Cousins	Allison Howell	Elizabeth Janiak		2023 USWCC (4th)
2023-24	Elizabeth Cousins	Annmarie Dubberstein	Allison Howell	Elizabeth Janiak		Grayland Cousins	2024 USWCC (7th)
2024-25	Elizabeth Cousins	Annmarie Dubberstein	Allison Howell	Elizabeth Janiak		Grayland Cousins	2025 USWCC (silver)
2025–26	Elizabeth Cousins	Annmarie Dubberstein	Allison Howell	Elizabeth Janiak		Grayland Cousins	2025 USOCT (silver); 2026 USWCC (silver)
