= 2021 United States Olympic curling trials =

2021 United States Olympic Curling Trials
- Host city: Omaha, Nebraska
- Arena: Baxter Arena
- Dates: November 12–21
- Men's winner: (Minnesota) Team Shuster
- Curling club: Duluth CC, Duluth, MN
- Skip: John Shuster
- Third: Chris Plys
- Second: Matt Hamilton
- Lead: John Landsteiner
- Coach: Sean Beighton
- Finalist: (Minnesota) Korey Dropkin
- Women's winner: (Minnesota) Team Peterson
- Curling club: St. Paul CC, St. Paul, MN
- Skip: Tabitha Peterson
- Third: Nina Roth
- Second: Becca Hamilton
- Lead: Tara Peterson
- Alternate: Aileen Geving
- Coach: Laine Peters
- Finalist: (Minnesota) Cory Christensen

The 2021 United States Olympic Curling Trials was held from November 12 to 21, 2021 at the Baxter Arena in Omaha, Nebraska. The trials featured six men's teams and six women's teams who played in a double round robin tournament. After the round robin, the top two teams on each side played a best-of-three playoff to determine the winner. The winner of both the men's and women's events will represent the United States at the 2022 Winter Olympics in Beijing, China.

== Qualification ==
As both John Shuster and Tabitha Peterson finished within the top six teams at the 2021 World Men's Curling Championship and the 2021 World Women's Curling Championship respectively, the United States earned an automatic berth into the 2022 Winter Olympics in the men's and women's events.

The following teams qualified to participate in the 2021 Curling Olympic Trials:

=== Men ===
Qualification	Berths	Qualifying Team(s)
Winner of the 2020 United States Men's Curling Championship	1	(Minnesota) John Shuster
Highest two placing teams at the 2021 United States Men's Curling Championship	2	(Minnesota) Korey Dropkin (Minnesota) Jed Brundidge
Winners of Trials Qualifier #1	1	(Minnesota) Rich Ruohonen
Winners of Trials Qualifier #2	1	(Alaska) Greg Persinger
Highest ranking non-qualified team from the two qualifiers	1	(Pennsylvania) Scott Dunnam

=== Women ===
Qualification	Berths	Qualifying Team(s)
Winner of the 2020 United States Women's Curling Championship	1	(Minnesota) Tabitha Peterson
Highest two placing teams at the 2021 United States Women's Curling Championship	2	(Minnesota) Cory Christensen (North Carolina) Jamie Sinclair
Winners of Trials Qualifier #1	1	(Minnesota) Madison Bear
Winners of Trials Qualifier #2	1	(Minnesota) Delaney Strouse
Highest ranking non-qualified team from the two qualifiers	1	(Minnesota) Kim Rhyme

== Men ==
=== Teams ===
The teams are listed as follows:

Skip	Third	Second	Lead	Alternate	Coach	Locale
Jed Brundidge	Evan Workin	Lance Wheeler	Cameron Rittenour	Nic Wagner	Dave Jensen	Saint Paul, Minnesota
Korey Dropkin	Joe Polo	Mark Fenner	Thomas Howell	Alex Fenson	Tim Solin	Duluth, Minnesota
Scott Dunnam	Hunter Clawson	Cody Clouser	Andrew Dunnam	Daniel Dudt	Bruce Clouser	Philadelphia, Pennsylvania
Greg Persinger (fourth)	Alex Leichter	Ben Richardson	Craig Brown (skip)	Dominik Märki	Chase Sinnett	Fairbanks, Alaska
Rich Ruohonen	Andrew Stopera	Colin Hufman	Phil Tilker	Kroy Nernberger	Pete Annis	Minneapolis, Minnesota
John Shuster	Chris Plys	Matt Hamilton	John Landsteiner		Sean Beighton	Chaska, Minnesota

=== Round-robin standings ===
Final round-robin standings

Key
Teams to Playoff

Team	W	L	PF	PA	EW	EL	BE	SE
(Minnesota) John Shuster	9	1	83	41	46	31	2	16
(Minnesota) Korey Dropkin	7	3	69	52	43	37	5	13
(Minnesota) Rich Ruohonen	6	4	65	70	44	41	5	11
(Pennsylvania) Scott Dunnam	4	6	68	71	41	43	3	14
(Alaska) Greg Persinger	4	6	64	71	39	44	0	9
(Minnesota) Jed Brundidge	0	10	37	81	28	45	6	2

=== Round-robin results ===
All draws are listed in Central Time (UTC−06:00).

==== Draw 1 ====
Friday, November 12, 7:30 pm

Sheet 1	1	2	3	4	5	6	7	8	9	10	Final
(Alaska) Greg Persinger 🔨	0	1	0	3	0	3	0	2	0	2	11
(Minnesota) Rich Ruohonen	1	0	2	0	1	0	3	0	0	0	7

Sheet 2	1	2	3	4	5	6	7	8	9	10	Final
(Pennsylvania) Scott Dunnam	0	1	1	3	0	0	1	1	2	X	9
(Minnesota) Korey Dropkin 🔨	2	0	0	0	2	1	0	0	0	X	5

Sheet 3	1	2	3	4	5	6	7	8	9	10	Final
(Minnesota) John Shuster 🔨	3	1	1	1	2	1	X	X	X	X	9
(Minnesota) Jed Brundidge	0	0	0	0	0	0	X	X	X	X	0

==== Draw 2 ====
Saturday, November 13, 2:00 pm

Sheet 1	1	2	3	4	5	6	7	8	9	10	Final
(Pennsylvania) Scott Dunnam	0	1	0	0	0	1	1	0	X	X	3
(Minnesota) John Shuster 🔨	2	0	2	2	2	0	0	1	X	X	9

Sheet 2	1	2	3	4	5	6	7	8	9	10	Final
(Alaska) Greg Persinger 🔨	1	2	0	1	0	1	0	2	3	X	10
(Minnesota) Jed Brundidge	0	0	2	0	1	0	1	0	0	X	4

Sheet 3	1	2	3	4	5	6	7	8	9	10	Final
(Minnesota) Rich Ruohonen	0	0	2	0	0	1	0	0	1	X	4
(Minnesota) Korey Dropkin 🔨	0	4	0	1	0	0	1	1	0	X	7

==== Draw 3 ====
Sunday, November 14, 9:00 am

Sheet 1	1	2	3	4	5	6	7	8	9	10	Final
(Minnesota) Korey Dropkin 🔨	2	0	1	0	1	0	2	3	0	X	9
(Alaska) Greg Persinger	0	3	0	1	0	2	0	0	1	X	7

Sheet 2	1	2	3	4	5	6	7	8	9	10	Final
(Minnesota) Rich Ruohonen	0	1	0	1	0	2	0	1	0	X	5
(Minnesota) John Shuster 🔨	1	0	1	0	2	0	2	0	3	X	9

Sheet 3	1	2	3	4	5	6	7	8	9	10	Final
(Pennsylvania) Scott Dunnam 🔨	2	0	1	2	0	1	0	3	0	0	9
(Minnesota) Jed Brundidge	0	1	0	0	2	0	2	0	2	1	8

==== Draw 4 ====
Sunday, November 14, 7:00 pm

Sheet 1	1	2	3	4	5	6	7	8	9	10	Final
(Minnesota) Rich Ruohonen 🔨	0	1	0	1	2	0	2	1	0	1	8
(Pennsylvania) Scott Dunnam	1	0	1	0	0	2	0	0	3	0	7

Sheet 2	1	2	3	4	5	6	7	8	9	10	Final
(Minnesota) Jed Brundidge 🔨	1	1	0	1	0	0	0	1	0	1	5
(Minnesota) Korey Dropkin	0	0	2	0	0	1	1	0	2	0	6

Sheet 3	1	2	3	4	5	6	7	8	9	10	Final
(Alaska) Greg Persinger	0	1	0	0	1	0	2	0	0	X	4
(Minnesota) John Shuster 🔨	2	0	2	1	0	1	0	1	1	X	8

==== Draw 5 ====
Monday, November 15, 12:00 pm

Sheet 1	1	2	3	4	5	6	7	8	9	10	11	Final
(Minnesota) John Shuster 🔨	0	0	0	2	0	2	1	0	2	0	1	8
(Minnesota) Korey Dropkin	1	1	1	0	1	0	0	1	0	2	0	7

Sheet 2	1	2	3	4	5	6	7	8	9	10	Final
(Pennsylvania) Scott Dunnam 🔨	0	0	3	0	2	0	0	0	2	0	7
(Alaska) Greg Persinger	1	1	0	3	0	1	0	1	0	1	8

Sheet 3	1	2	3	4	5	6	7	8	9	10	Final
(Minnesota) Jed Brundidge 🔨	0	0	1	0	0	1	0	0	0	X	2
(Minnesota) Rich Ruohonen	1	0	0	3	1	0	0	0	0	X	5

==== Draw 6 ====
Monday, November 15, 8:00 pm

Sheet 1	1	2	3	4	5	6	7	8	9	10	Final
(Minnesota) Jed Brundidge 🔨	0	0	1	0	0	1	X	X	X	X	2
(Alaska) Greg Persinger	1	3	0	3	1	0	X	X	X	X	8

Sheet 2	1	2	3	4	5	6	7	8	9	10	Final
(Minnesota) Korey Dropkin	0	1	0	2	0	0	2	0	3	0	8
(Minnesota) Rich Ruohonen 🔨	2	0	1	0	3	1	0	2	0	2	11

Sheet 3	1	2	3	4	5	6	7	8	9	10	Final
(Minnesota) John Shuster 🔨	2	0	1	0	4	1	3	X	X	X	11
(Pennsylvania) Scott Dunnam	0	1	0	2	0	0	0	X	X	X	3

==== Draw 7 ====
Tuesday, November 16, 2:00 pm

Sheet 1	1	2	3	4	5	6	7	8	9	10	Final
(Minnesota) John Shuster 🔨	3	0	0	2	0	3	0	0	1	X	9
(Minnesota) Rich Ruohonen	0	1	1	0	1	0	2	0	0	X	5

Sheet 2	1	2	3	4	5	6	7	8	9	10	Final
(Minnesota) Jed Brundidge 🔨	1	0	0	3	0	0	1	0	0	X	5
(Pennsylvania) Scott Dunnam	0	1	0	0	3	2	0	3	1	X	10

Sheet 3	1	2	3	4	5	6	7	8	9	10	Final
(Alaska) Greg Persinger	0	0	1	0	1	0	X	X	X	X	2
(Minnesota) Korey Dropkin 🔨	1	3	0	2	0	2	X	X	X	X	8

==== Draw 8 ====
Wednesday, November 17, 9:00 am

Sheet 1	1	2	3	4	5	6	7	8	9	10	Final
(Minnesota) Korey Dropkin 🔨	2	0	0	1	2	0	0	1	1	X	7
(Minnesota) Jed Brundidge	0	0	1	0	0	0	1	0	0	X	2

Sheet 2	1	2	3	4	5	6	7	8	9	10	Final
(Minnesota) John Shuster	1	0	1	0	2	0	1	1	2	X	8
(Alaska) Greg Persinger 🔨	0	2	0	1	0	1	0	0	0	X	4

Sheet 3	1	2	3	4	5	6	7	8	9	10	Final
(Pennsylvania) Scott Dunnam	0	0	0	1	2	1	0	1	1	0	6
(Minnesota) Rich Ruohonen 🔨	2	0	3	0	0	0	1	0	0	1	7

==== Draw 9 ====
Wednesday, November 17, 7:00 pm

Sheet 1	1	2	3	4	5	6	7	8	9	10	Final
(Alaska) Greg Persinger	0	0	2	0	0	2	0	X	X	X	4
(Pennsylvania) Scott Dunnam 🔨	1	1	0	1	2	0	6	X	X	X	11

Sheet 2	1	2	3	4	5	6	7	8	9	10	Final
(Minnesota) Rich Ruohonen	0	2	0	1	0	2	0	1	0	X	6
(Minnesota) Jed Brundidge 🔨	0	0	1	0	1	0	2	0	1	X	5

Sheet 3	1	2	3	4	5	6	7	8	9	10	Final
(Minnesota) Korey Dropkin	0	0	0	0	1	2	1	2	X	X	6
(Minnesota) John Shuster 🔨	0	1	0	0	0	0	0	0	X	X	1

==== Draw 10 ====
Thursday, November 18, 2:00 pm

Sheet 1	1	2	3	4	5	6	7	8	9	10	Final
(Minnesota) Jed Brundidge 🔨	0	1	0	3	0	0	X	X	X	X	4
(Minnesota) John Shuster	0	0	2	0	4	5	X	X	X	X	11

Sheet 2	1	2	3	4	5	6	7	8	9	10	Final
(Minnesota) Korey Dropkin 🔨	0	1	0	2	0	1	0	2	0	X	6
(Pennsylvania) Scott Dunnam	0	0	1	0	0	0	1	0	1	X	3

Sheet 3	1	2	3	4	5	6	7	8	9	10	Final
(Minnesota) Rich Ruohonen	1	0	1	1	0	1	0	2	0	1	7
(Alaska) Greg Persinger 🔨	0	1	0	0	1	0	1	0	3	0	6

=== Playoff ===
The final round was between the top two teams at the end of the round robin. The teams played a best-of-three series.

Best-of-three
1	(Minnesota) John Shuster	4	7	5
2	(Minnesota) Korey Dropkin	8	3	4

==== Game 1 ====
Friday, November 19, 5:00 pm

Sheet 2	1	2	3	4	5	6	7	8	9	10	Final
(Minnesota) John Shuster 🔨	0	1	0	1	1	0	1	X	X	X	4
(Minnesota) Korey Dropkin	2	0	3	0	0	3	0	X	X	X	8

==== Game 2 ====
Saturday, November 20, 5:00 pm

Sheet 2	1	2	3	4	5	6	7	8	9	10	Final
(Minnesota) Korey Dropkin 🔨	0	2	0	0	0	0	1	0	0	0	3
(Minnesota) John Shuster	0	0	0	1	0	2	0	0	2	2	7

==== Game 3 ====
Sunday, November 21, 5:00 pm

Sheet 2	1	2	3	4	5	6	7	8	9	10	Final
(Minnesota) Korey Dropkin	0	0	0	1	0	0	0	0	2	1	4
(Minnesota) John Shuster 🔨	0	0	1	0	0	2	1	1	0	0	5

== Women ==
=== Teams ===
The teams are listed as follows:

Skip	Third	Second	Lead	Alternate	Coach	Locale
Madison Bear	Annmarie Dubberstein	Taylor Drees	Allison Howell		Jordan Moulton	Chaska, Minnesota
Cory Christensen	Sarah Anderson	Vicky Persinger	Taylor Anderson		Cathy Overton-Clapham	Chaska, Minnesota
Tabitha Peterson	Nina Roth	Becca Hamilton	Tara Peterson	Aileen Geving	Laine Peters	Chaska, Minnesota
Kim Rhyme	Libby Brundage	Cait Flannery	Katie Rhyme	Lexi Lanigan	Bill Rhyme	Minneapolis, Minnesota
Jamie Sinclair	Monica Walker	Cora Farrell	Elizabeth Cousins		Mark Lazar	Charlotte, North Carolina
Delaney Strouse	Anne O'Hara	Sydney Mullaney	Rebecca Rodgers	Susan Dudt	Amy Harnden	Minneapolis, Minnesota

=== Round-robin standings ===
Final round-robin standings

Key
Teams to Playoff

Team	W	L	PF	PA	EW	EL	BE	SE
(Minnesota) Tabitha Peterson	9	1	87	46	46	35	4	16
(Minnesota) Cory Christensen	7	3	72	62	41	38	2	10
(North Carolina) Jamie Sinclair	4	6	65	72	39	44	3	8
(Minnesota) Kim Rhyme	4	6	60	74	38	41	6	8
(Minnesota) Delaney Strouse	3	7	67	80	45	47	3	12
(Minnesota) Madison Bear	3	7	53	70	38	42	5	13

=== Round-robin results ===
All draws are listed in Central Time (UTC−06:00).

==== Draw 1 ====
Saturday, November 13, 9:00 am

Sheet 2	1	2	3	4	5	6	7	8	9	10	Final
(Minnesota) Cory Christensen	3	0	0	0	3	3	X	X	X	X	9
(Minnesota) Kim Rhyme 🔨	0	1	0	0	0	0	X	X	X	X	1

Sheet 3	1	2	3	4	5	6	7	8	9	10	Final
(Minnesota) Delaney Strouse	1	0	1	0	1	0	0	1	1	X	5
(Minnesota) Tabitha Peterson 🔨	0	2	0	1	0	3	2	0	0	X	8

Sheet 4	1	2	3	4	5	6	7	8	9	10	Final
(Minnesota) Madison Bear	1	1	0	2	3	1	2	X	X	X	10
(North Carolina) Jamie Sinclair 🔨	0	0	2	0	0	0	0	X	X	X	2

==== Draw 2 ====
Saturday, November 13, 7:00 pm

Sheet 2	1	2	3	4	5	6	7	8	9	10	Final
(Minnesota) Delaney Strouse 🔨	1	1	3	0	0	1	0	1	1	X	8
(Minnesota) Madison Bear	0	0	0	1	1	0	1	0	0	X	3

Sheet 3	1	2	3	4	5	6	7	8	9	10	Final
(Minnesota) Cory Christensen	0	1	3	0	1	0	1	3	0	X	9
(North Carolina) Jamie Sinclair 🔨	1	0	0	2	0	1	0	0	2	X	6

Sheet 4	1	2	3	4	5	6	7	8	9	10	Final
(Minnesota) Kim Rhyme 🔨	1	0	1	0	0	1	1	0	2	1	7
(Minnesota) Tabitha Peterson	0	1	0	2	1	0	0	1	0	0	5

==== Draw 3 ====
Sunday, November 14, 2:00 pm

Sheet 2	1	2	3	4	5	6	7	8	9	10	Final
(Minnesota) Tabitha Peterson 🔨	2	0	1	0	0	4	1	0	1	X	9
(Minnesota) Cory Christensen	0	2	0	1	0	0	0	2	0	X	5

Sheet 3	1	2	3	4	5	6	7	8	9	10	Final
(Minnesota) Kim Rhyme	0	3	0	0	1	1	0	0	3	X	8
(Minnesota) Madison Bear 🔨	1	0	0	2	0	0	0	1	0	X	4

Sheet 4	1	2	3	4	5	6	7	8	9	10	Final
(Minnesota) Delaney Strouse 🔨	2	0	0	1	2	0	1	1	0	0	7
(North Carolina) Jamie Sinclair	0	2	2	0	0	1	0	0	2	1	8

==== Draw 4 ====
Monday, November 15, 8:00 am

Sheet 2	1	2	3	4	5	6	7	8	9	10	Final
(Minnesota) Kim Rhyme	0	2	0	1	0	1	0	3	2	1	10
(Minnesota) Delaney Strouse 🔨	2	0	2	0	2	0	3	0	0	0	9

Sheet 3	1	2	3	4	5	6	7	8	9	10	Final
(North Carolina) Jamie Sinclair 🔨	1	1	1	0	0	2	0	0	2	0	7
(Minnesota) Tabitha Peterson	0	0	0	2	1	0	1	2	0	2	8

Sheet 4	1	2	3	4	5	6	7	8	9	10	Final
(Minnesota) Cory Christensen 🔨	2	0	0	1	0	2	1	0	1	1	8
(Minnesota) Madison Bear	0	1	1	0	1	0	0	2	0	0	5

==== Draw 5 ====
Monday, November 15, 4:00 pm

Sheet 2	1	2	3	4	5	6	7	8	9	10	Final
(Minnesota) Madison Bear 🔨	0	1	0	2	0	0	0	X	X	X	3
(Minnesota) Tabitha Peterson	2	0	4	0	0	1	2	X	X	X	9

Sheet 3	1	2	3	4	5	6	7	8	9	10	Final
(Minnesota) Delaney Strouse	0	2	0	0	0	1	0	3	0	0	6
(Minnesota) Cory Christensen 🔨	1	0	2	0	0	0	1	0	2	2	8

Sheet 4	1	2	3	4	5	6	7	8	9	10	Final
(North Carolina) Jamie Sinclair 🔨	0	2	0	0	2	0	2	2	0	X	8
(Minnesota) Kim Rhyme	0	0	1	0	0	2	0	0	2	X	5

==== Draw 6 ====
Tuesday, November 16, 9:00 am

Sheet 2	1	2	3	4	5	6	7	8	9	10	Final
(North Carolina) Jamie Sinclair 🔨	1	0	1	0	3	0	3	2	X	X	10
(Minnesota) Cory Christensen	0	1	0	1	0	1	0	0	X	X	3

Sheet 3	1	2	3	4	5	6	7	8	9	10	Final
(Minnesota) Tabitha Peterson 🔨	2	0	1	0	0	1	0	2	1	X	7
(Minnesota) Kim Rhyme	0	1	0	0	1	0	1	0	0	X	3

Sheet 4	1	2	3	4	5	6	7	8	9	10	Final
(Minnesota) Madison Bear 🔨	0	1	0	2	1	1	1	0	1	X	7
(Minnesota) Delaney Strouse	0	0	1	0	0	0	0	1	0	X	2

==== Draw 7 ====
Tuesday, November 16, 7:00 pm

Sheet 2	1	2	3	4	5	6	7	8	9	10	Final
(Minnesota) Madison Bear	0	0	0	0	0	1	0	3	3	1	8
(Minnesota) Kim Rhyme 🔨	0	0	2	2	2	0	1	0	0	0	7

Sheet 3	1	2	3	4	5	6	7	8	9	10	11	Final
(North Carolina) Jamie Sinclair	0	0	3	0	1	0	2	0	2	0	0	8
(Minnesota) Delaney Strouse 🔨	0	2	0	2	0	2	0	1	0	1	1	9

Sheet 4	1	2	3	4	5	6	7	8	9	10	Final
(Minnesota) Cory Christensen	0	0	0	3	0	0	0	1	0	X	4
(Minnesota) Tabitha Peterson 🔨	3	1	2	0	0	0	2	0	1	X	9

==== Draw 8 ====
Wednesday, November 17, 2:00 pm

Sheet 2	1	2	3	4	5	6	7	8	9	10	Final
(Minnesota) Tabitha Peterson	0	3	2	2	2	0	X	X	X	X	9
(North Carolina) Jamie Sinclair 🔨	2	0	0	0	0	1	X	X	X	X	3

Sheet 3	1	2	3	4	5	6	7	8	9	10	Final
(Minnesota) Madison Bear 🔨	0	0	1	0	1	0	2	0	0	X	4
(Minnesota) Cory Christensen	1	0	0	1	0	4	0	1	1	X	8

Sheet 4	1	2	3	4	5	6	7	8	9	10	Final
(Minnesota) Delaney Strouse 🔨	1	2	0	0	1	2	0	3	0	1	10
(Minnesota) Kim Rhyme	0	0	1	1	0	0	2	0	2	0	6

==== Draw 9 ====
Thursday, November 18, 9:00 am

Sheet 2	1	2	3	4	5	6	7	8	9	10	Final
(Minnesota) Cory Christensen 🔨	3	0	0	2	0	1	0	1	0	1	8
(Minnesota) Delaney Strouse	0	2	1	0	1	0	1	0	1	0	6

Sheet 3	1	2	3	4	5	6	7	8	9	10	Final
(Minnesota) Kim Rhyme 🔨	1	0	1	0	2	0	0	0	3	X	7
(North Carolina) Jamie Sinclair	0	1	0	1	0	1	0	1	0	X	4

Sheet 4	1	2	3	4	5	6	7	8	9	10	Final
(Minnesota) Tabitha Peterson 🔨	2	1	0	1	0	2	0	0	3	X	9
(Minnesota) Madison Bear	0	0	1	0	1	0	1	1	0	X	4

==== Draw 10 ====
Thursday, November 18, 7:00 pm

Sheet 2	1	2	3	4	5	6	7	8	9	10	Final
(North Carolina) Jamie Sinclair 🔨	0	2	0	1	0	2	0	1	0	3	9
(Minnesota) Madison Bear	0	0	0	0	2	0	2	0	1	0	5

Sheet 3	1	2	3	4	5	6	7	8	9	10	Final
(Minnesota) Tabitha Peterson 🔨	3	0	0	3	3	0	1	4	X	X	14
(Minnesota) Delaney Strouse	0	1	3	0	0	1	0	0	X	X	5

Sheet 4	1	2	3	4	5	6	7	8	9	10	Final
(Minnesota) Kim Rhyme 🔨	0	1	0	0	0	3	0	2	0	X	6
(Minnesota) Cory Christensen	0	0	6	0	2	0	1	0	1	X	10

=== Playoff ===
The final round was between the top two teams at the end of the round robin. The teams played a best-of-three series.

Best-of-three
1	(Minnesota) Tabitha Peterson	8	9	X
2	(Minnesota) Cory Christensen	7	4	X

==== Game 1 ====
Friday, November 19, 8:00 pm

Sheet 3	1	2	3	4	5	6	7	8	9	10	Final
(Minnesota) Tabitha Peterson 🔨	2	1	0	1	0	3	0	1	0	0	8
(Minnesota) Cory Christensen	0	0	2	0	3	0	1	0	1	0	7

==== Game 2 ====
Saturday, November 20, 8:00 pm

Sheet 3	1	2	3	4	5	6	7	8	9	10	Final
(Minnesota) Tabitha Peterson	1	1	0	3	1	0	2	1	X	X	9
(Minnesota) Cory Christensen 🔨	0	0	2	0	0	2	0	0	X	X	4
