= Madison Bear =

American curler (born 1997)

- Curler
- Born: April 26, 1997 (age 29); Portage, Wisconsin, U.S.

Team
- Curling club: Portage CC, Portage, WI
- Mixed doubles partner: Aidan Oldenburg

Curling career
- Member Association: United States
- World Championship: 1 (2026)
Medal record
Representing United States
Women's curling
World Junior Curling Championships
Silver medal – second place	2016 Copenhagen
Representing Minnesota
U.S. Olympic Trials
Bronze medal – third place	2025 Lafayette	Mixed doubles
United States National Championships
Gold medal – first place	2026 Charlotte
Bronze medal – third place	2016 Jacksonville
Bronze medal – third place	2019 Kalamazoo
Bronze medal – third place	2021 Wausau
United States Mixed Doubles Championship
Silver medal – second place	2021 Wausau

Madison Bear (born April 26, 1997) is an American curler, originally from Portage, Wisconsin. As a junior curler, Bear was a two-time United States champion and a World runner-up.

== Career ==
=== Juniors ===
Bear first competed at the United States Junior Curling Championship in 2015, as skip of a team consisting of Jenna Burchesky at third, Allison Howell at second and Annmarie Dubberstein at lead. Despite being newcomers on the national stage, Team Bear made it to the finals where they lost to defending champion Cory Christensen.

The following season, Bear joined Christensen's team as lead. The team also included Sarah Anderson and Taylor Anderson. With Team Christensen, Bear won her first World Curling Tour event, going undefeated at the 2015 St. Paul Cash Spiel. At the 2016 Junior National Championship, Bear earned her first Junior National title when the team finished with a perfect 11–0 record, never needing to play a full ten end game. Winning Junior Nationals earned Team Christensen a spot at the Women's National Championship in Jacksonville, Florida, where they earned the fourth seed in the playoffs with a 3–3 round-robin record. They defeated Jamie Sinclair in the 3 vs 4 page playoff game, but then lost to Nina Roth in the semifinals, earning themselves the bronze medal.

Winning the Junior National Championship also earned Bear her first opportunity to represent the United States at the World Junior Championships in Copenhagen. Bear's team finished the round-robin with a 7–2 record, good enough for the second seed in the page playoff system. In the 1 vs 2 playoff game, Team Christensen defeated the number one seed Canada, skipped by Mary Fay. This gave the United States a path straight to the final where they ultimately faced Canada again, this time losing 4–7 to earn the silver medal.

For the 2016–17 season Bear was back to skipping her own team, this time composed of Cora Farrell, Cait Flannery, and Lexi Lanigan. Team Bear got silver at the 2017 Junior Nationals, losing to Annmarie Dubberstein in the final. Bear still returned to the World Juniors as alternate for Dubberstein's team and finished in 7th place.

In her final season as a junior curler, Bear joined back with her original juniors teammates: Dubberstein, Burchesky, and Howell. They won the gold medal at the 2018 United States Junior National Championship, earning Bear her third straight trip to World Juniors. At the 2018 World Junior Championships in Aberdeen, Scotland, Bear and her team just missed the playoffs, finishing in fifth place.

=== Women ===
Out of juniors for the 2018–19 curling season, Bear rejoined Christensen's team as lead. The team also added a new coach, Canadian Darah Blandford, in her first year with the USCA High Performance Program. Team Christensen was chosen to represent the United States at the third leg of the Curling World Cup in Jönköping, Sweden; the Curling World Cup was a four-part international tournament held around the world throughout the curling season. There they finished with a 3–3 record. At the 2019 United States Women's Championship they finished the round-robin with a record of 5–2, good enough for the third seed in the page playoffs. In the 3 vs. 4 playoff game they defeated Stephanie Senneker's team by one point, 9–8. In the semifinal match against Nina Roth's team, it came down to the last stone, but, as she did three years prior, Roth came through with the win, resulting in the bronze medal for Team Christensen.

Shortly after the season ended, it was announced that Christensen's team was dissolving and Bear would again skip her own team. For the 2019–20 season Jenna Burchesky and Lexi Lanigan rejoined Bear, along with Katie Dubberstein and Emily Quello. Bear failed to qualify for the 2020 United States Women's Championship, getting knocked out of the Challenge Round with a 2–3 record. The next offseason brought another team change for Bear as in June 2020, the United States Curling Association announced she would be the skip of the new women's U-25 national team. The U-25 team program, which stands for under 25 years old, was added in 2020 as a new part of the High Performance Program with the intention of bridging the development gap between juniors and women's curling.

=== Mixed doubles ===
Bear also was selected, along with teammate Andrew Stopera, to be the U-25 mixed doubles national team for the 2020–21 season. Despite a difficult year marred by COVID-19, Bear made the most of her 2020–21 season. At the "bubble" in Wausau, Wisconsin, Bear won the silver medal at the 2021 US Mixed Doubles Championship. The silver medal qualified her and Stopera for the 2021 United States Mixed Doubles Curling Olympic Trials, where they finished 9th with a 3–6 record.

Bear joined forces with Aidan Oldenburg starting in the 2023–24 season, where they finished in 9th at the 2024 United States Mixed Doubles Curling Championship with a 4-3 record. Bear and Oldenburg would finish 2nd at the 2024 United States Mixed Doubles Olympic Pre-Trials, qualifying them for the 2025 United States Mixed Doubles Curling Olympic Trials. At the Trials, Bear and Oldenburg would finish 3rd, losing to Sarah Anderson and Andrew Stopera 7–5 in the semifinal.

== Personal life ==
Bear lives in Madison, Wisconsin and employed as a licensed professional mental health counselor.

== Teams ==
=== Women's ===
Season	Skip	Third	Second	Lead	Alternate	Coach	Events
2014–15	Madison Bear	Jenna Burchesky	Allison Howell	Annmarie Dubberstein			2015 USJCC (silver)
2015–16	Cory Christensen	Sarah Anderson	Taylor Anderson	Madison Bear	Christine McMakin	Dave Jensen	2016 USJCC (gold); 2016 USWCC (bronze); 2016 WJCC (silver)
2016–17	Madison Bear	Cora Farrell	Cait Flannery	Lexi Lanigan	Rebecca Miles		2017 USJCC (silver)
2016–17	Annmarie Dubberstein	Christine McMakin	Jenna Burchesky	Allison Howell	Madison Bear		2017 WJCC (7th)
2017–18	Madison Bear	Annmarie Dubberstein	Jenna Burchesky	Allison Howell	Leah Yavarow (Note: for WJCC)		2018 USJCC (gold); 2018 WJCC (5th)
2018–19	Cory Christensen	Vicky Persinger	Jenna Martin	Madison Bear		Darah Blandford	CWC/3 (5th); 2019 USWCC (bronze)
2019–20	Madison Bear	Jenna Burchesky	Katie Dubberstein	Lexi Lanigan	Emily Quello	Darah Blandford	
2020–21	Madison Bear	Annmarie Dubberstein	Taylor Drees	Allison Howell		Jordan Moulton	2021 USWCC (bronze)
2021–22	Madison Bear	Annmarie Dubberstein	Taylor Drees	Allison Howell			2021 USOCT (6th)
2022–23	Madison Bear	Annmarie Dubberstein	Elizabeth Cousins	Allison Howell			2023 USWCC (4th)
2025–26	Delaney Strouse	Anne O'Hara	Sydney Mullaney	Madison Bear		Mike Harris	2026 USWCC (gold); 2026 WWCC (12th)

=== Mixed doubles ===
Season	Female	Male	Events
2019–20	Madison Bear	Andrew Stopera	2020 USMDCC (8th)
2020–21	Madison Bear	Andrew Stopera	2021 USMDCC (silver)
2021–22	Madison Bear	Andrew Stopera	2021 USMDOCT (9th)
2023–24	Madison Bear	Aidan Oldenburg	2024 USMDCC (9th)
2024–25	Madison Bear	Aidan Oldenburg	2025 USMDOT (bronze)
2026–27	Madison Bear	Aidan Oldenburg	
