= Tara Peterson =

American curler (born 1991)

- Curler
- Born: May 28, 1991 (age 35); Burnsville, Minnesota, U.S.

Team
- Curling club: St. Paul CC, St. Paul, MN
- Skip: Tabitha Peterson
- Third: Cory Thiesse
- Second: Tara Peterson
- Lead: Taylor Anderson-Heide

Curling career
- Member Association: United States
- World Championship: 6 (2014, 2015, 2021, 2023, 2024, 2025)
- Pan Continental Championship: 4 (2022, 2023, 2024, 2025)
- Olympic: 2 (2022, 2026)
Medal record
Women's curling
Representing United States
World Championships
| Bronze medal – third place | 2021 Calgary |
Pan Continental Championships
| Bronze medal – third place | 2023 Kelowna |
World Junior Championships
| Bronze medal – third place | 2010 Flims |
Representing Minnesota
United States Olympic Trials
| Gold medal – first place | 2021 Omaha |
| Gold medal – first place | 2025 Sioux Falls |
United States Women's Championship
| Gold medal – first place | 2014 Philadelphia |
| Gold medal – first place | 2020 Cheney |
| Gold medal – first place | 2023 Denver |
| Gold medal – first place | 2024 East Rutherford |
| Gold medal – first place | 2025 Duluth |
| Bronze medal – third place | 2015 Kalamazoo |

Tara S. Peterson (born May 28, 1991) is an American curler from Shoreview, Minnesota. She currently plays second for her sister Tabitha.

== Career ==
As a junior curler, Peterson won three United States Junior Curling Championships, qualifying her to play in the 2009, 2010, and 2011 World Junior Curling Championships. At the 2009 World Junior Curling Championships, Peterson played second for the Alexandra Carlson team and finished in 5th place. The following season, Peterson remained on the Carlson rink, and at the 2010 World Junior Curling Championships, the team won the bronze medal for the United States. The following year, Peterson joined the Wisconsin-based Rebecca Hamilton team at third. At the 2011 World Junior Curling Championships, the team finished in 5th. In 2012, they finished in third place at the U.S. Junior Championships.

After juniors, Peterson continued to play with Hamilton for one season (at second) until joining the Nina Roth rink in 2013 as her second. Peterson competed at the 2014 Ford World Women's Curling Championship as the alternate on team USA, skipped by Allison Pottinger (finished 6th). In 2014, she joined the Aileen Sormunen rink. With Sormunen, Peterson won her first World Curling Tour event at the 2014 St. Paul Cash Spiel. She also played in her first Grand Slam event that season, going all the way to the semifinals of the 2014 Colonial Square Ladies Classic. The team acquired enough WCT Order of Merit Points to qualify as the U.S. National team for the 2015 World Women's Curling Championship.

At the 2020 United States Women's Championship, Peterson earned her second national title, as second for her sister Tabitha. In the round robin, Team Peterson's only loss came against Jamie Sinclair, but they then beat Team Sinclair in the 1 vs. 2 page playoff game and again in the final. As United States Champions Team Peterson would have represented the United States at the 2020 World Women's Curling Championship, but they lost that opportunity when the Championship was cancelled due to the COVID-19 pandemic. They also earned a spot at the final Grand Slam of the season, the Champions Cup, which was also cancelled due to the pandemic. Their qualification will instead carry over to the 2021 Champions Cup.

During the 2020 off-season, the team announced that Tabitha Peterson would remain as skip when Roth returned from maternity leave. Roth re-joined the team as vice-skip at third, with Hamilton moving to second, Tara Peterson to lead, and Geving to alternate. Due to the COVID-19 pandemic, the Peterson team did not compete in events for most of the 2020–21 season until entering a bio-secure bubble held in Calgary, Alberta in the spring of 2021 for three events in a row. The first two events were the Champions Cup and Players' Championship grand slams, with the team missing the playoffs at both. The third event in the Calgary bubble for Team Peterson was the 2021 World Women's Championship, in which they earned a spot as 2020 National Champions after the 2021 National Championship was moved to later in the spring due to the pandemic. They finished the 13-game round-robin in fifth place with a 7–6 record, earning them a spot in the playoffs and securing a 2022 Olympic berth for the United States. In the playoffs, Team Peterson defeated Denmark's Madeline Dupont but lost to Switzerland's Silvana Tirinzoni to end up in the bronze medal game. There, Peterson faced off against Sweden's Anna Hasselborg and won with a score of 9–5, including scoring five points in the seventh end. Team Peterson's bronze medal finish was the first World Women's medal for the United States in 15 years, and the first-ever bronze medal.

The Peterson rink won their first two events of the 2021–22 season, the US Open of Curling and the 2021 Curlers Corner Autumn Gold Curling Classic. The following week, they played in the 2021 Masters where they made it as far as the quarterfinals. The team then played in the 2021 United States Olympic Curling Trials, where they attempted to return to the Olympics. Through the round robin, the team posted a 9–1 record, putting them into the best-of-three final against Cory Christensen. The Peterson rink beat Christensen in two-straight games, booking their tickets to the 2022 Winter Olympics. After the Trials, the team played in one event before the Olympics, the Curl Mesabi Classic, which they won, beating Christensen again in the final. At the Olympics, the team finished the round robin with a 4–5 record, missing the playoffs. The team finished off the season by playing in two Slams, the 2022 Players' Championship and the 2022 Champions Cup, missing the playoffs in both events.

Following the 2021–22 season, Nina Roth retired from competitive curling and the team added Cory Thiesse (née Christensen) as their new third. After a semifinal finish at the US Open of Curling, the team missed the playoffs at both the 2022 National and the 2022 Tour Challenge Slam events. They represented the United States at the 2022 Pan Continental Curling Championships where they finished first in the round robin with a 7–1 record. They then lost to South Korea and Canada in the semifinal and bronze medal game respectively, finishing fourth. In their next event, Team Peterson reached the semifinals of the Red Deer Curling Classic where they lost to Rachel Homan. At the 2022 Masters, the team made it to the semifinals before losing to the Einarson rink. The following week, they won the Curl Mesabi Classic. In the new year, the team went undefeated to claim the 2023 United States Women's Curling Championship, defeating Delaney Strouse 8–5 in the final. This qualified them for the 2023 World Women's Curling Championship where they finished just outside the playoffs with a 6–6 record. The team ended their season at the 2023 Players' Championship and the 2023 Champions Cup Grand Slam events where they reached the quarterfinals and semifinals respectively.

Team Peterson won their second event of the 2023–24 season, losing just one game en route to claiming the US Open of Curling. They also had a semifinal finish at the 2023 Stu Sells Oakville Tankard and a quarterfinal appearance at the 2023 Curlers Corner Autumn Gold Curling Classic. For the 2023 Pan Continental Curling Championships, the team changed their lineup with Peterson and Becca Hamilton switching positions to second and lead on the team respectively. The move worked as they finished 6–1 through the round robin. After a semifinal loss to Japan's Satsuki Fujisawa, Team Peterson bounced back to claim the bronze medal, stealing in an extra end to defeat Canada's Kerri Einarson. In Grand Slam play, they only qualified in one of the four events they played in, the 2023 Masters, losing in the quarterfinals to Silvana Tirinzoni. At the 2024 United States Women's Curling Championship, the Peterson rink lost their first game to Sarah Anderson before running the table the rest of the event. In the final, they doubled up on Team Anderson 10–5 to defend their title as national champions and qualify for the 2024 World Women's Curling Championship. At Worlds, the team struggled to find consistency, ultimately finishing 6–6 and failing to reach the playoffs for a second year in a row. Hamilton would announce that she would be stepping back from women's curling at the end of the season. Team Peterson would later announce that Taylor Anderson-Heide would be joining the team as their new lead.

Team Peterson would win the 2025 United States Olympic curling trials, qualifying them to represent the United States at the 2025 Olympic Qualification Event. There, they would finish round robin play with a 5–2 record, then beat Norway's Marianne Rørvik 8–4 to qualify for the 2026 Winter Olympics.

== Personal life ==
Peterson's sister is fellow curler Tabitha Peterson. She is employed as a dentist and is married.

== Teams ==
| Season | Skip | Third | Second | Lead | Alternate | Coach | Events |
|---|---|---|---|---|---|---|---|
| 2005–06 | Alex Carlson | Tabitha Peterson | Tara Peterson | Sophie Brorson | | | 2006 USJCC (SF) |
| 2006–07 | Alex Carlson | Tabitha Peterson | Tara Peterson | Sophie Brorson | | | 2007 USWCC (4th) |
| 2007–08 | Alex Carlson | Tabitha Peterson | Tara Peterson | Sophie Brorson | | | 2008 USJCC (silver) |
| 2008–09 | Alex Carlson | Tabitha Peterson | Tara Peterson | Sophie Brorson | Molly Bonner | Howard Restall | 2009 USJCC (gold); 2009 WJCC (5th) |
| 2009–10 | Alex Carlson | Tabitha Peterson | Tara Peterson | Sophie Brorson | Miranda Solem | Howard Restall | 2010 USJCC (gold); 2010 WJCC (bronze) |
| 2010–11 | Becca Hamilton | Tara Peterson | Karlie Koenig | Sophie Brorson | Rebecca Funk (WJCC) | Neil Doese (WJCC) | 2011 USJCC (gold); 2011 WJCC (5th) |
| 2011–12 | Becca Hamilton | Tara Peterson | Karlie Koenig | Sophie Brorson | | | 2012 USJCC (bronze); 2012 USWCC (7th) |
| 2012–13 | Becca Hamilton | Molly Bonner | Tara Peterson | Sophie Brorson | | | 2013 USWCC (8th) |
| 2013–14 | Allison Pottinger | Nicole Joraanstad | Natalie Nicholson | Tabitha Peterson | Tara Peterson | Derek Brown | 2014 USWCC (silver); 2014 WWCC (6th) |
| 2014–15 | Aileen Sormunen | Tara Peterson | Vicky Persinger | Monica Walker | Becca Hamilton (WWCC) | Scott Baird | 2015 USWCC (bronze); 2015 WWCC (10th) |
| 2015–16 | Jamie Sinclair | Tabitha Peterson | Becca Hamilton | Jenna Haag | Tara Peterson | | 2016 USWCC (4th) |
| 2018–19 | Nina Roth | Tabitha Peterson | Becca Hamilton | Tara Peterson | | | 2019 USWCC (silver); CWC/GF (6th) |
| 2019–20 | Tabitha Peterson | Becca Hamilton | Tara Peterson | Aileen Geving | | Natalie Nicholson | 2020 USWCC (gold) |
| 2020–21 | Tabitha Peterson | Nina Roth | Becca Hamilton | Tara Peterson | Aileen Geving | Laine Peters | 2021 WWCC (bronze) |
| 2021–22 | Tabitha Peterson | Nina Roth | Becca Hamilton | Tara Peterson | Aileen Geving | Laine Peters, Phill Drobnick | 2021 USOCT (gold); 2022 WOG (6th) |
| 2022–23 | Tabitha Peterson | Cory Thiesse | Becca Hamilton | Tara Peterson | Vicky Persinger (PCCC/WWCC) | Laine Peters | 2022 PCCC (4th); 2023 USWCC (gold); 2023 WWCC (7th) |
| 2023–24 | Tabitha Peterson | Cory Thiesse | Tara Peterson | Becca Hamilton | Vicky Persinger (PCCC/WWCC) | Cathy Overton-Clapham | 2023 PCCC (bronze); 2024 USWCC (gold); 2024 WWCC (7th) |
| 2024–25 | Tabitha Peterson | Cory Thiesse | Tara Peterson | Taylor Anderson-Heide | Vicky Persinger | Cathy Overton-Clapham | 2025 USWCC (gold); 2025 WWCC (12th) |
| 2024–25 | Cory Thiesse | Vicky Persinger | Tara Peterson | Taylor Anderson-Heide | Aileen Geving | Cathy Overton-Clapham | 2024 PCCC (5th) |
| 2025–26 | Tabitha Peterson | Cory Thiesse | Tara Peterson | Taylor Anderson-Heide | | Cathy Overton-Clapham | |
