= 2013 Canadian Junior Curling Championships – Women's tournament =

2013 Canadian Junior Curling Championships Women's tournament
- Host city: Fort McMurray, Alberta
- Arena: Suncor Community Leisure Centre; Oilsands Curling Club
- Dates: January 31 – February 10
- Winner: British Columbia
- Curling club: Kamloops Curling Club, Kamloops
- Skip: Corryn Brown
- Third: Erin Pincott
- Second: Samantha Fisher
- Lead: Sydney Fraser
- Finalist: Manitoba (Shannon Birchard)

The women's tournament of the 2013 Canadian Junior Curling Championships was held from January 31 to February 10 at the Suncor Community Leisure Centre at MacDonald Island Park and at the Oilsands Curling Club in Fort McMurray, Alberta.

== Competition format ==
All of the teams will compete in a round robin tournament consisting of two pools of seven teams each. At the conclusion of the preliminary round robin, the top four teams in each pool advance to the championship pool, while the rest of the teams move to the seeding pool. The teams in both the championship and seeding pools will play against the teams from their other pools. At the conclusion of the championship and seeding pools, the win–loss records of both pools will be combined for the final ranking. The top three teams in this ranking advance to the playoffs, where the second- and third-ranked teams will play in the semifinal, and the winner of the semifinal will play the first-ranked team in the final.

== Teams ==
The teams are listed as follows:

Province	Skip	Third	Second	Lead	Club(s)
Alberta	Karynn Flory	Holly Jamieson	Klara Smiley	Katie Roskewich	Crestwood Curling Club, Edmonton
British Columbia	Corryn Brown	Erin Pincott	Samantha Fisher	Sydney Fraser	Kamloops Curling Club, Kamloops
Manitoba	Shannon Birchard	Nicole Sigvaldason	Shenya Andreis	Mariah Mondor	St. Vital Curling Club, Winnipeg
New Brunswick	Jessica Daigle	Cathlia Ward	Natalie Menzies	Katie Forward	Capital Winter Club, Fredericton
Newfoundland and Labrador	Carolyn Suley	Amanda Rumboldt	Meryn Avery	Nicole Noseworthy	RE/MAX Centre, St. John's
Northern Ontario	Tirzah Keffer	Sheree Hinz	Megan Westlund	Rachel Camlin	Port Arthur Curling Club, Thunder Bay
Northwest Territories	Carina McKay-Saturnino	Karly King Simpson	Hilary Charlie	Rayna Vittrekwa	Inuvik Curling Club, Inuvik
Nova Scotia	Mary Myketyn-Driscoll	Taylor Clarke	MacKenzie Proctor	Sara Sears	Truro Curling Club, Truro
Nunavut	Sadie Pinksen	Christianne West	Katie Chislett-Manning	Emily Matthews	Iqaluit Curling Club, Iqaluit
Ontario	Jamie Sinclair	Holly Donaldson	Katelyn Wasyikiw	Erin Jenkins	Manotick Curling Center, Manotick
Prince Edward Island	Veronica Smith	Chloe McCloskey	Sabrina Smith	Katie Fullerton	Cornwall Curling Club, Cornwall
Quebec	Sarah Dumais	Myriam Arsenault	Joanie Mathieu	Nancy Rochon	Club de curling Etchemin, Saint-Romuald
Saskatchewan	Jessica Hanson	Kourtney Fesser	Teresa Waterfield	Krista Fesser	Granite Curling Club, Saskatoon
Yukon	Sarah Koltun	Chelsea Duncan	Patty Wallingham	Jenna Duncan	Whitehorse Curling Club, Whitehorse

== Round-robin standings ==
Final round-robin standings

Key
Teams to Championship Pool
Teams to Tiebreakers

Pool A	Skip	W	L
British Columbia	Corryn Brown	5	1
Yukon	Sarah Koltun	4	2
Alberta	Karynn Flory	3	3
New Brunswick	Jessica Daigle	3	3
Newfoundland and Labrador	Carolyn Suley	3	3
Saskatchewan	Jessica Hanson	3	3
Nunavut	Sadie Pinksen	0	6

Pool B	Skip	W	L
Manitoba	Shannon Birchard	6	0
Ontario	Jamie Sinclair	5	1
Nova Scotia	Mary Myketyn-Driscoll	3	3
Quebec	Sarah Dumais	2	4
Northwest Territories	Carina McKay-Saturnino	2	4
Northern Ontario	Tirzah Keffer	2	4
Prince Edward Island	Veronica Smith	1	5

== Round-robin results ==
All draw times are listed in Mountain Standard Time (UTC−7).

=== Pool A ===
==== Draw 1 ====
Saturday, February 2, 1:00 pm

Sheet B	1	2	3	4	5	6	7	8	9	10	Final
Saskatchewan (Hanson)	0	2	1	0	0	0	2	0	0	0	5
British Columbia (Brown) 🔨	1	0	0	1	2	0	0	2	0	1	7

Sheet D	1	2	3	4	5	6	7	8	9	10	Final
Nunavut (Pinksen) 🔨	1	0	0	0	1	0	0	1	X	X	3
Alberta (Flory)	0	4	2	1	0	6	4	0	X	X	17

Sheet F	1	2	3	4	5	6	7	8	9	10	Final
New Brunswick (Daigle)	1	0	1	0	0	0	2	0	1	0	5
Newfoundland and Labrador (Suley) 🔨	0	2	0	2	1	1	0	1	0	0	7

==== Draw 2 ====
Saturday, February 2, 6:30 pm

Sheet H	1	2	3	4	5	6	7	8	9	10	Final
Yukon (Koltun) 🔨	1	3	4	3	3	2	3	1	X	X	20
Nunavut (Pinksen)	0	0	0	0	0	0	0	0	X	X	0

Sheet J	1	2	3	4	5	6	7	8	9	10	Final
British Columbia (Brown) 🔨	1	0	0	1	0	1	1	1	0	1	6
New Brunswick (Daigle)	0	4	1	0	0	0	0	0	2	0	7

==== Draw 3 ====
Sunday, February 3, 1:00 pm

Sheet C	1	2	3	4	5	6	7	8	9	10	Final
Newfoundland and Labrador (Suley) 🔨	1	0	2	1	3	0	2	1	0	0	10
Nunavut (Pinksen)	0	1	0	0	0	1	0	0	1	0	3

Sheet E	1	2	3	4	5	6	7	8	9	10	Final
Yukon (Koltun) 🔨	1	0	0	3	0	1	1	0	0	1	7
British Columbia (Brown)	0	1	2	0	4	0	0	1	2	0	10

Sheet G	1	2	3	4	5	6	7	8	9	10	Final
Alberta (Flory) 🔨	0	1	0	1	2	0	1	1	0	1	7
Saskatchewan (Hanson)	1	0	1	0	0	1	0	0	2	0	5

==== Draw 4 ====
Sunday, February 3, 6:00 pm

Sheet C	1	2	3	4	5	6	7	8	9	10	Final
New Brunswick (Daigle) 🔨	0	1	0	0	1	0	1	0	2	0	5
Yukon (Koltun)	0	0	0	3	0	1	0	1	0	1	6

Sheet G	1	2	3	4	5	6	7	8	9	10	Final
British Columbia (Brown)	0	2	1	0	1	1	0	0	0	2	7
Newfoundland and Labrador (Suley) 🔨	1	0	0	1	0	0	3	0	0	0	5

Sheet I	1	2	3	4	5	6	7	8	9	10	Final
Nunavut (Pinksen)	0	0	0	0	0	1	0	0	X	X	1
Saskatchewan (Hanson) 🔨	3	3	3	4	1	0	5	2	X	X	21

==== Draw 6 ====
Monday, February 4, 2:00 pm

Sheet D	1	2	3	4	5	6	7	8	9	10	Final
Saskatchewan (Hanson)	0	0	0	4	0	3	0	3	X	X	10
Newfoundland and Labrador (Suley) 🔨	1	0	0	0	1	0	1	0	X	X	3

Sheet F	1	2	3	4	5	6	7	8	9	10	11	Final
Alberta (Flory)	0	1	0	0	2	0	1	0	2	1	0	7
Yukon (Koltun) 🔨	1	0	1	0	0	2	0	3	0	0	3	10

Sheet G	1	2	3	4	5	6	7	8	9	10	Final
Nunavut (Pinksen)	0	0	0	0	0	0	0	1	X	X	1
New Brunswick (Daigle) 🔨	6	3	2	5	2	1	2	0	X	X	21

==== Draw 7 ====
Monday, February 4, 7:00 pm

Sheet B	1	2	3	4	5	6	7	8	9	10	11	Final
Newfoundland and Labrador (Suley) 🔨	0	0	0	2	0	1	1	0	1	0	0	5
Yukon (Koltun)	0	0	0	0	2	0	0	1	0	2	2	7

Sheet C	1	2	3	4	5	6	7	8	9	10	Final
Alberta (Flory)	0	0	0	1	0	0	0	0	X	X	1
British Columbia (Brown) 🔨	0	2	0	0	3	1	1	1	X	X	8

Sheet E	1	2	3	4	5	6	7	8	9	10	Final
Saskatchewan (Hanson)	0	0	1	2	0	1	0	2	0	X	6
New Brunswick (Daigle) 🔨	0	1	0	0	2	0	4	0	2	X	9

==== Draw 8 ====
Tuesday, February 5, 1:00 pm

Sheet F	1	2	3	4	5	6	7	8	9	10	Final
British Columbia (Brown)	3	5	2	0	4	4	3	3	X	X	24
Nunavut (Pinksen) 🔨	0	0	0	1	0	0	0	0	X	X	1

Sheet I	1	2	3	4	5	6	7	8	9	10	Final
Newfoundland and Labrador (Suley)	1	2	0	1	0	0	2	0	3	X	9
Alberta (Flory) 🔨	0	0	1	0	3	0	0	1	0	X	5

==== Draw 9 ====
Tuesday, February 5, 6:00 pm

Sheet A	1	2	3	4	5	6	7	8	9	10	11	Final
Yukon (Koltun) 🔨	2	0	1	0	1	0	1	0	0	1	0	6
Saskatchewan (Hanson)	0	1	0	2	0	1	0	1	1	0	2	8

Sheet B	1	2	3	4	5	6	7	8	9	10	Final
New Brunswick (Daigle)	0	0	0	0	1	0	1	2	X	X	4
Alberta (Flory) 🔨	2	1	4	2	0	1	0	0	X	X	10

=== Pool B ===
==== Draw 1 ====
Saturday, February 2, 1:00 pm

Sheet H	1	2	3	4	5	6	7	8	9	10	Final
Northern Ontario (Keffer)	0	0	1	1	0	0	3	1	0	0	6
Manitoba (Birchard) 🔨	1	0	0	0	3	4	0	0	1	0	9

Sheet J	1	2	3	4	5	6	7	8	9	10	Final
Northwest Territories (McKay-Saturnino)	0	0	1	0	0	0	0	0	X	X	1
Ontario (Sinclair) 🔨	3	1	0	5	3	4	1	1	X	X	18

==== Draw 2 ====
Saturday, February 2, 6:30 pm

Sheet A	1	2	3	4	5	6	7	8	9	10	Final
Quebec (Dumais)	0	1	0	1	2	1	0	3	1	X	9
Northwest Territories (McKay-Saturnino) 🔨	1	0	1	0	0	0	1	0	0	X	3

Sheet C	1	2	3	4	5	6	7	8	9	10	Final
Manitoba (Birchard) 🔨	1	0	0	2	0	1	0	0	4	0	8
Prince Edward Island (Smith)	0	1	1	0	1	0	1	1	0	1	6

Sheet E	1	2	3	4	5	6	7	8	9	10	Final
Nova Scotia (Myketyn-Driscoll)	0	0	0	1	0	1	0	0	X	X	2
Ontario (Sinclair) 🔨	3	1	1	0	1	0	3	1	X	X	10

==== Draw 3 ====
Sunday, February 3, 1:00 pm

Sheet A	1	2	3	4	5	6	7	8	9	10	Final
Ontario (Sinclair) 🔨	0	4	0	0	1	1	0	1	0	2	9
Northern Ontario (Keffer)	1	0	1	3	0	0	1	0	1	0	7

Sheet I	1	2	3	4	5	6	7	8	9	10	Final
Nova Scotia (Myketyn-Driscoll)	1	0	0	0	0	2	0	0	X	X	3
Northwest Territories (McKay-Saturnino) 🔨	0	1	2	2	1	0	1	1	X	X	8

Sheet K	1	2	3	4	5	6	7	8	9	10	Final
Quebec (Dumais)	0	1	0	0	0	0	0	1	X	X	2
Manitoba (Birchard) 🔨	2	0	1	1	2	2	1	0	X	X	9

==== Draw 4 ====
Sunday, February 3, 6:00 pm

Sheet D	1	2	3	4	5	6	7	8	9	10	Final
Northwest Territories (McKay-Saturnino)	0	0	0	0	0	1	1	0	X	X	2
Northern Ontario (Keffer) 🔨	0	1	4	2	5	0	0	1	X	X	13

Sheet H	1	2	3	4	5	6	7	8	9	10	Final
Prince Edward Island (Smith) 🔨	0	0	1	1	1	0	0	0	2	1	6
Quebec (Dumais)	1	0	0	0	0	2	0	2	0	0	5

==== Draw 5 ====
Monday, February 4, 9:00 am

Sheet C	1	2	3	4	5	6	7	8	9	10	Final
Ontario (Sinclair)	0	0	0	1	0	0	1	1	X	X	3
Manitoba (Birchard) 🔨	1	0	2	0	2	3	0	0	X	X	8

Sheet E	1	2	3	4	5	6	7	8	9	10	Final
Northern Ontario (Keffer)	1	1	0	4	0	2	0	0	0	3	11
Prince Edward Island (Smith) 🔨	0	0	2	0	1	0	1	1	1	0	6

==== Draw 6 ====
Monday, February 4, 2:00 pm

Sheet C	1	2	3	4	5	6	7	8	9	10	Final
Nova Scotia (Myketyn-Driscoll) 🔨	0	0	4	0	1	0	1	3	1	X	10
Quebec (Dumais)	2	0	0	2	0	1	0	0	0	X	5

==== Draw 7 ====
Monday, February 4, 7:00 pm

Sheet G	1	2	3	4	5	6	7	8	9	10	11	Final
Ontario (Sinclair) 🔨	2	0	0	1	0	1	0	0	1	1	1	7
Quebec (Dumais)	0	1	1	0	2	0	1	1	0	0	0	6

Sheet J	1	2	3	4	5	6	7	8	9	10	Final
Northern Ontario (Keffer) 🔨	1	0	0	0	0	0	0	0	X	X	1
Nova Scotia (Myketyn-Driscoll)	0	0	3	2	3	1	1	1	X	X	11

Sheet K	1	2	3	4	5	6	7	8	9	10	Final
Northwest Territories (McKay-Saturnio) 🔨	0	1	1	1	0	0	3	0	1	0	7
Prince Edward Island (Smith)	1	0	0	0	2	1	0	1	0	1	6

==== Draw 8 ====
Tuesday, February 5, 1:00 pm

Sheet B	1	2	3	4	5	6	7	8	9	10	11	Final
Quebec (Dumais)	0	1	1	0	1	0	0	1	1	0	1	6
Northern Ontario (Keffer) 🔨	0	0	0	2	0	0	2	0	0	1	0	5

Sheet D	1	2	3	4	5	6	7	8	9	10	Final
Nova Scotia (Myketyn-Driscoll)	2	0	0	2	1	0	2	0	2	X	9
Prince Edward Island (Smith) 🔨	0	0	2	0	0	1	0	1	0	X	4

Sheet E	1	2	3	4	5	6	7	8	9	10	Final
Manitoba (Birchard) 🔨	2	0	4	0	1	0	1	0	X	X	8
Northwest Territories (McKay-Saturnino)	0	1	0	0	0	1	0	1	X	X	3

==== Draw 9 ====
Tuesday, February 5, 6:00 pm

Sheet G	1	2	3	4	5	6	7	8	9	10	Final
Manitoba (Birchard) 🔨	2	1	0	1	0	4	2	1	X	X	11
Nova Scotia (Myketyn-Driscoll)	0	0	1	0	1	0	0	0	X	X	2

Sheet I	1	2	3	4	5	6	7	8	9	10	Final
Prince Edward Island (Smith)	1	0	0	1	0	0	0	1	0	X	3
Ontario (Sinclair) 🔨	0	1	1	0	2	0	4	0	4	X	12

=== Round Robin Tiebreakers ===
Tuesday, February 5

Team	Final
Northern Ontario (Keffer)	5
Northwest Territories (McKay-Saturnino)	10

Wednesday, February 6, 8:00 am

Sheet A	Final
Quebec (Dumais)	10
Northwest Territories (McKay-Saturnino)	5

Sheet C	Final
Newfoundland and Labrador (Suley)	7
Saskatchewan (Hanson)	10

Sheet D	Final
Alberta (Flory)	3
New Brunswick (Daigle)	8

== Placement Round ==
=== Championship Pool ===
==== Standings ====
Final Standings

Key
Teams to Playoffs
Teams to Tiebreaker

Province	Skip	W	L
British Columbia	Corryn Brown	9	1
Manitoba	Shannon Birchard	9	1
Ontario	Jamie Sinclair	7	3
Yukon	Sarah Koltun	7	3
Saskatchewan	Jessica Hanson	5	5
New Brunswick	Jessica Daigle	4	6
Nova Scotia	Mary Myketyn-Driscoll	3	7
Quebec	Sarah Dumais	3	7

==== Results ====
===== Draw 1 =====
Wednesday, February 6, 1:00 pm

Sheet A	1	2	3	4	5	6	7	8	9	10	Final
Quebec (Dumais)	2	1	0	1	1	0	1	0	2	0	8
British Columbia (Brown) 🔨	0	0	2	0	0	1	0	3	0	4	10

Sheet C	1	2	3	4	5	6	7	8	9	10	Final
Yukon (Koltun)	0	3	1	1	0	1	0	0	1	0	7
Manitoba (Birchard) 🔨	2	0	0	0	1	0	3	1	0	1	8

Sheet E	1	2	3	4	5	6	7	8	9	10	Final
Ontario (Sinclair)	0	0	3	0	0	2	0	2	0	2	9
New Brunswick (Daigle) 🔨	0	1	0	1	2	0	3	0	1	0	8

Sheet G	1	2	3	4	5	6	7	8	9	10	Final
Saskatchewan (Hanson) 🔨	1	0	1	0	4	0	0	5	X	X	11
Nova Scotia (Myketyn-Driscoll)	0	1	0	1	0	0	1	0	X	X	3

===== Draw 2 =====
Wednesday, February 6, 6:00 pm

Sheet B	1	2	3	4	5	6	7	8	9	10	Final
Nova Scotia (Myketyn-Driscoll)	0	0	0	0	0	2	0	0	X	X	2
British Columbia (Brown) 🔨	0	1	0	2	0	0	2	3	X	X	8

Sheet D	1	2	3	4	5	6	7	8	9	10	Final
Quebec (Dumais)	1	0	0	0	0	0	1	0	X	X	2
Yukon (Koltun) 🔨	0	2	1	2	1	3	0	4	X	X	13

Sheet F	1	2	3	4	5	6	7	8	9	10	Final
Manitoba (Birchard)	2	0	2	0	2	0	1	0	1	0	8
New Brunswick (Daigle) 🔨	0	2	0	1	0	2	0	0	0	0	5

Sheet H	1	2	3	4	5	6	7	8	9	10	Final
Ontario (Sinclair)	0	1	2	0	0	2	0	2	0	1	8
Saskatchewan (Hanson) 🔨	1	0	0	1	2	0	2	0	1	0	7

===== Draw 3 =====
Thursday, February 7, 1:00 pm

Sheet B	1	2	3	4	5	6	7	8	9	10	Final
New Brunswick (Daigle)	0	1	1	0	2	0	0	0	0	X	4
Quebec (Dumais) 🔨	1	0	0	2	0	1	1	2	1	X	8

Sheet D	1	2	3	4	5	6	7	8	9	10	Final
British Columbia (Brown)	0	3	2	0	2	0	6	0	X	X	13
Manitoba (Birchard) 🔨	2	0	0	2	0	1	0	1	X	X	6

Sheet E	1	2	3	4	5	6	7	8	9	10	Final
Nova Scotia (Myketyn-Driscoll)	0	0	2	0	0	0	1	0	X	X	3
Yukon (Koltun) 🔨	3	1	0	1	3	1	0	1	X	X	10

===== Draw 4 =====
Thursday, February 7, 6:00 pm

Sheet C	1	2	3	4	5	6	7	8	9	10	Final
British Columbia (Brown)	0	1	0	0	4	1	0	2	0	3	11
Ontario (Sinclair) 🔨	1	0	2	1	0	0	3	0	3	0	10

Sheet E	1	2	3	4	5	6	7	8	9	10	Final
Manitoba (Birchard)	0	3	0	0	2	0	1	0	3	X	9
Saskatchewan (Hanson) 🔨	2	0	1	0	0	0	0	1	0	X	4

===== Draw 5 =====
Friday, February 8, 8:00 am

Sheet A	1	2	3	4	5	6	7	8	9	10	Final
New Brunswick (Daigle) 🔨	1	0	3	2	1	0	2	0	1	X	10
Nova Scotia (Myketyn-Driscoll)	0	2	0	0	0	2	0	2	0	X	6

Sheet B	1	2	3	4	5	6	7	8	9	10	Final
Yukon (Koltun) 🔨	3	1	0	3	1	1	0	1	X	X	10
Ontario (Sinclair)	0	0	2	0	0	0	1	0	X	X	3

Sheet C	1	2	3	4	5	6	7	8	9	10	Final
Saskatchewan (Hanson) 🔨	1	0	0	1	0	1	1	3	2	X	9
Quebec (Dumais)	0	0	2	0	1	0	0	0	0	X	3

==== Championship Pool Tiebreaker ====
Friday, February 8, 1:00 pm

Sheet B	1	2	3	4	5	6	7	8	9	10	Final
Yukon (Koltun) 🔨	1	0	0	1	1	0	0	2	0	0	5
Ontario (Sinclair)	0	1	1	0	0	1	2	0	0	1	6

Player percentages
Yukon		Ontario	
Jenna Duncan	78%	Erin Jenkins	73%
Patty Wallingham	76%	Katelyn Wasylkiw	61%
Chelsea Duncan	85%	Holly Donaldson	76%
Sarah Koltun	65%	Jamie Sinclair	79%
Total	76%	Total	72%

=== Seeding Pool ===
==== Standings ====
Province	Skip	W	L
Newfoundland and Labrador	Carolyn Suley	6	3
Alberta	Karynn Flory	5	4
Northern Ontario	Tirzah Keffer	3	6
Northwest Territories	Carina McKay-Saturnino	3	6
Prince Edward Island	Veronica Smith	3	6
Nunavut	Sadie Pinksen	0	9

==== Results ====
===== Draw 1 =====
Wednesday, February 6, 1:00 pm

Sheet J	1	2	3	4	5	6	7	8	9	10	Final
Newfoundland and Labrador (Suley) 🔨	0	0	0	3	0	1	0	1	0	2	7
Prince Edward Island (Smith)	0	1	1	0	2	0	0	0	2	0	6

===== Draw 2 =====
Wednesday, February 6, 6:00 pm

Sheet I	1	2	3	4	5	6	7	8	9	10	Final
Northwest Territories (McKay-Saturnino)	0	2	0	1	0	0	0	0	X	X	3
Alberta (Flory) 🔨	2	0	2	0	3	3	1	1	X	X	12

Sheet J	1	2	3	4	5	6	7	8	9	10	Final
Northern Ontario (Keffer) 🔨	1	5	1	0	3	5	1	1	X	X	17
Nunavut (Pinksen)	0	0	0	1	0	0	0	0	X	X	1

===== Draw 3 =====
Thursday, February 7, 1:00 pm

Sheet H	1	2	3	4	5	6	7	8	9	10	Final
Nunavut (Pinksen)	0	1	0	2	0	0	0	0	X	X	3
Northwest Territories (McKay-Saturnino) 🔨	2	0	1	0	1	4	2	2	X	X	12

===== Draw 4 =====
Thursday, February 7, 6:00 pm

Sheet F	1	2	3	4	5	6	7	8	9	10	11	Final
Newfoundland and Labrador (Suley) 🔨	1	0	0	3	0	0	2	0	0	0	3	9
Northern Ontario (Keffer)	0	1	0	0	1	0	0	2	1	1	0	6

Sheet G	1	2	3	4	5	6	7	8	9	10	11	Final
Prince Edward Island (Smith) 🔨	0	0	1	0	2	0	0	1	1	1	1	7
Alberta (Flory)	0	0	0	3	0	3	0	0	0	0	0	6

===== Draw 6 =====
Friday, February 8, 1:00 pm

Sheet A	1	2	3	4	5	6	7	8	9	10	Final
Northern Ontario (Keffer)	0	0	2	1	0	0	1	0	1	0	5
Alberta (Flory) 🔨	0	1	0	0	3	1	0	1	0	1	7

Sheet B	1	2	3	4	5	6	7	8	9	10	Final
Nunavut (Pinksen) 🔨	1	1	0	1	0	0	0	0	X	X	3
Prince Edward Island (Smith)	0	0	4	0	1	1	1	4	X	X	11

Sheet E	1	2	3	4	5	6	7	8	9	10	Final
Newfoundland and Labrador (Suley) 🔨	1	0	1	2	0	1	0	0	1	2	8
Northwest Territories (McKay-Saturnino)	0	1	0	0	2	0	0	1	0	0	4

== Playoffs ==
Semifinal			Final
			1	British Columbia	6
2	Manitoba	10	2	Manitoba	3
3	Ontario	6

=== Semifinal ===
Sunday, February 10, 10:30 am

Sheet B	1	2	3	4	5	6	7	8	9	10	11	Final
Manitoba (Birchard) 🔨	0	0	1	0	4	0	0	1	0	0	4	10
Ontario (Sinclair)	1	0	0	1	0	1	1	0	1	1	0	6

Player percentages
Manitoba		Ontario	
Mariah Mondor	86%	Erin Jenkins	91%
Shenya Andreis	86%	Katelyn Wasyikiw	81%
Nicole Sigvaldason	81%	Holly Donaldson	82%
Shannon Birchard	73%	Jamie Sinclair	69%
Total	82%	Total	81%

=== Final ===
Sunday, February 10, 5:00 pm

Sheet B	1	2	3	4	5	6	7	8	9	10	Final
British Columbia (Brown) 🔨	0	0	0	1	0	0	3	0	1	1	6
Manitoba (Birchard)	0	0	0	0	0	2	0	1	0	0	3

Player percentages
British Columbia		Manitoba	
Sydney Fraser	81%	Mariah Mondor	71%
Samantha Fisher	76%	Shenya Andries	78%
Erin Pincott	71%	Nicole Sigvaldason	71%
Corryn Brown	79%	Shannon Birchard	78%
Total	77%	Total	72%

== Awards ==
The all-star teams and award winners are as follows:

=== All-Star teams ===
First Team

- Skip: Corryn Brown, British Columbia
- Third: Chelsea Duncan, Yukon
- Second: Sheyna Andries, Manitoba
- Lead: Katie Roskewich, Alberta

Second Team

- Skip: Sarah Koltun, Yukon
- Third: Holly Donaldson, Ontario
- Second: Megan Westlund, Northern Ontario
- Lead: Katie Fullerton, Prince Edward Island

=== Ken Watson Sportsmanship Awards ===
- Sheree Hinz, Northern Ontario third

=== Fair Play Awards ===
- Lead: Sydney Fraser, British Columbia
- Second: Teresa Waterfield, Saskatchewan
- Third: Sheree Hinz, Northern Ontario
- Skip: Sadie Pinksen, Nunavut
- Coach: Lynn Kreviazuk, Nunavut

=== ASHAM National Coaching Awards ===
- Tim Warkentin, Northern Ontario

=== Joan Mead Legacy Awards ===
- Tirzah Keffer, Northern Ontario skip
