= Jamie Sinclair =

Canadian-American curler (born 1992)

- Curler
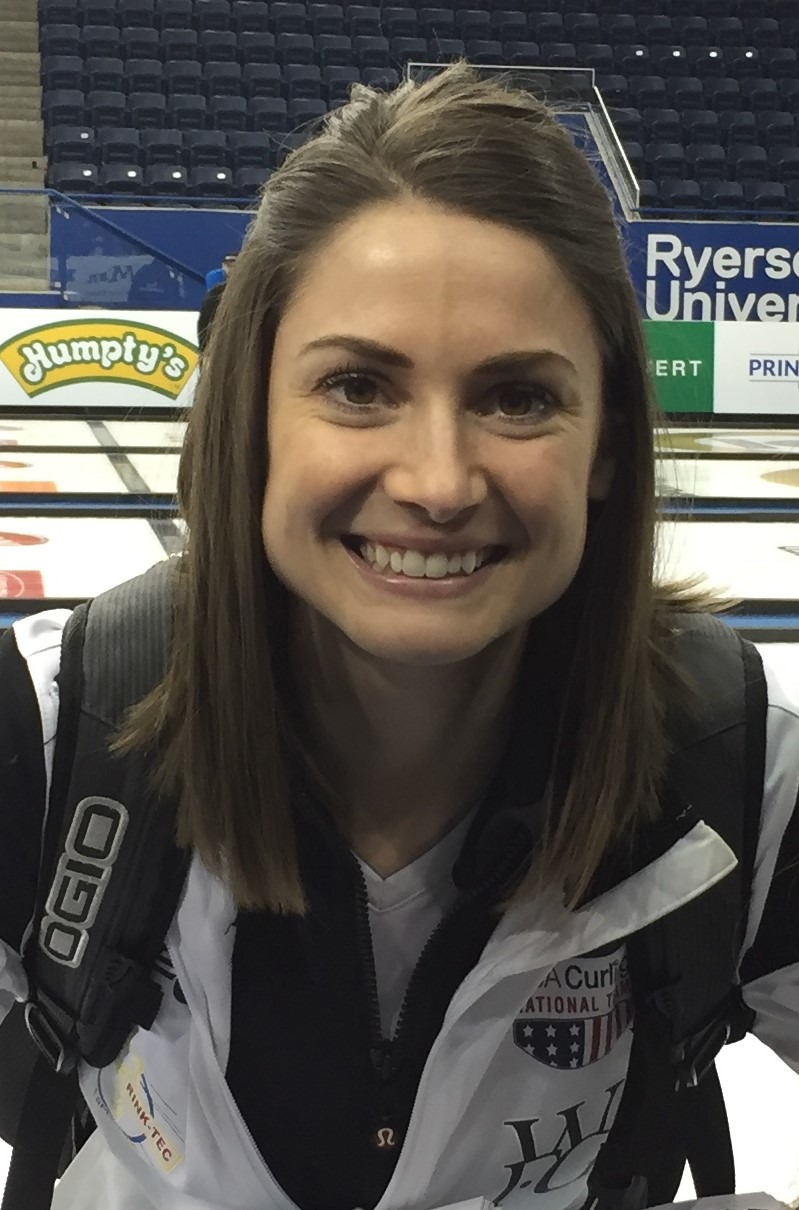
- Sinclair at the 2018 Players' Championship
- Born: February 21, 1992 (age 34); Anchorage, Alaska, U.S.

Team
- Curling club: Manotick CC, Manotick and Charlotte Curling Association, Charlotte, North Carolina

Curling career
- Member Association: Ontario (2006–2014); Minnesota (2014–2019) (United States) Grand National (2019–2022); Ineligible (2022–2023); Quebec (2023–2025)
- Hearts: 2 (2024, 2025)
- World Championship: 2 (2018, 2019)
- Top CTRS ranking: 12th (2024–25)
- Grand Slam victories: 1 (2018 Players' Championship)
Medal record
Women's curling
Representing Minnesota
United States National Championships
Gold medal – first place	2017 Everett
Gold medal – first place	2018 Fargo
Gold medal – first place	2019 Kalamazoo
United States Olympic Curling Trials
Silver medal – second place	2017 Omaha
Representing North Carolina
United States Olympic Curling Trials
Bronze medal – third place	2021 Omaha
United States National Championships
Silver medal – second place	2020 Cheney
Silver medal – second place	2021 Wausau
Representing Ontario
Canada Winter Games
Gold medal – first place	2007 Whitehorse

Jamie Ann Sinclair (born February 21, 1992) is an American-Canadian curler from Osgoode, Ontario and is a three-time U.S. National Champion. Her United States Curling Association membership is through the Charlotte Curling Association in Charlotte, North Carolina where she has a number of personal connections. She grew up in Manotick, Ontario, a suburb of Ottawa.

== Curling career ==
=== 2007–2013: Juniors ===
Sinclair won a gold medal at the 2007 Canada Winter Games, playing lead for the Rachel Homan rink. She was a member of the Homan rink that won the 2006 Bantam provincial championship. She won the Bantam provincial championship again in 2009 as a skip.

Sinclair played in her first World Curling Tour (WCT) event, at the 2011 Challenge Casino Lac Leamy. Her rink finished with a 1–2 record in her pool, and did not make the playoffs.

Sinclair and her rink of Holly Donaldson, Chantal Allan and Casandra Raganold won the provincial women's junior championship in 2012, defeating Lauren Horton 9–3. This earned her rink the right to represent Ontario at the 2012 Canadian Junior Curling Championships where they finished with a 7–5 record, just missing the playoffs in fourth place.

Sinclair won her second straight provincial junior title in 2013, with a new front end of Katelyn Wasylkiw and Erin Jenkins with Donaldson still at third. At the 2013 Canadian Junior Curling Championships, her team did make the playoffs, but lost in the semi-final to Manitoba's Shannon Birchard, settling for third place.

=== 2013–2016: Moving to the United States ===
For the 2013–14 season, Sinclair played on WCT teams on both sides of the border, playing third for the Ottawa-based Brit O'Neill rink, and third for the St. Paul, Minnesota-based Alexandra Carlson rink. With the Carlson rink, Sinclair played in the 2014 United States Women's Curling Championship, finishing with a 6–3 round robin record, but losing in a tie-breaker match. At the end of the season, Sinclair won the 2014 CIS/CCA Curling Championships, Canada's national university championship for Carleton University.

In 2014, Sinclair fully committed to playing out of the United States, and moved to Minnesota. For the 2014–15 season, she played third for the Nina Roth rink, which also consisted of Becca Hamilton and Tabitha Peterson. The team missed the playoffs at the 2015 United States Women's Curling Championship. The team played in two Grand Slam events, missing the playoffs at both the 2014 Colonial Square Ladies Classic and the 2014 Canadian Open of Curling.

In 2015, Roth left the team, with Sinclair assuming skipping duties, Hamilton throwing third rocks, Tabitha Peterson staying at lead and Tara Peterson joining the team at second. In their first season together, the team finished 4th at the 2016 United States Women's Curling Championship. The team played in one Slam, the 2015 National, going winless.

=== 2016–2020: Success at Nationals ===
In 2016, Sinclair formed a new team with Alexandra Carlson, Vicky Persinger and Monica Walker. Sinclair found much more success with her new team, winning the 2017 U.S. Championships, but missed out on going to the World Championship due to Nina Roth earning more points throughout the season. They also played for the winning North American Team at the 2017 Continental Cup of Curling and made it to the quarterfinals of the last Grand Slam of the season, the 2017 Humpty's Champions Cup.

The team started the 2017–18 season by winning the AMJ Campbell Shorty Jenkins Classic. At the 2017 United States Olympic Curling Trials, they missed their chance to play in the 2018 Winter Olympics when they lost a close three game final series to Nina Roth's team. Later that season they defended their national title, winning the 2018 United States Women's Curling Championship. Representing the United States at the 2018 World Women's Championship, they finished fourth, losing the bronze medal game to Russia's Victoria Moiseeva. Team Sinclair made history at the 2018 Players' Championship when they became the first American team to win a Grand Slam event. They finished the season with another quarterfinal finish at the 2018 Humpty's Champions Cup.

The United States Curling Association would change the high performance teams the following season for the next Olympic quadrennial. Sinclair would continue skipping with twin sisters Sarah and Taylor Anderson playing third and second respectively and Monica Walker would continue to play lead. The team did not have a very successful season up until the 2019 United States Women's Curling Championship where they defeated the Roth rink in final. At the 2019 World Women's Curling Championship, the team went 6–6 finishing in seventh place, just missing the playoffs.

The following season, Walker announced she would be retiring from competitive curling. The team brought on Cory Christensen to play third with Sinclair's former teammate Vicky Persinger coming on to play second. The Anderson twins would play lead and alternate. Retired Canadian curler Cathy Overton-Clapham joined the High Performance Program as Team Sinclair's coach for the 2019–20 season. They would win the Red Deer Curling Classic World Curling Tour event.

At the 2020 United States Women's Championship Team Sinclair only lost one game in the round robin, earning the number one seed in the playoffs. In the 1 vs. 2 page playoff Sinclair lost to Tabitha Peterson's team, who they faced again in the final after defeating Ariel Traxler's junior team in the semifinals. Peterson defeated Team Sinclair a second time in the final, with a final score of 7–5, stopping Sinclair from tying Debbie McCormick's record of four National Titles in a row.

=== 2020–2022: New lineup and doubles success ===
In March 2020, after an early end to the curling season due to the COVID-19 pandemic, Sinclair announced via twitter that her teammates had decided to part ways with her. Later in the off-season it was announced that Sinclair had formed a new team, bringing Walker out of her short retirement to play at third, and adding two younger curlers for the front end, Cora Farrell and Elizabeth Cousins. The team was not able to compete in any tour events due to the pandemic, but they were able to play in the 2021 United States Women's Curling Championship, held May 26–30 in Wausau, Wisconsin. There, they topped the round robin with an undefeated 6–0 record, which qualified them directly to the championship final where they faced Team Cory Christensen, Sinclair's former teammates. After trailing early, Team Sinclair tied the game in the eighth end, but couldn't hold on for the win as Christensen scored two points in the extra end to win 8–6.

The following season, Team Sinclair began by winning the 2021 Oakville Fall Classic, defeating Suzanne Birt 8–6 in the final game. Later in the season, they won another tour event at the Atkins Curling Supplies Classic with a 10–4 win over Kristy Watling in the championship final. They reached the final of the US Open of Curling, losing to the Tabitha Peterson rink 8–5 in the final. They also had a semifinal finish at the 2021 Curlers Corner Autumn Gold Curling Classic and a quarterfinal finish at the 2021 Oakville Labour Day Classic. Team Sinclair then played in the 2021 United States Olympic Curling Trials, held November 12 to 21 at the Baxter Arena in Omaha, Nebraska. Despite entering the Trials as the second ranked team, the team did not have a good performance, failing to reach the playoff round with a 4–6 record, finishing third. Team Sinclair ended the 2021–22 season with a semifinal loss at the Curl Mesabi Classic. They disbanded following the season.

Aside from her women's team, Sinclair had a successful mixed doubles 2021–22 season with partner Rich Ruohonen. The pair qualified for the 2021 United States mixed doubles curling Olympic trials and finished the round robin with a 5–4 record. They then beat John Shuster and Cory Christensen in a tiebreaker before winning both the 3 vs. 4 and semifinal games to qualify for the final. There, they played Sinclair's former teammate Vicky Persinger and Chris Plys. Tied in the eighth end, Persinger scored one for her team to end Sinclair's chances of reaching the 2022 Winter Olympics. The team also played in the 2022 United States Mixed Doubles Curling Championship later in the season where they lost in the semifinal to Sinclair's teammate Monica Walker and Andrew Stopera, earning the bronze medal.

=== 2022–present: Return to Canada ===
Sinclair moved back to Manotick, Ontario in 2022, having missed her family during the COVID-19 pandemic. On August 12, 2022, the new Manitoba based Chelsea Carey team announced that Sinclair would be joining them as their alternate for the 2022–23 season. The team also included Jolene Campbell at third, Liz Fyfe at second and Rachel Erickson at lead.

In 2023, it was announced that Sinclair would be joining team Laurie St-Georges as her third. Due to recent participation in the US playdown process, it was originally announced that she would not be eligible to play in the Scotties Tournament of Hearts (Canadian Nationals) until the 2024–25 season. However, Curling Canada updated the eligibility requirements to match that of World Curling, allowing her to compete for Team St-Georges at the 2024 Quebec Scotties Tournament of Hearts. Sinclair's residence in Ottawa was close enough to Quebec to allow her to compete for the province without being counted as an import player under Curling Canada's residency rules. The team won the Quebec Hearts, qualifying them for the 2024 Scotties Tournament of Hearts national championship, the first in Sinclair's career.

== Personal life ==
Sinclair was born in Anchorage, Alaska, where her Canadian father was on military exchange. The family moved back to Canada when she was 2, settling in Northern Quebec before moving to Ontario.

In October 2016 it was announced that she would appear as "Miss July" in the 2017 Women of Curling calendar.

Sinclair was born with a hearing disability. She graduated from Carleton University with an honours degree in international business and did a year of study abroad in Chile.

Sinclair currently works as a design and renovation contractor.

== Teams ==
Season	Skip	Third	Second	Lead	Alternate	Coach	Events
2005–06	Rachel Homan	Emma Miskew	Lynn Kreviazuk	Jamie Sinclair		Earle Morris	
2006–07	Rachel Homan	Emma Miskew	Lynn Kreviazuk	Jamie Sinclair		Earle Morris	2007 Canada Games (gold)
2008–09	Jamie Sinclair	Cheryl Kreviazuk	Melissa Gannon	Rebecca Wichers-Schreur			
2009–10	Jamie Sinclair	Cheryl Kreviazuk	Melissa Gannon	Rebecca Wichers-Schreur			
2010–11	Jamie Sinclair	Sara Westman	Rachelle Strybosch	Tess Bobbie			
2011–12	Jamie Sinclair	Holly Donaldson	Chantal Allan	Casandra Raganold			2012 CJCC (4th)
2012–13	Jamie Sinclair	Holly Donaldson	Katelyn Wasylkiw	Erin Jenkins			2013 CJCC (bronze)
2013–14	Brit O'Neill	Jamie Sinclair	Kim Brown	Trish Scharf			
2013–14	Alex Carlson	Jamie Sinclair	Emilia Juocys	Sherri Schummer			2014 USWCC (5th)
2013–14	Jamie Sinclair	Lauren Horton	Lynn Kreviazuk	Jessica Armstrong	Sarah Armstrong	Doug Kreviazuk	2014 CIS/CCA Cham. (gold)
2014–15	Nina Roth	Jamie Sinclair	Becca Hamilton	Tabitha Peterson			2015 USWCC (5th)
2015–16	Jamie Sinclair	Tabitha Peterson	Becca Hamilton	Jenna Haag	Tara Peterson		2016 USWCC (4th)
2016–17	Jamie Sinclair	Alex Carlson	Vicky Persinger	Monica Walker			2017 USOCT (silver); 2017 USWCC (gold)
2017–18	Jamie Sinclair	Alex Carlson	Vicky Persinger	Monica Walker	Jenna Martin (WWCC)	Scott Baird	2018 USWCC (gold); 2018 WWCC (4th)
2018–19	Jamie Sinclair	Sarah Anderson	Taylor Anderson	Monica Walker	Vicky Persinger (WWCC)	Bryan Cochrane	2019 USWCC (gold); 2019 WWCC (7th)
2019–20	Jamie Sinclair	Cory Christensen	Vicky Persinger	Taylor Anderson	Sarah Anderson	Cathy Overton-Clapham	2020 USWCC (silver)
2020–21	Jamie Sinclair	Monica Walker	Cora Farrell	Elizabeth Cousins		Mark Lazar	2021 USWCC (silver)
2021–22	Jamie Sinclair	Monica Walker	Cora Farrell	Elizabeth Cousins			2021 USOCT (bronze)
2022–23	Chelsea Carey	Jolene Campbell	Liz Fyfe	Rachel Erickson	Jamie Sinclair		
2023–24	Laurie St-Georges	Jamie Sinclair	Emily Riley	Kelly Middaugh	Marie-France Larouche		2024 STOH (11th)
2024–25	Laurie St-Georges	Jamie Sinclair	Emily Riley	Lisa Weagle			2025 STOH

== Grand Slam record ==
When Sinclair won the 2018 Players' Championship, she became the first ever American skip to win a Grand Slam tournament.

Key
C	Champion
F	Lost in Final
SF	Lost in Semifinal
QF	Lost in Quarterfinals
R16	Lost in the round of 16
Q	Did not advance to playoffs
T2	Played in Tier 2 event
DNP	Did not participate in event
N/A	Not a Grand Slam event that season

Event	2014–15	2015–16	2016–17	2017–18	2018–19	2019–20	2020–21	2021–22	2022–23
The National	N/A	Q	DNP	DNP	Q	DNP	N/A	DNP	Q
Tour Challenge	N/A	T2	DNP	T2	Q	DNP	N/A	N/A	Q
Masters	DNP	DNP	DNP	QF	Q	DNP	N/A	DNP	QF
Canadian Open	Q	DNP	DNP	Q	DNP	DNP	N/A	N/A	DNP
Players'	DNP	DNP	DNP	C	DNP	N/A	DNP	DNP	Q (Note: Sinclair spared for Jessie Haughian on Team Scheidegger.)
Champions Cup	N/A	DNP	QF	QF	Q	N/A	DNP	DNP	DNP

=== Former events ===
Event	2014–15	2015–16	2016–17	2017–18	2018–19
Elite 10	N/A	N/A	N/A	N/A	Q
Colonial Square Ladies Classic	Q	N/A	N/A	N/A	N/A
