= Cora Farrell =

American curler (born 1999)

- Curler
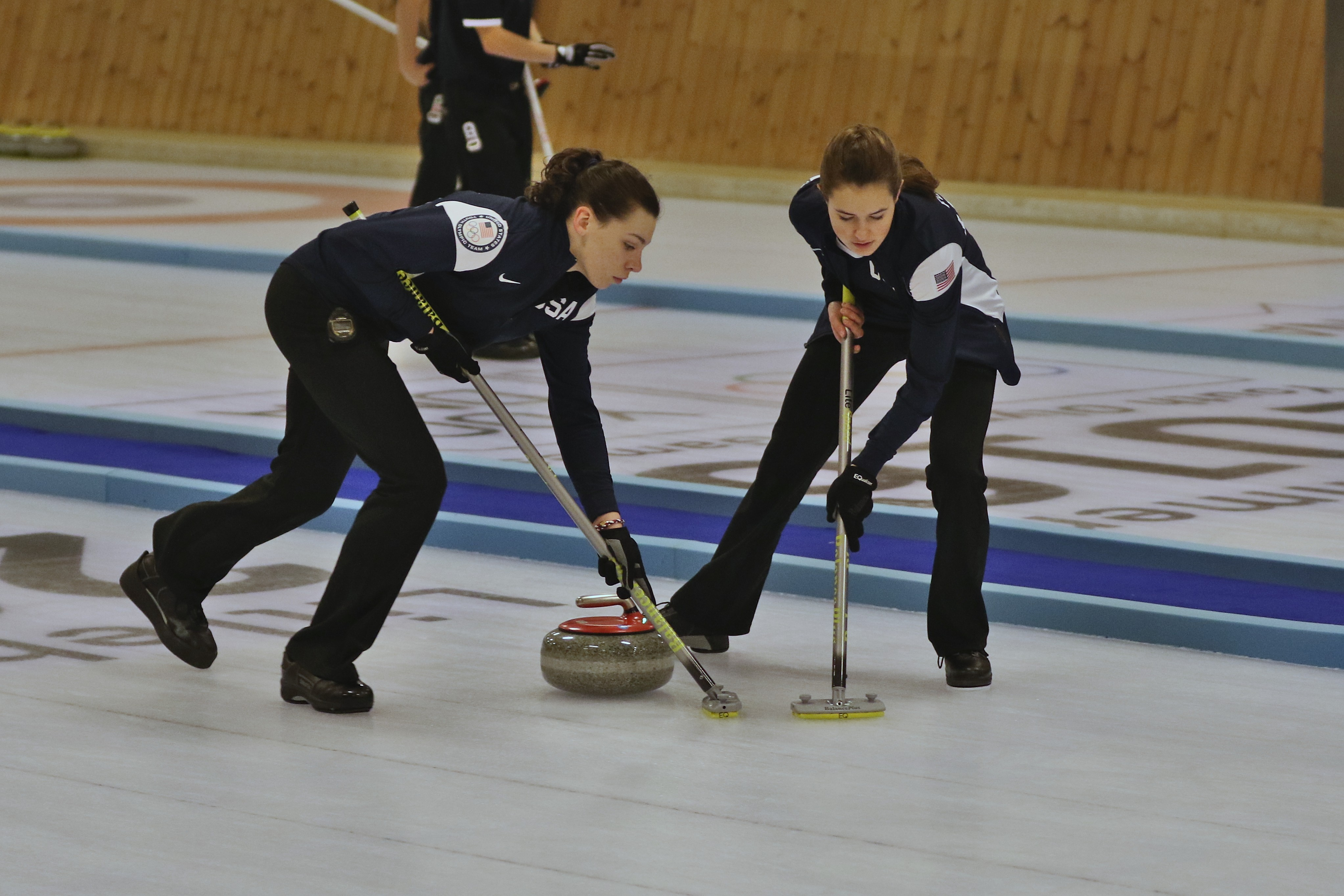
- Cora Farrell (left)
- Born: May 23, 1999 (age 27); Glen Ridge, New Jersey, U.S.

Team
- Curling club: Chaska CC, Chaska, MN
- Skip: Christine McMakin
- Third: Cora Farrell
- Second: Jenna Burchesky
- Lead: Clare Moores
- Mixed doubles partner: Coleman Thurston

Curling career
- Member Association: United States
Medal record
Curling
Representing Alaska
Arctic Winter Games
Bronze medal – third place	2014 Fairbanks
Representing United States
Winter Youth Olympics
Silver medal – second place	2016 Lillehammer
United States National Championships
Silver medal – second place	2021 Wausau
Bronze medal – third place	2018 Fargo

Cora Farrell (born May 23, 1999) is an American curler from Fairbanks, Alaska. She was a silver medalist at the 2016 Winter Youth Olympics in Lillehammer, Norway.

== Career ==
Farrell has competed in eight consecutive Junior National Championships. Her first was in 2013 at only 13 years old, playing third for Kaitlin Fowler. They finished the tournament with a 3–6 win–loss record, in a four-way tie for sixth place. Farrell's best results at Junior Nationals have been in 2017, 2019, and 2020, each time earning the silver medal.

In 2016 Farrell represented the United States at the 2016 Winter Youth Olympics, playing third on the mixed team skipped by Luc Violette. They earned the silver medal, losing to Canada's Mary Fay in the final. Later in the season, Farrell skipped her own team to victory at the Pacific International Cup, an international bonspiel held annually in Richmond, British Columbia.

At the 2018 United States Women's National Championship Farrell and her team, who had finished fourth at Junior Nationals earlier in the year, earned the bronze medal.

Farrell returned to the international stage in 2019, as skip of Team United States at the World Junior-B Championships in Lohja, Finland. The Junior-B Championships act as a qualifying tournament for the World Junior Curling Championships. They finished in fifth place, failing to qualify the United States for the 2020 World Juniors.

During the 2020 off-season it was announced that Farrell would be joining Jamie Sinclair, Monica Walker, and Elizabeth Cousins to form a new team for the 2020–21 season. The team was not able to compete in any tour events due to the COVID-19 pandemic, but they were able to play in the 2021 United States Women's Curling Championship, held May 26–30 in Wausau, Wisconsin. There, they topped the round robin with an undefeated 6–0 record, which qualified them directly to the championship final where they faced Team Cory Christensen. After trailing early, Team Sinclair tied the game in the eighth end, but couldn't hold on for the win as Christensen scored two points in the extra end to win 8–6.

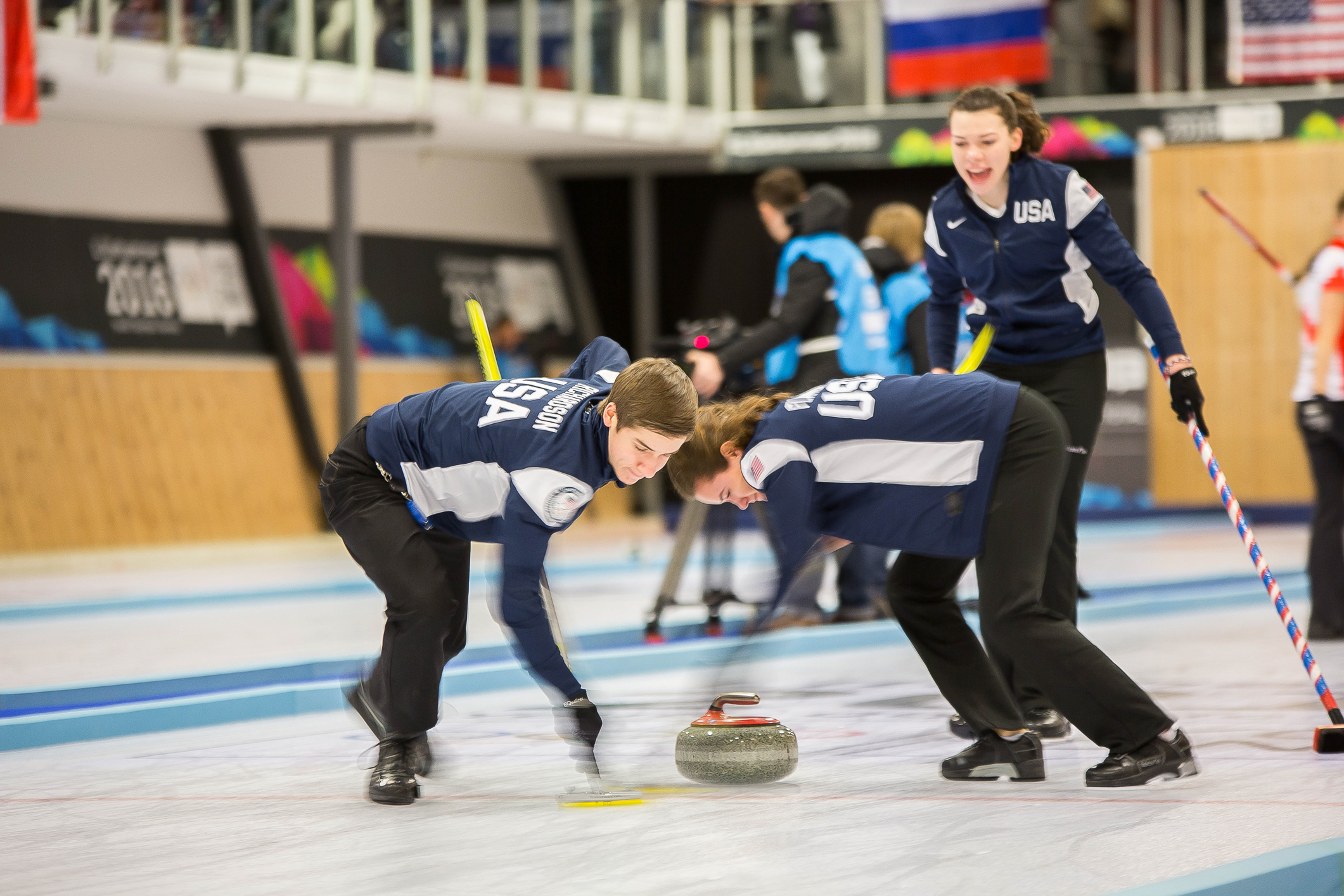
Ben Richardson, Cait Flannery and Cora Farrell at the 2016 Winter Youth Olympics

The following season, Team Sinclair began by winning the 2021 Oakville Fall Classic, defeating Suzanne Birt 8–6 in the final game. Later in the season, they won another tour event at the Atkins Curling Supplies Classic with a 10–4 win over Kristy Watling in the championship final. They reached the final of the US Open of Curling, losing to the Tabitha Peterson rink 8–5 in the final. They also had a semifinal finish at the 2021 Curlers Corner Autumn Gold Curling Classic and a quarterfinal finish at the 2021 Oakville Labour Day Classic. Team Sinclair then played in the 2021 United States Olympic Curling Trials, held November 12 to 21 at the Baxter Arena in Omaha, Nebraska. Despite entering the Trials as the second ranked team, the team did not have a good performance, failing to reach the playoff round with a 4–6 record, finishing third. Team Sinclair ended the 2021–22 season with a semifinal loss at the Curl Mesabi Classic. They disbanded following the season.

== Teams ==
Season	Skip	Third	Second	Lead	Alternate	Coach	Events
2012–13	Kaitlin Fowler	Cora Farrell	Naimy Schommer	Ariel Traxler			2013 USJCC (6th)
2013–14	Kaitlin Fowler	Cora Farrell	Naimy Schommer	Ariel Traxler			2014 USJCC (8th)
2014–15	Cora Farrell	Ariel Traxler	Naimy Schommer	Piper Brase			2015 USJCC (7th)
2015–16	Cora Farrell	Ariel Traxler	Naimy Schommer	Anne O'Hara			2016 USJCC (5th)
2015–16	Luc Violette	Cora Farrell	Ben Richardson	Cait Flannery		Tom Violette	2016 WYOG (silver)
2016–17	Madison Bear	Cora Farrell	Cait Flannery	Lexi Lanigan			2017 USJCC (silver)
2016–17	Cora Farrell	Cait Flannery	Lexi Lanigan	Rebecca Miles			2017 USWCC (4th)
2017–18	Cora Farrell	Cait Flannery	Lexi Lanigan	Rebecca Miles			2018 USJCC (4th); 2018 USWCC (bronze)
2018–19	Annmarie Dubberstein	Cora Farrell	Jenna Burchesky	Allison Howell			2019 USJCC (silver); 2019 USWCC (5th)
2019–20	Cait Flannery (fourth)	Leah Yavarow	Cora Farrell (skip)	Allison Howell	Rebecca Miles	Mark Lazar	2019 WJBCC (5th); 2020 USJCC (silver)
2020–21	Jamie Sinclair	Monica Walker	Cora Farrell	Elizabeth Cousins		Mark Lazar	2021 USWCC (silver)
2021–22	Jamie Sinclair	Monica Walker	Cora Farrell	Elizabeth Cousins			2021 USOCT (bronze)
2022–23	Christine McMakin	Cora Farrell	Jenna Burchesky	Clare Moores			
