= 2021 United States Women's Curling Championship =

- Host city: Wausau, Wisconsin
- Arena: Wausau Curling Club
- Dates: May 26–30
- Winner: (Minnesota) Team Christensen
- Skip: Cory Christensen
- Third: Sarah Anderson
- Second: Vicky Persinger
- Lead: Taylor Anderson
- Coach: Cathy Overton-Clapham
- Finalist: (North Carolina) Jamie Sinclair

The 2021 United States Women's Curling Championship was held from May 26 to 30, 2021 at the Wausau Curling Club in Wausau, Wisconsin. The event was held in conjunction with the 2021 United States Men's Curling Championship.

== Impact of the COVID-19 pandemic ==
The event was originally scheduled to be held February 6 to 13 at the ImOn Ice Arena in Cedar Rapids, Iowa. In August 2020, a derecho damaged the arena and the COVID-19 pandemic caused the repairs to be delayed significantly enough to necessitate moving the championships to a different venue. In December 2020 the United States Curling Association (USCA) announced that, due to the continuing pandemic, the Men's, Women's, and Mixed Doubles National Championships would be postponed until May 2021 and would be conducted in a bio-secure bubble. Typically, the winner of the National Women's Championship would represent the United States at the World Championship, but this postponement moved the national championship after the 2021 World Women's Championship and so the USCA offered the spot at World's to the 2020 champion, Team Peterson. The site of the bubble for the championships was later announced to be Wausau Curling Club in Wausau, Wisconsin.

== Qualification ==
Due to the pandemic, no qualification events were held and the qualification methods were modified. The top eight women's teams, determined by the World Curling Federation's World Team Ranking System, were invited to compete. Seven of the eight teams accepted the invitation. Typically, the qualification methods would be the top four teams from the World Team Ranking System, the top three teams from a qualification event, and one team from the Junior Championship.

== Teams ==
The seven teams competing in the 2021 championship are:

| Skip | Third | Second | Lead | Alternate | Coach | Locale |
|---|---|---|---|---|---|---|
| Madison Bear | Annmarie Dubberstein | Taylor Drees | Allison Howell | | Amy Harnden | Chaska, Minnesota |
| Cory Christensen | Sarah Anderson | Vicky Persinger | Taylor Anderson | | Cathy Overton-Clapham | Chaska, Minnesota |
| Christine McMakin | Jackie Lemke | Jenna Burchesky | Maya Willertz | Nicole Prohaska | Sandra McMakin | Fargo, North Dakota |
| Kim Rhyme | Elizabeth Brundage | Cait Flannery | Katie Rhyme | | Bill Rhyme | Minneapolis, Minnesota |
| Jamie Sinclair | Monica Walker | Cora Farrell | Elizabeth Cousins | | Mark Lazar | Charlotte, North Carolina |
| Delaney Strouse | Sydney Mullaney | Rebecca Rodgers | Leah Yavarow | Susan Dudt | Courtney George | (Minnesota) Midland, Michigan |
| Ariel Traxler | Anne O'Hara | Sara Olson | Elizabeth Janiak | Katherine Gourianova | Leland Rich | Fairbanks, Alaska |

== Round-robin standings ==
Final round-robin standings

Key
| Teams to playoffs |

| Skip | W | L |
|---|---|---|
| (North Carolina) Jamie Sinclair | 6 | 0 |
| (Minnesota) Cory Christensen | 5 | 1 |
| (Minnesota) Madison Bear | 3 | 3 |
| (North Dakota) Christine McMakin | 2 | 4 |
| (Minnesota) Delaney Strouse | 2 | 4 |
| (Minnesota) Kim Rhyme | 2 | 4 |
| (Alaska) Ariel Traxler | 1 | 5 |

== Round-robin results ==
All draw times are listed in Central Daylight Time (UTC−05:00).

=== Draw 1 ===
Wednesday, May 26, 8:00 am

| Sheet 2 | 1 | 2 | 3 | 4 | 5 | 6 | 7 | 8 | 9 | 10 | Final |
|---|---|---|---|---|---|---|---|---|---|---|---|
| (Alaska) Ariel Traxler 🔨 | 0 | 0 | 0 | 2 | 0 | 0 | 1 | 0 | X | X | 3 |
| (Minnesota) Kim Rhyme | 2 | 0 | 1 | 0 | 2 | 2 | 0 | 3 | X | X | 10 |

| Sheet 5 | 1 | 2 | 3 | 4 | 5 | 6 | 7 | 8 | 9 | 10 | Final |
|---|---|---|---|---|---|---|---|---|---|---|---|
| (North Dakota) Christine McMakin | 0 | 0 | 0 | 1 | 0 | 1 | 0 | 4 | 0 | X | 6 |
| (North Carolina) Jamie Sinclair 🔨 | 1 | 1 | 3 | 0 | 1 | 0 | 2 | 0 | 2 | X | 10 |

| Sheet 6 | 1 | 2 | 3 | 4 | 5 | 6 | 7 | 8 | 9 | 10 | Final |
|---|---|---|---|---|---|---|---|---|---|---|---|
| (Minnesota) Madison Bear | 0 | 2 | 0 | 1 | 2 | 2 | 0 | 1 | 0 | 0 | 8 |
| (Minnesota) Delaney Strouse 🔨 | 3 | 0 | 1 | 0 | 0 | 0 | 1 | 0 | 1 | 1 | 7 |

=== Draw 2 ===
Wednesday, May 26, 4:00 pm

| Sheet 2 | 1 | 2 | 3 | 4 | 5 | 6 | 7 | 8 | 9 | 10 | Final |
|---|---|---|---|---|---|---|---|---|---|---|---|
| (North Dakota) Christine McMakin | 0 | 2 | 1 | 0 | 0 | 2 | 1 | 5 | 0 | X | 11 |
| (Minnesota) Delaney Strouse 🔨 | 2 | 0 | 0 | 1 | 2 | 0 | 0 | 0 | 3 | X | 8 |

| Sheet 4 | 1 | 2 | 3 | 4 | 5 | 6 | 7 | 8 | 9 | 10 | Final |
|---|---|---|---|---|---|---|---|---|---|---|---|
| (Minnesota) Kim Rhyme | 0 | 1 | 0 | 3 | 1 | 1 | 1 | 0 | 2 | X | 9 |
| (Minnesota) Madison Bear 🔨 | 1 | 0 | 2 | 0 | 0 | 0 | 0 | 1 | 0 | X | 4 |

| Sheet 6 | 1 | 2 | 3 | 4 | 5 | 6 | 7 | 8 | 9 | 10 | Final |
|---|---|---|---|---|---|---|---|---|---|---|---|
| (Alaska) Ariel Traxler 🔨 | 0 | 0 | 0 | 1 | 0 | X | X | X | X | X | 1 |
| (Minnesota) Cory Christensen | 3 | 4 | 3 | 0 | 2 | X | X | X | X | X | 12 |

=== Draw 3 ===
Thursday, May 27, 8:00 am

| Sheet 2 | 1 | 2 | 3 | 4 | 5 | 6 | 7 | 8 | 9 | 10 | Final |
|---|---|---|---|---|---|---|---|---|---|---|---|
| (Minnesota) Madison Bear | 0 | 2 | 1 | 1 | 0 | 1 | 1 | 2 | 1 | X | 9 |
| (Alaska) Ariel Traxler 🔨 | 2 | 0 | 0 | 0 | 2 | 0 | 0 | 0 | 0 | X | 4 |

| Sheet 5 | 1 | 2 | 3 | 4 | 5 | 6 | 7 | 8 | 9 | 10 | Final |
|---|---|---|---|---|---|---|---|---|---|---|---|
| (Minnesota) Cory Christensen 🔨 | 2 | 2 | 0 | 1 | 2 | 2 | X | X | X | X | 9 |
| (North Dakota) Christine McMakin | 0 | 0 | 1 | 0 | 0 | 0 | X | X | X | X | 1 |

| Sheet 6 | 1 | 2 | 3 | 4 | 5 | 6 | 7 | 8 | 9 | 10 | Final |
|---|---|---|---|---|---|---|---|---|---|---|---|
| (Minnesota) Kim Rhyme 🔨 | 1 | 0 | 1 | 0 | 1 | 1 | 0 | 0 | 1 | 0 | 5 |
| (North Carolina) Jamie Sinclair | 0 | 1 | 0 | 3 | 0 | 0 | 1 | 1 | 0 | 1 | 7 |

=== Draw 4 ===
Thursday, May 27, 4:00 pm

| Sheet 2 | 1 | 2 | 3 | 4 | 5 | 6 | 7 | 8 | 9 | 10 | Final |
|---|---|---|---|---|---|---|---|---|---|---|---|
| (Minnesota) Cory Christensen | 0 | 0 | 0 | 1 | 0 | 1 | 0 | 0 | X | X | 2 |
| (North Carolina) Jamie Sinclair 🔨 | 0 | 1 | 2 | 0 | 3 | 0 | 1 | 1 | X | X | 8 |

| Sheet 4 | 1 | 2 | 3 | 4 | 5 | 6 | 7 | 8 | 9 | 10 | Final |
|---|---|---|---|---|---|---|---|---|---|---|---|
| (Alaska) Ariel Traxler | 0 | 0 | 0 | 2 | 0 | 1 | 1 | 2 | 2 | X | 8 |
| (North Dakota) Christine McMakin 🔨 | 0 | 1 | 0 | 0 | 0 | 0 | 0 | 0 | 0 | X | 1 |

| Sheet 5 | 1 | 2 | 3 | 4 | 5 | 6 | 7 | 8 | 9 | 10 | Final |
|---|---|---|---|---|---|---|---|---|---|---|---|
| (Minnesota) Delaney Strouse 🔨 | 0 | 1 | 0 | 2 | 0 | 1 | 0 | 2 | 0 | 1 | 7 |
| (Minnesota) Kim Rhyme | 0 | 0 | 1 | 0 | 2 | 0 | 1 | 0 | 2 | 0 | 6 |

=== Draw 5 ===
Friday, May 28, 8:00 am

| Sheet 2 | 1 | 2 | 3 | 4 | 5 | 6 | 7 | 8 | 9 | 10 | Final |
|---|---|---|---|---|---|---|---|---|---|---|---|
| (Minnesota) Kim Rhyme | 0 | 0 | 0 | 0 | 3 | 0 | 1 | 0 | X | X | 4 |
| (North Dakota) Christine McMakin 🔨 | 0 | 0 | 2 | 3 | 0 | 3 | 0 | 2 | X | X | 10 |

| Sheet 4 | 1 | 2 | 3 | 4 | 5 | 6 | 7 | 8 | 9 | 10 | Final |
|---|---|---|---|---|---|---|---|---|---|---|---|
| (North Carolina) Jamie Sinclair 🔨 | 0 | 4 | 0 | 2 | 0 | 0 | 0 | 1 | 0 | X | 7 |
| (Minnesota) Delaney Strouse | 0 | 0 | 1 | 0 | 1 | 1 | 1 | 0 | 1 | X | 5 |

| Sheet 5 | 1 | 2 | 3 | 4 | 5 | 6 | 7 | 8 | 9 | 10 | Final |
|---|---|---|---|---|---|---|---|---|---|---|---|
| (Minnesota) Madison Bear | 0 | 0 | 1 | 0 | 1 | 1 | 0 | 0 | X | X | 3 |
| (Minnesota) Cory Christensen 🔨 | 2 | 0 | 0 | 1 | 0 | 0 | 3 | 2 | X | X | 8 |

=== Draw 6 ===
Friday, May 28, 4:00 pm

| Sheet 2 | 1 | 2 | 3 | 4 | 5 | 6 | 7 | 8 | 9 | 10 | Final |
|---|---|---|---|---|---|---|---|---|---|---|---|
| (North Carolina) Jamie Sinclair | 0 | 4 | 2 | 1 | 0 | 2 | X | X | X | X | 9 |
| (Minnesota) Madison Bear 🔨 | 1 | 0 | 0 | 0 | 1 | 0 | X | X | X | X | 2 |

| Sheet 4 | 1 | 2 | 3 | 4 | 5 | 6 | 7 | 8 | 9 | 10 | Final |
|---|---|---|---|---|---|---|---|---|---|---|---|
| (Minnesota) Cory Christensen 🔨 | 0 | 2 | 1 | 1 | 3 | 0 | 3 | X | X | X | 10 |
| (Minnesota) Kim Rhyme | 1 | 0 | 0 | 0 | 0 | 0 | 0 | X | X | X | 1 |

| Sheet 6 | 1 | 2 | 3 | 4 | 5 | 6 | 7 | 8 | 9 | 10 | 11 | Final |
|---|---|---|---|---|---|---|---|---|---|---|---|---|
| (Minnesota) Delaney Strouse 🔨 | 0 | 2 | 0 | 1 | 0 | 1 | 0 | 2 | 0 | 1 | 1 | 8 |
| (Alaska) Ariel Traxler | 0 | 0 | 1 | 0 | 2 | 0 | 1 | 0 | 3 | 0 | 0 | 7 |

=== Draw 7 ===
Saturday, May 29, 8:00 am

| Sheet 2 | 1 | 2 | 3 | 4 | 5 | 6 | 7 | 8 | 9 | 10 | Final |
|---|---|---|---|---|---|---|---|---|---|---|---|
| (Minnesota) Delaney Strouse 🔨 | 1 | 0 | 0 | 0 | 0 | 0 | 0 | 0 | 2 | 0 | 3 |
| (Minnesota) Cory Christensen | 0 | 0 | 0 | 1 | 0 | 1 | 2 | 1 | 0 | 1 | 6 |

| Sheet 5 | 1 | 2 | 3 | 4 | 5 | 6 | 7 | 8 | 9 | 10 | Final |
|---|---|---|---|---|---|---|---|---|---|---|---|
| (North Carolina) Jamie Sinclair 🔨 | 0 | 2 | 0 | 0 | 0 | 2 | 0 | 0 | 2 | X | 6 |
| (Alaska) Ariel Traxler | 0 | 0 | 0 | 0 | 1 | 0 | 0 | 1 | 0 | X | 2 |

| Sheet 6 | 1 | 2 | 3 | 4 | 5 | 6 | 7 | 8 | 9 | 10 | Final |
|---|---|---|---|---|---|---|---|---|---|---|---|
| (North Dakota) Christine McMakin 🔨 | 1 | 1 | 0 | 0 | 0 | 1 | 0 | 0 | 0 | 0 | 3 |
| (Minnesota) Madison Bear | 0 | 0 | 1 | 1 | 0 | 0 | 1 | 1 | 0 | 1 | 5 |

== Playoffs ==
| Semifinal | | | Final |
| | | | 1 | (North Carolina) Jamie Sinclair | 6 |
| 2 | (Minnesota) Cory Christensen | 7 | 2 | (Minnesota) Cory Christensen | 8 |
| 3 | (Minnesota) Madison Bear | 6 |

=== Semifinal ===
Sunday, May 30, 9:00 am

| Sheet 2 | 1 | 2 | 3 | 4 | 5 | 6 | 7 | 8 | 9 | 10 | Final |
|---|---|---|---|---|---|---|---|---|---|---|---|
| (Minnesota) Cory Christensen 🔨 | 1 | 0 | 3 | 0 | 1 | 0 | 0 | 2 | 0 | 0 | 7 |
| (Minnesota) Madison Bear | 0 | 1 | 0 | 2 | 0 | 1 | 0 | 0 | 1 | 1 | 6 |

=== Final ===
Sunday, May 30, 2:00 pm

| Sheet 4 | 1 | 2 | 3 | 4 | 5 | 6 | 7 | 8 | 9 | 10 | 11 | Final |
|---|---|---|---|---|---|---|---|---|---|---|---|---|
| (North Carolina) Jamie Sinclair 🔨 | 1 | 0 | 1 | 0 | 0 | 0 | 2 | 1 | 0 | 1 | 0 | 6 |
| (Minnesota) Cory Christensen | 0 | 3 | 0 | 0 | 0 | 2 | 0 | 0 | 1 | 0 | 2 | 8 |

2021 United States Women's Curling Championship

Cory Christensen
1st United States Championship title
