= 2020 United States Women's Curling Championship =

- Host city: Spokane, Washington
- Arena: Eastern Washington University; Recreation Center
- Dates: February 8–15
- Winner: (Minnesota) Team Peterson
- Curling club: St. Paul Curling Club, St. Paul, Minnesota
- Skip: Tabitha Peterson
- Third: Becca Hamilton
- Second: Tara Peterson
- Lead: Aileen Geving
- Coach: Natalie Nicholson
- Finalist: (North Carolina) Jamie Sinclair

The 2020 United States Women's Curling Championship was held from February 8 to 15, 2020 at the Eastern Washington University Recreation Center in Spokane, Washington. The event was held in conjunction with the 2020 United States Men's Curling Championship. In the final, Tabitha Peterson defeated Jamie Sinclair 7–5.

Since Team Peterson met certain prerequisites in terms of world ranking points (60 points year-to-date or ranked 70th or higher) they would have represented the United States at the 2020 World Women's Curling Championship, which was scheduled to be held in Prince George, British Columbia. The tournament was canceled due to COVID-19; as the 2021 United States Championship has been delayed to May 2021 due to COVID-19, the 2020 champions will represent the United States at the 2021 World Women's Curling Championship. Team Peterson will also appear in the 2021 Grand Slam of Curling Champions Cup in 2021.

== Qualification ==
There were three ways for teams to qualify for the championship:

- Top four American teams in the World Curling Federation (WCF) World Team Ranking System on Dec 2, 2019
  - Team Roth
  - Team Sinclair
  - Team Rhyme
  - Team Potter
- Three teams from the 2020 United States Women's Challenge Round
  - Team McMakin
  - Team Traxler
  - Team Podoll
- A team selected from the 2020 United States Junior Women's Championship
  - Team Strouse

=== Challenge round ===
Eight teams competed at the 2020 United States Women's Challenge Round, held at the Heather Curling Club in Mapleton, Minnesota, from January 3 to 5. Through a triple knockout competition the top three teams secured a spot at the National Championship. Two-time Junior Champion Christine McMakin was the first to secure a spot, defeating fellow junior curler Ariel Traxler in the 'A' bracket final. Traxler dropped down to the 'B' bracket final and had another opportunity to play for a spot in the Nationals, this time earning her spot by defeating Ann Podoll 8–4. Podoll then dropped to the 'C' bracket final where she defeated Stephanie Senneker to secure the third and final Nationals berth.

== Teams ==
Eight teams participated in the 2020 national championship. Team McMakin and Team Podoll changed names to Team Lank and Team Workin, respectively, due to line-up changes.

Skip	Third	Second	Lead	Alternate	Locale
Tabitha Peterson	Becca Hamilton	Tara Peterson	Aileen Geving		St. Paul, Minnesota
Jamie Sinclair	Cory Christensen	Vicky Persinger	Taylor Anderson	Sarah Anderson	Charlotte, North Carolina
Cassie Potter	Courtney George	Jackie Lemke	Jordan Moulton	Sophie Bader	St. Paul, Minnesota
Kim Rhyme	Elizabeth Brundage	Katie Rhyme	Amy Harnden		Minneapolis, Minnesota
Patti Lank	Christine McMakin	Anna Netteberg	Anne O'Hara	Emma Rau	St. Paul, Minnesota
Rachel Workin	Taylor Drees	Ann Podoll	Christina Lammers		Fargo, North Dakota
Elizabeth Cousins (Fourth)	Katherine Gourianova	Elizabeth Janiak	Ariel Traxler (Skip)		Fairbanks, Alaska
Delaney Strouse	Sydney Mullaney	Susan Dudt	Rebecca Rodgers		Malvern, Pennsylvania

== Round-robin standings ==
Final round-robin standings

Key
Teams to playoffs

Skip	W	L
(North Carolina) Jamie Sinclair	6	1
(Minnesota) Tabitha Peterson	6	1
(Alaska) Ariel Traxler	4	3
(Minnesota) Patti Lank	3	4
(Minnesota) Cassie Potter	3	4
(Minnesota) Kim Rhyme	2	5
(Pennsylvania) Delaney Strouse	2	5
(North Dakota) Rachel Workin	2	5

== Round-robin results ==
All draw times are listed in Pacific Standard Time (UTC−08:00).

=== Draw 1 ===
Sunday, February 9, 8:00 am

Sheet A	1	2	3	4	5	6	7	8	9	10	Final
(Pennsylvania) Delaney Strouse	1	0	1	0	1	0	1	0	0	X	4
(Minnesota) Cassie Potter	0	2	0	3	0	1	0	2	2	X	10

Sheet B	1	2	3	4	5	6	7	8	9	10	Final
(Minnesota) Tabitha Peterson	2	0	1	0	0	0	0	2	0	X	5
(Alaska) Ariel Traxler	0	0	0	0	1	0	0	0	1	X	2

Sheet C	1	2	3	4	5	6	7	8	9	10	Final
(Minnesota) Kim Rhyme	0	1	2	0	0	0	3	0	0	X	6
(Minnesota) Patti Lank	3	0	0	0	3	1	0	1	1	X	9

Sheet D	1	2	3	4	5	6	7	8	9	10	Final
(North Carolina) Jamie Sinclair	1	2	1	0	3	1	X	X	X	X	8
(North Dakota) Rachel Workin	0	0	0	1	0	0	X	X	X	X	1

=== Draw 2 ===
Sunday, February 9, 4:00 pm

Sheet A	1	2	3	4	5	6	7	8	9	10	Final
(Minnesota) Kim Rhyme	0	2	0	0	0	2	0	2	0	5	11
(North Dakota) Rachel Workin	2	0	1	1	2	0	1	0	1	0	8

Sheet B	1	2	3	4	5	6	7	8	9	10	Final
(North Carolina) Jamie Sinclair	1	1	0	0	0	1	0	0	2	X	5
(Minnesota) Patti Lank	0	0	0	0	1	0	0	1	0	X	2

Sheet D	1	2	3	4	5	6	7	8	9	10	Final
(Minnesota) Cassie Potter	1	2	1	1	0	1	0	1	X	X	7
(Alaska) Ariel Traxler	0	0	0	0	1	0	1	0	X	X	2

Sheet E	1	2	3	4	5	6	7	8	9	10	Final
(Minnesota) Tabitha Peterson	0	2	0	3	1	0	1	0	2	1	10
(Pennsylvania) Delaney Strouse	2	0	1	0	0	2	0	1	0	0	6

=== Draw 3 ===
Monday, February 10, 2:00 pm

Sheet A	1	2	3	4	5	6	7	8	9	10	Final
(North Carolina) Jamie Sinclair	2	2	0	0	0	3	0	1	X	X	8
(Alaska) Ariel Traxler	0	0	1	0	0	0	1	0	X	X	2

Sheet B	1	2	3	4	5	6	7	8	9	10	11	Final
(Pennsylvania) Delaney Strouse	1	0	0	0	0	1	0	3	0	1	1	7
(Minnesota) Kim Rhyme	0	1	1	1	1	0	1	0	1	0	0	6

Sheet C	1	2	3	4	5	6	7	8	9	10	Final
(Minnesota) Tabitha Peterson	1	0	1	1	0	0	4	2	X	X	9
(North Dakota) Rachel Workin	0	2	0	0	0	1	0	0	X	X	3

Sheet E	1	2	3	4	5	6	7	8	9	10	Final
(Minnesota) Patti Lank	1	0	0	1	0	3	0	1	0	X	6
(Minnesota) Cassie Potter	0	0	0	0	1	0	1	0	1	X	3

=== Draw 4 ===
Tuesday, February 11, 9:00 am

Sheet B	1	2	3	4	5	6	7	8	9	10	Final
(North Dakota) Rachel Workin	1	0	0	1	0	1	1	0	2	1	7
(Minnesota) Cassie Potter	0	1	1	0	3	0	0	1	0	0	6

Sheet C	1	2	3	4	5	6	7	8	9	10	11	Final
(Minnesota) Patti Lank	1	1	0	1	0	0	0	0	1	1	0	5
(Alaska) Ariel Traxler	0	0	3	0	0	0	1	1	0	0	1	6

Sheet D	1	2	3	4	5	6	7	8	9	10	Final
(Minnesota) Kim Rhyme	2	0	1	0	2	2	1	0	1	0	9
(Minnesota) Tabitha Peterson	0	1	0	4	0	0	0	4	0	1	10

Sheet E	1	2	3	4	5	6	7	8	9	10	Final
(Pennsylvania) Delaney Strouse	0	0	0	2	1	0	3	0	0	X	6
(North Carolina) Jamie Sinclair	2	1	2	0	0	3	0	2	2	X	12

=== Draw 5 ===
Tuesday, February 11, 7:00 pm

Sheet A	1	2	3	4	5	6	7	8	9	10	Final
(Minnesota) Cassie Potter	0	2	0	1	0	2	1	0	4	X	10
(Minnesota) Kim Rhyme	0	0	1	0	4	0	0	1	0	X	6

Sheet B	1	2	3	4	5	6	7	8	9	10	11	Final
(Alaska) Ariel Traxler	1	0	0	1	1	0	1	2	1	0	1	8
(North Dakota) Rachel Workin	0	2	2	0	0	2	0	0	0	1	0	7

Sheet C	1	2	3	4	5	6	7	8	9	10	11	Final
(North Carolina) Jamie Sinclair	1	0	0	1	0	2	0	2	1	0	1	8
(Minnesota) Tabitha Peterson	0	1	0	0	1	0	3	0	0	2	0	7

Sheet D	1	2	3	4	5	6	7	8	9	10	Final
(Pennsylvania) Delaney Strouse	0	0	1	1	1	1	0	1	1	1	7
(Minnesota) Patti Lank	1	2	0	0	0	0	1	0	0	0	4

=== Draw 6 ===
Wednesday, February 12, 2:00 pm

Sheet B	1	2	3	4	5	6	7	8	9	10	11	Final
(Minnesota) Kim Rhyme	2	0	1	0	1	1	0	0	0	3	1	9
(North Carolina) Jamie Sinclair	0	2	0	3	0	0	2	1	0	0	0	8

Sheet C	1	2	3	4	5	6	7	8	9	10	Final
(Alaska) Ariel Traxler	2	0	0	1	2	1	0	2	3	X	11
(Pennsylvania) Delaney Strouse	0	0	1	0	0	0	1	0	0	X	2

Sheet D	1	2	3	4	5	6	7	8	9	10	Final
(Minnesota) Tabitha Peterson	2	1	4	1	0	X	X	X	X	X	8
(Minnesota) Cassie Potter	0	0	0	0	1	X	X	X	X	X	1

Sheet E	1	2	3	4	5	6	7	8	9	10	Final
(North Dakota) Rachel Workin	0	3	0	0	1	0	2	0	X	X	6
(Minnesota) Patti Lank	1	0	2	3	0	1	0	4	X	X	11

=== Draw 7 ===
Thursday, February 13, 9:00 am

Sheet A	1	2	3	4	5	6	7	8	9	10	Final
(Minnesota) Patti Lank	0	0	2	0	1	0	0	X	X	X	3
(Minnesota) Tabitha Peterson	2	2	0	4	0	2	2	X	X	X	12

Sheet C	1	2	3	4	5	6	7	8	9	10	Final
(Minnesota) Cassie Potter	0	0	0	0	0	0	0	X	X	X	0
(North Carolina) Jamie Sinclair	2	1	1	1	1	0	2	X	X	X	8

Sheet D	1	2	3	4	5	6	7	8	9	10	Final
(North Dakota) Rachel Workin	2	3	2	2	0	0	0	1	X	X	10
(Pennsylvania) Delaney Strouse	0	0	0	0	1	1	2	0	X	X	4

Sheet E	1	2	3	4	5	6	7	8	9	10	11	Final
(Alaska) Ariel Traxler	0	2	0	3	0	1	1	0	0	0	2	9
(Minnesota) Kim Rhyme	0	0	1	0	2	0	0	2	1	1	0	7

== Playoffs ==
Page playoff
1	(North Carolina) Jamie Sinclair	4
2	(Minnesota) Tabitha Peterson	9

Semifinal
1	(North Carolina) Jamie Sinclair	11
3	(Alaska) Ariel Traxler	5

Final
2	(Minnesota) Tabitha Peterson	7
1	(North Carolina) Jamie Sinclair	5

=== 1 vs. 2 ===
Friday, February 14, 12:00 pm

Sheet D	1	2	3	4	5	6	7	8	9	10	Final
(North Carolina) Jamie Sinclair	1	0	2	1	0	0	0	0	X	X	4
(Minnesota) Tabitha Peterson	0	5	0	0	0	1	1	2	X	X	9

Player percentages
(North Carolina) Team Sinclair		(Minnesota) Team Peterson	
Taylor Anderson	76%	Aileen Geving	83%
Vicky Persinger	81%	Tara Peterson	86%
Cory Christensen	85%	Becca Hamilton	92%
Jamie Sinclair	68%	Tabitha Peterson	90%
Total	77%	Total	88%

=== Semifinal ===
Friday, February 14, 7:00 pm

Sheet B	1	2	3	4	5	6	7	8	9	10	Final
(North Carolina) Jamie Sinclair	0	0	1	0	1	0	5	0	4	X	11
(Alaska) Ariel Traxler	0	0	0	3	0	1	0	1	0	X	5

Player percentages
(North Carolina) Team Sinclair		(Alaska) Team Traxler	
Taylor Anderson	81%	Ariel Traxler	84%
Vicky Persinger	79%	Elizabeth Janiak	80%
Cory Christensen	81%	Katherine Gourianova	70%
Jamie Sinclair	73%	Elizabeth Cousins	66%
Total	79%	Total	75%

=== Final ===
Saturday, February 15, 12:00 pm

Sheet C	1	2	3	4	5	6	7	8	9	10	Final
(Minnesota) Tabitha Peterson	1	1	0	3	0	1	0	0	1	X	7
(North Carolina) Jamie Sinclair	0	0	3	0	1	0	1	0	0	X	5

Player percentages
(Minnesota) Team Peterson		(North Carolina) Team Sinclair	
Aileen Geving	85%	Taylor Anderson	88%
Tara Peterson	79%	Vicky Persinger	84%
Becca Hamilton	85%	Cory Christensen	71%
Tabitha Peterson	85%	Jamie Sinclair	74%
Total	84%	Total	79%

2020 United States Women's Curling Championship

Tabitha Peterson
2nd United States Championship title
