= 2012 Edinburgh International =

- Host city: Edinburgh, Scotland
- Arena: Murrayfield Curling Club
- Dates: November 8–11
- Winner: (Scotland) Tom Brewster
- Skip: Tom Brewster
- Third: Greg Drummond
- Second: Scott Andrews
- Lead: Michael Goodfellow
- Finalist: (Germany) John Jahr

The 2012 Edinburgh International was held from November 8 to 11 at the Murrayfield Curling Club in Edinburgh, Scotland as part of the 2012–13 Curling Champions Tour. The event was held in a round robin format, and the purse for the event was GBP£10,000, of which the winner, Tom Brewster, received GBP£4,000. Brewster defeated John Jahr of Germany in the final with a score of 3–2.

== Teams ==
The teams are listed as follows:

| Skip | Third | Second | Lead | Alternate | Locale |
|---|---|---|---|---|---|
| Graeme Black | Scott Hamilton | Colin Howden | Allan Marshall | | Scotland |
| Tom Brewster | Greg Drummond | Scott Andrews | Michael Goodfellow | David Murdoch | Aberdeen, Scotland |
| Tony Angiboust (fourth) | Thomas Dufour (skip) | Lionel Roux | Wilfrid Coulot | Jérémy Frarier | Chamonix, France |
| David Edwards | John Penny | Scott Macleod | Colin Campbell | | Scotland |
| Mario Freiberger | Sven Iten | Pascal Eicher | Rainer Kobler | | Switzerland |
| Logan Gray | Ross Paterson | Alasdair Guthrie | Richard Woods | | Stirling, Scotland |
| John Hamilton | Colin Dick | Jamie Dick | Phil Garden | | Scotland |
| Grant Hardie | Jay McWilliam | Hammy McMillan Jr. | Billy Morton | | Dumfries, Scotland |
| Pascal Hess | Yves Hess | Florian Meister | Stefan Meienberg | | Switzerland |
| Felix Schulze (fourth) | John Jahr (skip) | Peter Rickmers | Sven Goldemann | Christoph Daase | Hamburg, Germany |
| Aku Kauste | Jani Sullanmaa | Pauli Jäämies | Janne Pitko | Leo Mäkelä | Hyvinkaa, Finland |
| Thomas Løvold | Petter Moe | Sander Rølvåg | Johan Høstmælingen | | Norway |
| Steffen Mellemseter | Markus Høiberg | Steffen Walstad | Magnus Nedregotten | | Norway |
| Glen Muirhead | David Reid | Steven Mitchell | Kerr Drummond | | Perth, Scotland |
| Hammy McMillan (fourth) | Moray Combe | Sandy Reid (skip) | Sandy Gilmour | | Stranraer, Scotland |
| Graham Shaw | Brian Binnie | Richard Goldie | Rob Niven | | Perth, Scotland |
| David Šik | Radek Boháč | Karel Uher | Milan Polívka | | Czech Republic |
| Kyle Smith | Thomas Muirhead | Kyle Waddell | Cammy Smith | | Perth, Scotland |
| Warwick Smith | David Smith | Alan Smith | Ross Hepburn | | Perth, Scotland |
| Jiří Snítil | Martin Snítil | Jindřich Kitzberger | Marek Vydra | | Brno, Czech Republic |
| Fabio Sola | Julien Genre | Simone Gonin | Graziano Iacovetti | Simone Sola | Italy |
| Alexey Tselousov | Alexey Stukalsky | Andrey Drozdov | Artur Razhabov | Petr Dron | Moscow, Russia |
| Japp van Dorp | Carlo Glasbergen | Miles MacLure | Joey Bruinsma | | Netherlands |
| Murray Young | Blair Fraser | Ruaraidh Greenwood | Ian Copland | | Scotland |

== Round robin standings ==
Final Round Robin Standings

Key
| Teams to Playoffs |

| Pool A | W | L |
|---|---|---|
| (Finland) Aku Kauste | 4 | 1 |
| (Norway) Thomas Løvold | 3 | 2 |
| (Scotland) David Edwards | 2 | 3 |
| (Scotland) John Hamilton | 2 | 3 |
| (Scotland) Kyle Smith | 2 | 3 |
| (Russia) Alexey Tselousov | 2 | 3 |

| Pool B | W | L |
|---|---|---|
| (Scotland) Grant Hardie | 4 | 1 |
| (Scotland) Tom Brewster | 3 | 2 |
| (Switzerland) Pascal Hess | 3 | 2 |
| (Czech Republic) Jiři Snítil | 2 | 2 |
| (Scotland) Murray Young | 2 | 3 |
| (Switzerland) Mario Freiberger | 0 | 4 |

| Pool C | W | L |
|---|---|---|
| (Scotland) Logan Gray | 4 | 1 |
| (Scotland) Graeme Black | 4 | 1 |
| (France) Thomas Dufour | 3 | 2 |
| (Scotland) Graham Shaw | 2 | 2 |
| (Norway) Steffen Mellemseter | 1 | 4 |
| (Netherlands) Jaap van Dorp | 0 | 4 |

| Pool D | W | L |
|---|---|---|
| (Germany) John Jahr | 4 | 1 |
| (Scotland) Glen Muirhead | 3 | 1 |
| (Scotland) Sandy Reid | 3 | 2 |
| (Scotland) Warwick Smith | 2 | 3 |
| (Czech Republic) David Šik | 1 | 3 |
| (Italy) Fabio Sola | 1 | 4 |

== Playoffs ==
The playoffs draw is listed as follows:

Quarterfinals
(Finland) Aku Kauste | 5
(Scotland) Tom Brewster | 6
(Scotland) Logan Gray | 4
(Scotland) Glen Muirhead | 7
(Germany) John Jahr | 6
(Scotland) Graeme Black | 5
(Scotland) Grant Hardie | 7
(Norway) Thomas Løvold | 4

Semifinals
(Scotland) Tom Brewster | 4
(Scotland) Glen Muirhead | 3
(Germany) John Jahr | 6
(Scotland) Grant Hardie | 3

Final
(Scotland) Tom Brewster | 3
(Germany) John Jahr | 2
