= 2014 Mercure Perth Masters =

- Host city: Perth, Scotland
- Arena: Dewars Centre
- Dates: 2–5 January
- Winner: (Scotland) Logan Gray
- Skip: Logan Gray
- Third: Glen Muirhead
- Second: Ross Paterson
- Lead: Richard Woods
- Finalist: (Sweden) Oskar Eriksson

The 2014 Mercure Perth Masters were held from 2 to 5 January at the Dewars Centre in Perth, Scotland as part of the 2013–14 World Curling Tour. The event was held in a triple-knockout format, and the purse for the event was £17,160, of which the winner, Logan Gray of Scotland, received £6,000. Gray defeated Sweden's Oskar Eriksson in the final with a score of 5–4.

== Teams ==
The teams are listed as follows:

Skip	Third	Second	Lead	Alternate	Locale
Artur Ali	Sergey Glukhov	Dimitry Mironov	Timur Gadzhikhanov	Alexandr Kuzmin	Moscow, Russia
Robin Brydone	James Carswell	Calum Greenwood	Thomas Halder		Perth, Scotland
Moray Combe	Alasdair Guthrie	Murray Young	David Soutar		Dunfermline, Scotland
Benoît Schwarz (fourth)	Peter de Cruz (skip)	Dominik Märki	Valentin Tanner		Geneva, Switzerland
Andrey Drozdov	Evgeniy Arkhipov	Alexey Tselousov	Petr Dron	Alexander Kozyrev	Moscow, Russia
Niklas Edin	Sebastian Kraupp	Fredrik Lindberg	Viktor Kjäll		Karlstad, Sweden
David Edwards	John Penny	Scott MacLeod	Colin Campbell		Aberdeen, Scotland
Oskar Eriksson	Kristian Lindström	Markus Eriksson	Christoffer Sundgren		Lit, Sweden
Blair Fraser	Ally Fraser	Ross Fraser	Ruairidh Greenwood		Inverness, Scotland
Mario Freiberger	Sven Iten	Patrick Poll	Rainer Kobler		Zug, Switzerland
Logan Gray	Glen Muirhead	Ross Paterson	Richard Woods		Stirling, Scotland
Grant Hardie	Jay McWilliam	Hammy McMillan Jr.	Billy Morton		Dumfries, Scotland
Pascal Hess	Florian Meister	Meico Öhninger	Stefan Meienberg		Zug, Switzerland
Markus Høiberg	Steffen Mellemsetter	Steffen Walstad	Magnus Nedregotten		Oppdal, Norway
Aku Kauste	Jani Sullanmaa	Pauli Jäämies	Janne Pitko		Hyvinkaa, Finland
Ewan MacDonald	Duncan Fernie	David Reid	Euan Byers		Perth, Scotland
Lee McCleary	Robbie Stevenson	Sandy Christie	Stewart Stark		Stirling, Scotland
Ross McCleary	James Stark	Craig Gudmundsson	Gavin Baird		Kinross, Scotland
Mike McEwen	B. J. Neufeld	Matt Wozniak	Denni Neufeld		(Canada) Winnipeg, Manitoba
Sven Michel	Claudio Pätz	Sandro Trolliet	Simon Gempeler		Adelboden, Switzerland
Bruce Mouat	Duncan Menzies	Derrick Sloan	Angus Dowell		Edinburgh, Scotland
David Murdoch	Tom Brewster	Greg Drummond	Michael Goodfellow	Scott Andrews	Aberdeen, Scotland
Tomi Rantamäki	Pekka Peura	Kimmo Ilvonen	Jermu Pöllanen		Helsinki, Finland
Graham Shaw	Brian Binnie	Graham Cormack	Robin Niven		Perth, Scotland
Graham Shedden	Chay Telfer	Graeme Hay	Daniel Arrandale		Howwood, Scotland
John Shuster	Jeff Isaacson	Jared Zezel	John Landsteiner		(United States) Duluth, Minnesota
David Šik	Radek Boháč	Thomas Paul	Milan Polívka		Prague, Czech Republic
Kyle Smith	Thomas Muirhead	Kyle Waddell	Cammy Smith		Perth, Scotland
Warwick Smith	David Smith	Sandy Reid	Ross Hepburn		Perth, Scotland
Torkil Svensgaard	Martin Uhd Grønbech	Daniel Abrahamsen	Morten Berg Thomsen		Høje-Tåstrup, Denmark
Thomas Ulsrud	Torger Nergård	Christoffer Svae	Håvard Vad Petersson		Oslo, Norway
Jaap van Dorp	Joey Bruinsma	Miles Maclure	Carlo Glasbergen		Zoetermeer, Netherlands

== Knockout results ==
=== A event ===
First Knockout
(Scotland) Ross McCleary	3
(Sweden) Niklas Edin	4
(Norway) Markus Høiberg	2
(Scotland) Warwick Smith	5
(United States) John Shuster	6
(Scotland) Randy Brydone	2
(Finland) Tomi Rantamäki	3
(Scotland) David Edwards	4
(Scotland) David Murdoch	2
(Russia) Artur Ali	7
(Finland) Aku Kauste	7
(Scotland) Kyle Smith	9
(Switzerland) Mario Freiberger	2
(Scotland) Grant Hardie	8
(Sweden) Oskar Eriksson	10
(Scotland) Moray Combe	2

Quarterfinals
(Sweden) Niklas Edin	7
(Scotland) Warwick Smith	2
(United States) John Shuster	4
(Scotland) David Edwards	6
(Russia) Artur Ali	5
(Scotland) Kyle Smith	7
(Scotland) Grant Hardie	7
(Sweden) Oskar Eriksson	3

Semifinals
(Sweden) Niklas Edin	1
(Scotland) David Edwards	6
(Scotland) Kyle Smith	2
(Scotland) Grant Hardie	4

Qualifier 1
(Scotland) David Edwards	3
(Scotland) Grant Hardie	7

First Knockout
(Scotland) Lee McCleary	3
(Norway) Thomas Ulsrud	4
(Switzerland) Pascal Hess	5
(Netherlands) Jaap van Dorp	1
(Scotland) Ewan MacDonald	6
(Denmark) Torkil Svensgaard	1
(Scotland) Bruce Mouat	4
(Switzerland) Sven Michel	6
(Switzerland) Peter de Cruz	6
(Scotland) Graham Shedden	2
(Scotland) Logan Gray	5
(Russia) Andrey Drozdov	3
(Czech Republic) David Šik	6
(Scotland) Blair Fraser	5
(Canada) Mike McEwen	9
(Scotland) Graham Shaw	1

Quarterfinals
(Norway) Thomas Ulsrud	7
(Switzerland) Pascal Hess	3
(Scotland) Ewan MacDonald	4
(Switzerland) Sven Michel	6
(Switzerland) Peter de Cruz	4
(Scotland) Logan Gray	5
(Czech Republic) David Šik	2
(Canada) Mike McEwen	7

Semifinals
(Norway) Thomas Ulsrud	6
(Switzerland) Sven Michel	2
(Scotland) Logan Gray	3
(Canada) Mike McEwen	7

Qualifier 2
(Norway) Thomas Ulsrud	4
(Canada) Mike McEwen	10

=== B event ===
Second Knockout
(Scotland) Ross McCleary	5
(Norway) Markus Høiberg	6
(Scotland) Randy Brydone	5
(Finland) Tomi Rantamäki	6
(Scotland) David Murdoch	4
(Finland) Aku Kauste	7
(Switzerland) Mario Freiberger	7
(Scotland) Moray Combe	4

Quarterfinals
(Norway) Markus Høiberg	5
(Finland) Tomi Rantamäki	6
(Finland) Aku Kauste	6
(Switzerland) Mario Freiberger	2

Semifinals
(Finland) Tomi Rantamäki	5
(Switzerland) Sven Michel	6
(Finland) Aku Kauste	4
(Scotland) Logan Gray	7

To Qualifier 3
(Switzerland) Sven Michel	2
(Scotland) Logan Gray	3
Qualifier 3
(Scotland) Logan Gray	5
(Norway) Thomas Ulsrud	1

Second Knockout		Semifinals		To Qualifier 3
(Switzerland) Pascal Hess	9
(Scotland) Ewan MacDonald	2	(Switzerland) Pascal Hess	2
(Switzerland) Peter de Cruz	8	(Switzerland) Peter de Cruz	5
(Czech Republic) David Šik	2			(Switzerland) Peter de Cruz	3
				(Norway) Thomas Ulsrud	5

Second Knockout		Semifinals		To Qualifier 4
(Scotland) Warwick Smith	6
(United States) John Shuster	2	(Scotland) Warwick Smith	1
(Russia) Artur Ali	6	(Sweden) Oskar Eriksson	6
(Sweden) Oskar Eriksson	8			(Sweden) Oskar Eriksson	4
				(Scotland) David Edwards	3

Second Knockout
(Scotland) Lee McCleary	6
(Netherlands) Jaap van Dorp	3
(Denmark) Torkil Svensgaard	3
(Scotland) Bruce Mouat	5
(Scotland) Graham Shedden	4
(Russia) Andrey Drozdov	8
(Scotland) Blair Fraser	4
(Scotland) Graham Shaw	3

Quarterfinals
(Scotland) Lee McCleary	5
(Scotland) Bruce Mouat	3
(Russia) Andrey Drozdov	9
(Scotland) Blair Fraser	2

Semifinals
(Sweden) Niklas Edin	6
(Scotland) Lee McCleary	3
(Scotland) Kyle Smith	6
(Russia) Andrey Drozdov	3

To Qualifier 4
(Sweden) Niklas Edin	0
(Scotland) Kyle Smith	7
Qualifier 4
(Sweden) Oskar Eriksson	7
(Scotland) Kyle Smith	6

=== C event ===
Third Knockout
(Scotland) Ross McCleary	4
(Scotland) Randy Brydone	7
(Scotland) David Murdoch	8
(Scotland) Moray Combe	1

Quarterfinals
(Scotland) Ewan MacDonald	8
(Scotland) Randy Brydone	3
(Czech Republic) David Šik	5
(Scotland) David Murdoch	2

Semifinals
(Scotland) Ewan MacDonald	6
(Czech Republic) David Šik	3

Qualifier 5
(Scotland) Ewan MacDonald	2
(Norway) Thomas Ulsrud	8

Third Knockout
(Norway) Markus Høiberg	6
(Switzerland) Mario Freiberger	5

Quarterfinals
(Scotland) Lee McCleary	8
(Russia) Andrey Drozdov	4
(Switzerland) Pascal Hess	4
(Norway) Markus Høiberg	2

Semifinals
(Scotland) Lee McCleary	3
(Switzerland) Sven Michel	7
(Switzerland) Pascal Hess	4
(Scotland) David Edwards	3

Qualifier 6
(Switzerland) Sven Michel	4
(Switzerland) Pascal Hess	'8

Third Knockout
(Scotland) Bruce Mouat	8
(Scotland) Blair Fraser	1

Quarterfinals
(Scotland) Warwick Smith	5
(Scotland) Bruce Mouat	2
(Finland) Tomi Rantamäki	7
(Finland) Aku Kauste	2

Semifinals
(Scotland) Warwick Smith	3
(Switzerland) Peter de Cruz	10
(Finland) Tomi Rantamäki	2
(Sweden) Niklas Edin	9

Qualifier 7
(Switzerland) Peter de Cruz	6
(Sweden) Niklas Edin	0

Third Knockout
(Netherlands) Jaap van Dorp	7
(Denmark) Torkil Svensgaard	6
(Scotland) Graham Shedden	4
(Scotland) Graham Shaw	7

Quarterfinals
(United States) John Shuster	6
(Netherlands) Jaap van Dorp	0
(Russia) Artur Ali	1
(Scotland) Graham Shaw	4

Semifinals
(United States) John Shuster	4
(Scotland) Graham Shaw	3

Qualifier 8
(United States) John Shuster	3
(Scotland) Kyle Smith	4

== Playoffs ==
Quarterfinals
(Scotland) Grant Hardie	5
(Scotland) Kyle Smith	6
(Scotland) Logan Gray	4
(Switzerland) Pascal Hess	2
(Sweden) Oskar Eriksson	5
(Norway) Thomas Ulsrud	4
(Canada) Mike McEwen	4
(Switzerland) Peter de Cruz	2

Semifinals
(Scotland) Kyle Smith	3
(Scotland) Logan Gray	6
(Sweden) Oskar Eriksson	6
(Canada) Mike McEwen	4

Final
(Scotland) Logan Gray	5
(Sweden) Oskar Eriksson	4
