= Hammy McMillan Jr. =

Scottish curler (born 1992)

- Curler
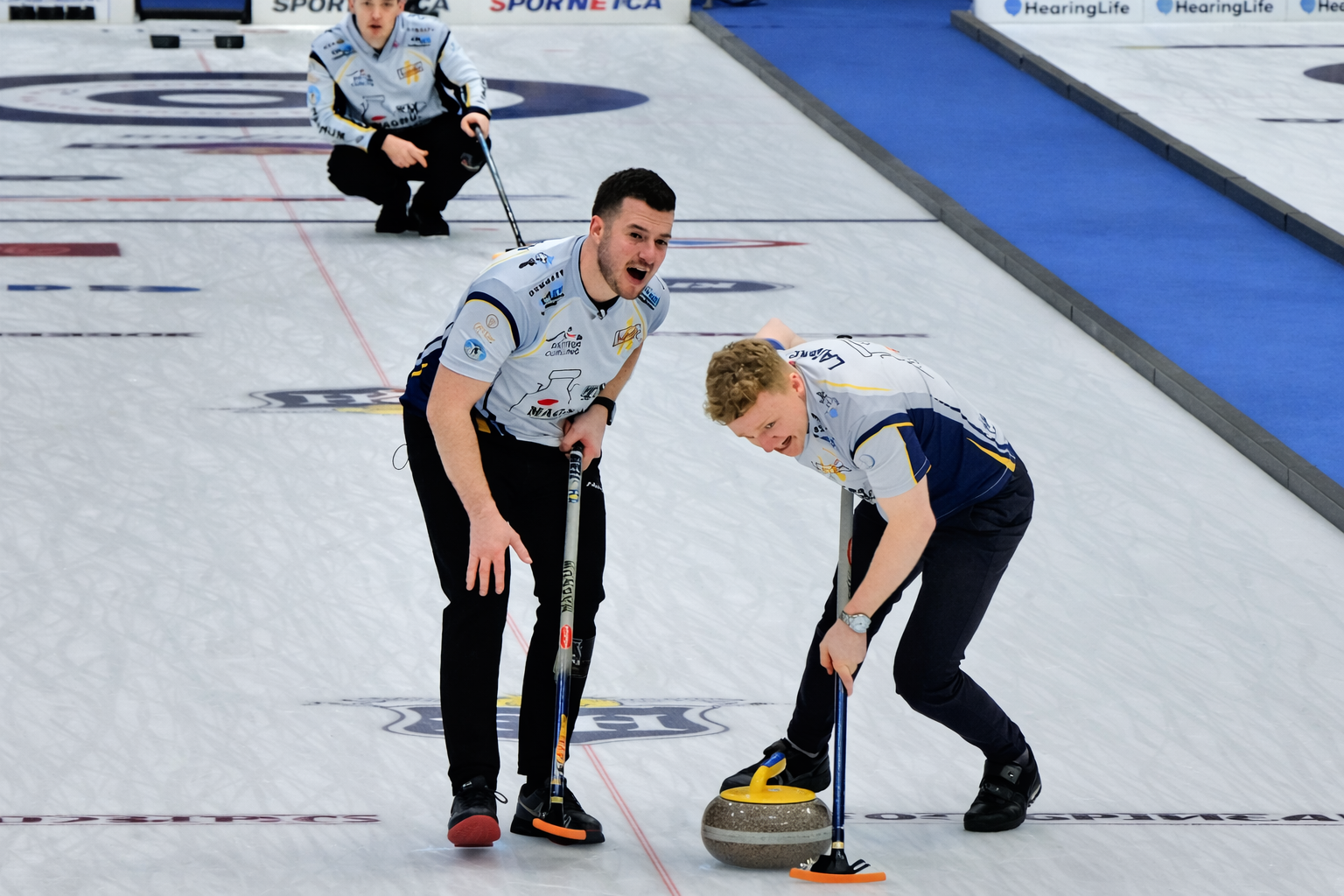
- McMillan Jr. (left) sweeps a rock for Bruce Mouat at the 2026 Players' Championship.
- Other names: Hamilton McMillan Jr.
- Born: 29 May 1992 (age 34); Stranraer, Scotland

Team
- Curling club: Castle Kennedy CC, Stranraer, SCO
- Skip: Bruce Mouat
- Third: Robin Brydone
- Second: Bobby Lammie
- Lead: Hammy McMillan Jr.

Curling career
- Member Association: Scotland; Great Britain
- World Championship: 7 (2016, 2018, 2019, 2021, 2023, 2024, 2025)
- European Championship: 7 (2016, 2018, 2021, 2022, 2023, 2024, 2025)
- Olympic: 2 (2022, 2026)
- Grand Slam victories: 12 (2017 National, 2021 Champions Cup, 2021 Players', 2021 Masters, 2022 Players', 2024 Canadian Open (Jan.), 2024 Tour Challenge, 2024 Canadian Open (Nov.), 2024 National, 2025 Players', 2025 Tour Challenge, 2025 GSOC Tahoe)
Medal record
Men's curling
Representing Great Britain
Olympic Games
| Silver medal – second place | 2022 Beijing | Team |
| Silver medal – second place | 2026 Milano Cortina | Team |
Representing Scotland
World Championships
| Gold medal – first place | 2023 Ottawa |
| Gold medal – first place | 2025 Moose Jaw |
| Silver medal – second place | 2021 Calgary |
| Bronze medal – third place | 2018 Las Vegas |
European Championships
| Gold medal – first place | 2018 Tallinn |
| Gold medal – first place | 2021 Lillehammer |
| Gold medal – first place | 2022 Östersund |
| Gold medal – first place | 2023 Aberdeen |
| Silver medal – second place | 2024 Lohja |
| Bronze medal – third place | 2025 Lohja |
World Junior Championships
| Gold medal – first place | 2013 Sochi |
| Bronze medal – third place | 2012 Östersund |
Scottish Men's Championship
| Gold medal – first place | 2016 Perth |
| Gold medal – first place | 2018 Perth |
| Gold medal – first place | 2019 Perth |
| Gold medal – first place | 2020 Perth |
| Gold medal – first place | 2023 Dumfries |
| Silver medal – second place | 2025 Dumfries |
| Bronze medal – third place | 2024 Dumfries |
Scottish Mixed Doubles Championship
| Bronze medal – third place | 2022 Perth |

Hamilton McMillan Jr. (born 29 May 1992 in Stranraer) is a Scottish curler from Glasgow. He currently plays lead on Team Bruce Mouat. With Mouat, McMillan has won gold at the world men's championship in 2023 and 2025 and has won four European championship titles (2018, 2021, 2022 and 2023) and twelve Grand Slam titles. He earned two silver medals in the men's team event of the Winter Olympics (2022, 2026). He is also a former World Junior (2013) champion.

== Career ==
=== 2012–2017 ===
In his final two seasons of juniors, McMillan reached the semifinals and finals of the Scottish Junior Curling Championships, losing out to the Kyle Smith rink on both occasions. Despite this, McMillan was invited to join Team Smith at both the 2012 and 2013 World Junior Curling Championships as their alternate. In 2012, the team went 7–2 through the round robin before losing the 3 vs. 4 page playoff game to Norway's Markus Høiberg. However, they avenged this loss in the bronze medal game when they defeated the same Norwegian team to finish third. In 2013, the team topped the round robin with an 8–1 record. They then beat Canada's Matt Dunstone in the 1 vs. 2 page playoff game and then defeated Russia's Evgeny Arkhipov to secure the gold medal. It was Scotland's first time winning the event since 1996.

Although they did not win the Scottish junior championship, McMillan and his team of Grant Hardie, Jay McWilliam and Billy Morton found success on the men's tour during the 2012–13 season. The team had two semifinals finishes at the 2012 Radisson Blu Oslo Cup and the 2012 Edinburgh International and a quarterfinal finish at the 2013 Mercure Perth Masters. The following season, the Dumfries rink continued their success with two more semifinal appearances at the Curling Masters Champéry and the Edinburgh International. After the team missed the playoffs at the 2014 Scottish Men's Curling Championship they disbanded, with McMillan joining the Tom Brewster rink at lead for the 2014–15 season. The team, with third Glen Muirhead, second Ross Paterson and alternate Thomas Muirhead won three events in their first season together, the Swiss Cup Basel, the Curling Masters Champéry and the Dumfries Curling Challenge. They would miss out on the playoffs at the 2015 Scottish Men's Curling Championship, finishing with a 4–5 record.

Team Brewster had a strong tour season during the 2015–16 season, beginning at the Baden Masters where they lost in the final to Sweden's Niklas Edin. They next played in the 2015 GSOC Tour Challenge Tier 2 event where they made it to the semifinals, losing out to Mark Kean. The team played in the qualifier for the 2015 European Curling Championships, however, lost in the best-of-three final to the Kyle Smith rink. Later on in the season, Team Brewster made two more tour finals at the Dumfries Challenger Series and the Aberdeen International Curling Championship where they lost to Bruce Mouat and David Murdoch respectively. The team was successful at the 2016 Scottish Men's Curling Championship, however, only losing one game en route to claiming the championship title. This earned them the right to represent Scotland at the 2016 World Men's Curling Championship, McMillan's first. There, the team finished with a 5–6 round robin record, placing seventh.

The following season, Team Brewster earned two titles at the 2016 Karuizawa International and the 2017 Perth Masters. They were also successful at the European qualifier, defeating Team Murdoch two games to nil to qualify. At the 2016 European Curling Championships, the team finished in sixth place with a 4–5 record. At the Scottish championship, they were not able to defend their title, losing in the 3 vs. 4 game to Bruce Mouat. Team Brewster concluded their season at the 2017 Humpty's Champions Cup where they finished with a 1–3 record. After the season, McMillan left the team to join the new Bruce Mouat rink with third Grant Hardie and second Bobby Lammie.

=== 2017–2022 ===
Team Mouat found immediate success to begin the 2017–18 season, going undefeated to claim the Stu Sells Oakville Tankard and the Oakville Fall Classic in back-to-back weeks. In both finals, the team beat the Kim Chang-min Korean rink. Later in the season, the Mouat rink would again beat Kim in another final, this time at the 2017 Boost National, the first Grand Slam event of the season. By winning the event, Team Mouat captured their first career Grand Slam title and became the second-ever non-Canadian team to win a men's Grand Slam event. The team followed this win with their fourth tour win of the season at the Dumfries Challenger Series back home in Scotland. In the new year, the team ran the table to win the 2018 Scottish Men's Curling Championship, defeating the Greg Drummond rink in the final. They then faced the Kyle Smith Olympic team in a best-of-three playoff to determine who would represent Scotland at the 2018 World Men's Curling Championship. Team Mouat won the series two games to one, earning the right to represent the country at the men's worlds. In preparation for the world championship, the team won another tour event at the Aberdeen International Curling Championship, defeating Yannick Schwaller in the final. At the world championship in Las Vegas, Nevada, the team lost just one game in the round robin to Sweden's Niklas Edin. Their 11–1 record earned them a direct bye to the semifinals where they suffered a 9–5 defeat to Canada's Brad Gushue. Despite this, they ended the week on a positive note with a dominant victory over Korea's Kim in the bronze medal game. The team ended the season at the 2018 Players' Championship and 2018 Humpty's Champions Cup Slam events where they reached the quarterfinals and semifinals respectively.

Team Mouat's first major bonspiel of the 2018–19 season came in September at the first leg of the Curling World Cup, where the team had a third-place finish. Two weeks later, they played in the 2018 Elite 10 Grand Slam event, where they won just one game. A month later, the team was more successful at the 2018 Masters Grand Slam, making it to the semifinals. A month later, they represented Scotland at the 2018 European Curling Championships. After finishing the round robin with a 7–2 record, the rink beat Italy's Joël Retornaz and Sweden's Niklas Edin in the semifinal and final to claim the gold medal. Team Mouat wrapped up the calendar year with another third-place finish at the second leg of the Curling World Cup and a second-place finish at the 2018 National. The National featured the first all-Scotland Grand Slam final as the Mouat rink faced Team Ross Paterson. The team began 2019 by winning the Mercure Perth Masters, followed by a quarterfinal finish at the 2019 Canadian Open. The team then returned to Scotland to defend their Scottish championship, which they won, sending them to the 2019 World Men's Curling Championship in Lethbridge, Alberta. There, the team had a slow 1–3 start, but they managed to turn things around to qualify with an 8–4 record. They then lost to Canada's Kevin Koe in the first playoff round. To wrap the season up, Team Mouat lost in a tiebreaker at the 2019 Players' Championship and made it to the semifinals at the 2019 Champions Cup.

The Mouat rink did not have a good start to the 2019–20 season as they failed to qualify as the Scottish representatives for the 2019 European Curling Championships. They found better luck in Grand Slam play, however, making it to the semifinals of the 2019 Masters and the 2019 National and the quarterfinals of the 2020 Canadian Open. The team won just one event on tour, defending their championship at the Mercure Perth Masters. In February, Team Mouat won the Scottish Men's Championship for a third year in a row. The team was set to represent Scotland at the 2020 World Men's Curling Championship on home soil in Glasgow before the event got cancelled due to the COVID-19 pandemic. The Scottish championship would be their last event of the season as both the Players' Championship and the Champions Cup Grand Slam events were also cancelled due to the pandemic.

For much of the 2020–21 season, there was no tour due to the pandemic, but Team Mouat won a series of domestic challenges put on by the British Curling Association. A "curling bubble" was set up in Calgary, Canada, in the Spring, which hosted several events, including the 2021 World Men's Curling Championship and two slams. The Mouat rink represented Scotland at the 2021 Worlds, finishing with a 9–4 round robin record. In the playoffs, they beat Canada, and RCF (Russia), making it to the final, where they lost to Sweden, skipped by Niklas Edin. A week later, Team Mouat played in the 2021 Champions Cup in the same bubble, winning the event, defeating Team Brendan Bottcher (who had been Team Canada at the Worlds) to claim their second career Slam title. The team continued their impressive run in the bubble during the next event, the 2021 Players' Championship. They would go through pool play as the only undefeated team on both the men's and women's sides with a 5–0 record, earning the team a bye to the semifinals. They continued their undefeated streak in the playoffs, winning the semis and the finals against Brad Gushue to win their second straight Slam title in just six days.

In October 2021, McMillan and his teammates were named to the 2022 British Olympic team. They had another stellar season in 2021–22, starting the year by winning the 2021 Stu Sells Oakville Tankard and then following it up with the 2021 Masters, their fourth Slam title. The team then made another final at the 2021 National which they lost to the Gushue rink. Next for the team was the 2021 European Curling Championships where the team had another dominant performance, winning all eleven of their games en route to another gold medal. At the Olympics, the Mouat rink finished in first place through the round robin with a strong 8–1 record. In the playoffs, they beat the defending champion John Shuster rink from the United States before losing the gold medal to Sweden, skipped by Niklas Edin. Team Mouat continued their success after the Olympics, winning their second slam of the season at the 2022 Players' Championship. The team was awarded the Pinty's Cup as the season's best Grand Slam team after their win. In their final event, Team Mouat faltered for the first time all season, failing to qualify for the playoffs at the 2022 Champions Cup.

=== 2022–present ===
The Scottish team had a slow start to the 2022–23 season, failing to qualify at the 2022 Baden Masters and the 2022 National. They turned things around at the 2022 Tour Challenge with a quarterfinal finish and later a semifinal appearance at the Swiss Cup Basel. At the 2022 European Curling Championships, the team succeeded in defending their title. After losing just one game to Switzerland's Yannick Schwaller in the round robin, Team Mouat got their revenge by defeating the Swiss 5–4 in the gold medal game. The next month, they made it to the final of the 2022 Masters where they lost to Joël Retornaz. In their next event, however, they defeated the Italians in the final of the 2023 Mercure Perth Masters. After a quarterfinal appearance at the 2023 Canadian Open, Team Mouat went undefeated to claim their fourth Scottish men's championship, defeating the James Craik junior rink in the final. At the 2023 World Men's Curling Championship, the team had a 10–2 round robin record, enough for a semifinal bye. After defeating Retornaz in an extra end, the team shot a 96 percent game in the final to down Canada's Gushue 9–3 and claim the gold medal. It was Scotland's first world men's title since David Murdoch won the event in 2009. After their world championship success, the team flamed out at both the 2023 Players' Championship and the 2023 Champions Cup, failing to qualify at both events.

After their dismal finish to the previous season, Team Mouat turned things around with a hot start to the 2023–24 season, winning the 2023 Euro Super Series and the 2023 Stu Sells Oakville Tankard. In both finals, the team beat Scottish rivals Team Ross Whyte. They faltered slightly by missing the playoffs at the 2023 Tour Challenge but got back on track with a quarterfinal finish at the 2023 National. Next for the team was the 2023 European Curling Championships where they finished second through the round robin with a 7–2 record. They then beat Switzerland's Schwaller in the semifinals before defeating Sweden's Edin 6–5 in an extra end for their fourth European title. In January, they defended their title at the 2024 Mercure Perth Masters by once again defeating the Whyte rink. After having limited success at the previous three Slams, Team Mouat claimed their sixth title with an undefeated run at the 2024 Canadian Open, defeating the Brendan Bottcher rink in the final. At the Scottish championship, the team could not defend their title as they lost out in the semifinal to Team Craik. Despite this, they were still chosen to represent Scotland at the 2024 World Men's Curling Championship over the Ross Whyte rink who had won the Scottish championship. Before Worlds, they claimed another tour title at the Aberdeen International Curling Championship. The team had a strong start to the world championship, finishing third overall with a 10–2 record. After defeating the United States in the first round, they lost both the semifinal and bronze medal game to Canada and Italy, failing to defend their title and finishing fourth. They ended the season with a semifinal finish at the 2024 Players' Championship.

Team Mouat started the 2024–25 season strong, winning the 2024 Tour Challenge over Gushue 10–3. The win gave the Mouat rink their first Tour Challenge win, and with it, Team Mouat had won a championship in each of the tour's five slams in their career. The Mouat rink continued their winning streak at the 2024 Canadian Open, again beating Gushue in the final 6–3, and going undefeated to win the title. Team Mouat would again represent Scotland at the 2024 European Curling Championships, where the team would go 8–1 in the round robin, but lose to Germany's Marc Muskatewitz 9–7 in the final. The Mouat rink would rebound quickly, winning their third straight 2024-25 Grand Slam title, this time defeating Brad Jacobs Alberta-based rink in the 2024 National final, 5–3. It was a career 9th Slam win for Team Mouat, who finished the event with a 6–1 record. Team Mouat would however lose their second-straight Scottish National Championship, losing to Ross Whyte in the final 8–3. However, as the current #1 ranked team in the world, Mouat was again selected by Scottish Curling to represent Scotland at the 2025 World Men's Curling Championship. At the 2025 Worlds, the Mouat rink made the most of their selection, winning their second World Championship title, beating Switzerland's Schwaller 5-4 in the final.

== Personal life ==
McMillan is employed as a curling development officer. He is the son of 1999 world champion Hammy McMillan. His cousin Grant Hardie plays on his team. His cousin Robyn Munro is his mixed doubles partner.

== Teams ==
| Season | Skip | Third | Second | Lead | Alternate |
|---|---|---|---|---|---|
| 2009–10 | Hammy McMillan | Rori Macpherson | Kyle Waddell | Craig Waddell | |
| 2010–11 | Hammy McMillan | Hammy McMillan | Ross Paterson | Sandy Gilmour | |
| 2011–12 | Blair Fraser | Thomas Sloan | Hammy McMillan | Struan Wood | |
| 2012–13 | Grant Hardie | Jay McWilliam | Hammy McMillan | Billy Morton | |
| 2013–14 | Grant Hardie | Jay McWilliam | Hammy McMillan | Billy Morton | |
| 2014–15 | Tom Brewster | Glen Muirhead | Ross Paterson | Hammy McMillan | Thomas Muirhead |
| 2015–16 | Tom Brewster | Glen Muirhead | Ross Paterson | Hammy McMillan | Scott Andrews (WMCC) |
| 2016–17 | Tom Brewster | Glen Muirhead | Ross Paterson | Hammy McMillan | Duncan Menzies (EuCC) |
| 2017–18 | Bruce Mouat | Grant Hardie | Bobby Lammie | Hammy McMillan | Ross Paterson (WMCC) |
| 2018–19 | Bruce Mouat | Grant Hardie | Bobby Lammie | Hammy McMillan | Ross Whyte |
| 2019–20 | Bruce Mouat | Grant Hardie | Bobby Lammie | Hammy McMillan | Ross Whyte |
| 2020–21 | Bruce Mouat | Grant Hardie | Bobby Lammie | Hammy McMillan | Ross Whyte |
| 2021–22 | Bruce Mouat | Grant Hardie | Bobby Lammie | Hammy McMillan | Ross Whyte |
| 2022–23 | Bruce Mouat | Grant Hardie | Bobby Lammie | Hammy McMillan | Kyle Waddell |
| 2023–24 | Bruce Mouat | Grant Hardie | Bobby Lammie | Hammy McMillan | Kyle Waddell |
| 2024–25 | Bruce Mouat | Grant Hardie | Bobby Lammie | Hammy McMillan | Kyle Waddell |
| 2025–26 | Bruce Mouat | Grant Hardie | Bobby Lammie | Hammy McMillan | Kyle Waddell |
| 2026–27 | Bruce Mouat | Robin Brydone | Bobby Lammie | Hammy McMillan Jr. | |
