= Dumfries Challenger Series =

World Curling Tour event in Scotland

The Dumfries Challenger Series is an annual bonspiel (curling tournament) on the men's World Curling Tour (WCT), held at the Dumfries Ice Bowl in Dumfries, Scotland. It has been part of the WCT since 2014. The event was known as the Dumfries Curling Challenge in 2014 and the LELY Dumfries Challenger Series in 2015.

== Past champions ==
Year	Winning team	Runner up team	Purse
2014	(Scotland) Tom Brewster, Glen Muirhead, Ross Paterson, Hammy McMillan Jr.	(Scotland) Kyle Smith, Grant Hardie, Kyle Waddell, Cammy Smith	£12,000
2015	(Scotland) Bruce Mouat, Duncan Menzies, Bobby Lammie, Gregor Cannon	(Scotland) Tom Brewster, Glen Muirhead, Ross Paterson, Hammy McMillan Jr.	£7,000
2016	(Scotland) Kyle Smith, Thomas Muirhead, Kyle Waddell, Cammy Smith	(Scotland) Cameron Bryce, Robin Brydone, Euan Kyle, Frazer Shaw	£7,500
2017	(Scotland) Bruce Mouat, Grant Hardie, Bobby Lammie, Hammy McMillan Jr.	(Switzerland) Jan Hess, Simon Gloor, Simon Höhn, Reto Schönenberger	£7,500
2018	(Netherlands) Wouter Gösgens (Fourth), Jaap van Dorp (skip), Laurens Hoekman, Carlo Glasbergen	(Switzerland) Lucien Lottenbach, Rainer Kobler, Patrick Abacherli, Tom Winkelhausen	£7,500
2019	(Scotland) Ross Whyte, Robin Brydone, Duncan McFadzean, Euan Kyle	(Switzerland) Lucien Lottenbach, Rainer Kobler, Patrick Abacherli, Tom Winkelhausen	£7,500
2020	Cancelled		
