= Ross Paterson =

Scottish curler

- Curler
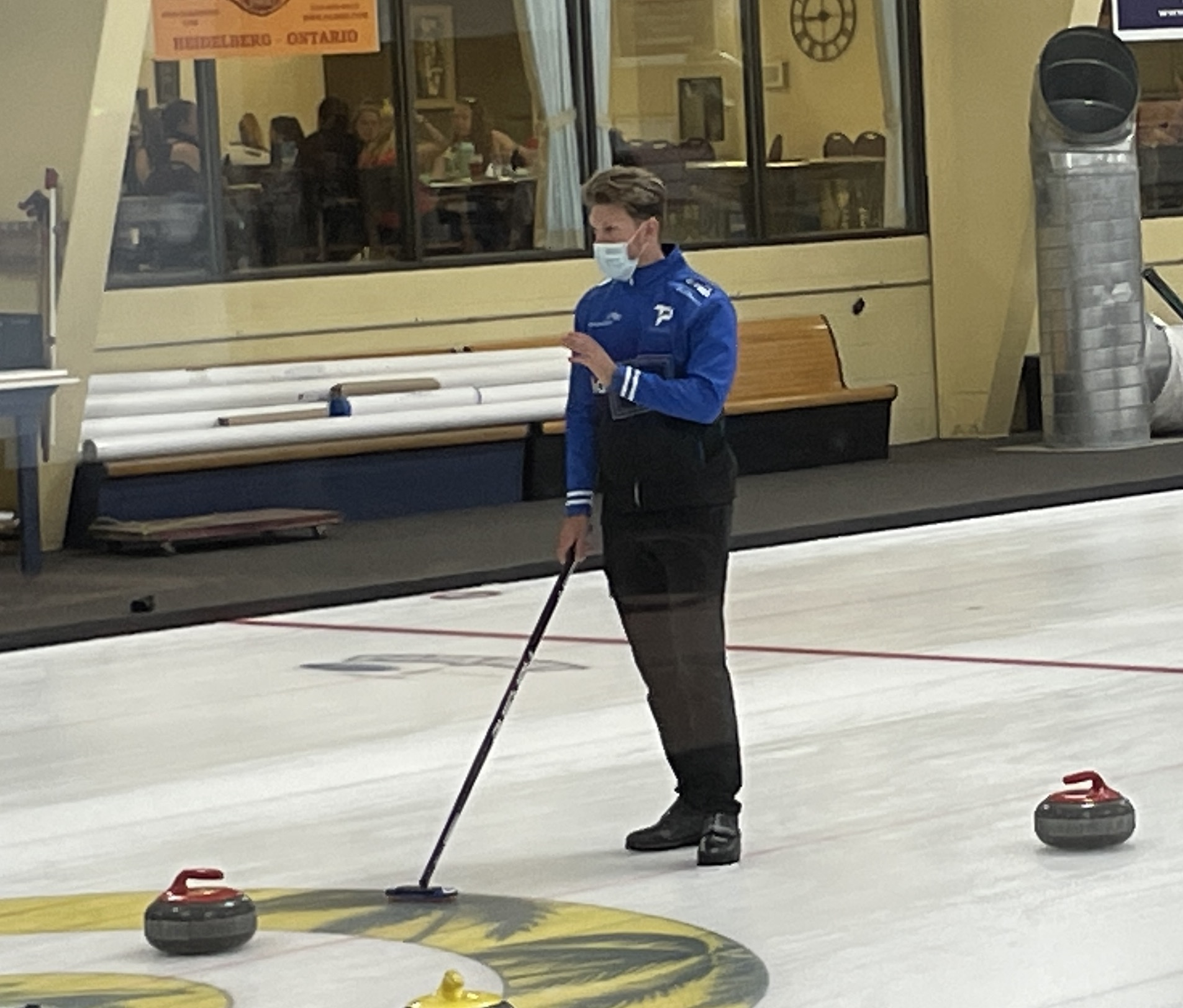
- Paterson at the 2021 KW Fall Classic
- Born: 13 March 1984 (age 42)

Team
- Curling club: Cadder Curling Club, Hamilton, SCO

Curling career
- Member Association: Scotland; Great Britain
- World Championship: 4 (2016, 2017, 2018, 2022)
- European Championship: 4 (2010, 2011, 2016, 2019)
- Grand Slam victories: 1 (2018 National)
Medal record
Men's curling
Representing Scotland
World Championships
Bronze medal – third place	2018 Las Vegas
European Championships
Bronze medal – third place	2019 Helsingborg
World Junior Championships
Bronze medal – third place	2005 Pinerolo
Representing Great Britain
Winter Universiade
Silver medal – second place	2007 Pinerolo

Ross Paterson (born 13 March 1984) is a retired Scottish curler from Glasgow. During his career, he represented Scotland at four World Men's Curling Championships and four European Curling Championships, winning a bronze medal at both the 2018 World Men's Curling Championship and the 2019 European Curling Championships. He also won silver at the 2007 Winter Universiade and bronze at the 2005 World Junior Curling Championships in his junior career. In 2018, he skipped his team to victory at the 2018 National Grand Slam of Curling event. He is a two-time champion at the Scottish Men's Curling Championship, winning the title in both 2016 and 2022.

== Career ==
=== Juniors ===
Paterson represented Scotland at the 2005 World Junior Curling Championships, playing third for the Logan Gray rink. After finishing the round robin with an undefeated 9–0 record, they lost in the semifinal against Canada, and settled for a bronze medal, after defeating the United States in the bronze medal game.

Paterson was the alternate on the British team skipped by John Hamilton at the 2007 Winter Universiade. Paterson did not play in any games, but won a silver medal as a member of the team.

=== Men's ===
Paterson won his first World Curling Tour event at the 2006 Mercure Perth Masters, playing for the David Edwards rink. Paterson would later join the Hammy McMillan rink, playing second. The team played in the 2010 European Curling Championships, finishing in fifth place. In 2011, Paterson joined David Murdoch's rink at second, and finished fifth once again at the 2011 European Curling Championships.

Paterson played for Logan Gray once again, for two seasons between 2012 and 2014. In 2014, he won the Perth Masters once again as a member of the team.

In 2014, Paterson joined the Tom Brewster rink. The team won three events in their first season together, the Swiss Cup Basel, the Curling Masters Champery and the Dumfries Curling Challenge. They would miss out on the playoffs at the 2015 Scottish Men's Curling Championship, finishing with a 4–5 record.

Team Brewster had a strong tour season during the 2015–16 season, beginning at the Baden Masters where they lost in the final to Sweden's Niklas Edin. They next played in the 2015 GSOC Tour Challenge Tier 2 event where they made it to the semifinals, losing out to Mark Kean. The team played in the qualifier for the 2015 European Curling Championships, however, lost in the best-of-three final to the Kyle Smith rink. Later on in the season, Team Brewster made two more tour finals at the Dumfries Challenger Series and the Aberdeen International Curling Championship where they lost to Bruce Mouat and David Murdoch respectively. The team was successful at the 2016 Scottish Men's Curling Championship, however, only losing one game en route to claiming the championship title. This earned them the right to represent Scotland at the 2016 World Men's Curling Championship, Paterson's first. There, the team finished with a 5–6 round robin record, placing seventh.

The following season, Team Brewster earned two titles at the 2016 Karuizawa International and the 2017 Perth Masters. They were also successful at the European qualifier, going on to represent Scotland at the 2016 European Curling Championships where they finished in sixth place. Team Brewster concluded their season at the 2017 Humpty's Champions Cup where they finished with a 1–3 record. Also during the 2016–17 season, Paterson joined the David Murdoch rink as their alternate for the 2017 World Men's Curling Championship after losing to them in the Scottish Championship. They finished in sixth place with a 6–5 record, though Paterson himself did not play in any games.

Paterson joined the Greg Drummond rink for the 2017–18 season as Drummond's third. In their one season together, the team, consisting of Paterson, Drummond, Gregor Cannon and Michael Goodfellow finished runner-up at the Curling Masters Champéry and reached the semifinals of both the AMJ Campbell Shorty Jenkins Classic as well as the Qinghai International. They competed in two slams, missing the playoffs at both the 2017 GSOC Tour Challenge Tier 2 and the 2017 Boost National. They would finish second at the Scottish Championship after losing to the Bruce Mouat rink in the final. Paterson would, however, join the Mouat rink at the 2018 World Men's Curling Championship, where they won a bronze medal.

For the 2018–19 season, Paterson formed his own rink with Kyle Waddell, Duncan Menzies and Michael Goodfellow. The team had a successful first season on tour. In their first few events together, they reached the semifinals of the AMJ Campbell Shorty Jenkins Classic and the Red Deer Curling Classic as well as the final of the Ashley HomeStore Curling Classic where they were defeated by the Glen Muirhead rink in an all-Scottish final. Team Paterson played in six of the seven Grand Slam events during the season, finding the most success at the 2018 National where they defeated Team Bruce Mouat in the final, in the first all-Scotland Grand Slam final. They also made the playoffs at two other Slams, reaching the semifinals of the 2019 Players' Championship and the quarterfinals of the 2018 Masters. At the Scottish Championship, the team finished in third place after losing in the semifinal to the Muirhead rink. Team Paterson were selected to represented Scotland at the third leg of the 2018–19 Curling World Cup. There, they finished in third place after finishing the round robin with a 5–1 record. They also qualified for the grand final of the Curling World Cup, where they again finished in third.

In their second season together, the Paterson rink found more success on tour, making the finals of both the Swiss Cup Basel and the Aberdeen International Curling Championship. In October, they defeated both the Mouat and Muirhead rinks to earn the right to represent Scotland at the 2019 European Curling Championships. There, Paterson guided his team to a 5–4 round robin record, enough to qualify for the playoffs. They then lost to Sweden in the semifinal before defeating Denmark to claim the bronze medal. In Grand Slam play, the team played in three events, only making the playoffs at the 2019 Masters. They finished third at the Scottish championship.

Due to the COVID-19 pandemic, there were a limited number of tour events held during the 2020–21 season. Team Paterson did play in a series of domestic events put on by the British Curling Association, finishing third at all three events hosted. After the season, Michael Goodfellow retired from competitive curling and Craig Waddell joined the team as their new lead.

During the 2021–22 season, Team Paterson reached the finals of the KW Fall Classic where they were beaten by the Ross Whyte rink. They played in two Grand Slams, finishing winless at both the 2021 Masters and the 2021 National. In February, the team went 8–2 during the round robin at the 2022 Scottish Curling Championships and later defeated the Whyte rink in the championship final. They were also picked to represent Scotland at the 2022 World Men's Curling Championship after being selected over the Bruce Mouat rink that won silver at the 2022 Winter Olympics, a decision that caused controversy due to how it was handled. For the championship, the team altered their lineup, with Kyle Waddell being named as the team's skip while Paterson continued to throw fourth stones. At the Worlds, the team qualified for the playoffs with a 7–5 record. They then lost in the qualification game to the United States' Korey Dropkin, settling for fifth place.

On 29 June 2022 Paterson announced his retirement from elite level curling.

== Coaching ==
Paterson currently coaches the Scottish national women's team.

== Personal life ==
Prior to becoming a full-time curler, Paterson was a council officer in East Dunbartonshire.

== Grand Slam record ==
Key
C	Champion
F	Lost in Final
SF	Lost in Semifinal
QF	Lost in Quarterfinals
R16	Lost in the round of 16
Q	Did not advance to playoffs
T2	Played in Tier 2 event
DNP	Did not participate in event
N/A	Not a Grand Slam event that season

Event	2015–16	2016–17	2017–18	2018–19	2019–20	2020–21	2021–22
Elite 10	DNP	DNP	DNP	Q	N/A	N/A	N/A
Masters	DNP	DNP	DNP	QF	QF	N/A	Q
Tour Challenge	T2	T2	T2	Q	DNP	N/A	N/A
The National	DNP	DNP	Q	C	Q	N/A	Q
Canadian Open	DNP	DNP	DNP	DNP	Q	N/A	N/A
Players'	DNP	DNP	DNP	SF	N/A	DNP	DNP
Champions Cup	DNP	Q	DNP	Q	N/A	DNP	DNP

== Teams ==
Season	Skip	Third	Second	Lead
2004–05	Logan Gray	Ross Paterson	Sandy Gilmour	Graeme Copland
2006–07	Dave Edwards	Paul Westwood	Ross Paterson	Sandy Gilmour
2008–09	Hammy McMillan	Philip Wilson	Ross Paterson	Sandy Gilmour
2009–10	Hammy McMillan	Philip Wilson	Ross Paterson	Sandy Gilmour
2010–11	Hammy McMillan	Dave Smith	Ross Paterson	Sandy Gilmour
2011–12	David Murdoch	Glen Muirhead	Ross Paterson	Richard Woods
2012–13	Logan Gray	Ross Paterson	Alasdair Guthtrie	Richard Woods
2013–14	Logan Gray	Ross Paterson	Alasdair Guthtrie	Richard Woods
2014–15	Tom Brewster	Glen Muirhead	Ross Paterson	Hammy McMillan Jr.
2015–16	Tom Brewster	Glen Muirhead	Ross Paterson	Hammy McMillan Jr.
2016–17	Tom Brewster	Glen Muirhead	Ross Paterson	Hammy McMillan Jr.
2017–18	Greg Drummond	Ross Paterson	Gregor Cannon	Michael Goodfellow
2018–19	Ross Paterson	Kyle Waddell	Duncan Menzies	Michael Goodfellow
2019–20	Ross Paterson	Kyle Waddell	Duncan Menzies	Michael Goodfellow
2020–21	Ross Paterson	Kyle Waddell	Duncan Menzies	Michael Goodfellow
2021–22	Ross Paterson	Kyle Waddell	Duncan Menzies	Craig Waddell
