= 2021 National =

Grand Slam of Curling event

2021 BOOST National
- Host city: Chestermere, Alberta
- Arena: Chestermere Recreation Centre
- Dates: November 2–7
- Men's winner: (Newfoundland and Labrador) Team Gushue
- Curling club: St. John's CC, St. John's
- Skip: Brad Gushue
- Third: Mark Nichols
- Second: Brett Gallant
- Lead: Geoff Walker
- Coach: Jules Owchar
- Finalist: (Scotland) Bruce Mouat
- Women's winner: (Sweden) Team Hasselborg
- Curling club: Sundbybergs CK, Sundbyberg
- Skip: Anna Hasselborg
- Third: Sara McManus
- Second: Agnes Knochenhauer
- Lead: Sofia Mabergs
- Coach: Wayne Middaugh
- Finalist: (Manitoba) Tracy Fleury

The 2021 BOOST National was held November 2 to 7 at the Chestermere Recreation Centre in Chestermere, Alberta. It was the second Grand Slam and second major of the 2021–22 curling season.

== Qualification ==
The top 16 ranked men's and women's teams on the World Curling Federation's world team rankings qualified for the event. In the event that a team declines their invitation, the next-ranked team on the world team ranking is invited until the field is complete.

=== Men ===
Top world team ranking men's teams:

1. (Ontario) Brad Jacobs
2. (Ontario) John Epping
3. (Scotland) Bruce Mouat
4. (Manitoba) Mike McEwen
5. (Alberta) Brendan Bottcher
6. (Newfoundland and Labrador) Brad Gushue
7. (Saskatchewan) Matt Dunstone
8. (Alberta) Kevin Koe
9. (Switzerland) Yannick Schwaller
10. (Switzerland) Peter de Cruz
11. (Scotland) Ross Whyte
12. (Scotland) Ross Paterson
13. (Sweden) Niklas Edin
14. (Manitoba) Jason Gunnlaugson
15. (United States) ~~Rich Ruohonen~~
16. (Manitoba) Braden Calvert
17. (Ontario) Glenn Howard

=== Women ===
Top world team ranking women's teams:

1. (Sweden) Anna Hasselborg
2. (Manitoba) Kerri Einarson
3. (Manitoba) Tracy Fleury
4. (Scotland) ~~Eve Muirhead~~
5. (Manitoba) Jennifer Jones
6. (Switzerland) Silvana Tirinzoni
7. (Ontario) Rachel Homan
8. (Japan) Satsuki Fujisawa
9. (South Korea) ~~Kim Eun-jung~~
10. (Russia) Alina Kovaleva
11. (Alberta) Laura Walker
12. (South Korea) Kim Min-ji
13. (Alberta) Kelsey Rocque
14. (Sweden) Isabella Wranå
15. (South Korea) Gim Un-chi
16. (United States) ~~Tabitha Peterson~~
17. (Switzerland) Irene Schori
18. (Ontario) Hollie Duncan
19. (British Columbia) Corryn Brown

== Men ==
=== Teams ===
The teams are listed as follows:

Skip	Third	Second	Lead	Locale
Brendan Bottcher	Darren Moulding	Brad Thiessen	Karrick Martin	Edmonton, Alberta
Braden Calvert	Kyle Kurz	Ian McMillan	Rob Gordon	Winnipeg, Manitoba
Benoît Schwarz (Fourth)	Sven Michel	Peter de Cruz (Skip)	Valentin Tanner	Geneva, Switzerland
Matt Dunstone	Tyler Tardi (Note: Tyler Tardi replaced Braeden Moskowy at third.)	Kirk Muyres	Dustin Kidby	Regina, Saskatchewan
Niklas Edin	Oskar Eriksson	Rasmus Wranå	Christoffer Sundgren	Karlstad, Sweden
John Epping	Ryan Fry	Mat Camm (Note: Mat Camm and Brent Laing switched positions for their last game of the event.)	Brent Laing	Toronto, Ontario
Jason Gunnlaugson	Adam Casey	Matt Wozniak	Connor Njegovan	Morris, Manitoba
Brad Gushue	Mark Nichols	Brett Gallant	Geoff Walker	St. John's, Newfoundland and Labrador
Glenn Howard	Scott Howard	David Mathers	Tim March	Penetanguishene, Ontario
Brad Jacobs	Marc Kennedy	E. J. Harnden	Ryan Harnden	Sault Ste. Marie, Ontario
Kevin Koe	B. J. Neufeld	John Morris	Ben Hebert	Calgary, Alberta
Mike McEwen	Reid Carruthers	Derek Samagalski	Colin Hodgson	West St. Paul, Manitoba
Bruce Mouat	Grant Hardie	Bobby Lammie	Hammy McMillan Jr.	Stirling, Scotland
Ross Paterson	Kyle Waddell	Duncan Menzies	Craig Waddell	Glasgow, Scotland
Yannick Schwaller	Michael Brunner	Romano Meier	Marcel Käufeler	Bern, Switzerland
Ross Whyte	Robin Brydone	Duncan McFadzean	Euan Kyle	Stirling, Scotland

=== Knockout brackets ===
==== A event ====
A Event	Qualifier 1
1	(Ontario) Brad Jacobs	6
1	(Manitoba) Braden Calvert	4	9	(Ontario) Brad Jacobs	2
2	(Manitoba) Mike McEwen	3	9	(Switzerland) Peter de Cruz	7
2	(Switzerland) Peter de Cruz	4	13	(Switzerland) Peter de Cruz	3
3	(Sweden) Niklas Edin	7	13	(Sweden) Niklas Edin	7
3	(Scotland) Ross Whyte	4	10	(Sweden) Niklas Edin	6
4	(Ontario) John Epping	1	10	(Ontario) Glenn Howard	5
4	(Ontario) Glenn Howard	6

A Event	Qualifier 2
5	(Scotland) Bruce Mouat	5
5	(Scotland) Ross Paterson	4	11	(Scotland) Bruce Mouat	6
6	(Alberta) Brendan Bottcher	1	11	(Switzerland) Yannick Schwaller	5
6	(Switzerland) Yannick Schwaller	10	14	(Scotland) Bruce Mouat	6
7	(Newfoundland and Labrador) Brad Gushue	5	14	(Newfoundland and Labrador) Brad Gushue	8
7	(Manitoba) Jason Gunnlaugson	4	12	(Newfoundland and Labrador) Brad Gushue	8
8	(Alberta) Kevin Koe	7	12	(Saskatchewan) Matt Dunstone	2
8	(Saskatchewan) Matt Dunstone	8

==== B event ====
B Event						Qualifier 3
15	(Manitoba) Braden Calvert	6
15	(Manitoba) Mike McEwen	3	19	(Manitoba) Braden Calvert	6
16	(Scotland) Ross Whyte	7	19	(Scotland) Ross Whyte	7
16	(Ontario) John Epping	5				23	(Scotland) Ross Whyte	2
						23	(Scotland) Bruce Mouat	8

B Event						Qualifier 4
17	(Scotland) Ross Paterson	4
17	(Alberta) Brendan Bottcher	5	20	(Alberta) Brendan Bottcher	4
18	(Manitoba) Jason Gunnlaugson	1	20	(Alberta) Kevin Koe	6
18	(Alberta) Kevin Koe	7				24	(Alberta) Kevin Koe	6
						24	(Switzerland) Peter de Cruz	5

B Event			Qualifier 5
21	(Ontario) Brad Jacobs	4
21	(Ontario) Glenn Howard	6	25	(Ontario) Glenn Howard	2
22	(Switzerland) Yannick Schwaller	2	25	(Saskatchewan) Matt Dunstone	7
22	(Saskatchewan) Matt Dunstone	3

==== C event ====
C Event						Qualifier 6
26	(Manitoba) Mike McEwen	4
26	(Ontario) John Epping	1	28	(Manitoba) Mike McEwen	4
			28	(Ontario) Brad Jacobs	3
						31	(Manitoba) Mike McEwen	1
						31	(Switzerland) Peter de Cruz	7

C Event						Qualifier 7
27	(Scotland) Ross Paterson	4
27	(Manitoba) Jason Gunnlaugson	5	29	(Manitoba) Jason Gunnlaugson	6
			29	(Switzerland) Yannick Schwaller	7
						32	(Switzerland) Yannick Schwaller	4
						32	(Scotland) Ross Whyte	7

C Event			Qualifier 8
30	(Manitoba) Braden Calvert	4
30	(Alberta) Brendan Bottcher	5	33	(Alberta) Brendan Bottcher	7
			33	(Ontario) Glenn Howard	1

=== Knockout results ===
All draw times are listed in Mountain Time (UTC−06:00).

==== Draw 1 ====
Tuesday, November 2, 8:00 am

Sheet A	1	2	3	4	5	6	7	8	9	Final
(Ontario) Brad Jacobs	0	0	0	2	0	0	2	0	2	6
(Manitoba) Braden Calvert 🔨	0	0	2	0	0	1	0	1	0	4

Sheet B	1	2	3	4	5	6	7	8	9	Final
(Manitoba) Mike McEwen 🔨	1	0	1	0	0	0	0	1	0	3
(Switzerland) Peter de Cruz	0	1	0	1	0	1	0	0	1	4

Sheet C	1	2	3	4	5	6	7	8	Final
(Newfoundland and Labrador) Brad Gushue 🔨	1	2	0	0	0	1	0	1	5
(Manitoba) Jason Gunnlaugson	0	0	1	1	1	0	1	0	4

Sheet D	1	2	3	4	5	6	7	8	Final
(Scotland) Bruce Mouat 🔨	3	0	1	0	0	0	0	1	5
(Scotland) Ross Paterson	0	2	0	0	0	1	1	0	4

==== Draw 2 ====
Tuesday, November 2, 11:30 am

Sheet A	1	2	3	4	5	6	7	8	Final
(Sweden) Niklas Edin	0	1	0	0	3	3	0	X	7
(Scotland) Ross Whyte 🔨	1	0	0	2	0	0	1	X	4

Sheet B	1	2	3	4	5	6	7	8	Final
(Ontario) John Epping	0	1	0	0	0	0	X	X	1
(Ontario) Glenn Howard 🔨	2	0	0	2	1	1	X	X	6

Sheet D	1	2	3	4	5	6	7	8	Final
(Alberta) Brendan Bottcher	0	1	0	0	0	X	X	X	1
(Switzerland) Yannick Schwaller 🔨	4	0	1	3	2	X	X	X	10

==== Draw 3 ====
Tuesday, November 2, 3:00 pm

Sheet C	1	2	3	4	5	6	7	8	Final
(Alberta) Kevin Koe	0	2	2	0	2	0	1	0	7
(Saskatchewan) Matt Dunstone 🔨	3	0	0	1	0	1	0	3	8

==== Draw 5 ====
Wednesday, November 3, 8:00 am

Sheet A	1	2	3	4	5	6	7	8	Final
(Scotland) Ross Paterson	0	0	0	2	0	1	1	0	4
(Alberta) Brendan Bottcher 🔨	0	0	2	0	2	0	0	1	5

Sheet C	1	2	3	4	5	6	7	8	Final
(Scotland) Ross Whyte 🔨	1	0	1	0	2	0	3	0	7
(Ontario) John Epping	0	1	0	2	0	1	0	1	5

Sheet D	1	2	3	4	5	6	7	8	Final
(Sweden) Niklas Edin	0	2	0	2	1	0	0	1	6
(Ontario) Glenn Howard 🔨	1	0	2	0	0	2	0	0	5

==== Draw 6 ====
Wednesday, November 3, 12:00 pm

Sheet A	1	2	3	4	5	6	7	8	Final
(Newfoundland and Labrador) Brad Gushue 🔨	2	0	2	0	3	1	X	X	8
(Saskatchewan) Matt Dunstone	0	1	0	1	0	0	X	X	2

Sheet B	1	2	3	4	5	6	7	8	Final
(Manitoba) Jason Gunnlaugson	0	0	1	0	0	X	X	X	1
(Alberta) Kevin Koe 🔨	2	2	0	2	1	X	X	X	7

Sheet C	1	2	3	4	5	6	7	8	Final
(Manitoba) Braden Calvert	0	1	0	4	1	0	X	X	6
(Manitoba) Mike McEwen 🔨	0	0	1	0	0	2	X	X	3

Sheet D	1	2	3	4	5	6	7	8	Final
(Ontario) Brad Jacobs	0	0	0	2	0	0	0	X	2
(Switzerland) Peter de Cruz 🔨	1	0	1	0	1	3	1	X	7

==== Draw 7 ====
Wednesday, November 3, 4:00 pm

Sheet A	1	2	3	4	5	6	7	8	Final
(Scotland) Bruce Mouat 🔨	2	0	1	0	0	3	0	0	6
(Switzerland) Yannick Schwaller	0	1	0	1	0	0	2	1	5

==== Draw 9 ====
Thursday, November 4, 8:00 am

Sheet A	1	2	3	4	5	6	7	8	9	Final
(Manitoba) Braden Calvert	0	3	0	0	1	1	0	1	0	6
(Scotland) Ross Whyte 🔨	1	0	0	3	0	0	2	0	1	7

Sheet B	1	2	3	4	5	6	7	8	Final
(Switzerland) Yannick Schwaller 🔨	0	0	0	0	0	1	1	0	2
(Saskatchewan) Matt Dunstone	1	0	0	1	0	0	0	1	3

Sheet C	1	2	3	4	5	6	7	8	Final
(Ontario) Brad Jacobs 🔨	0	0	2	0	0	0	2	0	4
(Ontario) Glenn Howard	0	0	0	3	1	1	0	1	6

Sheet D	1	2	3	4	5	6	7	8	Final
(Alberta) Brendan Bottcher 🔨	1	0	0	1	0	1	1	0	4
(Alberta) Kevin Koe	0	1	0	0	4	0	0	1	6

==== Draw 11 ====
Thursday, November 4, 4:00 pm

Sheet A	1	2	3	4	5	6	7	8	Final
(Manitoba) Mike McEwen 🔨	2	0	0	0	0	1	1	X	4
(Ontario) John Epping	0	1	0	0	0	0	0	X	1

Sheet B	1	2	3	4	5	6	7	8	Final
(Scotland) Bruce Mouat	0	3	1	0	1	0	1	0	6
(Newfoundland and Labrador) Brad Gushue 🔨	3	0	0	2	0	2	0	1	8

Sheet C	1	2	3	4	5	6	7	8	Final
(Switzerland) Peter de Cruz	0	0	1	0	2	0	0	X	3
(Sweden) Niklas Edin 🔨	0	1	0	2	0	0	4	X	7

Sheet D	1	2	3	4	5	6	7	8	Final
(Scotland) Ross Paterson 🔨	0	2	0	0	1	0	1	X	4
(Manitoba) Jason Gunnlaugson	1	0	1	1	0	2	0	X	5

==== Draw 13 ====
Friday, November 5, 8:00 am

Sheet B	1	2	3	4	5	6	7	8	9	Final
(Manitoba) Mike McEwen 🔨	0	1	0	1	0	1	0	0	1	4
(Ontario) Brad Jacobs	0	0	1	0	1	0	0	1	0	3

Sheet C	1	2	3	4	5	6	7	8	Final
(Manitoba) Jason Gunnlaugson 🔨	0	2	0	1	0	1	2	0	6
(Switzerland) Yannick Schwaller	2	0	1	0	3	0	0	1	7

==== Draw 15 ====
Friday, November 5, 4:00 pm

Sheet A	1	2	3	4	5	6	7	8	Final
(Ontario) Glenn Howard	0	0	2	0	0	0	X	X	2
(Saskatchewan) Matt Dunstone 🔨	0	1	0	3	2	1	X	X	7

Sheet B	1	2	3	4	5	6	7	8	Final
(Alberta) Kevin Koe	0	2	0	1	0	3	0	0	6
(Switzerland) Peter de Cruz 🔨	1	0	0	0	2	0	1	1	5

Sheet C	1	2	3	4	5	6	7	8	9	Final
(Manitoba) Braden Calvert 🔨	1	0	0	0	1	0	0	2	0	4
(Alberta) Brendan Bottcher	0	0	0	2	0	0	2	0	1	5

Sheet D	1	2	3	4	5	6	7	8	Final
(Scotland) Ross Whyte	0	2	0	0	0	X	X	X	2
(Scotland) Bruce Mouat 🔨	2	0	2	1	3	X	X	X	8

==== Draw 17 ====
Saturday, November 6, 8:00 am

Sheet B	1	2	3	4	5	6	7	8	Final
(Switzerland) Yannick Schwaller	0	0	2	0	2	0	0	X	4
(Scotland) Ross Whyte 🔨	0	2	0	2	0	2	1	X	7

Sheet C	1	2	3	4	5	6	7	8	Final
(Manitoba) Mike McEwen	0	0	0	1	0	X	X	X	1
(Switzerland) Peter de Cruz 🔨	4	0	0	0	3	X	X	X	7

Sheet D	1	2	3	4	5	6	7	8	Final
(Alberta) Brendan Bottcher 🔨	0	2	1	3	1	X	X	X	7
(Ontario) Glenn Howard	1	0	0	0	0	X	X	X	1

=== Playoffs ===
Quarterfinals
A2	(Newfoundland and Labrador) Brad Gushue	6
C2	(Scotland) Ross Whyte	3
B2	(Alberta) Kevin Koe	8
B3	(Saskatchewan) Matt Dunstone	3
A1	(Sweden) Niklas Edin	2
C1	(Switzerland) Peter de Cruz	4
B1	(Scotland) Bruce Mouat	8
C3	(Alberta) Brendan Bottcher	2

Semifinals
A2	(Newfoundland and Labrador) Brad Gushue	5
B2	(Alberta) Kevin Koe	2
C1	(Switzerland) Peter de Cruz	2
B1	(Scotland) Bruce Mouat	7

Final
A2	(Newfoundland and Labrador) Brad Gushue	5
B1	(Scotland) Bruce Mouat	2

==== Quarterfinals ====
Saturday, November 6, 4:00 pm

Sheet A	1	2	3	4	5	6	7	8	Final
(Scotland) Bruce Mouat 🔨	2	0	3	0	1	2	X	X	8
(Alberta) Brendan Bottcher	0	1	0	1	0	0	X	X	2

Player percentages
(Scotland) Team Mouat		(Alberta) Team Bottcher	
Hammy McMillan Jr.	98%	Karrick Martin	79%
Bobby Lammie	81%	Brad Thiessen	90%
Grant Hardie	85%	Darren Moulding	92%
Bruce Mouat	88%	Brendan Bottcher	73%
Total	88%	Total	83%

Sheet B	1	2	3	4	5	6	7	8	Final
(Alberta) Kevin Koe 🔨	3	0	2	1	0	2	X	X	8
(Saskatchewan) Matt Dunstone	0	2	0	0	1	0	X	X	3

Player percentages
(Alberta) Team Koe		(Saskatchewan) Team Dunstone	
Ben Hebert	81%	Dustin Kidby	94%
John Morris	81%	Kirk Muyres	92%
B. J. Neufeld	83%	Tyler Tardi	56%
Kevin Koe	85%	Matt Dunstone	71%
Total	83%	Total	78%

Sheet C	1	2	3	4	5	6	7	8	Final
(Newfoundland and Labrador) Brad Gushue 🔨	1	0	1	0	3	0	1	X	6
(Scotland) Ross Whyte	0	0	0	2	0	1	0	X	3

Player percentages
(Newfoundland and Labrador) Team Gushue		(Scotland) Team Whyte	
Geoff Walker	81%	Euan Kyle	92%
Brett Gallant	88%	Duncan McFadzean	84%
Mark Nichols	95%	Robin Brydone	75%
Brad Gushue	80%	Ross Whyte	84%
Total	86%	Total	84%

Sheet D	1	2	3	4	5	6	7	8	Final
(Sweden) Niklas Edin 🔨	0	1	0	0	0	0	1	0	2
(Switzerland) Peter de Cruz	0	0	0	1	2	1	0	0	4

Player percentages
(Sweden) Team Edin		(Switzerland) Team de Cruz	
Christoffer Sundgren	95%	Valentin Tanner	98%
Rasmus Wranå	81%	Peter de Cruz	92%
Oskar Eriksson	83%	Sven Michel	97%
Niklas Edin	73%	Peter de Cruz	89%
Total	83%	Total	94%

==== Semifinals ====
Saturday, November 6, 8:00 pm

Sheet B	1	2	3	4	5	6	7	8	Final
(Switzerland) Peter de Cruz	0	1	0	1	0	0	0	X	2
(Scotland) Bruce Mouat 🔨	3	0	2	0	0	0	2	X	7

Player percentages
(Switzerland) Team de Cruz		(Scotland) Team Mouat	
Valentin Tanner	98%	Hammy McMillan Jr.	71%
Peter de Cruz	96%	Bobby Lammie	89%
Sven Michel	95%	Grant Hardie	80%
Peter de Cruz	80%	Bruce Mouat	94%
Total	92%	Total	84%

Sheet D	1	2	3	4	5	6	7	8	Final
(Newfoundland and Labrador) Brad Gushue 🔨	0	0	1	1	1	0	1	1	5
(Alberta) Kevin Koe	0	1	0	0	0	1	0	0	2

Player percentages
(Newfoundland and Labrador) Team Gushue		(Alberta) Team Koe	
Geoff Walker	94%	Ben Hebert	94%
Brett Gallant	88%	John Morris	66%
Mark Nichols	94%	B. J. Neufeld	78%
Brad Gushue	83%	Kevin Koe	81%
Total	90%	Total	80%

==== Final ====
Sunday, November 7, 10:00 am

Sheet C	1	2	3	4	5	6	7	8	Final
(Newfoundland and Labrador) Brad Gushue 🔨	0	1	0	0	0	2	0	2	5
(Scotland) Bruce Mouat	0	0	0	0	1	0	1	0	2

Player percentages
(Newfoundland and Labrador) Team Gushue		(Scotland) Team Mouat	
Geoff Walker	100%	Hammy McMillan Jr.	97%
Brett Gallant	92%	Bobby Lammie	98%
Mark Nichols	94%	Grant Hardie	97%
Brad Gushue	94%	Bruce Mouat	91%
Total	95%	Total	96%

== Women ==
=== Teams ===
The teams are listed as follows:

Skip	Third	Second	Lead	Alternate	Locale
Corryn Brown	Erin Pincott	Dezaray Hawes	Samantha Fisher		Kamloops, British Columbia
Hollie Duncan	Megan Balsdon	Rachelle Strybosch	Tess Bobbie	Lori Olson-Johns (Note: Lori Olson-Johns replaced Megan Balsdon at third for Team Duncan's last two games.)	Woodstock, Ontario
Kerri Einarson	Val Sweeting	Shannon Birchard	Briane Meilleur		Gimli, Manitoba
Tracy Fleury	Selena Njegovan	Liz Fyfe	Kristin MacCuish		East St. Paul, Manitoba
Satsuki Fujisawa	Chinami Yoshida	Yumi Suzuki	Yurika Yoshida		Kitami, Japan
Gim Un-chi	Seol Ye-ji	Kim Su-ji	Seol Ye-eun	Park You-been	Uijeongbu, South Korea
Anna Hasselborg	Sara McManus	Agnes Knochenhauer	Sofia Mabergs		Sundbyberg, Sweden
Rachel Homan	Emma Miskew	Sarah Wilkes	Joanne Courtney		Ottawa, Ontario
Jennifer Jones	Kaitlyn Lawes	Jocelyn Peterman	Dawn McEwen	Lisa Weagle	Winnipeg, Manitoba
Kim Hye-rin (Note: As regular skip Kim Min-ji was in Europe competing on the mixed doubles tour, third Kim Hye-rin moved up to play skip and second Ha Seung-youn moved up to play third. Alternate Yang Tae-i moved into the second position.)	Ha Seung-youn	Yang Tae-i	Kim Su-jin		Chuncheon, South Korea
Alina Kovaleva	Yulia Portunova	Galina Arsenkina	Ekaterina Kuzmina		Saint Petersburg, Russia
Kelsey Rocque	Danielle Schmiemann	Dana Ferguson	Rachelle Brown		Edmonton, Alberta
Irene Schori	Carole Howald	Lara Stocker	Stefanie Berset		Limmattal, Switzerland
Alina Pätz (Fourth)	Silvana Tirinzoni (Skip)	Esther Neuenschwander	Melanie Barbezat		Aarau, Switzerland
Laura Walker	Kate Cameron	Taylor McDonald	Nadine Scotland		Edmonton, Alberta
Isabella Wranå	Almida de Val	Jennie Wåhlin	Maria Larsson		Sundbyberg, Sweden

=== Knockout brackets ===
==== A event ====
A Event	Qualifier 1
1	(Manitoba) Tracy Fleury	8
1	(British Columbia) Corryn Brown	5	9	(Manitoba) Tracy Fleury	8
2	(Russia) Alina Kovaleva	6	9	(Russia) Alina Kovaleva	1
2	(South Korea) Gim Un-chi	2	13	(Manitoba) Tracy Fleury	5
3	(Manitoba) Jennifer Jones	5	13	(Manitoba) Jennifer Jones	4
3	(South Korea) Team M. Kim	3	10	(Manitoba) Jennifer Jones	9
4	(Japan) Satsuki Fujisawa	5	10	(Alberta) Kelsey Rocque	3
4	(Alberta) Kelsey Rocque	7

A Event	Qualifier 2
5	(Sweden) Anna Hasselborg	6
5	(Switzerland) Irene Schori	4	11	(Sweden) Anna Hasselborg	7
6	(Ontario) Rachel Homan	6	11	(Ontario) Hollie Duncan	6
6	(Ontario) Hollie Duncan	8	14	(Sweden) Anna Hasselborg	4
7	(Manitoba) Kerri Einarson	6	14	(Switzerland) Silvana Tirinzoni	5
7	(Sweden) Isabella Wranå	5	12	(Manitoba) Kerri Einarson	5
8	(Switzerland) Silvana Tirinzoni	9	12	(Switzerland) Silvana Tirinzoni	8
8	(Alberta) Laura Walker	7

==== B event ====
B Event						Qualifier 3
15	(British Columbia) Corryn Brown	9
15	(South Korea) Gim Un-chi	5	19	(British Columbia) Corryn Brown	5
16	(South Korea) Team M. Kim	7	19	(South Korea) Team M. Kim	4
16	(Japan) Satsuki Fujisawa	3				23	(British Columbia) Corryn Brown	4
						23	(Sweden) Anna Hasselborg	8

B Event						Qualifier 4
17	(Switzerland) Irene Schori	4
17	(Ontario) Rachel Homan	5	20	(Ontario) Rachel Homan	6
18	(Sweden) Isabella Wranå	7	20	(Sweden) Isabella Wranå	8
18	(Alberta) Laura Walker	3				24	(Sweden) Isabella Wranå	6
						24	(Manitoba) Jennifer Jones	4

B Event			Qualifier 5
21	(Russia) Alina Kovaleva	1
21	(Alberta) Kelsey Rocque	9	25	(Alberta) Kelsey Rocque	9
22	(Ontario) Hollie Duncan	7	25	(Ontario) Hollie Duncan	1
22	(Manitoba) Kerri Einarson	5

==== C event ====
C Event						Qualifier 6
26	(South Korea) Gim Un-chi	4
26	(Japan) Satsuki Fujisawa	6	28	(Japan) Satsuki Fujisawa	3
			28	(Russia) Alina Kovaleva	6
						31	(Russia) Alina Kovaleva	8
						31	(Manitoba) Jennifer Jones	6

C Event						Qualifier 7
27	(Switzerland) Irene Schori	3
27	(Alberta) Laura Walker	9	29	(Alberta) Laura Walker	6
			29	(Manitoba) Kerri Einarson	5
						32	(Alberta) Laura Walker	6
						32	(British Columbia) Corryn Brown	1

C Event			Qualifier 8
30	(South Korea) Team M. Kim	3
30	(Ontario) Rachel Homan	4	33	(Ontario) Rachel Homan	7
			33	(Ontario) Hollie Duncan	5

=== Knockout results ===
All draw times are listed in Mountain Time (UTC−06:00).

==== Draw 2 ====
Tuesday, November 2, 11:30 am

Sheet C	1	2	3	4	5	6	7	8	9	Final
(Switzerland) Silvana Tirinzoni 🔨	2	0	0	1	0	2	0	2	2	9
(Alberta) Laura Walker	0	1	2	0	2	0	2	0	0	7

==== Draw 3 ====
Tuesday, November 2, 3:00 pm

Sheet A	1	2	3	4	5	6	7	8	Final
(Manitoba) Jennifer Jones	1	0	0	2	0	1	0	1	5
(South Korea) Team M. Kim 🔨	0	1	1	0	0	0	1	0	3

Sheet B	1	2	3	4	5	6	7	8	Final
(Japan) Satsuki Fujisawa 🔨	1	0	0	1	1	0	2	0	5
(Alberta) Kelsey Rocque	0	2	2	0	0	2	0	1	7

Sheet D	1	2	3	4	5	6	7	8	9	Final
(Manitoba) Kerri Einarson 🔨	2	0	0	1	0	0	2	0	1	6
(Sweden) Isabella Wranå	0	1	1	0	0	2	0	1	0	5

==== Draw 4 ====
Tuesday, November 2, 6:30 pm

Sheet A	1	2	3	4	5	6	7	8	Final
(Manitoba) Tracy Fleury 🔨	2	0	3	1	0	2	0	X	8
(British Columbia) Corryn Brown	0	1	0	0	3	0	1	X	5

Sheet B	1	2	3	4	5	6	7	8	Final
(Russia) Alina Kovaleva	0	0	0	3	0	2	1	X	6
(South Korea) Gim Un-chi 🔨	0	1	1	0	0	0	0	X	2

Sheet C	1	2	3	4	5	6	7	8	Final
(Ontario) Rachel Homan	0	3	0	2	0	0	1	X	6
(Ontario) Hollie Duncan 🔨	1	0	1	0	3	3	0	X	8

Sheet D	1	2	3	4	5	6	7	8	Final
(Sweden) Anna Hasselborg	3	0	1	0	0	1	1	X	6
(Switzerland) Irene Schori 🔨	0	1	0	1	2	0	0	X	4

==== Draw 5 ====
Wednesday, November 3, 8:00 am

Sheet B	1	2	3	4	5	6	7	8	Final
(Sweden) Isabella Wranå	0	2	0	2	2	0	1	X	7
(Alberta) Laura Walker 🔨	1	0	1	0	0	1	0	X	3

==== Draw 7 ====
Wednesday, November 3, 4:00 pm

Sheet B	1	2	3	4	5	6	7	8	Final
(Manitoba) Kerri Einarson 🔨	1	0	1	0	2	0	1	0	5
(Switzerland) Silvana Tirinzoni	0	2	0	2	0	2	0	2	8

Sheet C	1	2	3	4	5	6	7	8	Final
(British Columbia) Corryn Brown	0	1	0	2	0	2	4	X	9
(South Korea) Gim Un-chi 🔨	2	0	1	0	2	0	0	X	5

Sheet D	1	2	3	4	5	6	7	8	Final
(Manitoba) Tracy Fleury 🔨	1	0	1	3	0	1	2	X	8
(Russia) Alina Kovaleva	0	1	0	0	0	0	0	X	1

==== Draw 8 ====
Wednesday, November 3, 8:00 pm

Sheet A	1	2	3	4	5	6	7	8	Final
(Switzerland) Irene Schori 🔨	0	1	0	0	2	0	1	0	4
(Ontario) Rachel Homan	0	0	1	0	0	3	0	1	5

Sheet B	1	2	3	4	5	6	7	8	Final
(Sweden) Anna Hasselborg 🔨	0	1	0	1	0	2	0	3	7
(Ontario) Hollie Duncan	0	0	2	0	2	0	2	0	6

Sheet C	1	2	3	4	5	6	7	8	Final
(South Korea) Team M. Kim 🔨	0	0	1	1	0	2	2	1	7
(Japan) Satsuki Fujisawa	0	1	0	0	2	0	0	0	3

Sheet D	1	2	3	4	5	6	7	8	Final
(Manitoba) Jennifer Jones 🔨	2	4	2	0	0	1	X	X	9
(Alberta) Kelsey Rocque	0	0	0	2	1	0	X	X	3

==== Draw 10 ====
Thursday, November 4, 12:00 pm

Sheet A	1	2	3	4	5	6	7	8	Final
(Ontario) Hollie Duncan 🔨	2	1	0	2	0	0	1	1	7
(Manitoba) Kerri Einarson	0	0	1	0	2	2	0	0	5

Sheet B	1	2	3	4	5	6	7	8	Final
(Russia) Alina Kovaleva	0	0	0	1	0	X	X	X	1
(Alberta) Kelsey Rocque 🔨	4	1	2	0	2	X	X	X	9

Sheet C	1	2	3	4	5	6	7	8	9	Final
(Ontario) Rachel Homan	0	0	2	0	3	0	1	0	0	6
(Sweden) Isabella Wranå 🔨	0	1	0	0	0	2	0	3	2	8

Sheet D	1	2	3	4	5	6	7	8	9	Final
(British Columbia) Corryn Brown 🔨	0	1	0	0	0	2	0	1	1	5
(South Korea) Team M. Kim	1	0	0	1	1	0	1	0	0	4

==== Draw 12 ====
Thursday, November 4, 8:00 pm

Sheet A	1	2	3	4	5	6	7	8	Final
(Sweden) Anna Hasselborg 🔨	0	1	0	1	0	0	2	0	4
(Switzerland) Silvana Tirinzoni	0	0	3	0	1	0	0	1	5

Sheet B	1	2	3	4	5	6	7	8	Final
(South Korea) Gim Un-chi 🔨	1	0	0	0	3	0	0	0	4
(Japan) Satsuki Fujisawa	0	1	1	0	0	0	3	1	6

Sheet C	1	2	3	4	5	6	7	8	Final
(Manitoba) Tracy Fleury 🔨	2	0	0	1	0	1	0	1	5
(Manitoba) Jennifer Jones	0	2	0	0	1	0	1	0	4

Sheet D	1	2	3	4	5	6	7	8	Final
(Switzerland) Irene Schori 🔨	2	1	0	0	0	0	0	X	3
(Alberta) Laura Walker	0	0	4	1	1	2	1	X	9

==== Draw 13 ====
Friday, November 5, 8:00 am

Sheet A	1	2	3	4	5	6	7	8	Final
(Alberta) Laura Walker 🔨	0	3	0	1	0	1	0	1	6
(Manitoba) Kerri Einarson	0	0	2	0	1	0	2	0	5

Sheet D	1	2	3	4	5	6	7	8	Final
(Japan) Satsuki Fujisawa	0	0	1	0	1	0	1	0	3
(Russia) Alina Kovaleva 🔨	1	2	0	1	0	1	0	1	6

==== Draw 14 ====
Friday, November 5, 12:00 pm

Sheet A	1	2	3	4	5	6	7	8	Final
(South Korea) Team M. Kim	0	0	0	1	0	2	0	0	3
(Ontario) Rachel Homan 🔨	0	1	1	0	1	0	0	1	4

Sheet B	1	2	3	4	5	6	7	8	Final
(Sweden) Isabella Wranå 🔨	0	3	0	1	1	0	0	1	6
(Manitoba) Jennifer Jones	1	0	1	0	0	0	2	0	4

Sheet C	1	2	3	4	5	6	7	8	Final
(British Columbia) Corryn Brown	0	0	2	0	0	2	0	X	4
(Sweden) Anna Hasselborg 🔨	0	2	0	1	4	0	1	X	8

Sheet D	1	2	3	4	5	6	7	8	Final
(Alberta) Kelsey Rocque 🔨	2	1	2	0	4	X	X	X	9
(Ontario) Hollie Duncan	0	0	0	1	0	X	X	X	1

==== Draw 16 ====
Friday, November 5, 8:00 pm

Sheet B	1	2	3	4	5	6	7	8	9	Final
(Ontario) Rachel Homan	0	1	0	1	0	2	1	0	2	7
(Ontario) Hollie Duncan 🔨	1	0	1	0	2	0	0	1	0	5

Sheet C	1	2	3	4	5	6	7	8	Final
(Russia) Alina Kovaleva 🔨	2	0	3	1	0	2	0	X	8
(Manitoba) Jennifer Jones	0	1	0	0	4	0	1	X	6

Sheet D	1	2	3	4	5	6	7	8	Final
(Alberta) Laura Walker 🔨	2	1	1	0	2	0	0	X	6
(British Columbia) Corryn Brown	0	0	0	1	0	0	0	X	1

=== Playoffs ===
Quarterfinals
A1	(Manitoba) Tracy Fleury	7
C2	(Alberta) Laura Walker	5
B3	(Alberta) Kelsey Rocque	7
B2	(Sweden) Isabella Wranå	5
A2	(Switzerland) Silvana Tirinzoni	5
C1	(Russia) Alina Kovaleva	3
B1	(Sweden) Anna Hasselborg	8
C3	(Ontario) Rachel Homan	7

Semifinals
A1	(Manitoba) Tracy Fleury	6
B3	(Alberta) Kelsey Rocque	3
A2	(Switzerland) Silvana Tirinzoni	4
B1	(Sweden) Anna Hasselborg	5

Final
A1	(Manitoba) Tracy Fleury	6
B1	(Sweden) Anna Hasselborg	9

==== Quarterfinals ====
Saturday, November 6, 12:00 pm

Sheet A	1	2	3	4	5	6	7	8	Final
(Sweden) Anna Hasselborg 🔨	2	0	0	1	0	3	0	2	8
(Ontario) Rachel Homan	0	2	1	0	2	0	2	0	7

Player percentages
(Sweden) Team Hasselborg		(Ontario) Team Homan	
Sofia Mabergs	77%	Joanne Courtney	94%
Agnes Knochenhauer	81%	Sarah Wilkes	75%
Sara McManus	55%	Emma Miskew	73%
Anna Hasselborg	78%	Rachel Homan	83%
Total	73%	Total	81%

Sheet B	1	2	3	4	5	6	7	8	Final
(Switzerland) Silvana Tirinzoni 🔨	1	0	1	1	0	2	0	X	5
(Russia) Alina Kovaleva	0	1	0	0	2	0	0	X	3

Player percentages
(Switzerland) Team Tirinzoni		(Russia) Team Kovaleva	
Melanie Barbezat	94%	Ekaterina Kuzmina	86%
Esther Neuenschwander	83%	Galina Arsenkina	92%
Silvana Tirinzoni	78%	Yulia Portunova	73%
Alina Pätz	91%	Alina Kovaleva	63%
Total	86%	Total	79%

Sheet C	1	2	3	4	5	6	7	8	Final
(Manitoba) Tracy Fleury 🔨	1	0	0	2	1	0	2	1	7
(Alberta) Laura Walker	0	2	2	0	0	1	0	0	5

Player percentages
(Manitoba) Team Fleury		(Alberta) Team Walker	
Kristin MacCuish	88%	Nadine Scotland	73%
Liz Fyfe	83%	Taylor McDonald	78%
Selena Njegovan	58%	Kate Cameron	84%
Tracy Fleury	68%	Laura Walker	64%
Total	74%	Total	75%

Sheet D	1	2	3	4	5	6	7	8	Final
(Alberta) Kelsey Rocque 🔨	0	0	2	0	3	0	1	1	7
(Sweden) Isabella Wranå	0	1	0	2	0	2	0	0	5

Player percentages
(Alberta) Team Rocque		(Sweden) Team Wranå	
Rachelle Brown	77%	Maria Larsson	66%
Dana Ferguson	59%	Jennie Wåhlin	86%
Danielle Schmiemann	64%	Almida de Val	77%
Kelsey Rocque	77%	Isabella Wranå	63%
Total	69%	Total	73%

==== Semifinals ====
Saturday, November 6, 8:00 pm

Sheet A	1	2	3	4	5	6	7	8	Final
(Manitoba) Tracy Fleury 🔨	2	0	1	0	2	0	1	X	6
(Alberta) Kelsey Rocque	0	1	0	1	0	1	0	X	3

Player percentages
(Manitoba) Team Fleury		(Alberta) Team Rocque	
Kristin MacCuish	94%	Rachelle Brown	97%
Liz Fyfe	98%	Dana Ferguson	91%
Selena Njegovan	94%	Danielle Schmiemann	78%
Tracy Fleury	97%	Kelsey Rocque	93%
Total	96%	Total	90%

Sheet C	1	2	3	4	5	6	7	8	Final
(Switzerland) Silvana Tirinzoni 🔨	0	0	2	0	0	2	0	0	4
(Sweden) Anna Hasselborg	3	0	0	1	0	0	0	1	5

Player percentages
(Switzerland) Team Tirinzoni		(Sweden) Team Hasselborg	
Melanie Barbezat	95%	Sofia Mabergs	100%
Esther Neuenschwander	67%	Agnes Knochenhauer	83%
Silvana Tirinzoni	84%	Sara McManus	89%
Alina Pätz	84%	Anna Hasselborg	89%
Total	83%	Total	90%

==== Final ====
Sunday, November 7, 2:00 pm

Sheet B	1	2	3	4	5	6	7	8	9	Final
(Manitoba) Tracy Fleury 🔨	0	1	0	2	0	2	0	1	0	6
(Sweden) Anna Hasselborg	0	0	4	0	1	0	1	0	3	9

Player percentages
(Manitoba) Team Fleury		(Sweden) Team Hasselborg	
Kristin MacCuish	93%	Sofia Mabergs	93%
Liz Fyfe	86%	Agnes Knochenhauer	89%
Selena Njegovan	86%	Sara McManus	86%
Tracy Fleury	79%	Anna Hasselborg	92%
Total	86%	Total	90%
