= Oakville Fall Classic =

Annual curling competition in Canada

Location in Canada

The Oakville Fall Classic (formerly the Cameron's Brewing Oakville Fall Classic and the Biosteel Oakville Fall Classic) is an annual bonspiel on the men's and women's World Curling Tour and Ontario Curling Tour. It is held annually in September at the Oakville Curling Club in Oakville, Ontario.

== Past champions ==
=== Men ===
| Year | Winning team | Runner up team | Purse (CAD) | Winner's share |
|---|---|---|---|---|
| 2015 | (Ontario) Codey Maus, Scott McDonald, Wesley Forget, Jeff Grant | (Ontario) Pat Ferris, Andrew Fairfull, Craig Fairfull, Nathan Small | $12,600 | $3,200 |
| 2016 | (Scotland) Kyle Smith, Thomas Muirhead, Kyle Waddell, Cammy Smith | (United States) Heath McCormick, Chris Plys, Korey Dropkin, Thomas Howell | $13,000 | $3,000 |
| 2017 | (Scotland) Bruce Mouat, Grant Hardie, Bobby Lammie, Hammy McMillan Jr. | (South Korea) Kim Chang-min, Seong Se-hyeon, Oh Eun-soo, Lee Ki-bok | $15,000 | $3,400 |
| 2018 | (Japan) Yuta Matsumura, Tetsuro Shimizu, Yasumasa Tanida, Shinya Abe | (Saskatchewan) Matt Dunstone, Braeden Moskowy, Catlin Schneider, Dustin Kidby | $12,000 | $3,000 |
| 2019 | (Switzerland) Yannick Schwaller, Michael Brunner, Romano Meier, Marcel Käufeler | (South Korea) Kim Chang-min, Lee Ki-jeong, Kim Hak-kyun, Lee Ki-bok | $16,000 | $3,500 |
| 2020 | Cancelled | | | |
| 2021 | (Ontario) Glenn Howard, Scott Howard, David Mathers, Tim March | (Ontario) Tanner Horgan, Jacob Horgan, Wesley Forget, Scott Chadwick | $6,000 | $2,000 |

=== Women ===
| Year | Winning team | Runner up team | Purse (CAD) | Winner's share |
|---|---|---|---|---|
| 2015 | (Ontario) Jacqueline Harrison, Janet Murphy, Stephanie Matheson, Melissa Foster | (Ontario) Mallory Kean, Carly Howard, Kerilynn Mathers, Cheryl Kreviazuk | $12,600 | $3,200 |
| 2016 | (Sweden) Anna Hasselborg, Sara McManus, Agnes Knochenhauer, Sofia Mabergs | (Sweden) Isabella Wranå, Jennie Wåhlin, Almida de Val, Fanny Sjöberg | $10,000 | $2,200 |
| 2017 | (Russia) Yulia Portunova (Fourth), Uliana Vasilyeva (Skip), Galina Arsenkina, Julia Guzieva | (Ontario) Susan Froud, Lauren Horton, Margot Flemming, Megan Arnold | $9,000 | $2,250 |
| 2018 | (Japan) Sayaka Yoshimura, Kaho Onodera, Anna Ohmiya, Yumie Funayama | (Ontario) Erica Hopson, Breanna Rozon, Erin Butler, Emma Malfara | $7,200 | $2,000 |
| 2019 | (Scotland) Eve Muirhead, Lauren Gray, Jennifer Dodds, Vicky Wright | (Switzerland) Alina Pätz (Fourth), Silvana Tirinzoni (Skip), Esther Neuenschwander, Melanie Barbezat | $16,000 | $3,500 |
| 2020 | Cancelled | | | |
| 2021 | (United States) Jamie Sinclair, Monica Walker, Cora Farrell, Elizabeth Cousins | (Prince Edward Island) Suzanne Birt, Marie Christianson, Meaghan Hughes, Michelle McQuaid | $3,800 | $1,500 |
