= Kyle Waddell =

Scottish curler (born 1993)

- Curler
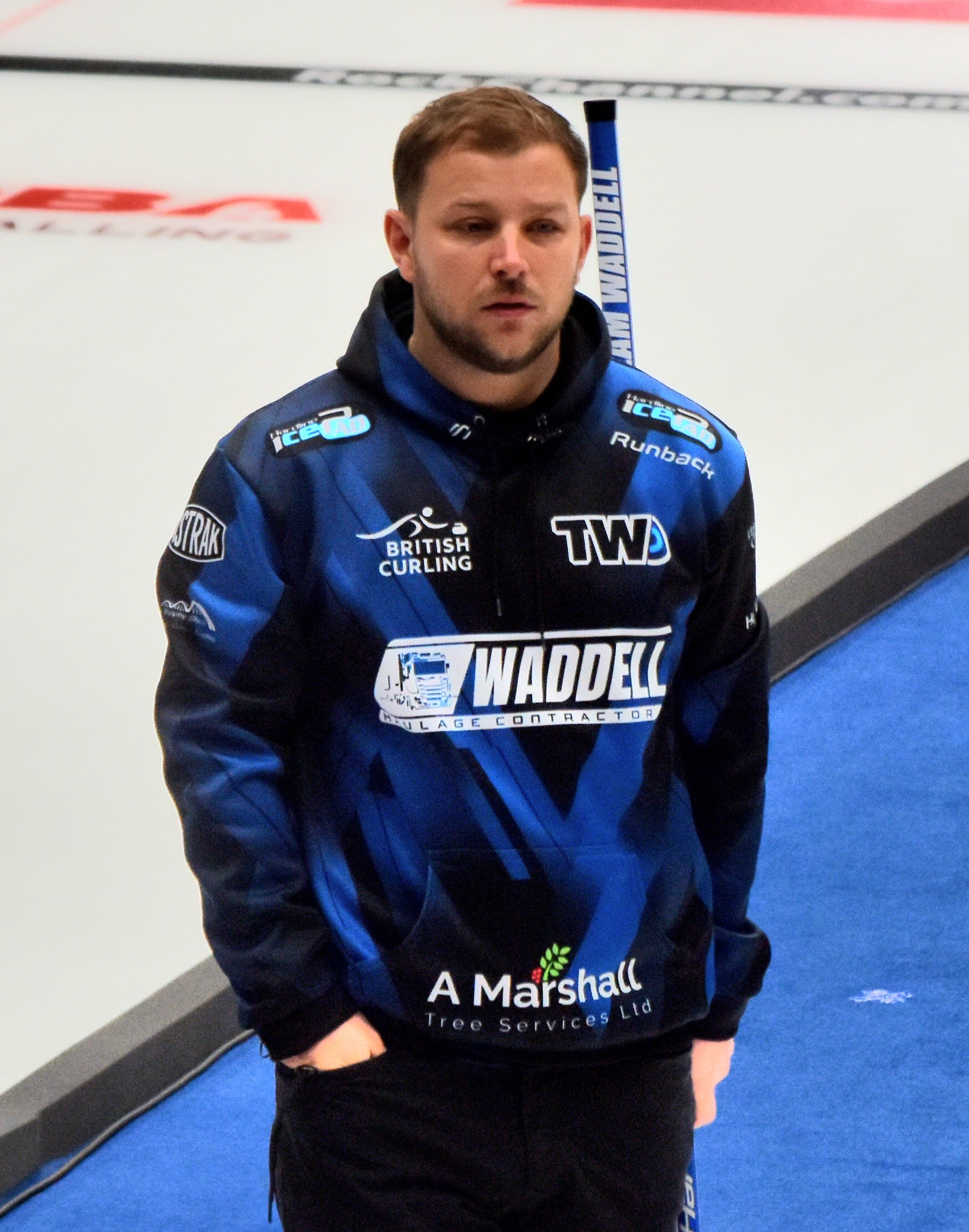
- Waddell at the 2026 Players' Championship
- Born: 15 December 1993 (age 32); Bellshill, Scotland

Team
- Curling club: Hamilton & Thornyhill CC, Hamilton, SCO
- Skip: Kyle Waddell
- Third: Mark Watt
- Second: Angus Bryce
- Lead: Blair Haswell

Curling career
- Member Association: Scotland; Great Britain
- World Championship: 4 (2022, 2023, 2024, 2025)
- European Championship: 7 (2015, 2017, 2019, 2022, 2023, 2024, 2025)
- Olympic: 2 (2018, 2026)
- Grand Slam victories: 1 (2018 National)
Medal record
Men's curling
Representing Great Britain
Olympic Games
| Silver medal – second place | 2026 Milano Cortina | Team |
Representing Scotland
World Championships
| Gold medal – first place | 2023 Ottawa |
| Gold medal – first place | 2025 Moose Jaw |
European Championships
| Gold medal – first place | 2022 Östersund |
| Gold medal – first place | 2023 Aberdeen |
| Silver medal – second place | 2017 St Gallen |
| Silver medal – second place | 2024 Lohja |
| Bronze medal – third place | 2019 Helsingborg |
| Bronze medal – third place | 2025 Lohja |
World Junior Championships
| Gold medal – first place | 2013 Sochi |
| Silver medal – second place | 2014 Flims |
| Bronze medal – third place | 2012 Östersund |
Representing Great Britain
Winter Universiade
| Silver medal – second place | 2013 Trentino |
Scottish Mixed Doubles Championship
| Bronze medal – third place | 2024 Perth |
| Bronze medal – third place | 2026 Aberdeen |

Kyle Waddell (born 15 December 1993 in Bellshill) is a Scottish curler from Hamilton, Scotland. He currently skips his own team. He competed for Great Britain at the 2018 Winter Olympics in PyeongChang, South Korea, placing fifth. He is also the alternate for the Great Britain team at the 2026 Winter Olympics, winning a silver medal in the event. He has represented Scotland at seven European Curling Championships and three World Junior Curling Championships, winning gold at the 2013 World Junior Curling Championships as a member of the Kyle Smith rink.

== Career ==
=== Juniors ===
During his junior career, Waddell played second for the Kyle Smith rink. The team represented Scotland at three World Junior Curling Championships from 2012 to 2014. In 2012, the team, consisting of Thomas Muirhead, Kerr Drummond and Hammy McMillan Jr. went 7–2 through the round robin before losing the 3 vs. 4 page playoff game to Norway's Markus Høiberg. However, they avenged this loss in the bronze medal game when they defeated the same Norwegian team to finish third. In 2013, the team, now with Cammy Smith playing lead instead of Drummond, topped the round robin with an 8–1 record. They then beat Canada's Matt Dunstone in the 1 vs. 2 page playoff game and then defeated Russia's Evgeny Arkhipov to secure the gold medal. It was Scotland's first time winning the event since 1996. At the 2014 World Junior Curling Championships, the team, now with Duncan Menzies at alternate instead of McMillan went 6–3 in the round robin, but were able to defeat Norway in the 1 vs. 2 game to once again qualify for the final. There, they were bested by Switzerland's Yannick Schwaller, settling for silver. Waddell was also part of the Smith rink that earned a silver medal for Great Britain at the 2013 Winter Universiade. After a 6–3 record in the round robin, they lost to Sweden's Oskar Eriksson in the final.

=== Men's ===
Following juniors, Waddell continued to curl with the Smith rink. The team immediately found success on the World Curling Tour, reaching the finals of the Dumfries Curling Challenge, the Mercure Perth Masters and the European Masters during the 2014–15 season. Team Smith competed in their first Grand Slam of Curling event at the 2015 GSOC Tour Challenge Tier 2 where they reached the semifinals. They also made the semifinals of the Swiss Cup Basel before being eliminated by the Brad Gushue rink. In October, the team won the qualifier for the 2015 European Curling Championships, defeating the Tom Brewster rink in the best-of-three final. They would go on to miss the playoffs at the Europeans after losing in a tiebreaker to Sweden's Niklas Edin. The 2015–16 season also marked Team Smith's first tour win together at the Edinburgh International where they defeated Jaap van Dorp to claim the title.

The 2016–17 season was a breakthrough season for the Smith rink, beginning at the Oakville Fall Classic where they captured the event title. They also reached the semifinals at the Stu Sells Oakville Tankard, the Swiss Cup Basel and the Red Deer Curling Classic. In Grand Slam play, the team in four events. The team's best finish came at the 2016 GSOC Tour Challenge where they made it all the way to the final before being defeated by the Edin rink. They also made the semifinals at the 2017 Players' Championship but were again eliminated by Team Edin. At the Scottish Men's Curling Championship, they finished third after losing both the 1 vs. 2 page playoff game and semifinal to the David Murdoch and Bruce Mouat rinks respectively. They ended their season at the 2017 Euronics European Masters where they beat the Edin rink in the final.

In June 2017, it was announced that British Curling had selected the Smith rink to represent Great Britain at the 2018 Winter Olympics in PyeongChang, South Korea. The team were chosen as they were the top ranked British team on the 2016–17 World Curling Tour rankings, despite having never won the Scottish Men's Championship. They were also chosen over the Murdoch, Mouat and Tom Brewster rinks, which caused controversy due to the Murdoch rink winning the 2017 Scottish Championship. However, because they missed out on the playoffs at the 2017 World Men's Curling Championship, the advantage was ultimately handed to the Smith rink.

Leading up to the 2018 Winter Olympics, the Smith rink did not have the best season on tour. They failed to make it past the quarterfinals in any of their fall events and missed the playoffs at both the 2017 GSOC Tour Challenge and the 2017 Masters. Due to their selection as the British Olympic team, they already qualified to represent Scotland at the 2017 European Curling Championships. There, the team went 6–3 through the round robin, qualifying for the playoffs. They then defeated the higher seeded Switzerland's Peter de Cruz rink before losing in the final to the Edin rink, earning the silver medal. Before the Games, they played in three more tour events, with their best finish coming at the German Masters where they lost in the final to Marc Pfister. At the Olympics, the team had mixed results throughout the round robin, ultimately finishing tied for third with a 5–4 record. This put them into a tiebreaker against the Swiss de Cruz rink, which they lost 9–5, eliminating them from contention. Immediately following the Games, the team played in a best-of-three playoff against the Mouat rink to determine who would represent Scotland at the 2018 World Men's Curling Championship, which the Mouat rink won two games to one. In their final event of the season, Team Smith reached the quarterfinals of the 2018 Players' Championship, where they once again were defeated by the Edin rink. Following the season, Waddell left the Smith rink and joined the newly formed Ross Paterson rink at third for the 2018–19 season. The team also included second Duncan Menzies and lead Michael Goodfellow.

The Paterson rink had a successful first season on tour. In their first few events together, they reached the semifinals of the AMJ Campbell Shorty Jenkins Classic and the Red Deer Curling Classic as well as the final of the Ashley HomeStore Curling Classic where they were defeated by the Glen Muirhead rink in an all-Scottish final. Team Paterson played in six of the seven Grand Slam events during the season, finding the most success at the 2018 National where they defeated Team Bruce Mouat in the final, in the first all-Scotland Grand Slam final. They also made the playoffs at two other Slams, reaching the semifinals of the 2019 Players' Championship and the quarterfinals of the 2018 Masters. At the Scottish Championship, the team finished in third place after losing in the semifinal to the Muirhead rink. Team Paterson were selected to represented Scotland at the third leg of the 2018–19 Curling World Cup. There, they finished in third place after finishing the round robin with a 5–1 record. They also qualified for the grand final of the Curling World Cup, where they again finished in third.

In their second season together, the Paterson rink found more success on tour, making the finals of both the Swiss Cup Basel and the Aberdeen International Curling Championship. In October, they defeated both the Mouat and Muirhead rinks to earn the right to represent Scotland at the 2019 European Curling Championships. There, the team finished with a 5–4 round robin record, enough to qualify for the playoffs. They then lost to Sweden in the semifinal before defeating Denmark to claim the bronze medal. In Grand Slam play, the team played in three events, only making the playoffs at the 2019 Masters. They finished third at the Scottish championship.

Due to the COVID-19 pandemic, there were a limited number of tour events held during the 2020–21 season. Team Paterson did play in a series of domestic events put on by the British Curling Association, finishing third at all three events hosted. After the season, Michael Goodfellow retired from competitive curling and Waddell's brother, Craig Waddell, joined the team as their new lead.

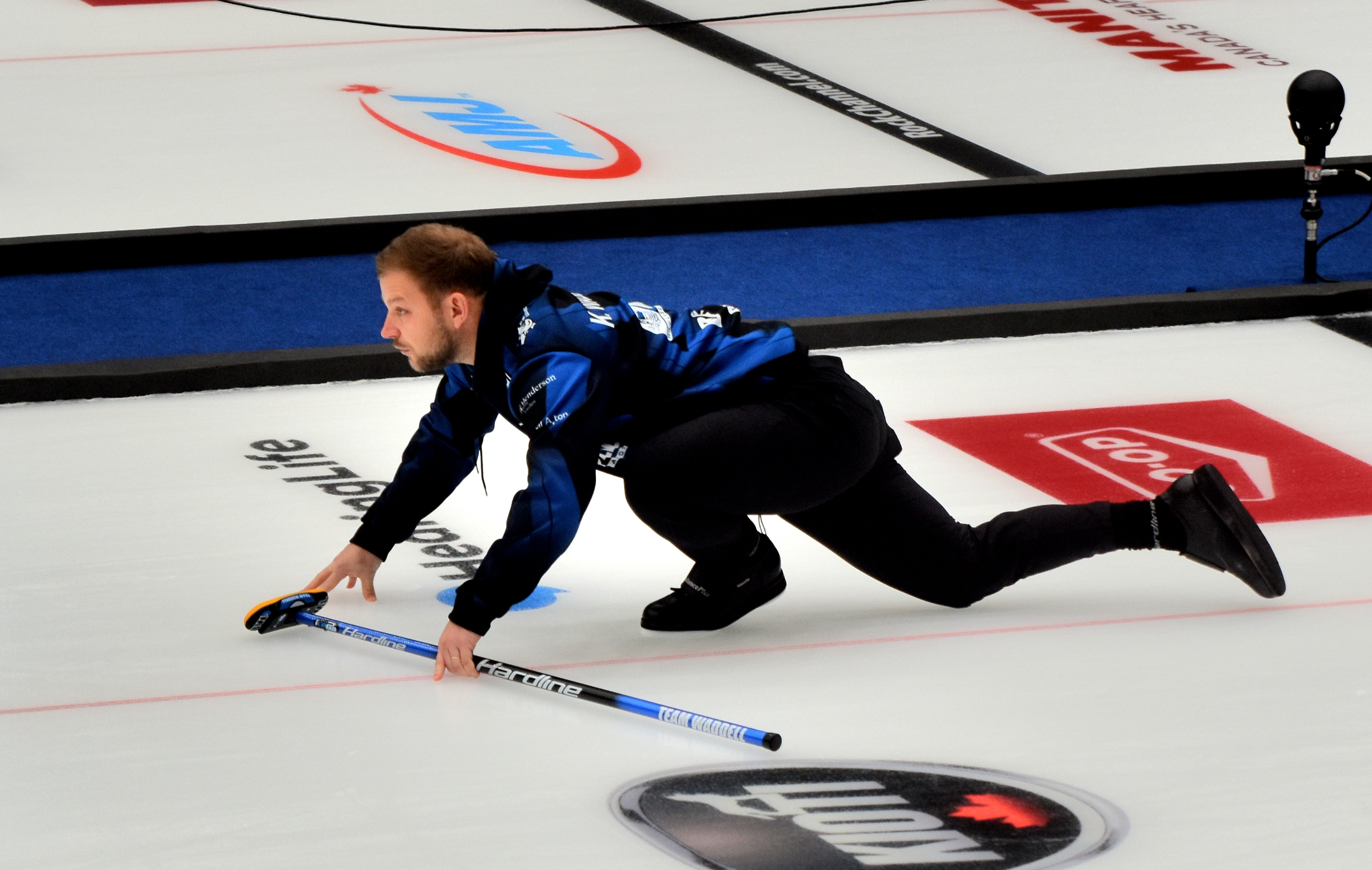
Waddell watches his shot at the 2026 Players' Championship in Steinbach, Manitoba.

During the 2021–22 season, Team Paterson reached the finals of the KW Fall Classic where they were beaten by the Ross Whyte rink. They played in two Grand Slams, finishing winless at both the 2021 Masters and the 2021 National. In February, the team went 8–2 during the round robin at the 2022 Scottish Curling Championships and later defeated the Whyte rink in the championship final. They were also picked to represent Scotland at the 2022 World Men's Curling Championship after being selected over the Bruce Mouat rink that won silver at the 2022 Winter Olympics, a decision that caused controversy due to how it was handled. For the championship, the team altered their lineup, with Waddell being named as the team's skip while Paterson continued to throw fourth stones. At the Worlds, the team qualified for the playoffs with a 7–5 record. They then lost in the qualification game to the United States' Korey Dropkin, settling for fifth place.

In June 2022, both Paterson and Menzies announced their retirement from elite level curling. Waddell then formed his own team with third Craig Waddell, second Mark Taylor and lead Gavin Barr for the 2022–23 season. As an alternate for Bruce Mouat's team, Waddell won the 2025 World Curling Championship.

In the off season, British Curling shuffled around their men's lineups, announcing that Waddell would now be skipping a new team with Mark Watt, Angus Bryce, and Blair Haswell for the 2025–26 season. The team had a strong start together, qualifying for the Grand Slam of Curling's 2025 Tour Challenge, where they would lose in the quarterfinals 6–5 to John Epping.

== Personal life ==
Waddell is the grandson of 1979 European champion Jimmy Waddell. His younger brother Craig is also a curler who currently plays third on his team. They also played together in the 2019 European Championships. Waddell studied at University of the West of Scotland's Hamilton Campus graduating with a BSc (Hons) Sport Development in 2016. Waddell is employed as a Financial advisor.

== Grand Slam record ==
Key
| C | Champion |
| F | Lost in Final |
| SF | Lost in Semifinal |
| QF | Lost in Quarterfinals |
| R16 | Lost in the round of 16 |
| Q | Did not advance to playoffs |
| T2 | Played in Tier 2 event |
| DNP | Did not participate in event |
| N/A | Not a Grand Slam event that season |

| Event | 2015–16 | 2016–17 | 2017–18 | 2018–19 | 2019–20 | 2020–21 | 2021–22 | 2022–23 | 2023–24 | 2024–25 | 2025–26 | 2026–27 |
|---|---|---|---|---|---|---|---|---|---|---|---|---|
| Invitational | T2 | F | Q | Q | DNP | N/A | N/A | DNP | DNP | T2 | QF | Q |
| Masters | DNP | Q | Q | QF | QF | N/A | Q | DNP | DNP | DNP | T2 | Q |
| National | DNP | DNP | DNP | C | Q | N/A | Q | DNP | DNP | DNP | QF | Q |
| Open | DNP | Q | DNP | DNP | Q | N/A | N/A | DNP | DNP | DNP | Q | DNP |
| Players' | DNP | SF | QF | SF | N/A | DNP | DNP | DNP | DNP | DNP | F | |
| Champions Cup | DNP | DNP | DNP | Q | N/A | DNP | DNP | DNP | N/A | N/A | N/A | N/A |
| Elite 10 | DNP | DNP | DNP | Q | N/A | N/A | N/A | N/A | N/A | N/A | N/A | N/A |

== Teams ==
| Season | Skip | Third | Second | Lead | Alternate |
|---|---|---|---|---|---|
| 2010–11 | Graeme Black | Kyle Waddell | Peter MacIntyre | Craig Waddell | |
| 2011–12 | Kyle Smith | Thomas Muirhead | Kyle Waddell | Kerr Drummond | Hammy McMillan Jr. |
| 2012–13 | Kyle Smith | Thomas Muirhead | Kyle Waddell | Cammy Smith | Hammy McMillan Jr. |
| 2013–14 | Kyle Smith | Thomas Muirhead | Kyle Waddell | Cammy Smith | Duncan Menzies |
| 2014–15 | Kyle Smith | Grant Hardie | Kyle Waddell | Cammy Smith | Duncan Menzies |
| 2015–16 | Kyle Smith | Thomas Muirhead | Kyle Waddell | Cammy Smith | Glen Muirhead |
| 2016–17 | Kyle Smith | Thomas Muirhead | Kyle Waddell | Cammy Smith | |
| 2017–18 | Kyle Smith | Thomas Muirhead | Kyle Waddell | Cammy Smith | Glen Muirhead |
| 2018–19 | Ross Paterson | Kyle Waddell | Duncan Menzies | Michael Goodfellow | |
| 2019–20 | Ross Paterson | Kyle Waddell | Duncan Menzies | Michael Goodfellow | Craig Waddell |
| 2020–21 | Ross Paterson | Kyle Waddell | Duncan Menzies | Michael Goodfellow | |
| 2021–22 | Ross Paterson | Kyle Waddell | Duncan Menzies | Craig Waddell | Euan Kyle (WMCC) |
| 2022–23 | Kyle Waddell | Craig Waddell | Mark Taylor | Gavin Barr | |
| 2023–24 | Kyle Waddell | Craig Waddell | Mark Taylor | Gavin Barr | |
| 2024–25 | Kyle Waddell | Craig Waddell | Mark Taylor | Gavin Barr | |
| 2025–26 | Kyle Waddell | Mark Watt | Angus Bryce | Blair Haswell | |
| 2026–27 | Kyle Waddell | Mark Watt | Angus Bryce | Blair Haswell | |
