= Logan Gray =

Scottish curler

- Curler
- Born: 23 June 1986 (age 40)

Team
- Curling club: Active Stirling, Stirling

Curling career
- Member Association: Scotland
Medal record
Curling
Representing Scotland
World Junior Championships
Bronze medal – third place	2005 Pinerolo
Bronze medal – third place	2006 Jeonju
Scottish Mixed Doubles Championship
Gold medal – first place	2007 Edinburgh
Gold medal – first place	2009 Edinburgh
Silver medal – second place	2014 Glasgow

Logan Gray (born 23 June 1986) is a Scottish former curler. He is a two-time World Junior curling bronze medallist. He is the brother of curler Lauren Gray.

Gray was educated at Balfron High School, where he became Scottish Schools Curling Champion in 2001, and the University of Stirling, where he graduated with a BA in Accounting and Finance in 2006.

Gray has participated at numerous Scottish national championships. He has one World Curling Tour title from the Mercure Perth Masters in 2014. He retired from international competition in June 2014.

Gray was ice development officer at Active Stirling from June 2006 to May 2015. He was appointed as strategic relationship manager at British Blind Sport in September 2016. He also works as a commentator for the World Curling Federation's television arm and commentates on broadcasts of international tournaments. He was involved in commentating for the BBC television coverage of the curling within the 2018 Winter Olympics, the 2022 Winter Olympics and the 2026 Winter Olympics.
