= Mercure Perth Masters =

Annual curling competition in Scotland

- Established: 1971
- Host city: Perth, Scotland
- Arena: Dewars Centre
- Men's purse: GBP 38,250
- Women's purse: GBP 15,900

Current champions (2026)
- Men: (Scotland) Ross Whyte
- Women: (Denmark) Madeleine Dupont

The Mercure Perth Masters is an annual bonspiel, or curling tournament, that takes place at the Dewars Centre in Perth, Scotland. The tournament has been held in both a triple-knockout format and a round robin format. The tournament, started in 1971, and later became a part of the World Curling Tour (and has been since at least 2002). Curlers from outside Scotland have been dominant in this bonspiel.

The event has also been known as the Cream of the Barley Perth Masters (1986) Stakis Masters at Perth (1994 & 1995), the Jarvis Masters @ Perth (2001), the Ramada Jarvis Masters @ Perth (2002) Ramada Jarvis Masters (2003) and the Ramada Perth Masters (2004-2011)

In 2020, the Women's World Curling Tour event, the City of Perth Ladies International, was renamed as the Mercure Perth Masters and will know be known under the new name.

== Past champions ==
=== Men ===
Only skip's name is displayed.

Year	Winning skip	Runner up skip	Purse (GBP)
1971	(Scotland) Bill Muirhead		
1972	(Scotland) Alex F. Torrance		
1973	(Scotland) Alex F. Torrance		
1974	(Scotland) David Horton		
1975	(Scotland) Dave Porteous		
1976	(Scotland) Chuck Hay		
1977	(Scotland) Bob Martin		
1978	(Scotland) Gordon Muirhead		
1979	(Scotland) Jimmy Waddell		
1980	(Scotland) Willie Jamieson		
1981	(Scotland) Colin Hamilton		
1982	(Switzerland) Markus Känzig		
1983	(Scotland) Alan Glen		
1984	(Canada) Scott Henderson		
1985	(Scotland) Willie Young		
1986	(Scotland) Robert Gray		
1987	(Scotland) Willie Young		
1988–1993	Not held		
1994	(Scotland) David Smith		
1995	(Scotland) Hammy McMillan	(Switzerland) Markus Eggler	16,000
1996	(Scotland) Gordon Muirhead		
1997	(Switzerland) Markus Eggler		
1998	(Scotland) Hammy McMillan		
1999	(Canada) Guy Hemmings		
2000	(Norway) Pål Trulsen		
2001	(Scotland) Tom Brewster	(Switzerland) Ralph Stöckli	11,100
2002	(Scotland) Bob Kelly	(Scotland) Peter de Boer	$24,160 (CDN)
2003	(Norway) Pål Trulsen	(Scotland) Warwick Smith	
2004	(Scotland) Tom Brewster	(Scotland) Robert Kelly	26,800
2005	(Canada) Randy Ferbey	(Scotland) Peter de Boer	$30,000
2006	(Scotland) David Edwards	(Scotland) Tom Brewster	29,000
2007	(Canada) Randy Ferbey	(Canada) Glenn Howard	32,500
2008	(Canada) Glenn Howard	(Canada) Kerry Burtnyk	32,500
2009	(Canada) Kevin Koe	(Norway) Thomas Ulsrud	32,500
2010	(Scotland) Tom Brewster	(Sweden) Niklas Edin	32,500
2011	(Canada) Mike McEwen	(Scotland) Duncan Fernie	15,000
2012	(Canada) Mike McEwen	(Norway) Thomas Ulsrud	17,000
2013	(Norway) Thomas Ulsrud	(Canada) Mike McEwen	17,000
2014	(Scotland) Logan Gray	(Sweden) Oskar Eriksson	17,160
2015	(Canada) Brad Gushue	(Scotland) Kyle Smith	17,160
2016	(Canada) Kevin Koe	(Norway) Thomas Ulsrud	18,500
2017	(Scotland) Tom Brewster	(Norway) Steffen Walstad	18,500
2018	(Sweden) Niklas Edin	(Switzerland) Peter de Cruz	18,500
2019	(Scotland) Bruce Mouat	(Scotland) Glen Muirhead	18,700
2020	(Scotland) Bruce Mouat	(Canada) Mike McEwen	17,000
2021	Cancelled		
2022	Cancelled		
2023	(Scotland) Bruce Mouat	(Italy) Joël Retornaz	17,000
2024	(Scotland) Bruce Mouat	(Scotland) Ross Whyte	17,000
2025	(Scotland) Orrin Carson	(Scotland) Glen Muirhead	38,250
2026	(Scotland) Ross Whyte	(Italy) Stefano Spiller	38,250

=== Women ===
Year	Winning team	Runner up team	Purse (GBP)
2016	(Scotland) Eve Muirhead, Anna Sloan, Vicki Adams, Mairi Milne	(Switzerland) Silvana Tirinzoni, Manuela Siegrist, Esther Neuenschwander, Marlene Albrecht	14,400
2017	(Canada) Allison Flaxey, Clancy Grandy, Lynn Kreviazuk, Morgan Court	(Switzerland) Silvana Tirinzoni, Manuela Siegrist, Esther Neuenschwander, Marlene Albrecht	15,800
2018 (Mar.–Apr.)	(Scotland) Hannah Fleming, Jennifer Dodds, Alice Spence, Vicky Wright	(Sweden) Isabella Wranå, Jennie Wåhlin, Almida de Val, Fanny Sjöberg	15,800
2018 (Dec.)	(Switzerland) Michèle Jäggi (Fourth), Ursi Hegner (Skip), Nina Ledergerber, Claudia Baumann	(Switzerland) Irene Schori, Lara Stocker, Roxanne Heritier, Isabelle Maillard	10,500
2020	(Scotland) Eve Muirhead, Lauren Gray, Jennifer Dodds, Vicky Wright	(Scotland) Rebecca Morrison, Maggie Wilson, Jennifer Marshall, Eilidh Yeats	10,000
2021	Cancelled		
2022	Cancelled		
2023	(Germany) Daniela Jentsch, Emira Abbes, Lena Kapp, Analena Jentsch	(Norway) Kristin Skaslien (Fourth), Marianne Rørvik (Skip), Mille Haslev Nordbye, Martine Rønning	7,200
2024	(Canada) Clancy Grandy, Kayla MacMillan, Lindsay Dubue, Sarah Loken	(Scotland) Jackie Lockhart, Mairi Milne, Wendy Johnston, Katie Loudon	10,000
2025	(Switzerland) Xenia Schwaller, Selina Gafner, Fabienne Rieder, Selina Rychiger	(China) Wang Rui, Han Yu, Dong Ziqi, Jiang Jiayi, Su Tingyu	15,900
2026	(Denmark) Madeleine Dupont, Mathilde Halse, Denise Dupont, My Larsen	(Norway) Torild Bjørnstad, Nora Østgård, Ingeborg Forbregd, Eirin Mesloe	15,900
