= Glen Muirhead =

Scottish curler (born 1989)

- Curler
- Born: 10 April 1989 (age 37)

Team
- Curling club: Dunkeld CC
- Skip: Glen Muirhead
- Third: Thomas Muirhead
- Second: Jake MacDonald
- Lead: Stuart Stark

Curling career
- World Championship: 2 (2014, 2016)
- European Championship: 4 (2011, 2015, 2016, 2017)
- Olympic: 1 (2018)
Medal record
Curling
Representing Scotland
European Curling Championships
Silver medal – second place	2017 St Gallen
Scottish Men's Curling Championship
Gold medal – first place	2016 Perth
Silver medal – second place	2010 Perth
Silver medal – second place	2019 Perth
Silver medal – second place	2020 Perth
Bronze medal – third place	2009 Perth
Bronze medal – third place	2011 Perth
Bronze medal – third place	2014 Perth
Bronze medal – third place	2026 Dumfries

Glen Muirhead (born 10 April 1989) is a Scottish curler from Blair Atholl. He competed for Great Britain at the 2018 Winter Olympics in Pyeongchang, South Korea. Glen's brother Thomas and sister Eve are also British curlers, and their father Gordon is also a former professional curler.

== Career ==
Muirhead began his curling career playing for Logan Gray's team. In 2014, Glen and his brother Thomas joined Tom Brewster's curling team. In 2016, Glen competed against his brother Thomas, losing the match 4–2. In 2016, he was part of the Scotland team that reached the final of the Grand Slam of Curling. Muirhead was on the team that came second at the 2017 European Curling Championships. After finishing in the top eight at the 2017 World Curling Championships, Team Smith, led by Kyle Smith, qualified for the 2018 Winter Olympics in Pyeongchang, South Korea. (Note: Outside of the Winter Olympics, Great Britain competes under the flags of its constituent home nations, Scotland, England and Wales (Northern Irish players compete for a combined Ireland); Scotland results are treated as Great Britain for the purposes of Olympic qualification.) Muirhead was selected as the alternate for the 2018 Winter Olympics in Pyeongchang, South Korea. Glen's brother Thomas was chosen as the third for the men's curling team, and his sister Eve was chosen to skip the women's curling team. Muirhead did not make an appearance at the Games.

In the 2018–19 season, Muirhead was the skipper of the team that competed at the 2018 Olympics, which were named Team Muirhead for the season. In 2020, Muirhead's team came second at the Scottish Curling Championships. Later in the year, the Scottish Curling team's funding for the 2022 Winter Olympics was cut. Muirhead was not selected for the 2022 Winter Olympics, as Bruce Mouat's team were selected for the Games.

== Personal life ==
Glen Muirhead is the brother of Olympic gold medallist Eve Muirhead, and his brother Thomas is also a professional curler. Their father Gordon won a gold medal at the 1994 European Curling Championships and the 1999 World Curling Championships. Aside from curling, Glen and Thomas rear sheep near Crieff.
