= Curling at the 2026 Winter Olympics – Statistics =

Statistics for curling at the 2026 Winter Olympics.

== Percentages ==
In curling, each player is graded on their shots.

=== Men's tournament ===
Percentages by draw.

==== Lead ====
#	Curler	1	2	3	4	5	6	7	8	9	Total
1	Aidan Oldenburg (USA)	95	95	97	96	91	89	88	90	94	92.5
2	Pablo Lachat-Couchepin (SUI)	92	90	98	96	89	91	96	77	97	91.8
2	Hammy McMillan Jr. (GBR)	92	94	88	93	88	92	99	90	92	91.8
4	Ben Hebert (CAN)	89	92	91	96	94	88	92	89	–	91.4
5	Johannes Scheuerl (GER)	93	95	81	89	97	93	90	93	90	90.9
6	Christoffer Sundgren (SWE)	88	98	91	95	84	98	79	82	97	90.2
7	Lukáš Klípa (CZE)	93	75	98	91	91	86	91	83	89	89.2
8	Xu Jingtao (CHN)	79	88	89	88	96	96	83	90	84	87.6
9	Gaute Nepstad (NOR)	91	86	93	71	91	96	89	78	84	86.8
10	Mattia Giovanella (ITA)	98	84	98	83	85	86	75	93	72	85.9

==== Second ====
#	Curler	1	2	3	4	5	6	7	8	9	Total
1	Felix Messenzehl (GER)	86	89	86	88	81	90	86	91	90	87.4
2	Sebastiano Arman (ITA)	83	100	84	78	89	91	88	93	68	85.5
3	Sven Michel (SUI)	77	83	88	79	90	98	81	84	86	85.1
4	Rasmus Wranå (SWE)	81	86	84	93	83	83	88	86	78	84.4
5	Brett Gallant (CAN)	89	79	83	83	99	73	88	75	83	83.8
6	Bobby Lammie (GBR)	93	84	79	88	67	85	78	65	79	79.9
7	Ben Richardson (USA)	68	69	92	95	73	90	80	66	71	78.5
8	Li Zhichao (CHN)	79	91	71	75	71	96	63	89	74	78.2
9	Bendik Ramsfjell (NOR)	69	86	68	93	88	86	79	52	78	78.1
10	Martin Jurík (CZE)	74	70	78	66	89	78	69	74	84	75.5

==== Third ====
#	Curler	1	2	3	4	5	6	7	8	9	Total
1	Yannick Schwaller (SUI)	94	83	81	96	91	91	98	88	86	89.6
2	Grant Hardie (GBR)	79	84	91	85	97	93	91	89	85	88.7
3	Marc Kennedy (CAN)	82	92	90	78	92	89	79	83	84	85.3
4	Benjamin Kapp (GER)	89	98	86	88	74	89	79	69	85	84.4
5	Fei Xueqing (CHN)	90	84	80	83	74	91	79	89	74	82.2
6	Oskar Eriksson (SWE)	81	91	80	93	71	71	75	86	86	81.4
6	Amos Mosaner (ITA)	76	80	83	85	84	70	84	86	83	81.4
8	Marek Černovský (CZE)	86	69	68	76	93	89	88	82	81	81.3
9	Luc Violette (USA)	76	73	79	93	88	80	81	81	60	80.1
10	Martin Sesaker (NOR)	76	80	84	81	83	79	71	70	79	78.3

==== Fourth ====
#	Curler	1	2	3	4	5	6	7	8	9	Total
1	Benoît Schwarz-van Berkel (SUI)	97	100	81	97	77	96	88	80	86	88.5
2	Brad Jacobs (CAN)	93	90	89	85	82	88	83	86	79	86.2
3	Bruce Mouat (GBR)	93	94	84	86	86	84	84	69	90	85.1
4	Magnus Ramsfjell (NOR)	80	85	92	79	71	84	76	67	83	79.9
5	Joël Retornaz (ITA)	69	95	82	79	92	61	90	63	75	79.2
6	Xu Xiaoming (CHN)	69	78	81	88	72	92	84	63	73	77.5
7	Daniel Casper (USA)	81	70	76	81	81	78	67	74	69	75.8
8	Marc Muskatewitz (GER)	83	68	81	72	66	90	59	72	85	75.4
9	Niklas Edin (SWE)	69	61	79	99	63	76	75	81	53	74.2
10	Lukáš Klíma (CZE)	78	63	79	81	78	61	79	79	61	73.6

==== Alternate ====
#	Curler	1	2	3	4	5	6	7	8	9	Total
1	Rich Ruohonen (USA)	–	100 (1)	–	–	–	–	–	–	–	100.0
2	Kim Schwaller (SUI)	–	–	–	–	–	–	88 (1)	–	–	87.5
3	Tyler Tardi (CAN)	–	–	–	–	–	100 (1)	–	–	83 (1)	85.4
4	Simon Olofsson (SWE)	–	–	–	–	–	–	75 (2)	–	75 (2)	75.0
5	Radek Boháč (CZE)	–	50 (1)	–	–	–	88 (1)	–	–	–	68.8
6	Mario Trevisiol (GER)	–	–	–	–	–	–	–	50 (1)	–	50.0

==== Team total ====
#	Team	1	2	3	4	5	6	7	8	9	Total
1	Switzerland	90	89	87	92	87	94	91	82	89	88.7
2	Canada	88	88	88	85	92	85	85	83	82	86.5
3	Great Britain	89	89	85	88	84	89	88	78	86	86.4
4	Germany	88	87	84	84	80	90	78	80	88	84.4
4	Italy	81	90	87	81	88	77	84	83	75	83.0
6	Sweden	80	84	83	95	75	82	78	84	80	82.5
7	United States	80	77	86	91	83	84	79	78	73	81.7
8	China	80	85	80	83	78	94	77	83	76	81.4
9	Norway	79	84	84	81	83	86	79	67	81	80.8
10	Czech Republic	83	68	80	79	88	79	82	80	79	79.8

=== Women's tournament ===
Percentages by draw.

==== Lead ====
#	Curler	1	2	3	4	5	6	7	8	9	Total
1	Jiang Jiayi (CHN)	99	96	96	83	93	99	73	95	95	92.0
2	Sophie Jackson (GBR)	85	83	92	99	95	92	88	92	90	90.6
3	Selina Witschonke (SUI)	97	90	84	90	83	93	88	85	92	88.9
4	Taylor Anderson-Heide (USA)	85	88	94	89	76	97	83	88	90	87.6
5	Sofia Scharback (SWE)	90	79	89	88	94	89	74	83	92	86.1
6	Anna Ohmiya (JPN)	86	75	86	99	83	93	81	73	93	85.3
7	Sarah Wilkes (CAN)	73	79	91	83	96	80	93	82	88	85.1
8	Seol Ye-eun (KOR)	80	77	89	88	90	81	91	68	94	84.9
9	Giulia Zardini Lacedelli (ITA)	78	88	78	91	92	88	88	78 (2)	84 (2)	84.5
10	Denise Dupont (DEN)	73	86	79	79	95	86	80	64	78	79.7

==== Second ====
#	Curler	1	2	3	4	5	6	7	8	9	Total
1	Carole Howald (SUI)	88	85	81	78	91	88	95	76	85	85.1
2	Agnes Knochenhauer (SWE)	88	85	90	73	95	90	78	75	70	83.0
3	Kim Su-ji (KOR)	71	84	78	84	84	79	–	93	80	81.1
4	Dong Ziqi (CHN)	75	80	88	85	78	81	75	75	91	81.0
5	Marta Lo Deserto (ITA)	85	68	80	78	73	96	80	–	–	80.4
6	Tara Peterson (USA)	81	80	83	90	83	75	89	82	65	80.3
7	Sophie Sinclair (GBR)	89	67	80	85	83	72	66	98	79	79.8
8	Yuna Kotani (JPN)	93	75	75	81	75	71	–	78	80	78.2
9	Emma Miskew (CAN)	77	76	81	80	83	81	83	64	80	78.1
10	Jasmin Holtermann (DEN)	68	61	79	79	91	81	64	79	89	76.7

==== Third ====
#	Curler	1	2	3	4	5	6	7	8	9	Total
1	Silvana Tirinzoni (SUI)	92	79	84	72	88	89	93	83	89	84.9
2	Han Yu (CHN)	85	86	79	90	83	84	80	80	84	83.5
3	Kim Min-ji (KOR)	86	89	86	76	89	93	73	79	78	82.9
4	Jennifer Dodds (GBR)	84	83	84	81	91	79	64	88	85	81.6
5	Cory Thiesse (USA)	83	91	75	81	80	72	78	88	77	80.6
6	Tracy Fleury (CAN)	82	71	91	75	85	81	81	78	71	79.3
7	Sara McManus (SWE)	89	79	80	75	88	85	70	61	70	78.0
8	Kaho Onodera (JPN)	74	75	73	85	86	73	74	86	79	77.9
9	Elena Mathis (ITA)	71	70	73	79	84	94	68	81	79	77.7
10	Mathilde Halse (DEN)	68	77	83	71	78	67	75	70	86	75.5

==== Fourth ====
#	Curler	1	2	3	4	5	6	7	8	9	Total
1	Rebecca Morrison (GBR)	71	63	88	76	98	90	69	88	94	81.6
2	Alina Pätz (SUI)	96	85	64	69	80	88	84	85	82	80.8
3	Anna Hasselborg (SWE)	85	82	79	89	91	86	71	55	77	80.3
4	Tabitha Peterson (USA)	75	74	85	96	71	74	77	78	89	79.8
5	Rachel Homan (CAN)	68	79	70	81	85	84	78	77	85	78.7
6	Gim Eun-ji (KOR)	70	75	83	66	90	76	75	77	83	77.2
7	Madeleine Dupont (DEN)	73	69	80	79	89	73	64	70	86	75.9
8	Wang Rui (CHN)	84	68	81	75	69	84	65	67	73	74.3
9	Sayaka Yoshimura (JPN)	67	66	83	69	84	73	71	58	85	73.1
10	Stefania Constantini (ITA)	75	61	80	64	66	92	68	74	71	72.6

==== Alternate ====
#	Curler	1	2	3	4	5	6	7	8	9	Total
1	Rebecca Mariani (ITA)	–	–	–	–	–	–	–	74 (1)	86 (1)	79.8
2	Mina Kobayashi (JPN)	–	–	–	–	–	–	76 (2)	–	–	76.3
3	Johanna Heldin (SWE)	–	–	–	–	100 (1)	–	–	50 (1)	–	71.4
4	Seol Ye-ji (KOR)	–	–	–	–	–	–	70 (2)	–	–	70.0

==== Team total ====
#	Team	1	2	3	4	5	6	7	8	9	Total
1	Switzerland	93	85	78	77	85	89	90	82	87	85.0
2	Great Britain	82	74	86	85	92	83	72	91	87	83.4
3	China	86	83	86	83	81	87	73	79	86	82.7
4	United States	81	83	84	89	78	80	82	84	80	82.1
5	Sweden	88	81	84	81	92	88	73	66	77	81.7
6	South Korea	77	81	84	78	88	82	77	79	83	81.2
7	Canada	75	76	83	80	87	82	83	75	81	80.3
8	Italy	77	71	78	78	79	92	76	77	80	78.8
9	Japan	80	73	79	83	82	77	76	74	84	78.6
10	Denmark	71	74	80	77	88	77	71	71	84	77.0

=== Mixed doubles tournament ===
Percentages by draw.

==== Female ====
#	Curler	1	2	3	4	5	6	7	8	9	Total
1	Jennifer Dodds (GBR)	80	86	78	83	77	78	91	84	77	81.4
2	Cory Thiesse (USA)	78	92	80	98	64	63	73	90	89	80.4
3	Isabella Wranå (SWE)	92	92	80	65	48	86	79	88	84	80.0
4	Stefania Constantini (ITA)	75	63	69	80	77	77	98	84	89	79.2
5	Jocelyn Peterman (CAN)	88	78	83	88	67	65	75	72	79	76.7
6	Briar Schwaller-Hürlimann (SUI)	78	55	94	52	70	86	80	72	75	74.3
7	Kristin Skaslien (NOR)	58	77	72	90	67	73	66	70	77	71.5
8	Marie Kaldvee (EST)	71	55	78	64	72	78	64	72	66	69.2
9	Kim Seon-yeong (KOR)	67	57	72	39	63	79	86	78	75	68.8
10	Julie Zelingrová (CZE)	64	84	69	60	82	61	73	50	69	68.6

==== Male ====
#	Curler	1	2	3	4	5	6	7	8	9	Total
1	Korey Dropkin (USA)	80	77	91	85	77	81	90	89	95	84.9
2	Magnus Nedregotten (NOR)	90	73	74	83	79	77	79	92	80	80.7
3	Rasmus Wranå (SWE)	86	77	71	74	68	80	92	82	92	80.3
4	Brett Gallant (CAN)	88	72	82	80	78	75	65	81	97	79.6
5	Jeong Yeong-seok (KOR)	78	66	79	75	78	87	82	82	84	79.3
6	Bruce Mouat (GBR)	74	74	65	77	80	85	85	79	85	78.3
7	Amos Mosaner (ITA)	82	64	86	94	62	69	85	72	84	77.7
8	Yannick Schwaller (SUI)	63	72	86	61	79	88	77	72	73	74.6
9	Harri Lill (EST)	82	80	75	61	71	68	75	69	78	73.2
10	Vít Chabičovský (CZE)	55	56	78	68	75	73	82	68	69	69.4

==== Team total ====
#	Team	1	2	3	4	5	6	7	8	9	Total
1	United States	79	83	87	90	72	74	83	89	93	83.1
2	Sweden	88	83	74	71	60	83	86	84	89	80.1
3	Great Britain	76	79	70	79	79	83	88	81	82	79.6
4	Canada	88	74	83	83	74	71	69	78	90	78.5
5	Italy	79	63	79	88	68	72	90	76	86	78.3
6	Norway	77	74	73	86	74	76	74	83	79	77.1
7	South Korea	73	62	76	61	72	84	84	81	81	75.1
8	Switzerland	69	66	89	58	76	87	78	72	74	74.5
9	Estonia	78	70	76	63	71	72	71	70	73	71.6
10	Czech Republic	59	66	74	65	78	68	78	60	69	69.1
