= 2023 Mercure Perth Masters =

- Host city: Perth, Scotland
- Arena: Dewars Centre
- Dates: 4–7 January
- Men's winner: (Scotland) Team Mouat
- Curling club: Gogar Park CC, Edinburgh
- Skip: Bruce Mouat
- Third: Grant Hardie
- Second: Bobby Lammie
- Lead: Hammy McMillan Jr.
- Finalist: (Italy) Joël Retornaz
- Women's winner: (Germany) Team Jentsch
- Curling club: CC Füssen, Füssen
- Skip: Daniela Jentsch
- Third: Emira Abbes
- Second: Lena Kapp
- Lead: Analena Jentsch
- Finalist: (Norway) Marianne Rørvik

The 2023 Mercure Perth Masters were held from 4 to 7 January at the Dewars Centre in Perth, Scotland. The total purse for the event was £ 17,000 on the men's side and £ 7,200 on the women's side.

== Men ==
=== Teams ===
The teams are listed as follows:

Skip	Third	Second	Lead	Alternate	Locale
Michael Brunner	Romano Meier	Anthony Petoud	Marcel Käufeler		Bern, Switzerland
Cameron Bryce	Duncan Menzies	Luke Carson	Robin McCall		Stirling, Scotland
Orrin Carson	Logan Carson	Archie Hyslop	Charlie Gibb		Dumfries, Scotland
James Craik	Mark Watt	Angus Bryce	Blair Haswell		Stirling, Scotland
Pat Ferris	Connor Lawes	Connor Duhaime	Robert Currie	Evan Lilly	(Canada) Grimsby, Ontario
Wouter Gösgens	Jaap van Dorp	Laurens Hoekman	Tobias van den Hurk	Alexander Magan	Zoetermeer, Netherlands
Andreas Hårstad	Michael Mellemseter	Willhelm Næss	Emil M. Kvål		Oppdal, Norway
Marco Hösli	Philipp Hösli	Marco Hefti	Justin Hausherr		Glarus, Switzerland
Grunde Buraas (Fourth)	Lukas Høstmælingen (Skip)	Magnus Lillebø	Tinius Haslev Nordbye		Oslo, Norway
Benjamin Kapp	Felix Messenzehl	Johannes Scheuerl	Mario Trevisiol		Füssen / Oberstdorf, Germany
Lukáš Klíma	Marek Černovský	Radek Boháč	Martin Jurík	Lukáš Klípa	Prague, Czech Republic
Ewan MacDonald					Perth, Scotland
Bruce Mouat	Grant Hardie	Bobby Lammie	Hammy McMillan Jr.		Stirling, Scotland
Glen Muirhead	Thomas Muirhead	Callum Kinnear	Scott Andrews		Perth, Scotland
Magnus Ramsfjell	Martin Sesaker	Bendik Ramsfjell	Gaute Nepstad		Trondheim, Norway
Joël Retornaz	Amos Mosaner	Sebastiano Arman	Mattia Giovanella		Trentino, Italy
Andrin Schnider	Nicola Stoll	Noé Traub	Tom Winklehausen		Schaffhausen, Switzerland
Jan Hess (Fourth)	Yves Stocker (Skip)	Simon Gloor	Felix Eberhard		Zug, Switzerland
Jack Strawhorn	Hamish Gallacher	Kaleb Johnston	Rory Macnair		Dumfries, Scotland
Sixten Totzek	Klaudius Harsch	Magnus Sutor	Dominik Greindl		Munich, Germany
Kyle Waddell	Craig Waddell	Mark Taylor	Gavin Barr		Glasgow, Scotland
Steffen Walstad	Magnus Nedregotten	Mathias Brænden	Magnus Vågberg		Oppdal, Norway
Ross Whyte	Robin Brydone	Duncan McFadzean	Euan Kyle		Stirling, Scotland
Riku Yanagisawa	Tsuyoshi Yamaguchi	Takeru Yamamoto	Satoshi Koizumi		Karuizawa, Japan

=== Round-robin standings ===
Final round-robin standings

Key
Teams to Playoffs

Pool A	W	L	PF	PA
(Scotland) Glen Muirhead	4	1	28	20
(Scotland) Kyle Waddell	3	2	28	24
(Norway) Lukas Høstmælingen	3	2	28	27
(Scotland) Orrin Carson	2	3	27	26
(Canada) Pat Ferris	2	3	21	29
(Switzerland) Marco Hösli	1	4	25	31

Pool B	W	L	PF	PA
(Scotland) Bruce Mouat	5	0	38	22
(Scotland) Cameron Bryce	4	1	30	17
(Switzerland) Michael Brunner	2	3	26	29
(Netherlands) Wouter Gösgens	2	3	28	30
(Japan) Riku Yanagisawa	2	3	21	32
(Norway) Andreas Hårstad	0	5	23	36

Pool C	W	L	PF	PA
(Scotland) James Craik	4	1	34	22
(Italy) Joël Retornaz	4	1	33	13
(Switzerland) Yves Stocker	3	2	19	20
(Norway) Magnus Ramsfjell	2	3	21	29
(Germany) Sixten Totzek	1	4	17	31
(Scotland) Jack Strawhorn	1	4	18	27

Pool D	W	L	PF	PA
(Scotland) Ross Whyte	5	0	38	15
(Norway) Steffen Walstad	4	1	33	20
(Czech Republic) Lukáš Klíma	2	3	24	24
(Switzerland) Andrin Schnider	2	3	18	25
(Germany) Benjamin Kapp	2	3	21	30
(Scotland) Ewan MacDonald	0	5	9	29

=== Round-robin results ===
All draw times are listed in Greenwich Mean Time (UTC+00:00).

==== Draw 2 ====
Wednesday, 4 January, 6:00 pm

Sheet B	1	2	3	4	5	6	7	8	9	Final
(Canada) Pat Ferris 🔨	0	1	0	0	3	0	0	1	0	5
(Norway) Lukas Høstmælingen	0	0	2	1	0	1	1	0	1	6

Sheet C	1	2	3	4	5	6	7	8	Final
(Scotland) Glen Muirhead 🔨	2	0	3	0	0	0	1	X	6
(Scotland) Kyle Waddell	0	0	0	0	2	0	0	X	2

Sheet D	1	2	3	4	5	6	7	8	Final
(Switzerland) Marco Hösli 🔨	2	0	0	0	0	0	2	0	4
(Scotland) Orrin Carson	0	0	0	2	1	2	0	3	8

Sheet E	1	2	3	4	5	6	7	8	Final
(Scotland) Bruce Mouat 🔨	3	0	0	1	3	0	X	X	7
(Japan) Riku Yanagisawa	0	0	1	0	0	2	X	X	3

Sheet F	1	2	3	4	5	6	7	8	Final
(Switzerland) Michael Brunner	0	0	2	1	0	1	0	1	5
(Norway) Andreas Hårstad 🔨	0	1	0	0	1	0	2	0	4

Sheet G	1	2	3	4	5	6	7	8	Final
(Netherlands) Wouter Gösgens 🔨	1	0	0	0	1	0	0	X	2
(Scotland) Cameron Bryce	0	1	1	1	0	2	2	X	7

==== Draw 3 ====
Wednesday, 4 January, 8:30 pm

Sheet A	1	2	3	4	5	6	7	8	Final
(Italy) Joël Retornaz	1	0	0	0	2	0	2	0	5
(Scotland) James Craik 🔨	0	1	2	1	0	1	0	2	7

Sheet B	1	2	3	4	5	6	7	8	Final
(Norway) Magnus Ramsfjell	1	1	0	0	1	1	0	1	5
(Scotland) Jack Strawhorn 🔨	0	0	1	1	0	0	2	0	4

Sheet C	1	2	3	4	5	6	7	8	Final
(Switzerland) Yves Stocker 🔨	1	0	3	1	0	1	X	X	6
(Germany) Sixten Totzek	0	1	0	0	2	0	X	X	3

Sheet D	1	2	3	4	5	6	7	8	Final
(Norway) Steffen Walstad	0	1	2	0	2	0	2	X	7
(Czech Republic) Lukáš Klíma 🔨	2	0	0	1	0	1	0	X	4

Sheet E	1	2	3	4	5	6	7	8	Final
(Scotland) Ross Whyte	0	1	1	0	4	0	3	X	9
(Switzerland) Andrin Schnider 🔨	2	0	0	1	0	2	0	X	5

Sheet F	1	2	3	4	5	6	7	8	Final
(Scotland) Ewan MacDonald 🔨	2	0	0	0	1	1	0	X	4
(Germany) Benjamin Kapp	0	1	2	2	0	0	2	X	7

==== Draw 4 ====
Thursday, 5 January, 8:00 am

Sheet A	1	2	3	4	5	6	7	8	Final
(Scotland) Bruce Mouat 🔨	3	0	2	3	0	X	X	X	8
(Scotland) Cameron Bryce	0	2	0	0	1	X	X	X	3

Sheet B	1	2	3	4	5	6	7	8	Final
(Switzerland) Michael Brunner	0	1	0	2	0	5	0	X	8
(Japan) Riku Yanagisawa 🔨	1	0	1	0	2	0	1	X	5

Sheet C	1	2	3	4	5	6	7	8	Final
(Netherlands) Wouter Gösgens	0	4	0	3	2	0	2	X	11
(Norway) Andreas Hårstad 🔨	2	0	2	0	0	2	0	X	6

Sheet D	1	2	3	4	5	6	7	8	Final
(Canada) Pat Ferris 🔨	0	2	0	3	0	1	1	X	7
(Scotland) Kyle Waddell	2	0	2	0	0	0	0	X	4

Sheet E	1	2	3	4	5	6	7	8	Final
(Switzerland) Marco Hösli 🔨	1	0	3	0	2	1	X	X	7
(Norway) Lukas Høstmælingen	0	1	0	1	0	0	X	X	2

Sheet F	1	2	3	4	5	6	7	8	Final
(Scotland) Glen Muirhead	0	2	0	0	1	0	2	1	6
(Scotland) Orrin Carson 🔨	1	0	0	1	0	3	0	0	5

==== Draw 5 ====
Thursday, 5 January, 10:45 am

Sheet C	1	2	3	4	5	6	7	8	Final
(Norway) Steffen Walstad	0	2	0	0	1	1	3	X	7
(Switzerland) Andrin Schnider 🔨	0	0	2	1	0	0	0	X	3

Sheet D	1	2	3	4	5	6	7	8	Final
(Norway) Magnus Ramsfjell 🔨	0	0	2	0	2	1	0	X	5
(Scotland) James Craik	0	2	0	2	0	0	4	X	8

Sheet E	1	2	3	4	5	6	7	8	Final
(Scotland) Ewan MacDonald	0	1	0	0	2	0	X	X	3
(Czech Republic) Lukáš Klíma 🔨	2	0	1	1	0	3	X	X	7

Sheet F	1	2	3	4	5	6	7	8	Final
(Italy) Joël Retornaz 🔨	3	2	2	0	X	X	X	X	7
(Germany) Sixten Totzek	0	0	0	1	X	X	X	X	1

Sheet G	1	2	3	4	5	6	7	8	Final
(Scotland) Ross Whyte	1	1	1	0	1	0	3	X	7
(Germany) Benjamin Kapp 🔨	0	0	0	1	0	2	0	X	3

Sheet H	1	2	3	4	5	6	7	8	9	Final
(Switzerland) Yves Stocker	0	0	1	0	0	1	0	1	0	3
(Scotland) Jack Strawhorn 🔨	0	0	0	2	0	0	1	0	1	4

==== Draw 6 ====
Thursday, 5 January, 2:00 pm

Sheet A	1	2	3	4	5	6	7	8	Final
(Switzerland) Michael Brunner 🔨	1	0	1	0	1	0	2	0	5
(Netherlands) Wouter Gösgens	0	2	0	2	0	1	0	1	6

Sheet B	1	2	3	4	5	6	7	8	Final
(Norway) Andreas Hårstad	0	1	2	0	2	1	0	0	6
(Scotland) Bruce Mouat 🔨	2	0	0	3	0	0	2	1	8

Sheet C	1	2	3	4	5	6	7	8	Final
(Japan) Riku Yanagisawa	0	0	1	0	0	1	0	X	2
(Scotland) Cameron Bryce 🔨	0	2	0	1	1	0	4	X	8

Sheet F	1	2	3	4	5	6	7	8	Final
(Norway) Lukas Høstmælingen 🔨	1	0	1	0	1	0	0	X	3
(Scotland) Kyle Waddell	0	1	0	3	0	2	1	X	7

Sheet G	1	2	3	4	5	6	7	8	Final
(Switzerland) Marco Hösli 🔨	2	0	0	0	1	0	0	0	3
(Scotland) Glen Muirhead	0	2	1	0	0	1	1	1	6

Sheet H	1	2	3	4	5	6	7	8	Final
(Scotland) Orrin Carson	0	0	1	0	4	2	X	X	7
(Canada) Pat Ferris 🔨	0	1	0	0	0	0	X	X	1

==== Draw 7 ====
Thursday, 5 January, 4:30 pm

Sheet A	1	2	3	4	5	6	7	8	Final
(Norway) Steffen Walstad	0	1	2	0	2	2	X	X	7
(Scotland) Ewan MacDonald 🔨	0	0	0	1	0	0	X	X	1

Sheet B	1	2	3	4	5	6	7	8	Final
(Czech Republic) Lukáš Klíma	0	1	0	1	X	X	X	X	2
(Scotland) Ross Whyte 🔨	3	0	3	0	X	X	X	X	6

Sheet D	1	2	3	4	5	6	7	8	Final
(Switzerland) Andrin Schnider 🔨	2	2	1	2	0	X	X	X	7
(Germany) Benjamin Kapp	0	0	0	0	2	X	X	X	2

Sheet E	1	2	3	4	5	6	7	8	Final
(Scotland) James Craik	0	5	0	0	2	4	X	X	11
(Germany) Sixten Totzek 🔨	1	0	3	0	0	0	X	X	4

Sheet F	1	2	3	4	5	6	7	8	9	Final
(Norway) Magnus Ramsfjell	0	1	0	0	1	0	3	0	0	5
(Switzerland) Yves Stocker 🔨	0	0	0	2	0	1	0	2	1	6

Sheet G	1	2	3	4	5	6	7	8	Final
(Scotland) Jack Strawhorn	0	0	1	0	0	3	0	X	4
(Italy) Joël Retornaz 🔨	0	2	0	1	3	0	2	X	8

==== Draw 8 ====
Friday, 6 January, 8:30 am

Sheet A	1	2	3	4	5	6	7	8	Final
(Germany) Sixten Totzek 🔨	0	1	0	0	1	0	2	0	4
(Norway) Magnus Ramsfjell	0	0	1	0	0	2	0	2	5

Sheet B	1	2	3	4	5	6	7	8	Final
(Scotland) Glen Muirhead 🔨	1	1	1	0	3	X	X	X	6
(Canada) Pat Ferris	0	0	0	1	0	X	X	X	1

Sheet C	1	2	3	4	5	6	7	8	Final
(Scotland) Ewan MacDonald	0	1	0	X	X	X	X	X	1
(Scotland) Ross Whyte 🔨	4	0	4	X	X	X	X	X	8

Sheet D	1	2	3	4	5	6	7	8	Final
(Switzerland) Yves Stocker	0	0	X	X	X	X	X	X	0
(Italy) Joël Retornaz 🔨	1	5	X	X	X	X	X	X	6

Sheet E	1	2	3	4	5	6	7	8	Final
(Netherlands) Wouter Gösgens	0	0	2	0	2	0	1	0	5
(Scotland) Bruce Mouat 🔨	0	2	0	1	0	3	0	1	7

Sheet F	1	2	3	4	5	6	7	8	Final
(Scotland) Jack Strawhorn 🔨	3	0	0	1	0	0	0	X	4
(Scotland) James Craik	0	2	1	0	1	1	1	X	6

Sheet G	1	2	3	4	5	6	7	8	Final
(Germany) Benjamin Kapp	0	0	2	0	1	1	0	0	4
(Norway) Steffen Walstad 🔨	2	0	0	2	0	0	1	3	8

Sheet H	1	2	3	4	5	6	7	8	Final
(Czech Republic) Lukáš Klíma 🔨	0	1	0	0	2	4	0	X	7
(Switzerland) Andrin Schnider	1	0	0	1	0	0	1	X	3

==== Draw 9 ====
Friday, 6 January, 11:15 am

Sheet A	1	2	3	4	5	6	7	8	Final
(Norway) Andreas Hårstad 🔨	0	0	1	0	3	0	1	0	5
(Japan) Riku Yanagisawa	0	0	0	2	0	2	0	2	6

Sheet D	1	2	3	4	5	6	7	8	Final
(Scotland) Cameron Bryce	0	1	1	0	0	4	0	X	6
(Switzerland) Michael Brunner 🔨	0	0	0	1	1	0	1	X	3

Sheet F	1	2	3	4	5	6	7	8	Final
(Scotland) Orrin Carson	0	1	0	2	0	1	0	X	4
(Norway) Lukas Høstmælingen 🔨	3	0	1	0	2	0	2	X	8

Sheet H	1	2	3	4	5	6	7	8	Final
(Scotland) Kyle Waddell	0	0	1	0	3	0	0	4	8
(Switzerland) Marco Hösli 🔨	1	1	0	1	0	1	1	0	5

==== Draw 10 ====
Friday, 6 January, 2:45 pm

Sheet A	1	2	3	4	5	6	7	8	Final
(Germany) Benjamin Kapp	0	1	1	0	0	1	0	2	5
(Czech Republic) Lukáš Klíma 🔨	1	0	0	0	2	0	1	0	4

Sheet C	1	2	3	4	5	6	7	8	Final
(Scotland) James Craik 🔨	0	1	0	0	0	0	1	X	2
(Switzerland) Yves Stocker	0	0	1	1	0	2	0	X	4

Sheet D	1	2	3	4	5	6	7	8	Final
(Germany) Sixten Totzek 🔨	0	1	2	0	0	1	1	X	5
(Scotland) Jack Strawhorn	0	0	0	1	1	0	0	X	2

Sheet E	1	2	3	4	5	6	7	8	Final
(Italy) Joël Retornaz	1	2	0	0	2	2	X	X	7
(Norway) Magnus Ramsfjell 🔨	0	0	0	1	0	0	X	X	1

Sheet G	Final
(Switzerland) Andrin Schnider 🔨	W
(Scotland) Ewan MacDonald	L

Sheet H	1	2	3	4	5	6	7	8	Final
(Scotland) Ross Whyte	0	3	0	3	0	2	X	X	8
(Norway) Steffen Walstad 🔨	1	0	1	0	2	0	X	X	4

==== Draw 11 ====
Friday, 6 January, 5:30 pm

Sheet A	1	2	3	4	5	6	7	8	Final
(Scotland) Kyle Waddell	0	0	0	2	0	0	2	3	7
(Scotland) Orrin Carson 🔨	0	0	1	0	2	0	0	0	3

Sheet B	1	2	3	4	5	6	7	8	Final
(Scotland) Bruce Mouat	0	1	0	4	1	0	2	X	8
(Switzerland) Michael Brunner 🔨	1	0	3	0	0	1	0	X	5

Sheet C	1	2	3	4	5	6	7	8	Final
(Norway) Lukas Høstmælingen 🔨	0	4	0	2	0	3	X	X	9
(Scotland) Glen Muirhead	0	0	1	0	3	0	X	X	4

Sheet E	1	2	3	4	5	6	7	8	Final
(Scotland) Cameron Bryce	0	2	1	0	2	1	X	X	6
(Norway) Andreas Hårstad 🔨	1	0	0	1	0	0	X	X	2

Sheet F	1	2	3	4	5	6	7	8	9	Final
(Canada) Pat Ferris 🔨	1	1	0	2	0	2	0	0	1	7
(Switzerland) Marco Hösli	0	0	2	0	1	0	2	1	0	6

Sheet H	1	2	3	4	5	6	7	8	9	Final
(Japan) Riku Yanagisawa	0	1	0	0	2	0	1	0	1	5
(Netherlands) Wouter Gösgens 🔨	1	0	0	1	0	1	0	1	0	4

=== Playoffs ===
Quarterfinals
1	(Scotland) Bruce Mouat	6
8	(Scotland) Kyle Waddell	2
4	(Scotland) Glen Muirhead	6
5	(Scotland) Cameron Bryce	2
3	(Scotland) James Craik	7
6	(Norway) Steffen Walstad	5
2	(Scotland) Ross Whyte	2
7	(Italy) Joël Retornaz	9

Semifinals
1	(Scotland) Bruce Mouat	8
4	(Scotland) Glen Muirhead	2
3	(Scotland) James Craik	2
7	(Italy) Joël Retornaz	3

Final
1	(Scotland) Bruce Mouat	5
7	(Italy) Joël Retornaz	4

==== Quarterfinals ====
Saturday, 7 January, 8:00 am

Team	1	2	3	4	5	6	7	8	Final
(Scotland) Bruce Mouat 🔨	0	2	0	0	4	0	X	X	6
(Scotland) Kyle Waddell	0	0	1	0	0	1	X	X	2

Team	1	2	3	4	5	6	7	8	Final
(Scotland) Glen Muirhead 🔨	2	0	1	1	1	0	1	X	6
(Scotland) Cameron Bryce	0	1	0	0	0	1	0	X	2

Team	1	2	3	4	5	6	7	8	Final
(Scotland) James Craik	0	3	0	2	0	1	0	1	7
(Norway) Steffen Walstad 🔨	2	0	1	0	1	0	1	0	5

Team	1	2	3	4	5	6	7	8	Final
(Scotland) Ross Whyte	0	2	0	0	0	0	X	X	2
(Italy) Joël Retornaz 🔨	0	0	0	2	4	3	X	X	9

==== Semifinals ====
Saturday, 7 January, 11:00 am

Team	1	2	3	4	5	6	7	8	Final
(Scotland) Bruce Mouat 🔨	1	0	2	2	0	3	X	X	8
(Scotland) Glen Muirhead	0	1	0	0	1	0	X	X	2

Team	1	2	3	4	5	6	7	8	Final
(Scotland) James Craik 🔨	1	0	0	0	0	1	0	0	2
(Italy) Joël Retornaz	0	0	0	2	0	0	0	1	3

==== Final ====
Saturday, 7 January, 3:30 pm

Team	1	2	3	4	5	6	7	8	Final
(Scotland) Bruce Mouat 🔨	0	0	1	0	1	0	0	3	5
(Italy) Joël Retornaz	0	0	0	1	0	2	1	0	4

== Women ==
=== Teams ===
The teams are listed as follows:

Skip	Third	Second	Lead	Alternate	Locale
Lucy Blair	Alexandra MacKintosh	Holly Hamilton	Susie Smith	Lisa Davie	Stirling, Scotland
Stefania Constantini	Marta Lo Deserto	Angela Romei	Giulia Zardini Lacedelli		Cortina d'Ampezzo, Italy
Moa Dryburgh	Thea Orefjord	Moa Tjärnlund	Moa Nilsson		Sundbyberg, Sweden
Beth Farmer	Hailey Duff	Kirstin Bousie	Katie McMillan	Amy MacDonald	Stirling, Scotland
Fay Henderson	Holly Wilkie-Milne	Robyn Munro	Laura Watt		Dumfries, Scotland
Daniela Jentsch	Emira Abbes	Lena Kapp (Note: Lena Kapp spared for Mia Höhne.)	Analena Jentsch		Füssen, Germany
Jodi Leigh Bass	Cara Davidson	Holly Burke	Erin Furey		Dumfries, Scotland
Jackie Lockhart	Mairi Milne	Wendy Johnston	Katie Loudon		Perth, Scotland
Amy Mitchell	Robyn Mitchell	Hannah Farries	Kristy Gallacher		Greenacres, Scotland
Rebecca Morrison	Gina Aitken	Sophie Sinclair	Sophie Jackson		Stirling, Scotland
Kristin Skaslien (Fourth)	Marianne Rørvik (Skip)	Mille Haslev Nordbye	Martine Rønning		Oslo, Norway
Alžběta Zelingrová	Aneta Müllerová	Michaela Baudyšová	Klára Svatoňová		Prague, Czech Republic

=== Round-robin standings ===
Final round-robin standings

Key
Teams to Playoffs

Pool A	W	L	PF	PA
(Scotland) Rebecca Morrison	4	1	29	19
(Scotland) Jackie Lockhart	3	2	28	25
(Norway) Marianne Rørvik	3	2	32	19
(Scotland) Fay Henderson	3	2	29	22
(Czech Republic) Alžběta Zelingrová	2	3	27	29
(Scotland) Jodi Leigh Bass	0	5	10	41

Pool B	W	L	PF	PA
(Germany) Daniela Jentsch	5	0	42	18
(Italy) Stefania Constantini	3	2	33	16
(Sweden) Moa Dryburgh	3	2	20	22
(Scotland) Lucy Blair	2	3	22	33
(Scotland) Beth Farmer	2	3	24	29
(Scotland) Amy Mitchell	0	5	12	35

=== Round-robin results ===
All draw times are listed in Greenwich Mean Time (UTC+00:00).

==== Draw 1 ====
Wednesday, 4 January, 1:30 pm

Sheet B	1	2	3	4	5	6	7	8	Final
(Germany) Daniela Jentsch 🔨	1	3	2	1	1	1	0	X	9
(Scotland) Amy Mitchell	0	0	0	0	0	0	2	X	2

Sheet D	1	2	3	4	5	6	7	8	Final
(Sweden) Moa Dryburgh 🔨	0	0	1	0	0	1	0	X	2
(Italy) Stefania Constantini	0	1	0	4	1	0	0	X	6

Sheet E	1	2	3	4	5	6	7	8	Final
(Scotland) Jackie Lockhart 🔨	1	2	1	0	2	1	0	X	7
(Scotland) Fay Henderson	0	0	0	2	0	0	1	X	3

Sheet G	1	2	3	4	5	6	7	8	Final
(Scotland) Rebecca Morrison	0	5	0	0	1	0	0	0	6
(Scotland) Jodi Leigh Bass 🔨	1	0	1	2	0	1	0	0	5

==== Draw 2 ====
Wednesday, 4 January, 6:00 pm

Sheet A	1	2	3	4	5	6	7	8	Final
(Norway) Marianne Rørvik	0	0	2	0	0	8	X	X	10
(Czech Republic) Alžběta Zelingrová 🔨	0	1	0	1	0	0	X	X	2

Sheet H	1	2	3	4	5	6	7	8	Final
(Scotland) Beth Farmer 🔨	0	2	0	0	0	0	1	X	3
(Scotland) Lucy Blair	0	0	1	2	2	1	0	X	6

==== Draw 3 ====
Wednesday, 4 January, 8:30 pm

Sheet G	1	2	3	4	5	6	7	8	Final
(Germany) Daniela Jentsch 🔨	1	0	0	1	1	0	0	4	7
(Sweden) Moa Dryburgh	0	1	0	0	0	2	1	0	4

Sheet H	1	2	3	4	5	6	7	8	9	Final
(Scotland) Rebecca Morrison	1	0	0	1	2	0	1	0	0	5
(Scotland) Fay Henderson 🔨	0	0	2	0	0	1	0	2	1	6

==== Draw 4 ====
Thursday, 5 January, 8:00 am

Sheet G	1	2	3	4	5	6	7	8	Final
(Scotland) Beth Farmer 🔨	2	0	1	2	0	1	X	X	6
(Scotland) Amy Mitchell	0	1	0	0	1	0	X	X	2

Sheet H	1	2	3	4	5	6	7	8	Final
(Norway) Marianne Rørvik 🔨	5	1	1	2	0	0	X	X	9
(Scotland) Jodi Leigh Bass	0	0	0	0	1	0	X	X	1

==== Draw 5 ====
Thursday, 5 January, 10:45 am

Sheet A	1	2	3	4	5	6	7	8	Final
(Sweden) Moa Dryburgh	0	0	2	0	0	2	0	1	5
(Scotland) Lucy Blair 🔨	1	1	0	1	0	0	1	0	4

Sheet B	1	2	3	4	5	6	7	8	Final
(Scotland) Fay Henderson 🔨	2	1	0	0	0	0	3	X	6
(Czech Republic) Alžběta Zelingrová	0	0	1	0	1	1	0	X	3

==== Draw 6 ====
Thursday, 5 January, 2:00 pm

Sheet D	1	2	3	4	5	6	7	8	Final
(Germany) Daniela Jentsch	0	3	0	1	2	0	5	X	11
(Scotland) Beth Farmer 🔨	1	0	1	0	0	3	0	X	5

Sheet E	1	2	3	4	5	6	7	8	Final
(Scotland) Rebecca Morrison	0	1	0	2	0	1	1	0	5
(Norway) Marianne Rørvik 🔨	0	0	1	0	1	0	0	2	4

==== Draw 7 ====
Thursday, 5 January, 4:30 pm

Sheet C	1	2	3	4	5	6	7	8	Final
(Scotland) Jodi Leigh Bass	0	1	0	1	0	0	X	X	2
(Scotland) Jackie Lockhart 🔨	3	0	2	0	2	1	X	X	8

Sheet H	1	2	3	4	5	6	7	8	Final
(Scotland) Amy Mitchell	0	0	0	1	0	X	X	X	1
(Italy) Stefania Constantini 🔨	1	1	3	0	2	X	X	X	7

==== Draw 9 ====
Friday, 6 January, 11:15 am

Sheet B	1	2	3	4	5	6	7	8	Final
(Scotland) Beth Farmer	1	0	2	0	2	0	0	2	7
(Italy) Stefania Constantini 🔨	0	2	0	1	0	2	1	0	6

Sheet C	1	2	3	4	5	6	7	8	Final
(Czech Republic) Alžběta Zelingrová	0	0	2	1	0	0	1	X	4
(Scotland) Rebecca Morrison 🔨	0	2	0	0	2	2	0	X	6

Sheet E	1	2	3	4	5	6	7	8	Final
(Norway) Marianne Rørvik	0	1	0	0	1	0	1	0	3
(Scotland) Jackie Lockhart 🔨	1	0	2	1	0	2	0	1	7

Sheet G	1	2	3	4	5	6	7	8	Final
(Scotland) Lucy Blair 🔨	2	0	1	0	0	0	X	X	3
(Germany) Daniela Jentsch	0	2	0	3	3	2	X	X	10

==== Draw 10 ====
Friday, 6 January, 2:45 pm

Sheet B	1	2	3	4	5	6	7	8	Final
(Scotland) Amy Mitchell 🔨	1	0	0	1	0	0	0	0	2
(Sweden) Moa Dryburgh	0	0	1	0	1	1	1	1	5

Sheet F	1	2	3	4	5	6	7	8	Final
(Scotland) Jodi Leigh Bass 🔨	0	1	0	0	X	X	X	X	1
(Scotland) Fay Henderson	3	0	3	4	X	X	X	X	10

==== Draw 11 ====
Friday, 6 January, 5:30 pm

Sheet D	1	2	3	4	5	6	7	8	Final
(Italy) Stefania Constantini 🔨	2	0	5	1	2	X	X	X	10
(Scotland) Lucy Blair	0	1	0	0	0	X	X	X	1

Sheet G	1	2	3	4	5	6	7	8	Final
(Scotland) Jackie Lockhart	1	0	1	1	0	3	0	X	6
(Czech Republic) Alžběta Zelingrová 🔨	0	3	0	0	3	0	4	X	10

==== Draw 12 ====
Friday, 6 January, 9:00 pm

Sheet B	1	2	3	4	5	6	7	8	Final
(Scotland) Jackie Lockhart	0	0	0	0	X	X	X	X	0
(Scotland) Rebecca Morrison 🔨	0	4	1	2	X	X	X	X	7

Sheet C	1	2	3	4	5	6	7	8	Final
(Italy) Stefania Constantini 🔨	0	0	0	1	1	0	2	0	4
(Germany) Daniela Jentsch	0	3	0	0	0	1	0	1	5

Sheet D	1	2	3	4	5	6	7	8	Final
(Czech Republic) Alžběta Zelingrová 🔨	2	0	1	2	1	2	X	X	8
(Scotland) Jodi Leigh Bass	0	1	0	0	0	0	X	X	1

Sheet E	1	2	3	4	5	6	7	8	Final
(Scotland) Lucy Blair 🔨	2	0	0	2	0	4	0	X	8
(Scotland) Amy Mitchell	0	1	1	0	2	0	1	X	5

Sheet F	1	2	3	4	5	6	7	8	Final
(Sweden) Moa Dryburgh 🔨	0	0	0	0	3	0	0	1	4
(Scotland) Beth Farmer	0	0	1	1	0	1	0	0	3

Sheet G	1	2	3	4	5	6	7	8	9	Final
(Scotland) Fay Henderson 🔨	0	1	1	0	0	0	1	1	0	4
(Norway) Marianne Rørvik	0	0	0	1	1	2	0	0	2	6

=== Playoffs ===
Quarterfinals
B2	(Italy) Stefania Constantini	4
A3	(Norway) Marianne Rørvik	7
A2	(Scotland) Jackie Lockhart	7
B3	(Sweden) Moa Dryburgh	8

Semifinals
A1	(Scotland) Rebecca Morrison	4
A3	(Norway) Marianne Rørvik	6
B1	(Germany) Daniela Jentsch	5
B3	(Sweden) Moa Dryburgh	4

Final
A3	(Norway) Marianne Rørvik	1
B1	(Germany) Daniela Jentsch	5

==== Quarterfinals ====
Saturday, 7 January, 8:00 am

Team	1	2	3	4	5	6	7	8	Final
(Italy) Stefania Constantini 🔨	1	0	1	0	0	2	0	X	4
(Norway) Marianne Rørvik	0	0	0	3	1	0	3	X	7

Team	1	2	3	4	5	6	7	8	9	Final
(Scotland) Jackie Lockhart 🔨	1	0	2	0	1	0	3	0	0	7
(Sweden) Moa Dryburgh	0	2	0	2	0	1	0	2	1	8

==== Semifinals ====
Saturday, 7 January, 11:00 am

Team	1	2	3	4	5	6	7	8	Final
(Scotland) Rebecca Morrison 🔨	0	0	2	0	0	1	1	X	4
(Norway) Marianne Rørvik	0	2	0	1	3	0	0	X	6

Team	1	2	3	4	5	6	7	8	Final
(Germany) Daniela Jentsch 🔨	1	0	0	2	0	1	0	1	5
(Sweden) Moa Dryburgh	0	1	0	0	1	0	2	0	4

==== Final ====
Saturday, 7 January, 2:00 pm

Team	1	2	3	4	5	6	7	8	Final
(Norway) Marianne Rørvik	0	0	0	0	1	0	0	0	1
(Germany) Daniela Jentsch 🔨	0	0	1	1	0	2	0	1	5
