= Grant Hardie =

Scottish curler (born 1992)

- Curler
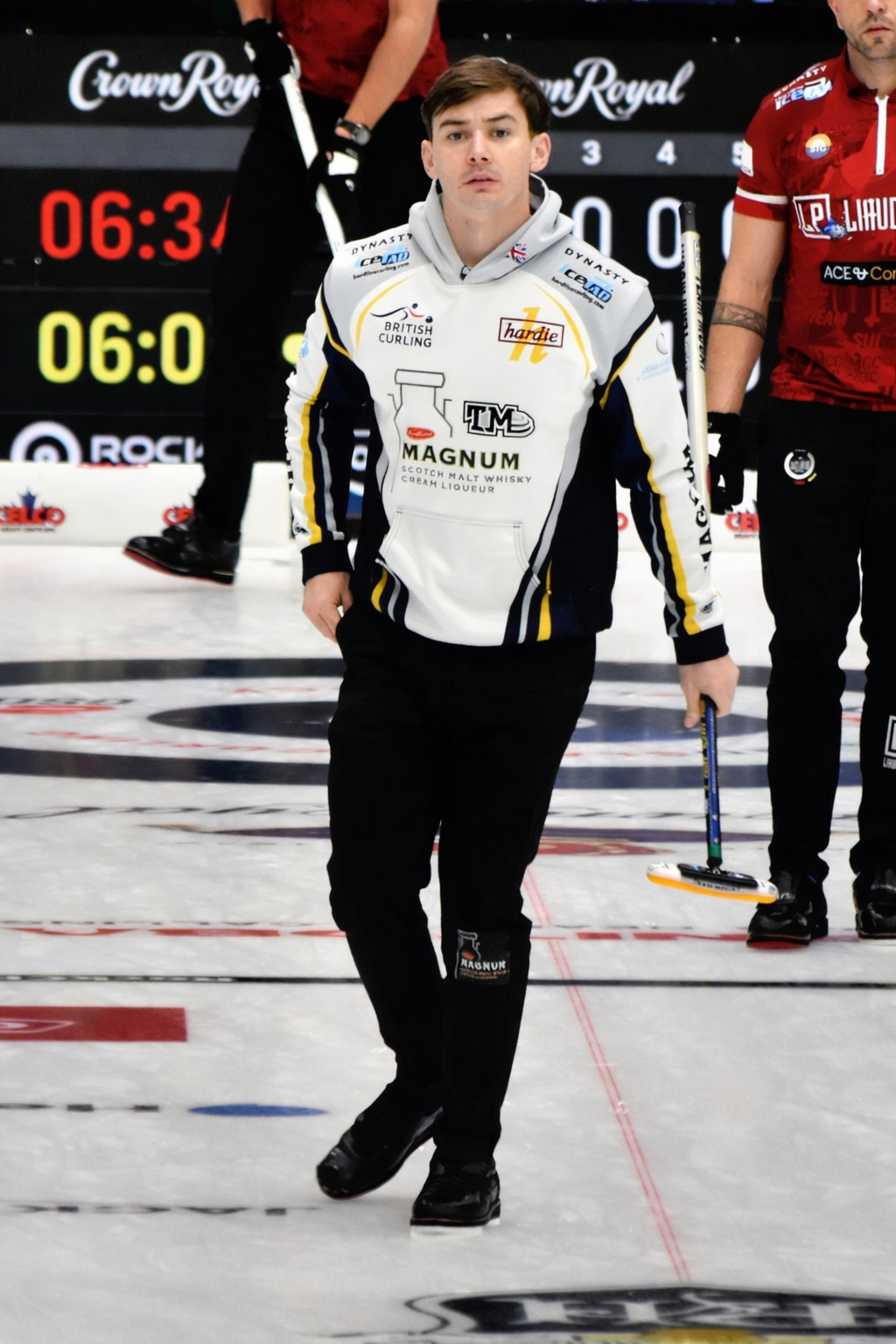
- Hardie at the 2026 Players' Championship.
- Born: 27 March 1992 (age 34); Dumfries, Scotland

Team
- Curling club: Crocketford CC, Dumfries, SCO
- Skip: Grant Hardie
- Fourth: Ross Whyte
- Second: Craig Waddell
- Lead: Euan Kyle

Curling career
- Member Association: Scotland; Great Britain
- World Championship: 6 (2018, 2019, 2021, 2023, 2024, 2025)
- World Mixed Championship: 1 (2017)
- European Championship: 7 (2018, 2021, 2022, 2023, 2024, 2025, 2026)
- Olympic: 2 (2022, 2026)
- Grand Slam victories: 12 (2017 National, 2021 Champions Cup, 2021 Players', 2021 Masters, 2022 Players', 2024 Canadian Open (Jan.), 2024 Tour Challenge, 2024 Canadian Open (Nov.), 2024 National, 2025 Players', 2025 Tour Challenge, 2025 GSOC Tahoe)
Medal record
Men's curling
Representing Great Britain
Olympic Games
Silver medal – second place	2022 Beijing	Team
Silver medal – second place	2026 Milano Cortina	Team
Winter Universiade
Bronze medal – third place	2015 Granada
Representing Scotland
World Championships
Gold medal – first place	2023 Ottawa
Gold medal – first place	2025 Moose Jaw
Silver medal – second place	2021 Calgary
Bronze medal – third place	2018 Las Vegas
European Championships
Gold medal – first place	2018 Tallinn
Gold medal – first place	2021 Lillehammer
Gold medal – first place	2022 Östersund
Gold medal – first place	2023 Aberdeen
Gold medal – first place	2026 Ostrava
Silver medal – second place	2024 Lohja
Bronze medal – third place	2025 Lohja
World Mixed Championships
Gold medal – first place	2017 Champéry
Scottish Men's Championship
Gold medal – first place	2018 Perth
Gold medal – first place	2019 Perth
Gold medal – first place	2020 Perth
Gold medal – first place	2023 Dumfries
Silver medal – second place	2025 Dumfries
Bronze medal – third place	2024 Dumfries
Scottish Mixed Doubles Championship
Silver medal – second place	2015 Glasgow
Bronze medal – third place	2014 Glasgow
Bronze medal – third place	2023 Perth
Bronze medal – third place	2024 Perth

Grant Hardie (born 27 March 1992 in Dumfries) is a Scottish curler from Glasgow. He currently skips his own team. He was the longtime third on Team Bruce Mouat. With Mouat, Hardie has won gold at the world men's championship in 2023 and 2025 and has captured four European championship titles (2018, 2021, 2022 and 2023) and twelve Grand Slam titles. He also earned two silver medals in the men's team event of the Winter Olympics (2022, 2026). He is a former World Mixed champion (2017).

== Career ==
=== 2012–2017 ===
In juniors, Hardie lost back-to-back finals at the Scottish Junior Curling Championships, both to the Kyle Smith rink. Despite this, his junior team of Jay McWilliam, Hammy McMillan Jr. and Billy Morton found success on the men's tour during the 2012–13 season. The team had two semifinals finishes at the 2012 Radisson Blu Oslo Cup and the 2012 Edinburgh International and a quarterfinal finish at the 2013 Mercure Perth Masters. The following season, the Dumfries rink continued their success with two more semifinal appearances at the Curling Masters Champéry and the Edinburgh International. After the team missed the playoffs at the 2014 Scottish Men's Curling Championship, Hardie left the team to join the Kyle Smith rink at third for the 2014–15 season. In his lone season with the team, they reached three tour finals at the Dumfries Curling Challenge, the Mercure Perth Masters and the Euronics European Masters, never managing to break through with their first tour win. The team also qualified to represent Great Britain at the 2015 Winter Universiade where Hardie, Smith, Thomas Muirhead, Alasdair Schreiber and Stuart Taylor would finish with a 6–3 round robin record. This earned them a spot in the playoffs, where they lost to Russia's Evgeny Arkhipov in the semifinal. They were, however, able to secure the bronze medal with a 7–4 victory over Sweden's Patric Mabergs.

After just one season with Team Smith, Hardie went back to skipping his own. In back-to-back seasons, his rink lost in a tiebreaker at the Scottish Men's Championship to the world junior championship Bruce Mouat rink. In 2017, Hardie won his first tour title at the Aberdeen International Curling Championship. This victory included wins over higher ranked team's such as Mike McEwen, John Shuster and Tom Brewster. It also qualified Team Hardie for the season-ending Champions Cup Grand Slam of Curling event, Hardie's first Slam appearance. There, the team went a winless 0–4. After the season, Hardie joined forces with Bruce Mouat to form a new team with second Bobby Lammie and lead Hammy McMillan Jr.

=== 2017–2022 ===
Team Mouat found immediate success to begin the 2017–18 season, going undefeated to claim the Stu Sells Oakville Tankard and the Oakville Fall Classic in back-to-back weeks. In both finals, the team beat the Kim Chang-min Korean rink. Later in the season, the Mouat rink would again beat Kim in another final, this time at the 2017 Boost National, the first Grand Slam event of the season. By winning the event, Team Mouat captured their first career Grand Slam title and became the second-ever non-Canadian team to win a men's Grand Slam event. The team followed this win with their fourth tour win of the season at the Dumfries Challenger Series back home in Scotland. In the new year, the team ran the table to win the 2018 Scottish Men's Curling Championship, defeating the Greg Drummond rink in the final. They then faced the Kyle Smith Olympic team in a best-of-three playoff to determine who would represent Scotland at the 2018 World Men's Curling Championship. Team Mouat won the series two games to one, earning the right to represent the country at their first men's worlds. In preparation for the world championship, the team won another tour event at the Aberdeen International Curling Championship, defeating Yannick Schwaller in the final. At the world championship in Las Vegas, Nevada, the team lost just one game in the round robin to Sweden's Niklas Edin. Their 11–1 record earned them a direct bye to the semifinals where they suffered a 9–5 defeat to Canada's Brad Gushue. Despite this, they ended the week on a positive note with a dominant victory over Korea's Kim in the bronze medal game. The team ended the season at the 2018 Players' Championship and 2018 Humpty's Champions Cup Slam events where they reached the quarterfinals and semifinals respectively.

Team Mouat's first major bonspiel of the 2018–19 season came in September at the first leg of the Curling World Cup, where the team had a third-place finish. Two weeks later, they played in the 2018 Elite 10 Grand Slam event, where they won just one game. A month later, the team was more successful at the 2018 Masters Grand Slam, making it to the semifinals. A month later, they made their debut at the 2018 European Curling Championships. After finishing the round robin with a 7–2 record, the rink beat Italy's Joël Retornaz and Sweden's Niklas Edin in the semifinal and final to claim the gold medal. Team Mouat wrapped up the calendar year with another third-place finish at the second leg of the Curling World Cup and a second-place finish at the 2018 National. The National featured the first all-Scotland Grand Slam final as the Mouat rink faced Team Ross Paterson. The team began 2019 by winning the Mercure Perth Masters, followed by a quarterfinal finish at the 2019 Canadian Open. The team then returned to Scotland to defend their Scottish championship, which they won, sending them to the 2019 World Men's Curling Championship in Lethbridge, Alberta. There, the team had a slow 1–3 start, but they managed to turn things around to qualify with an 8–4 record. They then lost to Canada's Kevin Koe in the first playoff round. To wrap the season up, Team Mouat lost in a tiebreaker at the 2019 Players' Championship and made it to the semifinals at the 2019 Champions Cup.

The Mouat rink did not have a good start to the 2019–20 season as they failed to qualify as the Scottish representatives for the 2019 European Curling Championships. They found better luck in Grand Slam play, however, making it to the semifinals of the 2019 Masters and the 2019 National and the quarterfinals of the 2020 Canadian Open. The team won just one event on tour, defending their championship at the Mercure Perth Masters. In February, Team Mouat won the Scottish Men's Championship for a third year in a row. The team was set to represent Scotland at the 2020 World Men's Curling Championship on home soil in Glasgow before the event got cancelled due to the COVID-19 pandemic. The Scottish championship would be their last event of the season as both the Players' Championship and the Champions Cup Grand Slam events were also cancelled due to the pandemic.

For much of the 2020–21 season, there was no tour due to the pandemic, but Team Mouat won a series of domestic challenges put on by the British Curling Association. A "curling bubble" was set up in Calgary, Canada, in the Spring, which hosted several events, including the 2021 World Men's Curling Championship and two slams. The Mouat rink represented Scotland at the 2021 Worlds, finishing with a 9–4 round robin record. In the playoffs, they beat Canada, and RCF (Russia), making it to the final, where they lost to Sweden, skipped by Niklas Edin. A week later, Team Mouat played in the 2021 Champions Cup in the same bubble, winning the event, defeating Team Brendan Bottcher (who had been Team Canada at the Worlds) to claim their second career Slam title. The team continued their impressive run in the bubble during the next event, the 2021 Players' Championship. They would go through pool play as the only undefeated team on both the men's and women's sides with a 5–0 record, earning the team a bye to the semifinals. They continued their undefeated streak in the playoffs, winning the semis and the finals against Brad Gushue to win their second straight Slam title in just six days.

In October 2021, Hardie and his teammates were named to the 2022 British Olympic team. They had another stellar season in 2021–22, starting the year by winning the 2021 Stu Sells Oakville Tankard and then following it up with the 2021 Masters, their fourth Slam title. The team then made another final at the 2021 National which they lost to the Gushue rink. Next for the team was the 2021 European Curling Championships where the team had another dominant performance, winning all eleven of their games en route to another gold medal. At the Olympics, the Mouat rink finished in first place through the round robin with a strong 8–1 record. In the playoffs, they beat the defending champion John Shuster rink from the United States before losing the gold medal to Sweden, skipped by Niklas Edin. Team Mouat continued their success after the Olympics, winning their second slam of the season at the 2022 Players' Championship. The team was awarded the Pinty's Cup as the season's best Grand Slam team after their win. In their final event, Team Mouat faltered for the first time all season, failing to qualify for the playoffs at the 2022 Champions Cup.

=== 2022–present ===
The Scottish team had a slow start to the 2022–23 season, failing to qualify at the 2022 Baden Masters and the 2022 National. They turned things around at the 2022 Tour Challenge with a quarterfinal finish and later a semifinal appearance at the Swiss Cup Basel. At the 2022 European Curling Championships, the team succeeded in defending their title. After losing just one game to Switzerland's Yannick Schwaller in the round robin, Team Mouat got their revenge by defeating the Swiss 5–4 in the gold medal game. The next month, they made it to the final of the 2022 Masters where they lost to Joël Retornaz. In their next event, however, they defeated the Italians in the final of the 2023 Mercure Perth Masters. After a quarterfinal appearance at the 2023 Canadian Open, Team Mouat went undefeated to claim their fourth Scottish men's championship, defeating the James Craik junior rink in the final. At the 2023 World Men's Curling Championship, the team had a 10–2 round robin record, enough for a semifinal bye. After defeating Retornaz in an extra end, the team shot a 96 percent game in the final to down Canada's Gushue 9–3 and claim the gold medal. It was Scotland's first world men's title since David Murdoch won the event in 2009. After their world championship success, the team flamed out at both the 2023 Players' Championship and the 2023 Champions Cup, failing to qualify at both events.

After their dismal finish to the previous season, Team Mouat turned things around with a hot start to the 2023–24 season, winning the 2023 Euro Super Series and the 2023 Stu Sells Oakville Tankard. In both finals, the team beat Scottish rivals Team Ross Whyte. They faltered slightly by missing the playoffs at the 2023 Tour Challenge but got back on track with a quarterfinal finish at the 2023 National. Next for the team was the 2023 European Curling Championships where they finished second through the round robin with a 7–2 record. They then beat Switzerland's Schwaller in the semifinals before defeating Sweden's Edin 6–5 in an extra end for their fourth European title. In January, they defended their title at the 2024 Mercure Perth Masters by once again defeating the Whyte rink. After having limited success at the previous three Slams, Team Mouat claimed their sixth title with an undefeated run at the 2024 Canadian Open, defeating the Brendan Bottcher rink in the final. At the Scottish championship, the team could not defend their title as they lost out in the semifinal to Team Craik. Despite this, they were still chosen to represent Scotland at the 2024 World Men's Curling Championship over the Ross Whyte rink who had won the Scottish championship. Before Worlds, they claimed another tour title at the Aberdeen International Curling Championship. The team had a strong start to the world championship, finishing third overall with a 10–2 record. After defeating the United States in the first round, they lost both the semifinal and bronze medal game to Canada and Italy, failing to defend their title and finishing fourth. They ended the season with a semifinal finish at the 2024 Players' Championship.

Team Mouat started the 2024–25 season strong, winning the 2024 Tour Challenge over Gushue 10–3. The win gave the Mouat rink their first Tour Challenge win, and with it, Team Mouat had won a championship in each of the tour's five slams in their career. The Mouat rink continued their winning streak at the 2024 Canadian Open, again beating Gushue in the final 6–3, and going undefeated to win the title. Team Mouat would again represent Scotland at the 2024 European Curling Championships, where the team would go 8–1 in the round robin, but lose to Germany's Marc Muskatewitz 9–7 in the final. The Mouat rink would rebound quickly, winning their third straight 2024-25 Grand Slam title, this time defeating Brad Jacobs Alberta-based rink in the 2024 National final, 5–3. It was a career 9th Slam win for Team Mouat, who finished the event with a 6–1 record. Team Mouat would however lose their second-straight Scottish National Championship, losing to Ross Whyte in the final 8–3. However, as the current #1 ranked team in the world, Mouat was again selected by Scottish Curling to represent Scotland at the 2025 World Men's Curling Championship. At the 2025 Worlds, the Mouat rink made the most of their selection, winning their second World Championship title, beating Switzerland's Schwaller 5-4 in the final.

=== Mixed doubles ===
Hardie found his first success in mixed doubles at the 2014 Scottish Mixed Doubles Curling Championship with partner Rowena Kerr. There, the pair reached the semifinals where they lost to Lauren and Logan Gray, earning the bronze medal. The following year, Hardie returned to the championship with Abigail Brown. This partnership reached the final where they lost to Gina Aitken and Bruce Mouat. Hardie did not play in another mixed doubles championship until 2020 where he and Vicky Wright failed to qualify.

After him and Wright failed to qualify again in 2022, Hardie joined forces with five-time national mixed doubles champion Gina Aitken for the 2023 championship. This pairing went undefeated through the event until the semifinals where they lost to eventual champions Jennifer Dodds and Hardie's teammate Mouat. In 2024, Aitken and Hardie again had a promising start, finishing 5–1 through the round robin. This earned them a bye to the semifinals where they were once again taken out by the eventual winners, Sophie Jackson and Duncan McFadzean.

=== Mixed ===
In 2017, Hardie and his team of Rhiann Macleod, Billy Morton and Barbara McFarlane won the Scottish Mixed Curling Championship. This qualified the team for the 2017 World Mixed Curling Championship where Hardie skipped the team to a 6–1 record in the round robin. They then beat Spain, Sweden and Czech Republic to qualify for the final against Canada's Trevor Bonot. Tied 5–5 in an extra end, Hardie made a double takeout to count three and secure the world title.

== Personal life ==
Hardie attended the University of Strathclyde where he studied civil engineering. He is the nephew of 1999 world champion Hammy McMillan. His cousin Hammy McMillan Jr. plays lead on his team while his other cousin Robyn Munro is a former World Junior champion.

== Grand Slam record ==
Key
C	Champion
F	Lost in Final
SF	Lost in Semifinal
QF	Lost in Quarterfinals
R16	Lost in the round of 16
Q	Did not advance to playoffs
T2	Played in Tier 2 event
DNP	Did not participate in event
N/A	Not a Grand Slam event that season

Event	2016–17	2017–18	2018–19	2019–20	2020–21	2021–22	2022–23	2023–24	2024–25	2025–26	2026–27
Invitational	DNP	DNP	DNP	Q	N/A	N/A	QF	Q	C	C	QF
Masters	DNP	DNP	SF	SF	N/A	C	F	DNP	SF	SF	QF
National	DNP	C	F	SF	N/A	F	Q	QF	C	C	QF
Open	DNP	Q	QF	QF	N/A	N/A	QF	C	C	SF	
Players'	DNP	QF	Q	N/A	C	C	Q	SF	C	Q	
Champions Cup	Q	SF	SF	N/A	C	Q	Q	N/A	N/A	N/A	N/A
Elite 10	DNP	DNP	Q	N/A	N/A	N/A	N/A	N/A	N/A	N/A	N/A

== Teams ==
Season	Skip	Third	Second	Lead	Alternate
2010–11	Jay McWilliam	Grant Hardie	Struan Wood	Ian Copland	
2011–12	Jay McWilliam	Colin Dick	Grant Hardie	Billy Morton	
2012–13	Grant Hardie	Jay McWilliam	Hammy McMillan Jr.	Billy Morton	
2013–14	Grant Hardie	Jay McWilliam	Hammy McMillan Jr.	Billy Morton	
2014–15	Kyle Smith	Grant Hardie	Kyle Waddell	Cammy Smith	
2014–15	Kyle Smith	Grant Hardie	Thomas Muirhead	Alasdair Schreiber	Stuart Taylor
2015–16	Grant Hardie	Blair Fraser	David Reid	Billy Morton	
2016–17	Grant Hardie	Blair Fraser	David Reid	Duncan Menzies	
2017–18	Bruce Mouat	Grant Hardie	Bobby Lammie	Hammy McMillan Jr.	Ross Paterson (WMCC)
2018–19	Bruce Mouat	Grant Hardie	Bobby Lammie	Hammy McMillan Jr.	Ross Whyte
2019–20	Bruce Mouat	Grant Hardie	Bobby Lammie	Hammy McMillan Jr.	Ross Whyte
2020–21	Bruce Mouat	Grant Hardie	Bobby Lammie	Hammy McMillan Jr.	Ross Whyte
2021–22	Bruce Mouat	Grant Hardie	Bobby Lammie	Hammy McMillan Jr.	Ross Whyte
2022–23	Bruce Mouat	Grant Hardie	Bobby Lammie	Hammy McMillan Jr.	Kyle Waddell
2023–24	Bruce Mouat	Grant Hardie	Bobby Lammie	Hammy McMillan Jr.	Kyle Waddell
2024–25	Bruce Mouat	Grant Hardie	Bobby Lammie	Hammy McMillan Jr.	Kyle Waddell
2025–26	Bruce Mouat	Grant Hardie	Bobby Lammie	Hammy McMillan Jr.	Kyle Waddell
2026–27	Ross Whyte (Fourth)	Grant Hardie (Skip)	Craig Waddell	Euan Kyle	
