= 2024 Karuizawa International Curling Championships =

- Host city: Karuizawa, Japan
- Arena: Karuizawa Ice Park
- Dates: December 13–15
- Men's winner: (Germany) Team Muskatewitz
- Curling club: CC Füssen, Füssen
- Skip: Marc Muskatewitz
- Third: Benjamin Kapp
- Second: Felix Messenzehl
- Lead: Johannes Scheuerl
- Alternate: Mario Trevisiol
- Coach: Ryan Sherrard
- Finalist: (Japan) Team Yanagisawa
- Women's winner: (Japan) Team Yoshimura
- Curling club: Sapporo CC, Sapporo
- Skip: Sayaka Yoshimura
- Third: Kaho Onodera
- Second: Yuna Kotani
- Lead: Anna Ohmiya
- Alternate: Mina Kobayashi
- Coach: Yumie Funayama
- Finalist: (Sweden) Anna Hasselborg

The 2024 Karuizawa International Curling Championships were held from December 13 to 15 at the Karuizawa Ice Park in Karuizawa, Nagano, Japan. The total purse for the event was ¥ 1,500,000 on both the men's and women's sides.

In the men's final, Germany's Marc Muskatewitz capped off an undefeated run by downing Tsuyoshi Yamaguchi, skipping Team Riku Yanagisawa, 10–4 in the championship game. It was a second title for the German rink of Muskatewitz, Benjamin Kapp, Felix Messenzehl, Johannes Scheuerl and Mario Trevisiol who also won the 2024 European Curling Championships the month prior. After opening with a count of two, the Germans got four in the fifth end and three in the seventh end while Yanagisawa could only count two singles and a pair across the seven ends played. Muskatewitz became the fourth men's skip from Europe to win the event following Markku Uusipaavalniemi (2001), David Murdoch (2015) and Tom Brewster (2016). Switzerland's Michael Brunner took third place with a 7–3 win over Sapporo's Shinya Abe. Both Italy's Joël Retornaz and Sweden's Niklas Edin, two of the three highest ranked teams entering the event, missed the playoffs in a shocking result.

In the women's final, Sapporo's Sayaka Yoshimura scored three in the eighth end to defeat Sweden's Anna Hasselborg 5–4. Facing one on her last rock, Hasselborg tried to pick the lone Yoshimura stone out of the rings but rubbed her own rock in the top twelve, doubling out her own counters instead. It was a second title at the event for Yoshimura who also won in 2015 as part of the Ayumi Ogasawara rink. The previous two years, her team of Kaho Onodera, Yuna Kotani, Anna Ohmiya and Mina Kobayashi reached the playoffs but lost in the semifinal to Kim Eun-jung. It was the team's second tour win of the year after winning the ADVICS Cup in August. In the third-place game, Switzerland's Silvana Tirinzoni avenged her round robin loss against Miyu Ueno by defeating the Japanese team 5–3. Canada's Selena Sturmay and defending champion Ikue Kitazawa both missed the playoffs.

== Men ==
=== Teams ===
The teams are listed as follows:

Skip	Third	Second	Lead	Alternate	Locale
Tetsuro Shimizu (Fourth)	Shinya Abe (Skip)	Hayato Sato	Haruto Ouchi	Sota Tsuruga	Sapporo, Japan
Michael Brunner	Anthony Petoud	Romano Meier	Andreas Gerlach		Bern, Switzerland
Niklas Edin	Oskar Eriksson	Rasmus Wranå	Christoffer Sundgren		Karlstad, Sweden
Takumi Maeda	Asei Nakahara	Hiroki Maeda	Uryu Kamikawa	Ryoji Onodera	Kitami, Japan
Yusuke Morozumi	Yuta Matsumura	Ryotaro Shukuya	Masaki Iwai	Kosuke Morozumi	Karuizawa, Japan
Marc Muskatewitz	Benjamin Kapp	Felix Messenzehl	Johannes Scheuerl	Mario Trevisiol	Füssen, Germany
Joël Retornaz	Amos Mosaner	Sebastiano Arman	Mattia Giovanella		Trentino, Italy
Riku Yanagisawa (Fourth)	Tsuyoshi Yamaguchi (Skip)	Takeru Yamamoto	Satoshi Koizumi		Karuizawa, Japan

=== Round robin standings ===
Final Round Robin Standings

Key
Teams to Playoffs

Pool A	W	L	W–L	PF	PA
(Japan) Shinya Abe	2	1	1–0	17	15
(Switzerland) Michael Brunner	2	1	0–1	16	12
(Japan) Yusuke Morozumi	1	2	1–0	14	16
(Italy) Joël Retornaz	1	2	0–1	11	15

Pool B	W	L	W–L	PF	PA
(Germany) Marc Muskatewitz	3	0	–	24	9
(Japan) Team Yanagisawa	2	1	–	17	18
(Sweden) Niklas Edin	1	2	–	15	20
(Japan) Takumi Maeda	0	3	–	10	19

=== Round robin results ===
All draw times are listed in Japan Standard Time (UTC+09:00).

==== Draw 1 ====
Friday, December 13, 2:00 pm

Sheet A	1	2	3	4	5	6	7	8	Final
(Japan) Team Yanagisawa	0	1	0	0	3	0	2	1	7
(Japan) Takumi Maeda 🔨	1	0	1	1	0	1	0	0	4

Sheet E	1	2	3	4	5	6	7	8	Final
(Switzerland) Michael Brunner 🔨	0	2	2	0	2	0	X	X	6
(Japan) Yusuke Morozumi	0	0	0	1	0	1	X	X	2

Sheet F	1	2	3	4	5	6	7	8	Final
(Japan) Shinya Abe	0	0	0	2	0	0	1	0	3
(Italy) Joël Retornaz 🔨	1	0	0	0	2	0	0	2	5

==== Draw 2 ====
Friday, December 13, 6:00 pm

Sheet B	1	2	3	4	5	6	7	8	Final
(Germany) Marc Muskatewitz	0	2	0	1	0	4	3	X	10
(Japan) Team Yanagisawa 🔨	2	0	1	0	1	0	0	X	4

Sheet C	1	2	3	4	5	6	7	8	Final
(Japan) Takumi Maeda	1	1	0	0	0	2	0	X	4
(Sweden) Niklas Edin 🔨	0	0	2	1	4	0	1	X	8

==== Draw 3 ====
Saturday, December 14, 9:00 am

Sheet C	1	2	3	4	5	6	7	8	Final
(Italy) Joël Retornaz	0	0	0	0	1	0	0	X	1
(Japan) Yusuke Morozumi 🔨	1	1	1	1	0	0	2	X	6

Sheet E	1	2	3	4	5	6	7	8	Final
(Switzerland) Michael Brunner 🔨	0	2	0	0	0	2	0	0	4
(Japan) Shinya Abe	2	0	1	0	0	0	0	2	5

==== Draw 4 ====
Saturday, December 14, 1:00 pm

Sheet A	1	2	3	4	5	6	7	8	Final
(Japan) Yusuke Morozumi 🔨	2	0	1	0	0	3	0	X	6
(Japan) Shinya Abe	0	2	0	2	2	0	3	X	9

Sheet B	1	2	3	4	5	6	7	8	Final
(Italy) Joël Retornaz	0	2	0	1	0	0	2	0	5
(Switzerland) Michael Brunner 🔨	1	0	2	0	1	1	0	1	6

Sheet C	1	2	3	4	5	6	7	8	9	Final
(Sweden) Niklas Edin 🔨	2	0	1	0	1	0	0	0	0	4
(Japan) Team Yanagisawa	0	1	0	0	0	1	1	1	2	6

Sheet F	1	2	3	4	5	6	7	8	Final
(Germany) Marc Muskatewitz	0	1	0	1	0	1	0	1	4
(Japan) Takumi Maeda 🔨	2	0	0	0	0	0	0	0	2

==== Draw 5 ====
Saturday, December 14, 5:00 pm

Sheet B	1	2	3	4	5	6	7	8	Final
(Sweden) Niklas Edin	0	1	0	2	0	0	X	X	3
(Germany) Marc Muskatewitz 🔨	1	0	2	0	1	6	X	X	10

=== Playoffs ===
Semifinals
A1	(Japan) Shinya Abe	4
B2	(Japan) Team Yanagisawa	6
B1	(Germany) Marc Muskatewitz	8
A2	(Switzerland) Michael Brunner	6

Final
B2	(Japan) Team Yanagisawa	4
B1	(Germany) Marc Muskatewitz	10
Bronze medal game
A1	(Japan) Shinya Abe	3
A2	(Switzerland) Michael Brunner	7

==== Semifinals ====
Sunday, December 15, 9:00 am

Sheet E	1	2	3	4	5	6	7	8	Final
(Japan) Shinya Abe 🔨	2	0	0	1	0	0	0	1	4
(Japan) Team Yanagisawa	0	2	0	0	0	3	1	0	6

Sheet F	1	2	3	4	5	6	7	8	Final
(Germany) Marc Muskatewitz 🔨	2	0	2	1	0	1	0	2	8
(Switzerland) Michael Brunner	0	1	0	0	3	0	2	0	6

==== Third place game ====
Sunday, December 15, 2:00 pm

Sheet B	1	2	3	4	5	6	7	8	Final
(Japan) Shinya Abe 🔨	0	2	0	0	0	1	0	X	3
(Switzerland) Michael Brunner	0	0	0	1	2	0	4	X	7

==== Final ====
Sunday, December 15, 2:00 pm

Sheet C	1	2	3	4	5	6	7	8	Final
(Japan) Team Yanagisawa	0	1	0	1	0	2	0	X	4
(Germany) Marc Muskatewitz 🔨	2	0	1	0	4	0	3	X	10

== Women ==
=== Teams ===
The teams are listed as follows:

Skip	Third	Second	Lead	Alternate	Locale
Anna Hasselborg	Sofia Mabergs	Agnes Knochenhauer	Johanna Heldin (Note: Johanna Heldin spared for Sara McManus. She played lead while lead Sofia Mabergs moved up to third.)		Sundbyberg, Sweden
Ikue Kitazawa	Seina Nakajima	Ami Enami	Minori Suzuki	Hasumi Ishigooka	Nagano, Japan
Park You-been	Lee Eun-chae	Kim Ji-yoon	Yang Seung-hee		Seoul, South Korea
Selena Sturmay	Danielle Schmiemann	Dezaray Hawes	Paige Papley		Edmonton, Alberta, Canada
Momoha Tabata (Fourth)	Miku Nihira (Skip)	Sae Yamamoto	Mikoto Nakajima	Ayami Ito	Sapporo, Japan
Alina Pätz (Fourth)	Silvana Tirinzoni (Skip)	Carole Howald	Selina Witschonke		Aarau, Switzerland
Miyu Ueno	Yui Ueno	Junko Nishimuro	Asuka Kanai		Karuizawa, Japan
Sayaka Yoshimura	Kaho Onodera (Note: Kaho Onodera and Yuna Kotani switched positions for the event.)	Yuna Kotani	Anna Ohmiya	Mina Kobayashi	Sapporo, Japan

=== Round robin standings ===
Final Round Robin Standings

Key
Teams to Playoffs

Pool A	W	L	W–L	PF	PA
(Japan) Miyu Ueno	2	1	1–0	15	16
(Switzerland) Silvana Tirinzoni	2	1	0–1	15	13
(Japan) Team Tabata	1	2	1–0	12	11
(Japan) Ikue Kitazawa	1	2	0–1	12	14

Pool B	W	L	W–L	PF	PA
(Japan) Sayaka Yoshimura	2	1	1–0	19	10
(Sweden) Anna Hasselborg	2	1	0–1	21	9
(Canada) Selena Sturmay	1	2	1–0	7	20
(South Korea) Park You-been	1	2	0–1	12	20

=== Round robin results ===
All draw times are listed in Japan Standard Time (UTC+09:00).

==== Draw 1 ====
Friday, December 13, 2:00 pm

Sheet B	1	2	3	4	5	6	7	8	Final
(Switzerland) Silvana Tirinzoni 🔨	0	0	1	0	2	0	1	2	6
(Japan) Team Tabata	0	0	0	1	0	1	0	0	2

Sheet C	1	2	3	4	5	6	7	8	Final
(Sweden) Anna Hasselborg 🔨	0	0	1	0	0	2	0	0	3
(Japan) Sayaka Yoshimura	0	0	0	1	1	0	2	2	6

==== Draw 2 ====
Friday, December 13, 6:00 pm

Sheet A	1	2	3	4	5	6	7	8	Final
(Japan) Team Tabata 🔨	0	0	2	0	1	1	3	X	7
(Japan) Ikue Kitazawa	1	0	0	0	0	0	0	X	1

Sheet E	1	2	3	4	5	6	7	8	Final
(Japan) Miyu Ueno 🔨	1	0	3	0	1	0	4	X	9
(Switzerland) Silvana Tirinzoni	0	2	0	1	0	1	0	X	4

Sheet F	1	2	3	4	5	6	7	8	Final
(Canada) Selena Sturmay	1	0	2	0	0	1	0	1	5
(South Korea) Park You-been 🔨	0	2	0	0	1	0	1	0	4

==== Draw 3 ====
Saturday, December 14, 9:00 am

Sheet B	1	2	3	4	5	6	7	8	Final
(South Korea) Park You-been	0	2	0	0	0	0	X	X	2
(Sweden) Anna Hasselborg 🔨	2	0	1	2	4	1	X	X	10

Sheet F	1	2	3	4	5	6	7	8	Final
(Japan) Ikue Kitazawa	0	3	0	2	2	2	X	X	9
(Japan) Miyu Ueno 🔨	0	0	2	0	0	0	X	X	2

==== Draw 4 ====
Saturday, December 14, 1:00 pm

Sheet E	1	2	3	4	5	6	7	8	Final
(Japan) Sayaka Yoshimura 🔨	2	3	0	2	1	X	X	X	8
(Canada) Selena Sturmay	0	0	1	0	0	X	X	X	1

==== Draw 5 ====
Saturday, December 14, 5:00 pm

Sheet A	1	2	3	4	5	6	7	8	9	Final
(Japan) Sayaka Yoshimura	0	3	0	0	1	1	0	0	0	5
(South Korea) Park You-been 🔨	2	0	0	1	0	0	1	1	1	6

Sheet C	1	2	3	4	5	6	7	8	Final
(Switzerland) Silvana Tirinzoni 🔨	0	1	0	1	0	0	3	X	5
(Japan) Ikue Kitazawa	0	0	1	0	0	1	0	X	2

Sheet E	1	2	3	4	5	6	7	8	Final
(Japan) Team Tabata 🔨	0	0	0	1	0	1	1	X	3
(Japan) Miyu Ueno	0	2	1	0	1	0	0	X	4

Sheet F	1	2	3	4	5	6	7	8	Final
(Sweden) Anna Hasselborg 🔨	1	1	1	4	0	1	X	X	8
(Canada) Selena Sturmay	0	0	0	0	1	0	X	X	1

=== Playoffs ===
Semifinals
A1	(Japan) Miyu Ueno	4
B2	(Sweden) Anna Hasselborg	6
B1	(Japan) Sayaka Yoshimura	8
A2	(Switzerland) Silvana Tirinzoni	3

Final
B2	(Sweden) Anna Hasselborg	4
B1	(Japan) Sayaka Yoshimura	5
Bronze medal game
A1	(Japan) Miyu Ueno	3
A2	(Switzerland) Silvana Tirinzoni	5

==== Semifinals ====
Sunday, December 15, 9:00 am

Sheet B	1	2	3	4	5	6	7	8	Final
(Japan) Sayaka Yoshimura 🔨	2	0	0	2	0	4	X	X	8
(Switzerland) Silvana Tirinzoni	0	0	2	0	1	0	X	X	3

Sheet C	1	2	3	4	5	6	7	8	Final
(Japan) Miyu Ueno	0	0	1	0	1	0	2	0	4
(Sweden) Anna Hasselborg 🔨	0	3	0	0	0	2	0	1	6

==== Third place game ====
Sunday, December 15, 2:00 pm

Sheet F	1	2	3	4	5	6	7	8	Final
(Japan) Miyu Ueno	0	2	0	1	0	0	0	0	3
(Switzerland) Silvana Tirinzoni 🔨	0	0	3	0	1	0	0	1	5

==== Final ====
Sunday, December 15, 2:00 pm

Sheet E	1	2	3	4	5	6	7	8	Final
(Sweden) Anna Hasselborg	0	1	1	0	1	0	1	0	4
(Japan) Sayaka Yoshimura 🔨	1	0	0	0	0	1	0	3	5
