= Curling at the 2026 Winter Olympics – Men's tournament =

Men's curling at the XXV Olympic Winter Games
- Venue: Cortina Olympic Stadium
- Dates: 11–21 February
- Competitors: 50 from 10 nations

Medalists
1st place, gold medalist(s)		Brad Jacobs; Marc Kennedy; Brett Gallant; Ben Hebert; Tyler Tardi	Canada
2nd place, silver medalist(s)		Bruce Mouat; Grant Hardie; Bobby Lammie; Hammy McMillan Jr. Kyle Waddell	Great Britain
3rd place, bronze medalist(s)		Benoît Schwarz-van Berkel; Yannick Schwaller; Sven Michel; Pablo Lachat-Couchepin; Kim Schwaller	Switzerland

The men's curling tournament of the 2026 Winter Olympics was held at the Cortina Olympic Stadium in Cortina D’Ampezzo from 11 to 21 February 2026.

Ten nations competed in a round robin preliminary round, and the top four nations at the conclusion of the round robin qualified for the medal round.

Canada won the gold medal with Great Britain taking silver and Switzerland the bronze.

== Competition schedule ==
RR	Round robin	SF	Semifinals	B	3rd place play-off	F	Final

Date Event	Wed 11	Thu 12	Fri 13	Sat 14	Sun 15	Mon 16	Tue 17	Wed 18	Thu 19		Fri 20	Sat 21
Men's Tournament	RR	RR	RR	RR	RR	RR	RR	RR	RR	SF	B	F

== Qualification ==
The top seven nations based on combined rankings at the 2024 World Men's Curling Championship and 2025 World Men's Curling Championship qualified along with hosts Italy. The final two teams qualified through the 2025 Olympic Qualification Event.

Means of qualification	Dates	Location	Quotas	Qualified
Host nation	—N/a		1	Italy
Qualification points at the 2024 & 2025 World Championships	30 March–7 April 2024	Schaffhausen, Switzerland	7	Great Britain; Canada; Sweden; Switzerland; Germany; Norway; Czech Republic
Qualification points at the 2024 & 2025 World Championships	29 March–6 April 2025	Moose Jaw, Canada	7	Great Britain; Canada; Sweden; Switzerland; Germany; Norway; Czech Republic
Olympic Qualification Event	6–13 December 2025	Kelowna, Canada	2	United States; China
Total			10	

== Teams ==
The teams are listed as follows:

Canada	China	Czech Republic	Germany	Great Britain
The Glencoe Club, Calgary: Skip: Brad Jacobs; Third: Marc Kennedy; Second: Brett Gallant; Lead: Ben Hebert; Alternate: Tyler Tardi	CSO Curling Club, Beijing: Skip: Xu Xiaoming; Third: Fei Xueqing; Second: Li Zhichao; Lead: Xu Jingtao; Alternate: Wang Zhenhao	CC Zbraslav & CC Dion, Prague: Skip: Lukáš Klíma; Third: Marek Černovský; Second: Martin Jurík; Lead: Lukáš Klípa; Alternate: Radek Boháč	CC Füssen, Füssen: Skip: Marc Muskatewitz; Third: Benjamin Kapp; Second: Felix Messenzehl; Lead: Johannes Scheuerl; Alternate: Mario Trevisiol	Curl Edinburgh, Edinburgh: Skip: Bruce Mouat; Third: Grant Hardie; Second: Bobby Lammie; Lead: Hammy McMillan Jr.; Alternate: Kyle Waddell
Italy	Norway	Sweden	Switzerland	United States
Trentino Curling Cembra, Cembra: Skip: Joël Retornaz; Third: Amos Mosaner; Second: Sebastiano Arman; Lead: Mattia Giovanella; Alternate: Alberto Pimpini	Trondheim CK, Trondheim: Skip: Magnus Ramsfjell; Third: Martin Sesaker; Second: Bendik Ramsfjell; Lead: Gaute Nepstad; Alternate: Willhelm Næss	Karlstad CK, Karlstad: Skip: Niklas Edin; Third: Oskar Eriksson; Second: Rasmus Wranå; Lead: Christoffer Sundgren; Alternate: Simon Olofsson	CC Genève, Geneva: Fourth: Benoît Schwarz-van Berkel; Skip: Yannick Schwaller; Second: Sven Michel; Lead: Pablo Lachat-Couchepin; Alternate: Kim Schwaller	Chaska CC, Chaska: Skip: Daniel Casper; Third: Luc Violette; Second: Ben Richardson; Lead: Aidan Oldenburg; Alternate: Rich Ruohonen

== Round robin standings ==
Final Round Robin Standings
Team	Skip	Pld	W	L	W–L	PF	PA	EW	EL	BE	SE	S%	DSC	Qualification
Switzerland	Yannick Schwaller	9	9	0	–	75	40	42	30	3	8	88.7%	9.506	Playoffs
Canada	Brad Jacobs	9	7	2	–	63	45	40	28	8	13	86.5%	28.844	Playoffs
Norway	Magnus Ramsfjell	9	5	4	1–0	60	61	37	38	6	7	80.8%	26.938	Playoffs
Great Britain	Bruce Mouat	9	5	4	0–1	63	48	39	33	2	10	86.4%	16.613	Playoffs
United States	Daniel Casper	9	4	5	1–1	52	65	34	37	5	3	81.7%	17.663	
Italy	Joël Retornaz	9	4	5	1–1	58	67	33	39	6	7	83.0%	17.869	
Germany	Marc Muskatewitz	9	4	5	1–1	51	57	36	37	8	7	84.4%	24.850	
Czech Republic	Lukáš Klíma	9	3	6	–	54	63	35	41	3	5	79.8%	29.013	
Sweden	Niklas Edin	9	2	7	1–0	44	63	31	39	6	3	82.5%	26.000	
China	Xu Xiaoming	9	2	7	0–1	52	63	35	40	3	5	81.4%	34.875	

Source: Official website

Men's round robin summary table
Pos	Team	W	L	SUI	CAN	NOR	GBR	USA	ITA	GER	CZE	SWE	CHN
1	Switzerland	9	0	—	9–5	10–4	6–5	8–3	9–5	8–4	7–3	9–4	9–7
2	Canada	7	2	5–9	—	6–8	9–5	6–3	8–3	7–6	8–2	8–6	6–3
3	Norway	5	4	4–10	8–6	—	7–6	8–10	10–7	4–5	7–4	4–7	8–6
4	Great Britain	5	4	5–6	5–9	6–7	—	9–2	7–9	9–4	7–4	6–3	9–4
5	United States	4	5	3–8	3–6	10–8	2–9	—	5–8	8–6	8–7	8–5	5–8
6	Italy	4	5	5–9	3–8	7–10	9–7	8–5	—	5–6	10–5	7–6	4–11
7	Germany	4	5	4–8	6–7	5–4	4–9	6–8	6–5	—	7–9	7–3	6–4
8	Czech Republic	3	6	3–7	2–8	4–7	4–7	7–8	5–10	9–7	—	10–4	10–5
9	Sweden	2	7	4–9	6–8	7–4	3–6	5–8	6–7	3–7	4–10	—	6–4
10	China	2	7	7–9	3–6	6–8	4–9	8–5	11–4	4–6	5–10	4–6	—

Legend: Blue = home team win; Red = away team win.

== Round robin results ==
All draw times are listed in Central European Time (UTC+01:00).

=== Draw 1 ===
Wednesday, 11 February, 19:05

Sheet A	1	2	3	4	5	6	7	8	9	10	Final
Sweden (Edin) 🔨	0	0	0	1	0	2	0	2	0	1	6
Italy (Retornaz)	1	0	0	0	3	0	1	0	2	0	7

Sheet B	1	2	3	4	5	6	7	8	9	10	11	Final
Canada (Jacobs)	0	0	0	2	2	0	0	0	2	0	1	7
Germany (Muskatewitz) 🔨	0	0	2	0	0	2	0	0	0	2	0	6

Sheet C	1	2	3	4	5	6	7	8	9	10	Final
Czech Republic (Klíma)	0	0	1	0	3	0	1	0	2	0	7
United States (Casper) 🔨	0	1	0	1	0	2	0	3	0	1	8

Sheet D	1	2	3	4	5	6	7	8	9	10	Final
China (Xu)	0	1	0	1	0	1	0	1	0	X	4
Great Britain (Mouat) 🔨	1	0	3	0	1	0	3	0	1	X	9

=== Draw 2 ===
Thursday, 12 February, 14:05

Sheet A	1	2	3	4	5	6	7	8	9	10	Final
Norway (Ramsfjell)	0	1	0	0	1	0	0	1	0	1	4
Germany (Muskatewitz) 🔨	0	0	3	0	0	1	0	0	1	0	5

Sheet B	1	2	3	4	5	6	7	8	9	10	Final
United States (Casper)	0	1	0	0	1	0	0	1	X	X	3
Switzerland (Schwaller) 🔨	1	0	0	2	0	3	2	0	X	X	8

Sheet C	1	2	3	4	5	6	7	8	9	10	Final
Great Britain (Mouat) 🔨	2	0	0	1	1	0	2	0	X	X	6
Sweden (Edin)	0	0	1	0	0	1	0	1	X	X	3

=== Draw 3 ===
Friday, 13 February, 9:05

Sheet A	1	2	3	4	5	6	7	8	9	10	Final
Canada (Jacobs) 🔨	1	0	0	2	0	1	0	2	0	X	6
United States (Casper)	0	1	0	0	1	0	0	0	1	X	3

Sheet B	1	2	3	4	5	6	7	8	9	10	Final
Great Britain (Mouat) 🔨	0	1	0	2	1	0	0	2	1	0	7
Italy (Retornaz)	4	0	1	0	0	0	2	0	0	2	9

Sheet C	1	2	3	4	5	6	7	8	9	10	11	Final
China (Xu)	0	2	0	1	0	1	0	1	0	1	0	6
Norway (Ramsfjell) 🔨	0	0	2	0	2	0	1	0	1	0	2	8

Sheet D	1	2	3	4	5	6	7	8	9	10	Final
Switzerland (Schwaller) 🔨	2	0	0	2	1	0	2	0	X	X	7
Czech Republic (Klíma)	0	0	1	0	0	1	0	1	X	X	3

=== Draw 4 ===
Friday, 13 February, 19:05

Sheet A	1	2	3	4	5	6	7	8	9	10	Final
Switzerland (Schwaller)	0	2	0	3	0	1	0	1	1	1	9
China (Xu) 🔨	2	0	1	0	2	0	2	0	0	0	7

Sheet B	1	2	3	4	5	6	7	8	9	10	Final
Czech Republic (Klíma) 🔨	0	0	1	0	1	0	1	0	1	X	4
Norway (Ramsfjell)	1	0	0	2	0	2	0	2	0	X	7

Sheet C	1	2	3	4	5	6	7	8	9	10	11	Final
Germany (Muskatewitz) 🔨	0	0	0	1	0	1	0	3	0	0	1	6
Italy (Retornaz)	0	0	1	0	1	0	2	0	0	1	0	5

Sheet D	1	2	3	4	5	6	7	8	9	10	Final
Canada (Jacobs)	0	0	2	0	1	0	0	4	0	1	8
Sweden (Edin) 🔨	1	0	0	1	0	2	0	0	2	0	6

=== Draw 5 ===
Saturday, 14 February, 14:05

Sheet A	1	2	3	4	5	6	7	8	9	10	Final
Czech Republic (Klíma)	0	1	0	1	0	0	0	2	0	X	4
Great Britain (Mouat) 🔨	2	0	2	0	1	1	0	0	1	X	7

Sheet B	1	2	3	4	5	6	7	8	9	10	Final
Sweden (Edin) 🔨	2	0	0	1	0	0	1	0	2	0	6
China (Xu)	0	1	0	0	1	0	0	1	0	1	4

Sheet C	1	2	3	4	5	6	7	8	9	10	Final
Switzerland (Schwaller) 🔨	2	0	2	0	2	0	2	0	1	X	9
Canada (Jacobs)	0	2	0	1	0	1	0	1	0	X	5

Sheet D	1	2	3	4	5	6	7	8	9	10	Final
Germany (Muskatewitz)	0	1	1	0	1	1	0	2	0	X	6
United States (Casper) 🔨	4	0	0	2	0	0	1	0	1	X	8

=== Draw 6 ===
Sunday, 15 February, 9:05

Sheet A	1	2	3	4	5	6	7	8	9	10	Final
United States (Casper)	0	1	0	3	0	1	1	0	2	X	8
Sweden (Edin) 🔨	1	0	1	0	1	0	0	2	0	X	5

Sheet B	1	2	3	4	5	6	7	8	9	10	Final
Germany (Muskatewitz)	0	0	2	0	0	0	0	2	0	X	4
Great Britain (Mouat) 🔨	2	0	0	2	1	0	2	0	2	X	9

Sheet D	1	2	3	4	5	6	7	8	9	10	Final
Norway (Ramsfjell) 🔨	0	1	0	3	0	1	1	0	0	4	10
Italy (Retornaz)	0	0	1	0	4	0	0	1	1	0	7

=== Draw 7 ===
Sunday, 15 February, 19:05

Sheet A	1	2	3	4	5	6	7	8	9	10	Final
China (Xu)	0	0	0	0	2	0	0	0	1	X	3
Canada (Jacobs) 🔨	0	0	1	1	0	2	0	2	0	X	6

Sheet B	1	2	3	4	5	6	7	8	9	10	Final
Norway (Ramsfjell)	0	0	0	1	2	0	2	0	3	0	8
United States (Casper) 🔨	1	2	2	0	0	2	0	1	0	2	10

Sheet C	1	2	3	4	5	6	7	8	9	10	Final
Italy (Retornaz) 🔨	3	0	2	1	0	1	0	2	1	X	10
Czech Republic (Klíma)	0	2	0	0	1	0	2	0	0	X	5

Sheet D	1	2	3	4	5	6	7	8	9	10	11	Final
Great Britain (Mouat)	0	1	1	0	1	0	0	1	0	1	0	5
Switzerland (Schwaller) 🔨	1	0	0	1	0	0	2	0	1	0	1	6

=== Draw 8 ===
Monday, 16 February, 14:05

Sheet A	1	2	3	4	5	6	7	8	9	10	Final
Great Britain (Mouat) 🔨	0	0	0	2	0	2	0	0	2	0	6
Norway (Ramsfjell)	0	0	1	0	1	0	2	2	0	1	7

Sheet B	1	2	3	4	5	6	7	8	9	10	Final
Czech Republic (Klíma)	0	0	0	0	1	0	1	0	X	X	2
Canada (Jacobs) 🔨	1	1	1	1	0	3	0	1	X	X	8

Sheet C	1	2	3	4	5	6	7	8	9	10	Final
Sweden (Edin) 🔨	0	1	0	1	0	0	1	0	0	0	3
Germany (Muskatewitz)	0	0	2	0	1	1	0	1	1	1	7

Sheet D	1	2	3	4	5	6	7	8	9	10	Final
Italy (Retornaz) 🔨	0	0	0	2	0	2	0	X	X	X	4
China (Xu)	1	2	1	0	4	0	3	X	X	X	11

=== Draw 9 ===
Tuesday, 17 February, 9:05

Sheet B	1	2	3	4	5	6	7	8	9	10	Final
Switzerland (Schwaller) 🔨	2	2	0	0	2	0	3	X	X	X	9
Sweden (Edin)	0	0	1	0	0	3	0	X	X	X	4

Sheet C	1	2	3	4	5	6	7	8	9	10	Final
United States (Casper) 🔨	0	1	0	1	0	0	0	0	3	0	5
China (Xu)	0	0	1	0	0	1	0	3	0	3	8

Sheet D	1	2	3	4	5	6	7	8	9	10	Final
Czech Republic (Klíma)	0	1	0	1	0	0	3	1	0	3	9
Germany (Muskatewitz) 🔨	2	0	1	0	1	1	0	0	2	0	7

=== Draw 10 ===
Tuesday, 17 February, 19:05

Sheet A	1	2	3	4	5	6	7	8	9	10	Final
Germany (Muskatewitz)	0	0	1	0	1	0	0	2	X	X	4
Switzerland (Schwaller) 🔨	2	0	0	2	0	3	1	0	X	X	8

Sheet B	1	2	3	4	5	6	7	8	9	10	Final
United States (Casper) 🔨	1	0	1	0	0	0	2	0	1	0	5
Italy (Retornaz)	0	2	0	0	0	3	0	2	0	1	8

Sheet C	1	2	3	4	5	6	7	8	9	10	Final
Canada (Jacobs) 🔨	2	0	1	0	1	0	3	1	1	X	9
Great Britain (Mouat)	0	1	0	2	0	2	0	0	0	X	5

Sheet D	1	2	3	4	5	6	7	8	9	10	Final
Sweden (Edin) 🔨	0	2	0	2	0	1	0	2	0	X	7
Norway (Ramsfjell)	1	0	0	0	0	0	2	0	1	X	4

=== Draw 11 ===
Wednesday, 18 February, 14:05

Sheet A	1	2	3	4	5	6	7	8	9	10	Final
Italy (Retornaz) 🔨	0	1	2	0	0	0	0	X	X	X	3
Canada (Jacobs)	0	0	0	2	1	4	1	X	X	X	8

Sheet B	1	2	3	4	5	6	7	8	9	10	Final
China (Xu)	0	0	2	0	2	0	1	0	0	X	5
Czech Republic (Klíma) 🔨	2	1	0	2	0	2	0	2	1	X	10

Sheet C	1	2	3	4	5	6	7	8	9	10	Final
Norway (Ramsfjell)	0	1	0	2	0	0	1	0	X	X	4
Switzerland (Schwaller) 🔨	2	0	1	0	2	1	0	4	X	X	10

Sheet D	1	2	3	4	5	6	7	8	9	10	Final
United States (Casper) 🔨	0	0	0	0	2	0	X	X	X	X	2
Great Britain (Mouat)	1	1	4	0	0	3	X	X	X	X	9

=== Draw 12 ===
Thursday, 19 February, 9:05

Sheet A	1	2	3	4	5	6	7	8	9	10	Final
Sweden (Edin)	0	1	0	0	1	2	0	0	X	X	4
Czech Republic (Klíma) 🔨	1	0	2	2	0	0	2	3	X	X	10

Sheet B	1	2	3	4	5	6	7	8	9	10	Final
Italy (Retornaz)	0	0	0	1	0	2	0	2	0	X	5
Switzerland (Schwaller) 🔨	2	0	1	0	1	0	3	0	2	X	9

Sheet C	1	2	3	4	5	6	7	8	9	10	Final
China (Xu) 🔨	0	1	0	0	1	0	1	0	1	0	4
Germany (Muskatewitz)	1	0	2	0	0	1	0	1	0	1	6

Sheet D	1	2	3	4	5	6	7	8	9	10	Final
Norway (Ramsfjell) 🔨	3	0	2	0	2	0	0	1	0	X	8
Canada (Jacobs)	0	1	0	1	0	3	1	0	0	X	6

== Playoffs ==
Semifinals
1	Switzerland	5
4	Great Britain	8
2	Canada	5
3	Norway	4

Gold medal game
4	Great Britain	6
2	Canada	9
Bronze medal game
1	Switzerland	9
3	Norway	1

=== Semifinals ===
Thursday, 19 February, 19:35

Sheet B	1	2	3	4	5	6	7	8	9	10	Final
Switzerland (Schwaller) 🔨	0	2	0	2	0	0	1	0	0	0	5
Great Britain (Mouat)	0	0	2	0	1	1	0	2	0	2	8

Player percentages
Switzerland		Great Britain	
Pablo Lachat-Couchepin	88%	Hammy McMillan Jr.	85%
Sven Michel	94%	Bobby Lammie	78%
Yannick Schwaller	83%	Grant Hardie	83%
Benoît Schwarz-van Berkel	72%	Bruce Mouat	85%
Total	84%	Total	83%

Sheet D	1	2	3	4	5	6	7	8	9	10	11	Final
Canada (Jacobs) 🔨	0	1	1	0	0	1	0	0	1	0	1	5
Norway (Ramsfjell)	0	0	0	1	0	0	0	1	0	2	0	4

Player percentages
Canada		Norway	
Ben Hebert	91%	Gaute Nepstad	78%
Brett Gallant	88%	Bendik Ramsfjell	81%
Marc Kennedy	88%	Martin Sesaker	77%
Brad Jacobs	84%	Magnus Ramsfjell	79%
Total	88%	Total	79%

=== Bronze medal game ===
Friday, 20 February, 19:05

Sheet C	1	2	3	4	5	6	7	8	9	10	Final
Switzerland (Schwaller) 🔨	0	3	1	0	0	0	0	2	3	X	9
Norway (Ramsfjell)	0	0	0	0	1	0	0	0	0	X	1

Player percentages
Switzerland		Norway	
Pablo Lachat-Couchepin	89%	Gaute Nepstad	97%
Sven Michel	89%	Bendik Ramsfjell	71%
Yannick Schwaller	88%	Martin Sesaker	76%
Benoît Schwarz-van Berkel	96%	Magnus Ramsfjell	78%
Total	90%	Total	81%

=== Gold medal game ===
Saturday, 21 February, 19:05

Sheet C	1	2	3	4	5	6	7	8	9	10	Final
Great Britain (Mouat)	0	2	0	1	0	2	0	1	0	0	6
Canada (Jacobs) 🔨	1	0	2	0	1	0	1	0	3	1	9

Player percentages
Great Britain		Canada	
Hammy McMillan Jr.	99%	Ben Hebert	98%
Bobby Lammie	75%	Brett Gallant	78%
Grant Hardie	86%	Marc Kennedy	93%
Bruce Mouat	80%	Brad Jacobs	84%
Total	85%	Total	88%

== Final standings ==
The final standings are:

Place	Team
1st place, gold medalist(s)	Canada
2nd place, silver medalist(s)	Great Britain
3rd place, bronze medalist(s)	Switzerland
4	Norway
5	United States
6	Italy
7	Germany
8	Czech Republic
9	Sweden
10	China

== Statistics ==
=== Player percentages ===
Percentages by draw.

==== Lead ====
#	Curler	1	2	3	4	5	6	7	8	9	Total
1	Aidan Oldenburg (USA)	95	95	97	96	91	89	88	90	94	92.5
2	Pablo Lachat-Couchepin (SUI)	92	90	98	96	89	91	96	77	97	91.8
2	Hammy McMillan Jr. (GBR)	92	94	88	93	88	92	99	90	92	91.8
4	Ben Hebert (CAN)	89	92	91	96	94	88	92	89	–	91.4
5	Johannes Scheuerl (GER)	93	95	81	89	97	93	90	93	90	90.9
6	Christoffer Sundgren (SWE)	88	98	91	95	84	98	79	82	97	90.2
7	Lukáš Klípa (CZE)	93	75	98	91	91	86	91	83	89	89.2
8	Xu Jingtao (CHN)	79	88	89	88	96	96	83	90	84	87.6
9	Gaute Nepstad (NOR)	91	86	93	71	91	96	89	78	84	86.8
10	Mattia Giovanella (ITA)	98	84	98	83	85	86	75	93	72	85.9

==== Second ====
#	Curler	1	2	3	4	5	6	7	8	9	Total
1	Felix Messenzehl (GER)	86	89	86	88	81	90	86	91	90	87.4
2	Sebastiano Arman (ITA)	83	100	84	78	89	91	88	93	68	85.5
3	Sven Michel (SUI)	77	83	88	79	90	98	81	84	86	85.1
4	Rasmus Wranå (SWE)	81	86	84	93	83	83	88	86	78	84.4
5	Brett Gallant (CAN)	89	79	83	83	99	73	88	75	83	83.8
6	Bobby Lammie (GBR)	93	84	79	88	67	85	78	65	79	79.9
7	Ben Richardson (USA)	68	69	92	95	73	90	80	66	71	78.5
8	Li Zhichao (CHN)	79	91	71	75	71	96	63	89	74	78.2
9	Bendik Ramsfjell (NOR)	69	86	68	93	88	86	79	52	78	78.1
10	Martin Jurík (CZE)	74	70	78	66	89	78	69	74	84	75.5

==== Third ====
#	Curler	1	2	3	4	5	6	7	8	9	Total
1	Yannick Schwaller (SUI)	94	83	81	96	91	91	98	88	86	89.6
2	Grant Hardie (GBR)	79	84	91	85	97	93	91	89	85	88.7
3	Marc Kennedy (CAN)	82	92	90	78	92	89	79	83	84	85.3
4	Benjamin Kapp (GER)	89	98	86	88	74	89	79	69	85	84.4
5	Fei Xueqing (CHN)	90	84	80	83	74	91	79	89	74	82.2
6	Oskar Eriksson (SWE)	81	91	80	93	71	71	75	86	86	81.4
6	Amos Mosaner (ITA)	76	80	83	85	84	70	84	86	83	81.4
8	Marek Černovský (CZE)	86	69	68	76	93	89	88	82	81	81.3
9	Luc Violette (USA)	76	73	79	93	88	80	81	81	60	80.1
10	Martin Sesaker (NOR)	76	80	84	81	83	79	71	70	79	78.3

==== Fourth ====
#	Curler	1	2	3	4	5	6	7	8	9	Total
1	Benoît Schwarz-van Berkel (SUI)	97	100	81	97	77	96	88	80	86	88.5
2	Brad Jacobs (CAN)	93	90	89	85	82	88	83	86	79	86.2
3	Bruce Mouat (GBR)	93	94	84	86	86	84	84	69	90	85.1
4	Magnus Ramsfjell (NOR)	80	85	92	79	71	84	76	67	83	79.9
5	Joël Retornaz (ITA)	69	95	82	79	92	61	90	63	75	79.2
6	Xu Xiaoming (CHN)	69	78	81	88	72	92	84	63	73	77.5
7	Daniel Casper (USA)	81	70	76	81	81	78	67	74	69	75.8
8	Marc Muskatewitz (GER)	83	68	81	72	66	90	59	72	85	75.4
9	Niklas Edin (SWE)	69	61	79	99	63	76	75	81	53	74.2
10	Lukáš Klíma (CZE)	78	63	79	81	78	61	79	79	61	73.6

==== Alternate ====
#	Curler	1	2	3	4	5	6	7	8	9	Total
1	Rich Ruohonen (USA)	–	100 (1)	–	–	–	–	–	–	–	100.0
2	Kim Schwaller (SUI)	–	–	–	–	–	–	88 (1)	–	–	87.5
3	Tyler Tardi (CAN)	–	–	–	–	–	100 (1)	–	–	83 (1)	85.4
4	Simon Olofsson (SWE)	–	–	–	–	–	–	75 (2)	–	75 (2)	75.0
5	Radek Boháč (CZE)	–	50 (1)	–	–	–	88 (1)	–	–	–	68.8
6	Mario Trevisiol (GER)	–	–	–	–	–	–	–	50 (1)	–	50.0

==== Team total ====
#	Team	1	2	3	4	5	6	7	8	9	Total
1	Switzerland	90	89	87	92	87	94	91	82	89	88.7
2	Canada	88	88	88	85	92	85	85	83	82	86.5
3	Great Britain	89	89	85	88	84	89	88	78	86	86.4
4	Germany	88	87	84	84	80	90	78	80	88	84.4
5	Italy	81	90	87	81	88	77	84	83	75	83.0
6	Sweden	80	84	83	95	75	82	78	84	80	82.5
7	United States	80	77	86	91	83	84	79	78	73	81.7
8	China	80	85	80	83	78	94	77	83	76	81.4
9	Norway	79	84	84	81	83	86	79	67	81	80.8
10	Czech Republic	83	68	80	79	88	79	82	80	79	79.8
