= Felix Messenzehl =

German curler (born 2003)

- Curler
- Born: 21 September 2003 (age 23); Sonthofen, Germany

Team
- Curling club: EC Oberstdorf
- Skip: Benjamin Kapp
- Third: Felix Messenzehl
- Second: Johannes Scheuerl
- Lead: Mario Trevisiol

Curling career
- Member Association: Germany
- World Championship: 3 (2024, 2025, 2026)
- European Championship: 3 (2024, 2025, 2026)
- World Junior Curling Championship: 3 (2022, 2023, 2024)
- World Junior Mixed Doubles Curling Championship: 1 (2025)
- Olympic: 1 (2026)
Medal record
Men's curling
Representing Germany
European Championships
Gold medal – first place	2024 Lohja
World Junior Championships
Silver medal – second place	2022 Jönköping
Silver medal – second place	2023 Füssen

Felix Messenzehl (born 21 September 2003) is a German curler from Oberstdorf.

== Career ==
=== Juniors ===
Messenzehl began curling in 2014, and made his international début at the 2019 European Youth Olympic Winter Festival, where he was the skip of the German team. There, he led his team of Joy Sutor, Johannes Scheuerl and Zoé Antes to a 3–3 record, missing the playoffs.

Messenzehl was a member of the German junior men's team from 2022 to 2024, playing third on the rink, which was skipped by Benjamin Kapp. The team won silver medals at the 2022 and 2023 World Junior Curling Championships, the latter played on home ice in Füssen. The team did not fare as well at the 2024 World Junior Curling Championships, finishing 5th.

=== Mens ===
For the 2023–24 season Messenzehl, as well as his junior teammates Kapp and Scheuerl, played second for the Marc Muskatewitz rink for men's play. That season, the team won the Aberdeen Classic. The team also won the German Men's Curling Championship in 2024, earning the rink the right to represent the country at the 2024 World Men's Curling Championship. It would be a World Championship début for Messenzehl. The new team would have a strong showing at the 2024 Worlds, finishing in 5th place after losing to Italy's Joël Retornaz in the playoffs. However, the team would build upon this success at the 2024 European Curling Championships, they would beat Scotland's Bruce Mouat 9–7 in the final to win Germany's first European medal since 2008, and their first gold since 2004. After winning the European Championships, the team qualified for their first Tier 1 Grand Slam of Curling event, the 2024 National, where they had a strong showing, losing in the quarterfinals to Mike McEwen 6–5. The team also continued to perform well on the world curling circuit, winning the 2024 Karuizawa International Curling Championships. Muskatewtiz would then win the 2025 German Men's Championship against Sixten Totzek, qualifying the Muskatewitz rink to represent Germany at the 2025 World Men's Curling Championship. At the 2025 World's, team Muskatewitz would finish the round robin with a 5–7 record, finishing outside of the playoffs in 8th place. However, the Muskatewitz rink's performance over the last two world championships earned Germany enough points to qualify directly for the 2026 Winter Olympics. There, they would finish in 7th place with a 4–5 record. Team Muskatewitz would finish the season at the 2026 World Men's Curling Championship, where they would again finish outside of the playoffs in 9th place with a 4–8 record. At the end of the season, with Muskatewitz announcing that he will be taking a step back from competitive men's curling due to "personal reasons", Messenzehl moved up to the third position of the German men's national team skipped now by Kapp, alongside Scheuerl, and Mario Trevisiol.

== Personal life ==
Messenzehl attended a sports high school in Oberstdorf, and currently works as a sport soldier. His father is curler Markus Messenzehl, a two-time European Champion, who also represented Germany at the 2002 Winter Olympics.
