= Marc Muskatewitz =

German curler (born 1996)

- Curler
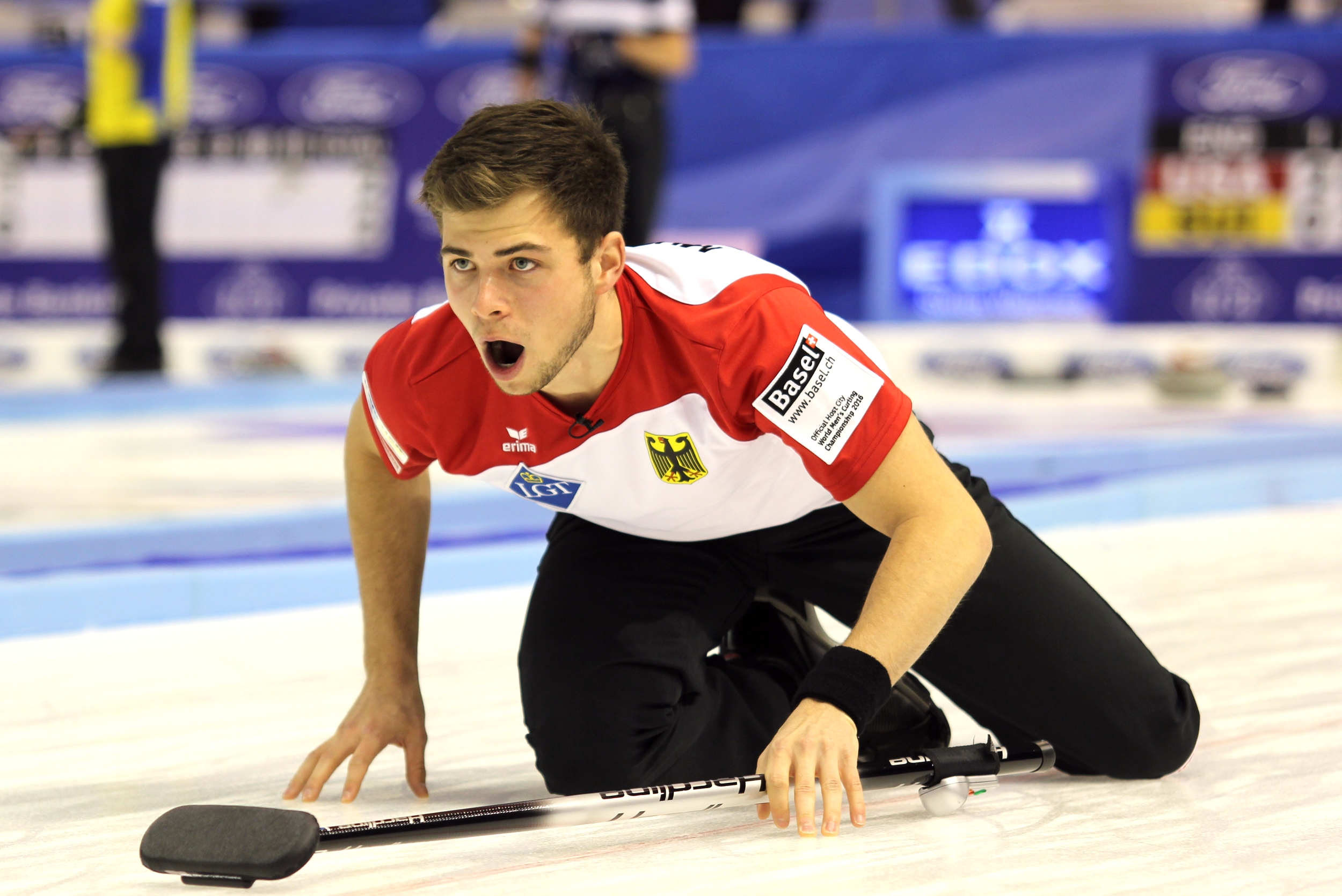
- Muskatewitz at the 2016 World Men's Curling Championship
- Born: 28 January 1996 (age 30); Baden-Baden, Germany

Team
- Curling club: CC Füssen, Füssen, GER

Curling career
- Member Association: Germany
- World Championship: 8 (2016, 2019, 2021, 2022, 2023, 2024, 2025, 2026)
- European Championship: 7 (2014, 2015, 2018, 2019, 2021, 2024, 2025)
- Olympic: 1 (2026)
Medal record
Curling
Representing Germany
European Championships
Gold medal – first place	2024 Lohja

Marc Muskatewitz (born 28 January 1996) is a German curler from Kempten.

== Career ==
=== Juniors ===
Muskatewitz started playing curling in 2003, where he had a successful junior career, where he skipped the German junior men's curling team at two European Junior Curling Challenge events, and later at two World Junior B Curling Championships. While he was still junior age, he won the German Men's Championship as a second on the Alexander Baumann team, and represented Germany on the national men's team at multiple European and World Championships.

=== Men's ===
Muskatewitz started skipping the national men's curling team at the 2018–19 curling season, with teammates Sixten Totzek, Daniel Neuner, and Ryan Sherrard. The team found success, finishing fourth at the 2018 European Curling Championships, the team also represented Germany at 2019 Worlds, where they finished in 8th place with a 4–8 record. Following the season, Muskatewitz would step back to third position on the team, and Totzek would be the new skip of the new German team, where they would continue to have strong showings at the European and World Men's championships.

Muskatewitz would return as skip of the German team at 2023–24 curling season, and would join forces with a new team of Benjamin Kapp, Felix Messenzehl, Johannes Scheuerl, Mario Trevisiol, and coached by former teammate Ryan Sherrard. The new team would have a strong showing at the 2024 World Men's Curling Championships, finishing in 5th place after losing to Italy's Joël Retornaz in the playoffs. However, the team would build upon this success at the 2024 European Curling Championships, they would beat Scotland's Bruce Mouat 9–7 in the final to win Germany's first European medal since 2008, and their first gold since 2004. After winning the European Championships, the team qualified for their first Tier 1 Grand Slam of Curling event, the 2024 National, where they had a strong showing, losing in the quarterfinals to Mike McEwen 6–5. The team also continued to perform well on the world curling circuit, winning the 2024 Karuizawa International Curling Championships. Muskatewtiz would then win the 2025 German Men's Championship against former skip Sixten Totzek, qualifying his team to represent Germany at the 2025 World Men's Curling Championship. At the 2025 World's, team Muskatewitz would finish the round robin with a 5–7 record, finishing outside of the playoffs in 8th place. However, Muskatewitz's performance over the last two world championships earned Germany enough points to qualify directly for the 2026 Winter Olympics. There, they would finish in 7th place with a 4–5 record. Muskatewitz would finish the season at the 2026 World Men's Curling Championship, where they would again finish outside of the playoffs in 9th place with a 4–8 record. At the end of the season, Muskatewitz announced that he will be taking a step back from competitive men's curling due to "personal reasons".

== Personal life ==
Muskatewitz is currently a student.

== Teams ==
Season	Skip	Third	Second	Lead	Alternate	Coach	Events
2013–14	Marc Muskatewitz	Daniel Rothballer	Michael Holzinger	Pirmin Schlicke	Sebastian Oswald	Katja Weisser	EJCC 2014 (5th)
2013–14	Marc Muskatewitz	Daniel Rothballer	Michael Wiest	Sebastian Oswald			GJCC 2014 (gold)
2013–14	Marc Muskatewitz	Kevin Bold	Mike Burba	Cristoph Schmidt	Hans-Joachim Burba		GMCC 2014 (4th)
2014–15	Alexander Baumann	Manuel Walter	Marc Muskatewitz	Sebastian Schweizer	Jörg Engesser	Martin Beiser	ECC 2014 (8th)
2014–15	Marc Muskatewitz	Daniel Rothballer	Michael Wiest	Sebastian Oswald	Merlin Litke	Thomas Lips	EJCC 2015 (5th)
2015–16	Alexander Baumann	Manuel Walter	Marc Muskatewitz	Sebastian Schweizer	Daniel Herberg	Katja Schweizer (ECC); Thomas Lips (WCC)	ECC 2015 (6th); WCC 2016 (12th)
2015–16	Marc Muskatewitz	Sixten Totzek	Michael Wiest	Sebastian Oswald	Joshua Sutor	Katja Schweizer	WJBCC 2016 (4th)
2016–17	Marc Muskatewitz	Sixten Totzek	Jan-Lucia Haag	Marc Weiler	Magnus Sutor	Wolfgang Burba	WJBCC 2017 (4th)
2018–19	Marc Muskatewitz	Sixten Totzek	Daniel Neuner	Ryan Sherrard	Sebastian Schweizer	Martin Beiser	ECC 2018 (4th)
2018–19	Marc Muskatewitz	Daniel Neuner	Ryan Sherrard	Dominik Greindl	Benjamin Kapp	Andy Kapp	WCC 2019 (8th)
2019–20	Marc Muskatewitz	Sixten Totzek	Joshua Sutor	Dominik Greindl	Benjamin Kapp	Uli Kapp, Lukas Fritsch	ECC 2019 (7th)
2020–21	Sixten Totzek	Marc Muskatewitz	Joshua Sutor	Dominik Greindl	Klaudius Harsch	Uli Kapp	WCC 2021 (10th)
2021–22	Sixten Totzek	Marc Muskatewitz	Joshua Sutor	Dominik Greindl	Magnus Sutor	Uli Kapp, Holger Höhne	ECC 2021 (8th); WCC 2022 (7th)
2022–23	Sixten Totzek	Klaudius Harsch	Magnus Sutor	Dominik Greindl	Marc Muskatewitz	Uli Kapp	WCC 2023 (9th)
2023–24	Marc Muskatewitz	Benjamin Kapp	Felix Messenzehl	Johannes Scheuerl	Mario Trevisiol	Ryan Sherrard	WCC 2024 (5th)
2024–25	Marc Muskatewitz	Benjamin Kapp	Felix Messenzehl	Johannes Scheuerl	Mario Trevisiol	Ryan Sherrard	ECC 2024 (gold); WCC 2025 (8th)
2025–26	Marc Muskatewitz	Benjamin Kapp	Felix Messenzehl	Johannes Scheuerl	Mario Trevisiol	Ryan Sherrard	ECC 2025 (5th); WOG 2026 (7th); WCC 2026 (9th)

== Grand Slam record ==
Key
C	Champion
F	Lost in Final
SF	Lost in Semifinal
QF	Lost in Quarterfinals
R16	Lost in the round of 16
Q	Did not advance to playoffs
T2	Played in Tier 2 event
DNP	Did not participate in event
N/A	Not a Grand Slam event that season

Event	2024–25	2025–26
Masters	QF	Q
Tour Challenge	T2	Q
The National	QF	Q
Canadian Open	DNP	QF
Players'	Q	DNP
