= Benjamin Kapp =

German curler (born 2002)

- Curler
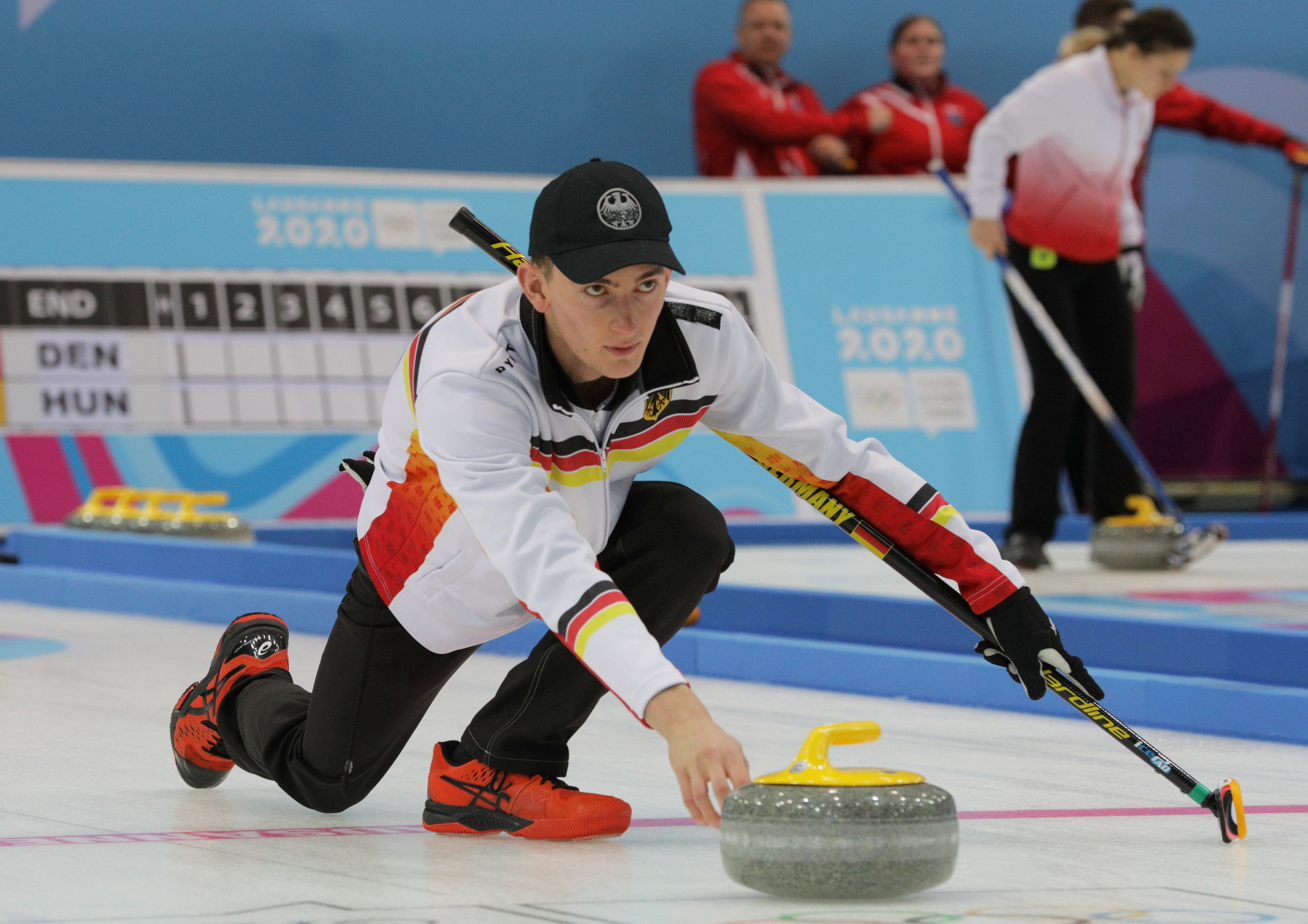
- Kapp at the 2020 Winter Youth Olympics
- Born: 9 July 2002 (age 24); Unterthingau, Germany

Team
- Curling club: CC Füssen, Füssen
- Skip: Benjamin Kapp
- Third: Felix Messenzehl
- Second: Johannes Scheuerl
- Lead: Mario Trevisiol

Curling career
- Member Association: Germany
- World Championship: 5 (2019, 2022, 2024, 2025, 2026)
- European Championship: 5 (2019, 2023, 2024, 2025, 2026)
- Olympic: 1 (2026)
- Other appearances: World Mixed Championship: 1 (2019); Winter Youth Olympics: 1 (2020); World Junior Championship: 3 (2022, 2023, 2024)
Medal record
Men's curling
Representing Germany
European Championships
Gold medal – first place	2024 Lohja
World Junior Championships
Silver medal – second place	2022 Jönköping
Silver medal – second place	2023 Füssen
World Mixed Championship
Silver medal – second place	2019 Aberdeen

Benjamin "Benny" Kapp (born 9 July 2002) is a German curler from Unterthingau.

== Career ==
=== Juniors ===
Kapp had a successful junior career, skipping the German national junior men's team at three World Junior Curling Championships, and is a 2022 and 2023 silver medalist. Kapp also skipped the German mixed team at the 2020 Winter Youth Olympics, finishing 8th after losing to New Zealand's Hunter Walker 7–4 in the quarterfinals.

=== Mens ===
While a still of junior age, Kapp would be the alternate on the German men's national team at the 2019 and 2023 editions of the European Curling Championships, and the 2022 World Men's Curling Championship.

Kapp would join as the third of the new German team skipped by Marc Muskatewitz during the 2023–24 curling season, alongside junior teammates Felix Messenzehl and Johannes Scheuerl. The new team would have a strong showing at the 2024 World Men's Curling Championships, finishing in 5th place after losing to Italy's Joël Retornaz in the playoffs. However, the team would build upon this success at the 2024 European Curling Championships, they would beat Scotland's Bruce Mouat 9–7 in the final to win Germany's first European medal since 2008, and their first gold since 2004. After winning the European Championships, the team qualified for their first Tier 1 Grand Slam of Curling event, the 2024 National, where they had a strong showing, losing in the quarterfinals to Mike McEwen 6–5. The team also continued to perform well on the world curling circuit, winning the 2024 Karuizawa International Curling Championships. Muskatewtiz would then win the 2025 German Men's Championship against Sixten Totzek, qualifying the Muskatewitz rink to represent Germany at the 2025 World Men's Curling Championship. At the 2025 World's, team Muskatewitz would finish the round robin with a 5–7 record, finishing outside of the playoffs in 8th place. However, the Muskatewitz rink's performance over the last two world championships earned Germany enough points to qualify directly for the 2026 Winter Olympics. There, they would finish in 7th place with a 4–5 record. Team Muskatewitz would finish the season at the 2026 World Men's Curling Championship, where they would again finish outside of the playoffs in 9th place with a 4–8 record. At the end of the season, with Muskatewitz announcing that he will be taking a step back from competitive men's curling due to "personal reasons", Kapp moved up to the skip position of the German men's national team, alongside Messenzehl, Scheuerl, and Mario Trevisiol.

== Personal life ==
His father is two-time European champion curler and coach Andy Kapp. The two were teammates at the 2019 World Mixed Curling Championship where their team won the silver medal.

Kapp works as a sport soldier.

== Grand Slam record ==
Key
C	Champion
F	Lost in Final
SF	Lost in Semifinal
QF	Lost in Quarterfinals
R16	Lost in the round of 16
Q	Did not advance to playoffs
T2	Played in Tier 2 event
DNP	Did not participate in event
N/A	Not a Grand Slam event that season

Event	2024–25	2025–26	2026–27
Invitational	T2	Q	DNP
Masters	QF	Q	DNP
National	QF	Q	DNP
Open	DNP	QF	
Players'	Q	DNP	

== Teams ==
=== Men's ===
Season	Skip	Third	Second	Lead	Alternate	Coach	Events
2016–17	Magnus Sutor	Benjamin Kapp	Willi Eitel	Chris Gregor			
2017–18	Benjamin Kapp	Daniel Schmidt	Willi Eitel	Johannes Gabriel			
2018–19	Benjamin Kapp	Felix Messenzehl	Willi Eitel	Johannes Scheuerl			
2018–19	Marc Muskatewitz	Daniel Neuner	Ryan Sherrard	Dominik Greindl	Benjamin Kapp	Andy Kapp	WCC 2019 (8th)
2019–20	Benjamin Kapp	Felix Messenzehl	Willi Eitel	Johannes Scheuerl			
2019–20	Marc Muskatewitz	Sixten Totzek	Joshua Sutor	Dominik Greindl	Benjamin Kapp	Uli Kapp, Lukas Fritsch	ECC 2019 (7th)
2023–24	Marc Muskatewitz	Benjamin Kapp	Felix Messenzehl	Johannes Scheuerl	Mario Trevisiol	Ryan Sherrard	WCC 2024 (5th)
2024–25	Marc Muskatewitz	Benjamin Kapp	Felix Messenzehl	Johannes Scheuerl	Mario Trevisiol	Ryan Sherrard	ECC 2024 (gold); WCC 2025 (8th)
2025–26	Marc Muskatewitz	Benjamin Kapp	Felix Messenzehl	Johannes Scheuerl	Mario Trevisiol	Ryan Sherrard	ECC 2025 (5th); WOG 2026 (7th); WCC 2026 (9th)
2026–27	Benjamin Kapp	Felix Messenzehl	Johannes Scheuerl	Mario Trevisiol			

=== Mixed ===
Season	Skip	Third	Second	Lead	Coach	Events
2019–20	Andy Kapp	Pia-Lisa Schöll	Benny Kapp	Petra Tschetsch		WMxCC 2019 (silver)
2019–20	Benny Kapp	Kim Sutor	Johannes Scheuerl	Zoé Antes	Andy Kapp	WYOG 2020 (8th)

=== Mixed doubles ===
Season	Male	Female	Coach	Events
2016–17	Benny Kapp	Laura Mayrhans		
2017–18	Benny Kapp	Laura Mayrhans		
2018–19	Benny Kapp	Lena Kapp		
2019–20	Benny Kapp	Mia Höhne		
2019–20	Benny Kapp	Sara Rigler	Andy Kapp	WYOG 2020 (25th)
