= Mario Trevisiol =

German curler (born 2003)

- Curler
- Born: 20 April 2003 (age 23); Konstanz, Germany

Team
- Curling club: CC Füssen, Füssen, GER
- Skip: Benjamin Kapp
- Third: Felix Messenzehl
- Second: Johannes Scheuerl
- Lead: Mario Trevisiol

Curling career
- Member Association: Germany
- World Championship: 3 (2024, 2025, 2026)
- European Championship: 3 (2024, 2025, 2026)
- Olympic: 1 (2026)
Medal record
Curling
European Championships
Gold medal – first place	2024 Lohja
World Junior Championships
Silver medal – second place	2023 Füssen

Mario Trevisiol (born 20 April 2003 in Konstanz) is a German curler from Kempten.

== Career ==
=== Juniors ===
Trevisiol made his début representing Germany on the international stage at the 2023 World Junior Curling Championships on home ice in Füssen, as the lead on a team skipped by Benjamin Kapp, alongside Felix Messenzehl and Johannes Scheuerl. There, the team would finish in first place after the round robin with a 7–1 record, qualifying for the playoffs. After beating Norway in the semifinal, they would lose to China's Fei Xueqing 8–7 in the final, winning the silver medal. The team would return to represent Germany at the 2024 World Junior Curling Championships, but this time would fail to qualify for the playoffs, finishing 5th with a 5–4 round robin record.

=== Men's ===
Trevisiol would join as the alternate of the new German team skipped by Marc Muskatewitz during the 2023–24 curling season, alongside junior teammates Kapp, Messenzehl, and Scheuerl. That season, the team won the 2023 Aberdeen Classic. The team also won the German Men's Curling Championship in 2024, earning the rink the right to represent the country at the 2024 World Men's Curling Championship. The new team would have a strong showing at the 2024 World Men's Curling Championships, finishing in 5th place after losing to Italy's Joël Retornaz in the playoffs. However, the team would build upon this success at the 2024 European Curling Championships, they would beat Scotland's Bruce Mouat 9–7 in the final to win Germany's first European medal since 2008, and their first gold since 2004. After winning the European Championships, the team qualified for their first Tier 1 Grand Slam of Curling event, the 2024 National, where they had a strong showing, losing in the quarterfinals to Mike McEwen 6–5. The team also continued to perform well on the world curling circuit, winning the 2024 Karuizawa International Curling Championships. Muskatewitz would then win the 2025 German Men's Championship against Sixten Totzek, qualifying the Muskatewitz rink to represent Germany at the 2025 World Men's Curling Championship. At the 2025 World's, team Muskatewitz would finish the round robin with a 5–7 record, finishing outside of the playoffs in 8th place. However, the Muskatewitz rink's performance over the last two world championships earned Germany enough points to qualify directly for the 2026 Winter Olympics. There, they would finish in 7th place with a 4–5 record. Team Muskatewitz would finish the season at the 2026 World Men's Curling Championship, where they would again finish outside of the playoffs in 9th place with a 4–8 record. At the end of the season, with Muskatewitz announcing that he will be taking a step back from competitive men's curling due to "personal reasons", Trevisiol was "promoted to a full-time role" as lead on the German men's national team skipped now by Kapp, alongside Messenzehl as third, and Scheuerl as second.

== Personal life ==
Trevisiol lives in Kempten, and works as a sport soldier. He started curling in 2012 at the age of 9.

== Teams and events ==
Season	Skip	Third	Second	Lead	Alternate	Coach	Events
2022–23	Benjamin Kapp	Felix Messenzehl	Johannes Scheuerl	Mario Trevisiol	Adrian Enders	Andy Kapp	WJCC 2023 (silver)
2023–24	Benjamin Kapp	Felix Messenzehl	Johannes Scheuerl	Mario Trevisiol	Adrian Enders	Andy Kapp	WJCC 2024 (5th)
2023–24	Marc Muskatewitz	Benjamin Kapp	Felix Messenzehl	Johannes Scheuerl	Mario Trevisiol	Ryan Sherrard	WCC 2024 (5th)
2024–25	Marc Muskatewitz	Benjamin Kapp	Felix Messenzehl	Johannes Scheuerl	Mario Trevisiol	Ryan Sherrard	ECC 2024 (gold); WCC 2025 (8th)
2025–26	Marc Muskatewitz	Benjamin Kapp	Felix Messenzehl	Johannes Scheuerl	Mario Trevisiol	Ryan Sherrard	ECC 2025 (5th); WOG 2026 (7th); WCC 2026 (9th)
2026–27	Benjamin Kapp	Felix Messenzehl	Johannes Scheuerl	Mario Trevisiol			
