= Joël Retornaz =

Italian curler (born 1983)

- Curler
- Born: Joël Thierry Retornaz; 30 September 1983 (age 43); Chêne-Bougeries, Genève, Switzerland

Team
- Curling club: Trentino Curling Cembra, Cembra
- Skip: Joël Retornaz
- Third: Stefano Gilli
- Second: Andrea Gilli
- Lead: Alberto Pimpini

Curling career
- Member Association: Italy
- World Championship: 11 (2005, 2010, 2015, 2017, 2018, 2019, 2021, 2022, 2023, 2024, 2025)
- European Championship: 17 (2005, 2007, 2010, 2011, 2012, 2013, 2014, 2015, 2016, 2017, 2018, 2019, 2021, 2022, 2023, 2024, 2025)
- Olympic: 4 (2006, 2018, 2022, 2026)
- Grand Slam victories: 4 (2022 Masters, 2023 Tour Challenge, 2023 National, 2023 Masters)
Medal record
Men's curling
Representing Italy
World Men's Curling Championship
Bronze medal – third place	2022 Las Vegas
Bronze medal – third place	2024 Schaffhausen
European Curling Championships
Bronze medal – third place	2018 Tallinn
Bronze medal – third place	2021 Lillehammer
Bronze medal – third place	2022 Östersund

Joël Thierry Retornaz (born 30 September 1983 in Chêne-Bougeries, Genève, Switzerland) is an Italian curler from Cembra. He was the skip of the Italian men's Olympic curling team in 2006, 2018, 2022, and 2026.

== Career ==
Retornaz gained sudden renown in Italy during the 2006 Winter Olympics. Although Italy has little curling tradition, and the sport was practiced only by a few hundred amateurs, Retornaz led the semi-professional Italian team to several unexpected victories over strong teams, including Canada. This breakthrough inspired a sudden national curiosity for curling, previously almost unknown in Italy.

Retornaz returned to the Olympics in 2018, skipping the Italians again while throwing third rocks. The team finished 9th with a 3-6 record. The team finished 3–6 again at the 2022 Olympics, placing 9th again.

Retornaz has represented Italy in eleven World Curling Championships, in 2005, 2010, 2015, 2017, 2018, 2019, 2021, 2022, 2023, 2024, and 2025 skipping the team in each event except 2005. They have twice won bronze medals at the 2022 and 2024 World Men's Curling Championship, Italy's first medals at the curling worlds of either gender.

Retornaz has competed for Italy in 16 European Curling Championships (as of 2024), finally winning a bronze medal in his 11th try in 2018, skipping the rink of Amos Mosaner, Sebastiano Arman, Simone Gonin and Fabio Ribotta. Retornaz won a second bronze in 2021 and a third in 2022.

== Personal life ==
In addition to curling, Retornaz breeds and races quarter horses. He is employed as a businessman. He is currently married and lives in Lugano, Switzerland. Retornaz speaks five languages, his first language is Italian, which was spoken to him by his mother, his father is from Switzerland and from whom he learned French when he was raised in Geneva, he also speaks English, German and Chinese, which he learned in school.

== Grand Slam record ==
Retornaz won Italy's first Grand Slam championship at the 2022 Masters.

Key
C	Champion
F	Lost in Final
SF	Lost in Semifinal
QF	Lost in Quarterfinals
R16	Lost in the round of 16
Q	Did not advance to playoffs
T2	Played in Tier 2 event
DNP	Did not participate in event
N/A	Not a Grand Slam event that season

Event	2021–22	2022–23	2023–24	2024–25	2025–26	2026–27
Invitational	N/A	QF	C	Q	SF	DNP
Masters	DNP	C	C	Q	QF	DNP
National	DNP	Q	C	QF	Q	DNP
Open	N/A	SF	QF	SF	QF	
Players'	Q	SF	F	Q	QF	
Champions Cup	DNP	Q	N/A	N/A	N/A	N/A
