= Romano Meier =

Swiss male curler (born 1995)

- Curler
- Born: 14 April 1995 (age 31); Baden, Switzerland

Team
- Curling club: CC Baden Regio, Baden, SUI
- Mixed doubles partner: Michèle Jäggi

Curling career
- Member Association: Switzerland
- World Championship: 2 (2017, 2022)
- European Championship: 1 (2019)
Medal record
Men's curling
Representing Switzerland
World Championships
Bronze medal – third place	2017 Edmonton
European Championships
Silver medal – second place	2019 Helsingborg
World Junior Championships
Gold medal – first place	2014 Flims
Silver medal – second place	2015 Tallinn
Winter Youth Olympics
Gold medal – first place	2012 Innsbruck
European Mixed Championship
Bronze medal – third place	2014 Tårnby

Romano Keller-Meier (born 14 April 1995 in Baden) is a Swiss curler from Ehrendingen.

== Career ==
=== Juniors ===
In 2012, Meier represented Switzerland for the first time internationally at the 2012 Winter Youth Olympics. The team also included Michael Brunner, Elena Stern and Lisa Gisler. The team finished the round robin with a 6–1 record and then won all three of their playoff games to secure the gold medal.

Meier was a member of the Swiss junior men's team, skipped by Yannick Schwaller, at three straight World Junior Curling Championships. In 2014, his team of Schwaller, Reto Keller, Patrick Witschonke and Michael Probst led Switzerland to a 6–3 round robin record. They then beat Italy's Amos Mosaner in a tiebreaker to qualify for the playoffs. There, they defeated Canada's Braden Calvert and Norway's Eirik Mjøen in the 3 vs. 4 page playoff and semifinal games respectively, qualifying for the final. In the final, they won 6–5 over Scotland's Kyle Smith rink to become the World Junior champions, becoming just the fifth Swiss men's team to do so.

The Schwaller rink returned to the World Juniors the following season with Meier now as the team's third. The team fared better through the round robin at the 2015 World Junior Curling Championships, finishing second overall with a 7–2 record. They then lost to Canada's Calvert team in the 1 vs. 2 game, but bounced back with a win over Sweden's Fredrik Nyman to once again play in the World Junior final. There, they were defeated 6–3 by the Canadian team, settling for silver.

Team Schwaller began competing on the World Curling Tour during the 2015–16 season and found success, reaching the playoffs in four of their events. They made the semifinal round of the Curling Masters Champéry and the quarterfinals of the Swiss Cup Basel, as well as the finals of two regional Swiss events. His team competed once more in the 2016 World Junior Curling Championships where they made the playoffs for a third straight year with a 6–3 record. Despite beating Canada's Matt Dunstone in the 3 vs. 4 page playoff game, they lost both the semifinal and bronze medal game to the United States' Korey Dropkin and Canada respectively, settling for fourth.

=== Men's ===
Out of juniors, Meier continued competing on the World Curling Tour with Team Schwaller. They did not have very much success in their first season together and the team's third Reto Keller was replaced by Michael Brunner for the 2017–18 season. Meier did, however, compete in his first World Championship at the 2017 World Men's Curling Championship as the alternate for the Peter de Cruz rink. The team finished the round robin in third place with an 8–3 record and went on to earn the bronze medal after defeating the United States' John Shuster 7–5 in the bronze medal game. Meier played in one game for the team, which they won, 9–2 over Russia's Alexey Timofeev. Team Schwaller won their first tour event at the 2017 Qinghai International, losing only one game en route to claiming the title. They also reached the finals of both the DeKalb Superspiel and the Aberdeen International Curling Championship as well as the semifinals of the Oakville Fall Classic and the German Masters. The team also had a strong performance at the 2018 Swiss Men's Curling Championship, finishing the round robin in first place with a 9–1 record. They then won the 1 vs. 2 page playoff game to qualify for the final where they faced the Marc Pfister rink. After beating Team Pfister in both the round robin and page playoff game, they lost 7–5 in the championship final, settling for second.

Team Schwaller won two more tour events during the 2018–19 season, the Stu Sells Oakville Tankard and the Schweizer Cup. Because of their success from the previous season, the team joined the elite ranks and competed in their first ever Grand Slam of Curling events. They played in the 2018 Masters, 2018 National and the 2019 Champions Cup, however, missed the playoffs at all three events. The team also played in three legs of the Curling World Cup. In the second leg, they finished in seventh place with a 2–4 record. In the third leg, they finished in fourth with a 4–2 record and in the grand final, they went 3–3. At the Swiss Men's Championship, the team finished second in the round robin with a 6–1 record but was able to avenge that loss in the 1 vs. 2 page playoff game by defeating the de Cruz rink. In the final, they once again played Team de Cruz where they lost in an extra end 8–7. Also during the 2018–19 season, Meier and his team competed in the 2019 Winter Universiade. There, they went 6–3 through the round robin and won their qualification game before losing both the semifinal and bronze medal games, settling for fourth.

Meier and his team began the 2019–20 season by winning two more tour events, the Baden Masters and the 2019 Cameron's Brewing Oakville Fall Classic. Later in the fall, the team was selected to represent Switzerland at the 2019 European Curling Championships. There, they posted a 6–3 round robin record. This qualified them for the playoffs where they beat Denmark's Mikkel Krause in the semifinals, before losing to Sweden's Niklas Edin rink in the final, settling for silver. In Grand Slam play, the team competed in four events and reached the playoffs for the first time at the 2020 Canadian Open. There, they lost out to Brad Gushue in the quarterfinals. At the Swiss Championship, the team went 7–2 through the round robin and championship pools, qualifying them for the final against the de Cruz rink. There, they won their first national title by defeating Team de Cruz 5–3. The team was set to represent Switzerland at the 2020 World Men's Curling Championship before the event got cancelled due to the COVID-19 pandemic. The team won the last tour event of the season before it was cancelled due to the pandemic, the 2020 Aberdeen International Curling Championship.

To begin the abbreviated 2020–21 season, Team Schwaller finished runner-up at the 2020 Schweizer Cup, losing in the final to Andrin Schnider. They also lost in the finals of the Adelboden International and the 2.0 Cup, both to the de Cruz rink. They were then, however, able to win the 2020 Curling Masters Champéry, their only tour win of the season. In January 2021, Meier competed at the 2021 Swiss Mixed Doubles Curling Championship with partner Lisa Gisler. After starting the tournament with three straight wins, the pair lost their next four games, eliminating them from contention. At the Swiss Championship, the team could not defend their title, losing all three of their matches against the de Cruz rink, including the final. As they had won the Swiss Championship in 2020 but could not participate in the World Championship due to the cancellation, Team Schwaller played Team de Cruz in a best-of-five series to determine which team would represent Switzerland at the 2021 World Men's Curling Championship. After winning the first two games, Team de Cruz defeated Team Schwaller in the other three matches to win the series three games to two, earning themselves the spot at the World Championship. Meier and his team ended their season at the 2021 Champions Cup and 2021 Players' Championship Grand Slam events, which were played in a "curling bubble" in Calgary, Alberta, with no spectators, to avoid the spread of the coronavirus. The team failed to reach the playoffs at both events.

The Schwaller rink had a strong start to the 2021–22 season, winning both the 2021 Baden Masters and the 2021 Euro Super Series tour events. Next, Team Schwaller competed in the 2021 Swiss Olympic Curling Trials where they would face the de Cruz rink in a best-of-seven series to determine who would represent Switzerland at the 2022 Winter Olympics. Despite entering the Trials winning the first two events of the season, Team de Cruz won the first four matches of the event, securing their spot as the Olympic representatives. Back on tour, Team Schwaller reached the semifinals of four events, not able to reach the final in any of them. They played in both the 2021 Masters and 2021 National Slams but failed to reach the playoffs at both events. In the new year, they finished runner-up at the St. Galler Elite Challenge before entering the Swiss Championship. There, the team dominated the field, losing only one game en route to claiming their second Swiss Men's title. With the win, they went on to represent Switzerland at the 2022 World Men's Curling Championship. After having a strong start by winning five out of their first seven games, they finished the round robin in sixth place with a 6–6 record, narrowly qualifying for the playoffs. They then faced Italy's Joël Retornaz in the qualification game, where they lost 10–4 and were eliminated from contention. They ended their season at the 2022 Players' Championship where they lost all three of their games.

In April 2022, Schwaller announced that he would be leaving the Bern Zähringer team. The team's second Michael Brunner then took over as the team's skip, with Meier playing third, Anthony Petoud at second and Marcel Käufeler at lead for the 2022–23 season.

=== Mixed ===
On top of men's curling, Meier has also competed in mixed events on four occasions. He made his first appearance at the 2012 European Mixed Curling Championship where he reached the quarterfinals with his team of Martin Rios, Manuela Siegrist and Manuela Kormann. He returned two years later at the 2014 European Mixed Curling Championship with Rios, Silvana Tirinzoni and Jenny Perret where the team won the bronze medal. He then competed in back-to-back World Mixed Curling Championships in 2015 and 2016. At the 2015 World Mixed Curling Championship, he and his team of Yannick Schwaller, Briar Hürlimann and Céline Koller finished 7–1 in group play. They then beat Scotland in the qualification games before being defeated by Sweden in the quarterfinals. At the 2016 World Mixed Curling Championship, his team, now with Rios, Elena Stern and Michèle Jäggi went 6–1 through the round robin and then went on to lose in the quarterfinals to the eventual champions from Russia.

== Personal life ==
Meier is currently a student.

== Grand Slam record ==
Key
C	Champion
F	Lost in Final
SF	Lost in Semifinal
QF	Lost in Quarterfinals
R16	Lost in the round of 16
Q	Did not advance to playoffs
T2	Played in Tier 2 event
DNP	Did not participate in event
N/A	Not a Grand Slam event that season

Event	2018–19	2019–20	2020–21	2021–22	2022–23	2023–24	2024–25	2025–26
Masters	Q	Q	N/A	Q	Q	DNP	DNP	T2
Tour Challenge	DNP	Q	N/A	N/A	Q	T2	Q	DNP
The National	Q	Q	N/A	Q	QF	DNP	Q	DNP
Canadian Open	DNP	QF	N/A	N/A	DNP	Q	Q	T2
Players'	DNP	N/A	Q	Q	DNP	DNP	DNP	DNP
Champions Cup	Q	N/A	Q	DNP	DNP	N/A	N/A	N/A

== Teams ==
Season	Skip	Third	Second	Lead
2011–12	Michael Brunner	Romano Meier	Remo Herzog	Marcel Käufeler
2012–13	Michael Brunner	Romano Meier	Remo Herzog	Marcel Käufeler
2013–14	Romano Meier (Fourth)	Michael Brunner (Skip)	Kyrill Oehninger	Marcel Käufeler
2014–15	Romano Meier (Fourth)	Yannick Schwaller (Skip)	Patrick Witschonke	Michael Probst
2015–16	Yannick Schwaller	Romano Meier	Patrick Witschonke	Michael Probst
2016–17	Yannick Schwaller	Romano Meier	Reto Keller	Marcel Käufeler
2017–18	Yannick Schwaller	Romano Meier	Michael Brunner	Marcel Käufeler
2018–19	Yannick Schwaller	Michael Brunner	Romano Meier	Marcel Käufeler
2019–20	Yannick Schwaller	Michael Brunner	Romano Meier	Marcel Käufeler
2020–21	Yannick Schwaller	Michael Brunner	Romano Meier	Marcel Käufeler
2021–22	Yannick Schwaller	Michael Brunner	Romano Meier	Marcel Käufeler
2022–23	Michael Brunner	Romano Meier	Anthony Petoud	Marcel Käufeler
2023–24	Michael Brunner	Anthony Petoud	Romano Meier	Andreas Gerlach
2024–25	Michael Brunner	Anthony Petoud	Romano Meier	Andreas Gerlach
2025–26	Michael Brunner	Anthony Petoud	Romano Meier	Andreas Gerlach
