= Marcel Käufeler =

Swiss curler

- Curler
- Born: 19 January 1994 (age 32); Wettingen, Switzerland

Team
- Curling club: CC Baden Regio, Baden, SUI

Curling career
- Member Association: Switzerland
- World Championship: 1 (2022)
- European Championship: 1 (2019)
Medal record
Men's curling
Representing Switzerland
European Championships
Silver medal – second place	2019 Helsingborg

Marcel Käufeler (born 19 January 1994 in Wettingen, Switzerland) is a retired Swiss curler.

== Career ==
Käufeler joined the Yannick Schwaller rink at lead for the 2016–17 season. The team also included Romano Meier at third and Reto Keller at second. The team did not have very much success in their first season together and the teams second Reto Keller was replaced Käufeler's junior skip Michael Brunner for the 2017–18 season. Team Schwaller won their first tour event at the 2017 Qinghai International, losing only one game en route to claiming the title. They also reached the finals of both the DeKalb Superspiel and the Aberdeen International Curling Championship as well as the semifinals of the Oakville Fall Classic and the German Masters. The team also had a strong performance at the 2018 Swiss Men's Curling Championship, finishing the round robin in first place with a 9–1 record. They then won the 1 vs. 2 page playoff game to qualify for the final where they faced the Marc Pfister rink. After beating Team Pfister in both the round robin and page playoff game, they lost 7–5 in the championship final, settling for second.

Team Schwaller won two more tour events during the 2018–19 season, the Stu Sells Oakville Tankard and the Schweizer Cup. Because of their success from the previous season, the team joined the elite ranks and competed in their first ever Grand Slam of Curling events. They played in the 2018 Masters, 2018 National and the 2019 Champions Cup, however, missed the playoffs at all three events. The team also played in three legs of the Curling World Cup. In the second leg, they finished in seventh place with a 2–4 record. In the third leg, they finished in fourth with a 4–2 record and in the grand final, they went 3–3. At the Swiss Men's Championship, the team finished second in the round robin with a 6–1 record but was able to avenge that loss in the 1 vs. 2 page playoff game by defeating the de Cruz rink. In the final, they once again played Team de Cruz where they lost in an extra end 8–7. Also during the 2018–19 season, Käufeler and his team competed in the 2019 Winter Universiade. There, they went 6–3 through the round robin and won their qualification game before losing both the semifinal and bronze medal games, settling for fourth.

Käufeler and his team began the 2019–20 season by winning two more tour events, the Baden Masters and the 2019 Cameron's Brewing Oakville Fall Classic. Later in the fall, the team was selected to represent Switzerland at the 2019 European Curling Championships. There, they posted a 6–3 round robin record. This qualified them for the playoffs where they beat Denmark's Mikkel Krause in the semifinals, before losing to Sweden's Niklas Edin rink in the final, settling for silver. In Grand Slam play, the team competed in four events and reached the playoffs for the first time at the 2020 Canadian Open. There, they lost out to Brad Gushue in the quarterfinals. At the Swiss Championship, the team went 7–2 through the round robin and championship pools, qualifying them for the final against the de Cruz rink. There, they won their first national title by defeating Team de Cruz 5–3. The team was set to represent Switzerland at the 2020 World Men's Curling Championship before the event got cancelled due to the COVID-19 pandemic. The team won the last tour event of the season before it was cancelled due to the pandemic, the 2020 Aberdeen International Curling Championship.

To begin the abbreviated 2020–21 season, Team Schwaller finished runner-up at the 2020 Schweizer Cup, losing in the final to Andrin Schnider. They also lost in the finals of the Adelboden International and the 2.0 Cup, both to the de Cruz rink. They were then, however, able to win the 2020 Curling Masters Champéry, their only tour win of the season. At the Swiss Championship, the team could not defend their title, losing all three of their matches against the de Cruz rink, including the final. As they had won the Swiss Championship in 2020 but could not participate in the World Championship due to the cancellation, Team Schwaller played Team de Cruz in a best-of-five series to determine which team would represent Switzerland at the 2021 World Men's Curling Championship. After winning the first two games, Team de Cruz defeated Team Schwaller in the other three matches to win the series three games to two, earning themselves the spot at the World Championship. Käufeler and his team ended their season at the 2021 Champions Cup and 2021 Players' Championship Grand Slam events, which were played in a "curling bubble" in Calgary, Alberta, with no spectators, to avoid the spread of the coronavirus. The team failed to reach the playoffs at both events.

The Schwaller rink had a strong start to the 2021–22 season, winning both the 2021 Baden Masters and the 2021 Euro Super Series tour events. Next, Team Schwaller competed in the 2021 Swiss Olympic Curling Trials where they would face the de Cruz rink in a best-of-seven series to determine who would represent Switzerland at the 2022 Winter Olympics. Despite entering the Trials winning the first two events of the season, Team de Cruz won the first four matches of the event, securing their spot as the Olympic representatives. Back on tour, Team Schwaller reached the semifinals of four events, not able to reach the final in any of them. They played in both the 2021 Masters and 2021 National Slams but failed to reach the playoffs at both events. In the new year, they finished runner-up at the St. Galler Elite Challenge before entering the Swiss Championship. There, the team dominated the field, losing only one game en route to claiming their second Swiss Men's title. With the win, they went on to represent Switzerland at the 2022 World Men's Curling Championship. After having a strong start by winning five out of their first seven games, they finished the round robin in sixth place with a 6–6 record, narrowly qualifying for the playoffs. They then faced Italy's Joël Retornaz in the qualification game, where they lost 10–4 and were eliminated from contention. They ended their season at the 2022 Players' Championship where they lost all three of their games.

In April 2022, Schwaller announced that he would be leaving the Bern Zähringer team. The teams second Michael Brunner then took over as the teams skip, with Romano Meier playing third, Anthony Petoud joining at second and Käufeler at lead for the 2022–23 season.

In 2023, he announced his retirement from elite curling.

== Personal life ==
Käufeler is the owner of his company IMEK GmbH, which offers inkasso Services and consulting in the field of receivables management.{{}} He started curling in 2005 at the age of eleven.

== Grand Slam record ==
Key
C	Champion
F	Lost in Final
SF	Lost in Semifinal
QF	Lost in Quarterfinals
R16	Lost in the round of 16
Q	Did not advance to playoffs
T2	Played in Tier 2 event
DNP	Did not participate in event
N/A	Not a Grand Slam event that season

Event	2018–19	2019–20	2020–21	2021–22	2022–23
The National	Q	Q	N/A	Q	QF
Tour Challenge	DNP	Q	N/A	N/A	Q
Masters	Q	Q	N/A	Q	Q
Canadian Open	DNP	QF	N/A	N/A	DNP
Players'	DNP	N/A	Q	Q	DNP
Champions Cup	Q	N/A	Q	DNP	DNP

== Teams ==
Season	Skip	Third	Second	Lead
2011–12	Michael Brunner	Romano Meier	Remo Herzog	Marcel Käufeler
2012–13	Michael Brunner	Romano Meier	Remo Herzog	Marcel Käufeler
2013–14	Romano Meier (Fourth)	Michael Brunner (Skip)	Kyrill Oehninger	Marcel Käufeler
2014–15	Meico Öhninger	Michael Hauser	Kyrill Oehninger	Marcel Käufeler
2015–16	Meico Öhninger	Marc Wagenseil	Marcel Käufeler	Raymond Krenger
2016–17	Yannick Schwaller	Romano Meier	Reto Keller	Marcel Käufeler
2017–18	Yannick Schwaller	Romano Meier	Michael Brunner	Marcel Käufeler
2018–19	Yannick Schwaller	Michael Brunner	Romano Meier	Marcel Käufeler
2019–20	Yannick Schwaller	Michael Brunner	Romano Meier	Marcel Käufeler
2020–21	Yannick Schwaller	Michael Brunner	Romano Meier	Marcel Käufeler
2021–22	Yannick Schwaller	Michael Brunner	Romano Meier	Marcel Käufeler
2022–23	Michael Brunner	Romano Meier	Anthony Petoud	Marcel Käufeler
