= 2021 Euro Super Series =

- Host city: Stirling, Scotland
- Arena: National Curling Academy
- Dates: 31 August – 5 September
- Men's winner: (Switzerland) Team Schwaller
- Curling club: Curling Bern, Bern
- Skip: Yannick Schwaller
- Third: Michael Brunner
- Second: Romano Meier
- Lead: Marcel Käufeler
- Finalist: (Scotland) Ross Whyte
- Women's winner: (Scotland) GB Red
- Curling club: National Curling Academy, Stirling
- Skip: Rebecca Morrison
- Third: Lauren Gray
- Second: Jennifer Dodds
- Lead: Mili Smith
- Finalist: (Sweden) Isabella Wranå

The 2021 Euro Super Series was a curling event among various countries of Europe. It was held from 31 August to 5 September at the National Curling Academy in Stirling, Scotland. It was the first international competition hosted by the club, which serves as the home club for the top British curlers. The total purse for the event was £6,000 on both the men's and women's sides.

Team Yannick Schwaller of Bern, Switzerland won the men's event, defeating the Scottish rink of Ross Whyte from Stirling 5–4 in the final. In a tie game after six ends, Schwaller took a pivotal two points in the seventh, with Whyte only able to reply with one in the eighth and final end. It was Team Schwaller's second win of the 2021–22 curling season, as they had won the 2021 Baden Masters the week before. To reach the final, Schwaller went 4–1 through the round robin, only suffering a loss to Team Whyte. They then topped Bruce Mouat 8–2 in the quarterfinals and bested undefeated Joël Retornaz 5–4 in the semifinals. Whyte also finished 4–1 in the round robin, however, earned a direct berth to the semifinals thanks to their head-to-head victory against Schwaller. In their semifinal matchup, they defeated Peter de Cruz 7–5.

On the women's side of the draw, Team GB Red, consisting of Rebecca Morrison, Lauren Gray, Jennifer Dodds and Mili Smith defeated Team Isabella Wranå 7–2 in the final to claim the title. With the Olympics looming and Team Eve Muirhead not securing an Olympic spot at the 2021 World Women's Curling Championship, British Curling decided to create a nine-player team that would play in various lineups for the 2021–22 season before they selected who would represent Great Britain at the Olympic Qualification Event in December 2021. Both British teams showed promise, with the GB Blue team of Eve Muirhead, Gina Aitken, Vicky Wright, Sophie Sinclair and alternate Hailey Duff going 5–0 through the round robin before dropping their semifinal to Sweden's Wranå. GB Red finished the round robin with a 3–2 record, third in their pool. They beat the defending world champions Silvana Tirinzoni 6–3 in the quarterfinals and then defeated Daniela Jentsch 7–4 in the semifinals.

== Men ==
=== Teams ===
The teams are listed as follows:

Skip	Third	Second	Lead	Locale
Cameron Bryce	Callum Kinnear	Mark Taylor	Robin McCall	Stirling, Scotland
James Craik	Angus Bryce	Scott Hyslop	Niall Ryder	Stirling, Scotland
Benoît Schwarz (Fourth)	Sven Michel	Peter de Cruz (Skip)	Valentin Tanner	Geneva, Switzerland
Niklas Edin	Oskar Eriksson	Rasmus Wranå	Christoffer Sundgren	Karlstad, Sweden
Bruce Mouat	Grant Hardie	Bobby Lammie	Hammy McMillan Jr.	Stirling, Scotland
Joël Retornaz	Amos Mosaner	Sebastiano Arman	Simone Gonin	Pinerolo, Italy
Yannick Schwaller	Michael Brunner	Romano Meier	Marcel Käufeler	Bern, Switzerland
Sixten Totzek	Marc Muskatewitz	Joshua Sutor	Dominik Greindl	Munich, Germany
Wouter Gösgens (Fourth)	Jaap van Dorp (Skip)	Laurens Hoekman	Carlo Glasbergen	Zoetermeer, Netherlands
Ross Paterson (Fourth)	Kyle Waddell (Skip)	Duncan Menzies	Craig Waddell	Glasgow, Scotland
Mark Watt	Gregor Cannon	Blair Haswell	Gavin Barr	Stirling, Scotland
Ross Whyte	Robin Brydone	Duncan McFadzean	Euan Kyle	Stirling, Scotland

=== Round-robin standings ===
Final round-robin standings

Key
Teams to Playoffs

Pool A	W	L	PF	PA
(Italy) Joël Retornaz	5	0	33	20
(Switzerland) Peter de Cruz	4	1	35	21
(Scotland) Bruce Mouat	3	2	30	25
(Scotland) Team Paterson	2	3	22	27
(Scotland) Mark Watt	1	4	24	33
(Scotland) Cameron Bryce	0	5	14	32

Pool B	W	L	PF	PA
(Scotland) Ross Whyte	4	1	27	20
(Switzerland) Yannick Schwaller	4	1	29	13
(Sweden) Niklas Edin	3	2	24	22
(Scotland) James Craik	3	2	24	27
(Netherlands) Jaap van Dorp	1	4	23	31
(Germany) Sixten Totzek	0	5	16	30

=== Round-robin results ===
All draw times are listed in British Summer Time (UTC+01:00).

==== Draw 1 ====
Tuesday, 31 August, 8:30 am

Sheet A	1	2	3	4	5	6	7	8	9	Final
(Scotland) Mark Watt	2	0	2	0	0	1	0	1	0	6
(Switzerland) Peter de Cruz	0	2	0	0	1	0	3	0	1	7

Sheet B	1	2	3	4	5	6	7	8	Final
(Scotland) Cameron Bryce	0	0	0	1	0	1	0	X	2
(Scotland) Team Paterson	0	1	0	0	2	0	1	X	4

==== Draw 2 ====
Tuesday, 31 August, 12:30 pm

Sheet A	1	2	3	4	5	6	7	8	Final
(Scotland) James Craik	0	1	1	0	0	1	0	X	3
(Sweden) Niklas Edin	2	0	0	3	0	0	1	X	6

Sheet B	1	2	3	4	5	6	7	8	Final
(Germany) Sixten Totzek	0	1	0	1	0	0	X	X	2
(Scotland) Ross Whyte	2	0	2	0	2	1	X	X	7

==== Draw 3 ====
Tuesday, 31 August, 4:30 pm

Sheet A	1	2	3	4	5	6	7	8	9	Final
(Scotland) Bruce Mouat	3	0	1	0	0	2	0	1	0	7
(Italy) Joël Retornaz	0	2	0	1	2	0	2	0	1	8

Sheet C	1	2	3	4	5	6	7	8	Final
(Scotland) Team Paterson	2	0	2	0	0	2	0	X	6
(Scotland) Mark Watt	0	2	0	2	0	0	1	X	5

==== Draw 4 ====
Tuesday, 31 August, 8:30 pm

Sheet A	1	2	3	4	5	6	7	8	Final
(Switzerland) Yannick Schwaller	0	2	1	0	2	1	X	X	6
(Netherlands) Jaap van Dorp	1	0	0	0	0	0	X	X	1

Sheet C	1	2	3	4	5	6	7	8	Final
(Scotland) Ross Whyte	0	0	0	0	0	2	0	2	4
(Scotland) James Craik	1	0	0	2	1	0	1	0	5

==== Draw 5 ====
Wednesday, 1 September, 8:30 am

Sheet B	1	2	3	4	5	6	7	8	Final
(Scotland) Bruce Mouat	0	0	0	0	4	0	2	1	7
(Scotland) Mark Watt	0	1	1	1	0	1	0	0	4

Sheet D	1	2	3	4	5	6	7	8	9	Final
(Italy) Joël Retornaz	0	0	1	0	1	1	0	2	1	6
(Scotland) Team Paterson	2	1	0	1	0	0	1	0	0	5

==== Draw 6 ====
Wednesday, 1 September, 12:30 pm

Sheet B	1	2	3	4	5	6	7	8	Final
(Switzerland) Yannick Schwaller	0	3	1	1	0	2	X	X	7
(Scotland) James Craik	0	0	0	0	2	0	X	X	2

Sheet D	1	2	3	4	5	6	7	8	9	Final
(Netherlands) Jaap van Dorp	1	0	2	0	1	2	0	1	0	7
(Scotland) Ross Whyte	0	2	0	4	0	0	1	0	1	8

==== Draw 7 ====
Wednesday, 1 September, 4:30 pm

Sheet C	1	2	3	4	5	6	7	8	Final
(Switzerland) Peter de Cruz	5	0	2	0	4	X	X	X	11
(Scotland) Cameron Bryce	0	1	0	1	0	X	X	X	2

==== Draw 8 ====
Wednesday, 1 September, 8:30 pm

Sheet C	1	2	3	4	5	6	7	8	Final
(Sweden) Niklas Edin	1	0	2	0	2	1	0	X	6
(Germany) Sixten Totzek	0	1	0	1	0	0	1	X	3

==== Draw 9 ====
Thursday, 2 September, 8:30 am

Sheet B	1	2	3	4	5	6	7	8	Final
(Italy) Joël Retornaz	0	0	2	0	2	0	2	X	6
(Switzerland) Peter de Cruz	0	2	0	1	0	1	0	X	4

Sheet D	1	2	3	4	5	6	7	8	Final
(Scotland) Cameron Bryce	0	0	1	0	0	1	0	0	2
(Scotland) Bruce Mouat	0	1	0	1	1	0	0	1	4

==== Draw 10 ====
Thursday, 2 September, 12:30 pm

Sheet B	1	2	3	4	5	6	7	8	Final
(Netherlands) Jaap van Dorp	0	0	2	0	1	0	1	1	5
(Sweden) Niklas Edin	0	3	0	2	0	1	0	0	6

Sheet D	1	2	3	4	5	6	7	8	Final
(Germany) Sixten Totzek	0	0	1	0	0	2	0	0	3
(Switzerland) Yannick Schwaller	0	1	0	1	2	0	1	1	6

==== Draw 11 ====
Thursday, 2 September, 4:30 pm

Sheet B	1	2	3	4	5	6	7	8	Final
(Scotland) Team Paterson	0	0	1	0	2	0	2	X	5
(Scotland) Bruce Mouat	1	1	0	4	0	1	0	X	7

Sheet D	1	2	3	4	5	6	7	8	Final
(Scotland) Mark Watt	0	0	0	1	0	0	X	X	1
(Italy) Joël Retornaz	2	0	1	0	1	4	X	X	8

==== Draw 12 ====
Thursday, 2 September, 8:30 pm

Sheet B	1	2	3	4	5	6	7	8	9	Final
(Scotland) Ross Whyte	0	0	0	1	0	1	1	0	1	4
(Switzerland) Yannick Schwaller	1	0	0	0	1	0	0	1	0	3

Sheet D	1	2	3	4	5	6	7	8	Final
(Scotland) James Craik	0	0	2	0	2	0	4	X	8
(Netherlands) Jaap van Dorp	1	2	0	1	0	1	0	X	5

==== Draw 13 ====
Friday, 3 September, 8:30 am

Sheet A	1	2	3	4	5	6	7	8	Final
(Switzerland) Peter de Cruz	2	0	1	0	1	3	X	X	7
(Scotland) Team Paterson	0	1	0	1	0	0	X	X	2

Sheet B	1	2	3	4	5	6	7	8	Final
(Scotland) Mark Watt	3	0	2	0	0	2	0	1	8
(Scotland) Cameron Bryce	0	2	0	0	1	0	2	0	5

==== Draw 14 ====
Friday, 3 September, 12:30 pm

Sheet A	1	2	3	4	5	6	7	8	Final
(Sweden) Niklas Edin	0	0	0	1	1	0	1	0	3
(Scotland) Ross Whyte	0	0	1	0	0	1	0	2	4

Sheet B	1	2	3	4	5	6	7	8	Final
(Scotland) James Craik	2	0	0	2	0	0	2	0	6
(Germany) Sixten Totzek	0	0	1	0	1	1	0	2	5

==== Draw 15 ====
Friday, 3 September, 4:30 pm

Sheet A	1	2	3	4	5	6	7	8	Final
(Italy) Joël Retornaz	0	1	0	0	2	2	X	X	5
(Scotland) Cameron Bryce	0	0	2	1	0	0	X	X	3

Sheet C	1	2	3	4	5	6	7	8	Final
(Scotland) Bruce Mouat	0	2	0	1	0	1	1	0	5
(Switzerland) Peter de Cruz	3	0	1	0	1	0	0	1	6

==== Draw 16 ====
Friday, 3 September, 8:30 pm

Sheet A	1	2	3	4	5	6	7	8	Final
(Netherlands) Jaap van Dorp	2	0	1	0	0	1	0	1	5
(Germany) Sixten Totzek	0	2	0	1	0	0	0	0	3

Sheet C	1	2	3	4	5	6	7	8	Final
(Switzerland) Yannick Schwaller	4	0	3	X	X	X	X	X	7
(Sweden) Niklas Edin	0	3	0	X	X	X	X	X	3

=== Playoffs ===
Quarterfinals
B2	(Switzerland) Yannick Schwaller	8
A3	(Scotland) Bruce Mouat	2
A2	(Switzerland) Peter de Cruz	4
B3	(Sweden) Niklas Edin	2

Semifinals
A1	(Italy) Joël Retornaz	4
B2	(Switzerland) Yannick Schwaller	5
B1	(Scotland) Ross Whyte	7
A2	(Switzerland) Peter de Cruz	5

Final
B2	(Switzerland) Yannick Schwaller	5
B1	(Scotland) Ross Whyte	4

==== Quarterfinals ====
Saturday, 4 September 9:00 am

Sheet B	1	2	3	4	5	6	7	8	Final
(Switzerland) Peter de Cruz	0	1	0	1	0	1	1	0	4
(Sweden) Niklas Edin	0	0	0	0	1	0	0	1	2

Sheet D	1	2	3	4	5	6	7	8	Final
(Switzerland) Yannick Schwaller	2	2	0	3	1	X	X	X	8
(Scotland) Bruce Mouat	0	0	2	0	0	X	X	X	2

==== Semifinals ====
Saturday, 4 September, 1:30 pm

Sheet C	1	2	3	4	5	6	7	8	Final
(Italy) Joël Retornaz	0	1	0	0	0	3	0	0	4
(Switzerland) Yannick Schwaller	1	0	0	1	1	0	0	2	5

Sheet D	1	2	3	4	5	6	7	8	Final
(Scotland) Ross Whyte	3	1	0	3	0	0	0	X	7
(Switzerland) Peter de Cruz	0	0	2	0	2	1	0	X	5

==== Final ====
Sunday, 5 September, 9:00 am

Sheet A	1	2	3	4	5	6	7	8	Final
(Switzerland) Yannick Schwaller	0	1	0	0	2	0	2	0	5
(Scotland) Ross Whyte	0	0	0	2	0	1	0	1	4

== Women ==
=== Teams ===
The teams are listed as follows:

Skip	Third	Second	Lead	Alternate	Locale
Beth Farmer	Sophie Jackson	Kirstin Bousie	Emma Barr		Kinross, Scotland
Anna Hasselborg	Sara McManus	Agnes Knochenhauer	Sofia Mabergs		Sundbyberg, Sweden
Fay Henderson	Katie McMillan	Lisa Davie	Holly Wilkie-Milne		Stirling, Scotland
Daniela Jentsch	Mia Höhne	Emira Abbes	Analena Jentsch		Füssen, Germany
Selina Witschonke (Fourth)	Elena Mathis	Raphaela Keiser (Skip)	Marina Lörtscher		St. Moritz, Switzerland
Amy MacDonald	Susie Smith	Eilidh Yeats	Nicola Joiner		Stirling, Scotland
Rebecca Morrison (Note: As part of the nine-player national squad, Teams Gina Aitken and Eve Muirhead formed two new teams named GB Red and GB Blue. Rebecca Morrison skipped GB Red and Eve Muirhead skipped GB Blue.)	Lauren Gray	Jennifer Dodds	Mili Smith		Stirling, Scotland
Eve Muirhead	Gina Aitken	Vicky Wright	Sophie Sinclair	Hailey Duff	Stirling, Scotland
Robyn Munro	Robyn Mitchell	Beth Rowley	Laura Watt		Stranraer, Scotland
Irene Schori	Lara Stocker	Stefanie Berset	– (Note: Team Irene Schori only played with three players as third Carole Howald had a foot injury.)		Langenthal, Switzerland
Alina Pätz (Fourth)	Silvana Tirinzoni (Skip)	Esther Neuenschwander	Melanie Barbezat		Aarau, Switzerland
Isabella Wranå	Almida de Val	Jennie Wåhlin	Maria Larsson		Sundbyberg, Sweden

=== Round-robin standings ===
Final round-robin standings

Key
Teams to Playoffs

Pool A	W	L	PF	PA
(Germany) Daniela Jentsch	3	2	28	30
(Sweden) Anna Hasselborg	3	2	32	24
(Scotland) GB Red	3	2	29	24
(Switzerland) Raphaela Keiser	2	3	31	21
(Scotland) Amy MacDonald	2	3	27	36
(Switzerland) Irene Schori	2	3	22	34

Pool B	W	L	PF	PA
(Scotland) GB Blue	5	0	42	16
(Switzerland) Silvana Tirinzoni	4	1	33	18
(Sweden) Isabella Wranå	3	2	40	18
(Scotland) Fay Henderson	2	3	19	30
(Scotland) Beth Farmer	1	4	18	38
(Scotland) Robyn Munro	0	5	13	45

=== Round-robin results ===
All draw times are listed in British Summer Time (UTC+01:00).

==== Draw 1 ====
Tuesday, 31 August, 8:30 am

Sheet C	1	2	3	4	5	6	7	8	Final
(Switzerland) Raphaela Keiser	0	0	2	0	0	1	1	0	4
(Germany) Daniela Jentsch	1	0	0	0	3	0	0	1	5

Sheet D	1	2	3	4	5	6	7	8	Final
(Scotland) GB Red	3	0	2	2	0	0	1	X	8
(Scotland) Amy MacDonald	0	1	0	0	0	2	0	X	3

==== Draw 2 ====
Tuesday, 31 August, 12:30 pm

Sheet C	1	2	3	4	5	6	7	8	Final
(Scotland) Beth Farmer	0	1	0	0	X	X	X	X	1
(Scotland) GB Blue	3	0	4	4	X	X	X	X	11

Sheet D	1	2	3	4	5	6	7	8	Final
(Sweden) Isabella Wranå	0	2	2	2	1	0	1	X	8
(Scotland) Fay Henderson	0	0	0	0	0	3	0	X	3

==== Draw 3 ====
Tuesday, 31 August, 4:30 pm

Sheet B	1	2	3	4	5	6	7	8	Final
(Scotland) Amy MacDonald	2	0	3	0	0	3	2	X	10
(Germany) Daniela Jentsch	0	2	0	1	1	0	0	X	4

Sheet D	1	2	3	4	5	6	7	8	Final
(Switzerland) Irene Schori	0	1	0	2	0	1	0	1	5
(Sweden) Anna Hasselborg	1	0	1	0	1	0	1	0	4

==== Draw 4 ====
Tuesday, 31 August, 8:30 pm

Sheet B	1	2	3	4	5	6	7	8	Final
(Scotland) Fay Henderson	1	0	0	1	0	1	X	X	3
(Scotland) GB Blue	0	5	1	0	2	0	X	X	8

Sheet D	1	2	3	4	5	6	7	8	Final
(Scotland) Robyn Munro	0	0	1	0	1	0	X	X	2
(Switzerland) Silvana Tirinzoni	3	1	0	1	0	5	X	X	10

==== Draw 5 ====
Wednesday, 1 September, 8:30 am

Sheet A	1	2	3	4	5	6	7	8	Final
(Germany) Daniela Jentsch	1	2	0	1	0	0	1	0	5
(Switzerland) Irene Schori	0	0	0	0	3	2	0	1	6

==== Draw 6 ====
Wednesday, 1 September, 12:30 pm

Sheet A	1	2	3	4	5	6	7	8	Final
(Scotland) GB Blue	2	2	1	0	3	X	X	X	8
(Scotland) Robyn Munro	0	0	0	1	0	X	X	X	1

Sheet C	1	2	3	4	5	6	7	8	Final
(Switzerland) Silvana Tirinzoni	1	0	0	1	0	4	X	X	6
(Scotland) Fay Henderson	0	0	0	0	1	0	X	X	1

==== Draw 7 ====
Wednesday, 1 September, 4:30 pm

Sheet B	1	2	3	4	5	6	7	8	9	Final
(Switzerland) Raphaela Keiser	0	0	1	0	1	0	1	1	0	4
(Scotland) GB Red	0	1	0	3	0	0	0	0	1	5

Sheet D	1	2	3	4	5	6	7	8	Final
(Sweden) Anna Hasselborg	2	1	0	0	3	0	4	X	10
(Scotland) Amy MacDonald	0	0	0	2	0	1	0	X	3

==== Draw 8 ====
Wednesday, 1 September, 8:30 pm

Sheet B	1	2	3	4	5	6	7	8	Final
(Scotland) Beth Farmer	0	2	0	0	1	0	0	X	3
(Sweden) Isabella Wranå	2	0	0	4	0	2	3	X	11

==== Draw 9 ====
Thursday, 2 September, 8:30 am

Sheet A	1	2	3	4	5	6	7	8	9	Final
(Sweden) Anna Hasselborg	0	0	0	1	1	1	0	1	1	5
(Switzerland) Raphaela Keiser	1	1	1	0	0	0	1	0	0	4

Sheet C	1	2	3	4	5	6	7	8	Final
(Scotland) GB Red	1	2	0	1	3	0	X	X	7
(Switzerland) Irene Schori	0	0	2	0	0	1	X	X	3

==== Draw 10 ====
Thursday, 2 September, 12:30 pm

Sheet A	1	2	3	4	5	6	7	8	Final
(Switzerland) Silvana Tirinzoni	1	1	1	0	2	0	0	X	5
(Scotland) Beth Farmer	0	0	0	1	0	2	0	X	3

Sheet C	1	2	3	4	5	6	7	8	Final
(Sweden) Isabella Wranå	3	4	1	5	X	X	X	X	13
(Scotland) Robyn Munro	0	0	0	0	X	X	X	X	0

==== Draw 11 ====
Thursday, 2 September, 4:30 pm

Sheet A	1	2	3	4	5	6	7	8	Final
(Switzerland) Irene Schori	0	2	0	1	0	0	2	0	5
(Scotland) Amy MacDonald	3	0	0	0	1	1	0	3	8

Sheet C	1	2	3	4	5	6	7	8	Final
(Germany) Daniela Jentsch	2	0	2	1	0	1	0	1	7
(Sweden) Anna Hasselborg	0	2	0	0	4	0	0	0	6

==== Draw 12 ====
Thursday, 2 September, 8:30 pm

Sheet A	1	2	3	4	5	6	7	8	Final
(Scotland) Robyn Munro	0	0	0	0	1	2	1	X	4
(Scotland) Fay Henderson	0	1	5	1	0	0	0	X	7

Sheet C	1	2	3	4	5	6	7	8	9	Final
(Scotland) GB Blue	5	0	1	0	0	0	1	0	1	8
(Switzerland) Silvana Tirinzoni	0	1	0	1	1	1	0	3	0	7

==== Draw 13 ====
Friday, 3 September, 8:30 am

Sheet C	1	2	3	4	5	6	7	8	Final
(Scotland) Amy MacDonald	0	1	0	1	0	0	1	X	3
(Switzerland) Raphaela Keiser	3	0	2	0	3	1	0	X	9

Sheet D	1	2	3	4	5	6	7	8	Final
(Germany) Daniela Jentsch	1	3	0	2	0	0	1	X	7
(Scotland) GB Red	0	0	2	0	1	1	0	X	4

==== Draw 14 ====
Friday, 3 September, 12:30 pm

Sheet C	1	2	3	4	5	6	7	8	Final
(Scotland) Fay Henderson	0	0	1	0	1	0	2	1	5
(Scotland) Beth Farmer	0	0	0	3	0	1	0	0	4

Sheet D	1	2	3	4	5	6	7	8	Final
(Scotland) GB Blue	4	0	2	1	0	0	0	X	7
(Sweden) Isabella Wranå	0	1	0	0	1	1	1	X	4

==== Draw 15 ====
Friday, 3 September, 4:30 pm

Sheet B	1	2	3	4	5	6	7	8	Final
(Scotland) GB Red	0	1	0	0	2	0	2	0	5
(Sweden) Anna Hasselborg	1	0	0	4	0	1	0	1	7

Sheet D	1	2	3	4	5	6	7	8	Final
(Switzerland) Raphaela Keiser	1	0	2	1	2	4	X	X	10
(Switzerland) Irene Schori	0	3	0	0	0	0	X	X	3

==== Draw 16 ====
Friday, 3 September, 8:30 pm

Sheet B	1	2	3	4	5	6	7	8	Final
(Sweden) Isabella Wranå	0	1	0	0	1	0	2	0	4
(Switzerland) Silvana Tirinzoni	0	0	1	1	0	1	0	2	5

Sheet D	1	2	3	4	5	6	7	8	Final
(Scotland) Beth Farmer	0	1	0	3	0	3	0	0	7
(Scotland) Robyn Munro	2	0	1	0	1	0	1	1	6

=== Playoffs ===
Quarterfinals
B2	(Switzerland) Silvana Tirinzoni	3
A3	(Scotland) GB Red	6
A2	(Sweden) Anna Hasselborg	3
B3	(Sweden) Isabella Wranå	4

Semifinals
A1	(Germany) Daniela Jentsch	4
A3	(Scotland) GB Red	7
B1	(Scotland) GB Blue	5
B3	(Sweden) Isabella Wranå	6

Final
A3	(Scotland) GB Red	7
B3	(Sweden) Isabella Wranå	2

==== Quarterfinals ====
Saturday, 4 September, 9:00 am

Sheet A	1	2	3	4	5	6	7	8	Final
(Switzerland) Silvana Tirinzoni	1	0	0	1	0	0	1	X	3
(Scotland) GB Red	0	2	0	0	3	1	0	X	6

Sheet C	1	2	3	4	5	6	7	8	Final
(Sweden) Anna Hasselborg	0	2	0	0	0	1	0	0	3
(Sweden) Isabella Wranå	0	0	0	0	3	0	0	1	4

==== Semifinals ====
Saturday, 4 September, 5:30 pm

Sheet B	1	2	3	4	5	6	7	8	Final
(Germany) Daniela Jentsch	0	1	0	0	2	0	1	0	4
(Scotland) GB Red	2	0	1	1	0	1	0	2	7

Sheet D	1	2	3	4	5	6	7	8	Final
(Scotland) GB Blue	0	1	0	2	1	1	0	0	5
(Sweden) Isabella Wranå	1	0	2	0	0	0	2	1	6

==== Final ====
Sunday, 5 September, 9:00 am

Sheet B	1	2	3	4	5	6	7	8	Final
(Scotland) GB Red	0	3	0	1	2	0	1	X	7
(Sweden) Isabella Wranå	0	0	1	0	0	1	0	X	2
