= 2021 Swiss Olympic curling trials =

2021 Swiss Olympic Curling Trials
- Host city: Biel, Switzerland
- Arena: Curlinghalle AG Biel
- Dates: September 22–25
- Winner: (Canton of Geneva) Team de Cruz
- Curling club: CC Genève, Geneva
- Skip: Peter de Cruz
- Fourth: Benoît Schwarz
- Third: Sven Michel
- Lead: Valentin Tanner
- Coach: Håvard Vad Petersson
- Finalist: (Canton of Bern) Yannick Schwaller

The 2021 Swiss Olympic Curling Trials were held from September 22 to 25 at the Curlinghalle AG Biel in Biel, Switzerland. The winning Peter de Cruz team earned the right to represent Switzerland at the 2022 Winter Olympics in Beijing, China. There was only a men's event, as the Silvana Tirinzoni rink had already been chosen to represent Switzerland in the women's event.

The event was held in a best-of-seven series between the 2020 and 2021 Swiss champion rinks, Yannick Schwaller (Bern) and Peter de Cruz (Geneva) respectively. Coming into the event, both teams played in two events, the 2021 Baden Masters and the 2021 Euro Super Series, with Schwaller winning both events. Schwaller also defeated de Cruz in the final of the Baden Masters. de Cruz was looking to return to the Olympics, as they won the bronze medal at the 2018 Winter Olympics in PyeongChang, South Korea. Switzerland secured an Olympic Spot in the men's event by finishing in third at the 2021 World Men's Curling Championship, courtesy of Team de Cruz. Had they made it to the gold medal game, they would have automatically been named as the Olympic Team. All games were broadcast on Swiss Curling's YouTube Channel.

== Summary ==
Team de Cruz swept the event, winning all four games played to claim the title. The first game, held Wednesday, September 22 at 6:00 pm, was a back-and-forth game, with teams trading singles until the ninth where Schwaller scored two to take the 4–3 lead. de Cruz then took two in the tenth end to win 5–4. Games 2 and 3 were held Thursday, September 23 at 10:00 am and 6:00 pm. de Cruz dominated Game 2, winning 9–2 in only six ends. Game 3 was a closer draw, with singles and deuces being traded throughout the game. de Cruz then took two in the extra end for the 8–6 win. Draw 4 was held Friday, September 24 at 10:00 am. Again, only singles and deuces were scored during the game, with Schwaller taking two once again in the ninth end to lead by one. de Cruz then, again, took two in the tenth to win 8–7 and claim the Olympic Berth.

== Teams ==
The teams are listed as follows:

| Skip | Third | Second | Lead | Alternate | Locale |
|---|---|---|---|---|---|
| Benoît Schwarz (Fourth) | Sven Michel | Peter de Cruz (Skip) | Valentin Tanner | | (Canton of Geneva) Geneva |
| Yannick Schwaller | Michael Brunner | Romano Meier | Marcel Käufeler | Martin Rios | (Canton of Bern) Bern |

== Standings ==
| Best-of-seven |
| 1 | (Canton of Bern) Yannick Schwaller | 4 | 2 | 6 | 7 | X | X | X |
| 2 | (Canton of Geneva) Peter de Cruz | 5 | 9 | 8 | 8 | X | X | X |

== Results ==
All draw times are listed in Central European Summer Time (UTC+02:00).

=== Draw 1 ===
Wednesday, September 22, 6:00 pm

| Sheet 4 | 1 | 2 | 3 | 4 | 5 | 6 | 7 | 8 | 9 | 10 | Final |
|---|---|---|---|---|---|---|---|---|---|---|---|
| (Canton of Bern) Yannick Schwaller | 0 | 1 | 0 | 1 | 0 | 0 | 0 | 0 | 2 | 0 | 4 |
| (Canton of Geneva) Peter de Cruz 🔨 | 1 | 0 | 0 | 0 | 0 | 1 | 1 | 0 | 0 | 2 | 5 |

=== Draw 2 ===
Thursday, September 23, 10:00 am

| Sheet 3 | 1 | 2 | 3 | 4 | 5 | 6 | 7 | 8 | 9 | 10 | Final |
|---|---|---|---|---|---|---|---|---|---|---|---|
| (Canton of Geneva) Peter de Cruz | 0 | 3 | 2 | 0 | 3 | 1 | X | X | X | X | 9 |
| (Canton of Bern) Yannick Schwaller 🔨 | 1 | 0 | 0 | 1 | 0 | 0 | X | X | X | X | 2 |

=== Draw 3 ===
Thursday, September 23, 6:00 pm

| Sheet 4 | 1 | 2 | 3 | 4 | 5 | 6 | 7 | 8 | 9 | 10 | 11 | Final |
|---|---|---|---|---|---|---|---|---|---|---|---|---|
| (Canton of Bern) Yannick Schwaller | 0 | 2 | 0 | 0 | 2 | 0 | 1 | 0 | 0 | 1 | 0 | 6 |
| (Canton of Geneva) Peter de Cruz 🔨 | 1 | 0 | 0 | 2 | 0 | 1 | 0 | 2 | 0 | 0 | 2 | 8 |

=== Draw 4 ===
Friday, September 24, 10:00 am

| Sheet 3 | 1 | 2 | 3 | 4 | 5 | 6 | 7 | 8 | 9 | 10 | Final |
|---|---|---|---|---|---|---|---|---|---|---|---|
| (Canton of Geneva) Peter de Cruz 🔨 | 2 | 0 | 0 | 1 | 0 | 2 | 0 | 1 | 0 | 2 | 8 |
| (Canton of Bern) Yannick Schwaller | 0 | 2 | 0 | 0 | 2 | 0 | 1 | 0 | 2 | 0 | 7 |
