= Adelboden International =

World Curling Tour event

- Established: 2020
- Host city: Adelboden, Switzerland
- Arena: Arena Freizeit Und Sport Adelboden
- Purse: CHF 4,200
- 2022 champion: (Italy) Joël Retornaz

The Adelboden International is an annual bonspiel, or curling tournament, held at the Arena Freizeit Und Sport Adelboden in Adelboden, Switzerland. It was established in 2020 and is held as part of the World Curling Tour. The event is held in a round robin format with eight teams qualifying for the playoffs.

Despite being part of the men's tour, two women's teams have competed in the event. Team Silvana Tirinzoni competed in 2020 and Team Corrie Hürlimann competed in 2021.

== Past champions ==
Year	Winning team	Runner-up team	Purse (CHF)
2020	(Switzerland) Benoît Schwarz (Fourth), Sven Michel, Peter de Cruz (Skip), Valentin Tanner	(Switzerland) Yannick Schwaller, Michael Brunner, Romano Meier, Marcel Käufeler	4,200
2021	(Switzerland) Marco Hösli, Philipp Hösli, Marco Hefti, Justin Hausherr	(Switzerland) Marc Pfister (Fourth), Tim Jungen, Björn Jungen (Skip), Simon Gempeler, Enrico Pfister	4,200
2022	(Italy) Joël Retornaz, Amos Mosaner, Sebastiano Arman, Mattia Giovanella	(Switzerland) Andrin Schnider, Nicola Stoll, Noé Traub, Tom Winklehausen	4,200
2023	Cancelled		
