= Yannick Schwaller =

Swiss curler (born 1995)

- Curler
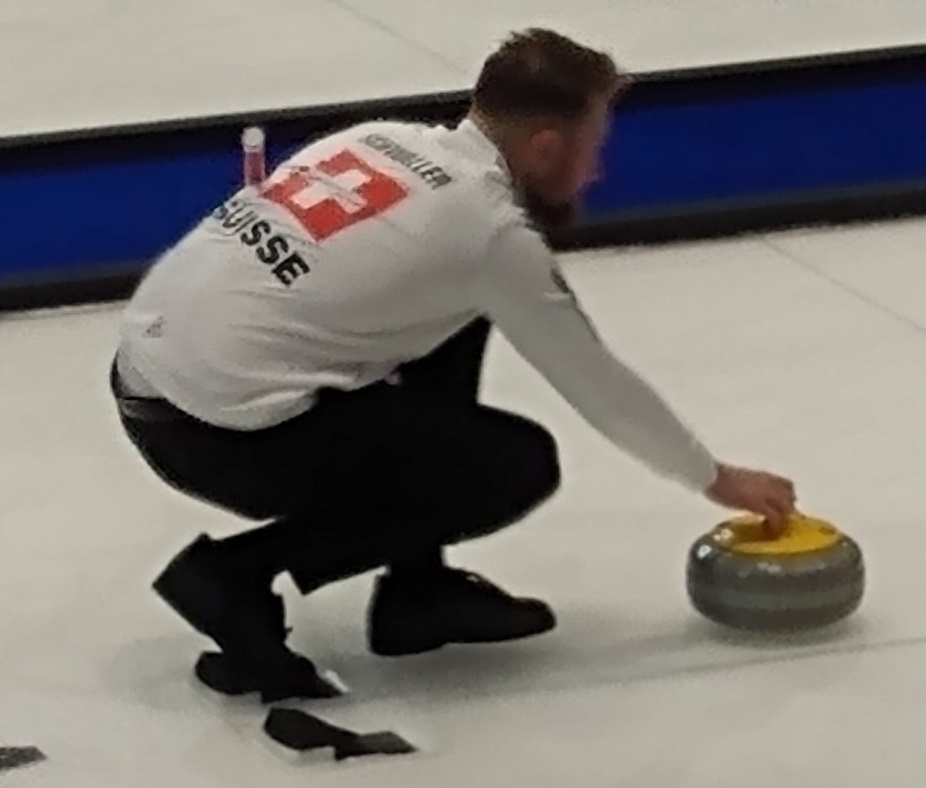
- Born: 31 March 1995 (age 31); Recherswil, Switzerland

Team
- Curling club: CC3C Genève, Genève, SUI
- Skip: Yannick Schwaller
- Fourth: Benoît Schwarz-van Berkel
- Second: Sven Michel
- Lead: Pablo Lachat-Couchepin
- Alternate: Kim Schwaller
- Mixed doubles partner: Briar Schwaller-Hürlimann

Curling career
- Member Association: Switzerland
- World Championship: 4 (2022, 2023, 2024, 2025)
- World Mixed Doubles Championship: 2 (2023, 2024)
- European Championship: 5 (2019, 2022, 2023, 2024, 2025)
- Olympic: 1 (2026)
- Grand Slam victories: 2 (2025 Canadian Open, 2026 Invitational)
Medal record
Men's curling
Representing Switzerland
Olympic Games
| Bronze medal – third place | 2026 Milano Cortina | Team |
World Championships
| Silver medal – second place | 2025 Moose Jaw |
| Bronze medal – third place | 2023 Ottawa |
European Championships
| Silver medal – second place | 2019 Helsingborg |
| Silver medal – second place | 2022 Östersund |
| Silver medal – second place | 2025 Lohja |
| Bronze medal – third place | 2023 Aberdeen |
World Junior Championships
| Gold medal – first place | 2014 Flims |
| Silver medal – second place | 2015 Tallinn |

Yannick Schwaller (born 31 March 1995) is a Swiss curler from Recherswil. He currently skips his own team out of Geneva. He is the 2026 Winter Olympics bronze medalist, two-time World Championship medalist and four-time European Championship medalist.

== Career ==
=== Juniors ===
Schwaller skipped the Swiss junior men's team at three straight World Junior Curling Championships. In 2014, he led his team of Reto Keller, throwing fourth stones, Patrick Witschonke, Michael Probst and Romano Meier to a 6–3 round robin record. They then beat Italy's Amos Mosaner in a tiebreaker to qualify for the playoffs. There, they defeated Canada's Braden Calvert and Norway's Eirik Mjøen in the 3 vs. 4 page playoff and semifinal games, respectively, qualifying for the final. In the final, they won 6–5 over Scotland's Kyle Smith rink to become the World Junior champions, becoming just the fifth Swiss men's team to do so.

Schwaller returned to the World Juniors the following season with the same lineup in an attempt to repeat as world champions. The team fared better through the round robin at the 2015 World Junior Curling Championships, finishing second overall with a 7–2 record. They then lost to Canada's Calvert team in the 1 vs. 2 game, but bounced back with a win over Sweden's Fredrik Nyman, allowing them to once again play in the World Junior final. There, they were defeated 6–3 by the Canadian team, settling for silver.

Team Schwaller began competing on the World Curling Tour during the 2015–16 season and found success, reaching the playoffs in four of their events. They made the semifinal round of the Curling Masters Champéry and the quarterfinals of the Swiss Cup Basel, as well as the finals of two regional Swiss events. His team, now with Schwaller throwing the fourth stones, competed once more in the 2016 World Junior Curling Championships where they made the playoffs for a third straight year with a 6–3 record. Despite beating Canada's Matt Dunstone in the 3 vs. 4 page playoff game, they lost both the semifinal and bronze medal game to the United States' Korey Dropkin and Canada respectively, settling for fourth.

=== Men's ===
Out of juniors, Schwaller continued competing on the World Curling Tour skipping his team of Meier, Keller and Marcel Käufeler. They did not have very much success in their first season together, and Reto Keller was replaced by Michael Brunner for the 2017–18 season. They won their first tour event at the 2017 Qinghai International, losing only one game en route to claiming the title. They also reached the finals of both the DeKalb Superspiel and the Aberdeen International Curling Championship as well as the semifinals of the Oakville Fall Classic and the German Masters. The team also had a strong performance at the 2018 Swiss Men's Curling Championship, finishing the round robin in first place with a 9–1 record. They then won the 1 vs. 2 page playoff game to qualify for the final, where they faced the Marc Pfister rink. After beating Team Pfister in both the round robin and page playoff game, they lost 7–5 in the championship final, settling for second.

Team Schwaller won two more tour events during the 2018–19 season, the Stu Sells Oakville Tankard and the Schweizer Cup. Because of their success from the previous season, the team joined the elite ranks and competed in their first ever Grand Slam of Curling events. They played in the 2018 Masters, 2018 National, and the 2019 Champions Cup; however, they missed the playoffs at all three events. The team also played in three legs of the Curling World Cup. In the second leg, they finished in seventh place with a 2–4 record. In the third leg, they finished in fourth with a 4–2 record and in the grand final, they went 3–3. At the Swiss Men's Championship, the team finished second in the round robin with a 6–1 record but avenged that loss in the 1 vs. 2 page playoff game by defeating the Peter de Cruz rink. In the final, they once again played Team de Cruz where they lost in an extra end 8–7. Also during the 2018–19 season, Schwaller and his team competed in the 2019 Winter Universiade. There, they went 6–3 through the round robin and won their qualification game before losing both the semifinal and bronze medal games, settling for fourth.

Schwaller and his team began the 2019–20 season by winning two more tour events, the Baden Masters and the 2019 Cameron's Brewing Oakville Fall Classic. Later in the fall, the team was selected to represent Switzerland at the 2019 European Curling Championships. There, they posted a 6–3 round robin record. This qualified them for the playoffs, where they beat Denmark's Mikkel Krause in the semifinals, before losing to Sweden's Niklas Edin rink in the final, settling for silver. In Grand Slam play, the team competed in four events and reached the playoffs for the first time at the 2020 Canadian Open. There, they lost out to Brad Gushue in the quarterfinals. At the Swiss Championship, the team went 7–2 through the round robin and championship pools, qualifying them for the final against the de Cruz rink. There, they won their first national title by defeating Team de Cruz 5–3. The team was set to represent Switzerland at the 2020 World Men's Curling Championship before the event got cancelled due to the COVID-19 pandemic. The team won the last tour event of the season before it was cancelled due to the pandemic, the 2020 Aberdeen International Curling Championship.

To begin the abbreviated 2020–21 season, Team Schwaller finished runner-up at the 2020 Schweizer Cup, losing in the final to Andrin Schnider. They also lost in the finals of the Adelboden International and the 2.0 Cup, both to the de Cruz rink. They were then, however, able to win the 2020 Curling Masters Champéry, their only tour win of the season. In January 2021, Schwaller competed at the 2021 Swiss Mixed Doubles Curling Championship with partner Briar Hürlimann. The pair finished atop of the round robin standings with a 6–1 record, sending them directly to the best-of-three final where they played Alina Pätz and Sven Michel. They defeated Pätz / Michel two games to zero to claim the Swiss Mixed Doubles title. The pair then played against the 2020 Swiss champion rink of Jenny Perret and Martin Rios to decide who would represent Switzerland at the 2021 World Mixed Doubles Curling Championship. They lost the best-of-five series three games to zero. At the Swiss Championship, the team could not defend their title, losing all three of their matches against the de Cruz rink, including the final. As they had won the Swiss Championship in 2020 but could not participate in the World Championship due to the cancellation, Team Schwaller played Team de Cruz in a best-of-five series to determine which team would represent Switzerland at the 2021 World Men's Curling Championship. After winning the first two games, Team de Cruz defeated Team Schwaller in the other three matches to win the series three games to two, earning themselves the spot at the World Championship. Schwaller and his team ended their season at the 2021 Champions Cup and 2021 Players' Championship Grand Slam events, which were played in a "curling bubble" in Calgary, Alberta, with no spectators, to avoid the spread of the coronavirus. The team failed to reach the playoffs at both events. At the end of the season, Schwaller and Hürlimann won the 2021 WCT Arctic Cup in Dudinka, Russia.

The Schwaller rink had a strong start to the 2021–22 season, winning both the 2021 Baden Masters and the 2021 Euro Super Series tour events. Next, Team Schwaller competed in the 2021 Swiss Olympic Curling Trials where they would face the de Cruz rink in a best-of-seven series to determine who would represent Switzerland at the 2022 Winter Olympics. Despite entering the Trials winning the first two events of the season, Team de Cruz won the first four matches of the event, securing their spot as the Olympic representatives. Back on tour, Team Schwaller reached the semifinals of four events, not able to reach the final in any of them. They played in both the 2021 Masters and 2021 National Slams but failed to reach the playoffs in either event. In the new year, they finished runner-up at the St. Galler Elite Challenge before entering the Swiss Championship. There, the team dominated the field, losing only one game en route to claiming their second Swiss Men's title. With the win, they went on to represent Switzerland at the 2022 World Men's Curling Championship. After having a strong start by winning five out of their first seven games, they finished the round robin in sixth place with a 6–6 record, narrowly qualifying for the playoffs. They then faced Italy's Joël Retornaz in the qualification game, where they lost 10–4 and were eliminated from contention. They ended their season at the 2022 Players' Championship where they lost all three of their games.

In April 2022, Schwaller announced that he would be leaving the Bern Zähringer team. It was later announced that he would skip a new team out of Geneva consisting of Benoît Schwarz-van Berkel, Sven Michel and Pablo Lachat for the 2022–23 season. Schwaller would skip the team but throw third rocks with Schwarz-van Berkel throwing fourth rocks, Michel playing second and Lachat at lead. The new Schwaller rink would represent Switzerland at the 2022 European Curling Championships, where they would go 8–1 in the round robin, but lose to Scotland's Bruce Mouat 5–4 in the final, winning the silver medal. Schwaller would go on to represent Switzerland at the 2023 World Men's Curling Championship, where they would win a bronze medal, beating Italy's Joël Retornaz 11–3 in the bronze medal game. Schwaller would again represent Switzerland at the 2023 European Curling Championships, once again winning a bronze medal over Italy's Retornaz, this time by a score of 8–4 in the bronze medal game. At the 2024 World Men's Curling Championship, the Swiss team would finish a disappointing 7th, going 6–6 in round robin play. However, Schwaller would have a strong season on the Grand Slam of Curling tour, finishing in the semifinals of both the 2023 National and 2023 Masters.

Schwaller would again have a strong start to the 2024–25 curling season. At the Grand Slam events, Schwaller would finish in the quarterfinals of the 2024 Tour Challenge and semifinalists at the 2024 Canadian Open. At the 2024 European Curling Championships, the team would finish 4th, losing to Norway's Magnus Ramsfjell in the bronze medal game. The Schwaller rink would return to the 2025 World Men's Curling Championship, where they would go 9–3 in the round robin, but lose in the final to Scotland's Mouat 5–4.

=== Mixed doubles ===
Schwaller participates in mixed doubles curling with his wife, Briar Schwaller-Hürlimann. Schwaller and Schwaller-Hürlimann have won two Swiss national mixed doubles championships, and have represented Switzerland at the 2023 and 2024 World Mixed Doubles Curling Championships, finishing 7th and 4th respectively. They would also be named the Swiss representatives for the 2026 Winter Olympics mixed doubles tournament.

=== Mixed Team ===
Schwaller has also skipped Switzerland at two World Mixed Curling Championship in 2015 and 2017. At the 2015 World Mixed Curling Championship, he led his team of Meier, Briar Hürlimann and Céline Koller to a 7–1 record in group play. They then beat Scotland in the qualification games before losing to Sweden in the quarterfinals. In 2017, his team, now consisting of Koller, Michael Brunner and Elena Stern finished 4–3 through the round robin, not enough to advance to the playoff round.

== Personal life ==
Schwaller's father is Christof Schwaller, his uncle is Andreas Schwaller, younger brother is Kim Schwaller, and cousin is Xenia Schwaller. Schwaller is employed as a consultant and is currently a psychology student.

In July 2022 he married fellow curler Briar Hürlimann.

== Grand Slam record ==
Key
| C | Champion |
| F | Lost in Final |
| SF | Lost in Semifinal |
| QF | Lost in Quarterfinals |
| R16 | Lost in the round of 16 |
| Q | Did not advance to playoffs |
| T2 | Played in Tier 2 event |
| DNP | Did not participate in event |
| N/A | Not a Grand Slam event that season |

| Event | 2018–19 | 2019–20 | 2020–21 | 2021–22 | 2022–23 | 2023–24 | 2024–25 | 2025–26 | 2026–27 |
|---|---|---|---|---|---|---|---|---|---|
| Invitational | DNP | Q | N/A | N/A | QF | QF | QF | QF | C |
| Masters | Q | Q | N/A | Q | QF | SF | QF | QF | SF |
| National | Q | Q | N/A | Q | Q | SF | DNP | SF | F |
| Open | DNP | QF | N/A | N/A | QF | QF | SF | C | |
| Players' | DNP | N/A | Q | Q | F | Q | F | SF | |
| Champions Cup | Q | N/A | Q | DNP | DNP | N/A | N/A | N/A | N/A |

== Teams ==
| Season | Skip | Third | Second | Lead |
|---|---|---|---|---|
| 2013–14 | Reto Keller (Fourth) | Yannick Schwaller (Skip) | Patrick Witschonke | Michael Probst |
| 2014–15 | Romano Meier (Fourth) | Yannick Schwaller (Skip) | Patrick Witschonke | Michael Probst |
| 2015–16 | Yannick Schwaller | Romano Meier | Patrick Witschonke | Michael Probst |
| 2016–17 | Yannick Schwaller | Romano Meier | Reto Keller | Marcel Käufeler |
| 2017–18 | Yannick Schwaller | Romano Meier | Michael Brunner | Marcel Käufeler |
| 2018–19 | Yannick Schwaller | Michael Brunner | Romano Meier | Marcel Käufeler |
| 2019–20 | Yannick Schwaller | Michael Brunner | Romano Meier | Marcel Käufeler |
| 2020–21 | Yannick Schwaller | Michael Brunner | Romano Meier | Marcel Käufeler |
| 2021–22 | Yannick Schwaller | Michael Brunner | Romano Meier | Marcel Käufeler |
| 2022–23 | Benoît Schwarz (Fourth) | Yannick Schwaller (Skip) | Sven Michel | Pablo Lachat |
| 2023–24 | Benoît Schwarz-van Berkel (Fourth) | Yannick Schwaller (Skip) | Sven Michel | Pablo Lachat |
| 2024–25 | Benoît Schwarz-van Berkel (Fourth) | Yannick Schwaller (Skip) | Sven Michel | Pablo Lachat-Couchepin |
| 2025–26 | Benoît Schwarz-van Berkel (Fourth) | Yannick Schwaller (Skip) | Sven Michel | Pablo Lachat-Couchepin |
| 2026–27 | Benoît Schwarz-van Berkel (Fourth) | Yannick Schwaller (Skip) | Sven Michel | Pablo Lachat-Couchepin |
