= 2019 European Curling Championships =

Curling competition in Sweden and Romania

2019 Le Gruyère AOP European Curling Championships
- Host city: Helsingborg, Sweden (A & B divisions); Brașov, Romania (C division)
- Arena: The Olympia Rink (A & B divisions); Brașov Olympic Ice Rink (C division)
- Dates: November 16–23 (A & B divisions); April 13–17 (C division)
- Men's winner: Sweden
- Curling club: Karlstads CK, Karlstad
- Skip: Niklas Edin
- Third: Oskar Eriksson
- Second: Rasmus Wranå
- Lead: Christoffer Sundgren
- Alternate: Daniel Magnusson
- Finalist: Switzerland (Schwaller)
- Women's winner: Sweden
- Curling club: Sundbybergs CK, Sundbyberg
- Skip: Anna Hasselborg
- Third: Sara McManus
- Second: Agnes Knochenhauer
- Lead: Sofia Mabergs
- Alternate: Johanna Heldin
- Finalist: Scotland (Muirhead)

The 2019 Le Gruyère AOP European Curling Championships was held in 2019 to qualify European curling teams for the 2020 World Curling Championships and World Qualification Event. The A and B division competitions were held from November 16 to 23 at The Olympia Rink in Helsingborg, Sweden. The C division competition was held from April 13 to 17 at the Brașov Olympic Ice Rink in Brașov, Romania.

Seven men's teams, not including the hosts, Scotland, who automatically qualify, qualified for the 2020 World Men's Curling Championship. The next two teams in the A division and top two teams in the B division, not including the hosts, Finland, who automatically qualify, qualified for the 2020 World Qualification Event.

Seven women's teams qualified for the 2020 World Women's Curling Championship. The next two teams in the A division and top two teams in the B division, not including the hosts, Finland, who automatically qualify, qualified for the 2020 World Qualification Event.

== Medalists ==
A Division	Gold	Silver	Bronze
Men	Sweden; Niklas Edin; Oskar Eriksson; Rasmus Wranå; Christoffer Sundgren; Daniel Magnusson	Switzerland; Yannick Schwaller; Michael Brunner; Romano Meier; Marcel Käufeler; Lucien Lottenbach	Scotland; Ross Paterson; Kyle Waddell; Duncan Menzies; Michael Goodfellow; Craig Waddell
Women	Sweden; Anna Hasselborg; Sara McManus; Agnes Knochenhauer; Sofia Mabergs; Johanna Heldin	Scotland; Eve Muirhead; Lauren Gray; Jennifer Dodds; Vicky Wright; Sophie Sinclair	Switzerland; Alina Pätz (Fourth); Silvana Tirinzoni (Skip); Esther Neuenschwander; Melanie Barbezat

== Men ==
=== A division ===
==== Teams ====
A Division Teams

Denmark	England	Germany	Italy	Netherlands
Skip: Mikkel Krause; Third: Mads Nørgård; Second: Tobias Engelhardt; Lead: Henrik Holtermann; Alternate: Kasper Wiksten	Skip: Andrew Reed; Third: Michael Opel; Second: Jamie Malton; Lead: Thomas Jaeggi; Alternate: Andrew Woolston	Skip: Marc Muskatewitz; Third: Sixten Totzek; Second: Joshua Sutor; Lead: Dominik Greindl; Alternate: Benjamin Kapp	Skip: Joël Retornaz; Third: Amos Mosaner; Second: Sebastiano Arman; Lead: Simone Gonin; Alternate: Alberto Pimpini	Fourth: Wouter Gösgens; Skip: Jaap van Dorp; Second: Laurens Hoekman; Lead: Carlo Glasbergen; Alternate: Alexander Magan
Norway	Russia	Scotland	Sweden	Switzerland
Skip: Thomas Ulsrud; Third: Steffen Walstad; Second: Markus Høiberg; Lead: Magnus Vågberg; Alternate: Magnus Nedregotten	Skip: Sergey Glukhov; Third: Alexey Timofeev; Second: Artur Razhabov; Lead: Anton Kalalb; Alternate: Aleksey Tuzov	Skip: Ross Paterson; Third: Kyle Waddell; Second: Duncan Menzies; Lead: Michael Goodfellow; Alternate: Craig Waddell	Skip: Niklas Edin; Third: Oskar Eriksson; Second: Rasmus Wranå; Lead: Christoffer Sundgren; Alternate: Daniel Magnusson	Skip: Yannick Schwaller; Third: Michael Brunner; Second: Romano Meier; Lead: Marcel Käufeler; Alternate: Lucien Lottenbach

==== Round-robin standings ====
Final round-robin standings

Key
Teams to Playoffs and qualified for World Championship
Qualified for World Championship
Team Relegated to 2020 Division B but qualified for World Qualification Event

Country	Skip	W	L	W–L	PF	PA	Ends Won	Ends Lost	Blank Ends	Stolen Ends	Shot Pct.	DSC
Sweden	Niklas Edin	9	0	–	80	31	42	26	7	16	90%	24.78
Switzerland	Yannick Schwaller	6	3	–	66	52	39	37	8	11	84%	30.41
Denmark	Mikkel Krause	5	4	2–1, 1–0	57	61	39	38	10	10	75%	41.16
Scotland	Ross Paterson	5	4	2–1, 0–1	56	48	35	28	18	10	87%	21.61
Italy	Joël Retornaz	5	4	1–2, 1–0	63	58	41	35	8	14	82%	25.25
Norway	Thomas Ulsrud	5	4	1–2, 0–1	56	52	37	37	8	10	84%	29.88
Germany	Marc Muskatewitz	4	5	–	48	63	28	37	15	4	80%	17.29
Netherlands	Jaap van Dorp	3	6	–	51	61	34	38	11	9	78%	55.41
Russia	Sergey Glukhov	2	7	–	48	70	30	39	12	7	76%	32.66
England	Andrew Reed	1	8	–	43	72	31	41	9	1	75%	26.73

==== Round-robin results ====
===== Draw 1 =====
Saturday, November 16, 9:00

Sheet A	1	2	3	4	5	6	7	8	9	10	Final
Switzerland (Schwaller) 🔨	2	0	0	1	2	0	0	3	1	X	9
Netherlands (van Dorp)	0	2	1	0	0	1	0	0	0	X	4

Sheet B	1	2	3	4	5	6	7	8	9	10	Final
Scotland (Paterson) 🔨	3	0	2	0	1	0	2	2	X	X	10
Norway (Ulsrud)	0	1	0	1	0	2	0	0	X	X	4

Sheet C	1	2	3	4	5	6	7	8	9	10	Final
Italy (Retornaz) 🔨	0	2	0	2	0	0	2	2	0	X	8
Russia (Glukhov)	0	0	1	0	2	1	0	0	2	X	6

Sheet D	1	2	3	4	5	6	7	8	9	10	Final
Germany (Muskatewitz)	0	0	2	0	4	0	0	2	0	1	9
England (Reed) 🔨	0	2	0	4	0	0	1	0	1	0	8

Sheet E	1	2	3	4	5	6	7	8	9	10	Final
Sweden (Edin)	2	1	0	2	0	1	1	0	2	X	9
Denmark (Krause) 🔨	0	0	1	0	1	0	0	1	0	X	3

===== Draw 2 =====
Saturday, November 16, 20:00

Sheet A	1	2	3	4	5	6	7	8	9	10	Final
Norway (Ulsrud)	0	1	1	0	0	1	0	1	2	X	6
Germany (Muskatewitz) 🔨	1	0	0	0	1	0	0	0	0	X	2

Sheet B	1	2	3	4	5	6	7	8	9	10	Final
Netherlands (van Dorp)	0	1	2	0	0	2	0	1	0	2	8
England (Reed) 🔨	1	0	0	2	0	0	2	0	0	0	5

Sheet C	1	2	3	4	5	6	7	8	9	10	Final
Sweden (Edin) 🔨	3	0	1	0	0	2	1	1	0	X	8
Switzerland (Schwaller)	0	1	0	2	1	0	0	0	1	X	5

Sheet D	1	2	3	4	5	6	7	8	9	10	Final
Denmark (Krause)	0	0	0	1	0	1	0	2	0	2	6
Russia (Glukhov) 🔨	0	1	1	0	0	0	2	0	0	0	4

Sheet E	1	2	3	4	5	6	7	8	9	10	Final
Scotland (Paterson) 🔨	2	1	1	0	0	1	1	0	0	1	7
Italy (Retornaz)	0	0	0	2	0	0	0	2	1	0	5

===== Draw 3 =====
Sunday, November 17, 14:00

Sheet A	1	2	3	4	5	6	7	8	9	10	Final
Russia (Glukhov)	1	0	0	0	0	2	0	0	5	0	8
Scotland (Paterson) 🔨	0	0	1	1	0	0	0	2	0	1	5

Sheet B	1	2	3	4	5	6	7	8	9	10	Final
Switzerland (Schwaller) 🔨	2	0	0	3	0	1	2	3	X	X	11
Denmark (Krause)	0	2	1	0	2	0	0	0	X	X	5

Sheet C	1	2	3	4	5	6	7	8	9	10	Final
Netherlands (van Dorp)	0	0	1	0	1	1	1	0	0	X	4
Germany (Muskatewitz) 🔨	0	3	0	1	0	0	0	1	1	X	6

Sheet D	1	2	3	4	5	6	7	8	9	10	Final
Italy (Retornaz)	1	1	0	0	1	0	1	0	X	X	4
Sweden (Edin) 🔨	0	0	2	1	0	4	0	4	X	X	11

Sheet E	1	2	3	4	5	6	7	8	9	10	Final
Norway (Ulsrud) 🔨	4	0	2	0	2	0	1	0	X	X	L
England (Reed)	0	2	0	1	0	1	0	1	X	X	W

Norway had to forfeit their game against England for breaking rule 3G: C3(g): "If an alternate player comes into a game, that player must use the brush head of the player being replaced."

===== Draw 4 =====
Monday, November 18, 8:00

Sheet A	1	2	3	4	5	6	7	8	9	10	Final
England (Reed) 🔨	0	0	2	0	1	0	1	0	0	X	4
Sweden (Edin)	2	2	0	2	0	1	0	0	2	X	9

Sheet B	1	2	3	4	5	6	7	8	9	10	Final
Italy (Retornaz)	0	2	1	0	4	1	2	X	X	X	10
Germany (Muskatewitz) 🔨	2	0	0	1	0	0	0	X	X	X	3

Sheet C	1	2	3	4	5	6	7	8	9	10	Final
Denmark (Krause)	0	0	1	0	1	0	2	0	2	1	7
Norway (Ulsrud) 🔨	2	1	0	1	0	2	0	2	0	0	8

Sheet D	1	2	3	4	5	6	7	8	9	10	Final
Russia (Glukhov)	0	1	0	1	0	2	0	2	0	X	6
Switzerland (Schwaller) 🔨	2	0	2	0	4	0	1	0	1	X	10

Sheet E	1	2	3	4	5	6	7	8	9	10	Final
Netherlands (van Dorp)	0	0	1	0	0	0	2	0	X	X	3
Scotland (Paterson) 🔨	3	2	0	0	2	0	0	2	X	X	9

===== Draw 5 =====
Monday, November 18, 16:00

Sheet A	1	2	3	4	5	6	7	8	9	10	11	Final
Italy (Retornaz) 🔨	0	1	0	1	0	3	0	2	0	0	1	8
Norway (Ulsrud)	1	0	3	0	1	0	0	0	0	2	0	7

Sheet B	1	2	3	4	5	6	7	8	9	10	Final
Sweden (Edin) 🔨	2	0	3	2	1	0	2	X	X	X	10
Netherlands (van Dorp)	0	2	0	0	0	1	0	X	X	X	3

Sheet C	1	2	3	4	5	6	7	8	9	10	11	Final
Switzerland (Schwaller)	0	3	1	0	1	1	0	1	0	0	1	8
England (Reed) 🔨	1	0	0	1	0	0	3	0	1	1	0	7

Sheet D	1	2	3	4	5	6	7	8	9	10	11	Final
Scotland (Paterson) 🔨	0	2	0	0	0	0	2	0	0	1	0	5
Denmark (Krause)	1	0	0	1	0	1	0	2	0	0	1	6

Sheet E	1	2	3	4	5	6	7	8	9	10	Final
Germany (Muskatewitz) 🔨	0	0	3	2	0	0	0	2	4	X	11
Russia (Glukhov)	0	1	0	0	3	3	0	0	0	X	7

===== Draw 6 =====
Tuesday, November 19, 9:00

Sheet A	1	2	3	4	5	6	7	8	9	10	Final
Sweden (Edin) 🔨	2	0	4	2	0	1	X	X	X	X	9
Russia (Glukhov)	0	1	0	0	1	0	X	X	X	X	2

Sheet B	1	2	3	4	5	6	7	8	9	10	Final
Norway (Ulsrud) 🔨	1	3	1	0	0	2	0	2	X	X	9
Switzerland (Schwaller)	0	0	0	1	1	0	2	0	X	X	4

Sheet C	1	2	3	4	5	6	7	8	9	10	Final
Germany (Muskatewitz) 🔨	0	0	1	0	1	0	0	X	X	X	2
Scotland (Paterson)	0	0	0	2	0	2	3	X	X	X	7

Sheet D	1	2	3	4	5	6	7	8	9	10	Final
England (Reed) 🔨	0	1	0	1	0	0	X	X	X	X	2
Italy (Retornaz)	1	0	4	0	1	2	X	X	X	X	8

Sheet E	1	2	3	4	5	6	7	8	9	10	Final
Denmark (Krause) 🔨	2	0	1	0	1	0	0	0	2	0	6
Netherlands (van Dorp)	0	2	0	1	0	2	0	1	0	1	7

===== Draw 7 =====
Tuesday, November 19, 19:00

Sheet A	1	2	3	4	5	6	7	8	9	10	Final
Scotland (Paterson) 🔨	0	2	0	1	0	3	0	1	0	X	7
England (Reed)	0	0	1	0	1	0	1	0	2	X	5

Sheet B	1	2	3	4	5	6	7	8	9	10	11	Final
Denmark (Krause)	0	2	0	0	1	0	3	0	2	0	1	9
Italy (Retornaz) 🔨	2	0	0	1	0	1	0	1	0	3	0	8

Sheet C	1	2	3	4	5	6	7	8	9	10	Final
Russia (Glukhov) 🔨	0	0	1	0	2	0	1	0	0	X	4
Netherlands (van Dorp)	1	2	0	1	0	2	0	2	4	X	12

Sheet D	1	2	3	4	5	6	7	8	9	10	Final
Sweden (Edin)	0	2	0	2	1	1	0	1	X	X	7
Norway (Ulsrud) 🔨	1	0	1	0	0	0	0	0	X	X	2

Sheet E	1	2	3	4	5	6	7	8	9	10	Final
Switzerland (Schwaller)	0	2	0	1	0	0	0	0	1	0	4
Germany (Muskatewitz) 🔨	1	0	0	0	2	1	0	0	0	1	5

===== Draw 8 =====
Wednesday, 20 November, 14:00

Sheet A	1	2	3	4	5	6	7	8	9	10	11	Final
Netherlands (van Dorp)	0	0	0	4	0	0	0	1	0	1	0	6
Italy (Retornaz) 🔨	0	1	1	0	1	1	0	0	2	0	1	7

Sheet B	1	2	3	4	5	6	7	8	9	10	Final
Germany (Muskatewitz) 🔨	0	2	0	0	2	0	1	0	0	0	5
Sweden (Edin)	2	0	0	2	0	2	0	0	1	3	10

Sheet C	1	2	3	4	5	6	7	8	9	10	Final
England (Reed) 🔨	2	0	0	1	0	1	0	0	0	X	4
Denmark (Krause)	0	1	1	0	2	0	2	0	2	X	8

Sheet D	1	2	3	4	5	6	7	8	9	10	Final
Switzerland (Schwaller) 🔨	0	0	0	2	0	2	0	0	4	X	8
Scotland (Paterson)	1	1	0	0	0	0	0	1	0	X	3

Sheet E	1	2	3	4	5	6	7	8	9	10	Final
Russia (Glukhov) 🔨	1	1	0	2	0	0	0	0	0	1	5
Norway (Ulsrud)	0	0	1	0	2	1	0	1	1	0	6

===== Draw 9 =====
Thursday, November 21, 9:00

Sheet A	1	2	3	4	5	6	7	8	9	10	Final
Germany (Muskatewitz) 🔨	2	0	0	2	0	0	0	1	0	X	5
Denmark (Krause)	0	1	1	0	0	3	1	0	1	X	7

Sheet B	1	2	3	4	5	6	7	8	9	10	Final
England (Reed) 🔨	0	0	1	0	0	1	0	1	0	X	3
Russia (Glukhov)	0	1	0	2	0	0	1	0	2	X	6

Sheet C	1	2	3	4	5	6	7	8	9	10	Final
Scotland (Paterson)	0	1	0	1	0	0	1	0	0	X	3
Sweden (Edin) 🔨	0	0	2	0	0	3	0	0	2	X	7

Sheet D	1	2	3	4	5	6	7	8	9	10	Final
Norway (Ulsrud)	0	2	0	1	0	0	1	0	0	1	5
Netherlands (van Dorp) 🔨	1	0	1	0	1	0	0	1	0	0	4

Sheet E	1	2	3	4	5	6	7	8	9	10	11	Final
Italy (Retornaz)	1	0	1	1	0	1	0	0	0	1	0	5
Switzerland (Schwaller) 🔨	0	2	0	0	1	0	0	1	1	0	2	7

==== Playoffs ====
Semi-finals
1	Sweden	8
4	Scotland	4
2	Switzerland	8
3	Denmark	5

Gold medal game
1	Sweden	9
2	Switzerland	3
Bronze medal game
4	Scotland	7
3	Denmark	2

===== Semi-finals =====
Thursday, November 21, 19:00

Sheet D	1	2	3	4	5	6	7	8	9	10	Final
Sweden (Edin) 🔨	2	1	0	1	0	0	2	0	2	X	8
Scotland (Paterson)	0	0	1	0	2	0	0	1	0	X	4

Player percentages
Sweden		Scotland	
Christoffer Sundgren	85%	Michael Goodfellow	90%
Rasmus Wranå	89%	Duncan Menzies	78%
Oskar Eriksson	89%	Kyle Waddell	72%
Niklas Edin	86%	Ross Paterson	76%
Total	87%	Total	79%

Sheet C	1	2	3	4	5	6	7	8	9	10	Final
Switzerland (Schwaller) 🔨	2	0	0	1	2	0	1	2	0	X	8
Denmark (Krause)	0	1	0	0	0	2	0	0	2	X	5

Player percentages
Switzerland		Denmark	
Marcel Käufeler	78%	Henrik Holtermann	93%
Romano Meier	91%	Tobias Engelhardt	78%
Michael Brunner	90%	Mads Nørgård	70%
Yannick Schwaller	88%	Mikkel Krause	67%
Total	87%	Total	77%

===== Bronze medal game =====
Friday, November 22, 19:00

Team	1	2	3	4	5	6	7	8	9	10	Final
Scotland (Paterson)	0	0	1	0	0	3	0	3	X	X	7
Denmark (Krause) 🔨	1	0	0	1	0	0	0	0	X	X	2

Player percentages
Scotland		Denmark	
Michael Goodfellow	83%	Henrik Holtermann	73%
Duncan Menzies	89%	Tobias Engelhardt	44%
Kyle Waddell	73%	Mads Nørgård	78%
Ross Paterson	90%	Mikkel Krause	69%
Total	84%	Total	66%

===== Gold medal game =====
Saturday, November 23, 10:00

Team	1	2	3	4	5	6	7	8	9	10	Final
Sweden (Edin) 🔨	2	1	0	0	0	3	0	0	3	X	9
Switzerland (Schwaller)	0	0	0	1	0	0	1	1	0	X	3

Player percentages
Sweden		Switzerland	
Christoffer Sundgren	88%	Marcel Käufeler	89%
Rasmus Wranå	100%	Romano Meier	78%
Oskar Eriksson	92%	Michael Brunner	79%
Niklas Edin	88%	Yannick Schwaller	82%
Total	92%	Total	82%

==== Player percentages ====
Round Robin only

Leads	%
(Sweden) Christoffer Sundgren	92
(Scotland) Michael Goodfellow	91
(Italy) Simone Gonin	90
(Switzerland) Marcel Käufeler	89
(Russia) Anton Kalalb	88

Seconds	%
(Sweden) Rasmus Wranå	91
(Scotland) Duncan Menzies	85
(Norway) Markus Høiberg	84
(Switzerland) Romano Meier	83
(Germany) Joshua Sutor	83

Thirds	%
(Sweden) Oskar Eriksson	88
(Scotland) Kyle Waddell	87
(Switzerland) Michael Brunner	87
(Norway) Steffen Walstad	82
(Italy) Amos Mosaner	81

Skips/Fourths	%
(Sweden) Niklas Edin	89
(Scotland) Ross Paterson	86
(Norway) Thomas Ulsrud	84
(Germany) Marc Muskatewitz	78
(Switzerland) Yannick Schwaller	78

=== B division ===
==== Round-robin standings ====
Final round-robin standings

Key
Teams to Playoffs
Teams to Relegation Playoff

Pool A	Skip	W	L	W–L	DSC
Czech Republic	Lukáš Klíma	6	1	–	19.71
Finland	Jermu Pöllänen	5	2	1–0	38.22
Spain	Sergio Vez	5	2	0–1	38.96
Wales	James Pougher	4	3	–	74.75
Estonia	Harri Lill	3	4	–	43.63
Bulgaria	Reto Seiler	2	5	1–0	72.83
Hungary	Ottó Kalocsay	2	5	0–1	58.62
Slovakia	Pavol Pitoňák	1	6	–	53.07

Pool B	Skip	W	L	W–L	DSC
Poland	Borys Jasiecki	7	0	–	35.80
Turkey	Uğurcan Karagöz	6	1	–	47.36
Belarus	Ilya Shalamitski	4	3	1–1	31.20
France	Eddy Mercier	4	3	1–1	58.06
Latvia	Martins Truksans	4	3	1–1	36.97
Austria	Sebastian Wunderer	1	6	1–1	54.34
Lithuania	Konstantin Rykov	1	6	1–1	81.47
Israel	Alex Pokras	1	6	1–1	96.88

==== Relegation round ====
Relegation Semi-finals
A7	Hungary	4
B7	Lithuania	9
A8	Slovakia	10
B8	Israel	7

Relegation Finals
A7	Hungary	7
A8	Slovakia	6

Remain in B Division
Lithuania
Hungary
Relegated to C Division
Slovakia
Israel

==== Playoffs ====
Qualification games
B2	Turkey	7
A3	Spain	6
A2	Finland	12
B3	Belarus	4

Semi-finals
A1	Czech Republic	9
B2	Turkey	2
B1	Poland	2
A2	Finland	11
5th place game
A3	Spain	8
B3	Belarus	5

Finals
A1	Czech Republic	9
A2	Finland	7
Bronze medal game
B2	Turkey	5
B1	Poland	10

===== Qualification Games =====
Friday, November 22, 09:00

Sheet H	1	2	3	4	5	6	7	8	9	10	11	Final
Turkey (Karagöz) 🔨	0	1	1	0	3	0	0	1	0	0	1	7
Spain (Vez)	0	0	0	1	0	2	1	0	0	2	0	6

Sheet G	1	2	3	4	5	6	7	8	9	10	Final
Finland (Pöllänen) 🔨	0	2	0	3	0	3	2	0	2	X	12
Belarus (Shalamitski)	0	0	1	0	1	0	0	2	0	X	4

===== 5th place game =====
Friday, November 22, 19:00

Team	1	2	3	4	5	6	7	8	9	10	Final
Spain (Vez) 🔨	0	3	0	0	2	0	2	0	1	X	8
Belarus (Shalamitski)	0	0	0	3	0	1	0	1	0	X	5

===== Semi-finals =====
Friday, November 22, 19:00

Sheet B	1	2	3	4	5	6	7	8	9	10	Final
Czech Republic (Klíma) 🔨	2	0	0	2	1	3	0	1	X	X	9
Turkey (Karagöz)	0	0	1	0	0	0	1	0	X	X	2

Sheet E	1	2	3	4	5	6	7	8	9	10	Final
Poland (Jasiecki)	0	0	0	1	0	0	1	0	X	X	2
Finland (Pöllänen) 🔨	4	1	2	0	1	2	0	1	X	X	11

===== Bronze medal game =====
Saturday, November 23, 12:00

Team	1	2	3	4	5	6	7	8	9	10	Final
Turkey (Karagöz)	0	0	1	0	3	0	1	0	0	X	5
Poland (Jasiecki) 🔨	2	2	0	1	0	2	0	1	2	X	10

===== Gold medal game =====
Saturday, November 23, 12:00

Team	1	2	3	4	5	6	7	8	9	10	Final
Czech Republic (Klíma) 🔨	2	1	0	1	0	3	0	2	0	X	9
Finland (Pöllänen)	0	0	1	0	3	0	1	0	2	X	7

=== C division ===
==== Round-robin standings ====
Final round-robin standings

Key
Teams to playoffs

Country	Skip	W	L	W–L	DSC
France	Eddy Mercier	9	0	–	57.13
Bulgaria	Reto Steiler	7	2	–	84.98
Slovenia	Jure Čulić	6	3	1–0	61.02
Romania	Valentin Anghelinei	6	3	0–1	93.80
Ireland	James Russell	5	4	1–0	85.60
Belgium	Timothy Verreycken	5	4	0–1	62.45
Greece	Alexandros Arampatzis	2	7	1–1	111.14
Croatia	Ante Baus	2	7	1–1	114.75
Liechtenstein	Matt Lukas	2	7	1–1	123.08
Luxembourg	Dan Kelly	1	8	–	102.51

==== Playoffs ====
Semi-finals
1	France	8
2	Bulgaria	4
3	Slovenia	9
4	Romania	3

Second place game
2	Bulgaria	7
3	Slovenia	6

Promoted to B Division
France
Bulgaria
Remain in C Division
Slovenia
Romania

===== 1 vs. 2 =====
Sheet C	1	2	3	4	5	6	7	8	9	10	Final
France (Mercier) 🔨	0	4	0	1	1	0	1	0	1	X	8
Bulgaria (Steiler)	0	0	0	0	0	2	0	2	0	X	4

Loser advances to second place game.

===== 3 vs. 4 =====
Sheet D	1	2	3	4	5	6	7	8	9	10	Final
Slovenia (Čulić) 🔨	3	1	2	0	2	0	1	0	X	X	9
Romania (Anghelinei)	0	0	0	1	0	1	0	1	X	X	3

Winner advances to second place game.

===== Second place game =====
Sheet B	1	2	3	4	5	6	7	8	9	10	11	Final
Bulgaria (Steiler) 🔨	1	2	0	2	0	0	0	1	0	0	1	7
Slovenia (Čulić)	0	0	1	0	3	0	0	0	1	1	0	6

==== Final standings ====
Key
Promoted to 2019 B division

Place	Team
1st place, gold medalist(s)	France
2nd place, silver medalist(s)	Bulgaria
3rd place, bronze medalist(s)	Slovenia
4	Romania
5	Ireland
6	Belgium
7	Greece
8	Croatia
9	Liechtenstein
10	Luxembourg

== Women ==
=== A division ===
==== Teams ====
A Division Teams

Czech Republic	Denmark	Estonia	Germany	Latvia
Skip: Anna Kubešková; Third: Alžběta Baudyšová; Second: Petra Vinšová; Lead: Ežen Kolčevská; Alternate: Michaela Baudyšová	Skip: Mathilde Halse; Third Jasmin Lander; Second Karolina Jensen; Lead: My Larsen; Alternate: Gabriella Qvist	Skip: Marie Turmann; Third: Kerli Laidsalu; Second: Heili Grossmann; Lead: Erika Tuvike; Alternate: Liisa Turmann	Skip: Daniela Jentsch; Third: Emira Abbes; Second: Klara-Hermine Fomm; Lead: Analena Jentsch; Alternate: Mia Höhne	Skip: Iveta Staša-Šaršūne; Third: Santa Blumberga; Second: Ieva Krusta; Lead: Evelīna Barone; Alternate: Tīna Siliņa
Norway	Russia	Scotland	Sweden	Switzerland
Fourth: Kristin Skaslien; Skip: Marianne Rørvik; Second: Maia Ramsfjell; Lead: Pia Trulsen; Alternate: Martine Rønning	Skip: Alina Kovaleva; Third: Maria Komarova; Second: Galina Arsenkina; Lead: Ekaterina Kuzmina; Alternate: Anastasia Danshina	Skip: Eve Muirhead; Third: Lauren Gray; Second: Jennifer Dodds; Lead: Vicky Wright; Alternate: Sophie Sinclair	Skip: Anna Hasselborg; Third Sara McManus; Second: Agnes Knochenhauer; Lead: Sofia Mabergs; Alternate: Johanna Heldin	Fourth: Alina Pätz; Skip Silvana Tirinzoni; Second: Esther Neuenschwander; Lead: Melanie Barbezat

==== Round-robin standings ====
Final round-robin standings

Key
Teams to Playoffs and qualified for World Championship
Qualified for World Championship
Qualified for World Qualification Event
Team Relegated to 2020 Group B but qualified for World Qualification Event
Team Relegated to 2020 Group B

Country	Skip	W	L	W–L	PF	PA	Ends Won	Ends Lost	Blank Ends	Stolen Ends	Shot Pct.	DSC
Switzerland	Silvana Tirinzoni	8	1	1–0	77	43	45	26	9	15	83%	
Russia	Alina Kovaleva	8	1	0–1	68	37	41	25	10	14	81%	
Sweden	Anna Hasselborg	7	2	1–0	65	42	32	32	13	5	84%	
Scotland	Eve Muirhead	7	2	0–1	67	59	38	39	7	10	80%	
Germany	Daniela Jentsch	5	4	–	61	55	39	31	11	11	77%	
Czech Republic	Anna Kubešková	3	6	–	53	60	36	40	8	8	74%	
Denmark	Mathilde Halse	2	7	1–1	43	60	32	37	9	5	68%	46.98
Estonia	Marie Turmann	2	7	1–1	52	65	34	45	7	8	69%	53.17
Norway	Marianne Rørvik	2	7	1–1	41	67	31	45	7	5	72%	89.63
Latvia	Iveta Staša-Šaršūne	1	8	–	39	78	32	41	3	8	74%	

==== Round-robin results ====
===== Draw 1 =====
Saturday, November 16, 15:00

Sheet A	1	2	3	4	5	6	7	8	9	10	Final
Estonia (Turmann)	0	0	0	0	0	1	0	0	X	X	1
Russia (Kovaleva) 🔨	0	1	2	2	1	0	0	1	X	X	7

Sheet B	1	2	3	4	5	6	7	8	9	10	Final
Denmark (Halse)	0	0	1	0	0	1	0	0	1	X	3
Sweden (Hasselborg) 🔨	0	3	0	0	2	0	0	1	0	X	6

Sheet C	1	2	3	4	5	6	7	8	9	10	Final
Scotland (Muirhead)	0	1	0	0	1	0	2	1	1	1	7
Norway (Rørvik) 🔨	1	0	1	1	0	1	0	0	0	0	4

Sheet D	1	2	3	4	5	6	7	8	9	10	Final
Switzerland (Tirinzoni) 🔨	1	0	2	0	1	0	0	0	0	2	6
Germany (Jentsch)	0	1	0	2	0	1	0	0	1	0	5

Sheet E	1	2	3	4	5	6	7	8	9	10	Final
Czech Republic (Kubešková)	0	2	1	1	1	0	2	1	X	X	8
Latvia (Staša-Šaršūne) 🔨	1	0	0	0	0	1	0	0	X	X	2

===== Draw 2 =====
Sunday, November 17, 9:00

Sheet A	1	2	3	4	5	6	7	8	9	10	Final
Sweden (Hasselborg)	0	0	2	0	0	1	0	X	X	X	3
Switzerland (Tirinzoni) 🔨	2	1	0	2	1	0	3	X	X	X	9

Sheet B	1	2	3	4	5	6	7	8	9	10	Final
Russia (Kovaleva) 🔨	2	0	0	2	0	0	1	1	0	1	7
Germany (Jentsch)	0	1	0	0	2	0	0	0	2	0	5

Sheet C	1	2	3	4	5	6	7	8	9	10	Final
Czech Republic (Kubešková)	1	0	0	0	1	0	1	0	2	0	5
Estonia (Turmann) 🔨	0	0	1	1	0	2	0	1	0	1	6

Sheet D	1	2	3	4	5	6	7	8	9	10	Final
Latvia (Staša-Šaršūne) 🔨	1	0	1	0	1	0	0	1	1	0	5
Norway (Rørvik)	0	1	0	1	0	1	2	0	0	1	6

Sheet E	1	2	3	4	5	6	7	8	9	10	11	Final
Denmark (Halse) 🔨	0	0	1	0	1	1	0	1	0	2	0	6
Scotland (Muirhead)	1	0	0	1	0	0	2	0	2	0	1	7

===== Draw 3 =====
Sunday, November 17, 19:00

Sheet A	1	2	3	4	5	6	7	8	9	10	Final
Norway (Rørvik)	0	1	0	2	0	0	0	0	0	X	3
Denmark (Halse) 🔨	1	0	1	0	0	0	3	1	1	X	7

Sheet B	1	2	3	4	5	6	7	8	9	10	11	Final
Estonia (Turmann) 🔨	3	0	0	0	4	0	0	2	0	0	0	9
Latvia (Staša-Šaršūne)	0	1	1	1	0	3	1	0	1	1	1	10

Sheet C	1	2	3	4	5	6	7	8	9	10	Final
Russia (Kovaleva)	0	0	1	0	1	0	0	1	0	X	3
Switzerland (Tirinzoni) 🔨	0	2	0	1	0	1	1	0	2	X	7

Sheet D	1	2	3	4	5	6	7	8	9	10	Final
Scotland (Muirhead) 🔨	1	0	1	0	2	0	2	2	0	X	8
Czech Republic (Kubešková)	0	1	0	1	0	2	0	0	1	X	5

Sheet E	1	2	3	4	5	6	7	8	9	10	Final
Sweden (Hasselborg)	0	0	2	0	2	0	2	0	0	X	6
Germany (Jentsch) 🔨	0	1	0	1	0	0	0	1	0	X	3

===== Draw 4 =====
Monday, November 18, 12:00

Sheet A	1	2	3	4	5	6	7	8	9	10	Final
Germany (Jentsch)	0	2	1	0	0	1	1	0	3	1	9
Czech Republic (Kubešková) 🔨	3	0	0	0	3	0	0	2	0	0	8

Sheet B	1	2	3	4	5	6	7	8	9	10	Final
Scotland (Muirhead)	0	2	0	2	0	0	0	3	0	2	9
Switzerland (Tirinzoni) 🔨	3	0	1	0	1	1	0	0	2	0	8

Sheet C	1	2	3	4	5	6	7	8	9	10	Final
Latvia (Staša-Šaršūne)	0	1	0	0	1	0	X	X	X	X	2
Sweden (Hasselborg) 🔨	1	0	2	1	0	5	X	X	X	X	9

Sheet D	1	2	3	4	5	6	7	8	9	10	Final
Norway (Rørvik)	0	0	0	2	0	0	3	0	1	1	7
Estonia (Turmann) 🔨	1	1	0	0	2	1	0	1	0	0	6

Sheet E	1	2	3	4	5	6	7	8	9	10	Final
Russia (Kovaleva) 🔨	2	0	2	3	0	2	X	X	X	X	9
Denmark (Halse)	0	2	0	0	1	0	X	X	X	X	3

===== Draw 5 =====
Monday, November 18, 20:00

Sheet A	1	2	3	4	5	6	7	8	9	10	Final
Scotland (Muirhead)	0	2	0	0	0	2	0	0	0	X	4
Sweden (Hasselborg) 🔨	0	0	2	1	0	0	0	4	4	X	11

Sheet B	1	2	3	4	5	6	7	8	9	10	Final
Czech Republic (Kubešková)	0	1	0	1	0	1	0	0	X	X	3
Russia (Kovaleva) 🔨	2	0	2	0	1	0	0	2	X	X	7

Sheet C	1	2	3	4	5	6	7	8	9	10	11	Final
Estonia (Turmann)	0	0	0	0	0	1	2	0	2	1	0	6
Germany (Jentsch) 🔨	1	1	1	0	1	0	0	2	0	0	1	7

Sheet D	1	2	3	4	5	6	7	8	9	10	Final
Denmark (Halse)	0	2	1	0	0	3	1	0	1	X	8
Latvia (Staša-Šaršūne) 🔨	1	0	0	1	1	0	0	1	0	X	4

Sheet E	1	2	3	4	5	6	7	8	9	10	Final
Switzerland (Tirinzoni) 🔨	0	2	0	2	0	0	2	1	4	X	11
Norway (Rørvik)	0	0	2	0	1	0	0	0	0	X	3

===== Draw 6 =====
Tuesday, November 19, 14:00

Sheet A	1	2	3	4	5	6	7	8	9	10	Final
Czech Republic (Kubešková)	1	0	1	1	0	2	0	1	0	0	6
Norway (Rørvik) 🔨	0	1	0	0	1	0	1	0	1	1	5

Sheet B	1	2	3	4	5	6	7	8	9	10	Final
Sweden (Hasselborg) 🔨	0	3	0	1	0	2	0	0	1	X	7
Estonia (Turmann)	0	0	1	0	1	0	0	1	0	X	3

Sheet C	1	2	3	4	5	6	7	8	9	10	Final
Switzerland (Tirinzoni)	0	2	1	0	0	1	1	0	1	X	6
Denmark (Halse) 🔨	1	0	0	2	0	0	0	1	0	X	4

Sheet D	1	2	3	4	5	6	7	8	9	10	Final
Germany (Jentsch)	0	1	2	0	1	0	1	0	X	X	5
Scotland (Muirhead) 🔨	2	0	0	3	0	2	0	3	X	X	10

Sheet E	1	2	3	4	5	6	7	8	9	10	Final
Latvia (Staša-Šaršūne) 🔨	0	0	0	1	0	0	2	0	2	0	5
Russia (Kovaleva)	1	2	0	0	0	2	0	2	0	1	8

===== Draw 7 =====
Wednesday, November 20, 9:00

Sheet A	1	2	3	4	5	6	7	8	9	10	Final
Denmark (Halse)	0	1	0	0	2	0	X	X	X	X	3
Germany (Jentsch) 🔨	4	0	2	2	0	1	X	X	X	X	9

Sheet B	1	2	3	4	5	6	7	8	9	10	Final
Latvia (Staša-Šaršūne)	2	0	1	0	1	0	0	X	X	X	4
Scotland (Muirhead) 🔨	0	1	0	3	0	4	2	X	X	X	10

Sheet C	1	2	3	4	5	6	7	8	9	10	Final
Norway (Rørvik)	0	0	0	2	0	0	X	X	X	X	2
Russia (Kovaleva) 🔨	2	2	2	0	1	2	X	X	X	X	9

Sheet D	1	2	3	4	5	6	7	8	9	10	Final
Czech Republic (Kubešková)	0	0	2	0	0	1	0	0	1	Х	4
Sweden (Hasselborg) 🔨	2	0	0	2	1	0	0	3	0	Х	8

Sheet E	1	2	3	4	5	6	7	8	9	10	Final
Estonia (Turmann)	1	0	0	0	3	0	2	0	X	X	6
Switzerland (Tirinzoni) 🔨	0	3	1	2	0	4	0	1	X	X	11

===== Draw 8 =====
Wednesday, November 20, 19:00

Sheet A	1	2	3	4	5	6	7	8	9	10	Final
Russia (Kovaleva)	0	0	0	3	0	1	0	3	3	X	10
Scotland (Muirhead) 🔨	2	0	1	0	0	0	2	0	0	X	5

Sheet B	1	2	3	4	5	6	7	8	9	10	Final
Switzerland (Tirinzoni)	0	2	2	0	2	0	0	1	2	1	10
Czech Republic (Kubešková) 🔨	1	0	0	4	0	2	0	0	0	0	7

Sheet C	1	2	3	4	5	6	7	8	9	10	Final
Germany (Jentsch) 🔨	3	0	2	0	3	0	3	X	X	X	11
Latvia (Staša-Šaršūne)	0	1	0	2	0	1	0	X	X	X	4

Sheet D	1	2	3	4	5	6	7	8	9	10	Final
Estonia (Turmann)	1	0	1	0	3	0	2	0	2	X	9
Denmark (Halse) 🔨	0	1	0	1	0	1	0	1	0	X	4

Sheet E	1	2	3	4	5	6	7	8	9	10	Final
Norway (Rørvik) 🔨	1	1	0	1	0	2	0	1	0	X	6
Sweden (Hasselborg)	0	0	3	0	2	0	2	0	2	X	9

===== Draw 9 =====
Thursday, November 21, 14:00

Sheet A	1	2	3	4	5	6	7	8	9	10	Final
Switzerland (Tirinzoni) 🔨	3	1	0	1	0	0	2	2	X	X	9
Latvia (Staša-Šaršūne)	0	0	1	0	2	0	0	0	X	X	3

Sheet B	1	2	3	4	5	6	7	8	9	10	Final
Germany (Jentsch)	0	1	0	1	0	2	0	1	0	2	7
Norway (Rørvik) 🔨	2	0	1	0	0	0	0	0	2	0	5

Sheet C	1	2	3	4	5	6	7	8	9	10	Final
Denmark (Halse)	0	2	0	0	2	0	0	0	1	0	5
Czech Republic (Kubešková) 🔨	3	0	1	1	0	0	0	1	0	1	7

Sheet D	1	2	3	4	5	6	7	8	9	10	Final
Sweden (Hasselborg) 🔨	0	2	0	2	0	0	1	0	1	0	6
Russia (Kovaleva)	1	0	1	0	2	1	0	2	0	1	8

Sheet E	1	2	3	4	5	6	7	8	9	10	Final
Scotland (Muirhead)	1	0	2	0	0	1	1	0	2	0	7
Estonia (Turmann) 🔨	0	2	0	1	1	0	0	1	0	1	6

==== Playoffs ====
Semi-finals
1	Switzerland	2
4	Scotland	3
2	Russia	3
3	Sweden	9

Gold medal game
4	Scotland	4
3	Sweden	5
Bronze medal game
1	Switzerland	6
2	Russia	5

===== Semi-finals =====
Friday, November 22, 14:00

Sheet D	1	2	3	4	5	6	7	8	9	10	11	Final
Switzerland (Tirinzoni) 🔨	0	1	0	0	0	0	0	0	0	1	0	2
Scotland (Muirhead)	0	0	0	1	0	0	0	1	0	0	1	3

Player percentages
Switzerland		Scotland	
Melanie Barbezat	88%	Vicky Wright	93%
Esther Neuenschwander	77%	Jennifer Dodds	84%
Silvana Tirinzoni	81%	Lauren Gray	97%
Alina Pätz	85%	Eve Muirhead	88%
Total	83%	Total	91%

Sheet C	1	2	3	4	5	6	7	8	9	10	Final
Russia (Kovaleva) 🔨	1	0	0	1	0	0	1	0	X	X	3
Sweden (Hasselborg)	0	2	1	0	0	1	0	5	X	X	9

Player percentages
Russia		Sweden	
Ekaterina Kuzmina	81%	Sofia Mabergs	97%
Galina Arsenkina	77%	Agnes Knochenhauer	92%
Maria Komarova	55%	Sara McManus	78%
Alina Kovaleva	70%	Anna Hasselborg	88%
Total	71%	Total	89%

===== Bronze medal game =====
Friday, November 22, 19:00

Team	1	2	3	4	5	6	7	8	9	10	Final
Switzerland (Tirinzoni) 🔨	0	1	0	0	1	1	1	1	0	1	6
Russia (Kovaleva)	1	0	1	1	0	0	0	0	2	0	5

Player percentages
Switzerland		Russia	
Melanie Barbezat	79%	Ekaterina Kuzmina	86%
Esther Neuenschwander	84%	Galina Arsenkina	70%
Silvana Tirinzoni	81%	Maria Komarova	70%
Alina Pätz	68%	Alina Kovaleva	64%
Total	78%	Total	73%

===== Gold medal game =====
Saturday, November 23, 15:00

Team	1	2	3	4	5	6	7	8	9	10	Final
Scotland (Muirhead)	0	0	0	2	0	0	0	1	1	0	4
Sweden (Hasselborg) 🔨	0	1	1	0	0	1	0	0	0	2	5

Player percentages
Scotland		Sweden	
Vicky Wright	84%	Sofia Mabergs	93%
Jennifer Dodds	89%	Agnes Knochenhauer	76%
Lauren Gray	90%	Sara McManus	85%
Eve Muirhead	85%	Anna Hasselborg	84%
Total	87%	Total	85%

==== Player percentages ====
Round Robin only

Leads	%
(Switzerland) Melanie Barbezat	91
(Scotland) Vicky Wright	87
(Latvia) Evelīna Barone	87
(Russia) Ekaterina Kuzmina	85
(Norway) Pia Trulsen	85

Seconds	%
(Sweden) Agnes Knochenhauer	86
(Switzerland) Esther Neuenschwander	81
(Scotland) Jennifer Dodds	79
(Russia) Galina Arsenkina	77
(Germany) Klara-Hermine Fomm	75

Thirds	%
(Switzerland) Silvana Tirinzoni	83
(Sweden) Sara McManus	83
(Russia) Maria Komarova	82
(Scotland) Lauren Gray	79
(Germany) Emira Abbes	76

Skips/Fourths	%
(Sweden) Anna Hasselborg	81
(Russia) Alina Kovaleva	79
(Switzerland) Alina Pätz	78
(Scotland) Eve Muirhead	74
(Germany) Daniela Jentsch	74

=== B division ===
==== Round-robin standings ====
Final round-robin standings

Key
Teams to Playoffs
Teams to Relegated to 2020 C Division

Country	Skip	W	L	W–L	DSC
Turkey	Dilşat Yıldız	7	2	1–0	63.35
Italy	Veronica Zappone	7	2	0–1	50.95
Hungary	Dorottya Palancsa	6	3	1–0	65.29
England	Lisa Farnell	6	3	0–1	81.24
Slovakia	Gabriela Kajanová	5	4	–	101.31
Finland	Elina Virtaala	4	5	1–0	72.46
Spain	Oihane Otaegi	4	5	0–1	111.97
Belarus	Alina Pauliuchyk	3	6	–	68.10
Poland	Marta Pluta	2	7	–	84.56
Lithuania	Asta Vaičekonytė	1	8	–	79.93

==== Playoffs ====
Semi-finals
1	Turkey	9
4	England	4
2	Italy	9
3	Hungary	4

Gold medal game
1	Turkey	2
2	Italy	5
Bronze medal game
4	England	2
3	Hungary	9

===== Semi-finals =====
Friday, November 22, 09:00

Sheet C	1	2	3	4	5	6	7	8	9	10	Final
Turkey (Yıldız) 🔨	1	0	1	0	2	0	1	0	4	X	9
England (Farnell)	0	1	0	1	0	1	0	1	0	X	4

Sheet D	1	2	3	4	5	6	7	8	9	10	Final
Italy (Zappone) 🔨	1	0	2	0	0	4	1	1	0	X	9
Hungary (Palancsa)	0	1	0	2	0	0	0	0	1	X	4

===== Bronze medal game =====
Saturday, November 23, 12:00

Sheet 2	1	2	3	4	5	6	7	8	9	10	Final
England (Farnell)	1	0	0	0	0	0	1	0	0	X	2
Hungary (Palancsa) 🔨	0	0	0	0	2	2	0	1	4	X	9

===== Gold medal game =====
Saturday, November 23, 12:00

Sheet 1	1	2	3	4	5	6	7	8	9	10	Final
Turkey (Yıldız) 🔨	0	0	0	1	0	0	1	0	0	X	2
Italy (Zappone)	0	0	2	0	2	1	0	0	0	X	5

=== C division ===
==== Round-robin standings ====
Final round-robin standings

Key
Teams to playoffs

Country	Skip	W	L	W–L	DSC
Belarus	Alina Pavlyuchik	6	1	–	89.47
Slovakia	Gabriela Kajanová	5	2	–	141.93
Slovenia	Ajda Zavrtanik Drglin	4	3	–	100.45
Austria	Constanze Ocker	3	4	2–1	71.68
Ireland	Alison Fyfe	3	4	2–1	76.88
Croatia	Iva Penava	3	4	2–1	115.04
France	Stéphanie Barbarin	3	4	0–3	119.10
Romania	Iulia Ioana Traila	1	6	–	135.22

==== Playoffs ====
Semi-finals
1	Belarus	8
2	Slovakia	6
3	Slovenia	5
4	Austria	7

Second place game
2	Slovakia	8
4	Austria	4

Promoted to B Division
Belarus
Slovakia
Remain in C Division
Austria
Slovenia

===== 1 vs. 2 =====
Sheet B	1	2	3	4	5	6	7	8	9	10	Final
Belarus (Pavlyuchik) 🔨	0	0	0	0	3	1	0	0	2	2	8
Slovakia (Kajanová)	1	0	1	3	0	0	1	0	0	0	6

Loser advances to second place game.

===== 3 vs. 4 =====
Sheet A	1	2	3	4	5	6	7	8	9	10	Final
Slovenia (Drglin) 🔨	0	0	3	1	0	0	0	0	1	0	5
Austria (Ocker)	0	0	0	0	1	0	1	4	0	1	7

Winner advances to second place game.

===== Second place game =====
Sheet C	1	2	3	4	5	6	7	8	9	10	Final
Slovakia (Kajanová) 🔨	1	1	0	1	3	1	0	1	0	X	8
Austria (Ocker)	0	0	1	0	0	0	1	0	2	X	4

==== Final standings ====
Key
Promoted to 2019 B division

Place	Team
1st place, gold medalist(s)	Belarus
2nd place, silver medalist(s)	Slovakia
3rd place, bronze medalist(s)	Austria
4	Slovenia
5	Ireland
6	Croatia
7	France
8	Romania
