= 2021 Baden Masters =

World Curling Tour event

- Host city: Baden, Switzerland
- Arena: Curling Club Baden Regio
- Dates: August 20–22
- Winner: (Switzerland) Team Schwaller
- Curling club: Curling Bern, Bern
- Skip: Yannick Schwaller
- Third: Michael Brunner
- Second: Romano Meier
- Lead: Marcel Käufeler
- Finalist: (Switzerland) Peter de Cruz

The 2021 Baden Masters was held from August 20 to 22 at the Curling Club Baden Regio in Baden, Switzerland as part of the World Curling Tour. The event was held in a round-robin format with a purse of 35,000 CHF. It was the first men's event of the 2021–22 curling season. The event category for the event was 500.

In the final, Yannick Schwaller and his team from Bern defeated the Peter de Cruz rink from Geneva in a rematch of the 2021 Swiss Men's Curling Championship final. The final also served as a precursor for the 2021 Swiss Olympic Curling Trials which will be held September 22–26 to determine the Swiss team that will represent Switzerland at the 2022 Winter Olympics. To reach the final, Schwaller defeated the 2021 World Champions and reigning Baden Masters champions Team Niklas Edin from Karlstad, Sweden 5–4 and de Cruz beat the Steffen Walstad rink from Oslo, Norway 5–3. Teams Noé Traub, Joël Retornaz, Yves Stocker and Magnus Ramsfjell all reached the quarterfinals.

For the first time in the event's twenty-one year history, two women's teams competed alongside the men's field. Originally, two teams from Scotland were scheduled to compete, but had to pull out last minute due to the slow vaccination rate in the United Kingdom. 2018 Olympic Gold Medalists Team Anna Hasselborg from Sweden competed in Pool D and Team Irene Schori of Limmattal, Switzerland competed in Pool B.

== Teams ==
The teams are listed as follows:

Skip	Third	Second	Lead	Alternate	Locale
Jannis Bannwart	Kim Schwaller	Andreas Gerlach	Baptiste Défago	Fabio Da Ros	St. Gallen, Switzerland
Benoît Schwarz (Fourth)	Sven Michel	Peter de Cruz (Skip)	Valentin Tanner		Geneva, Switzerland
Niklas Edin	Oskar Eriksson	Rasmus Wranå	Christoffer Sundgren		Karlstad, Sweden
Anna Hasselborg	Sara McManus	Agnes Knochenhauer	Sofia Mabergs		Sundbyberg, Sweden
Marco Hösli	Philipp Hösli	Marco Hefti	Justin Hausherr		Glarus, Switzerland
Dean Hürlimann	Matthieu Fague	Nicolas Romang	Jan Tanner		Zug, Switzerland
Marc Pfister (Fourth)	Tim Jungen	Björn Jungen (Skip)	Simon Gempeler	Enrico Pfister	Bern, Switzerland
Lukáš Klíma	Marek Cernovsky	Jiri Candra	Samuel Mokriš		Prague, Czech Republic
Daniel Magnusson	Rasmus Israelsson	Robin Ahlberg	Anton Regosa	Arvid Norin	Karlstad, Sweden
Magnus Nedregotten	Mathias Brænden	Alexander Lindström	Nicolai Sommervold		Lillehammer, Norway
Magnus Ramsfjell	Martin Sesaker	Bendik Ramsfjell	Gaute Nepstad		Trondheim, Norway
Joël Retornaz	Amos Mosaner	Sebastiano Arman	Simone Gonin		Pinerolo, Italy
Andrin Schnider	Nicola Stoll	Felix Eberhard	Fabian Schmid		Schaffhausen, Switzerland
Irene Schori	Carole Howald	Lara Stocker	Stefanie Berset		Langenthal, Switzerland
Yannick Schwaller	Michael Brunner	Romano Meier	Marcel Käufeler		Bern, Switzerland
Jan Hess (Fourth)	Yves Stocker (Skip)	Simon Gloor	Reto Schönenberger		Zug, Switzerland
Sixten Totzek	Marc Muskatewitz	Joshua Sutor	Dominik Greindl		Munich, Germany
Anthony Petoud (Fourth)	Noé Traub (Skip)	Pablo Lachat	Theo Kurz		Lausanne, Switzerland
Wouter Gösgens (Fourth)	Jaap van Dorp (Skip)	Laurens Hoekman	Carlo Glasbergen		Zoetermeer, Netherlands
Steffen Walstad	Torger Nergård	Markus Høiberg	Magnus Vågberg		Oslo, Norway

== Round-robin standings ==
Final round-robin standings

Key
Teams to Playoffs

Pool A	W	L	PF	PA	DSC
(Switzerland) Peter de Cruz	4	0	31	11	11.53
(Norway) Steffen Walstad	3	1	23	17	32.70
(Switzerland) Björn Jungen	2	2	18	17	104.43
(Sweden) Daniel Magnusson	1	3	12	27	23.13
(Switzerland) Dean Hürlimann	0	4	12	24	56.03

Pool B	W	L	PF	PA	DSC
(Sweden) Niklas Edin	4	0	31	16	14.43
(Switzerland) Noé Traub	2	2	27	20	14.43
(Germany) Sixten Totzek	2	2	27	23	23.50
(Norway) Magnus Nedregotten	1	3	20	25	50.50
(Switzerland) Irene Schori	1	3	12	32	95.03

Pool C	W	L	PF	PA	DSC
(Italy) Joël Retornaz	4	0	26	14	29.30
(Norway) Magnus Ramsfjell	3	1	21	16	39.63
(Switzerland) Marco Hösli	2	2	21	16	68.90
(Netherlands) Jaap van Dorp	1	3	19	21	108.57
(Switzerland) Jannis Bannwart	0	4	8	28	78.07

Pool D	W	L	PF	PA	DSC
(Switzerland) Yannick Schwaller	4	0	31	8	13.80
(Switzerland) Yves Stocker	2	2	19	26	12.67
(Switzerland) Andrin Schnider	2	2	20	22	21.07
(Sweden) Anna Hasselborg	2	2	19	23	50.87
(Czech Republic) Lukáš Klíma	0	4	20	30	99.27

== Round-robin results ==
All draw times listed in Central European Time.

=== Draw 1 ===
Friday, August 20, 8:00 am

Sheet 1	1	2	3	4	5	6	7	8	Final
(Norway) Magnus Nedregotten	0	1	0	0	3	1	0	2	7
(Germany) Sixten Totzek	1	0	0	2	0	0	2	0	5

Sheet 2	1	2	3	4	5	6	7	8	Final
(Switzerland) Björn Jungen	0	1	2	1	2	2	X	X	8
(Sweden) Daniel Magnusson	0	0	0	0	0	0	X	X	0

Sheet 3	1	2	3	4	5	6	7	8	Final
(Switzerland) Irene Schori	0	0	0	0	0	1	0	X	1
(Switzerland) Noé Traub	0	1	2	2	0	0	1	X	6

Sheet 4	1	2	3	4	5	6	7	8	Final
(Switzerland) Dean Hürlimann	0	0	0	1	0	2	X	X	3
(Norway) Steffen Walstad	3	2	1	0	2	0	X	X	8

=== Draw 2 ===
Friday, August 20, 10:30 am

Sheet 1	1	2	3	4	5	6	7	8	Final
(Sweden) Anna Hasselborg	0	1	0	0	0	2	0	3	6
(Czech Republic) Lukáš Klíma	2	0	0	1	1	0	1	0	5

Sheet 2	1	2	3	4	5	6	7	8	Final
(Switzerland) Marco Hösli	0	0	0	1	1	0	1	1	4
(Norway) Magnus Ramsfjell	2	1	0	0	0	2	0	0	5

Sheet 3	1	2	3	4	5	6	7	8	Final
(Switzerland) Yves Stocker	1	0	0	3	0	1	1	0	6
(Switzerland) Andrin Schnider	0	1	0	0	2	0	0	1	4

Sheet 4	1	2	3	4	5	6	7	8	9	Final
(Italy) Joël Retornaz	0	1	0	0	2	1	1	0	1	6
(Netherlands) Jaap van Dorp	2	0	1	1	0	0	0	1	0	5

=== Draw 3 ===
Friday, August 20, 1:00 pm

Sheet 1	1	2	3	4	5	6	7	8	Final
(Switzerland) Dean Hürlimann	1	0	0	0	0	2	0	X	3
(Switzerland) Björn Jungen	0	0	2	0	1	0	2	X	5

Sheet 2	1	2	3	4	5	6	7	8	Final
(Norway) Steffen Walstad	0	0	2	0	1	0	0	X	3
(Switzerland) Peter de Cruz	0	2	0	2	0	1	3	X	8

Sheet 3	1	2	3	4	5	6	7	8	Final
(Germany) Sixten Totzek	0	1	0	0	2	0	0	1	4
(Sweden) Niklas Edin	1	0	2	1	0	1	1	0	6

Sheet 4	1	2	3	4	5	6	7	8	Final
(Norway) Magnus Nedregotten	1	0	2	0	1	0	2	0	6
(Switzerland) Irene Schori	0	2	0	2	0	2	0	1	7

=== Draw 4 ===
Friday, August 20, 4:00 pm

Sheet 1	1	2	3	4	5	6	7	8	9	Final
(Italy) Joël Retornaz	1	0	0	1	0	1	1	0	1	5
(Switzerland) Marco Hösli	0	0	1	0	2	0	0	1	0	4

Sheet 2	1	2	3	4	5	6	7	8	Final
(Netherlands) Jaap van Dorp	2	0	2	2	1	0	2	X	9
(Switzerland) Jannis Bannwart	0	2	0	0	0	1	0	X	3

Sheet 3	1	2	3	4	5	6	7	8	Final
(Czech Republic) Lukáš Klíma	1	0	1	0	2	0	0	X	4
(Switzerland) Yannick Schwaller	0	1	0	4	0	1	4	X	10

Sheet 4	1	2	3	4	5	6	7	8	Final
(Sweden) Anna Hasselborg	0	0	2	1	1	0	2	3	9
(Switzerland) Yves Stocker	1	0	0	0	0	3	0	0	4

=== Draw 5 ===
Friday, August 20, 6:30 pm

Sheet 1	1	2	3	4	5	6	7	8	9	Final
(Switzerland) Noé Traub	1	0	0	2	0	3	0	1	0	7
(Sweden) Niklas Edin	0	3	0	0	2	0	2	0	2	9

Sheet 2	1	2	3	4	5	6	7	8	Final
(Switzerland) Irene Schori	0	1	0	2	1	0	0	0	4
(Germany) Sixten Totzek	1	0	1	0	0	3	1	4	10

Sheet 3	1	2	3	4	5	6	7	8	Final
(Switzerland) Björn Jungen	0	1	0	1	1	0	1	X	4
(Norway) Steffen Walstad	3	0	1	0	0	1	0	X	5

Sheet 4	1	2	3	4	5	6	7	8	Final
(Sweden) Daniel Magnusson	0	1	0	0	0	3	0	X	4
(Switzerland) Peter de Cruz	3	0	2	1	2	0	1	X	9

=== Draw 6 ===
Friday, August 20, 9:00 pm

Sheet 1	1	2	3	4	5	6	7	8	Final
(Switzerland) Andrin Schnider	0	1	0	1	0	0	X	X	2
(Switzerland) Yannick Schwaller	2	0	2	0	2	1	X	X	7

Sheet 2	1	2	3	4	5	6	7	8	9	Final
(Switzerland) Yves Stocker	0	2	0	2	0	1	1	0	1	7
(Czech Republic) Lukáš Klíma	0	0	3	0	1	0	0	2	0	6

Sheet 3	1	2	3	4	5	6	7	8	Final
(Switzerland) Marco Hösli	1	0	0	3	1	2	0	X	7
(Netherlands) Jaap van Dorp	0	0	4	0	0	0	0	X	4

Sheet 4	1	2	3	4	5	6	7	8	Final
(Norway) Magnus Ramsfjell	5	0	1	1	0	X	X	X	7
(Switzerland) Jannis Bannwart	0	1	0	0	1	X	X	X	2

=== Draw 7 ===
Saturday, August 21, 8:00 am

Sheet 1	1	2	3	4	5	6	7	8	Final
(Switzerland) Peter de Cruz	3	0	6	X	X	X	X	X	9
(Switzerland) Björn Jungen	0	1	0	X	X	X	X	X	1

Sheet 2	1	2	3	4	5	6	7	8	Final
(Sweden) Daniel Magnusson	0	0	2	0	2	2	0	X	6
(Switzerland) Dean Hürlimann	0	1	0	1	0	0	1	X	3

Sheet 3	1	2	3	4	5	6	7	8	Final
(Switzerland) Noé Traub	0	2	0	2	0	1	2	X	7
(Norway) Magnus Nedregotten	0	0	1	0	1	0	0	X	2

Sheet 4	1	2	3	4	5	6	7	8	Final
(Sweden) Niklas Edin	2	2	2	4	X	X	X	X	10
(Switzerland) Irene Schori	0	0	0	0	X	X	X	X	0

=== Draw 8 ===
Saturday, August 21, 10:30 am

Sheet 1	1	2	3	4	5	6	7	8	Final
(Switzerland) Jannis Bannwart	0	0	0	1	0	1	0	X	2
(Switzerland) Marco Hösli	0	2	0	0	2	0	2	X	6

Sheet 2	1	2	3	4	5	6	7	8	Final
(Norway) Magnus Ramsfjell	0	1	0	1	0	2	X	X	4
(Italy) Joël Retornaz	2	0	2	0	3	0	2	X	9

Sheet 3	1	2	3	4	5	6	7	8	Final
(Switzerland) Andrin Schnider	0	2	0	0	2	0	1	2	7
(Sweden) Anna Hasselborg	0	0	0	1	0	3	0	0	4

Sheet 4	1	2	3	4	5	6	7	8	Final
(Switzerland) Yannick Schwaller	1	1	1	1	0	3	X	X	7
(Switzerland) Yves Stocker	0	0	0	0	2	0	X	X	2

=== Draw 9 ===
Saturday, August 21, 1:45 pm

Sheet 1	1	2	3	4	5	6	7	8	Final
(Norway) Steffen Walstad	0	3	0	0	3	1	X	X	7
(Sweden) Daniel Magnusson	1	0	0	1	0	0	X	X	2

Sheet 2	1	2	3	4	5	6	7	8	Final
(Sweden) Niklas Edin	1	0	3	1	0	1	0	X	6
(Norway) Magnus Nedregotten	0	1	0	0	3	0	1	X	5

Sheet 3	1	2	3	4	5	6	7	8	Final
(Switzerland) Peter de Cruz	0	2	1	0	1	0	0	1	5
(Switzerland) Dean Hürlimann	0	0	0	1	0	2	0	0	3

Sheet 4	1	2	3	4	5	6	7	8	Final
(Germany) Sixten Totzek	2	0	2	0	2	1	0	1	8
(Switzerland) Noé Traub	0	2	0	2	0	0	3	0	7

=== Draw 10 ===
Saturday, August 21, 4:15 pm

Sheet 1	1	2	3	4	5	6	7	8	Final
(Netherlands) Jaap van Dorp	0	0	0	0	0	0	1	X	1
(Norway) Magnus Ramsfjell	0	0	1	1	1	2	0	X	5

Sheet 2	1	2	3	4	5	6	7	8	Final
(Switzerland) Yannick Schwaller	0	4	2	1	X	X	X	X	7
(Sweden) Anna Hasselborg	0	0	0	0	X	X	X	X	0

Sheet 3	1	2	3	4	5	6	7	8	Final
(Switzerland) Jannis Bannwart	0	1	0	0	0	0	X	X	1
(Italy) Joël Retornaz	2	0	0	2	1	1	X	X	6

Sheet 4	1	2	3	4	5	6	7	8	Final
(Czech Republic) Lukáš Klíma	0	1	1	0	0	3	0	0	5
(Switzerland) Andrin Schnider	2	0	0	1	1	0	1	2	7

== Playoffs ==
Quarterfinals
1	(Switzerland) Peter de Cruz	5
8	(Switzerland) Noé Traub	3
4	(Italy) Joël Retornaz	4
5	(Norway) Steffen Walstad	5
2	(Switzerland) Yannick Schwaller	7
7	(Switzerland) Yves Stocker	2
3	(Sweden) Niklas Edin	6
6	(Norway) Magnus Ramsfjell	2

Semifinals
1	(Switzerland) Peter de Cruz	5
5	(Norway) Steffen Walstad	3
2	(Switzerland) Yannick Schwaller	5
3	(Sweden) Niklas Edin	4

Final
1	(Switzerland) Peter de Cruz	3
2	(Switzerland) Yannick Schwaller	6

=== Quarterfinals ===
Saturday, August 21, 8:30 pm

Sheet 1	1	2	3	4	5	6	7	8	Final
(Switzerland) Yannick Schwaller	0	0	1	0	3	0	3	X	7
(Switzerland) Yves Stocker	0	0	0	1	0	1	0	X	2

Sheet 2	1	2	3	4	5	6	7	8	Final
(Italy) Joël Retornaz	0	0	2	0	1	0	1	0	4
(Norway) Steffen Walstad	0	1	0	1	0	1	0	2	5

Sheet 3	1	2	3	4	5	6	7	8	Final
(Sweden) Niklas Edin	1	0	1	2	0	1	1	X	6
(Norway) Magnus Ramsfjell	0	1	0	0	1	0	0	X	2

Sheet 4	1	2	3	4	5	6	7	8	Final
(Switzerland) Peter de Cruz	0	0	0	1	3	0	0	1	5
(Switzerland) Noé Traub	0	0	1	0	0	2	0	0	3

=== Semifinals ===
Sunday, August 22, 9:00 am

Sheet 2	1	2	3	4	5	6	7	8	Final
(Switzerland) Peter de Cruz	1	0	0	2	0	1	0	1	5
(Norway) Steffen Walstad	0	1	0	0	1	0	1	0	3

Sheet 3	1	2	3	4	5	6	7	8	9	Final
(Switzerland) Yannick Schwaller	0	1	0	1	0	1	1	0	1	5
(Sweden) Niklas Edin	1	0	0	0	2	0	0	1	0	4

=== Final ===
Sunday, August 22, 1:30 pm

Sheet 2	1	2	3	4	5	6	7	8	Final
(Switzerland) Peter de Cruz	0	0	2	0	0	1	0	X	3
(Switzerland) Yannick Schwaller	0	3	0	0	2	0	1	X	6
