= Aberdeen International Curling Championship =

World Curling Tour event

The Aberdeen International Curling Championship is an annual bonspiel, or curling tournament, that takes place at the Curl Aberdeen in Aberdeen, Scotland. The tournament is a Triple Knockout format. The tournament was started in 2016 as part of the World Curling Tour.

== Past champions ==
Only skip's name is displayed.

Year	Winning team	Runner up team	Purse (GBP)
2016	(Scotland) David Murdoch	(Scotland) Tom Brewster	£13,500
2017	(Scotland) Grant Hardie	(China) Liu Rui	£13,900
2018	(Scotland) Bruce Mouat	(Switzerland) Yannick Schwaller	£13,240
2019	(Switzerland) Peter de Cruz	(Norway) Steffen Walstad	£10,800
2020	(Switzerland) Yannick Schwaller	(Scotland) Ross Paterson	£9,100
2022	(Germany) Sixten Totzek	(Italy) Joël Retornaz	£9,100
2023	(Scotland) Ross Whyte	(Italy) Joël Retornaz	£6,000
2024	(Scotland) Bruce Mouat	(United States) John Shuster	£6,000
2025	(Scotland) Cameron Bryce	(Scotland) James Craik	£6,000
