= Reto Keller =

Swiss curler (born 1994)

Medal record

Curling

Representing Switzerland

World Junior Championships
Gold medal – first place	2014 Flims	
Silver medal – second place	2015 Tallinn	

Reto Keller (born 4 June 1994 in Münsingen) is a Swiss curler from Bern.

Keller threw fourth stones for the Swiss junior team (skipped by Yannick Schwaller) at the 2014 World Junior Curling Championships, winning a gold medal. Keller was invited to be the alternate on the Swiss team at the 2015 World Junior Curling Championships. The team won a silver medal, though Keller didn't play in any matches.

In 2014, Keller joined the Pfister rink. The team played in a number of World Curling Tour events, and would win the Swiss Men's Curling Championship in 2015. They represented Switzerland at the 2015 Ford World Men's Curling Championship, finishing in 7th place.
