= Sven Michel (curler) =

Swiss curler (born 1988)

- Curler
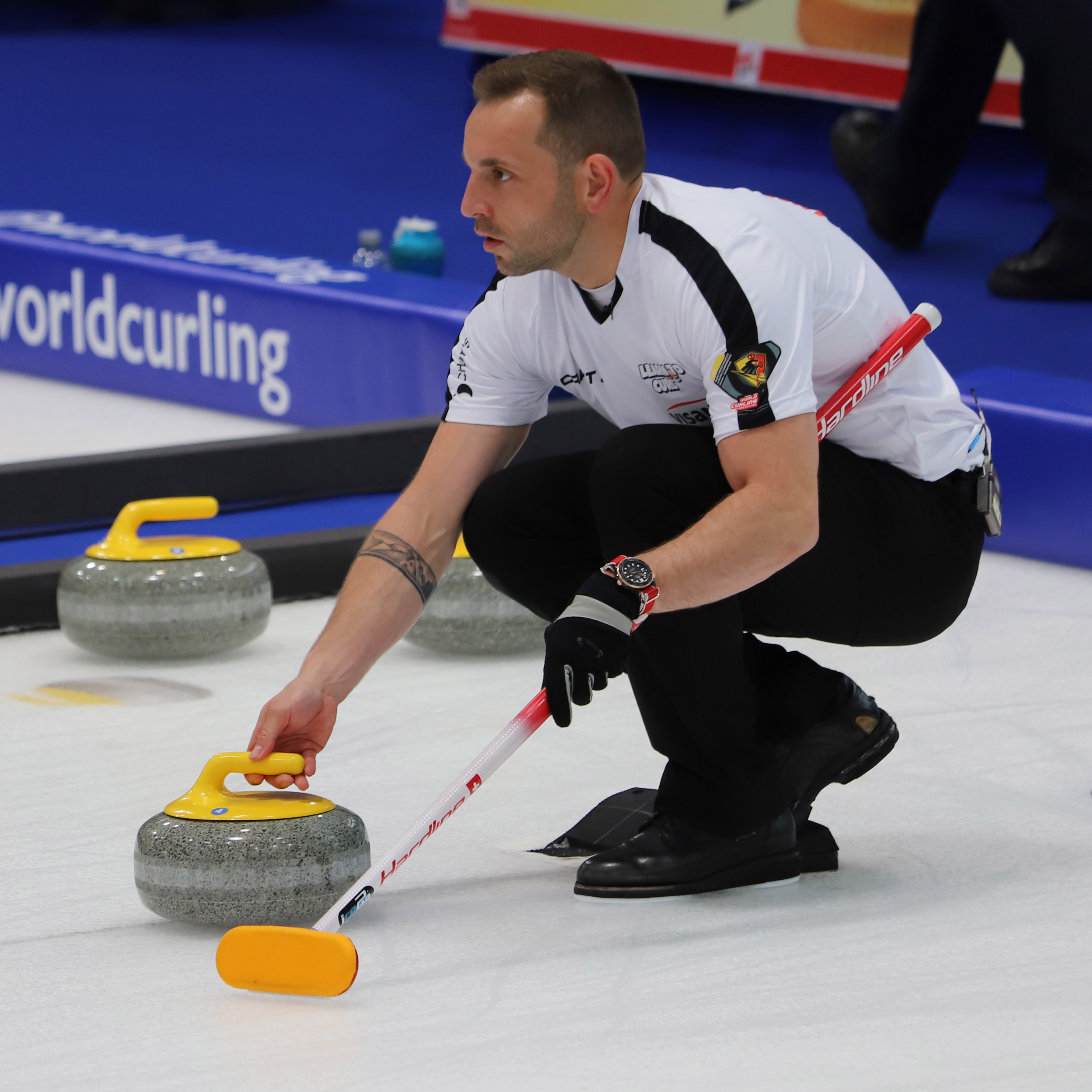
- Born: 30 March 1988 (age 38); Brienz, Switzerland

Team
- Curling club: CC Genève, Geneva, SUI
- Skip: Yannick Schwaller
- Fourth: Benoît Schwarz-van Berkel
- Second: Sven Michel
- Lead: Pablo Lachat-Couchepin
- Alternate: Kim Schwaller
- Mixed doubles partner: Alina Pätz

Curling career
- Member Association: Switzerland
- World Championship: 9 (2011, 2013, 2015, 2016, 2019, 2021, 2023, 2024, 2025)
- World Mixed Doubles Championship: 4 (2011, 2018, 2022, 2025)
- European Championship: 10 (2011, 2012, 2013, 2014, 2018, 2021, 2022, 2023, 2024, 2025)
- Olympic: 3 (2014, 2022, 2026)
- Other appearances: European Mixed: 1 (2010); World Juniors: 2 (2006, 2007)
- Grand Slam victories: 2 (2025 Canadian Open, 2026 Invitational)
Medal record
Men's curling
Representing Switzerland
Olympic Games
Bronze medal – third place	2026 Milano Cortina	Team
World Championships
Silver medal – second place	2025 Moose Jaw
Bronze medal – third place	2019 Lethbridge
Bronze medal – third place	2021 Calgary
Bronze medal – third place	2023 Ottawa
European Championships
Gold medal – first place	2013 Stavanger
Silver medal – second place	2022 Östersund
Silver medal – second place	2025 Lohja
Bronze medal – third place	2014 Champéry
Bronze medal – third place	2023 Aberdeen
World Mixed Doubles Championship
Gold medal – first place	2011 St. Paul
Gold medal – first place	2018 Östersund
Silver medal – second place	2022 Geneva
European Mixed Championship
Silver medal – second place	2010 Howwood
World Junior Championships
Bronze medal – third place	2007 Eveleth

Sven Michel (born 30 March 1988) is a Swiss curler from Matten. He is the 2026 Winter Olympics bronze medalist in men's team event, two-time World Champion in mixed doubles, and a European Men's Champion. Michel has also represented Switzerland at the 2014 and 2022 Winter Olympics.

== Career ==
=== Juniors ===
As a junior curler, Michel would represent Switzerland at the 2006 and 2007 World Junior Curling Championships, playing third for Christian von Gunten. Michel would win a bronze medal at the 2007 World Juniors, beating Denmark's Rasmus Stjerne 7–6 in the bronze medal game in an extra end.

=== Men's ===
==== Team Michel (2011–2016) ====
Michel won his first World Curling Tour event in September 2011 when he skipped his team that won the 2011 Baden Masters. Michel would make his international men's debut as an alternate for the Christof Schwaller rink at the 2011 World Men's Curling Championship, where the Swiss team would finish in 7th place, with a 6–5 record. Michel's rink of Claudio Pätz, Sandro Trolliet, and Simon Gempeler would be chosen to represent Switzerland at the 2011 European Curling Championships. At the European's, the Swiss team finished 6th with a 5–4 record. However, the Michel rink would lose the 2012 Swiss Men's Championship to Jan Hauser, failing to qualify for the 2012 World Championships.

Michel's rink would again be selected by the Swiss Curling Association to represent Switzerland at the 2012 European Curling Championships, where they would again finish 6th with an identical 5–4 record as the previous European's. However, Michel's rink would win the 2013 Swiss Men's Championship, qualifying them to represent Switzerland at the 2013 World Men's Curling Championship. At the worlds, Michel's rink would finish in 7th with a 6–5 record. Michel's rink would represent Switzerland again at the 2013 European Curling Championship, where Michel would win his first European Championship, winning against Norway's Thomas Ulsrud 8–6 in the final. Michel's success led his rink to be selected by the Swiss Curling Association to represent the country at the 2014 Winter Olympics, where the team went 3–6 in the round robin, finishing 8th.

Michel would create a new team in 2015, alongside Gempeler, as well as brothers Marc Pfister and Enrico Pfister. They would qualify and play in three Grand Slams, missing the playoffs in all of them. Michel would skip the Swiss team at the 2016 World Men's Curling Championship. At the 2016 Worlds, the team had a disappointing tournament, going 4–7 and finishing 9th. After the season, Michel announced he would be parting ways with the team.

==== Team de Cruz (2018–2022) ====
After taking a break from competitive curling, at the beginning of the 2018–19 season, Michel announced he would be joining the Peter de Cruz team, alongside Benoît Schwarz-van Berkel and Valentin Tanner. de Cruz would be skip but throw second rocks, Schwarz-van Berkel throwing fourth rocks, Michel throwing third rocks, and Tanner playing lead. At the 2018 European Curling Championships, the new de Cruz team would finish 6th, completing the round robin with a 5–4 record. The new de Cruz team would also go on to beat Yannick Schwaller in the final of the 2019 Swiss Men's Curling Championship, qualifying de Cruz to represent Switzerland at the 2019 World Men's Curling Championship. At the 2019 World Championship, they had a strong showing, winning bronze after beating Japan's Yuta Matsumura 8–4 in the bronze medal game.

After the World Championships were cancelled in 2020 due to the COVID-19 pandemic, the de Cruz rink would return to represent Switzerland at the 2021 World Men's Curling Championship, once again winning a bronze medal, beating RCF's Sergey Glukhov 6–5 in the bronze medal game. Team de Cruz would represent Switzerland at the 2021 European Curling Championships, where they would finish 5th, finishing round robin play with a 5–4 record. de Cruz would also win the 2021 Swiss Olympic curling trials, and be selected to represent Switzerland at the 2022 Winter Olympics, Michel's second Olympics. At the 2022 Olympics, the Swiss would finish in 7th place with a 4–5 record.

==== Team Schwaller (2022–present) ====
In April 2022, it was announced that Schwarz-van Berkel and Michel would be joining a new team skipped by Yannick Schwaller and Pablo Lachat for the 2022–23 season. Schwaller would skip the team but throw third rocks with Schwarz-van Berkel throwing fourth rocks, Michel playing second, and Lachat at lead. The new Schwaller rink would represent Switzerland at the 2022 European Curling Championships, where they would go 8–1 in the round robin, but lose to Scotland's Bruce Mouat 5–4 in the final, winning the silver medal. Schwaller would go on to represent Switzerland at the 2023 World Men's Curling Championship, where they would win a bronze medal, beating Italy's Joël Retornaz 11–3 in the bronze medal game. Schwaller would again represent Switzerland at the 2023 European Curling Championships, once again winning a bronze medal over Italy's Retornaz, this time by a score of 8–4 in the bronze medal game. At the 2024 World Men's Curling Championship, the Swiss team would finish a disappointing 7th, going 6–6 in round robin play. However, Schwaller would have a strong season on the Grand Slam of Curling tour, finishing in the semifinals of both the 2023 National and 2023 Masters.

Schwaller would again have a strong start to the 2024–25 curling season. At the Grand Slam events, Schwaller would finish in the quarterfinals of the 2024 Tour Challenge and semifinalists at the 2024 Canadian Open. At the 2024 European Curling Championships, the team would finish 4th, losing to Norway's Magnus Ramsfjell in the bronze medal game. The Schwaller rink would return to the 2025 World Men's Curling Championship, where they would go 9–3 in the round robin, but lose in the final to Scotland's Mouat 5–4, finishing in second and winning the silver medal.

=== Mixed doubles ===
Michel played with partner Alina Pätz at the 2011 World Mixed Doubles Curling Championship, where they won the World Championship, beating Russia's Alexey Tselousov and Alina Kovaleva 11–2 in the final. Michel would also represent Switzerland with Michèle Jäggi at the 2018 World Mixed Doubles Curling Championship, where they would also win the gold medal, beating the Russian duo of Maria Komarova and Daniil Goriachev 9–6 in the final.

Michel and Pätz returned to mixed doubles in 2022, where they represented Switzerland on home soil in Geneva at the 2022 World Mixed Doubles Curling Championship. Michel and Pǎtz would again have a strong championship, but would lose in the final 9–7 to Scotland's Eve Muirhead and Bobby Lammie. Michel and Pätz will represent Switzerland again at the 2025 World Mixed Doubles Curling Championship.

== Personal life ==
Michel is employed as a bricklayer. He is in a relationship with fellow curler Alina Pätz.

== Grand Slam record ==
Key
C	Champion
F	Lost in Final
SF	Lost in Semifinal
QF	Lost in Quarterfinals
R16	Lost in the round of 16
Q	Did not advance to playoffs
T2	Played in Tier 2 event
DNP	Did not participate in event
N/A	Not a Grand Slam event that season

Event	2012–13	2013–14	2014–15	2015–16	2016–17	2017–18	2018–19	2019–20	2020–21	2021–22	2022–23	2023–24	2024–25	2025–26	2026–27
Invitational	N/A	N/A	N/A	Q	DNP	DNP	SF	Q	N/A	N/A	QF	QF	QF	QF	C
Masters	Q	Q	QF	DNP	DNP	DNP	DNP	Q	N/A	Q	QF	SF	QF	QF	SF
National	Q	SF	DNP	Q	DNP	DNP	Q	QF	N/A	SF	Q	SF	Q	SF	F
Open	DNP	DNP	Q	Q	DNP	DNP	Q	Q	N/A	N/A	QF	QF	SF	C	
Players'	DNP	Q	Q	DNP	DNP	DNP	DNP	N/A	Q	DNP	F	Q	F	SF	
Champions Cup	N/A	N/A	N/A	DNP	DNP	DNP	DNP	DNP	Q	DNP	DNP	N/A	N/A	N/A	N/A
Elite 10	N/A	N/A	Q	DNP	DNP	DNP	DNP	N/A	N/A	N/A	N/A	N/A	N/A	N/A	N/A
