= 2017 Masters of Curling =

Grand Slam of Curling event

- Host city: Lloydminster, Saskatchewan
- Arena: Lloydminster Centennial Civic Centre
- Dates: October 24–29
- Men's winner: (Newfoundland and Labrador) Brad Gushue
- Curling club: Bally Haly G&CC, St. John's, NL
- Skip: Brad Gushue
- Third: Mark Nichols
- Second: Brett Gallant
- Lead: Geoff Walker
- Finalist: (Sweden) Niklas Edin
- Women's winner: (Manitoba) Jennifer Jones
- Curling club: St. Vital CC, Winnipeg, MB
- Skip: Jennifer Jones
- Third: Kaitlyn Lawes
- Second: Jill Officer
- Lead: Dawn McEwen
- Finalist: (Manitoba) Kerri Einarson

The 2017 Masters of Curling was held from October 24 to 29, at the Lloydminster Centennial Civic Centre in Lloydminster, Saskatchewan. This was the second Grand Slam and first major of the 2017–18 curling season.

== Qualification ==
The top 14 men's and women's teams on the World Curling Tour order of merit standing as of September 19, 2017, qualified for the event, along with the winners of the 2017 GSOC Tour Challenge Tier 2 event (Jason Gunnlaugson and Kerri Einarson respectively). One team, the Steffen Walstad rink from Norway declined their invitation and were replaced with the next best team on the WCT OOM ranking (Pat Simmons).

== Men ==
=== Teams ===
Skip	Third	Second	Lead	Locale
Reid Carruthers	Braeden Moskowy	Derek Samagalski	Colin Hodgson	Winnipeg, Manitoba
Benoît Schwarz (Fourth)	Claudio Pätz	Peter de Cruz (Skip)	Valentin Tanner	Geneva, Switzerland
Niklas Edin	Oskar Eriksson	Rasmus Wranå	Christoffer Sundgren	Karlstad, Sweden
John Epping	Mat Camm	Patrick Janssen	Tim March	Toronto, Ontario
Jason Gunnlaugson	Alex Forrest	Ian McMillan	Connor Njegovan	Winnipeg, Manitoba
Brad Gushue	Mark Nichols	Brett Gallant	Geoff Walker	St. John's, Newfoundland and Labrador
Brad Jacobs	Ryan Fry	E. J. Harnden	Ryan Harnden	Sault Ste. Marie, Ontario
Kevin Koe	Marc Kennedy	Brent Laing	Ben Hebert	Calgary, Alberta
Steve Laycock	Kirk Muyres	Matt Dunstone	Dallan Muyres	Saskatoon, Saskatchewan
Mike McEwen	B. J. Neufeld	Matt Wozniak	Denni Neufeld	Winnipeg, Manitoba
Jim Cotter (Fourth)	John Morris (Skip)	Catlin Schneider	Tyrel Griffith	Vernon, British Columbia
John Shuster	Tyler George	Matt Hamilton	John Landsteiner	(United States) Duluth, Minnesota
Pat Simmons	Colton Lott	Kyle Doering	Rob Gordon	Winnipeg, Manitoba
Kyle Smith	Thomas Muirhead	Kyle Waddell	Cammy Smith	Stirling, Scotland
Thomas Ulsrud	Torger Nergård	Christoffer Svae	Håvard Vad Petersson	Oslo, Norway

=== Round-robin standings ===
Final Standings

Key
Teams to Playoffs
Teams to Tiebreakers

Pool A	W	L	PF	PA
(Alberta) Kevin Koe	4	0	27	9
(Sweden) Niklas Edin	3	1	21	15
(Manitoba) Jason Gunnlaugson	2	2	21	24
(Ontario) John Epping	1	3	17	23
(British Columbia) John Morris	0	4	11	26

Pool B	W	L	PF	PA
(Newfoundland and Labrador) Brad Gushue	4	0	27	20
(Norway) Thomas Ulsrud	2	2	17	22
(Manitoba) Mike McEwen	2	2	20	14
(Scotland) Kyle Smith	1	3	21	20
(United States) John Shuster	1	3	15	27

Pool C	W	L	PF	PA
(Ontario) Brad Jacobs	4	0	24	11
(Manitoba) Reid Carruthers	3	1	26	20
(Switzerland) Peter de Cruz	2	2	19	18
(Saskatchewan) Steve Laycock	1	3	15	26
(Manitoba) Pat Simmons	0	4	16	25

==== Tiebreaker ====
Friday, Oct 27, 8:00pm

Sheet A	1	2	3	4	5	6	7	8	Final
(Manitoba) Mike McEwen 🔨	2	0	1	0	5	X	X	X	8
(Norway) Thomas Ulsrud	0	1	0	1	0	X	X	X	2

==== Playoffs ====
Quarterfinals
1	(Ontario) Brad Jacobs	3
8	(Manitoba) Mike McEwen	6
4	(Sweden) Niklas Edin	4
5	(Manitoba) Reid Carruthers	3
2	(Alberta) Kevin Koe	8
7	(Manitoba) Jason Gunnlaugson	2
3	(Newfoundland and Labrador) Brad Gushue	6
6	(Switzerland) Peter de Cruz	3

Semifinals
8	(Manitoba) Mike McEwen	2
4	(Sweden) Niklas Edin	4
2	(Alberta) Kevin Koe	1
3	(Newfoundland and Labrador) Brad Gushue	6

Final
4	(Sweden) Niklas Edin	4
3	(Newfoundland and Labrador) Brad Gushue	8

===== Quarterfinals =====
Saturday, Oct 28, 3:00pm

Sheet A	1	2	3	4	5	6	7	8	Final
(Ontario) Brad Jacobs 🔨	0	1	0	0	0	1	1	0	3
(Manitoba) Mike McEwen	1	0	0	1	1	0	0	3	6

Sheet B	1	2	3	4	5	6	7	8	Final
(Sweden) Niklas Edin 🔨	1	0	1	1	0	0	0	1	4
(Manitoba) Reid Carruthers	0	1	0	0	2	0	0	0	3

Sheet C	1	2	3	4	5	6	7	8	Final
(Alberta) Kevin Koe 🔨	0	2	0	0	0	0	6	X	8
(Manitoba) Jason Gunnlaugson	1	0	0	0	1	0	0	X	2

Sheet D	1	2	3	4	5	6	7	8	Final
(Newfoundland and Labrador) Brad Gushue 🔨	2	0	1	0	2	0	3	X	8
(Switzerland) Peter de Cruz	0	0	0	1	0	2	0	X	3

===== Semifinals =====
Saturday, Oct 28, 7:00pm

Sheet A	1	2	3	4	5	6	7	8	Final
(Manitoba) Mike McEwen	0	1	0	0	1	0	0	0	2
(Sweden) Niklas Edin 🔨	0	0	0	3	0	0	0	1	4

Sheet B	1	2	3	4	5	6	7	8	Final
(Alberta) Kevin Koe	0	0	1	0	0	0	X	X	1
(Newfoundland and Labrador) Brad Gushue 🔨	3	1	0	0	2	1	X	X	7

===== Final =====
Sunday, Oct 29, 11:00am

Sheet B	1	2	3	4	5	6	7	8	Final
(Sweden) Niklas Edin	0	1	0	1	0	2	0	X	4
(Newfoundland and Labrador) Brad Gushue 🔨	1	0	2	0	3	0	2	X	8

== Women ==
=== Teams ===
Skip	Third	Second	Lead	Locale
Kerri Einarson	Selena Kaatz	Liz Fyfe	Kristin MacCuish	Winnipeg, Manitoba
Michelle Englot	Kate Cameron	Leslie Wilson-Westcott	Raunora Westcott	Winnipeg, Manitoba
Allison Flaxey	Clancy Grandy	Lynn Kreviazuk	Alison Kreviazuk; Morgan Court	Caledon, Ontario
Jacqueline Harrison	Janet Murphy	Stephanie Matheson	Melissa Foster	Mississauga, Ontario
Anna Hasselborg	Sara McManus	Agnes Knochenhauer	Sofia Mabergs	Sundbyberg, Sweden
Rachel Homan	Emma Miskew	Joanne Courtney	Lisa Weagle	Ottawa, Ontario
Jennifer Jones	Kaitlyn Lawes	Jill Officer	Dawn McEwen	Winnipeg, Manitoba
Sherry Middaugh	Jo-Ann Rizzo	Kim Tuck (Note: Tuck replaced regular second Lee Merklinger.)	Leigh Armstrong	Coldwater, Ontario
Eve Muirhead	Anna Sloan	Vicki Adams	Lauren Gray	Stirling, Scotland
Alina Pätz	Nadine Lehmann	Marisa Winkelhausen	Nicole Schwägli	Zürich, Switzerland
Casey Scheidegger	Cary-Anne McTaggart	Jessie Scheidegger	Kristie Moore	Lethbridge, Alberta
Anna Sidorova	Margarita Fomina	Alexandra Raeva	Nkeiruka Ezekh; Alina Kovaleva	Moscow, Russia
Jamie Sinclair	Alexandra Carlson	Vicky Persinger	Monica Walker	(United States) Blaine, Minnesota
Val Sweeting	Lori Olson-Johns	Dana Ferguson	Rachelle Brown	Edmonton, Alberta
Silvana Tirinzoni	Manuela Siegrist	Esther Neuenschwander	Marlene Albrecht	Aarau, Switzerland

=== Round-robin standings ===
Key
Teams to Playoffs
Teams to Tiebreakers

Pool A	W	L	PF	PA
(Scotland) Eve Muirhead	3	1	27	24
(Sweden) Anna Hasselborg	3	1	26	22
(Russia) Anna Sidorova	2	2	24	22
(United States) Jamie Sinclair	2	2	18	18
(Ontario) Allison Flaxey	0	4	18	27

Pool B	W	L	PF	PA
(Manitoba) Kerri Einarson	4	0	29	10
(Alberta) Casey Scheidegger	3	1	24	19
(Manitoba) Michelle Englot	1	3	14	26
(Alberta) Val Sweeting	1	3	17	23
(Ontario) Rachel Homan	1	3	15	21

Pool C	W	L	PF	PA
(Manitoba) Jennifer Jones	4	0	33	13
(Switzerland) Alina Pätz	3	1	26	22
(Switzerland) Silvana Tirinzoni	2	2	24	19
(Ontario) Jacqueline Harrison	1	3	18	28
(Ontario) Sherry Middaugh	0	4	11	30

==== Tiebreaker ====
Friday, Oct 27, 8:00pm

Sheet B	1	2	3	4	5	6	7	8	Final
(Russia) Anna Sidorova 🔨	2	0	1	0	0	1	0	X	4
(United States) Jamie Sinclair	0	1	0	2	2	0	3	X	8

==== Playoffs ====
Quarterfinals
1	(Manitoba) Jennifer Jones	5
8	(United States) Jamie Sinclair	4
4	(Alberta) Casey Scheidegger	1
5	(Sweden) Anna Hasselborg	6
2	(Manitoba) Kerri Einarson	7
7	(Switzerland) Silvana Tirinzoni	3
3	(Scotland) Eve Muirhead	5
6	(Switzerland) Alina Pätz	4

Semifinals
1	(Manitoba) Jennifer Jones	10
5	(Sweden) Anna Hasselborg	3
2	(Manitoba) Kerri Einarson	6
3	(Scotland) Eve Muirhead	3

Final
1	(Manitoba) Jennifer Jones	6
2	(Manitoba) Kerri Einarson	5

===== Quarterfinals =====
Saturday, Oct 28, 11:00am

Sheet A	1	2	3	4	5	6	7	8	Final
(Alberta) Casey Scheidegger	0	0	1	0	0	0	0	X	1
(Sweden) Anna Hasselborg 🔨	0	1	0	0	2	2	1	X	6

Sheet B	1	2	3	4	5	6	7	8	Final
(Manitoba) Kerri Einarson 🔨	0	3	0	2	0	2	X	X	7
(Switzerland) Silvana Tirinzoni	0	0	2	0	1	0	X	X	3

Sheet C	1	2	3	4	5	6	7	8	Final
(Scotland) Eve Muirhead 🔨	1	0	0	1	0	0	2	1	5
(Switzerland) Alina Pätz	0	0	1	0	2	1	0	0	4

Sheet D	1	2	3	4	5	6	7	8	9	Final
(Manitoba) Jennifer Jones 🔨	1	1	0	0	1	0	1	0	1	5
(United States) Jamie Sinclair	0	0	1	1	0	1	0	1	0	4

===== Semifinals =====
Saturday, Oct 28, 7:00pm

Sheet C	1	2	3	4	5	6	7	8	Final
(Manitoba) Jennifer Jones 🔨	7	0	1	2	0	X	X	X	10
(Sweden) Anna Hasselborg	0	2	0	0	2	X	X	X	4

Sheet D	1	2	3	4	5	6	7	8	Final
(Manitoba) Kerri Einarson 🔨	1	0	2	0	0	2	1	X	6
(Scotland) Eve Muirhead	0	1	0	1	1	0	0	X	3

===== Final =====
Sunday, Oct 29, 11:00am

Sheet B	1	2	3	4	5	6	7	8	Final
(Manitoba) Jennifer Jones	0	2	0	0	3	1	0	0	6
(Manitoba) Kerri Einarson 🔨	1	0	1	1	0	0	1	1	5
