= Euronics European Masters =

The EURONICS European Masters was an annual bonspiel, or curling tournament, that takes place at the Sports Center Lerchenfeld in St. Gallen, Switzerland. The tournament, held as the final event of the Curling Champions Tour, started in 2013. A women's event was added in 2015. It was last held in 2017. St. Gallen would not host a World Curling Tour event again until 2022 with the creation of the St. Galler Elite Challenge.

== Past champions ==
=== Men's event ===
Year	Winning team	Runner up team	Purse (CHF)
2012	(Norway) Thomas Ulsrud, Torger Nergård, Christoffer Svae, Thomas Lovold	(Scotland) Logan Gray,^{1} Ross Paterson, Alasdair Guthrie, Richard Woods	
2013	(Sweden) Kristian Lindström, Oskar Eriksson (skip), Markus Eriksson, Christoffer Sundgren	(Switzerland) Sven Michel, Claudio Pätz, Romano Meier, Simon Gempeler	
2014	(Switzerland) Pascal Hess, Florian Meister, Meico Öhninger, Stefan Meienberg	(Scotland) Logan Gray, Grant Hardie, Ross Paterson, Richard Woods	26,000
2015	(Sweden) Niklas Edin, Oskar Eriksson, Kristian Lindström, Christoffer Sundgren	(Scotland) Kyle Smith, Grant Hardie, Kyle Waddell, Cammy Smith	26,000
2016	(Scotland) David Murdoch, Greg Drummond, Scott Andrews, Michael Goodfellow	(Sweden) Niklas Edin, Oskar Eriksson, Kristian Lindström, Christoffer Sundgren	23,800
2017	(Scotland) Kyle Smith, Thomas Muirhead, Kyle Waddell, Cammy Smith	(Sweden) Niklas Edin, Oskar Eriksson, Rasmus Wranå, Christoffer Sundgren	23,800

Notes

1. Gray skipped in place of David Murdoch, who sat out for health reasons.

=== Women's event ===
Year	Winning team	Runner up team	Purse (CHF)
2015	(Scotland) Eve Muirhead, Anna Sloan, Vicki Adams, Sarah Reid	(Switzerland) Binia Feltscher, Irene Schori, Franziska Kaufmann, Christine Urech	
2016	(Switzerland) Binia Feltscher, Irene Schori, Franziska Kaufmann, Christine Urech	(Scotland) Eve Muirhead, Vicki Adams, Nadine Lehmann, Sarah Reid	15,500
2017	(Czech Republic) Anna Kubešková, Alžběta Baudyšová, Tereza Plíšková, Klára Svatoňová	(Switzerland) Alina Pätz, Nadine Lehmann, Marisa Winkelhausen, Nicole Schwägli	15,500
