= 2017 Players' Championship =

Grand Slam of Curling event

- Host city: Toronto, Ontario
- Arena: Mattamy Athletic Centre
- Dates: April 11–16
- Men's winner: (Sweden) Niklas Edin
- Curling club: Karlstads Curlingklubb, Karlstad
- Skip: Niklas Edin
- Third: Oskar Eriksson
- Second: Rasmus Wranå
- Lead: Christoffer Sundgren
- Finalist: (Manitoba) Mike McEwen
- Women's winner: (Manitoba) Jennifer Jones
- Curling club: St. Vital Curling Club, Winnipeg
- Skip: Jennifer Jones
- Third: Kaitlyn Lawes
- Second: Jill Officer
- Lead: Dawn McEwen
- Finalist: (Alberta) Val Sweeting

The 2017 WestJet Players' Championship was held from April 11 to 16 at Ryerson's Mattamy Athletic Centre in Toronto. It was the seventh men's and sixth women's Grand Slam event of the 2016–17 curling season.

Sweden's Niklas Edin won the men's event, becoming the first non-Canadian skip to do so. On the women's side, Winnipeg's Jennifer Jones won her six Players' title, the most for any female skip.

== Qualification ==
The top 12 ranked men's and women's teams on the World Curling Tour's year to date ranking as of March 13 qualify:

=== Men's ===
Top men's teams as of March 13:

1. (Sweden) Niklas Edin
2. (Newfoundland and Labrador) Brad Gushue
3. (Manitoba) Reid Carruthers
4. (Ontario) Brad Jacobs
5. (Ontario) John Epping
6. (Manitoba) Mike McEwen
7. (Alberta) Kevin Koe
8. (Saskatchewan) Steve Laycock
9. (Scotland) Kyle Smith
10. (British Columbia) John Morris
11. (Norway) ~~Thomas Ulsrud~~ (Note: Declined invitation and was replaced by the next-ranked team (Bottcher).)
12. (Switzerland) Peter de Cruz
13. (Alberta) Brendan Bottcher

=== Women's ===
Top 12 women's teams as of March 13:

1. (Ontario) Rachel Homan
2. (Sweden) Anna Hasselborg
3. (Manitoba) Jennifer Jones
4. (Switzerland) Silvana Tirinzoni
5. (Ontario) Allison Flaxey
6. (Alberta) Val Sweeting
7. (Alberta) Casey Scheidegger
8. (Scotland) Eve Muirhead
9. (Manitoba) Michelle Englot
10. (China) Wang Bingyu
11. (Sweden) Margaretha Sigfridsson
12. (Ontario) Tracy Fleury

== Men ==
=== Teams ===
The teams are listed as follows:

Skip	Third	Second	Lead	Locale
Niklas Edin	Oskar Eriksson	Rasmus Wranå	Christoffer Sundgren	Karlstad, Sweden
Kevin Koe	Marc Kennedy	Brent Laing	Scott Pfeifer (Note: Pfeifer replaced Ben Hebert, who was injured.)	Calgary, Alberta
Mike McEwen	B. J. Neufeld	Matt Wozniak	Denni Neufeld	Winnipeg, Manitoba
Brendan Bottcher	Darren Moulding	Brad Thiessen	Karrick Martin	Edmonton, Alberta
Brad Gushue	Mark Nichols	Brett Gallant	Geoff Walker	St John's, Newfoundland and Labrador
Reid Carruthers	Braeden Moskowy	Derek Samagalski	Colin Hodgson	Winnipeg, Manitoba
Benoît Schwarz (Fourth)	Claudio Pätz	Peter de Cruz (Skip)	Valentin Tanner	Geneva, Switzerland
Jim Cotter	John Morris	Catlin Schneider (Note: Schneider replaced Rick Sawatsky, who was injured.)	Tyrel Griffith	Kelowna / Vernon, British Columbia
Brad Jacobs	Ryan Fry	E. J. Harnden	Ryan Harnden	Sault Ste. Marie, Ontario
Kyle Smith	Thomas Muirhead	Kyle Waddell	Cammy Smith	Stirling, Scotland
Steve Laycock	Kirk Muyres	Matt Dunstone	Dallan Muyres	Saskatoon, Saskatchewan
John Epping	Mat Camm	Pat Janssen	Tim March	Toronto, Ontario

=== Round-robin standings ===
Final round-robin standings

Key
Teams to Playoffs
Teams to Tiebreaker

Pool A	W	L	PF	PA	SO
(Manitoba) Mike McEwen	4	1	36	19	2
(Newfoundland and Labrador) Brad Gushue	3	2	24	17	4
(Alberta) Kevin Koe	3	2	16	22	5
(British Columbia) John Morris	2	3	26	28	3
(Manitoba) Reid Carruthers	2	3	28	19	6
(Alberta) Brendan Bottcher	1	4	19	31	11

Pool B	W	L	PF	PA	SO
(Ontario) Brad Jacobs	4	1	32	23	8
(Switzerland) Peter de Cruz	3	2	25	21	1
(Sweden) Niklas Edin	3	2	24	20	7
(Scotland) Kyle Smith	3	2	23	17	9
(Saskatchewan) Steve Laycock	2	3	18	14	10
(Ontario) John Epping	0	5	14	27	12

=== Round-robin results ===
==== Draw 1 ====
Tuesday, April 11, 7:00 pm

Sheet B	1	2	3	4	5	6	7	8	Final
(Switzerland) Peter de Cruz	0	0	2	0	0	2	0	X	4
(Saskatchewan) Steve Laycock 🔨	1	2	0	2	1	0	1	X	7

Sheet C	1	2	3	4	5	6	7	8	Final
(Scotland) Kyle Smith	1	0	2	0	1	0	4	X	8
(Ontario) John Epping 🔨	0	0	0	1	0	1	0	X	2

Sheet D	1	2	3	4	5	6	7	8	Final
(Newfoundland and Labrador) Brad Gushue 🔨	1	2	1	0	0	2	1	X	7
(Alberta) Brendan Bottcher	0	0	0	1	1	0	0	X	2

==== Draw 3 ====
Wednesday, April 12, 12:00 pm

Sheet A	1	2	3	4	5	6	7	8	Final
(Alberta) Kevin Koe 🔨	0	0	0	3	0	4	X	X	7
(British Columbia) John Morris	0	0	1	0	2	0	X	X	3

Sheet B	1	2	3	4	5	6	7	8	Final
(Ontario) Brad Jacobs	0	2	0	2	1	0	2	0	7
(Switzerland) Peter de Cruz 🔨	2	0	2	0	0	1	0	1	6

Sheet C	1	2	3	4	5	6	7	8	Final
(Sweden) Niklas Edin 🔨	3	0	1	0	3	1	X	X	8
(Scotland) Kyle Smith	0	1	0	1	0	0	X	X	2

Sheet D	1	2	3	4	5	6	7	8	Final
(Manitoba) Mike McEwen	0	0	1	1	0	0	X	X	2
(Manitoba) Reid Carruthers 🔨	1	1	0	0	4	1	X	X	7

Sheet E	1	2	3	4	5	6	7	8	Final
(Saskatchewan) Steve Laycock	0	0	0	2	0	1	0	3	6
(Ontario) John Epping 🔨	0	0	1	0	1	0	2	0	4

==== Draw 5 ====
Wednesday, April 12, 7:00 pm

Sheet A	1	2	3	4	5	6	7	8	Final
(Sweden) Niklas Edin 🔨	0	2	0	1	0	0	2	0	5
(Ontario) Brad Jacobs	1	0	2	0	2	1	0	1	7

Sheet B	1	2	3	4	5	6	7	8	Final
(Alberta) Kevin Koe	0	0	0	1	0	X	X	X	1
(Manitoba) Mike McEwen 🔨	2	1	1	0	4	X	X	X	8

Sheet C	1	2	3	4	5	6	7	8	Final
(Alberta) Brendan Bottcher 🔨	2	0	2	1	0	2	X	X	7
(Manitoba) Reid Carruthers	0	1	0	0	1	0	X	X	2

Sheet D	1	2	3	4	5	6	7	8	Final
(Newfoundland and Labrador) Brad Gushue 🔨	3	0	1	1	1	0	0	X	6
(British Columbia) John Morris	0	2	0	0	0	1	1	X	4

==== Draw 6 ====
Thursday, April 13, 8:30 am

Sheet D	1	2	3	4	5	6	7	8	Final
(Ontario) John Epping	1	0	0	3	0	0	0	0	4
(Switzerland) Peter de Cruz 🔨	0	1	1	0	1	1	1	2	7

==== Draw 7 ====
Thursday, April 13, 12:00 pm

Sheet A	1	2	3	4	5	6	7	8	Final
(Alberta) Kevin Koe 🔨	1	0	1	0	2	1	2	X	7
(Alberta) Brendan Bottcher	0	1	0	1	0	0	0	X	2

Sheet B	1	2	3	4	5	6	7	8	Final
(Newfoundland and Labrador) Brad Gushue	2	0	1	0	2	0	2	X	7
(Manitoba) Reid Carruthers 🔨	0	2	0	1	0	2	0	X	5

Sheet C	1	2	3	4	5	6	7	8	Final
(British Columbia) John Morris	0	1	0	1	1	1	0	0	4
(Manitoba) Mike McEwen 🔨	3	0	2	0	0	0	2	2	9

==== Draw 8 ====
Thursday, April 13, 3:30 pm

Sheet A	1	2	3	4	5	6	7	8	Final
(Saskatchewan) Steve Laycock	0	1	0	1	0	1	0	X	3
(Scotland) Kyle Smith 🔨	3	0	2	0	1	0	2	X	8

Sheet B	1	2	3	4	5	6	7	8	Final
(Sweden) Niklas Edin	1	0	2	0	0	0	X	X	3
(Switzerland) Peter de Cruz 🔨	0	2	0	2	1	3	X	X	8

Sheet C	1	2	3	4	5	6	7	8	Final
(Ontario) John Epping 🔨	0	2	0	1	0	1	0	0	4
(Ontario) Brad Jacobs	1	0	1	0	1	0	2	1	6

==== Draw 9 ====
Thursday, April 13, 7:00 pm

Sheet B	1	2	3	4	5	6	7	8	Final
(British Columbia) John Morris 🔨	3	0	0	0	0	5	0	X	8
(Alberta) Brendan Bottcher	0	1	2	0	1	0	1	X	5

Sheet D	1	2	3	4	5	6	7	8	Final
(Alberta) Kevin Koe 🔨	0	1	0	0	X	X	X	X	1
(Manitoba) Reid Carruthers	5	0	1	3	X	X	X	X	8

Sheet E	1	2	3	4	5	6	7	8	Final
(Newfoundland and Labrador) Brad Gushue	1	0	1	0	1	0	1	0	4
(Manitoba) Mike McEwen 🔨	0	1	0	1	0	3	0	1	6

==== Draw 10 ====
Friday, April 14, 8:30 am

Sheet A	1	2	3	4	5	6	7	8	Final
(Alberta) Brendan Bottcher	0	1	0	1	0	1	0	0	3
(Manitoba) Mike McEwen 🔨	1	0	2	0	1	0	1	2	7

Sheet C	1	2	3	4	5	6	7	8	Final
(Sweden) Niklas Edin	0	4	0	1	0	1	0	0	6
(Saskatchewan) Steve Laycock 🔨	1	0	1	0	1	0	1	1	5

Sheet E	1	2	3	4	5	6	7	8	Final
(Ontario) Brad Jacobs	0	1	0	1	1	0	1	0	4
(Scotland) Kyle Smith 🔨	2	0	1	0	0	1	0	1	5

==== Draw 11 ====
Friday, April 14, 12:00 pm

Sheet E	1	2	3	4	5	6	7	8	Final
(Manitoba) Reid Carruthers	0	0	0	1	0	2	0	X	3
(British Columbia) John Morris	0	4	1	0	1	0	1	X	7

==== Draw 12 ====
Friday, April 14, 3:30 pm

Sheet A	1	2	3	4	5	6	7	8	9	Final
(Switzerland) Peter de Cruz	1	0	2	1	1	0	1	0	2	8
(Scotland) Kyle Smith 🔨	0	2	0	0	0	1	0	3	0	6

Sheet B	1	2	3	4	5	6	7	8	Final
(Ontario) Brad Jacobs 🔨	4	1	0	1	0	2	X	X	8
(Saskatchewan) Steve Laycock	0	0	1	0	2	0	X	X	3

Sheet C	1	2	3	4	5	6	7	8	Final
(Alberta) Kevin Koe 🔨	0	2	0	0	0	1	1	X	4
(Newfoundland and Labrador) Brad Gushue	0	0	1	0	1	0	0	X	2

Sheet D	1	2	3	4	5	6	7	8	Final
(Ontario) John Epping	0	0	0	2	0	0	2	1	5
(Sweden) Niklas Edin 🔨	3	0	1	0	1	1	0	0	6

=== Tiebreaker ===
Friday, April 14, 7:00 pm

Sheet D	1	2	3	4	5	6	7	8	Final
(Manitoba) Reid Carruthers	0	4	0	2	0	5	X	X	11
(Saskatchewan) Steve Laycock 🔨	1	0	1	0	1	0	X	X	3

Player percentages
(Manitoba) Team Carruthers		(Saskatchewan) Team Laycock	
Colin Hodgson	98%	Dallan Muyres	80%
Derek Samagalski	87%	Matt Dunstone	79%
Braeden Moskowy	81%	Kirk Muyres	56%
Reid Carruthers	99%	Steve Laycock	61%
Total	69%	Total	91%

=== Tiebreaker 2 ===
Saturday, April 15, 11:00 am

Sheet C	1	2	3	4	5	6	7	8	Final
(British Columbia) John Morris	0	0	3	1	1	0	0	0	5
(Manitoba) Reid Carruthers 🔨	0	3	0	0	0	2	2	2	9

Player percentages
(British Columbia) Team Morris		(Manitoba) Team Carruthers	
Tyrel Griffith	93%	Colin Hodgson	93%
Caitlin Schneider	85%	Derek Samagalski	94%
John Morris	89%	Braeden Moskowy	91%
Jim Cotter	72%	Reid Carruthers	73%
Total	85%	Total	88%

=== Playoffs ===
Quarterfinals
1	(Manitoba) Mike McEwen	4
8	(Manitoba) Reid Carruthers	2
4	(Newfoundland and Labrador) Brad Gushue	6
5	(Alberta) Kevin Koe	1
2	(Ontario) Brad Jacobs	6
7	(Scotland) Kyle Smith	7
3	(Switzerland) Peter de Cruz	3
6	(Sweden) Niklas Edin	4

Semifinals
1	(Manitoba) Mike McEwen	5
4	(Newfoundland and Labrador) Brad Gushue	4
7	(Scotland) Kyle Smith	2
6	(Sweden) Niklas Edin	6

Final
1	(Manitoba) Mike McEwen	3
6	(Sweden) Niklas Edin	5

==== Quarterfinals ====
Saturday, April 15, 3:00 pm

Sheet B	1	2	3	4	5	6	7	8	Final
(Manitoba) Mike McEwen 🔨	0	2	0	1	0	0	1	X	4
(Manitoba) Reid Carruthers	0	0	1	0	1	0	0	X	2

Player percentages
(Manitoba) Team McEwen		(Manitoba) Team Carruthers	
Denni Neufeld	85%	Colin Hodgson	98%
Matt Wozniak	96%	Derek Samagalski	84%
B.J. Neufeld	82%	Braeden Moskowy	76%
Mike McEwen	96%	Reid Carruthers	87%
Total	90%	Total	86%

Sheet C	1	2	3	4	5	6	7	8	Final
(Newfoundland and Labrador) Brad Gushue 🔨	0	2	1	1	0	2	X	X	6
(Alberta) Kevin Koe	0	0	0	0	1	0	X	X	1

Player percentages
(Newfoundland and Labrador) Team Gushue		(Alberta) Team Koe	
Geoff Walker	100%	Scott Pfeifer	94%
Brett Gallant	88%	Brent Laing	93%
Mark Nichols	94%	Marc Kennedy	72%
Brad Gushue	95%	Kevin Koe	69%
Total	95%	Total	82%

Sheet D	1	2	3	4	5	6	7	8	Final
(Switzerland) Peter de Cruz 🔨	1	0	0	0	0	0	2	0	3
(Sweden) Niklas Edin	0	2	0	1	0	0	0	1	4

Player percentages
(Switzerland) Team de Cruz		(Sweden) Team Edin	
Valentin Tanner	93%	Christoffer Sundgren	88%
Peter de Cruz	91%	Rasmus Wranå	94%
Claudio Pätz	75%	Oskar Eriksson	95%
Benoît Schwarz	82%	Niklas Edin	96%
Total	85%	Total	93%

Sheet E	1	2	3	4	5	6	7	8	Final
(Ontario) Brad Jacobs 🔨	1	0	2	0	1	0	2	0	6
(Scotland) Kyle Smith	0	3	0	1	0	2	0	1	7

Player percentages
(Ontario) Team Jacobs		(Scotland) Team Smith	
Ryan Harnden	82%	Cammy Smith	71%
E.J. Harnden	85%	Kyle Waddell	90%
Ryan Fry	77%	Thomas Muirhead	82%
Brad Jacobs	82%	Kyle Smith	98%
Total	81%	Total	85%

==== Semifinals ====
Sunday, April 16, 11:00 am

Sheet C	1	2	3	4	5	6	7	8	Final
(Scotland) Kyle Smith	0	1	0	0	0	1	0	X	2
(Sweden) Niklas Edin 🔨	1	0	1	0	2	0	2	X	6

Player percentages
(Scotland) Team Smith		(Sweden) Team Edin	
Cammy Smith	96%	Christoffer Sundgren	80%
Kyle Waddell	76%	Rasmus Wranå	88%
Thomas Muirhead	76%	Oskar Eriksson	94%
Kyle Smith	82%	Niklas Edin	96%
Total	82%	Total	90%

Sheet D	1	2	3	4	5	6	7	8	Final
(Manitoba) Mike McEwen 🔨	0	1	0	0	0	2	0	2	5
(Newfoundland and Labrador) Brad Gushue	0	0	0	2	0	0	2	0	4

Player percentages
(Manitoba) Team McEwen		(Newfoundland and Labrador) Team Gushue	
Denni Neufeld	95%	Geoff Walker	100%
Matt Wozniak	85%	Brett Gallant	87%
B.J. Neufeld	88%	Mark Nichols	93%
Mike McEwen	100%	Brad Gushue	95%
Total	92%	Total	94%

==== Final ====
Sunday, April 16, 3:00 pm

Sheet C	1	2	3	4	5	6	7	8	Final
(Manitoba) Mike McEwen 🔨	0	2	0	0	1	0	0	0	3
(Sweden) Niklas Edin	0	0	2	0	0	1	1	1	5

Player percentages
(Manitoba) Team McEwen		(Sweden) Team Edin	
Denni Neufeld	92%	Christoffer Sundgren	92%
Matt Wozniak	82%	Rasmus Wranå	88%
B.J. Neufeld	80%	Oskar Eriksson	81%
Mike McEwen	68%	Niklas Edin	82%
Total	80%	Total	86%

== Women ==
=== Teams ===
The teams are listed as follows:

Skip	Third	Second	Lead	Locale
Wang Bingyu	Zhou Yan	Liu Jinli	Ma Jingyi (Note: Ma replaced Wang Rui.)	Harbin, China
Anna Hasselborg	Sara McManus	Agnes Knochenhauer	Sofia Mabergs	Sundbyberg, Sweden
Casey Scheidegger	Cary-Anne McTaggart	Jessie Scheidegger	Kristie Moore	Lethbridge, Alberta
Allison Flaxey	Clancy Grandy	Lynn Kreviazuk	Morgan Court	Caledon, Ontario
Cissi Östlund (Fourth)	Christina Bertrup	Maria Wennerström	Margaretha Sigfridsson (Skip)	Skellefteå, Sweden
Tracy Fleury	Crystal Webster	Jennifer Wylie	Amanda Gates	Sudbury, Ontario
Rachel Homan	Emma Miskew	Joanne Courtney	Lisa Weagle	Ottawa, Ontario
Jennifer Jones	Kaitlyn Lawes	Jill Officer	Dawn McEwen	Winnipeg, Manitoba
Eve Muirhead	Anna Sloan	Vicki Adams	Kelly Schafer (Note: Schafer replaced Lauren Gray, who was injured.)	Stirling, Scotland
Val Sweeting	Lori Olson-Johns	Dana Ferguson	Rachel Brown	Edmonton, Alberta
Silvana Tirinzoni	Cathy Overton-Clapham (Note: Overton-Clapham replaced Manuela Siegrist, who was injured.)	Esther Neuenschwander	Marlene Albrecht	Aarau, Switzerland
Michelle Englot	Kate Cameron	Leslie Wilson-Westcott	Raunora Westcott	Winnipeg, Manitoba

=== Round-robin standings ===
Final round-robin standings

Key
Teams to Playoffs
Teams to Tiebreaker

Pool A	W	L	PF	PA	SO
(Switzerland) Silvana Tirinzoni	4	1	31	18	6
(Ontario) Rachel Homan	4	1	29	23	8
(Alberta) Casey Scheidegger	3	2	33	28	4
(Ontario) Allison Flaxey	2	3	22	22	9
(China) Wang Bingyu	1	4	19	35	10
(Sweden) Margaretha Sigfridsson	1	4	29	37	11

Pool B	W	L	PF	PA	SO
(Ontario) Tracy Fleury	4	1	29	17	2
(Manitoba) Jennifer Jones	4	1	16	13	5
(Alberta) Val Sweeting	3	2	22	16	1
(Scotland) Eve Muirhead	2	3	26	26	3
(Sweden) Anna Hasselborg	2	3	14	19	7
(Manitoba) Michelle Englot	0	5	16	31	12

=== Round-robin results ===
==== Draw 1 ====
Tuesday, April 11, 7:00 pm

Sheet A	1	2	3	4	5	6	7	8	Final
(China) Wang Bingyu	0	0	1	0	2	0	0	X	3
(Ontario) Rachel Homan 🔨	1	2	0	2	0	1	0	X	6

Sheet E	1	2	3	4	5	6	7	8	Final
(Scotland) Eve Muirhead	0	1	0	2	1	0	1	0	5
(Alberta) Val Sweeting 🔨	1	0	2	0	0	2	0	1	6

==== Draw 2 ====
Wednesday, April 12, 8:30 am

Sheet A	1	2	3	4	5	6	7	8	Final
(Manitoba) Jennifer Jones 🔨	1	0	2	1	4	X	X	X	8
(Manitoba) Michelle Englot	0	1	0	0	0	X	X	X	1

Sheet B	1	2	3	4	5	6	7	8	Final
(Sweden) Anna Hasselborg	0	1	0	1	1	0	1	0	4
(Ontario) Tracy Fleury 🔨	3	0	1	0	0	2	0	1	7

Sheet C	1	2	3	4	5	6	7	8	Final
(Ontario) Allison Flaxey	0	2	0	1	4	0	0	X	7
(Sweden) Margaretha Sigfridsson 🔨	1	0	1	0	0	1	1	X	4

Sheet D	1	2	3	4	5	6	7	8	Final
(Alberta) Casey Scheidegger	2	1	0	1	0	1	0	0	5
(Switzerland) Silvana Tirinzoni 🔨	0	0	3	0	3	0	2	1	9

==== Draw 4 ====
Wednesday, April 12, 3:30 pm

Sheet A	1	2	3	4	5	6	7	8	Final
(Sweden) Margaretha Sigfridsson	0	0	3	0	0	3	0	0	6
(Alberta) Casey Scheidegger 🔨	0	3	0	2	1	0	1	1	8

Sheet B	1	2	3	4	5	6	7	8	Final
(Scotland) Eve Muirhead	1	1	2	0	0	2	1	X	7
(Manitoba) Jennifer Jones 🔨	0	0	0	2	1	0	0	X	3

Sheet C	1	2	3	4	5	6	7	8	Final
(Switzerland) Silvana Tirinzoni 🔨	2	2	0	3	3	X	X	X	10
(China) Wang Bingyu	0	0	1	0	0	X	X	X	1

Sheet D	1	2	3	4	5	6	7	8	Final
(Alberta) Val Sweeting 🔨	2	1	0	0	0	2	2	X	7
(Sweden) Anna Hasselborg	0	0	0	1	0	0	0	X	1

Sheet E	1	2	3	4	5	6	7	8	Final
(Ontario) Tracy Fleury 🔨	0	0	2	0	0	2	1	X	5
(Manitoba) Michelle Englot	0	0	0	1	0	0	0	X	1

==== Draw 5 ====
Wednesday, April 12, 7:00 pm

Sheet E	1	2	3	4	5	6	7	8	Final
(Ontario) Rachel Homan	0	2	0	1	0	4	1	X	8
(Ontario) Allison Flaxey 🔨	1	0	2	0	2	0	0	X	5

==== Draw 6 ====
Thursday, April 13, 8:30 am

Sheet A	1	2	3	4	5	6	7	8	Final
(Sweden) Anna Hasselborg	0	2	1	0	1	0	1	X	5
(Scotland) Eve Muirhead 🔨	1	0	0	1	0	0	0	X	2

Sheet B	1	2	3	4	5	6	7	8	Final
(Manitoba) Michelle Englot	0	2	0	0	0	2	0	X	4
(Alberta) Val Sweeting 🔨	2	0	2	0	2	0	1	X	7

Sheet C	1	2	3	4	5	6	7	8	Final
(Ontario) Tracy Fleury 🔨	0	0	0	2	0	2	1	0	5
(Manitoba) Jennifer Jones	0	1	1	0	2	0	0	2	6

==== Draw 7 ====
Thursday, April 13, 12:00 pm

Sheet D	1	2	3	4	5	6	7	8	9	Final
(Ontario) Allison Flaxey 🔨	0	0	0	1	0	1	0	1	0	3
(China) Wang Bingyu	0	1	1	0	0	0	1	0	1	4

Sheet E	1	2	3	4	5	6	7	8	Final
(Switzerland) Silvana Tirinzoni	0	2	0	1	0	4	1	0	8
(Sweden) Margaretha Sigfridsson 🔨	1	0	3	0	1	0	0	1	6

==== Draw 8 ====
Thursday, April 13, 3:30 pm

Sheet D	1	2	3	4	5	6	7	8	Final
(Ontario) Tracy Fleury	0	1	0	1	2	1	0	1	6
(Scotland) Eve Muirhead 🔨	1	0	1	0	0	0	2	0	4

Sheet E	1	2	3	4	5	6	7	8	Final
(Sweden) Anna Hasselborg 🔨	0	2	0	1	0	0	0	1	4
(Manitoba) Michelle Englot	0	0	0	0	1	1	1	0	3

==== Draw 9 ====
Thursday, April 13, 7:00pm

Sheet A	1	2	3	4	5	6	7	8	Final
(Switzerland) Silvana Tirinzoni	0	2	0	1	0	1	3	X	7
(Ontario) Allison Flaxey 🔨	0	0	2	0	1	0	0	X	3

Sheet C	1	2	3	4	5	6	7	8	Final
(Ontario) Rachel Homan	0	1	1	0	0	0	0	X	2
(Alberta) Casey Scheidegger🔨	1	0	0	1	3	1	1	X	7

==== Draw 10 ====
Friday, April 14, 8:30 am

Sheet B	1	2	3	4	5	6	7	8	Final
(Alberta) Casey Scheidegger 🔨	0	2	0	1	1	0	1	2	7
(China) Wang Bingyu	0	0	3	0	0	1	0	0	4

==== Draw 11 ====
Friday, April 14, 12:00 pm

Sheet A	1	2	3	4	5	6	7	8	Final
(Ontario) Rachel Homan	0	1	0	1	1	1	2	0	6
(Sweden) Margaretha Sigfridsson 🔨	1	0	3	0	0	0	0	1	5

Sheet B	1	2	3	4	5	6	7	8	Final
(Alberta) Val Sweeting	0	0	0	1	0	1	X	X	2
(Ontario) Tracy Fleury 🔨	1	1	2	0	2	0	X	X	6

Sheet C	1	2	3	4	5	6	7	8	Final
(Manitoba) Michelle Englot 🔨	0	0	3	0	2	0	1	0	6
(Scotland) Eve Muirhead	2	3	0	1	0	1	0	1	8

Sheet D	1	2	3	4	5	6	7	8	Final
(Manitoba) Jennifer Jones 🔨	2	0	1	0	3	0	4	X	10
(Sweden) Anna Hasselborg	0	1	0	1	0	3	0	X	5

==== Draw 12 ====
Friday, April 14, 3:30 pm

Sheet E	1	2	3	4	5	6	7	8	9	Final
(Ontario) Allison Flaxey 🔨	0	2	1	0	0	2	1	0	1	7
(Alberta) Casey Scheidegger	0	0	0	1	1	0	0	4	0	6

==== Draw 13 ====
Friday, April 14, 7:00 pm

Sheet B	1	2	3	4	5	6	7	8	Final
(Ontario) Rachel Homan	0	1	0	2	1	0	2	0	6
(Switzerland) Silvana Tirinzoni 🔨	1	0	1	0	0	1	0	1	4

Sheet C	1	2	3	4	5	6	7	8	Final
(Manitoba) Jennifer Jones	2	0	4	1	1	X	X	X	8
(Alberta) Val Sweeting 🔨	0	2	0	0	0	X	X	X	2

Sheet E	1	2	3	4	5	6	7	8	9	Final
(China) Wang Bingyu	0	1	0	1	1	0	4	0	0	7
(Sweden) Margaretha Sigfridsson 🔨	1	0	2	0	0	1	0	3	2	9

=== Tiebreaker ===
Saturday, April 15, 11:00 am

Sheet A	1	2	3	4	5	6	7	8	9	Final
(Sweden) Anna Hasselborg	1	0	0	2	0	1	0	0	1	5
(Ontario) Allison Flaxey 🔨	0	0	1	0	1	0	1	1	0	4

Player percentages
(Sweden) Team Hasselborg		(Ontario) Team Flaxey	
Sofia Mabergs	97%	Morgan Court	88%
Agnes Knochenhauer	95%	Lynn Kreviazuk	86%
Sara McManus	87%	Clancy Grandy	85%
Anna Hasselborg	87%	Allison Flaxey	81%
Total	91%	Total	85%

=== Playoffs ===
Quarterfinals
1	(Ontario) Tracy Fleury	5
8	(Sweden) Anna Hasselborg	6
4	(Ontario) Rachel Homan	3
5	(Alberta) Val Sweeting	4
2	(Manitoba) Jennifer Jones	6
7	(Scotland) Eve Muirhead	5
3	(Switzerland) Silvana Tirinzoni	7
6	(Alberta) Casey Scheidegger	3

Semifinals
8	(Sweden) Anna Hasselborg	5
5	(Alberta) Val Sweeting	6
2	(Manitoba) Jennifer Jones	8
3	(Switzerland) Silvana Tirinzoni	3

Final
5	(Alberta) Val Sweeting	4
2	(Manitoba) Jennifer Jones	8

==== Quarterfinals ====
Saturday, April 15, 7:30 pm

Sheet B	1	2	3	4	5	6	7	8	Final
(Switzerland) Silvana Tirinzoni 🔨	0	1	2	0	1	0	3	X	7
(Alberta) Casey Scheidegger	0	0	0	2	0	1	0	X	3

Player percentages
(Switzerland) Team Tirinzoni		(Alberta) Team Scheidegger	
Marlene Albrecht	72%	Kristie Moore	83%
Esther Neuenschwander	100%	Jessie Scheidegger	100%
Cathy Overton-Clapham	97%	Cary-Anne McTaggart	86%
Silvana Tirinzoni	83%	Casey Scheidegger	85%
Total	89%	Total	89%

Sheet C	1	2	3	4	5	6	7	8	Final
(Manitoba) Jennifer Jones 🔨	0	3	0	0	1	1	1	0	6
(Scotland) Eve Muirhead	1	0	2	1	0	0	0	1	5

Player percentages
(Manitoba) Team Jones		(Scotland) Team Muirhead	
Dawn McEwen	96%	Kelly Schafer	90%
Jill Officer	79%	Vicki Adams	93%
Kaitlyn Lawes	83%	Anna Sloan	84%
Jennifer Jones	64%	Eve Muirhead	73%
Total	80%	Total	85%

Sheet D	1	2	3	4	5	6	7	8	Final
(Ontario) Tracy Fleury 🔨	0	3	0	0	1	0	1	0	5
(Sweden) Anna Hasselborg	2	0	0	2	0	1	0	1	6

Player percentages
(Ontario) Team Fleury		(Sweden) Team Hasselborg	
Amanda Gates	84%	Sofia Mabergs	98%
Jennifer Wylie	88%	Agnes Knochenhauer	87%
Crystal Webster	86%	Sara McManus	65%
Tracy Fleury	79%	Anna Hasselborg	88%
Total	84%	Total	84%

Sheet E	1	2	3	4	5	6	7	8	9	Final
(Ontario) Rachel Homan 🔨	0	1	0	1	0	0	0	1	0	3
(Alberta) Val Sweeting	0	0	0	0	1	1	1	0	1	4

Player percentages
(Ontario) Team Homan		(Alberta) Team Sweeting	
Lisa Weagle	80%	Rachelle Brown	94%
Joanne Courtney	83%	Dana Ferguson	81%
Emma Miskew	73%	Lori Olson-Johns	75%
Rachel Homan	65%	Val Sweeting	88%
Total	75%	Total	84%

==== Semifinals ====
Sunday, April 16, 11:00 am

Sheet B	1	2	3	4	5	6	7	8	Final
(Sweden) Anna Hasselborg	0	1	0	0	4	0	0	0	5
(Alberta) Val Sweeting 🔨	0	0	2	1	0	2	0	1	6

Player percentages
(Sweden) Team Hasselborg		(Alberta) Team Sweeting	
Sofia Mabergs	87%	Rachelle Brown	91%
Agnes Knochenhauer	90%	Dana Ferguson	84%
Sara McManus	91%	Lori Olson-Johns	92%
Anna Hasselborg	74%	Val Sweeting	79%
Total	85%	Total	87%

Sheet E	1	2	3	4	5	6	7	8	Final
(Manitoba) Jennifer Jones 🔨	1	0	0	2	1	0	4	X	8
(Switzerland) Silvana Tirinzoni	0	1	0	0	0	2	0	X	3

Player percentages
(Manitoba) Team Jones		(Switzerland) Team Tirinzoni	
Dawn McEwen	88%	Marlene Albrecht	90%
Jill Officer	97%	Esther Neuenschwander	76%
Kaitlyn Lawes	76%	Cathy Overton-Clapham	82%
Jennifer Jones	85%	Silvana Tirinzoni	52%
Total	87%	Total	75%

==== Final ====
Sunday, April 16, 7:00 pm

Sheet C	1	2	3	4	5	6	7	8	Final
(Alberta) Val Sweeting	0	2	0	1	1	0	0	X	4
(Manitoba) Jennifer Jones 🔨	2	0	3	0	0	2	1	X	8

Player percentages
(Alberta) Team Sweeting		(Manitoba) Team Jones	
Rachelle Brown	93%	Dawn McEwen	93%
Dana Ferguson	78%	Jill Officer	93%
Lori Olson-Johns	74%	Kaitlyn Lawes	90%
Val Sweeting	74%	Jennifer Jones	86%
Total	80%	Total	90%
