= 2013 European Masters (curling) =

Curling tournament held in Switzerland

- Host city: St. Gallen, Switzerland
- Arena: Sports Center Lerchenfeld
- Dates: April 17–20
- Winner: (Sweden) Oskar Eriksson
- Curling club: Karlstad CK, Karlstad, Sweden
- Skip: Oskar Eriksson
- Third: Kristian Lindström
- Second: Markus Eriksson
- Lead: Christoffer Sundgren
- Finalist: (Switzerland) Sven Michel

The 2013 European Masters were held from April 17 to 20 at the Sports Center Lerchenfeld in St. Gallen, Switzerland as part of the 2012–13 World Curling Tour. It was the final event on the Curling Champions Tour (CCT) of Europe, and featured the top teams from the CCT rankings.

== Teams ==
The teams for the European Masters were invited based on their top-ten finishes in the Curling Champions Tour ranking list for the 2012–13 season, with the exception of Mark Dacey's Canadian team, who were a special invite. The top-ranked teams skipped by Niklas Edin and Thomas Ulsrud declined their invitations due to their participation in the 2013 Players' Championship, which ran at the same time as the European Masters.

The teams are listed as follows:

Skip	Third	Second	Lead	Alternate	Locale
Tom Brewster	David Murdoch	Scott Andrews	Michael Goodfellow	Greg Drummond	Aberdeen, Scotland
Mark Dacey	Stuart Thompson	Jordan Pinder	Ian Juurlink		(Canada) Halifax, Nova Scotia
Benoît Schwarz (fourth)	Peter de Cruz (skip)	Dominik Märki	Valentin Tanner		Geneva, Switzerland
Kristian Lindström (fourth)	Oskar Eriksson (skip)	Markus Eriksson	Christoffer Sundgren		Karlstad, Sweden
Mario Freiberger	Sven Iten	Pascal Eicher	Rainer Kobler		Zug, Switzerland
Marcus Hasselborg	Peder Folke	Andreas Prytz	Anton Sandström		Sweden
Sven Michel	Claudio Pätz	Sandro Trolliet	Simon Gempeler	Romano Meier	Adelboden, Switzerland
Rasmus Stjerne	Johnny Frederiksen	Mikkel Poulsen	Troels Harry	Lars Vilandt	Hvidovre, Denmark

== Round-robin standings ==
Final round-robin standings

Key
Teams to Playoffs

Pool A	W	L
(Scotland) Tom Brewster	3	0
(Switzerland) Peter de Cruz	2	1
(Sweden) Marcus Hasselborg	1	2
(Denmark) Rasmus Stjerne	0	3

Pool B	W	L
(Sweden) Oskar Eriksson	3	0
(Switzerland) Sven Michel	1	2
(Switzerland) Mario Freiberger	1	2
(Canada) Mark Dacey	1	2

== Round-robin results ==
All draw times are listed in Central European Summer Time (UTC+2).

=== Draw 1 ===
Wednesday, April 17, 15:00

Sheet A	1	2	3	4	5	6	7	8	Final
(Switzerland) Peter de Cruz	2	0	1	0	2	0	1	2	8
(Denmark) Rasmus Stjerne	0	2	0	2	0	1	0	0	5

Sheet B	1	2	3	4	5	6	7	8	Final
(Sweden) Oskar Eriksson	0	0	1	0	0	3	0	2	6
(Switzerland) Sven Michel	1	0	0	1	1	0	1	0	4

Sheet C	1	2	3	4	5	6	7	8	Final
(Sweden) Marcus Hasselborg	0	0	1	2	0	1	0	0	4
(Scotland) Tom Brewster	2	0	0	0	1	0	1	2	6

Sheet D	1	2	3	4	5	6	7	8	Final
(Switzerland) Mario Freiberger	0	0	0	0	2	0	X	X	2
(Canada) Mark Dacey	0	3	0	2	0	4	X	X	9

=== Draw 2 ===
Thursday, April 18, 13:00

Sheet A	1	2	3	4	5	6	7	8	Final
(Sweden) Oskar Eriksson	2	0	1	0	3	1	0	X	7
(Switzerland) Mario Freiberger	0	0	0	2	0	0	2	X	4

Sheet B	1	2	3	4	5	6	7	8	9	Final
(Switzerland) Sven Michel	1	0	0	1	0	2	0	0	1	5
(Canada) Mark Dacey	0	1	1	0	1	0	0	1	0	4

Sheet C	1	2	3	4	5	6	7	8	Final
(Switzerland) Peter de Cruz	1	2	0	1	1	0	1	X	6
(Sweden) Marcus Hasselborg	0	0	1	0	0	0	0	X	1

Sheet D	1	2	3	4	5	6	7	8	Final
(Denmark) Rasmus Stjerne	2	0	0	0	0	1	X	X	3
(Scotland) Tom Brewster	0	1	5	1	1	0	X	X	8

=== Draw 3 ===
Thursday, April 18, 20:00

Sheet A	1	2	3	4	5	6	7	8	Final
(Denmark) Rasmus Stjerne	0	3	0	1	0	0	X	X	4
(Sweden) Marcus Hasselborg	2	0	2	0	4	1	X	X	9

Sheet B	1	2	3	4	5	6	7	8	Final
(Sweden) Oskar Eriksson	1	1	2	0	0	1	0	1	6
(Canada) Mark Dacey	0	0	0	1	1	0	2	0	4

Sheet C	1	2	3	4	5	6	7	8	Final
(Switzerland) Peter de Cruz	0	1	0	0	0	1	0	X	2
(Scotland) Tom Brewster	1	0	1	1	1	0	2	X	6

Sheet D	1	2	3	4	5	6	7	8	Final
(Switzerland) Sven Michel	0	0	2	0	1	0	0	X	3
(Switzerland) Mario Freiberger	5	0	0	1	0	1	1	X	8

== Playoffs ==
Semifinals
A1	(Scotland) Tom Brewster	2
B2	(Switzerland) Sven Michel	5
B1	(Sweden) Oskar Eriksson	8
A2	(Switzerland) Peter de Cruz	4

Final
B2	(Switzerland) Sven Michel	3
B1	(Sweden) Oskar Eriksson	6
Bronze Medal Game
A1	(Scotland) Tom Brewster	1
A2	(Switzerland) Peter de Cruz	7

=== Semifinals ===
Friday, April 19, 13:00

Sheet C	1	2	3	4	5	6	7	8	Final
(Scotland) Tom Brewster	0	0	0	1	0	1	0	X	2
(Switzerland) Sven Michel	1	1	0	0	3	0	0	X	5

Sheet D	1	2	3	4	5	6	7	8	Final
(Sweden) Oskar Eriksson	0	2	0	0	1	0	2	3	8
(Switzerland) Peter de Cruz	1	0	1	0	0	2	0	0	4

=== Bronze medal game ===
Saturday, April 20, 19:30

Sheet B	1	2	3	4	5	6	7	8	Final
(Scotland) Tom Brewster	0	1	0	0	X	X	X	X	1
(Switzerland) Peter de Cruz	3	0	3	1	X	X	X	X	7

=== Final ===
Saturday, April 20, 19:30

Sheet C	1	2	3	4	5	6	7	8	Final
(Switzerland) Sven Michel	0	0	1	0	0	2	0	X	3
(Sweden) Oskar Eriksson	1	0	0	1	0	0	4	X	6

== Ranking games ==
Semifinals
A3	(Sweden) Marcus Hasselborg	4
B4	(Canada) Mark Dacey	7
B3	(Switzerland) Mario Freiberger	5
A4	(Denmark) Rasmus Stjerne	4

Fifth place game
B4	(Canada) Mark Dacey	6
B3	(Switzerland) Mario Freiberger	2
Seventh place game
A3	(Sweden) Marcus Hasselborg	6
A4	(Denmark) Rasmus Stjerne	5

=== Semifinals ===
Friday, April 19, 13:00

Sheet A	1	2	3	4	5	6	7	8	Final
(Sweden) Marcus Hasselborg	0	0	0	2	1	0	1	0	4
(Canada) Mark Dacey	1	2	2	0	0	1	0	1	7

Sheet B	1	2	3	4	5	6	7	8	Final
(Switzerland) Mario Freiberger	0	2	1	0	1	0	0	1	5
(Denmark) Rasmus Stjerne	0	0	0	1	0	2	1	0	4

=== Fifth place game ===
Saturday, April 20, 19:30

Sheet D	1	2	3	4	5	6	7	8	Final
(Canada) Mark Dacey	1	0	2	0	2	1	0	X	6
(Switzerland) Mario Freiberger	0	0	0	1	0	0	1	X	2

=== Seventh place game ===
Saturday, April 20, 19:30

Sheet E	1	2	3	4	5	6	7	8	Final
(Sweden) Marcus Hasselborg	0	0	1	1	0	2	0	2	6
(Denmark) Rasmus Stjerne	0	3	0	0	1	0	1	0	5
