= 2017 European Masters =

2017 European Masters can mean:

- 2017 European Masters (curling)
- 2017 European Masters (snooker)
