= 2017 European Masters (curling) =

2017 Euronics European Masters
- Host city: St. Gallen, Switzerland
- Arena: Sports Center Lerchenfeld
- Dates: April 19–22
- Men's winner: (Scotland) Team Smith
- Curling club: Royal Caledonian CC, Stirling
- Skip: Kyle Smith
- Third: Thomas Muirhead
- Second: Kyle Waddell
- Lead: Cammy Smith
- Finalist: (Sweden) Niklas Edin
- Women's winner: (Czech Republic) Team Kubešková
- Curling club: CC Sokol Liboc, Prague
- Skip: Anna Kubešková
- Third: Alžběta Baudyšova
- Second: Tereza Plíšková
- Lead: Klára Svatoňová
- Alternate: Ežen Kolčevská
- Finalist: (Switzerland) Alina Pätz

The 2017 Euronics European Masters was held from April 19–22 at the Sports Center Lerchenfeld in St. Gallen, Switzerland. It was the final event on the Curling Champions Tour (CCT) of Europe, and featured the top teams from the CCT rankings.

== Men ==
=== Teams ===
The teams are listed as follows:

Skip	Third	Second	Lead	Alternate	Locale
Tom Brewster	Glen Muirhead	Ross Paterson	Hammy McMillan Jr.		Aberdeen, Scotland
Niklas Edin	Oskar Eriksson	Rasmus Wranå	Christoffer Sundgren		Karlstad, Sweden
Heath McCormick	Chris Plys	Korey Dropkin	Thomas Howell		Blaine, United States
David Murdoch	Scott Andrews	Greg Drummond	Michael Goodfellow		Stirling, Scotland
Marc Pfister	Enrico Pfister	Raphael Märki	Simon Gempeler	Reto Keller	Adelboden, Switzerland
Kyle Smith	Thomas Muirhead	Kyle Waddell	Cammy Smith		Stirling, Scotland
Thomas Ulsrud	Torger Nergård	Christoffer Svae	Håvard Vad Petersson		Oslo, Norway
Steffen Walstad	Markus Høiberg	Kristian Lindström	Alexander Lindström		Oslo, Norway

=== Round robin standings ===
Final Round Robin Standings

Key
Teams to Playoffs
Teams to 3rd Place Game

Team	W	L
(Sweden) Niklas Edin	6	1
(Scotland) Kyle Smith	4	3
(Scotland) Tom Brewster	4	3
(United States) Heath McCormick	4	3
(Switzerland) Marc Pfister	4	3
(Norway) Thomas Ulsrud	4	3
(Scotland) David Murdoch	1	6
(Norway) Steffen Walstad	1	6

=== Playoffs ===
Final
1	(Sweden) Niklas Edin	4
2	(Scotland) Kyle Smith	5

3rd place
3	(Scotland) Tom Brewster	4
4	(United States) Heath McCormick	2

== Women ==
=== Teams ===
The teams are listed as follows:

Skip	Third	Second	Lead	Alternate	Locale
Melanie Barbezat	Briar Hürlimann	Sina Wettstein	Daniela Rupp	Janine Wyss	Biel, Switzerland
Hannah Fleming	Jennifer Dodds	Alice Spence	Vicky Wright		Lockerbie, Scotland
Anna Kubešková	Alžběta Baudyšová	Tereza Plíšková	Klára Svatoňová	Ežen Kolčevská	Prague, Czech Republic
Alina Pätz	Nadine Lehmann	Marisa Winkelhausen	Nicole Schwägli		Zürich, Switzerland
Andrea Schöpp	Ursi Hegner	Lisa Ruch	Fabienne Fürbringer		Garmisch, Germany
Karla Thompson	Kristen Recksiedler	Shannon Aleksic	Trysta Vandale		Kamloops, Canada

=== Round robin standings ===
Key
Teams to Playoffs
Teams to 3rd Place Game

Team	W	L
(Switzerland) Alina Pätz	5	0
(Czech Republic) Anna Kubešková	3	2
(Canada) Karla Thompson	2	3
(Switzerland) Melanie Barbezat	2	3
(Scotland) Hannah Fleming	2	3
(Germany) Andrea Schöpp	1	4

=== Playoffs ===
Final
1	(Switzerland) Alina Pätz	4
2	(Czech Republic) Anna Kubešková	7

3rd place
3	(Canada) Karla Thompson	6
4	(Switzerland) Melanie Barbezat	5
