= Kyle Smith (curler) =

Scottish curler (born 1992)

- Curler
- Born: 9 July 1992 (age 34); Perthshire, Scotland

Team
- Curling club: St Martin's CC, Perth, SCO

Curling career
- Member Association: Scotland; Great Britain
- European Championship: 2 (2015, 2017)
- Olympic: 1 (2018)
Medal record
Men's curling
Representing Scotland
European Curling Championships
Silver medal – second place	2017 St Gallen
World Junior Curling Championships
Gold medal – first place	2013 Sochi
Silver medal – second place	2014 Flims
Bronze medal – third place	2012 Östersund
Representing Great Britain
Winter Universiade
Silver medal – second place	2013 Trentino
Bronze medal – third place	2015 Granada

Kyle Smith (born 9 July 1992) is a Scottish retired curler from Guildtown, Perthshire. During his career, he skipped the British men's curling team at the 2018 Winter Olympics in PyeongChang, South Korea, placing fifth. He also skipped Scotland at two European Curling Championships, two Winter Universiade and three World Junior Curling Championships, winning the event in 2013.

== Career ==
=== Juniors ===
During his junior career, Smith skipped Scotland at three World Junior Curling Championships from 2012 to 2014. In 2012, the team, consisting of Thomas Muirhead, Kyle Waddell, Kerr Drummond and Hammy McMillan Jr. went 7–2 through the round robin before losing the 3 vs. 4 page playoff game to Norway's Markus Høiberg. However, they avenged this loss in the bronze medal game when they defeated the same Norwegian team to finish third. In 2013, his team, now with brother Cameron at lead instead of Drummond, topped the round robin with an 8–1 record. They then beat Canada's Matt Dunstone in the 1 vs. 2 page playoff game and then defeated Russia's Evgeny Arkhipov to secure the gold medal. It was Scotland's first time winning the event since 1996. Later in the year, Smith led Great Britain to a silver medal at the 2013 Winter Universiade (representing Scottish Agricultural College). After a 6–3 record in the round robin, they lost to Sweden's Oskar Eriksson in the final. At the 2014 World Junior Curling Championships, the team, now with Duncan Menzies at alternate instead of McMillan went 6–3 in the round robin, but were able to defeat Norway in the 1 vs. 2 game to once again qualify for the final. There, they were bested by Switzerland's Yannick Schwaller, settling for silver.

Smith skipped Scotland at the 2014 European Mixed Curling Championship with teammates Hannah Fleming, Billy Morton and Alice Spence. The team placed first in their pool after the round robin with a 6–1 record, earning a spot in the quarterfinal round where they beat Finland. They then lost in both the semifinal and bronze medal game to Norway and Switzerland respectively, settling for fourth.

In 2015, Smith again skipped the British team at the Winter Universiade. At the 2015 Winter Universiade, Smith, Grant Hardie, Muirhead, Alasdair Schreiber and Stuart Taylor, representing Scotland's Rural College, would finish with a 6–3 round robin record. This once again earned them a spot in the playoffs, where they lost to Russia's Arkhipov in the semifinal. They were, however, able to secure the bronze medal with a 7–4 victory over Sweden's Patric Mabergs.

=== Men's ===
Team Smith immediately found success on the World Curling Tour, reaching the finals of the Dumfries Curling Challenge, the Mercure Perth Masters and the European Masters during the 2014–15 season. The team competed in their first Grand Slam of Curling event at the 2015 GSOC Tour Challenge Tier 2 where they reached the semifinals. They also made the semifinals of the Swiss Cup Basel before being eliminated by the Brad Gushue rink. In October, the team won the qualifier for the 2015 European Curling Championships, defeating the Tom Brewster rink in the best-of-three final. They would go on to miss the playoffs at the Europeans after losing in a tiebreaker to Sweden's Niklas Edin. The 2015–16 season also marked Team Smith's first tour win together at the Edinburgh International where they defeated Jaap van Dorp to claim the title.

The 2016–17 season was a breakthrough season for the Smith rink, beginning at the Oakville Fall Classic where they captured the event title. They also reached the semifinals at the Stu Sells Oakville Tankard, the Swiss Cup Basel and the Red Deer Curling Classic. In Grand Slam play, the team in four events. The team's best finish came at the 2016 GSOC Tour Challenge where they made it all the way to the final before being defeated by the Edin rink. They also made the semifinals at the 2017 Players' Championship but were again eliminated by Team Edin. At the Scottish Men's Curling Championship, they finished third after losing both the 1 vs. 2 page playoff game and semifinal to the David Murdoch and Bruce Mouat rinks respectively. They ended their season at the 2017 Euronics European Masters where they beat the Edin rink in the final.

In June 2017, it was announced that British Curling had selected the Smith rink to represent Great Britain at the 2018 Winter Olympics in PyeongChang, South Korea. The team were chosen as they were the top ranked British team on the 2016–17 World Curling Tour rankings, despite having never won the Scottish Men's Championship. They were also chosen over the Murdoch, Mouat and Tom Brewster rinks, which caused controversy due to the Murdoch rink winning the 2017 Scottish Championship. However, because they missed out on the playoffs at the 2017 World Men's Curling Championship, the advantage was ultimately handed to the Smith rink.

Leading up to the 2018 Winter Olympics, the Smith rink did not have the best season on tour. They failed to make it past the quarterfinals in any of their fall events and missed the playoffs at both the 2017 GSOC Tour Challenge and the 2017 Masters. Due to their selection as the British Olympic team, they already qualified to represent Scotland at the 2017 European Curling Championships. There, the team went 6–3 through the round robin, qualifying for the playoffs. They then defeated the higher seeded Switzerland's Peter de Cruz rink before losing in the final to the Edin rink, earning the silver medal. Before the Games, they played in three more tour events, with their best finish coming at the German Masters where they lost in the final to Marc Pfister. At the Olympics, the team had mixed results throughout the round robin, ultimately finishing tied for third with a 5–4 record. This put them into a tiebreaker against the Swiss de Cruz rink, which they lost 9–5, eliminating them from contention. Immediately following the Games, the team played in a best-of-three playoff against the Mouat rink to determine who would represent Scotland at the 2018 World Men's Curling Championship, which the Mouat rink won two games to one. In their final event of the season, Team Smith reached the quarterfinals of the 2018 Players' Championship, where they once again were defeated by the Edin rink. After the season, Kyle Waddell left the team and Glen Muirhead took over skipping duties, moving Smith to third on the team.

During the 2018–19 season, Team Muirhead found success in all but one of their tour events. In November, they captured the Ashley HomeStore Curling Classic event title by defeating the Ross Paterson rink in an all-Scottish final. They also reached the final of both the Curling Masters Champéry and the Mercure Perth Masters, as well as the semifinals of the Qinghai Curling Elite. They competed in one Grand Slam, the 2018 Tour Challenge Tier 2, where they lost in the quarterfinals to the Kirk Muyres rink. At the Scottish Men's Curling Championship, they reached the final where they were defeated by the Bruce Mouat rink.

In October 2019, Team Muirhead competed in the Scottish qualifier for the 2019 European Curling Championships against both the Mouat and Paterson rinks. After going 2–2 through the round robin, they were defeated by the Paterson rink in the best-of-three final. Elsewhere on tour, they finished second at the Farmers Edge SCT and third at the Dumfries Challenger Series. At the Scottish Men's Championship, they once again placed second after losing to the Mouat rink again in the final.

Following the 2019–20 season, Team Muirhead was cut from British Curling's elite performance program.

== Personal life ==
Smith is the son of 1991 World champion David Smith and the nephew of curler Peter Smith. Smith's brother is a fellow curler Cammy Smith, who played lead on his team for the majority of his career. In addition to curling, Smith is a farmer.

== Grand Slam record ==
Key
C	Champion
F	Lost in Final
SF	Lost in Semifinal
QF	Lost in Quarterfinals
R16	Lost in the round of 16
Q	Did not advance to playoffs
T2	Played in Tier 2 event
DNP	Did not participate in event
N/A	Not a Grand Slam event that season

Event	2015–16	2016–17	2017–18	2018–19
Masters	DNP	Q	Q	DNP
Tour Challenge	T2	F	Q	T2
Canadian Open	DNP	Q	DNP	DNP
Players'	DNP	SF	QF	DNP

== Teams ==
Season	Skip	Third	Second	Lead
2011–12	Kyle Smith	Thomas Muirhead	Kyle Waddell	Kerr Drummond
2012–13	Kyle Smith	Thomas Muirhead	Kyle Waddell	Cammy Smith
2013–14	Kyle Smith	Thomas Muirhead	Kyle Waddell	Cammy Smith
2014–15	Kyle Smith	Grant Hardie	Kyle Waddell	Cammy Smith
2015–16	Kyle Smith	Thomas Muirhead	Kyle Waddell	Cammy Smith
2016–17	Kyle Smith	Thomas Muirhead	Kyle Waddell	Cammy Smith
2017–18	Kyle Smith	Thomas Muirhead	Kyle Waddell	Cammy Smith
2018–19	Glen Muirhead	Kyle Smith	Thomas Muirhead	Cammy Smith
2019–20	Glen Muirhead	Kyle Smith	Thomas Muirhead	Cammy Smith
