= 2018 Players' Championship =

Grand Slam of Curling event

- Host city: Toronto, Ontario
- Arena: Mattamy Athletic Centre
- Dates: April 10-15, 2018
- Men's winner: (Alberta) Team Koe
- Curling club: Glencoe Curling Club, Calgary
- Skip: Kevin Koe
- Third: Marc Kennedy
- Second: Brent Laing
- Lead: Ben Hebert
- Finalist: (Sweden) Niklas Edin
- Women's winner: (United States) Team Sinclair
- Curling club: St. Paul Curling Club, St. Paul
- Skip: Jamie Sinclair
- Third: Alex Carlson
- Second: Vicky Persinger
- Lead: Monica Walker
- Finalist: (Manitoba) Jennifer Jones

The 2018 Players' Championship was held from April 10 to 15, 2018 at the Mattamy Athletic Centre in Toronto, Ontario. It was the seventh men's and sixth women's Grand Slam event of the 2017–18 World Curling Tour.

On the men's side, Calgary's Kevin Koe won his first Players' Championship as a skip (he had previously won in 2004 playing third for John Morris). On the women's side, Minnesota's Jamie Sinclair rink became the first American ever team to win a Grand Slam championship.

== Qualification ==
The top 12 ranked men's and women's teams on the World Curling Tour's year to date ranking as of March 12 qualify:

=== Men's ===
Top men's teams as of March 12:

1. (Sweden) Niklas Edin
2. (Newfoundland and Labrador) Brad Gushue
3. (Alberta) Kevin Koe
4. (Manitoba) Mike McEwen
5. (Switzerland) ~~Peter de Cruz~~
6. (Ontario) Brad Jacobs
7. (Alberta) Brendan Bottcher
8. (Manitoba) Reid Carruthers
9. (Manitoba) Jason Gunnlaugson
10. (Scotland) Bruce Mouat
11. (Ontario) John Epping
12. (United States) John Shuster
13. (South Korea) ~~Kim Chang-min~~
14. (Norway) ~~Thomas Ulsrud~~
15. (China) ~~Liu Rui~~
16. (Scotland) Kyle Smith

=== Women's ===
Top 12 women's teams as of March 12:

1. (Manitoba) Jennifer Jones
2. (Sweden) Anna Hasselborg
3. (Alberta) Chelsea Carey
4. (Scotland) Eve Muirhead
5. (Ontario) Rachel Homan
6. (Manitoba) Kerri Einarson
7. (Switzerland) Silvana Tirinzoni
8. (South Korea) Kim Eun-jung
9. (United States) Nina Roth
10. (Japan) Satsuki Fujisawa
11. (United States) Jamie Sinclair
12. (Alberta) Kelsey Rocque (Laura Crocker)

== Men ==
=== Teams ===
The teams are listed as follows:

Skip	Third	Second	Lead	Locale
Brendan Bottcher	Darren Moulding	Brad Thiessen	Karrick Martin	Edmonton, Alberta
Reid Carruthers	Jeff Stoughton	Derek Samagalski	Colin Hodgson	Winnipeg, Manitoba
Niklas Edin	Oskar Eriksson	Rasmus Wranå	Christoffer Sundgren	Karlstad, Sweden
John Epping	Mat Camm	Patrick Janssen	Tim March	Toronto, Ontario
Jason Gunnlaugson	Alex Forrest	Ian McMillan	Connor Njegovan	Winnipeg, Manitoba
Brad Gushue	Mark Nichols	Brett Gallant	Geoff Walker	St. John's, Newfoundland and Labrador
Brad Jacobs	Ryan Fry	E. J. Harnden	Ryan Harnden	Sault Ste. Marie, Ontario
Kevin Koe	Marc Kennedy	Brent Laing	Ben Hebert	Calgary, Alberta
Mike McEwen	B. J. Neufeld	Matt Wozniak	Denni Neufeld	Winnipeg, Manitoba
Bruce Mouat	Grant Hardie	Bobby Lammie	Hammy McMillan Jr.	Edinburgh, Scotland
John Shuster	Tyler George	Matt Hamilton	John Landsteiner	(United States) Duluth, Minnesota
Kyle Smith	Thomas Muirhead	Kyle Waddell	Cammy Smith	Stirling, Scotland

=== Round-robin standings ===
Key
Teams to Playoffs
Teams to Tiebreaker

Pool A	W	L	PF	PA	SO
(Sweden) Niklas Edin	4	1	31	24	10
(Manitoba) Jason Gunnlaugson	3	2	27	26	3
(Manitoba) Mike McEwen	3	2	23	21	9
(Scotland) Bruce Mouat	2	3	22	26	5
(Scotland) Kyle Smith	2	3	26	27	8
(Ontario) Brad Jacobs	1	4	19	27	7

Pool B	W	L	PF	PA	SO
(Alberta) Kevin Koe	5	0	37	25	1
(Newfoundland and Labrador) Brad Gushue	4	1	35	26	10
(Ontario) John Epping	2	3	22	26	11
(United States) John Shuster	2	3	25	33	12
(Manitoba) Reid Carruthers	1	4	30	31	2
(Alberta) Brendan Bottcher	1	4	23	33	4

=== Round-robin results ===
All draw times are listed in Eastern Daylight Time (UTC-04:00).

==== Draw 1 ====
Tuesday, April 10, 7:00 pm

Sheet B	1	2	3	4	5	6	7	8	Final
(Manitoba) Reid Carruthers 🔨	2	0	0	0	1	0	2	0	5
(Ontario) John Epping	0	2	0	0	0	2	0	2	6

Sheet D	1	2	3	4	5	6	7	8	9	Final
(Ontario) Brad Jacobs	0	0	2	0	2	0	0	1	0	5
(Manitoba) Jason Gunnlaugson 🔨	0	2	0	1	0	2	0	0	2	7

==== Draw 2 ====
Wednesday, April 11, 8:30 am

Sheet C	1	2	3	4	5	6	7	8	Final
(Manitoba) Mike McEwen 🔨	0	0	2	0	0	1	0	0	3
(Scotland) Bruce Mouat	0	1	0	2	0	0	3	0	6

==== Draw 3 ====
Wednesday, April 11, 12:00 pm

Sheet B	1	2	3	4	5	6	7	8	Final
(Newfoundland and Labrador) Brad Gushue	0	3	0	2	1	0	2	X	8
(Alberta) Brendan Bottcher 🔨	1	0	1	0	0	2	0	X	4

Sheet C	1	2	3	4	5	6	7	8	Final
(Ontario) Brad Jacobs 🔨	0	4	0	1	0	0	1	1	7
(Scotland) Kyle Smith	1	0	1	0	1	1	0	0	4

Sheet D	1	2	3	4	5	6	7	8	Final
(Alberta) Kevin Koe 🔨	2	1	0	2	0	1	1	X	7
(Ontario) John Epping	0	0	1	0	2	0	0	X	3

Sheet E	1	2	3	4	5	6	7	8	Final
(Sweden) Niklas Edin 🔨	1	0	1	2	0	0	2	X	6
(Manitoba) Jason Gunnlaugson	0	2	0	0	0	2	0	X	4

==== Draw 5 ====
Wednesday, April 11, 8:00 pm

Sheet A	1	2	3	4	5	6	7	8	Final
(Ontario) John Epping	0	0	0	1	0	0	X	X	1
(Alberta) Brendan Bottcher 🔨	2	1	1	0	1	2	X	X	7

Sheet B	1	2	3	4	5	6	7	8	9	Final
(Manitoba) Mike McEwen 🔨	0	2	0	2	1	0	0	1	0	6
(Sweden) Niklas Edin	2	0	2	0	0	2	0	0	3	9

Sheet C	1	2	3	4	5	6	7	8	Final
(Manitoba) Reid Carruthers 🔨	2	0	0	2	0	1	0	0	5
(United States) John Shuster	0	2	1	0	2	0	2	1	8

Sheet D	1	2	3	4	5	6	7	8	Final
(Scotland) Kyle Smith	0	2	0	3	2	1	X	X	8
(Scotland) Bruce Mouat 🔨	1	0	2	0	0	0	X	X	3

Sheet E	1	2	3	4	5	6	7	8	Final
(Newfoundland and Labrador) Brad Gushue	0	2	0	2	2	0	2	0	8
(Alberta) Kevin Koe 🔨	2	0	1	0	0	6	0	1	10

==== Draw 7 ====
Thursday, April 12, 12:00 pm

Sheet A	1	2	3	4	5	6	7	8	9	Final
(Sweden) Niklas Edin 🔨	2	0	0	2	0	0	1	0	0	5
(Scotland) Kyle Smith	0	3	0	0	0	1	0	1	2	7

Sheet B	1	2	3	4	5	6	7	8	Final
(Ontario) Brad Jacobs 🔨	1	0	0	0	0	X	X	X	1
(Scotland) Bruce Mouat	0	3	1	1	1	X	X	X	6

Sheet C	1	2	3	4	5	6	7	8	Final
(Manitoba) Mike McEwen	3	2	0	0	0	3	X	X	8
(Manitoba) Jason Gunnlaugson 🔨	0	0	1	1	1	0	X	X	3

Sheet D	1	2	3	4	5	6	7	8	Final
(Newfoundland and Labrador) Brad Gushue 🔨	1	0	2	0	1	2	1	X	7
(United States) John Shuster	0	1	0	1	0	0	0	X	2

==== Draw 9 ====
Thursday, April 12, 8:00 pm

Sheet A	1	2	3	4	5	6	7	8	Final
(Manitoba) Jason Gunnlaugson 🔨	2	3	0	1	0	0	2	X	8
(Scotland) Bruce Mouat	0	0	2	0	2	0	0	X	4

Sheet B	1	2	3	4	5	6	7	8	Final
(United States) John Shuster	0	1	0	0	2	2	0	0	5
(Alberta) Kevin Koe 🔨	0	0	3	1	0	0	0	4	8

Sheet C	1	2	3	4	5	6	7	8	Final
(Newfoundland and Labrador) Brad Gushue	0	1	0	1	0	2	0	1	5
(Ontario) John Epping 🔨	1	0	1	0	2	0	0	0	4

Sheet D	1	2	3	4	5	6	7	8	Final
(Manitoba) Reid Carruthers	0	3	0	0	2	4	X	X	9
(Alberta) Brendan Bottcher 🔨	2	0	1	1	0	0	X	X	4

Sheet E	1	2	3	4	5	6	7	8	Final
(Ontario) Brad Jacobs	0	0	0	1	0	1	0	X	2
(Manitoba) Mike McEwen 🔨	1	0	0	0	2	0	2	X	5

==== Draw 10 ====
Friday, April 13, 8:00 am

Sheet A	1	2	3	4	5	6	7	8	Final
(United States) John Shuster 🔨	5	1	0	0	1	0	1	1	9
(Alberta) Brendan Bottcher	0	0	1	1	0	2	0	0	4

Sheet C	1	2	3	4	5	6	7	8	Final
(Sweden) Niklas Edin 🔨	3	0	2	0	1	0	X	X	6
(Scotland) Bruce Mouat	0	1	0	1	0	1	X	X	3

Sheet D	1	2	3	4	5	6	7	8	Final
(Scotland) Kyle Smith 🔨	0	1	0	0	0	2	0	0	3
(Manitoba) Jason Gunnlaugson	1	0	0	2	0	0	1	1	5

Sheet E	1	2	3	4	5	6	7	8	Final
(Manitoba) Reid Carruthers	0	2	0	0	1	0	2	0	5
(Alberta) Kevin Koe 🔨	1	0	0	2	0	2	0	1	6

==== Draw 12 ====
Friday, April 13, 4:00 pm

Sheet A	1	2	3	4	5	6	7	8	Final
(Newfoundland and Labrador) Brad Gushue 🔨	2	0	2	2	0	0	0	1	7
(Manitoba) Reid Carruthers	0	2	0	0	2	2	0	0	6

Sheet B	1	2	3	4	5	6	7	8	9	Final
(Ontario) Brad Jacobs 🔨	0	0	0	2	0	0	0	2	0	4
(Sweden) Niklas Edin	1	1	1	0	1	0	0	0	1	5

Sheet C	1	2	3	4	5	6	7	8	Final
(Alberta) Kevin Koe	0	0	3	2	0	1	0	X	6
(Alberta) Brendan Bottcher 🔨	1	1	0	0	1	0	1	X	4

Sheet D	1	2	3	4	5	6	7	8	Final
(Ontario) John Epping	3	0	2	1	0	2	X	X	8
(United States) John Shuster 🔨	0	1	0	0	1	0	X	X	2

Sheet E	1	2	3	4	5	6	7	8	Final
(Manitoba) Mike McEwen	0	2	0	1	2	0	1	1	7
(Scotland) Kyle Smith 🔨	2	0	1	0	0	1	0	0	4

==== Tiebreaker ====
Friday, April 13, 8:00 pm

Sheet E	1	2	3	4	5	6	7	8	Final
(Ontario) John Epping	1	2	0	1	0	2	0	X	6
(United States) John Shuster 🔨	0	0	1	0	1	0	1	X	3

=== Playoffs ===
Quarterfinals
1	(Alberta) Kevin Koe	5
8	(Ontario) John Epping	4
4	(Manitoba) Jason Gunnlaugson	3
5	(Manitoba) Mike McEwen	9
2	(Sweden) Niklas Edin	6
7	(Scotland) Kyle Smith	3
3	(Newfoundland and Labrador) Brad Gushue	6
6	(Scotland) Bruce Mouat	2

Semifinals
1	(Alberta) Kevin Koe	5
5	(Manitoba) Mike McEwen	4
2	(Sweden) Niklas Edin	6
3	(Newfoundland and Labrador) Brad Gushue	5

Final
1	(Alberta) Kevin Koe	6
2	(Sweden) Niklas Edin	2

==== Quarterfinals ====
Saturday, April 14, 11:30 am

Sheet B	1	2	3	4	5	6	7	8	Final
(Newfoundland and Labrador) Brad Gushue 🔨	0	2	0	1	0	0	3	X	6
(Scotland) Bruce Mouat	0	0	1	0	1	0	0	X	2

Sheet C	1	2	3	4	5	6	7	8	Final
(Manitoba) Jason Gunnlaugson 🔨	0	1	0	0	2	0	X	X	3
(Manitoba) Mike McEwen	2	0	0	5	0	2	X	X	9

Sheet D	1	2	3	4	5	6	7	8	Final
(Sweden) Niklas Edin	2	0	0	2	1	1	0	X	6
(Scotland) Kyle Smith	0	1	1	0	0	0	1	X	3

Sheet E	1	2	3	4	5	6	7	8	Final
(Alberta) Kevin Koe 🔨	2	0	0	1	1	0	1	0	5
(Ontario) John Epping	0	1	0	0	0	2	0	1	4

==== Semifinals ====
Saturday, April 14, 7:30 pm

Sheet B	1	2	3	4	5	6	7	8	9	Final
(Alberta) Kevin Koe 🔨	0	1	0	1	0	2	0	0	1	5
(Manitoba) Mike McEwen	0	0	1	0	1	0	0	2	0	4

Sheet C	1	2	3	4	5	6	7	8	Final
(Sweden) Niklas Edin	0	0	0	2	0	2	1	1	6
(Newfoundland and Labrador) Brad Gushue 🔨	0	2	1	0	2	0	0	0	5

==== Final ====
Sunday, April 15, 12:30 pm

Sheet C	1	2	3	4	5	6	7	8	Final
(Alberta) Kevin Koe 🔨	0	2	0	1	0	2	1	X	6
(Sweden) Niklas Edin	0	0	1	0	1	0	0	X	2

== Women ==
=== Teams ===
The teams are listed as follows:

Skip	Third	Second	Lead	Locale
Chelsea Carey	Cathy Overton-Clapham	Jocelyn Peterman	Laine Peters	Calgary, Alberta
Laura Crocker (Note: Kelsey Rocque, who normally skips the team was unable to make it to the grand slam. Third Laura Crocker moved up to skip and Kendra Lilly spared at third.)	Kendra Lilly	Taylor McDonald	Jen Gates	Edmonton, Alberta
Kerri Einarson	Selena Kaatz	Liz Fyfe	Kristin MacCuish	Winnipeg, Manitoba
Satsuki Fujisawa	Chinami Yoshida	Yumi Suzuki	Yurika Yoshida	Kitami, Japan
Anna Hasselborg	Sara McManus	Agnes Knochenhauer	Sofia Mabergs	Sundbyberg, Sweden
Rachel Homan	Emma Miskew	Lisa Weagle (Note: Weagle normally throws lead stones and Courtney normally throws second stones, but they entered the Players' Championship switching positions. They switched back to their regular positions after their second game.)	Joanne Courtney	Ottawa, Ontario
Jennifer Jones	Kaitlyn Lawes	Jill Officer	Dawn McEwen	Winnipeg, Manitoba
Kim Eun-jung	Kim Kyeong-ae	Kim Seon-yeong	Kim Yeong-mi	Uiseong, South Korea
Eve Muirhead	Anna Sloan	Vicki Adams	Lauren Gray	Stirling, Scotland
Nina Roth	Tabitha Peterson	Aileen Geving	Becca Hamilton	Blaine, United States
Jamie Sinclair	Alex Carlson	Vicky Persinger	Monica Walker	Blaine, United States
Silvana Tirinzoni	Esther Neuenschwander	Manuela Siegrist	Marlene Albrecht	Aarau, Switzerland

=== Round-robin standings ===
Key
Teams to Playoffs
Teams to Tiebreaker

Pool A	W	L	PF	PA	SO
(Manitoba) Jennifer Jones	5	0	38	19	127.95
(Scotland) Eve Muirhead	4	1	33	20	62.55
(United States) Nina Roth	3	2	25	27	206.00
(Alberta) Laura Crocker	2	3	35	34	116.85
(South Korea) Kim Eun-jung	1	4	23	36	87.85
(Ontario) Rachel Homan	0	5	19	37	106.05

Pool B	W	L	PF	PA	SO
(Sweden) Anna Hasselborg	4	1	30	17	105.65
(Manitoba) Kerri Einarson	3	2	25	24	167.90
(United States) Jamie Sinclair	3	2	30	23	429.30
(Switzerland) Silvana Tirinzoni	2	3	26	28	25.60
(Japan) Satsuki Fujisawa	2	3	17	32	288.20
(Alberta) Chelsea Carey	1	4	27	31	212.60

=== Round-robin results ===
All draw times are listed in Eastern Daylight Time (UTC-04:00).

==== Draw 1 ====
Tuesday, April 10, 7:00 pm

Sheet C	1	2	3	4	5	6	7	8	Final
(Ontario) Rachel Homan 🔨	0	0	2	1	0	1	0	0	4
(United States) Nina Roth	0	1	0	0	1	0	1	3	6

Sheet E	1	2	3	4	5	6	7	8	Final
(Manitoba) Jennifer Jones	1	0	1	0	0	1	0	2	5
(Scotland) Eve Muirhead 🔨	0	2	0	1	0	0	1	0	4

==== Draw 2 ====
Wednesday, April 11, 8:30 am

Sheet A	1	2	3	4	5	6	7	8	Final
(Japan) Satsuki Fujisawa	0	0	0	0	1	0	X	X	1
(United States) Jamie Sinclair 🔨	0	0	3	3	0	1	X	X	7

Sheet B	1	2	3	4	5	6	7	8	Final
(South Korea) Kim Eun-jung	0	0	2	1	0	5	0	0	8
(Alberta) Laura Crocker 🔨	0	2	0	0	2	0	3	3	10

Sheet D	1	2	3	4	5	6	7	8	Final
(Alberta) Chelsea Carey	0	2	1	0	3	0	1	0	7
(Switzerland) Silvana Tirinzoni 🔨	2	0	0	3	0	1	0	2	8

==== Draw 3 ====
Wednesday, April 11, 12:00 pm

Sheet A	1	2	3	4	5	6	7	8	Final
(Sweden) Anna Hasselborg 🔨	1	1	0	0	2	1	1	X	6
(Manitoba) Kerri Einarson	0	0	1	0	0	0	0	X	1

==== Draw 4 ====
Wednesday, April 11, 4:00 pm

Sheet A	1	2	3	4	5	6	7	8	Final
(Manitoba) Jennifer Jones	4	0	3	0	2	X	X	X	9
(United States) Nina Roth 🔨	0	1	0	1	0	X	X	X	2

Sheet B	1	2	3	4	5	6	7	8	Final
(Alberta) Chelsea Carey 🔨	0	2	2	2	0	4	X	X	10
(Japan) Satsuki Fujisawa	0	0	0	0	2	0	X	X	2

Sheet C	1	2	3	4	5	6	7	8	Final
(Switzerland) Silvana Tirinzoni 🔨	0	1	0	0	1	0	3	0	5
(United States) Jamie Sinclair	0	0	2	1	0	2	0	1	6

Sheet D	1	2	3	4	5	6	7	8	Final
(Scotland) Eve Muirhead 🔨	2	0	0	2	0	1	0	2	7
(South Korea) Kim Eun-jung	0	0	1	0	2	0	1	0	4

Sheet E	1	2	3	4	5	6	7	8	Final
(Ontario) Rachel Homan	0	1	0	1	1	0	X	X	3
(Alberta) Laura Crocker 🔨	1	0	5	0	0	3	X	X	9

==== Draw 6 ====
Thursday, April 12, 8:30 am

Sheet A	1	2	3	4	5	6	7	8	Final
(Ontario) Rachel Homan	0	0	0	2	0	2	1	0	5
(South Korea) Kim Eun-jung 🔨	1	1	1	0	2	0	0	1	6

Sheet B	1	2	3	4	5	6	7	8	Final
(Manitoba) Jennifer Jones	1	0	2	0	1	2	0	2	8
(Alberta) Laura Crocker 🔨	0	2	0	4	0	0	1	0	7

Sheet C	1	2	3	4	5	6	7	8	Final
(Scotland) Eve Muirhead 🔨	1	0	0	3	0	1	0	1	6
(United States) Nina Roth	0	0	1	0	1	0	2	0	4

Sheet D	1	2	3	4	5	6	7	8	Final
(Manitoba) Kerri Einarson 🔨	0	0	2	0	0	0	1	X	3
(Japan) Satsuki Fujisawa	2	1	0	0	1	1	0	X	5

Sheet E	1	2	3	4	5	6	7	8	Final
(Sweden) Anna Hasselborg	1	0	2	0	0	0	2	2	7
(United States) Jamie Sinclair 🔨	0	2	0	0	1	1	0	0	4

==== Draw 8 ====
Thursday, April 12, 4:00 pm

Sheet A	1	2	3	4	5	6	7	8	Final
(Scotland) Eve Muirhead	0	1	1	0	3	0	3	X	8
(Alberta) Laura Crocker 🔨	1	0	0	2	0	1	0	X	4

Sheet B	1	2	3	4	5	6	7	8	Final
(Sweden) Anna Hasselborg 🔨	0	2	2	1	0	0	1	X	6
(Switzerland) Silvana Tirinzoni	0	0	0	0	1	1	0	X	2

Sheet C	1	2	3	4	5	6	7	8	Final
(Manitoba) Jennifer Jones 🔨	3	0	1	1	1	0	2	X	8
(Ontario) Rachel Homan	0	2	0	0	0	2	0	X	4

Sheet D	1	2	3	4	5	6	7	8	Final
(United States) Nina Roth	0	2	0	3	0	0	1	X	6
(South Korea) Kim Eun-jung 🔨	0	0	2	0	1	0	0	X	3

Sheet E	1	2	3	4	5	6	7	8	Final
(Alberta) Chelsea Carey	1	0	1	0	0	0	2	0	4
(Manitoba) Kerri Einarson 🔨	0	2	0	2	1	1	0	1	7

==== Draw 11 ====
Friday, April 13, 12:00 pm

Sheet A	1	2	3	4	5	6	7	8	Final
(Alberta) Chelsea Carey	0	0	1	0	2	0	0	0	3
(United States) Jamie Sinclair 🔨	2	1	0	1	0	1	1	1	7

Sheet B	1	2	3	4	5	6	7	8	Final
(Manitoba) Jennifer Jones 🔨	1	0	2	3	0	2	X	X	8
(South Korea) Kim Eun-jung	0	1	0	0	1	0	X	X	2

Sheet C	1	2	3	4	5	6	7	8	Final
(Manitoba) Kerri Einarson	0	2	0	1	1	2	1	X	7
(Switzerland) Silvana Tirinzoni 🔨	1	0	2	0	0	0	0	X	3

Sheet D	1	2	3	4	5	6	7	8	Final
(Alberta) Laura Crocker	0	2	0	1	0	2	0	0	5
(United States) Nina Roth 🔨	1	0	2	0	1	0	1	2	7

Sheet E	1	2	3	4	5	6	7	8	Final
(Sweden) Anna Hasselborg	0	1	0	2	1	0	0	0	4
(Japan) Satsuki Fujisawa 🔨	1	0	2	0	0	3	0	1	7

==== Draw 13 ====
Friday, April 13, 8:00 pm

Sheet A	1	2	3	4	5	6	7	8	Final
(Switzerland) Silvana Tirinzoni 🔨	0	3	3	0	0	1	1	X	8
(Japan) Satsuki Fujisawa	1	0	0	1	0	0	0	X	2

Sheet B	1	2	3	4	5	6	7	8	Final
(United States) Jamie Sinclair	0	2	0	2	0	2	0	0	6
(Manitoba) Kerri Einarson 🔨	2	0	1	0	3	0	0	1	7

Sheet C	1	2	3	4	5	6	7	8	Final
(Sweden) Team Hasselborg* 🔨	1	1	0	4	1	0	X	X	7
(Alberta) Chelsea Carey	0	0	2	0	0	1	X	X	3

Sheet D	1	2	3	4	5	6	7	8	Final
(Ontario) Rachel Homan	0	1	0	2	0	0	0	X	3
(Scotland) Eve Muirhead 🔨	3	0	1	0	2	1	1	X	8

*Hasselborg missed the game due to illness. The team was skipped by Sara McManus for this game.

==== Tiebreaker ====
Saturday, April 14, 8:00 am

Sheet B	1	2	3	4	5	6	7	8	Final
(Alberta) Laura Crocker	0	1	0	2	0	0	0	X	3
(Japan) Satsuki Fujisawa 🔨	2	0	2	0	2	1	1	X	8

=== Playoffs ===
Quarterfinals
1	(Manitoba) Jennifer Jones	4
8	(Japan) Satsuki Fujisawa	2
4	(Manitoba) Kerri Einarson	9
5	(United States) Nina Roth	8
2	(Scotland) Eve Muirhead	5
7	(Switzerland) Silvana Tirinzoni	8
3	(Sweden) Anna Hasselborg	3
6	(United States) Jamie Sinclair	5

Semifinals
1	(Manitoba) Jennifer Jones	7
4	(Manitoba) Kerri Einarson	5
7	(Switzerland) Silvana Tirinzoni	3
6	(United States) Jamie Sinclair	4

Final
1	(Manitoba) Jennifer Jones	2
6	(United States) Jamie Sinclair	7

==== Quarterfinals ====
Saturday, April 14, 3:30 pm

Sheet B	1	2	3	4	5	6	7	8	9	Final
(Scotland) Eve Muirhead 🔨	0	1	2	0	1	0	1	0	0	5
(Switzerland) Silvana Tirinzoni	0	0	0	2	0	2	0	1	3	8

Sheet C	1	2	3	4	5	6	7	8	Final
(Manitoba) Jennifer Jones 🔨	1	1	0	1	1	0	0	X	4
(Japan) Satsuki Fujisawa	0	0	1	0	0	0	1	X	2

Sheet D	1	2	3	4	5	6	7	8	9	Final
(Manitoba) Kerri Einarson	0	2	0	2	0	2	2	0	1	9
(United States) Nina Roth 🔨	1	0	2	0	2	0	0	3	0	8

Sheet E	1	2	3	4	5	6	7	8	Final
(Sweden) Anna Hasselborg 🔨	0	1	0	1	0	0	1	0	3
(United States) Jamie Sinclair	0	0	2	0	0	2	0	1	5

==== Semifinals ====
Saturday, April 14, 7:30 pm

Sheet D	1	2	3	4	5	6	7	8	Final
(Switzerland) Silvana Tirinzoni	0	0	0	1	0	0	2	0	3
(United States) Jamie Sinclair 🔨	0	2	0	0	0	1	0	1	4

Sheet E	1	2	3	4	5	6	7	8	Final
(Manitoba) Jennifer Jones 🔨	1	0	1	0	1	0	2	2	7
(Manitoba) Kerri Einarson	0	2	0	1	0	2	0	0	5

==== Final ====
Sunday, April 15, 5:00 pm

Sheet C	1	2	3	4	5	6	7	8	Final
(Manitoba) Jennifer Jones 🔨	0	0	0	0	1	1	0	X	2
(United States) Jamie Sinclair	0	1	2	1	0	0	3	X	7
