= 2017 Meridian Canadian Open =

Grand Slam of Curling event

- Host city: North Battleford, Saskatchewan
- Arena: North Battleford Civic Centre
- Dates: January 3–8
- Men's winner: (Newfoundland and Labrador) Team Gushue
- Curling club: Bally Haly G&CC, St. John's, Newfoundland and Labrador
- Skip: Brad Gushue
- Third: Mark Nichols
- Second: Brett Gallant
- Lead: Geoff Walker
- Finalist: (Sweden) Niklas Edin
- Women's winner: (Alberta) Team Scheidegger
- Curling club: Lethbridge CC, Lethbridge, Alberta
- Skip: Casey Scheidegger
- Third: Cary-Anne McTaggart
- Second: Jessie Scheidegger
- Lead: Stephanie Enright
- Finalist: (Switzerland) Silvana Tirinzoni

The 2017 Meridian Canadian Open was held from January 3 to 8 at the North Battleford Civic Centre in North Battleford, Saskatchewan. This was the fourth Grand Slam of Curling event and third "major" of the 2016–17 curling season.

On the men's side, Newfoundland's Brad Gushue rink played in their fourth straight Canadian Open final, defeating the Niklas Edin team from Sweden, who were hoping to win their third Slam of the season. It was Gushue's seventh career Grand Slam. Gushue played a perfect game, curling 100% en route to defeating Edin 8-3.

On the women's side, the little-known Casey Scheidegger rink from Lethbridge, Alberta won their first Grand Slam title in their first ever Grand Slam event (excluding defunct events, which are not counted in media reports). They defeated the Silvana Tirinzoni rink from Switzerland who lost their second straight Slam final.

== Men ==
=== Teams ===
Skip	Third	Second	Lead	Locale	OOM rank
Greg Balsdon	Jonathan Beuk	David Staples	Scott Chadwick	Kingston, Ontario	21
Brendan Bottcher	Darren Moulding	Brad Thiessen	Karrick Martin	Edmonton, Alberta	14
Reid Carruthers	Braeden Moskowy	Derek Samagalski	Colin Hodgson	Winnipeg, Manitoba	2
Niklas Edin	Oskar Eriksson	Rasmus Wranå	Christoffer Sundgren	Karlstad, Sweden	4
John Epping	Mat Camm	Patrick Janssen	Tim March	Toronto, Ontario	5
Brad Gushue	Mark Nichols	Brett Gallant	Geoff Walker	St. John's, Newfoundland and Labrador	1
Brad Jacobs	Ryan Fry	E. J. Harnden	Ryan Harnden	Sault Ste. Marie, Ontario	6
Kevin Koe	Marc Kennedy	Brent Laing	Ben Hebert	Calgary, Alberta	3
Bruce Korte	Kevin Marsh	Dan Marsh	Matt Lang	Saskatoon, Saskatchewan	28
Steve Laycock	Kirk Muyres	Colton Flasch	Dallan Muyres	Saskatoon, Saskatchewan	8
Heath McCormick	Christopher Plys	Korey Dropkin	Thomas Howell	(United States) Blaine, Minnesota	31
Mike McEwen	B. J. Neufeld	Matt Wozniak	Denni Neufeld	Winnipeg, Manitoba	7
Jim Cotter (Fourth)	John Morris (Skip)	Tyrel Griffith	Rick Sawatsky	Vernon, British Columbia	11
John Shuster	Tyler George	Matt Hamilton	John Landsteiner	(United States) Duluth, Minnesota	17
Kyle Smith	Thomas Muirhead	Kyle Waddell	Cammy Smith	Stirling, Scotland	13
Charley Thomas	Nathan Connolly	Brandon Klassen	Craig Savill	Edmonton, Alberta	12

=== Knockout Draw Brackets ===
==== A Event ====
First Knockout		Semifinals		Qualifier 1
(Newfoundland and Labrador) Brad Gushue	8
(Saskatchewan) Bruce Korte	7	(Newfoundland and Labrador) Brad Gushue	4
(Ontario) Brad Jacobs	5	(Ontario) Brad Jacobs	5
(Scotland) Kyle Smith	4			(Ontario) Brad Jacobs	8
(Alberta) Kevin Koe	7			(Alberta) Kevin Koe	4
(Alberta) Charley Thomas	6	(Alberta) Kevin Koe	8
(Ontario) John Epping	4	(Ontario) Greg Balsdon	2
(Ontario) Greg Balsdon	7

First Knockout		Semifinals		Qualifier 2
(Sweden) Niklas Edin	4
(United States) Heath McCormick	3	(Sweden) Niklas Edin	7
(Manitoba) Mike McEwen	5	(Manitoba) Mike McEwen	5
(British Columbia) John Morris	3			(Sweden) Niklas Edin	7
(Manitoba) Reid Carruthers	7			(United States) John Shuster	6
(United States) John Shuster	8	(United States) John Shuster	5
(Saskatchewan) Steve Laycock	4	(Alberta) Brendan Bottcher	3
(Alberta) Brendan Bottcher	7

==== B Event ====
Second Knockout		Semifinals		Qualifier 3
(Saskatchewan) Bruce Korte	9
(Scotland) Kyle Smith	5	(Saskatchewan) Bruce Korte	4
(Ontario) John Epping	5	(Alberta) Charley Thomas	5
(Alberta) Charley Thomas	6			(Alberta) Charley Thomas	4
				(United States) John Shuster	7

Second Knockout		Semifinals		Qualifier 4
(United States) Heath McCormick	3
(British Columbia) John Morris	9	(British Columbia) John Morris	6
(Manitoba) Reid Carruthers	8	(Manitoba) Reid Carruthers	3
(Saskatchewan) Steve Laycock	3			(British Columbia) John Morris	6
				(Alberta) Kevin Koe	2

Second Knockout		Qualifier 5
(Newfoundland and Labrador) Brad Gushue	5
(Ontario) Greg Balsdon	4	(Newfoundland and Labrador) Brad Gushue	6
(Manitoba) Mike McEwen	8	(Manitoba) Mike McEwen	4
(Alberta) Brendan Bottcher	7

==== C Event ====
Third Knockout		Semifinals		Qualifier 6
(Scotland) Kyle Smith	3
(Ontario) John Epping	6	(Ontario) John Epping	3
		(Alberta) Brendan Bottcher	8
				(Alberta) Brendan Bottcher	6
				(Alberta) Kevin Koe	4

Third Knockout		Semifinals		Qualifier 7
(United States) Heath McCormick	1
(Saskatchewan) Steve Laycock	9	(Saskatchewan) Steve Laycock	8
		(Ontario) Greg Balsdon	4
				(Saskatchewan) Steve Laycock	7
				(Alberta) Charley Thomas	3

Third Knockout		Qualifier 8
(Manitoba) Reid Carruthers	4
(Saskatchewan) Bruce Korte	8	(Saskatchewan) Bruce Korte	1
		(Manitoba) Mike McEwen	7

=== Playoffs ===
Quarterfinals
A2	(Sweden) Niklas Edin	7
C1	(Alberta) Brendan Bottcher	1
B2	(British Columbia) John Morris	7
B1	(United States) John Shuster	1
A1	(Ontario) Brad Jacobs	7
C3	(Manitoba) Mike McEwen	3
B3	(Newfoundland and Labrador) Brad Gushue	5
C2	(Saskatchewan) Steve Laycock	2

Semifinals
A2	(Sweden) Niklas Edin	7
B2	(British Columbia) John Morris	4
A1	(Ontario) Brad Jacobs	0
B3	(Newfoundland and Labrador) Brad Gushue	4

Final
A2	(Sweden) Niklas Edin	4
B3	(Newfoundland and Labrador) Brad Gushue	8

==== Quarterfinals ====
Saturday, January 7, 12:00 pm

Sheet A	1	2	3	4	5	6	7	8	Final
(British Columbia) John Morris 🔨	0	2	0	0	1	4	X	X	7
(United States) John Shuster	0	0	0	1	0	0	X	X	1

Player percentages
(British Columbia) Team Morris		(United States) Team Shuster	
Rick Sawatsky	73%	John Landsteiner	94%
Tyrel Griffith	88%	Matt Hamilton	64%
John Morris	77%	Tyler George	74%
Jim Cotter	84%	John Shuster	78%
Total	81%	Total	77%

Sheet B	1	2	3	4	5	6	7	8	Final
(Ontario) Brad Jacobs 🔨	0	0	2	0	2	0	3	X	7
(Manitoba) Mike McEwen	0	0	0	2	0	1	0	X	3

Player percentages
(Ontario) Team Jacobs		(Manitoba) Team McEwen	
Ryan Harnden	82%	Denni Neufeld	95%
E.J. Harnden	82%	Matt Wozniak	84%
Ryan Fry	100%	B.J. Neufeld	87%
Brad Jacobs	99%	Mike McEwen	90%
Total	92%	Total	89%

Sheet C	1	2	3	4	5	6	7	8	Final
(Sweden) Niklas Edin 🔨	2	0	0	4	1	X	X	X	7
(Alberta) Brendan Bottcher	0	1	0	0	0	X	X	X	1

Player percentages
(Sweden) Team Edin		(Alberta) Team Bottcher	
Christoffer Sundgren	87%	Karrick Martin	86%
Rasmus Wranå	84%	Brad Thiessen	75%
Oskar Eriksson	91%	Darren Moulding	68%
Niklas Edin	97%	Brendan Bottcher	69%
Total	89%	Total	75%

Sheet D	1	2	3	4	5	6	7	8	Final
(Newfoundland and Labrador) Brad Gushue 🔨	0	1	0	0	2	0	2	X	5
(Saskatchewan) Steve Laycock	0	0	1	0	0	1	0	X	2

Player percentages
(Newfoundland and Labrador) Team Gushue		(Saskatchewan) Team Laycock	
Geoff Walker	87%	Dallan Muyres	85%
Brett Gallant	84%	Colton Flasch	85%
Mark Nichols	76%	Kirk Muyres	81%
Brad Gushue	100%	Steve Laycock	80%
Total	87%	Total	83%

==== Semifinals ====
Saturday, January 7, 8:00 pm

Team	1	2	3	4	5	6	7	8	Final
(Sweden) Niklas Edin 🔨	1	0	2	0	0	2	1	1	7
(British Columbia) John Morris	0	1	0	3	0	0	0	0	4

Player percentages
(Sweden) Team Edin		(British Columbia) Team Morris	
Christoffer Sundgren	91%	Rick Sawatsky	82%
Rasmus Wranå	67%	Tyrel Griffith	92%
Oskar Eriksson	83%	John Morris	86%
Niklas Edin	82%	Jim Cotter	84%
Total	81%	Total	86%

Team	1	2	3	4	5	6	7	8	Final
(Ontario) Brad Jacobs 🔨	0	0	0	0	0	0	0	X	0
(Newfoundland and Labrador) Brad Gushue	0	0	0	2	0	1	1	X	4

Player percentages
(Ontario) Team Jacobs		(Newfoundland and Labrador) Team Gushue	
Ryan Harnden	79%	Geoff Walker	93%
E.J. Harnden	86%	Brett Gallant	92%
Ryan Fry	71%	Mark Nichols	90%
Brad Jacobs	70%	Brad Gushue	92%
Total	77%	Total	92%

==== Final ====
Sunday, January 8, 11:00 am

Sheet C	1	2	3	4	5	6	7	8	Final
(Sweden) Niklas Edin 🔨	1	0	1	0	1	0	X	X	3
(Newfoundland and Labrador) Brad Gushue	0	4	0	1	0	3	X	X	8

Player percentages
(Sweden) Team Edin		(Newfoundland and Labrador) Team Gushue	
Christoffer Sundgren	93%	Geoff Walker	95%
Rasmus Wranå	91%	Brett Gallant	90%
Oskar Eriksson	70%	Mark Nichols	91%
Niklas Edin	77%	Brad Gushue	100%
Total	83%	Total	95%

== Women ==
=== Teams ===
Skip	Third	Second	Lead	Locale	OOM rank
Chelsea Carey	Amy Nixon	Jocelyn Peterman	Laine Peters	Calgary, Alberta	8
Kerri Einarson	Selena Kaatz	Liz Fyfe	Kristin MacCuish	Winnipeg, Manitoba	10
Michelle Englot	Kate Cameron	Leslie Wilson-Westcott	Raunora Westcott	Winnipeg, Manitoba	14
Allison Flaxey	Clancy Grandy	Lynn Kreviazuk	Morgan Court	Caledon, Ontario	6
Tracy Fleury	Crystal Webster	Jenna Walsh	Amanda Gates	Sudbury, Ontario	12
Jacqueline Harrison	Janet Murphy	Stephanie Matheson	Melissa Foster	Mississauga, Ontario	20
Anna Hasselborg	Sara McManus	Agnes Knochenhauer	Sofia Mabergs	Sundbyberg, Sweden	7
Rachel Homan	Emma Miskew	Joanne Courtney	Lisa Weagle	Ottawa, Ontario	1
Jennifer Jones	Kaitlyn Lawes	Jill Officer	Dawn McEwen	Winnipeg, Manitoba	2
Briane Meilleur	Rhonda Varnes	Janelle Vachon	Sarah Neufeld	Winnipeg, Manitoba	33
Kelsey Rocque	Laura Crocker	Taylor McDonald	Jen Gates	Edmonton, Alberta	9
Casey Scheidegger	Cary-Anne McTaggart	Jessie Scheidegger	Stephanie Enright	Lethbridge, Alberta	22
Anna Sidorova	Margarita Fomina	Alexandra Raeva	Nkeiruka Ezekh	Moscow, Russia	11
Val Sweeting	Lori Olson-Johns	Dana Ferguson	Rachelle Brown	Edmonton, Alberta	4
Silvana Tirinzoni	Cathy Overton-Clapham	Esther Neuenschwander	Marlene Albrecht	Zürich, Switzerland	3
Wang Bingyu	Zhou Yan	Liu Jinli	Yang Ying	Harbin, China	27

=== Knockout Draw Brackets ===
==== A Event ====
First Knockout		Semifinals		Qualifier 1
(Ontario) Rachel Homan	4
(Ontario) Jacqueline Harrison	5	(Ontario) Jacqueline Harrison	6
(Alberta) Kelsey Rocque	5	(Alberta) Kelsey Rocque	4
(Alberta) Casey Scheidegger	4			(Ontario) Jacqueline Harrison	3
(Sweden) Anna Hasselborg	3			(Alberta) Val Sweeting	6
(China) Wang Bingyu	5	(China) Wang Bingyu	5
(Alberta) Val Sweeting	10	(Alberta) Val Sweeting	6
(Russia) Anna Sidorova	2

First Knockout		Semifinals		Qualifier 2
(Manitoba) Jennifer Jones	4
(Manitoba) Briane Meilleur	5	(Manitoba) Briane Meilleur	5
(Manitoba) Michelle Englot	5	(Manitoba) Michelle Englot	6
(Alberta) Chelsea Carey	4			(Manitoba) Michelle Englot	3
(Ontario) Allison Flaxey	9			(Switzerland) Silvana Tirinzoni	8
(Ontario) Tracy Fleury	7	(Ontario) Allison Flaxey	5
(Switzerland) Silvana Tirinzoni	5	(Switzerland) Silvana Tirinzoni	7
(Manitoba) Kerri Einarson	4

==== B Event ====
Second Knockout		Semifinals		Qualifier 3
(Ontario) Rachel Homan	4
(Alberta) Casey Scheidegger	10	(Alberta) Casey Scheidegger	6
(Sweden) Anna Hasselborg	7	(Sweden) Anna Hasselborg	7
(Russia) Anna Sidorova	5			(Sweden) Anna Hasselborg	4
				(Manitoba) Michelle Englot	2

Second Knockout		Semifinals		Qualifier 4
(Manitoba) Jennifer Jones	8
(Alberta) Chelsea Carey	3	(Manitoba) Jennifer Jones	6
(Manitoba) Kerri Einarson	5	(Manitoba) Kerri Einarson	5
(Ontario) Tracy Fleury	2			(Manitoba) Jennifer Jones	8
				(Ontario) Jacqueline Harrison	4

Second Knockout		Qualifier 5
(Alberta) Kelsey Rocque	4
(China) Wang Bingyu	3	(Alberta) Kelsey Rocque	3
(Manitoba) Briane Meilleur	5	(Ontario) Allison Flaxey	7
(Ontario) Allison Flaxey	11

==== C Event ====
Third Knockout		Semifinals		Qualifier 6
(Ontario) Rachel Homan	8
(Russia) Anna Sidorova	3	(Ontario) Rachel Homan	6
		(Manitoba) Briane Meilleur	0
				(Ontario) Rachel Homan	3
				(Ontario) Jacqueline Harrison	7

Third Knockout		Semifinals		Qualifier 7
(Alberta) Chelsea Carey	2
(Ontario) Tracy Fleury	8	(Ontario) Tracy Fleury	5
		(China) Wang Bingyu	4
				(Ontario) Tracy Fleury	6
				(Manitoba) Michelle Englot	5

Third Knockout		Qualifier 8
(Alberta) Casey Scheidegger	7
(Manitoba) Kerri Einarson	4	(Alberta) Casey Scheidegger	9
		(Alberta) Kelsey Rocque	4

=== Playoffs ===
Quarterfinals
A2	(Switzerland) Silvana Tirinzoni	6
C1	(Ontario) Jacqueline Harrison	2
B1	(Sweden) Anna Hasselborg	7
B3	(Ontario) Allison Flaxey	5
A1	(Alberta) Val Sweeting	7
C2	(Ontario) Tracy Fleury	4
B2	(Manitoba) Jennifer Jones	5
C3	(Alberta) Casey Scheidegger	6

Semifinals
A2	(Switzerland) Silvana Tirinzoni	7
B1	(Sweden) Anna Hasselborg	4
A1	(Alberta) Val Sweeting	3
C3	(Alberta) Casey Scheidegger	7

Final
A2	(Switzerland) Silvana Tirinzoni	4
C3	(Alberta) Casey Scheidegger	5

==== Quarterfinals ====
Saturday, January 7, 4:00 pm

Team	1	2	3	4	5	6	7	8	Final
(Switzerland) Silvana Tirinzoni 🔨	0	3	0	1	0	0	2	X	6
(Ontario) Jacqueline Harrison	0	0	0	0	1	1	0	X	2

Player percentages
(Switzerland) Team Tirinzoni		(Ontario) Team Harrison	
Marlene Albrecht	79%	Melissa Foster	94%
Esther Neuenschwander	77%	Stephanie Matheson	84%
Cathy Overton-Clapham	88%	Janet Murphy	90%
Silvana Tirinzoni	78%	Jacqueline Harrison	77%
Total	81%	Total	86%

Team	1	2	3	4	5	6	7	8	Final
(Sweden) Anna Hasselborg 🔨	2	0	2	1	0	1	0	1	7
(Ontario) Allison Flaxey	0	4	0	0	0	0	1	0	5

Player percentages
(Sweden) Team Hasselborg		(Ontario) Team Flaxey	
Sofia Mabergs	89%	Morgan Court	94%
Agnes Knochenhauer	76%	Lynn Kreviazuk	73%
Sara McManus	84%	Clancy Grandy	82%
Anna Hasselborg	78%	Allison Flaxey	77%
Total	82%	Total	79%

Team	1	2	3	4	5	6	7	8	Final
(Alberta) Val Sweeting 🔨	2	0	1	3	0	1	0	X	7
(Ontario) Tracy Fleury	0	1	0	0	1	0	2	X	4

Player percentages
(Alberta) Team Sweeting		(Ontario) Team Fleury	
Rachelle Brown	76%	Amanda Gates	86%
Dana Ferguson	93%	Jenna Walsh	66%
Lori Olson-Johns	80%	Crystal Webster	52%
Val Sweeting	91%	Tracy Fleury	70%
Total	85%	Total	68%

Team	1	2	3	4	5	6	7	8	Final
(Manitoba) Jennifer Jones 🔨	0	2	0	0	2	0	1	0	5
(Alberta) Casey Scheidegger	0	0	0	1	0	3	0	2	6

Player percentages
(Manitoba) Team Jones		(Alberta) Team Scheidegger	
Dawn McEwen	92%	Stephanie Enright	79%
Jill Officer	80%	Jessie Scheidegger	77%
Kaitlyn Lawes	77%	Cary-Anne McTaggart	85%
Jennifer Jones	63%	Casey Scheidegger	80%
Total	78%	Total	80%

==== Semifinals ====
Saturday, January 7, 8:00 pm

Team	1	2	3	4	5	6	7	8	Final
(Switzerland) Silvana Tirinzoni 🔨	2	0	1	1	0	3	0	X	7
(Sweden) Anna Hasselborg	0	1	0	0	2	0	1	X	4

Player percentages
(Switzerland) Team Tirinzoni		(Sweden) Team Hasselborg	
Marlene Albrecht	72%	Sofia Mabergs	97%
Esther Neuenschwander	77%	Agnes Knochenhauer	81%
Cathy Overton-Clapham	87%	Sara McManus	69%
Silvana Tirinzoni	87%	Anna Hasselborg	64%
Total	81%	Total	78%

Team	1	2	3	4	5	6	7	8	Final
(Alberta) Val Sweeting 🔨	0	0	0	0	2	0	1	X	3
(Alberta) Casey Scheidegger	0	3	2	1	0	1	0	X	7

Player percentages
(Alberta) Team Sweeting		(Alberta) Team Scheidegger	
Rachelle Brown	89%	Stephanie Enright	95%
Dana Ferguson	93%	Jessie Scheidegger	98%
Lori Olson-Johns	61%	Cary-Anne McTaggart	98%
Val Sweeting	45%	Casey Scheidegger	89%
Total	72%	Total	95%

==== Final ====
Sunday, January 8, 3:00 pm

Sheet C	1	2	3	4	5	6	7	8	Final
(Switzerland) Silvana Tirinzoni 🔨	1	1	0	0	0	2	0	0	4
(Alberta) Casey Scheidegger	0	0	1	1	1	0	1	1	5

Player percentages
(Switzerland) Team Tirinzoni		(Alberta) Team Scheidegger	
Marlene Albrecht	77%	Stephanie Enright	87%
Esther Neuenschwander	98%	Jessie Scheidegger	80%
Cathy Overton-Clapham	87%	Cary-Anne McTaggart	79%
Silvana Tirinzoni	58%	Casey Scheidegger	86%
Total	80%	Total	83%
