= Cary-Anne McTaggart =

Canadian curler

- Curler
- Born: Cary-Anne Sallows; June 4, 1986 (age 40); Grande Prairie, Alberta

Team
- Curling club: Grande Prairie CC, Grande Prairie, AB
- Skip: Ashley Howard
- Third: Cary-Anne McTaggart
- Second: Shelby Lamontagne
- Lead: Jill Springer

Curling career
- Member Association: Alberta (2002—2022); Saskatchewan (2022—present)
- Hearts: 2 (2018, 2019)
- Top CTRS ranking: 5th (2016-17, 2018-19)
- Grand Slam victories: 1 (2017 Canadian Open)

Cary-Anne McTaggart (born June 4, 1986 in Grande Prairie, Alberta as Cary-Anne Sallows) is a Canadian curler from Milk River, Alberta. She currently plays third for Team Ashley Howard.

== Career ==
=== Juniors ===
McTaggart won three provincial junior titles playing third for the Desirée Robertson rink in 2003 and 2005 and for Kalynn Park in 2007. Their provincial titles qualified the rink to represent Alberta in each of those years' Canadian Junior Curling Championships. At the 2003 Canadian Junior Curling Championships, the team finished the round robin with a 9-3 record and would lose in the semifinal, placing third overall. At the 2005 Canadian Junior Curling Championships, the team went undefeated in the round robin, but would end up losing in the final to New Brunswick's Andrea Kelly rink. On her new team at the 2007 Canadian Junior Curling Championships, the rink would finish with a 7-5 record, missing the playoffs.

=== Women's ===
After juniors, McTaggart played for Team Renée Sonnenberg until 2010, when she joined forced with Desirée Robertson (now Owen) again for two seasons. She returned to the Sonnenberg rink in 2012, playing second for the team. The team won the A qualifier at the 2013 Canadian Olympic Curling Pre-Trials, qualifying the rink for the 2013 Canadian Olympic Curling Trials. There, the team placed last with a 2-5 record. After the season, McTaggart left the team to join the Scheidegger rink at third. They won their first Grand Slam event at the 2017 Meridian Canadian Open.

== Personal life ==
Her brother is fellow curler Tom Sallows. She works as a registered nurse with Alberta Health Services. She is married and has one child.
