= Tom Brewster =

Scottish curler (born 1974)

- Curler
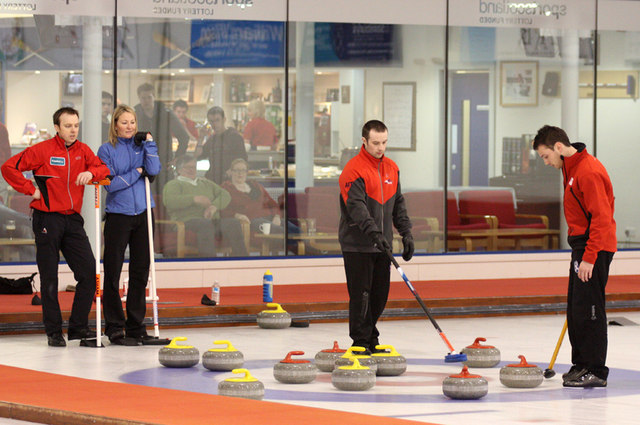
- Born: Thomas Brewster Jr. 10 April 1974 (age 52); St Andrews, Scotland

Team
- Curling club: Curl Aberdeen, Aberdeen, Scotland
- Skip: Tom Brewster
- Third: Frazer Hare
- Second: Robbie Stevenson
- Lead: Don Frame

Curling career
- World Championship: 5 (2002, 2011, 2012, 2013, 2016)
- European Championship: 4 (2012, 2013, 2014, 2016)
- Olympic: 1 (2014)
Medal record
Curling
Representing Great Britain
Olympic Games
Silver medal – second place	2014 Sochi
Representing Scotland
World Championships
Silver medal – second place	2011 Regina
Silver medal – second place	2012 Basel
Bronze medal – third place	2002 Bismarck
Bronze medal – third place	2013 Victoria
European Championships
Bronze medal – third place	2013 Stavanger
European Mixed Championships
Gold medal – first place	2006 Claut
Gold medal – first place	2009 Prague
World Junior Championships
Gold medal – first place	1995 Perth
World Senior Championships
Silver medal – second place	2025 Fredericton
Silver medal – second place	2026 Geneva

Thomas Brewster Jr. (born 10 April 1974) is a Scottish curler from Aberdeen, Scotland. He won a silver medal at 2014 Winter Olympics.

== Career ==
Brewster is a former World Junior champion, having won the title in 1995. The Scottish team which consisted of Paul Westwood, Ronald Brewster, Steve Still and David Murdoch finished 8–1 after the round robin, and defeated Sweden's Henrik Edlund and then Germany's Daniel Herberg to win the championship.

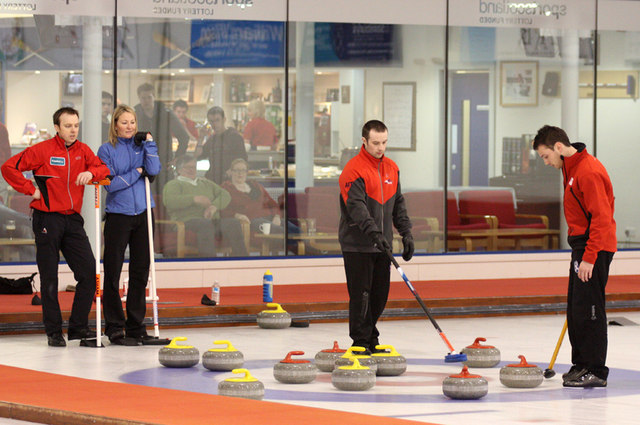
Brewster (far left) at the 2009 Scottish Mixed Curling Championship.

Brewster has skipped Scotland to two European Mixed titles, in 2006 and in 2009.

Brewster has been a frequent participant in World Curling Tour events, perhaps more so than the more successful Scottish teams. He has won a total of six WCT events, all European events. He has played in 12 Grand Slam events, advancing to the quarterfinals on five occasions (but never further).

In 2002, Brewster was invited to play in his first World championship. He was an alternate for the Warwick Smith team which won the bronze medal. Brewster won his first Scottish men's title in 2011, and represented Scotland at the 2011 Ford World Men's Curling Championship, finishing second in the round robin and winning the silver by losing the final against Canada's Jeff Stoughton. In 2012 he again won silver, this time losing in the final against Canadian skip Glenn Howard.

=== 2014 Olympic team ===
Former World Champion David Murdoch was added to the Brewster rink in 2012 to boost the team's chances at the 2014 Winter Olympics. The team did not find immediate success in their first major tournament, finishing 7th at the 2012 European Curling Championships. After then, Brewster was bumped to third on the team, with Murdoch skipping. This turned out to be a successful lineup change, as the team won a bronze medal at the 2013 Ford World Men's Curling Championship. The team then went on to take bronze at the 2013 European Championships.

Brewster made his Team GB Winter Olympic debut at the Sochi 2014 Winter Olympics. Brewster would not see any action at the games, as he would be the team's alternate for the event. However, he and teammates David Murdoch, Michael Goodfellow, Scott Andrews and Greg Drummond wound up winning the silver medal, after losing to Canada's Brad Jacobs rink in the gold medal game. The team disbanded in 2014.

Following the 2014 Olympics, Brewster focused on fitness training, in order to overcome limitations due to a broken leg he suffered when he was younger. In a 2016 interview with The Times he said that this training had allowed him to significantly improve his technique. Subsequently, he formed part of a new rink with Hammy McMillan Jr., Ross Paterson, and Glen Muirhead. In 2016 Brewster guided his rink to victories over Team Murdoch in both the Scottish championships in February and the European Playdowns in October. Team Brewster also competed for Scotland at the 2016 World Men's Curling Championship, although they missed out on a medal: subsequently the team were passed over for selection for the 2018 Winter Olympics in favour of Kyle Smith's rink.

== Personal life ==
Tom is now the Ice rink manager at Curl Aberdeen. He is married to Kim Brewster, and has one son and one daughter.
