= 2016 European Curling Championships – Men's tournament =

2016 European Curling Championships Men's tournament
- Host city: Renfrewshire, Scotland
- Arena: Braehead Arena
- Dates: November 18–26
- Winner: Sweden
- Curling club: Karlstads CK, Karlstad
- Skip: Niklas Edin
- Third: Oskar Eriksson
- Second: Rasmus Wranå
- Lead: Christoffer Sundgren
- Alternate: Henrik Leek
- Finalist: Norway

The men's tournament of the 2016 European Curling Championships was held from November 18 to 26 in Renfrewshire, Scotland. The winners of the Group C tournament in Ljubljana, Slovenia will move on to the Group B tournament. The top eight men's teams at the 2016 European Curling Championships will represent their respective nations at the 2017 Ford World Men's Curling Championship in Edmonton, Alberta, Canada.

== Group A ==
=== Teams ===
Austria	Denmark	Finland	Germany	Italy
Skip: Sebastian Wunderer; Third: Mathias Genner; Second: Martin Reichel; Lead: Philipp Nothegger; Alternate: Markus Forejtek	Skip: Rasmus Stjerne; Third: Johnny Frederiksen; Second: Mikkel Poulsen; Lead: Troels Harry; Alternate: Oliver Dupont	Skip: Aku Kauste; Third: Kasper Hakunti; Second: Pauli Jäämies; Lead: Janne Pitko; Alternate: Jere Sullanmaa	Fourth: Alexander Baumann; Third: Manuel Walter; Second: Daniel Herberg; Skip: Andy Kapp; Alternate: Ryan Sherrard	Skip: Joël Retornaz; Third: Amos Mosaner; Second: Andrea Pilzer; Lead: Daniele Ferrazza; Alternate: Fabio Ribotta
Norway	Russia	Scotland	Sweden	Switzerland
Skip: Thomas Ulsrud; Third: Torger Nergård; Second: Christoffer Svae; Lead: Håvard Vad Petersson; Alternate: Sander Rølvåg	Skip: Alexey Timofeev; Third: Alexey Stukalskiy; Second: Timur Gadzhikanov; Lead: Artur Razhabov; Alternate: Artur Ali	Skip: Tom Brewster; Third: Glen Muirhead; Second: Ross Paterson; Lead: Hammy McMillan Jr. Alternate: Duncan Menzies	Skip: Niklas Edin; Third: Oskar Eriksson; Second: Rasmus Wranå; Lead: Christoffer Sundgren; Alternate: Henrik Leek	Fourth: Benoît Schwarz; Third: Claudio Pätz; Skip: Peter de Cruz; Lead: Valentin Tanner; Alternate: Reto Gribi

=== Round-robin standings ===
Final round-robin standings

Key
Teams to Playoffs
Teams to Tiebreaker
Teams relegated to 2016 Group B

Country	Skip	W	L	PF	PA	Ends Won	Ends Lost	Blank Ends	Stolen Ends	Shot Pct.
Sweden	Niklas Edin	8	1	65	30	36	23	14	9	88%
Norway	Thomas Ulsrud	6	3	64	43	37	31	14	10	84%
Switzerland	Peter de Cruz	6	3	50	40	32	31	17	7	84%
Russia	Alexey Timofeev	6	3	59	49	40	33	10	13	81%
Germany	Andreas Kapp	4	5	53	49	33	31	18	7	81%
Scotland	Tom Brewster	4	5	50	53	34	36	20	8	84%
Italy	Joel Retornaz	3	6	51	58	35	37	13	6	78%
Austria	Sebastian Wunderer	3	6	46	72	31	37	10	4	74%
Finland	Aku Kauste	3	6	41	65	30	39	14	6	79%
Denmark	Rasmus Stjerne	2	7	38	58	26	36	16	5	79%

=== Round-robin results ===
==== Draw 1 ====
Saturday, November 19, 9:00

Sheet A	1	2	3	4	5	6	7	8	9	10	Final
Germany (Kapp)	0	0	0	1	0	2	0	1	X	X	4
Sweden (Edin) 🔨	2	3	0	0	2	0	2	0	X	X	9

Sheet B	1	2	3	4	5	6	7	8	9	10	Final
Finland (Kauste)	0	0	0	2	1	0	0	X	X	X	3
Norway (Ulsrud) 🔨	0	2	5	0	0	2	1	X	X	X	10

Sheet C	1	2	3	4	5	6	7	8	9	10	Final
Austria (Wunderer) 🔨	1	0	1	0	0	1	0	1	0	0	4
Switzerland (de Cruz)	0	1	0	1	1	0	2	0	0	1	6

Sheet D	1	2	3	4	5	6	7	8	9	10	Final
Scotland (Brewster)	0	0	0	0	1	0	0	2	0	X	3
Denmark (Stjerne) 🔨	0	0	0	2	0	3	2	0	1	X	8

Sheet E	1	2	3	4	5	6	7	8	9	10	Final
Italy (Retornaz)	0	0	0	1	0	1	1	0	0	X	3
Russia (Timofeev) 🔨	1	2	1	0	1	0	0	1	1	X	7

==== Draw 2 ====
Saturday, November 19, 19:00

Sheet A	1	2	3	4	5	6	7	8	9	10	11	Final
Norway (Ulsrud) 🔨	0	1	0	3	0	0	2	0	0	1	0	7
Scotland (Brewster)	1	0	3	0	0	2	0	0	1	0	1	8

Sheet B	1	2	3	4	5	6	7	8	9	10	Final
Sweden (Edin)	1	1	0	0	2	1	0	2	X	X	7
Denmark (Stjerne) 🔨	0	0	0	1	0	0	0	0	X	X	1

Sheet C	1	2	3	4	5	6	7	8	9	10	Final
Italy (Retornaz)	0	0	3	0	1	0	1	1	0	2	8
Germany (Kapp) 🔨	3	0	0	0	0	1	0	0	3	0	7

Sheet D	1	2	3	4	5	6	7	8	9	10	Final
Russia (Timofeev)	0	0	0	1	0	1	0	0	1	X	3
Switzerland (de Cruz) 🔨	0	1	1	0	2	0	1	1	0	X	6

Sheet E	1	2	3	4	5	6	7	8	9	10	Final
Finland (Kauste) 🔨	1	0	0	2	0	3	0	0	1	0	7
Austria (Wunderer)	0	1	1	0	1	0	0	3	0	2	8

==== Draw 3 ====
Sunday, November 20, 12:00

Sheet A	1	2	3	4	5	6	7	8	9	10	Final
Switzerland (de Cruz) 🔨	0	2	1	0	3	0	0	4	X	X	10
Finland (Kauste)	1	0	0	1	0	0	0	0	X	X	2

Sheet B	1	2	3	4	5	6	7	8	9	10	Final
Germany (Kapp) 🔨	1	0	0	2	0	0	1	0	1	0	5
Russia (Timofeev)	0	2	1	0	2	0	0	1	0	0	6

Sheet C	1	2	3	4	5	6	7	8	9	10	Final
Sweden (Edin) 🔨	1	0	0	1	1	0	1	0	0	X	4
Scotland (Brewster)	0	0	1	0	0	1	0	3	3	X	8

Sheet D	1	2	3	4	5	6	7	8	9	10	Final
Austria (Wunderer)	0	2	0	0	1	0	2	0	1	X	6
Italy (Retornaz) 🔨	2	0	1	3	0	1	0	2	0	X	9

Sheet E	1	2	3	4	5	6	7	8	9	10	Final
Norway (Ulsrud)	0	0	0	2	0	2	1	1	0	X	6
Denmark (Stjerne) 🔨	1	0	1	0	1	0	0	0	1	X	4

==== Draw 4 ====
Monday, November 21, 8:00

Sheet A	1	2	3	4	5	6	7	8	9	10	Final
Denmark (Stjerne)	0	0	2	0	1	0	1	0	0	X	4
Italy (Retornaz) 🔨	0	2	0	1	0	2	0	2	1	X	8

Sheet B	1	2	3	4	5	6	7	8	9	10	11	Final
Austria (Wunderer)	0	3	0	0	0	1	0	0	2	0	1	7
Scotland (Brewster) 🔨	1	0	0	3	0	0	0	1	0	1	0	6

Sheet C	1	2	3	4	5	6	7	8	9	10	Final
Russia (Timofeev)	1	0	1	0	0	2	0	0	1	X	5
Norway (Ulsrud) 🔨	0	2	0	1	2	0	0	2	0	X	7

Sheet D	1	2	3	4	5	6	7	8	9	10	Final
Switzerland (de Cruz) 🔨	2	1	0	0	0	3	0	1	X	X	7
Germany (Kapp)	0	0	1	1	0	0	0	0	X	X	2

Sheet E	1	2	3	4	5	6	7	8	9	10	Final
Sweden (Edin) 🔨	1	1	0	2	0	3	0	1	X	X	8
Finland (Kauste)	0	0	1	0	1	0	1	0	X	X	3

==== Draw 5 ====
Monday, November 21, 16:00

Sheet A	1	2	3	4	5	6	7	8	9	10	Final
Austria (Wunderer)	0	0	0	0	1	0	0	X	X	X	1
Norway (Ulsrud) 🔨	2	0	1	1	0	0	5	X	X	X	9

Sheet B	1	2	3	4	5	6	7	8	9	10	Final
Italy (Retornaz)	0	1	0	0	0	0	2	0	1	0	4
Sweden (Edin) 🔨	0	0	2	0	0	1	0	2	0	1	6

Sheet C	1	2	3	4	5	6	7	8	9	10	Final
Germany (Kapp) 🔨	0	0	3	2	0	0	3	X	X	X	8
Denmark (Stjerne)	0	0	0	0	0	2	0	X	X	X	2

Sheet D	1	2	3	4	5	6	7	8	9	10	Final
Finland (Kauste)	0	0	1	0	1	0	0	2	0	X	4
Russia (Timofeev) 🔨	1	2	0	2	0	0	1	0	2	X	8

Sheet E	1	2	3	4	5	6	7	8	9	10	Final
Scotland (Brewster)	0	0	2	0	0	1	0	2	0	1	6
Switzerland (de Cruz) 🔨	0	2	0	2	0	0	1	0	0	0	5

==== Draw 6 ====
Tuesday, November 22, 9:00

Sheet A	1	2	3	4	5	6	7	8	9	10	Final
Italy (Retornaz) 🔨	1	0	1	0	1	0	0	2	0	X	5
Switzerland (de Cruz)	0	1	0	2	0	4	0	0	1	X	8

Sheet B	1	2	3	4	5	6	7	8	9	10	11	Final
Norway (Ulsrud)	0	0	2	0	0	2	0	1	0	1	0	6
Germany (Kapp) 🔨	0	1	0	0	2	0	2	0	1	0	1	7

Sheet C	1	2	3	4	5	6	7	8	9	10	Final
Scotland (Brewster) 🔨	0	1	0	2	1	0	1	0	0	0	5
Finland (Kauste)	1	0	2	0	0	1	0	1	0	1	6

Sheet D	1	2	3	4	5	6	7	8	9	10	Final
Denmark (Stjerne)	0	0	0	0	2	0	1	0	X	X	3
Austria (Wunderer) 🔨	3	0	1	2	0	1	0	2	X	X	9

Sheet E	1	2	3	4	5	6	7	8	9	10	Final
Russia (Timofeev)	0	0	2	0	0	1	0	0	0	X	3
Sweden (Edin) 🔨	0	2	0	3	1	0	0	0	1	X	7

==== Draw 7 ====
Tuesday, November 22, 19:00

Sheet A	1	2	3	4	5	6	7	8	9	10	Final
Finland (Kauste)	0	0	0	1	1	0	3	0	0	0	5
Denmark (Stjerne) 🔨	0	2	0	0	0	1	0	1	1	2	7

Sheet B	1	2	3	4	5	6	7	8	9	10	Final
Russia (Timofeev)	4	0	2	0	1	0	1	0	3	X	11
Austria (Wunderer) 🔨	0	0	0	2	0	2	0	1	0	X	5

Sheet C	1	2	3	4	5	6	7	8	9	10	Final
Switzerland (de Cruz)	0	0	0	0	1	0	X	X	X	X	1
Sweden (Edin) 🔨	2	1	0	3	0	2	X	X	X	X	8

Sheet D	1	2	3	4	5	6	7	8	9	10	Final
Italy (Retornaz)	0	1	0	2	0	0	2	0	1	X	6
Norway (Ulsrud) 🔨	1	0	2	0	3	1	0	2	0	X	9

Sheet E	1	2	3	4	5	6	7	8	9	10	Final
Germany (Kapp)	0	0	0	1	0	0	1	1	0	1	4
Scotland (Brewster) 🔨	0	1	0	0	1	0	0	0	0	0	2

==== Draw 8 ====
Wednesday, November 23, 12:00

Sheet A	1	2	3	4	5	6	7	8	9	10	Final
Sweden (Edin) 🔨	0	4	0	4	0	2	X	X	X	X	10
Austria (Wunderer)	1	0	1	0	1	0	X	X	X	X	3

Sheet B	1	2	3	4	5	6	7	8	9	10	Final
Scotland (Brewster)	0	1	1	0	0	1	0	2	0	1	6
Italy (Retornaz) 🔨	0	0	0	0	1	0	2	0	1	0	4

Sheet C	1	2	3	4	5	6	7	8	9	10	Final
Denmark (Stjerne) 🔨	2	0	3	0	0	0	0	1	0	X	6
Russia (Timofeev)	0	1	0	2	1	1	1	0	2	X	8

Sheet D	1	2	3	4	5	6	7	8	9	10	11	Final
Germany (Kapp)	0	0	2	0	1	0	0	1	0	1	0	5
Finland (Kauste) 🔨	1	0	0	2	0	1	1	0	0	0	1	6

Sheet E	1	2	3	4	5	6	7	8	9	10	Final
Switzerland (de Cruz) 🔨	1	0	0	1	0	0	0	1	0	0	3
Norway (Ulsrud)	0	1	0	0	1	2	0	0	1	2	7

==== Draw 9 ====
Wednesday, November 23, 20:00

Sheet A	1	2	3	4	5	6	7	8	9	10	Final
Scotland (Brewster)	1	0	2	0	0	2	1	0	0	0	6
Russia (Timofeev) 🔨	0	2	0	2	1	0	0	1	0	2	8

Sheet B	1	2	3	4	5	6	7	8	9	10	Final
Denmark (Stjerne)	0	0	1	0	1	0	0	1	0	0	3
Switzerland (de Cruz) 🔨	0	2	0	1	0	0	0	0	0	1	4

Sheet C	1	2	3	4	5	6	7	8	9	10	Final
Finland (Kauste)	0	0	0	0	2	0	1	0	0	2	5
Italy (Retornaz) 🔨	0	2	0	0	0	1	0	0	1	0	4

Sheet D	1	2	3	4	5	6	7	8	9	10	Final
Norway (Ulsrud) 🔨	1	0	0	1	0	0	0	1	0	X	3
Sweden (Edin)	0	0	2	0	0	0	1	0	3	X	6

Sheet E	1	2	3	4	5	6	7	8	9	10	Final
Austria (Wunderer)	0	0	0	0	1	0	2	0	X	X	3
Germany (Kapp) 🔨	0	3	2	1	0	1	0	4	X	X	11

=== Placement game ===
Thursday, November 24, 14:00

Sheet D	1	2	3	4	5	6	7	8	9	10	Final
Austria (Wunderer) 🔨	1	0	2	0	1	0	0	2	1	X	7
Finland (Kauste)	0	1	0	2	0	0	2	0	0	X	5

=== World Challenge Games ===
The World Challenge Games are held between the eighth-ranked team in the Group A round robin and the winner of the Group B tournament to determine which of these two teams will play at the World Championships.

==== Challenge 1 ====
Friday, November 25, 19:00

Team	1	2	3	4	5	6	7	8	9	10	Final
Austria (Wunderer)	0	0	3	0	0	0	3	0	1	0	7
Netherlands (van Dorp) 🔨	1	0	0	1	0	1	0	2	0	1	6

==== Challenge 2 ====
Saturday, November 26, 9:00

Team	1	2	3	4	5	6	7	8	9	10	Final
Austria (Wunderer) 🔨	0	0	0	0	0	1	0	1	0	X	2
Netherlands (van Dorp)	1	1	3	1	1	0	1	0	1	X	9

==== Challenge 3 ====
Saturday, November 26, 14:00

Team	1	2	3	4	5	6	7	8	9	10	Final
Austria (Wunderer) 🔨	1	1	0	1	0	0	1	0	1	0	5
Netherlands (van Dorp)	0	0	2	0	0	1	0	2	0	1	6

=== Playoffs ===
Semifinals
1	Sweden	8
4	Russia	5
2	Norway	7
3	Switzerland	4

Final
1	Sweden	6
2	Norway	5

Bronze-medal game
4	Russia	6
3	Switzerland	8

==== Semifinals ====
Thursday, November 27, 19:00

Sheet B	1	2	3	4	5	6	7	8	9	10	Final
Sweden (Edin) 🔨	0	2	0	0	2	2	0	1	0	1	8
Russia (Timofeev)	1	0	1	0	0	0	1	0	2	0	5

Player percentages
Sweden		Russia	
Christoffer Sundgren	75%	Artur Razhabov	86%
Rasmus Wranå	96%	Timur Gadzhikhanov	85%
Oskar Eriksson	86%	Alexey Stukalskiy	88%
Niklas Edin	79%	Alexey Timofeev	75%
Total	84%	Total	83%

Sheet C	1	2	3	4	5	6	7	8	9	10	Final
Norway (Ulsrud) 🔨	3	1	0	0	0	2	0	1	0	X	7
Switzerland (de Cruz)	0	0	0	0	1	0	2	0	1	X	4

Player percentages
Norway		Switzerland	
Håvard Vad Petersson	94%	Valentin Tanner	93%
Christoffer Svae	92%	Peter de Cruz	88%
Torger Nergård	93%	Claudio Pätz	67%
Thomas Ulsrud	94%	Benoît Schwarz	75%
Total	93%	Total	81%

==== Bronze-medal game ====
Friday, November 25, 19:00

Team	1	2	3	4	5	6	7	8	9	10	Final
Russia (Timofeev)	0	2	0	1	0	1	0	0	2	0	6
Switzerland (de Cruz) 🔨	2	0	2	0	1	0	2	0	0	1	8

Player percentages
Russia		Switzerland	
Artur Razhabov	90%	Valentin Tanner	80%
Timur Gadzhikhanov	71%	Peter de Cruz	90%
Alexey Stukalskiy	76%	Claudio Pätz	80%
Alexey Timofeev	81%	Benoît Schwarz	83%
Total	80%	Total	83%

==== Gold-medal game ====
Saturday, November 26, 15:00

Team	1	2	3	4	5	6	7	8	9	10	11	Final
Sweden (Edin) 🔨	1	0	0	1	1	0	0	0	2	0	1	6
Norway (Ulsrud)	0	1	0	0	0	2	0	0	0	2	0	5

Player percentages
Sweden		Norway	
Christoffer Sundgren	82%	Håvard Vad Petersson	85%
Rasmus Wranå	80%	Christoffer Svae	83%
Oskar Eriksson	89%	Torger Nergård	86%
Niklas Edin	90%	Thomas Ulsrud	86%
Total	85%	Total	85%

=== Player percentages ===
Round Robin only

Leads	%
(Sweden) Christoffer Sundgren	88
(Russia) Artur Razhabov	86
(Switzerland) Valentin Tanner	86
(Denmark) Troels Harry	86
(Germany) Andy Kapp	85

Seconds	%
(Sweden) Rasmus Wranå	88
(Switzerland) Peter de Cruz	87
(Russia) Timur Gadzhikhanov	86
(Norway) Christoffer Svae	84
(Scotland) Ross Paterson	83

Thirds	%
(Scotland) Glen Muirhead	88
(Norway) Torger Nergård	86
(Sweden) Oskar Eriksson	86
(Switzerland) Claudio Pätz	85
(Russia) Alexey Stukalskiy	81

Skips/Fourths	%
(Sweden) Niklas Edin	89
(Norway) Thomas Ulsrud	82
(Germany) Alexander Baumann	81
(Scotland) Tom Brewster	80
(Switzerland) Benoit Schwarz	80

== Group B ==
=== Teams ===
Belgium	Czech Republic	England	Estonia
Skip: Timothy Verreycken; Third: Tom Waterschoot; Second: Gregory Janbroers; Lead: Pieter Meijlaers; Alternate: Jeroen Spruyt	Fourth: Jiří Candra; Skip: Karel Kubeška; Second: Martin Jurík; Lead: David Jirounek; Alternate: Lukáš Klíma	Skip: Alan MacDougall; Third: Andrew Reed; Second: Andrew Woolston; Lead: Thomas Jaeggi; Alternate: Ben Fowler	Skip: Martin Lill; Third: Ingar Mäesalu; Second: Johan Karlson; Lead: Tanel Toomvali
France	Hungary	Latvia	Lithuania
Skip: Jean-Olivier Biechely; Third: Louis Pizon; Second: Simon Pagnot; Lead: Sylvian Mouterde; Alternate: Theo Ducroz	Skip: Gergely Szabó; Third: Gábor Bodor; Second: Gergely Major; Lead: Gábor Szarvas; Alternate: Tamás Lados	Skip: Ritvars Gulbis; Third: Normunds Šaršūns; Second: Aivars Avotiņš; Lead: Raivis Bušmanis; Alternate: Janis Klive	Skip: Tadas Vyskupaitis; Third: Vytis Kulakauskas; Second: Laurynas Telksnys; Lead: Vidas Sadauskas; Alternate: Nerijus Pacevičius
Israel	Netherlands	Poland	Slovakia
Skip: Adam Freilich; Third: Leonid Rivkind; Second: Ariel Krasik-Geiger; Lead: Jeffrey Lutz; Alternate: Gabriel Kempenich	Skip: Jaap van Dorp; Third: Wouter Gosgen; Second: Laurens Hoekman; Lead: Carlo Glasbergen; Alternate: Lars de Boom	Skip: Borys Jasiecki; Third: Krzysztof Domin; Second: Damian Cebula; Lead: Bartosz Łobaza; Alternate: Maciej Kołodziej	Fourth: David Mišun; Third: Patrik Kaprálik; Skip: Juraj Gallo; Lead: Jakub Polák
Slovenia	Spain	Turkey	Wales
Skip: Štefan Sever; Third: Aljaž Stopar; Second: Noël Gregori; Lead: Luka Prezelj; Alternate: Gašper Stopar	Fourth: Alfonso Gracia; Skip: Lucas Munuera; Second: Rodrigo García; Lead: Óscar Tesa; Alternate: Eduardo de Paz	Skip: Alican Karataş; Third: Uğurcan Karagöz; Second: Bilal Ömer Çakır; Lead: Kadir Çakır	Skip: Adrian Meikle; Third: James Pougher; Second: Rhys Phillips; Lead: Gary Coombs; Alternate: Simon Pougher

=== Round-robin standings ===
Key
Teams to Playoffs
Teams to Tiebreaker
Teams relegated to 2016 Group C

Pool A	Skip	W	L
Czech Republic	Karel Kubeška	6	1
Israel	Adam Freilich	5	2
Slovakia	Juraj Gallo	5	2
Turkey	Alican Karataş	5	2
Wales	Adrian Meikle	4	3
Lithuania	Tadas Vyskupaitis	2	5
France	Jean-Olivier Biechely	1	6
Spain	Lucas Munuera	0	7

Pool B	Skip	W	L
Netherlands	Jaap van Dorp	6	1
Latvia	Ritvars Gulbis	5	2
Hungary	Gergely Szabó	4	3
Poland	Borys Jasiecki	4	3
England	Alan MacDougall	4	3
Belgium	Timothy Verreycken	2	5
Estonia	Martin Lill	2	5
Slovenia	Štefan Sever	1	6

=== Round-robin results ===
==== Group A ====
===== Draw 1 =====
Saturday, November 19, 9:00 & 15:00

Sheet A	1	2	3	4	5	6	7	8	9	10	Final
Israel (Freilich)	1	0	2	1	1	0	1	1	0	2	9
Slovakia (Gallo) 🔨	0	4	0	0	0	0	0	0	2	0	6

Sheet A	1	2	3	4	5	6	7	8	9	10	Final
Czech Republic (Kubeska) 🔨	3	0	0	1	0	1	0	0	2	0	7
Lithuania (Vyskupaitis)	0	0	1	0	1	0	1	0	0	2	5

Sheet B	1	2	3	4	5	6	7	8	9	10	Final
Spain (Munuera)	0	0	1	0	0	1	0	0	0	X	2
Turkey (Karataş) 🔨	1	1	0	3	1	0	2	0	1	X	9

Sheet C	1	2	3	4	5	6	7	8	9	10	11	Final
France (Biechely)	1	1	0	0	1	0	1	0	0	2	0	6
Wales (Meikle) 🔨	0	0	3	0	0	1	0	2	0	0	1	7

===== Draw 2 =====
Sunday, November 20, 8:00

Sheet B	1	2	3	4	5	6	7	8	9	10	Final
Israel (Freilich) 🔨	1	0	0	3	0	0	1	0	0	X	W
France (Biechely)	0	2	1	0	2	0	0	0	1	X	L

Sheet C	1	2	3	4	5	6	7	8	9	10	Final
Turkey (Karataş) 🔨	2	1	0	3	0	2	0	1	0	2	11
Lithuania (Vyskupaitis)	0	0	3	0	1	0	1	0	2	0	7

Sheet D	1	2	3	4	5	6	7	8	9	10	Final
Spain (Munuera)	0	0	0	0	1	0	0	2	1	X	4
Slovakia (Gallo) 🔨	3	1	2	0	0	0	3	0	0	X	9

Sheet E	1	2	3	4	5	6	7	8	9	10	Final
Wales (Meikle) 🔨	0	0	0	1	0	1	1	0	0	X	3
Czech Republic (Kubeska)	0	1	1	0	2	0	0	1	2	X	7

- In the France vs. Israel game team France ran out of time and forfeited the game.

===== Draw 3 =====
Sunday, November 20, 16:00 & Monday, November 21, 16:00 & 20:00

Sheet B	1	2	3	4	5	6	7	8	9	10	Final
Slovakia (Gallo) 🔨	0	1	0	0	0	0	1	0	0	3	5
Lithuania (Vyskupaitis)	0	0	0	0	2	0	0	1	0	0	3

Sheet E	1	2	3	4	5	6	7	8	9	10	Final
Spain (Munuera) 🔨	1	0	0	1	0	1	0	0	1	X	4
France (Biechely)	0	3	0	0	3	0	2	1	0	X	9

Sheet F	1	2	3	4	5	6	7	8	9	10	Final
Czech Republic (Kubeska) 🔨	2	0	0	1	2	0	2	2	X	X	9
Israel (Freilich)	0	0	0	0	0	1	0	0	X	X	1

Sheet F	1	2	3	4	5	6	7	8	9	10	Final
Turkey (Karataş)	0	0	0	0	3	1	0	2	0	X	6
Wales (Meikle) 🔨	0	0	0	1	0	0	0	0	2	X	3

===== Draw 4 =====
Monday, November 21, 8:00, 12:00, 16:00 & Tuesday, November 22, 12:00

Sheet A	1	2	3	4	5	6	7	8	9	10	Final
Spain (Munuera)	0	1	1	0	1	0	2	0	1	0	6
Wales (Meikle) 🔨	1	0	0	4	0	1	0	1	0	2	9

Sheet C	1	2	3	4	5	6	7	8	9	10	Final
Czech Republic (Kubeska) 🔨	0	0	3	0	0	1	0	0	0	X	4
Turkey (Karataş)	2	1	0	3	1	0	2	0	2	X	11

Sheet F	1	2	3	4	5	6	7	8	9	10	Final
France (Biechely) 🔨	0	0	2	0	0	1	0	1	X	X	4
Slovakia (Gallo)	0	1	0	3	3	0	2	0	X	X	9

Sheet E	1	2	3	4	5	6	7	8	9	10	Final
Lithuania (Vyskupaitis)	0	0	0	2	0	0	1	0	0	X	3
Israel (Freilich)	0	0	2	0	1	1	0	0	1	X	5

===== Draw 5 =====
Monday, November 21, 16:00 & Tuesday, November 22, 16:00, 20:00

Sheet D	1	2	3	4	5	6	7	8	9	10	Final
Lithuania (Vyskupaitis) 🔨	1	0	0	0	1	0	0	0	X	X	2
Wales (Meikle)	0	4	0	0	0	2	1	1	X	X	8

Sheet A	1	2	3	4	5	6	7	8	9	10	Final
Turkey (Karataş) 🔨	1	0	0	0	1	0	2	0	0	2	6
France (Biechely)	0	0	0	2	0	1	0	1	1	0	5

Sheet C	1	2	3	4	5	6	7	8	9	10	Final
Israel (Freilich)	3	0	0	2	0	2	0	0	3	X	10
Spain (Munuera)	0	1	1	0	1	0	0	1	0	X	4

Sheet F	1	2	3	4	5	6	7	8	9	10	Final
Slovakia (Gallo)	0	0	1	1	0	1	0	3	0	X	6
Czech Republic (Kubeska)	1	1	0	0	4	0	2	0	2	X	10

===== Draw 6 =====
Monday, November 21, 8:00 & Wednesday, November 23, 12:00

Sheet E	1	2	3	4	5	6	7	8	9	10	Final
France (Biechely)	0	0	0	1	1	0	1	0	X	X	3
Lithuania (Vyskupaitis) 🔨	1	1	0	0	0	5	0	2	X	X	9

Sheet B	1	2	3	4	5	6	7	8	9	10	Final
Czech Republic (Kubeska)	0	2	0	5	0	0	2	1	X	X	10
Spain (Munuera)	1	0	1	0	1	1	0	0	X	X	4

Sheet C	1	2	3	4	5	6	7	8	9	10	Final
Wales (Meikle)	1	0	2	0	1	0	0	0	0	X	4
Slovakia (Gallo)	0	2	0	1	0	1	0	1	2	X	7

Sheet D	1	2	3	4	5	6	7	8	9	10	Final
Israel (Freilich)	0	0	1	0	0	2	0	3	0	1	7
Turkey (Karataş)	0	1	0	2	1	0	1	0	1	0	6

===== Draw 7 =====
Wednesday, November 23, 20:00

Sheet B	1	2	3	4	5	6	7	8	9	10	Final
Wales (Meikle)	0	0	2	1	0	1	2	1	X	X	7
Israel (Freilich)	0	2	0	0	0	0	0	0	X	X	2

Sheet D	1	2	3	4	5	6	7	8	9	10	Final
France (Biechely)	0	0	1	0	1	0	1	0	0	X	3
Czech Republic (Kubeska)	0	1	0	3	0	2	0	1	6	X	13

Sheet E	1	2	3	4	5	6	7	8	9	10	Final
Slovakia (Gallo)	0	0	0	3	2	0	0	1	0	3	9
Turkey (Karataş)	0	0	2	0	0	1	1	0	2	0	6

Sheet F	1	2	3	4	5	6	7	8	9	10	11	Final
Lithuania (Vyskupaitis)	0	0	0	2	0	2	0	1	1	0	2	8
Spain (Munuera)	0	0	1	0	2	0	1	0	0	2	0	6

==== Group B ====
===== Draw 1 =====
Saturday, November 19, 15:00 & 20:00

Sheet D	1	2	3	4	5	6	7	8	9	10	Final
England (MacDougall) 🔨	3	4	1	0	0	2	1	0	4	X	15
Belgium (Verreycken)	0	0	0	3	1	0	0	2	0	X	6

Sheet E	1	2	3	4	5	6	7	8	9	10	Final
Latvia (Gulbis) 🔨	0	2	0	0	3	4	0	X	X	X	9
Hungary (Szabo)	0	0	0	1	0	0	1	X	X	X	2

Sheet F	1	2	3	4	5	6	7	8	9	10	Final
Netherlands (van Dorp) 🔨	0	2	0	2	2	4	0	1	X	X	11
Poland (Jasiecki)	1	0	1	0	0	0	0	0	X	X	2

Sheet F	1	2	3	4	5	6	7	8	9	10	Final
Estonia (Lill) 🔨	1	0	2	0	1	1	1	0	0	X	6
Slovenia (Sever)	0	1	0	0	0	0	0	3	0	X	4

===== Draw 2 =====
Sunday, November 20, 8:00, 12:00 & 16:00

Sheet A	1	2	3	4	5	6	7	8	9	10	Final
Belgium (Verreycken) 🔨	0	1	0	1	0	4	0	1	1	X	8
Hungary (Szabo)	0	0	4	0	1	0	0	0	0	X	5

Sheet F	1	2	3	4	5	6	7	8	9	10	Final
England (MacDougall) 🔨	0	0	1	0	0	1	0	0	X	X	2
Latvia (Gulbis)	0	1	0	2	2	0	3	2	X	X	10

Sheet A	1	2	3	4	5	6	7	8	9	10	Final
Poland (Jasiecki) 🔨	0	0	3	0	0	0	2	1	0	1	7
Slovenia (Sever)	0	0	0	0	2	1	0	0	2	0	5

Sheet C	1	2	3	4	5	6	7	8	9	10	Final
Estonia (Lill) 🔨	1	0	0	1	0	1	0	0	0	X	3
Netherlands (van Dorp)	0	0	2	0	1	0	2	1	2	X	8

===== Draw 3 =====
Monday, November 21, 8:00

Sheet B	1	2	3	4	5	6	7	8	9	10	Final
Slovenia (Sever)	1	0	1	0	0	0	X	X	X	X	2
Netherlands (van Dorp) 🔨	0	4	0	4	2	1	X	X	X	X	11

Sheet C	1	2	3	4	5	6	7	8	9	10	Final
Hungary (Szabo) 🔨	1	0	0	2	0	0	2	1	0	3	9
England (MacDougall)	0	2	2	0	2	0	0	0	2	0	8

Sheet D	1	2	3	4	5	6	7	8	9	10	11	Final
Poland (Jasiecki)	0	1	0	0	1	0	0	2	0	0	1	5
Estonia (Lill) 🔨	0	0	1	0	0	1	1	0	1	0	0	4

Sheet F	1	2	3	4	5	6	7	8	9	10	Final
Latvia (Gulbis)	1	2	0	5	0	2	0	X	X	X	10
Belgium (Verreycken)	0	0	1	0	2	0	1	X	X	X	4

===== Draw 4 =====
Monday, November 21, 16:00 & Wednesday, November 23, 16:00

Sheet A	1	2	3	4	5	6	7	8	9	10	Final
Netherlands (van Dorp) 🔨	2	0	1	0	2	2	X	X	X	X	7
Latvia (Gulbis)	0	1	0	1	0	0	X	X	X	X	2

Sheet B	1	2	3	4	5	6	7	8	9	10	Final
Poland (Jasiecki)	1	0	3	0	0	2	0	1	1	X	8
England (MacDougall) 🔨	0	1	0	1	0	0	1	0	0	X	3

Sheet E	1	2	3	4	5	6	7	8	9	10	Final
Slovenia (Sever) 🔨	1	0	0	1	0	3	1	0	0	1	7
Belgium (Verreycken)	0	0	2	0	1	0	0	1	1	0	5

Sheet E	1	2	3	4	5	6	7	8	9	10	Final
Hungary (Szabo)	0	0	2	0	2	0	2	0	2	1	9
Estonia (Lill) 🔨	1	1	0	3	0	1	0	1	0	0	7

===== Draw 5 =====
Tuesday, November 22, 8:00

Sheet A	1	2	3	4	5	6	7	8	9	10	Final
Estonia (Lill) 🔨	0	0	1	2	1	0	1	1	0	0	6
Latvia (Gulbis)	0	1	0	0	0	2	0	0	1	1	5

Sheet C	1	2	3	4	5	6	7	8	9	10	Final
England (MacDougall)	0	0	0	0	0	3	1	0	1	2	7
Slovenia (Sever) 🔨	1	0	1	0	1	0	0	0	0	0	3

Sheet D	1	2	3	4	5	6	7	8	9	10	Final
Netherlands (van Dorp) 🔨	2	0	2	0	0	0	4	0	0	X	8
Hungary (Szabo)	0	1	0	1	1	0	0	0	1	X	4

Sheet E	1	2	3	4	5	6	7	8	9	10	Final
Belgium (Verreycken)	0	0	0	1	1	0	0	0	1	0	3
Poland (Jasiecki) 🔨	2	0	0	0	0	0	1	2	0	1	6

===== Draw 6 =====
Tuesday, November 22, 16:00

Sheet B	1	2	3	4	5	6	7	8	9	10	Final
Belgium (Verreycken)	0	1	0	0	0	1	0	0	0	2	4
Estonia (Lill) 🔨	0	0	1	0	0	0	0	0	2	0	3

Sheet C	1	2	3	4	5	6	7	8	9	10	Final
Latvia (Gulbis) 🔨	4	0	0	1	0	1	0	1	0	2	9
Poland (Jasiecki)	0	1	1	0	1	0	3	0	2	0	8

Sheet E	1	2	3	4	5	6	7	8	9	10	Final
England (MacDougall) 🔨	0	2	0	1	0	0	1	0	2	X	6
Netherlands (van Dorp)	0	0	2	0	1	0	0	1	0	X	4

Sheet F	1	2	3	4	5	6	7	8	9	10	Final
Slovenia (Sever)	0	1	0	0	0	1	0	0	X	X	2
Hungary (Szabo) 🔨	0	0	0	1	4	0	3	1	X	X	9

===== Draw 7 =====
Wednesday, November 23, 8:00

Sheet B	1	2	3	4	5	6	7	8	9	10	Final
Estonia (Lill) 🔨	1	0	2	0	0	0	0	2	0	X	5
England (MacDougall)	0	2	0	0	0	3	1	0	1	X	7

Sheet C	1	2	3	4	5	6	7	8	9	10	Final
Hungary (Szabo)	0	0	1	0	1	0	2	2	0	0	6
Poland (Jasiecki) 🔨	0	1	0	1	0	1	0	0	1	1	5

Sheet E	1	2	3	4	5	6	7	8	9	10	Final
Netherlands (van Dorp) 🔨	0	2	0	1	0	3	1	0	0	X	7
Belgium (Verreycken)	1	0	1	0	2	0	0	1	0	X	5

Sheet F	1	2	3	4	5	6	7	8	9	10	Final
Latvia (Gulbis)	0	0	2	2	1	2	X	X	X	X	7
Slovenia (Sever) 🔨	0	0	0	0	0	0	X	X	X	X	0

===== Tiebreakers =====
Thursday, November 24, 9:00

Sheet H	1	2	3	4	5	6	7	8	9	10	Final
Poland (Jasiecki)	0	0	1	1	1	0	2	0	0	2	7
Hungary (Szabo) 🔨	2	0	0	0	0	1	0	0	2	0	5

Sheet K	1	2	3	4	5	6	7	8	9	10	Final
Slovakia (Gallo) 🔨	1	0	1	0	3	0	3	4	X	X	12
Turkey (Karataş)	0	2	0	1	0	2	0	0	X	X	5

=== Relegation round ===
Relegation Finals
A7	France	3
B8	Slovenia	6

Relegation Semifinals
A7	France	3
B7	Estonia	7
A8	Spain	2
B8	Slovenia	5

==== Relegation Semifinals ====
Thursday, November 24, 20:00

Sheet F	1	2	3	4	5	6	7	8	9	10	Final
France (Biechely)	0	0	1	0	1	0	0	1	0	X	3
Estonia (Lill) 🔨	0	2	0	1	0	3	0	0	1	X	7

Sheet J	1	2	3	4	5	6	7	8	9	10	Final
Spain (Munuera)	0	0	0	0	1	0	0	0	1	X	2
Slovenia (Sever) 🔨	0	1	1	0	0	0	1	2	0	X	5

==== Relegation Final ====
Friday, November 25, 19:00

Sheet G	1	2	3	4	5	6	7	8	9	10	Final
France (Biechely)	0	0	0	1	0	0	0	1	0	1	3
Slovenia (Sever) 🔨	1	0	0	0	3	0	1	0	1	0	6

=== Playoffs ===
Quarterfinals
B2	Latvia	5
A3	Slovakia	6
A2	Israel	8
B3	Poland	4

Semifinals
A1	Czech Republic	8
A3	Slovakia	9
B1	Netherlands	6
A2	Israel	2

Final
A3	Slovakia	6
B1	Netherlands	7

Bronze-medal game
A1	Czech Republic	10
A2	Israel	3

==== Quarterfinals ====
Thursday, November 24, 14:30

Sheet L	1	2	3	4	5	6	7	8	9	10	Final
Latvia (Gulbis)	0	0	1	1	0	1	0	2	0	0	5
Slovakia (Gallo) 🔨	0	1	0	0	3	0	1	0	0	1	6

Sheet G	1	2	3	4	5	6	7	8	9	10	Final
Israel (Freilich) 🔨	0	0	1	1	0	2	1	2	1	X	8
Poland (Jasiecki)	0	1	0	0	3	0	0	0	0	X	4

==== Semifinals ====
Thursday, November 24, 20:00

Sheet H	1	2	3	4	5	6	7	8	9	10	Final
Czech Republic (Kubeska) 🔨	0	3	0	1	0	3	0	1	0	0	8
Slovakia (Gallo)	2	0	1	0	1	0	1	0	3	1	9

Sheet L	1	2	3	4	5	6	7	8	9	10	Final
Netherlands (van Dorp) 🔨	0	0	3	0	1	1	0	0	1	X	6
Israel (Freilich)	0	0	0	0	0	0	2	0	0	X	2

==== Bronze-medal game ====
Friday, November 25, 13:00

Team	1	2	3	4	5	6	7	8	9	10	Final
Czech Republic (Kubeška) 🔨	1	0	4	0	2	0	2	1	X	X	10
Israel (Freilich)	0	1	0	1	0	1	0	0	X	X	3

==== Gold-medal game ====
Friday, November 25, 13:00

Team	1	2	3	4	5	6	7	8	9	10	11	Final
Slovakia (Gallo)	0	0	1	2	0	1	0	0	1	1	0	6
Netherlands (van Dorp) 🔨	1	0	0	0	3	0	1	1	0	0	1	7

== Group C ==
=== Teams ===
Andorra	Belarus	Bulgaria	Croatia
Skip: Josep Garcia; Third: Oscar Zazo; Second: Cesar Mialdea; Lead: Carles Herrero; Alternate: Jordi Montero	Skip: Ilya Shalamitski; Third: Konstantin Balakin; Second: Aliaksei Smotrin; Lead: Viktar Hilitski; Alternate: Aliaksandr Tsiushkevich	Skip: Reto Seiler; Third: Bojidar Momerin; Second: Nikolay Runtov; Lead: Petar Tchakarov; Alternate: Stanko Velinov	Skip: Robert Mikulandric; Third: Ante Baus; Second: Neven Pufnik; Lead: Dario Vukovic; Alternate: Jurica Bican
Estonia	France	Iceland	Ireland
Skip: Martin Lill; Third: Ingar Mäesalu; Second: Johan Karlson; Lead: Tanel Toomvali	Skip: Jean-Olivier Biechely; Third: Louis Pizon; Second: Simon Pagnot; Lead: Sylvain Mouterde; Alternate: Theo Ducroz	Skip: Andri Magnusson; Third: Gudmundur Olafsson; Second: Sigurjon Steinsson; Lead: Jonas Gustafsson; Alternate: Trausti Hilmisson	Skip: Andrew Gilmore; Third: Alan Mitchell; Second: Bob Sherrard; Lead: Tom Roche
Luxembourg	Romania	Serbia	
Skip: Marc Hansen; Third: Francesco Grassi; Second: Alex Benoy; Lead: Fabio Veltri; Alternate: Ian Munn	Skip: Stefan Bodea; Third: Bogdan Taut; Second: Cristian Matau; Lead: Adrian Dobos; Alternate: Gabriel Timus	Skip: Đorđe Nešković; Third: Goran Ungurović; Second: Marko Stojanović; Lead: Filip Stojanović	

=== Round-robin standings ===
Final round-robin standings

Key
Teams to Playoffs

Country	Skip	W	L
Estonia	Martin Lill	10	0
France	Jean-Olivier Biechely	7	3
Ireland	Andrew Gilmore	7	3
Bulgaria	Reto Seiler	7	3
Luxembourg	Marc Hansen	6	4
Belarus	Ilya Shalamitski	6	4
Serbia	Đorđe Nešković	5	5
Romania	Stefan Bodea	2	8
Croatia	Robert Mikulandric	2	8
Andorra	Josep Garcia	2	8
Iceland	Andri Magnusson	0	10

=== Round-robin results ===
==== Draw 1 ====
Sheet A	1	2	3	4	5	6	7	8	9	10	Final
Croatia (Mikulandrić)	0	2	4	0	2	0	2	1	0	X	11
Andorra (Garcia) 🔨	3	0	0	2	0	2	0	0	2	X	9

Sheet B	1	2	3	4	5	6	7	8	9	10	Final
Estonia (Lill) 🔨	3	0	1	0	3	1	1	1	0	X	10
Luxembourg (Hansen)	0	1	0	0	0	0	0	0	1	X	2

Sheet C	1	2	3	4	5	6	7	8	9	10	Final
Serbia (Nešković)	0	1	0	0	0	1	0	0	X	X	2
France (Biechely) 🔨	2	0	0	3	2	0	2	3	X	X	12

Sheet D	1	2	3	4	5	6	7	8	9	10	Final
Belarus (Shalamitski)	0	2	1	2	0	3	0	1	0	1	10
Romania (Bodea) 🔨	2	0	0	0	3	0	1	0	2	0	8

Sheet E	1	2	3	4	5	6	7	8	9	10	Final
Iceland (Magnusson)	0	2	0	2	0	2	0	0	0	X	6
Bulgaria (Seiler) 🔨	4	0	3	0	2	0	2	2	1	X	14

==== Draw 2 ====
Sheet A	1	2	3	4	5	6	7	8	9	10	Final
Ireland (Gilmore) 🔨	4	0	1	0	1	0	1	1	0	X	8
Serbia (Nešković)	0	1	0	1	0	1	0	0	1	X	4

Sheet B	1	2	3	4	5	6	7	8	9	10	Final
Iceland (Magnusson) 🔨	0	0	2	0	2	0	1	0	0	X	5
Andorra (Garcia)	2	1	0	3	0	1	0	4	2	X	13

Sheet C	1	2	3	4	5	6	7	8	9	10	Final
Romania (Bodea) 🔨	0	1	2	0	2	1	2	0	0	3	11
Croatia (Mikulandrić)	2	0	0	1	0	0	0	3	4	0	10

Sheet D	1	2	3	4	5	6	7	8	9	10	11	Final
France (Biechely) 🔨	0	1	0	3	2	0	2	0	0	1	2	11
Bulgaria (Seiler)	0	0	1	0	0	4	0	3	1	0	0	9

Sheet E	1	2	3	4	5	6	7	8	9	10	Final
Belarus (Shalamitski)	0	2	0	0	0	1	1	0	0	X	4
Estonia (Lill) 🔨	2	0	1	1	2	0	0	1	3	X	10

==== Draw 3 ====
Sheet A	1	2	3	4	5	6	7	8	9	10	Final
Luxembourg (Hansen)	0	3	1	1	0	4	2	0	0	1	12
Romania (Bodea) 🔨	4	0	0	0	2	0	0	1	1	0	8

Sheet B	1	2	3	4	5	6	7	8	9	10	Final
Croatia (Mikulandrić)	0	0	0	0	3	1	0	X	X	X	4
Belarus (Shalamitski) 🔨	1	2	3	2	0	0	3	X	X	X	11

Sheet C	1	2	3	4	5	6	7	8	9	10	Final
Ireland (Gilmore)	0	0	1	1	0	0	1	0	X	X	3
Estonia (Lill) 🔨	2	1	0	0	0	5	0	2	X	X	10

Sheet D	1	2	3	4	5	6	7	8	9	10	Final
Iceland (Magnusson)	0	1	0	0	0	0	1	X	X	X	2
Serbia (Nešković) 🔨	1	0	2	3	3	2	0	X	X	X	11

Sheet E	1	2	3	4	5	6	7	8	9	10	Final
Andorra (Garcia)	1	0	0	0	0	2	X	X	X	X	3
France (Biechely) 🔨	0	5	4	3	3	0	X	X	X	X	15

==== Draw 4 ====
Sheet A	1	2	3	4	5	6	7	8	9	10	Final
Belarus (Shalamitski) 🔨	0	0	2	3	1	1	3	0	2	X	12
Iceland (Magnusson)	3	1	0	0	0	0	0	2	0	X	6

Sheet B	1	2	3	4	5	6	7	8	9	10	Final
Romania (Bodea) 🔨	1	0	0	1	0	0	1	0	0	X	3
France (Biechely)	0	2	0	0	3	1	0	1	2	X	9

Sheet C	1	2	3	4	5	6	7	8	9	10	Final
Bulgaria (Seiler) 🔨	0	3	1	2	0	0	1	0	0	X	7
Luxembourg (Hansen)	1	0	0	0	1	4	0	2	1	X	9

Sheet D	1	2	3	4	5	6	7	8	9	10	Final
Estonia (Lill) 🔨	0	0	2	0	3	1	0	0	2	1	9
Andorra (Garcia)	0	1	0	1	0	0	2	3	0	0	7

Sheet E	1	2	3	4	5	6	7	8	9	10	Final
Croatia (Mikulandrić) 🔨	1	0	1	1	0	0	0	0	X	X	3
Ireland (Gilmore)	0	3	0	0	1	2	1	1	X	X	8

==== Draw 5 ====
Sheet A	1	2	3	4	5	6	7	8	9	10	Final
Estonia (Lill)	1	0	1	0	4	0	3	X	X	X	9
France (Biechely) 🔨	0	0	0	1	0	1	0	X	X	X	2

Sheet B	1	2	3	4	5	6	7	8	9	10	Final
Ireland (Gilmore)	0	0	0	1	1	1	0	0	1	0	4
Bulgaria (Seiler) 🔨	0	0	2	0	0	0	0	3	0	1	6

Sheet C	1	2	3	4	5	6	7	8	9	10	Final
Belarus (Shalamitski) 🔨	3	0	2	1	0	0	2	3	X	X	11
Andorra (Garcia)	0	1	0	0	2	0	0	0	X	X	3

Sheet D	1	2	3	4	5	6	7	8	9	10	Final
Luxembourg (Hansen) 🔨	0	0	3	1	0	0	3	1	1	1	10
Croatia (Mikulandrić)	1	1	0	0	4	2	0	0	0	0	8

Sheet E	1	2	3	4	5	6	7	8	9	10	Final
Romania (Bodea)	0	0	4	0	2	1	0	0	1	3	11
Serbia (Nešković) 🔨	3	2	0	1	0	0	3	1	0	0	10

==== Draw 6 ====
Sheet A	1	2	3	4	5	6	7	8	9	10	Final
Andorra (Garcia) 🔨	1	0	1	0	1	0	0	X	X	X	3
Bulgaria (Seiler)	0	4	0	4	0	3	1	X	X	X	12

Sheet B	1	2	3	4	5	6	7	8	9	10	11	Final
Serbia (Nešković)	0	1	0	0	0	0	3	0	0	1	0	5
Estonia (Lill) 🔨	1	0	0	1	1	1	0	0	1	0	1	6

Sheet C	1	2	3	4	5	6	7	8	9	10	Final
Iceland (Magnusson)	0	0	1	1	0	0	0	0	0	X	2
Romania (Bodea) 🔨	1	0	0	0	1	2	0	2	2	X	8

Sheet D	1	2	3	4	5	6	7	8	9	10	Final
Ireland (Gilmore) 🔨	0	1	0	1	0	1	0	0	3	X	6
France (Biechely)	0	0	2	0	1	0	0	0	0	X	3

Sheet E	1	2	3	4	5	6	7	8	9	10	Final
Luxembourg (Hansen)	2	0	1	3	0	1	0	2	3	X	12
Belarus (Shalamitski) 🔨	0	1	0	0	4	0	2	0	0	X	7

==== Draw 7 ====
Sheet A	1	2	3	4	5	6	7	8	9	10	Final
Serbia (Nešković)	3	0	3	0	2	2	1	0	X	X	11
Croatia (Mikulandrić) 🔨	0	2	0	2	0	0	0	1	X	X	5

Sheet B	1	2	3	4	5	6	7	8	9	10	11	Final
Andorra (Garcia)	1	0	0	0	3	0	1	0	4	2	1	12
Romania (Bodea) 🔨	0	3	1	3	0	3	0	1	0	0	0	11

Sheet C	1	2	3	4	5	6	7	8	9	10	Final
Luxembourg (Hansen)	1	1	0	1	0	1	0	3	1	0	8
Ireland (Gilmore) 🔨	0	0	2	0	3	0	2	0	0	2	9

Sheet D	1	2	3	4	5	6	7	8	9	10	Final
Bulgaria (Seiler) 🔨	1	0	1	0	2	0	2	0	0	X	6
Estonia (Lill)	0	2	0	2	0	1	0	2	3	X	10

Sheet E	1	2	3	4	5	6	7	8	9	10	Final
France (Biechely) 🔨	2	3	3	0	1	3	1	X	X	X	13
Iceland (Magnusson)	0	0	0	1	0	0	0	X	X	X	1

==== Draw 8 ====
Sheet A	1	2	3	4	5	6	7	8	9	10	11	Final
Romania (Bodea)	0	1	2	1	0	2	2	0	0	1	0	9
Estonia (Lill) 🔨	1	0	0	0	2	0	0	3	3	0	1	10

Sheet B	1	2	3	4	5	6	7	8	9	10	Final
Luxembourg (Hansen) 🔨	1	4	4	1	1	2	1	X	X	X	14
Iceland (Magnusson)	0	0	0	0	0	0	0	X	X	X	0

Sheet C	1	2	3	4	5	6	7	8	9	10	Final
Croatia (Mikulandrić)	1	1	0	2	0	2	0	0	X	X	6
Bulgaria (Seiler) 🔨	0	0	2	0	7	0	2	4	X	X	15

Sheet D	1	2	3	4	5	6	7	8	9	10	Final
Serbia (Nešković)	0	1	1	0	1	3	4	0	1	X	11
Belarus (Shalamitski)	0	0	0	1	0	0	0	2	0	X	3

Sheet E	1	2	3	4	5	6	7	8	9	10	Final
Ireland (Gilmore) 🔨	0	1	1	2	2	4	2	X	X	X	12
Andorra (Garcia)	1	0	0	0	0	0	0	X	X	X	1

==== Draw 9 ====
Sheet A	1	2	3	4	5	6	7	8	9	10	Final
Bulgaria (Seiler) 🔨	0	1	3	0	2	0	1	1	0	1	9
Belarus (Shalamitski)	0	0	0	1	0	1	0	0	4	0	6

Sheet B	1	2	3	4	5	6	7	8	9	10	Final
France (Biechely)	1	2	0	2	4	1	0	X	X	X	10
Croatia (Mikulandrić) 🔨	0	0	1	0	0	0	1	X	X	X	2

Sheet C	1	2	3	4	5	6	7	8	9	10	Final
Estonia (Lill) 🔨	2	3	3	0	0	2	1	1	X	X	12
Iceland (Magnusson)	0	0	0	1	2	0	0	0	X	X	3

Sheet D	1	2	3	4	5	6	7	8	9	10	Final
Romania (Bodea)	0	0	1	0	1	0	2	0	0	X	4
Ireland (Gilmore) 🔨	2	1	0	2	0	2	0	1	2	X	10

Sheet E	1	2	3	4	5	6	7	8	9	10	Final
Serbia (Nešković) 🔨	0	1	1	0	3	2	0	0	1	X	8
Luxembourg (Hansen)	2	0	0	1	0	0	1	1	0	X	5

==== Draw 10 ====
Sheet A	1	2	3	4	5	6	7	8	9	10	Final
France (Biechely) 🔨	1	2	0	4	0	1	0	1	1	X	10
Luxembourg (Hansen)	0	0	1	0	1	0	1	0	0	X	3

Sheet B	1	2	3	4	5	6	7	8	9	10	Final
Belarus (Shalamitski)	1	1	0	1	0	1	1	0	0	1	6
Ireland (Gilmore) 🔨	0	0	1	0	1	0	0	1	1	0	4

Sheet C	1	2	3	4	5	6	7	8	9	10	Final
Andorra (Garcia) 🔨	1	0	1	0	0	0	2	0	X	X	4
Serbia (Nešković)	0	5	0	1	2	2	0	3	X	X	13

Sheet D	1	2	3	4	5	6	7	8	9	10	Final
Croatia (Mikulandrić)	0	1	1	2	0	0	0	3	0	1	8
Iceland (Magnusson) 🔨	1	0	0	0	2	1	2	0	1	0	7

Sheet E	1	2	3	4	5	6	7	8	9	10	Final
Bulgaria (Seiler) 🔨	3	0	0	2	2	1	0	4	X	X	12
Romania (Bodea)	0	1	1	0	0	0	2	0	X	X	4

==== Draw 11 ====
Sheet A	1	2	3	4	5	6	7	8	9	10	Final
Iceland (Magnusson)	1	1	0	0	1	0	0	2	0	X	5
Ireland (Gilmore) 🔨	0	0	2	0	0	2	1	0	3	X	8

Sheet B	1	2	3	4	5	6	7	8	9	10	Final
Bulgaria (Seiler)	2	0	2	0	1	0	1	1	0	X	7
Serbia (Nešković) 🔨	0	2	0	0	0	2	0	0	1	X	5

Sheet C	1	2	3	4	5	6	7	8	9	10	Final
France (Biechely)	0	1	0	1	0	1	0	0	X	X	3
Belarus (Shalamitski) 🔨	1	0	3	0	1	0	1	4	X	X	10

Sheet D	1	2	3	4	5	6	7	8	9	10	Final
Andorra (Garcia)	0	0	1	1	3	0	0	1	0	X	6
Luxembourg (Hansen) 🔨	2	1	0	0	0	3	4	0	3	X	13

Sheet E	1	2	3	4	5	6	7	8	9	10	Final
Estonia (Lill) 🔨	3	0	0	2	1	0	0	1	0	0	7
Croatia (Mikulandrić)	0	1	3	0	0	1	0	0	1	0	6

=== Playoffs ===
Second Place Game
2	France	7
3	Ireland	6

Semifinals
1	Estonia	7
2	France	4
3	Ireland	9
4	Bulgaria	6

==== 1 vs. 2 ====
Team	1	2	3	4	5	6	7	8	9	10	Final
Estonia (Lill) 🔨	0	1	0	0	2	0	0	4	0	X	7
France (Biechely)	0	0	1	0	0	1	1	0	1	X	4

Winner advances to Group B competitions.
Loser advances to Second Place Game.

==== 3 vs. 4 ====
Team	1	2	3	4	5	6	7	8	9	10	11	Final
Ireland (Gilmore)	1	2	0	0	2	0	0	1	0	0	3	9
Bulgaria (Seiler) 🔨	0	0	2	0	0	0	1	0	2	1	0	6

Winner advances to Second Place Game.

==== Second Place Game ====
Team	1	2	3	4	5	6	7	8	9	10	Final
France (Biechely)	0	0	0	2	2	1	0	0	2	0	7
Ireland (Gilmore) 🔨	0	0	3	0	0	0	1	1	0	1	6

Winner advances to Group B competitions.
