= Benoît Schwarz-van Berkel =

Swiss curler (born 1991)

- Curler
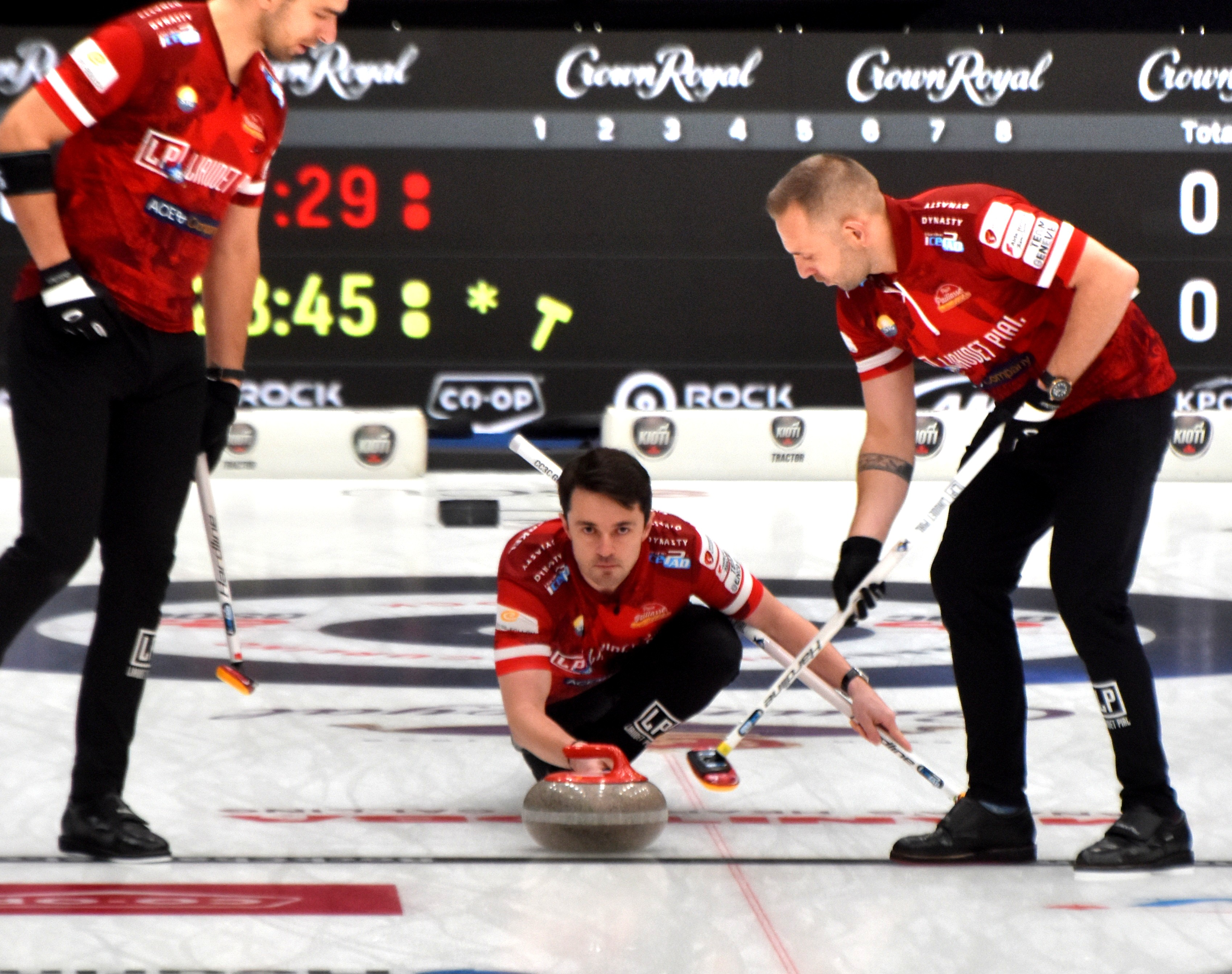
- Schwarz-van Berkel at the 2026 Players' Championship
- Born: Benoît Schwarz; 19 August 1991 (age 35); Geneva, Switzerland

Team
- Curling club: CC Genève; Geneva, SUI
- Skip: Yannick Schwaller
- Fourth: Benoît Schwarz-van Berkel
- Second: Sven Michel
- Lead: Pablo Lachat-Couchepin
- Alternate: Kim Schwaller
- Mixed doubles partner: Carole Howald

Curling career
- Member Association: Switzerland
- World Championship: 9 (2012, 2013, 2014, 2017, 2019, 2021, 2023, 2024, 2025)
- European Championship: 11 (2011, 2013, 2015, 2016, 2017, 2018, 2021, 2022, 2023, 2024, 2025)
- Olympic: 4 (2014, 2018, 2022, 2026)
- Grand Slam victories: 3 (2018 Canadian Open, 2025 Canadian Open, 2026 Invitational)
Medal record
Men's curling
Representing Switzerland
Olympic Games
Bronze medal – third place	2018 Pyeongchang	Team
Bronze medal – third place	2026 Milano Cortina	Team
World Championships
Silver medal – second place	2025 Moose Jaw
Bronze medal – third place	2014 Beijing
Bronze medal – third place	2017 Edmonton
Bronze medal – third place	2019 Lethbridge
Bronze medal – third place	2021 Calgary
Bronze medal – third place	2023 Ottawa
European Championships
Gold medal – first place	2013 Stavanger
Silver medal – second place	2015 Esbjerg
Silver medal – second place	2022 Östersund
Silver medal – second place	2025 Lohja
Bronze medal – third place	2016 Renfrewshire
Bronze medal – third place	2017 St Gallen
Bronze medal – third place	2023 Aberdeen
World Junior Championships
Gold medal – first place	2010 Flims
Silver medal – second place	2011 Perth

Benoît François Dominique Schwarz-van Berkel (né Schwarz; born 19 August 1991) is a Swiss curler. He currently throws fourth stones for skip Yannick Schwaller. He is a World Junior Champion, won a gold medal with the Swiss team at the 2013 European Curling Championships in Stavanger, and also has three Grand Slam of Curling titles at the Canadian Open in 2018 and 2025 and the 2026 Invitational. Schwarz-van Berkel has also earned multiple medals at both the European Curling Championship and World Men's Curling Championship, and was part of the bronze medal-winning Swiss team at the 2018 Winter Olympics and 2026 Winter Olympics.

== Career ==
=== Juniors ===
Schwarz-van Berkel began his international career representing Switzerland at the 2010 World Junior Curling Championships, as the fourth rock thrower on a team skipped by Peter de Cruz. At Schwarz-van Berkel's first international event, the team went 7–2 in the round robin, and would go on to win the championship, beating Scotland's Ally Fraser 7–6 in the final. Schwarz-van Berkel would return to the 2011 World Junior Curling Championships with de Cruz, where the team would fail to defend their title, losing 6–5 to Sweden's Oskar Eriksson in the final. Schwarz-van Berkel would make his final World Junior appearance as an alternate for the Dominik Märki rink in 2012, where the team would finish 5–4, finishing 6th and failing to qualify for the playoffs.

=== Men's ===
==== Alternate for Team Michel (2011–2014) ====
Schwarz-van Berkel would make his international men's debut at the 2011 European Curling Championships as the alternate for Sven Michel's rink. At the European's, the Swiss team finished 6th with a 5–4 record. Schwarz-van Berkel would again be the alternate for Michel's rink at the 2013 European Curling Championship, where he would win his first European Championship, winning against Norway's Thomas Ulsrud 8–6 in the final. As the alternate for the Michel rink, he would represent Switzerland at the 2014 Winter Olympics, where the team went 3–6 in the round robin, finishing 8th.

==== Team de Cruz (2014–2022) ====
Schwarz-van Berkel would join the Peter de Cruz rink as their fourth rock thrower starting in 2014, curling alongside Dominik Märki and Valentin Tanner. They would represent Switzerland at the 2014 World Men's Curling Championship, where the team finished 3rd, beating Canada's Kevin Koe 7–5 in the bronze medal game. After one year together, Märki and de Cruz rink would split, and Claudio Pätz would replace Mäki at third. The de Cruz rink would represent Switzerland at the 2015 European Curling Championships, where the team would finish second, losing to Sweden's Niklas Edin 7–6 in the final. de Cruz would be unable to defend their Swiss Men's National Championship title in 2015, losing to eventual champions Marc Pfister in the semifinals.

Team de Cruz would be chosen by Swiss Curling to represent Switzerland at the 2016 European Curling Championship, where they would win bronze, beating Russia's Alexey Timofeev 8–6 in the bronze medal game. de Cruz would finally win the 2017 Switzerland Men's Curling Championship against Felix Attinger, qualifying them to represent Switzerland at the 2017 World Men's Curling Championship. At the 2017 World Championships, de Cruz would go 8–3 in round robin play, and win a bronze medal, beating John Shuster from the United States 7–5 in the bronze medal game. de Cruz would again be chosen to represent Switzerland at the 2017 European Curling Championships on home soil in St. Gallen. de Cruz would again win bronze at the Europeans, this time beating Norway's Ulsrud 6–5 in the bronze medal game. de Cruz would also win their first Grand Slam of Curling title, winning the 2018 Meridian Canadian Open 4–3 against Edin in the final. Shortly after winning their first Grand Slam, de Cruz would also represent Switzerland at the 2018 Winter Olympics. At the 2018 Olympics, the de Cruz team had a strong showing, where they won an Olympic bronze medal, beating Canada's Koe 7–5 in the bronze medal game.

At the beginning of the 2018–19 season, Pätz and the de Cruz rink announced they would be parting ways, with long-time national rival Sven Michel joining the team and throwing third rocks. At the 2018 European Curling Championships, the new de Cruz team would finish 6th, completing the round robin with a 5–4 record. The new de Cruz team would also go on to beat Yannick Schwaller in the final of the 2019 Swiss Men's Curling Championship, qualifying de Cruz to represent Switzerland at the 2019 World Men's Curling Championship. At the 2019 World Championship, they had a strong showing, winning bronze after beating Japan's Yuta Matsumura 8–4 in the bronze medal game.

After the World Championships were cancelled in 2020 due to the COVID-19 pandemic, the de Cruz rink would return to represent Switzerland at the 2021 World Men's Curling Championship, once again winning a bronze medal, beating RCF's Sergey Glukhov 6–5 in the bronze medal game. Team de Cruz would compete at the 2021 European Curling Championships, where they would finish 5th, finishing round robin play with a 5–4 record. de Cruz would also win the 2021 Swiss Olympic curling trials and represent Switzerland at the 2022 Winter Olympics, Schwarz-van Berkel's third Olympics. At the 2022 Olympics, the Swiss would finish in 7th place with a 4–5 record.

==== Team Schwaller (2022–present) ====
In April 2022, it was announced that Schwarz-van Berkel and Michel would be joining a new team skipped by Yannick Schwaller and Pablo Lachat for the 2022–23 season. Schwaller would skip the team but throw third rocks with Schwarz-van Berkel throwing fourth rocks, Michel playing second, and Lachat at lead. The new Schwaller rink would represent Switzerland at the 2022 European Curling Championships, where they would go 8–1 in the round robin, but lose to Scotland's Bruce Mouat 5–4 in the final, winning the silver medal. Schwaller would go on to represent Switzerland at the 2023 World Men's Curling Championship, where they would win a bronze medal, beating Italy's Joël Retornaz 11–3 in the bronze medal game. Schwaller would again represent Switzerland at the 2023 European Curling Championships, once again winning a bronze medal over Italy's Retornaz, this time by a score of 8–4 in the bronze medal game. At the 2024 World Men's Curling Championship, the Swiss team would finish a disappointing 7th, going 6–6 in round robin play. However, Schwaller would have a strong season on the Grand Slam of Curling tour, finishing in the semifinals of both the 2023 National and 2023 Masters.

Schwaller would again have a strong start to the 2024–25 curling season. At the Grand Slam events, Schwaller would finish in the quarterfinals of the 2024 Tour Challenge and semifinalists at the 2024 Canadian Open. At the 2024 European Curling Championships, the team would finish 4th, losing to Norway's Magnus Ramsfjell in the bronze medal game. The Schwaller rink would return to the 2025 World Men's Curling Championship, where they would go 9–3 in the round robin, but lose in the final to Scotland's Mouat 5–4, finishing in second and winning the silver medal.

== Personal life ==
Schwarz-van Berkel is married to Swiss swimmer, Martina van Berkel, and is a former business administration student. He currently resides in Bülach.

== Grand Slam record ==
Key
C	Champion
F	Lost in Final
SF	Lost in Semifinal
QF	Lost in Quarterfinals
R16	Lost in the round of 16
Q	Did not advance to playoffs
T2	Played in Tier 2 event
DNP	Did not participate in event
N/A	Not a Grand Slam event that season

Event	2012–13	2013–14	2014–15	2015–16	2016–17	2017–18	2018–19	2019–20	2020–21	2021–22	2022–23	2023–24	2024–25	2025–26	2026–27
Invitational	N/A	N/A	N/A	Q	DNP	Q	SF	Q	N/A	N/A	QF	QF	QF	QF	C
Masters	Q	DNP	Q	DNP	Q	QF	DNP	Q	N/A	Q	QF	SF	QF	QF	SF
National	Q	DNP	Q	DNP	Q	DNP	Q	QF	N/A	SF	Q	SF	Q	SF	F
Open	Q	Q	DNP	DNP	DNP	C	Q	Q	N/A	N/A	QF	QF	SF	C	
Players'	DNP	DNP	DNP	DNP	QF	DNP	SF	N/A	Q	DNP	F	Q	F	SF	
Champions Cup	N/A	N/A	N/A	Q	QF	DNP	DNP	N/A	Q	DNP	DNP	N/A	N/A	N/A	N/A
Elite 10	N/A	N/A	DNP	DNP	QF	DNP	DNP	N/A	N/A	N/A	N/A	N/A	N/A	N/A	N/A
