= 2013 European Curling Championships – Men's tournament =

2013 European Curling Championships Men's tournament
- Host city: Stavanger, Norway
- Arena: Sørmarka Arena
- Dates: November 22–30
- Winner: Switzerland
- Curling club: CC Adelboden, Adelboden
- Skip: Sven Michel
- Third: Claudio Pätz
- Second: Sandro Trolliet
- Lead: Simon Gempeler
- Alternate: Benoît Schwarz
- Finalist: Norway (Thomas Ulsrud)

The men's tournament of the 2013 European Curling Championships will be held from November 22 to 30 at the Sørmarka Arena in Stavanger, Norway. The winners of the Group C tournament in Tårnby, Denmark will move on to the Group B tournament. The top eight men's teams at the 2013 European Curling Championships will represent their respective nations at the 2014 World Men's Curling Championship in Beijing, China.

== Group A ==
=== Teams ===
The teams are listed as follows:

Czech Republic	Denmark	Finland	France	Latvia
Skip: Jiří Snítil; Third: Martin Snítil; Second: Jindřich Kitzberger; Lead: Marek Vydra; Alternate: Jakub Bareš	Skip: Rasmus Stjerne; Third: Johnny Frederiksen; Second: Mikkel Poulsen; Lead: Troels Harry; Alternate: Lars Vilandt	Fourth: Toni Anttila; Skip: Tomi Rantamäki; Second: Pekka Peura; Lead: Jermu Pöllänen; Alternate: Kimmo Ilvonen	Skip: Joffrey Vincent; Third: Guillaume Vincent; Second: Frédéric Buttoudin; Lead: Rodolphe Vincent; Alternate: Tom Berrin	Skip: Ritvars Gulbis; Third: Normunds Šaršūns; Second: Aivars Avotiņš; Lead: Artūrs Gerhards; Alternate: Raivis Bušmanis
Norway	Russia	Scotland	Sweden	Switzerland
Skip: Thomas Ulsrud; Third: Torger Nergård; Second: Christoffer Svae; Lead: Håvard Vad Petersson; Alternate: Markus Høiberg	Skip: Andrey Drozdov; Third: Evgeniy Arkhipov; Second: Alexey Stukalskiy; Lead: Petr Dron; Alternate: Alexander Kozyrev	Skip: David Murdoch; Third: Greg Drummond; Second: Scott Andrews; Lead: Michael Goodfellow; Alternate: Tom Brewster	Skip: Niklas Edin; Third: Sebastian Kraupp; Second: Fredrik Lindberg; Lead: Viktor Kjäll; Alternate: Oskar Eriksson	Skip: Sven Michel; Third: Claudio Pätz; Second: Sandro Trolliet; Lead: Simon Gempeler; Alternate: Benoît Schwarz

=== Round-robin standings ===
Final round-robin standings

Key
Teams to Playoffs
Countries relegated to 2014 Group B

Country	Skip	W	L	PF	PA	Ends Won	Ends Lost	Blank Ends	Stolen Ends	Shot Pct.
Norway	Thomas Ulsrud	8	1	66	38	41	31	8	14	88%
Switzerland	Sven Michel	7	2	66	46	39	34	11	8	83%
Denmark	Rasmus Stjerne	7	2	62	38	35	30	11	11	83%
Scotland	David Murdoch	7	2	68	48	40	31	7	10	82%
Sweden	Niklas Edin	5	4	54	48	33	34	13	7	83%
Russia	Andrey Drozdov	4	5	48	52	35	33	13	8	80%
Czech Republic	Jiří Snítil	3	6	50	61	33	41	8	3	72%
Latvia	Ritvars Gulbis	2	7	45	62	35	39	7	7	70%
France	Joffrey Vincent	1	8	32	76	29	37	6	6	63%
Finland	Tomi Rantamäki	1	8	52	74	34	44	8	7	72%

=== Round-robin results ===
==== Draw 1 ====
Saturday, November 23, 8:00

Sheet A	1	2	3	4	5	6	7	8	9	10	Final
France (Vincent) 🔨	0	0	1	0	1	0	1	0	X	X	3
Switzerland (Michel)	1	2	0	1	0	4	0	5	X	X	13

Sheet B	1	2	3	4	5	6	7	8	9	10	Final
Scotland (Murdoch)	0	1	1	1	0	1	0	2	0	X	6
Denmark (Stjerne) 🔨	3	0	0	0	2	0	4	0	1	X	10

Sheet C	1	2	3	4	5	6	7	8	9	10	Final
Russia (Drozdov) 🔨	0	1	1	1	0	0	1	1	0	2	7
Finland (Rantamäki)	0	0	0	0	2	1	0	0	1	0	4

Sheet D	1	2	3	4	5	6	7	8	9	10	Final
Czech Republic (Snítil)	0	0	1	0	0	1	0	X	X	X	2
Sweden (Edin) 🔨	0	2	0	1	3	0	2	X	X	X	8

Sheet E	1	2	3	4	5	6	7	8	9	10	Final
Norway (Ulsrud) 🔨	0	2	1	0	3	0	1	0	0	X	7
Latvia (Gulbis)	0	0	0	1	0	1	0	1	0	X	4

==== Draw 2 ====
Saturday, November 23, 19:30

Sheet A	1	2	3	4	5	6	7	8	9	10	Final
Denmark (Stjerne)	0	1	0	1	0	0	3	0	1	X	6
Czech Republic (Snítil) 🔨	1	0	1	0	1	0	0	1	0	X	4

Sheet B	1	2	3	4	5	6	7	8	9	10	Final
Switzerland (Michel)	0	1	0	0	2	0	0	1	1	0	5
Sweden (Edin) 🔨	1	0	2	1	0	1	0	0	0	1	6

Sheet C	1	2	3	4	5	6	7	8	9	10	Final
Norway (Ulsrud) 🔨	3	2	2	0	2	0	X	X	X	X	9
France (Vincent)	0	0	0	2	0	1	X	X	X	X	3

Sheet D	1	2	3	4	5	6	7	8	9	10	11	Final
Latvia (Gulbis) 🔨	1	1	0	1	0	1	2	1	0	0	1	8
Finland (Rantamäki)	0	0	2	0	2	0	0	0	1	2	0	7

Sheet E	1	2	3	4	5	6	7	8	9	10	Final
Scotland (Murdoch) 🔨	0	2	0	2	0	2	1	0	X	X	7
Russia (Drozdov)	0	0	1	0	1	0	0	1	X	X	3

==== Draw 3 ====
Sunday, November 24, 12:00

Sheet A	1	2	3	4	5	6	7	8	9	10	Final
Finland (Rantamäki)	0	1	0	0	2	0	1	0	X	X	4
Scotland (Murdoch) 🔨	0	0	2	3	0	3	0	1	X	X	9

Sheet B	1	2	3	4	5	6	7	8	9	10	Final
France (Vincent)	1	1	0	2	0	1	0	0	1	X	6
Latvia (Gulbis) 🔨	0	0	1	0	3	0	2	2	0	X	8

Sheet C	1	2	3	4	5	6	7	8	9	10	Final
Switzerland (Michel) 🔨	0	1	1	1	0	1	0	0	1	X	5
Czech Republic (Snítil)	0	0	0	0	1	0	0	2	0	X	3

Sheet D	1	2	3	4	5	6	7	8	9	10	Final
Russia (Drozdov) 🔨	0	1	0	0	0	1	0	0	X	X	2
Norway (Ulsrud)	1	0	1	2	1	0	1	1	X	X	7

Sheet E	1	2	3	4	5	6	7	8	9	10	Final
Denmark (Stjerne) 🔨	0	2	1	2	0	2	2	X	X	X	9
Sweden (Edin)	0	0	0	0	3	0	0	X	X	X	3

==== Draw 4 ====
Sunday, November 24, 20:00

Sheet A	1	2	3	4	5	6	7	8	9	10	11	Final
Sweden (Edin)	0	1	0	1	2	0	1	0	0	1	0	6
Norway (Ulsrud) 🔨	1	0	2	0	0	1	0	0	2	0	1	7

Sheet B	1	2	3	4	5	6	7	8	9	10	Final
Russia (Drozdov) 🔨	1	0	0	2	0	0	2	1	0	0	6
Czech Republic (Snítil)	0	0	3	0	0	2	0	0	1	2	8

Sheet C	1	2	3	4	5	6	7	8	9	10	Final
Latvia (Gulbis)	0	0	0	1	0	0	1	X	X	X	2
Denmark (Stjerne) 🔨	2	1	1	0	2	0	0	X	X	X	6

Sheet D	1	2	3	4	5	6	7	8	9	10	Final
Finland (Rantamäki)	0	0	1	1	0	2	0	1	0	0	5
France (Vincent) 🔨	2	1	0	0	1	0	1	0	0	1	6

Sheet E	1	2	3	4	5	6	7	8	9	10	Final
Switzerland (Michel)	1	0	0	0	2	0	2	0	3	X	8
Scotland (Murdoch) 🔨	0	1	1	0	0	2	0	2	0	X	6

==== Draw 5 ====
Monday, November 25, 14:00

Sheet A	1	2	3	4	5	6	7	8	9	10	Final
Russia (Drozdov) 🔨	0	0	2	0	0	0	1	0	1	X	4
Denmark (Stjerne)	0	0	0	2	1	0	0	4	0	X	7

Sheet B	1	2	3	4	5	6	7	8	9	10	Final
Norway (Ulsrud)	0	0	1	0	2	3	0	1	0	1	8
Switzerland (Michel) 🔨	0	2	0	1	0	0	1	0	2	0	6

Sheet C	1	2	3	4	5	6	7	8	9	10	Final
France (Vincent) 🔨	0	0	0	0	1	0	1	0	0	X	2
Sweden (Edin)	0	1	0	1	0	2	0	2	0	X	6

Sheet D	1	2	3	4	5	6	7	8	9	10	Final
Scotland (Murdoch) 🔨	0	0	2	0	2	0	0	1	0	2	7
Latvia (Gulbis)	1	0	0	2	0	1	1	0	1	0	6

Sheet E	1	2	3	4	5	6	7	8	9	10	11	Final
Czech Republic (Snítil) 🔨	1	0	2	0	3	0	1	0	0	2	0	9
Finland (Rantamäki)	0	2	0	1	0	3	0	2	1	0	2	11

==== Draw 6 ====
Tuesday, November 26, 8:00

Sheet A	1	2	3	4	5	6	7	8	9	10	Final
Norway (Ulsrud)	0	3	1	1	2	0	3	X	X	X	10
Finland (Rantamäki) 🔨	2	0	0	0	0	2	0	X	X	X	4

Sheet B	1	2	3	4	5	6	7	8	9	10	Final
Denmark (Stjerne)	1	1	0	3	0	4	X	X	X	X	9
France (Vincent) 🔨	0	0	1	0	1	0	X	X	X	X	2

Sheet C	1	2	3	4	5	6	7	8	9	10	Final
Czech Republic (Snítil) 🔨	1	0	1	0	0	2	0	1	0	X	5
Scotland (Murdoch)	0	2	0	3	1	0	2	0	1	X	9

Sheet D	1	2	3	4	5	6	7	8	9	10	Final
Sweden (Edin)	0	0	0	1	0	2	0	2	0	0	5
Russia (Drozdov) 🔨	0	1	1	0	1	0	1	0	0	2	6

Sheet E	1	2	3	4	5	6	7	8	9	10	Final
Latvia (Gulbis)	0	0	1	1	0	0	1	0	3	0	6
Switzerland (Michel) 🔨	0	1	0	0	3	0	0	2	0	1	7

==== Draw 7 ====
Tuesday, November 26, 16:00

Sheet A	1	2	3	4	5	6	7	8	9	10	Final
Scotland (Murdoch) 🔨	1	0	0	2	0	5	0	0	1	X	9
Sweden (Edin)	0	0	2	0	2	0	0	1	0	X	5

Sheet B	1	2	3	4	5	6	7	8	9	10	Final
Latvia (Gulbis)	0	0	1	0	1	0	1	0	1	X	4
Russia (Drozdov) 🔨	3	1	0	2	0	0	0	1	0	X	7

Sheet C	1	2	3	4	5	6	7	8	9	10	Final
Finland (Rantamäki)	0	0	3	0	1	0	0	2	0	1	7
Switzerland (Michel) 🔨	0	1	0	1	0	2	4	0	1	0	9

Sheet D	1	2	3	4	5	6	7	8	9	10	Final
Norway (Ulsrud) 🔨	2	1	1	0	0	2	0	0	1	X	7
Denmark (Stjerne)	0	0	0	0	1	0	1	1	0	X	3

Sheet E	1	2	3	4	5	6	7	8	9	10	Final
France (Vincent) 🔨	1	0	1	0	1	0	1	1	1	0	6
Czech Republic (Snítil)	0	2	0	1	0	0	0	0	0	4	7

==== Draw 8 ====
Wednesday, November 27, 9:00

Sheet A	1	2	3	4	5	6	7	8	9	10	Final
Switzerland (Michel)	0	0	2	0	3	0	1	2	X	X	8
Russia (Drozdov) 🔨	0	1	0	1	0	1	0	0	X	X	3

Sheet B	1	2	3	4	5	6	7	8	9	10	Final
Czech Republic (Snítil) 🔨	1	0	1	0	0	0	1	0	0	1	4
Norway (Ulsrud)	0	2	0	0	2	1	0	0	1	0	6

Sheet C	1	2	3	4	5	6	7	8	9	10	Final
Sweden (Edin) 🔨	1	1	0	2	2	0	1	0	X	X	7
Latvia (Gulbis)	0	0	1	0	0	1	0	1	X	X	3

Sheet D	1	2	3	4	5	6	7	8	9	10	Final
France (Vincent) 🔨	1	0	1	0	0	0	X	X	X	X	2
Scotland (Murdoch)	0	2	0	3	3	1	X	X	X	X	9

Sheet E	1	2	3	4	5	6	7	8	9	10	Final
Finland (Rantamäki) 🔨	1	0	0	1	2	0	0	1	0	0	5
Denmark (Stjerne)	0	3	1	0	0	0	1	0	0	3	8

==== Draw 9 ====
Wednesday, November 27, 19:00

Sheet A	1	2	3	4	5	6	7	8	9	10	Final
Czech Republic (Snítil)	0	2	0	2	0	2	1	1	X	X	8
Latvia (Gulbis) 🔨	2	0	1	0	1	0	0	0	X	X	4

Sheet B	1	2	3	4	5	6	7	8	9	10	Final
Sweden (Edin)	0	0	4	0	0	1	0	0	3	X	8
Finland (Rantamäki) 🔨	2	0	0	0	1	0	1	1	0	X	5

Sheet C	1	2	3	4	5	6	7	8	9	10	Final
Scotland (Murdoch) 🔨	1	0	1	1	1	0	0	1	0	1	6
Norway (Ulsrud)	0	1	0	0	0	2	0	0	2	0	5

Sheet D	1	2	3	4	5	6	7	8	9	10	Final
Denmark (Stjerne)	0	0	1	0	1	0	0	1	1	0	4
Switzerland (Michel) 🔨	0	2	0	1	0	1	0	0	0	1	5

Sheet E	1	2	3	4	5	6	7	8	9	10	Final
Russia (Drozdov) 🔨	0	2	0	0	3	1	2	0	2	X	10
France (Vincent)	0	0	0	1	0	0	0	1	0	X	2

=== World Challenge Games ===
The winner of the best-of-three series between the eighth placed team in Group A and the winner of Group B goes to the 2014 World Men's Curling Championship.

==== Challenge 1 ====
Friday, November 29, 20:00

Sheet E	1	2	3	4	5	6	7	8	9	10	Final
Latvia (Gulbis) 🔨	0	0	0	0	1	0	1	0	X	X	2
Germany (Jahr)	0	0	0	3	0	3	0	1	X	X	7

==== Challenge 2 ====
Saturday, November 30, 10:00

Sheet D	1	2	3	4	5	6	7	8	9	10	Final
Latvia (Gulbis)	0	0	0	0	1	0	0	0	2	0	3
Germany (Jahr) 🔨	0	3	0	0	0	0	1	1	0	1	6

Germany advances to the 2014 World Men's Curling Championship.

=== Playoffs ===
Page playoff system
1	Norway	7
2	Switzerland	4
3	Denmark	6
4	Scotland	5

Semifinal
2	Switzerland	8
3	Denmark	7

Final
1	Norway	6
2	Switzerland	8

Bronze-medal game
3	Denmark	6
4	Scotland	7

==== 1 vs. 2 ====
Thursday, November 28, 20:00

Sheet E	1	2	3	4	5	6	7	8	9	10	Final
Norway (Ulsrud) 🔨	0	3	0	0	2	0	0	2	0	X	7
Switzerland (Michel)	0	0	0	1	0	0	2	0	1	X	4

Player percentages
Norway		Switzerland	
Håvard Vad Petersson	99%	Simon Gempeler	99%
Christoffer Svae	78%	Benoît Schwarz	86%
Torger Nergård	96%	Claudio Pätz	82%
Thomas Ulsrud	93%	Sven Michel	76%
Total	91%	Total	86%

==== 3 vs. 4 ====
Thursday, November 28, 20:00

Sheet B	1	2	3	4	5	6	7	8	9	10	Final
Denmark (Stjerne) 🔨	1	0	1	0	0	2	0	1	0	1	6
Scotland (Murdoch)	0	2	0	1	1	0	1	0	0	0	5

Player percentages
Denmark		Scotland	
Troels Harry	83%	Michael Goodfellow	79%
Mikkel Poulsen	80%	Scott Andrews	84%
Johnny Frederiksen	73%	Greg Drummond	81%
Rasmus Stjerne	84%	David Murdoch	85%
Total	80%	Total	82%

==== Semifinal ====
Friday, November 29, 20:00

Sheet C	1	2	3	4	5	6	7	8	9	10	Final
Switzerland (Michel) 🔨	2	0	2	0	1	0	0	2	0	1	8
Denmark (Stjerne)	0	2	0	1	0	2	0	0	2	0	7

Player percentages
Switzerland		Denmark	
Simon Gempeler	87%	Troels Harry	89%
Benoît Schwarz	80%	Mikkel Poulsen	81%
Claudio Pätz	84%	Johnny Frederiksen	78%
Sven Michel	81%	Rasmus Stjerne	86%
Total	83%	Total	83%

==== Bronze-medal game ====
Saturday, November 30, 10:00

Sheet B	1	2	3	4	5	6	7	8	9	10	Final
Denmark (Stjerne) 🔨	2	0	1	0	0	2	0	0	1	0	6
Scotland (Murdoch)	0	1	0	0	3	0	0	1	0	2	7

Player percentages
Denmark		Scotland	
Troels Harry	90%	Michael Goodfellow	90%
Mikkel Poulsen	78%	Scott Andrews	83%
Johnny Frederiksen	79%	Greg Drummond	89%
Rasmus Stjerne	80%	David Murdoch	88%
Total	82%	Total	87%

==== Final ====
Saturday, November 30, 15:00

Sheet D	1	2	3	4	5	6	7	8	9	10	Final
Norway (Ulsrud) 🔨	0	2	0	2	0	0	0	0	2	0	6
Switzerland (Michel)	0	0	3	0	1	0	0	3	0	1	8

Player percentages
Norway		Switzerland	
Håvard Vad Petersson	86%	Simon Gempeler	92%
Christoffer Svae	75%	Benoît Schwarz	83%
Torger Nergård	90%	Claudio Pätz	81%
Thomas Ulsrud	73%	Sven Michel	90%
Total	81%	Total	86%

=== Player percentages ===
Round Robin only

Leads	%
(Sweden) Viktor Kjäll	89
(Switzerland) Simon Gempeler	87
(Norway) Håvard Vad Petersson	87
(Scotland) Michael Goodfellow	86
(Russia) Petr Dron	85

Seconds	%
(Norway) Christoffer Svae	86
(Sweden) Fredrik Lindberg	84
(Denmark) Mikkel Poulsen	84
(Scotland) Scott Andrews	82
(Russia) Andrey Drozdov	81

Thirds	%
(Norway) Torger Nergård	91
(Switzerland) Claudio Pätz	83
(Sweden) Sebastian Kraupp	82
(Denmark) Johnny Frederiksen	82
(Scotland) Greg Drummond	82

Skips/Fourths	%
(Norway) Thomas Ulsrud	87
(Sweden) Niklas Edin	82
(Switzerland) Sven Michel	81
(Denmark) Rasmus Stjerne	81
(Scotland) David Murdoch	77

== Group B ==
=== Teams ===
The teams are listed as follows:

==== Yellow Group ====
England	Estonia	Germany	Italy
Skip: Alan MacDougall; Third: Andrew Reed; Second: Andrew Woolston; Lead: Thomas Jaeggi; Alternate: John Sharp	Skip: Martin Lill; Third: Harri Lill; Second: Siim Sildnik; Lead: Ingar Mäesalu; Alternate: Fred Randver	Fourth: Felix Schulze; Skip: John Jahr; Second: Christopher Bartsch; Lead: Sven Goldemann; Alternate: Peter Rickmers	Skip: Amos Mosaner; Third: Andrea Pilzer; Second: Daniele Ferrazza; Lead: Roberto Arman; Alternate: Sebastiano Arman
Romania	Slovakia	Spain	Turkey
Skip: Allen Coliban; Third: Bogdan Colceriu; Second: Bogdan Tăut; Lead: Ştefan Bodea; Alternate: Valentin Anghelinei	Fourth: Stefan Turna Skip: Pavel Kocian; Second: Ronald Krcmar; Lead: Radomir Vozar; Alternate: Ivan Stano	Skip: Mikel Unanue; Third: Sergio Vez; Second: Iñaki Lasuen; Lead: Victor Mirete; Alternate: Avelino Garcia	Skip: Alican Karataş; Third: Ilhan Osmanagaoglu; Second: Bilal Ömer Çakır; Lead: Murat Sağır; Alternate: Muhammet Oǧuz Zengin

==== Blue Group ====
Austria	Belgium	Croatia	Hungary
Skip: Markus Forejtek; Third: Martin Egretzberger; Second: Marcus Schmitt; Lead: Felix Purzner; Alternate: Sebastian Wunderer	Skip: Timothy Verrycken; Third: Walter Verbueken; Second: Nils Beosier; Lead: Dirk Heylen; Alternate: Gregory Janbroers	Skip: Alen Čadež; Third: Dražen Ćutić; Second: Ognjen Golubić; Lead: Robert Mikulandrić; Alternate: Ivica Ivaci	Skip: Gábor Ézsöl; Third: Lajos Belleli; Second: Krisztián Hall; Lead: Balázs Varga; Alternate: Tamás Vaspöri
Lithuania	Netherlands	Poland	Wales
Skip: Tadas Vyskupaitis; Third: Vytis Kulakauskas; Second: Laurynas Telksnys; Lead: Vidas Sadauskas; Alternate: Vygantas Zalieckas	Skip: Jaap van Dorp; Third: Carlo Glasbergen; Second: Wouter Gösgens; Lead: Joey Bruinsma; Alternate: Floyd Koelewijn	Fourth: Jakub Głowania; Skip: Tomasz Zioło; Second: Konrad Stych; Lead: Michał Kozioł; Alternate: Adam Sterczewski	Skip: Adrian Meikle; Third: James Pougher; Second: Andrew Tanner; Lead: Garry Coombs; Alternate: Rhys Phillips

=== Round-robin standings ===
Final round-robin standings

Key
Countries to Playoffs
Countries to Tiebreakers
Countries relegated to 2014 Group C

Yellow Group	Skip	W	L
Germany	John Jahr	7	0
Estonia	Martin Lill	5	2
England	Alan MacDougall	5	2
Italy	Amos Mosaner	5	2
Turkey	Alican Karataş	3	4
Spain	Mikel Unanue	2	5
Romania	Allen Coliban	1	6
Slovakia	Pavel Kocian	0	7

Blue Group	Skip	W	L
Hungary	Gábor Ézsöl	7	0
Netherlands	Jaap van Dorp	5	2
Poland	Tomasz Zioło	5	2
Wales	Adrian Meikle	4	3
Austria	Markus Forejtek	3	4
Croatia	Alen Čadež	2	5
Lithuania	Tadas Vyskupaitis	1	6
Belgium	Timothy Verreycken	1	6

* Belgium relegated to Group C after losing tiebreaker to Lithuania.

=== Round-robin results ===
==== Yellow Group ====
===== Draw 1 =====
Friday, November 22, 19:30

Sheet F	1	2	3	4	5	6	7	8	9	10	Final
Germany (Jahr) 🔨	2	0	3	0	2	1	3	X	X	X	11
Slovakia (Kocian)	0	1	0	1	0	0	0	X	X	X	2

Sheet G	1	2	3	4	5	6	7	8	9	10	Final
England (MacDougall) 🔨	0	0	0	0	2	1	0	7	X	X	10
Turkey (Karataş)	0	0	0	0	0	0	2	0	X	X	2

Sheet H	1	2	3	4	5	6	7	8	9	10	Final
Italy (Mosaner) 🔨	0	1	0	5	1	0	2	3	X	X	12
Spain (Unanue)	1	0	2	0	0	1	0	0	X	X	4

Sheet J	1	2	3	4	5	6	7	8	9	10	Final
Estonia (Lill) 🔨	1	1	0	4	1	0	0	3	0	X	10
Romania (Coliban)	0	0	1	0	0	2	1	0	0	X	4

===== Draw 2 =====
Saturday, November 23, 14:30

Sheet K	1	2	3	4	5	6	7	8	9	10	Final
Turkey (Karataş)	0	0	0	0	1	0	1	0	0	X	2
Germany (Jahr) 🔨	0	0	1	2	0	2	0	1	1	X	7

Sheet L	1	2	3	4	5	6	7	8	9	10	Final
Estonia (Lill) 🔨	1	0	2	0	0	1	0	2	0	1	7
Spain (Unanue)	0	1	0	2	2	0	0	0	1	0	6

===== Draw 3 =====
Sunday, November 24, 8:00

Sheet F	1	2	3	4	5	6	7	8	9	10	Final
Turkey (Karataş) 🔨	0	0	0	1	0	1	0	1	0	0	3
Estonia (Lill)	1	1	0	0	2	0	0	0	0	1	5

Sheet G	1	2	3	4	5	6	7	8	9	10	Final
Spain (Unanue) 🔨	0	0	0	0	2	0	0	X	X	X	2
Germany (Jahr)	1	1	1	2	0	2	3	X	X	X	10

Sheet H	1	2	3	4	5	6	7	8	9	10	Final
Romania (Coliban)	1	2	1	0	2	0	1	0	0	0	7
Slovakia (Kocian) 🔨	0	0	0	2	0	1	0	1	1	1	6

Sheet J	1	2	3	4	5	6	7	8	9	10	Final
England (MacDougall)	0	0	0	2	0	1	0	2	0	1	6
Italy (Mosaner) 🔨	0	0	1	0	0	0	1	0	2	0	4

===== Draw 4 =====
Sunday, November 24, 16:00

Sheet H	1	2	3	4	5	6	7	8	9	10	Final
Estonia (Lill) 🔨	0	2	1	0	2	1	0	0	2	X	8
England (MacDougall)	0	0	0	0	0	0	1	1	0	X	2

Sheet L	1	2	3	4	5	6	7	8	9	10	Final
Italy (Mosaner) 🔨	2	0	1	0	0	0	2	0	2	X	7
Romania (Coliban)	0	1	0	0	1	1	0	1	0	X	4

Sunday, November 24, 20:00

Sheet J	1	2	3	4	5	6	7	8	9	10	Final
Slovakia (Kocian)	0	1	2	0	0	0	0	0	1	X	4
Spain (Unanue) 🔨	2	0	0	1	1	0	0	3	0	X	7

===== Draw 5 =====
Monday, November 25, 8:00

Sheet F	1	2	3	4	5	6	7	8	9	10	Final
England (MacDougall) 🔨	1	0	0	2	4	0	3	X	X	X	10
Spain (Unanue)	0	1	0	0	0	1	0	X	X	X	2

Sheet G	1	2	3	4	5	6	7	8	9	10	Final
Estonia (Lill) 🔨	2	0	0	1	0	5	0	1	X	X	9
Slovakia (Kocian)	0	1	1	0	1	0	1	0	X	X	4

Sheet H	1	2	3	4	5	6	7	8	9	10	Final
Germany (Jahr)	0	0	1	0	0	0	2	1	1	X	5
Italy (Mosaner) 🔨	1	1	0	1	0	0	0	0	0	X	3

Sheet J	1	2	3	4	5	6	7	8	9	10	Final
Romania (Coliban) 🔨	0	2	0	1	0	1	0	2	0	0	6
Turkey (Karataş)	2	0	1	0	2	0	1	0	1	1	8

===== Draw 6 =====
Monday, November 25, 16:00

Sheet K	1	2	3	4	5	6	7	8	9	10	Final
Spain (Unanue) 🔨	1	0	0	3	0	1	0	2	1	X	8
Romania (Coliban)	0	1	0	0	2	0	3	0	0	X	6

Sheet L	1	2	3	4	5	6	7	8	9	10	Final
Turkey (Karataş) 🔨	1	0	1	1	1	0	4	0	0	X	8
Slovakia (Kocian)	0	1	0	0	0	1	0	1	1	X	4

===== Draw 7 =====
Tuesday, November 26, 8:00

Sheet K	1	2	3	4	5	6	7	8	9	10	11	Final
Italy (Mosaner) 🔨	0	2	0	1	0	1	0	2	0	0	1	7
Estonia (Lill)	0	0	2	0	2	0	1	0	0	1	0	6

Sheet L	1	2	3	4	5	6	7	8	9	10	Final
England (MacDougall) 🔨	0	1	1	0	0	1	0	0	1	0	4
Germany (Jahr)	1	0	0	1	1	0	0	1	0	1	5

===== Draw 8 =====
Tuesday, November 26, 16:00

Sheet F	1	2	3	4	5	6	7	8	9	10	Final
Slovakia (Kocian) 🔨	1	0	2	0	1	0	2	0	1	0	7
Italy (Mosaner)	0	2	0	2	0	3	0	1	0	1	9

Sheet G	1	2	3	4	5	6	7	8	9	10	Final
Romania (Coliban) 🔨	1	0	0	0	0	1	0	0	X	X	2
England (MacDougall)	0	4	1	1	0	0	4	1	X	X	11

Sheet H	1	2	3	4	5	6	7	8	9	10	Final
Spain (Unanue) 🔨	0	2	0	0	0	0	1	0	0	X	3
Turkey (Karataş)	1	0	1	0	1	3	0	2	1	X	9

Sheet J	1	2	3	4	5	6	7	8	9	10	Final
Germany (Jahr) 🔨	2	0	0	3	0	0	0	2	0	1	8
Estonia (Lill)	0	2	1	0	0	0	2	0	1	0	6

===== Draw 9 =====
Wednesday, November 27, 8:00

Sheet F	1	2	3	4	5	6	7	8	9	10	Final
Romania (Coliban)	0	2	0	1	1	0	0	1	0	X	5
Germany (Jahr)	2	0	2	0	0	2	1	0	3	X	10

Sheet K	1	2	3	4	5	6	7	8	9	10	Final
Slovakia (Kocian) 🔨	1	0	1	0	0	0	0	0	0	X	2
England (MacDougall)	0	0	0	2	0	1	0	2	2	X	7

Wednesday, November 27, 12:00

Sheet G	1	2	3	4	5	6	7	8	9	10	Final
Turkey (Karataş)	1	0	1	0	2	0	1	1	1	0	7
Italy (Mosaner) 🔨	0	1	0	1	0	4	0	0	0	2	8

=== Blue Group ===
==== Draw 1 ====
Saturday, November 22, 19:30

Sheet K	1	2	3	4	5	6	7	8	9	10	Final
Belgium (Verrycken)	0	1	0	4	0	0	1	0	2	0	8
Poland (Zioło) 🔨	1	0	2	0	1	2	0	2	0	2	10

Sheet L	1	2	3	4	5	6	7	8	9	10	Final
Austria (Forejtek)	0	0	0	0	0	0	X	X	X	X	0
Hungary (Ézsöl) 🔨	4	3	2	0	2	2	X	X	X	X	13

==== Draw 2 ====
Saturday, November 23, 14:30

Sheet F	1	2	3	4	5	6	7	8	9	10	Final
Hungary (Ézsöl) 🔨	0	2	0	2	0	0	0	2	0	2	8
Lithuania (Vyskupaitis)	1	0	2	0	1	0	2	0	0	0	6

Sheet G	1	2	3	4	5	6	7	8	9	10	Final
Netherlands (van Dorp)	0	0	0	3	0	1	0	1	0	1	6
Austria (Forejtek) 🔨	1	0	0	0	2	0	0	0	1	0	4

Sheet H	1	2	3	4	5	6	7	8	9	10	Final
Croatia (Čadež)	0	1	0	1	0	0	1	0	0	X	3
Poland (Zioło) 🔨	2	0	1	0	1	0	0	1	1	X	6

Sheet J	1	2	3	4	5	6	7	8	9	10	Final
Wales (Meikle)	1	0	1	0	0	1	1	2	1	X	7
Belgium (Verrycken) 🔨	0	0	0	1	1	0	0	0	0	X	2

==== Draw 3 ====
Sunday, November 24, 8:00

Sheet K	1	2	3	4	5	6	7	8	9	10	Final
Lithuania (Vyskupaitis) 🔨	2	0	0	1	0	0	1	0	1	0	5
Netherlands (van Dorp)	0	3	1	0	1	1	0	2	0	1	9

Sheet L	1	2	3	4	5	6	7	8	9	10	Final
Wales (Meikle)	0	0	1	2	0	0	1	0	0	X	4
Croatia (Čadež) 🔨	4	1	0	0	0	1	0	2	1	X	9

==== Draw 4 ====
Sunday, November 24, 16:00

Sheet F	1	2	3	4	5	6	7	8	9	10	Final
Belgium (Verrycken)	1	2	1	0	0	0	1	0	X	X	5
Austria (Forejtek) 🔨	0	0	0	1	2	3	0	4	X	X	10

Sheet G	1	2	3	4	5	6	7	8	9	10	Final
Hungary (Ézsöl)	0	1	2	2	0	1	0	3	0	1	10
Poland (Zioło) 🔨	3	0	0	0	2	0	1	0	2	0	8

Sheet J	1	2	3	4	5	6	7	8	9	10	Final
Lithuania (Vyskupaitis) 🔨	2	1	0	0	1	0	0	0	1	0	5
Croatia (Čadež)	0	0	1	1	0	1	1	0	0	3	7

==== Draw 5 ====
Monday, November 25, 8:00

Sheet K	1	2	3	4	5	6	7	8	9	10	Final
Wales (Meikle) 🔨	0	0	0	1	0	0	2	0	2	X	5
Hungary (Ézsöl)	0	2	2	0	1	1	0	2	0	X	8

Sheet L	1	2	3	4	5	6	7	8	9	10	Final
Belgium (Verrycken)	0	0	1	0	1	0	1	0	X	X	3
Netherlands (van Dorp) 🔨	1	0	0	2	0	2	0	4	X	X	9

==== Draw 6 ====
Monday, November 25, 16:00

Sheet F	1	2	3	4	5	6	7	8	9	10	Final
Poland (Zioło)	1	0	0	1	0	0	0	X	X	X	2
Wales (Meikle) 🔨	0	2	1	0	2	2	2	X	X	X	9

Sheet G	1	2	3	4	5	6	7	8	9	10	11	Final
Croatia (Čadež)	0	1	0	1	0	0	1	2	0	1	0	6
Belgium (Verrycken) 🔨	1	0	0	0	3	1	0	0	1	0	1	7

Sheet H	1	2	3	4	5	6	7	8	9	10	11	Final
Austria (Forejtek)	0	0	2	0	1	0	0	0	1	2	1	7
Lithuania (Vyskupaitis) 🔨	1	1	0	2	0	1	0	1	0	0	0	6

Sheet J	1	2	3	4	5	6	7	8	9	10	Final
Hungary (Ézsöl) 🔨	2	1	0	2	0	1	0	1	0	2	9
Netherlands (van Dorp)	0	0	1	0	2	0	4	0	1	0	8

==== Draw 7 ====
Tuesday, November 26, 8:00

Sheet F	1	2	3	4	5	6	7	8	9	10	Final
Netherlands (van Dorp) 🔨	0	0	0	3	1	0	1	0	1	X	6
Croatia (Čadež)	0	0	0	0	0	1	0	1	0	X	2

Sheet G	1	2	3	4	5	6	7	8	9	10	Final
Lithuania (Vyskupaitis) 🔨	0	1	0	0	0	1	X	X	X	X	2
Wales (Meikle)	3	0	5	4	1	0	X	X	X	X	13

Sheet H	1	2	3	4	5	6	7	8	9	10	Final
Hungary (Ézsöl)	1	1	0	0	6	0	1	0	1	X	10
Belgium (Verrycken) 🔨	0	0	0	1	0	1	0	4	0	X	6

Sheet J	1	2	3	4	5	6	7	8	9	10	Final
Poland (Zioło) 🔨	0	0	1	0	0	2	0	0	2	1	6
Austria (Forejtek)	1	1	0	1	1	0	0	1	0	0	5

==== Draw 8 ====
Tuesday, November 26, 16:00

Sheet H	1	2	3	4	5	6	7	8	9	10	Final
Netherlands (van Dorp)	1	1	0	2	2	0	1	1	0	X	8
Wales (Meikle) 🔨	0	0	1	0	0	2	0	0	1	X	4

Sheet K	1	2	3	4	5	6	7	8	9	10	Final
Austria (Forejtek) 🔨	0	0	1	0	0	1	0	1	0	1	4
Croatia (Čadež)	0	0	0	0	1	0	1	0	1	0	3

Sheet L	1	2	3	4	5	6	7	8	9	10	Final
Poland (Zioło)	2	0	1	0	2	1	0	0	1	X	7
Lithuania (Vyskupaitis) 🔨	0	1	0	1	0	0	1	1	0	X	4

==== Draw 9 ====
Wednesday, November 27, 8:00

Sheet G	1	2	3	4	5	6	7	8	9	10	Final
Poland (Zioło) 🔨	1	1	0	1	0	0	1	0	3	X	7
Netherlands (van Dorp)	0	0	1	0	1	0	0	3	0	X	5

Sheet H	1	2	3	4	5	6	7	8	9	10	Final
Wales (Meikle) 🔨	1	0	1	0	1	0	1	2	0	1	7
Austria (Forejtek)	0	0	0	2	0	1	0	0	3	0	6

Sheet J	1	2	3	4	5	6	7	8	9	10	Final
Croatia (Čadež)	1	0	0	1	0	2	0	1	0	X	5
Hungary (Ézsöl) 🔨	0	1	2	0	4	0	1	0	1	X	9

Sheet L	1	2	3	4	5	6	7	8	9	10	Final
Lithuania (Vyskupaitis) 🔨	0	1	1	1	0	0	2	2	1	X	8
Belgium (Verrycken)	1	0	0	0	1	0	0	0	0	X	2

=== Tiebreakers ===
Wednesday, November 27, 16:00

Sheet H	1	2	3	4	5	6	7	8	9	10	11	Final
Estonia (Lill)	0	3	0	0	0	0	0	1	0	0	1	5
England (MacDougall) 🔨	1	0	1	0	0	0	0	0	1	1	0	4

Sheet J	1	2	3	4	5	6	7	8	9	10	Final
Netherlands (van Dorp) 🔨	3	0	0	3	0	3	0	0	2	X	11
Poland (Zioło)	0	1	1	0	3	0	1	1	0	X	7

Thursday, November 28, 8:00

Sheet K	1	2	3	4	5	6	7	8	9	10	11	Final
Estonia (Lill)	1	1	0	0	1	0	0	1	0	2	0	6
Italy (Mosaner) 🔨	0	0	0	2	0	1	1	0	2	0	1	7

=== Placement game ===
Wednesday, November 27, 16:00

Sheet G	1	2	3	4	5	6	7	8	9	10	Final
Lithuania (Vyskupaitis)	0	1	2	1	0	2	0	1	0	2	9
Belgium (Verreycken) 🔨	1	0	0	0	1	0	1	0	3	0	6

=== Playoffs ===
Page playoff system
Y1	Germany	7
B1	Hungary	1
Y2	Italy	6
B2	Netherlands	4

Semifinal
B1	Hungary	6
Y2	Italy	7

Final
Y1	Germany	9
Y2	Italy	3

Bronze-medal game
B1	Hungary	7
B2	Netherlands	5

==== Y1 vs. B1 ====
Thursday, November 28, 14:00

Sheet G	1	2	3	4	5	6	7	8	9	10	Final
Germany (Jahr) 🔨	0	0	1	2	0	1	1	2	X	X	7
Hungary (Ézsöl)	0	0	0	0	1	0	0	0	X	X	1

==== Y2 vs. B2 ====
Thursday, November 28, 14:00

Sheet L	1	2	3	4	5	6	7	8	9	10	Final
Italy (Mosaner) 🔨	1	0	1	1	1	0	1	0	0	1	6
Netherlands (van Dorp)	0	2	0	0	0	1	0	1	0	0	4

==== Semifinal ====
Thursday, November 28, 20:00

Sheet J	1	2	3	4	5	6	7	8	9	10	Final
Hungary (Ézsöl) 🔨	0	1	0	2	0	3	0	0	0	0	6
Italy (Mosaner)	1	0	1	0	1	0	1	1	1	1	7

==== Bronze-medal game ====
Friday, November 29, 12:00

Sheet H	1	2	3	4	5	6	7	8	9	10	Final
Hungary (Ézsöl)	0	3	0	0	1	1	0	1	0	1	7
Netherlands (van Dorp) 🔨	1	0	1	1	0	0	1	0	1	0	5

==== Final ====
Friday, November 29, 12:00

Sheet K	1	2	3	4	5	6	7	8	9	10	Final
Germany (Jahr) 🔨	0	1	1	0	0	2	0	5	X	X	9
Italy (Mosaner)	0	0	0	0	2	0	1	0	X	X	3

== Group C ==
The eight men's teams will play a single round robin, and at its conclusion, the top four teams will advance to the playoffs, which will be held in a format similar to that of the World Wheelchair Curling Championship qualification events. In the playoffs, the first and second seeds will play a semifinal game to determine the first team to advance to the Group B competitions. The loser of this game, along with the winner of the semifinal game played by the third and fourth seeds will advance to the second place game, which determines the second team to advance to the Group B competitions.

=== Teams ===
The teams are listed as follows:

Belarus	Iceland	Ireland	Luxembourg
Skip: Pavel Petrov; Third: Dimitri Kirillov; Second: Andrew Avlasenko; Lead: Yury Pavlyuchik; Alternate: Igor Platonov	Skip: Ólafur Hreinsson; Third: Kristján Bjarnason; Second: Árni Árnason; Lead: Hallgrímur Valsson	Skip: Alan Mitchell; Third: James Russell; Second: John Furey; Lead: Arran Cameron; Alternate: Craig Whyte	Skip: Jörg Moeser; Third: Yves Sieradzki; Second: Claude Schweitzer; Lead: Alex Benoy; Alternate: Marc Hansen
Romania	Serbia	Slovenia	Wales
Skip: Allen Coliban; Third: Bogdan Colceriu; Second: Bogdan Taut; Lead: Stefan Bodea	Skip: Đorđe Nešković; Third: Bojan Mijatović; Second: Goran Ungurović; Lead: Filip Stojanović	Skip: Lan Žagar; Third: Tomaž Toplak; Second: Marko Harb; Lead: Žiga Babič; Alternate: Marko Šinkovec	Skip: Adrian Meikle; Third: James Pougher; Second: Andrew Tanner; Lead: Garry Coombs; Alternate: Rhys Phillips

=== Round-robin standings ===
Final round-robin standings

Key
Teams to Playoffs

Country	Skip	W	L
Wales	Adrian Meikle	6	1
Romania	Allen Coliban	5	2
Slovenia	Lan Žagar	5	2
Serbia	Đorđe Nešković	4	3
Belarus	Pavel Petrov	3	4
Ireland	Alan Mitchell	3	4
Luxembourg	Jörg Moeser	2	5
Iceland	Ólafur Hreinsson	0	7

=== Round-robin results ===
All draw times are listed in Central European Time (UTC+1).

==== Draw 1 ====
Tuesday, October 8, 8:00

Sheet A	1	2	3	4	5	6	7	8	9	10	Final
Iceland (Hreinsson) 🔨	0	0	0	0	0	0	X	X	X	X	0
Belarus (Petrov)	1	1	3	1	1	2	X	X	X	X	9

Sheet B	1	2	3	4	5	6	7	8	9	10	Final
Serbia (Nešković) 🔨	1	0	0	0	0	1	0	X	X	X	2
Wales (Meikle)	0	3	2	2	1	0	3	X	X	X	11

Sheet C	1	2	3	4	5	6	7	8	9	10	11	Final
Romania (Coliban) 🔨	0	0	0	1	0	0	2	0	2	2	1	8
Slovenia (Žagar)	2	0	0	0	2	2	0	1	0	0	0	7

Sheet D	1	2	3	4	5	6	7	8	9	10	Final
Luxembourg (Moeser) 🔨	0	0	4	0	0	0	0	X	X	X	4
Ireland (Mitchell)	3	0	0	4	1	2	1	X	X	X	11

==== Draw 2 ====
Tuesday, October 8, 16:00

Sheet A	1	2	3	4	5	6	7	8	9	10	Final
Serbia (Nešković) 🔨	0	0	0	2	0	4	4	1	X	X	11
Romania (Coliban)	1	1	1	0	1	0	0	0	X	X	4

Sheet B	1	2	3	4	5	6	7	8	9	10	Final
Luxembourg (Moeser) 🔨	3	4	0	1	1	0	0	3	X	X	12
Iceland (Hreinsson)	0	0	1	0	0	1	2	0	X	X	4

Sheet C	1	2	3	4	5	6	7	8	9	10	Final
Ireland (Mitchell) 🔨	0	0	0	2	0	2	0	0	2	0	6
Belarus (Petrov)	1	1	1	0	3	0	0	0	0	1	7

Sheet D	1	2	3	4	5	6	7	8	9	10	Final
Wales (Meikle) 🔨	0	2	0	2	0	3	0	1	2	0	10
Slovenia (Žagar)	1	0	4	0	4	0	2	0	0	1	12

==== Draw 3 ====
Wednesday, October 9, 9:00

Sheet A	1	2	3	4	5	6	7	8	9	10	Final
Wales (Meikle)	0	1	3	2	0	1	1	0	0	X	8
Iceland (Hreinsson) 🔨	1	0	0	0	1	0	0	2	2	X	6

Sheet B	1	2	3	4	5	6	7	8	9	10	11	Final
Romania (Coliban)	0	0	1	0	0	1	1	1	0	0	2	6
Ireland (Mitchell) 🔨	0	2	0	0	0	0	0	0	1	1	0	4

Sheet C	1	2	3	4	5	6	7	8	9	10	Final
Slovenia (Žagar) 🔨	2	2	0	2	0	5	X	X	X	X	11
Luxembourg (Moeser)	0	0	2	0	1	0	X	X	X	X	3

Sheet D	1	2	3	4	5	6	7	8	9	10	Final
Serbia (Nešković) 🔨	1	0	2	0	1	0	1	1	2	X	8
Belarus (Petrov)	0	1	0	1	0	2	0	0	0	X	4

==== Draw 4 ====
Wednesday, October 9, 19:00

Sheet A	1	2	3	4	5	6	7	8	9	10	Final
Slovenia (Žagar)	0	1	0	3	4	0	0	0	1	0	9
Ireland (Mitchell) 🔨	1	0	4	0	0	1	2	1	0	2	11

Sheet B	1	2	3	4	5	6	7	8	9	10	Final
Wales (Meikle) 🔨	1	1	1	2	0	0	5	X	X	X	10
Belarus (Petrov)	0	0	0	0	1	1	0	X	X	X	2

Sheet C	1	2	3	4	5	6	7	8	9	10	11	Final
Serbia (Nešković) 🔨	0	0	2	0	1	1	0	3	0	0	1	8
Iceland (Hreinsson)	1	2	0	1	0	0	1	0	1	1	0	7

Sheet D	1	2	3	4	5	6	7	8	9	10	Final
Romania (Coliban) 🔨	1	1	1	0	3	1	0	5	X	X	12
Luxembourg (Moeser)	0	0	0	2	0	0	2	0	X	X	4

==== Draw 5 ====
Thursday, October 10, 12:00

Sheet A	1	2	3	4	5	6	7	8	9	10	Final
Luxembourg (Moeser)	3	0	2	1	1	2	3	X	X	X	12
Serbia (Nešković) 🔨	0	0	0	0	0	0	0	X	X	X	0

Sheet B	1	2	3	4	5	6	7	8	9	10	Final
Iceland (Hreinsson) 🔨	0	5	1	0	0	0	2	0	0	X	8
Slovenia (Žagar)	1	0	0	1	3	4	0	2	1	X	12

Sheet C	1	2	3	4	5	6	7	8	9	10	Final
Belarus (Petrov) 🔨	4	0	0	0	0	0	0	0	1	X	5
Romania (Coliban)	0	1	2	1	2	1	1	2	0	X	10

Sheet D	1	2	3	4	5	6	7	8	9	10	Final
Ireland (Mitchell)	0	0	0	1	0	2	3	1	0	0	7
Wales (Meikle) 🔨	1	1	3	0	2	0	0	0	0	2	9

==== Draw 6 ====
Thursday, October 10, 20:00

Sheet A	1	2	3	4	5	6	7	8	9	10	Final
Belarus (Petrov) 🔨	0	0	1	0	0	0	2	0	0	X	3
Slovenia (Žagar)	2	1	0	2	1	1	0	1	4	X	12

Sheet B	1	2	3	4	5	6	7	8	9	10	Final
Ireland (Mitchell) 🔨	0	2	0	0	2	0	0	1	0	3	8
Serbia (Nešković)	1	0	3	0	0	2	1	0	2	0	9

Sheet C	1	2	3	4	5	6	7	8	9	10	Final
Luxembourg (Moeser) 🔨	0	0	0	0	1	0	0	0	X	X	1
Wales (Meikle)	1	1	1	1	0	2	1	0	X	X	7

Sheet D	1	2	3	4	5	6	7	8	9	10	Final
Iceland (Hreinsson)	0	0	0	0	1	0	1	0	X	X	2
Romania (Coliban) 🔨	3	1	1	1	0	1	0	4	X	X	11

==== Draw 7 ====
Friday, October 11, 13:00

Sheet A	1	2	3	4	5	6	7	8	9	10	Final
Romania (Coliban)	1	0	0	1	0	1	1	1	0	0	5
Wales (Meikle) 🔨	0	1	0	0	3	0	0	0	0	2	6

Sheet B	1	2	3	4	5	6	7	8	9	10	Final
Belarus (Petrov) 🔨	3	0	0	2	0	2	0	2	1	X	10
Luxembourg (Moeser)	0	2	1	0	0	0	1	0	0	X	4

Sheet C	1	2	3	4	5	6	7	8	9	10	Final
Iceland (Hreinsson) 🔨	1	1	0	0	1	0	1	0	0	X	4
Ireland (Mitchell)	0	0	2	1	0	2	0	3	1	X	9

Sheet D	1	2	3	4	5	6	7	8	9	10	Final
Slovenia (Žagar) 🔨	0	2	2	2	0	1	2	0	1	X	10
Serbia (Nešković)	0	0	0	0	3	0	0	1	0	X	4

=== Playoffs ===
Second Place Game
2	Romania	9
4	Serbia	5

Semifinals
1	Wales	8
2	Romania	5
3	Slovenia	4
4	Serbia	9

==== Semifinals ====
Saturday, October 12, 9:00

Sheet A	1	2	3	4	5	6	7	8	9	10	Final
Wales (Meikle) 🔨	1	0	0	3	1	1	1	0	1	X	8
Romania (Coliban)	0	2	1	0	0	0	0	2	0	X	5

Sheet B	1	2	3	4	5	6	7	8	9	10	Final
Slovenia (Žagar) 🔨	0	0	0	0	0	2	0	2	0	X	4
Serbia (Nešković)	1	1	1	1	2	0	2	0	1	X	9

==== Second Place Game ====
Saturday, October 12, 14:00

Sheet D	1	2	3	4	5	6	7	8	9	10	Final
Romania (Coliban) 🔨	2	0	0	2	0	1	1	3	0	X	9
Serbia (Nešković)	0	1	1	0	1	0	0	0	2	X	5
