= 2017 World Men's Curling Championship =

Men's Curling Championship

- Host city: Edmonton, Alberta
- Arena: Northlands Coliseum
- Dates: April 1–9, 2017
- Attendance: 85,214
- Winner: Canada
- Curling club: Bally Haly G&CC & St. John's CC, St. John's
- Skip: Brad Gushue
- Third: Mark Nichols
- Second: Brett Gallant
- Lead: Geoff Walker
- Alternate: Thomas Sallows
- Coach: Jules Owchar
- Finalist: Sweden (Niklas Edin)

The 2017 World Men's Curling Championship (branded as Ford World Men's Curling Championship 2017 for sponsorship reasons) was a curling event that was held from April 1 to 9 at Northlands Coliseum in Edmonton, Alberta.

Canada won the title for the 36th time overall and the second consecutive year. Like Rachel Homan's team at the women's tournament, Brad Gushue and his teammates finished with a perfect 13–0 record, which included defeating eventual runner-up Niklas Edin of Sweden three times. Switzerland won the bronze medal.

With the win, Gushue became the first skip in the history of the sport to win the world junior title, the Olympic gold medal, and the world men's title, and Canada became the first country ever to be in simultaneous possession of Olympic and World championships in both men's and women's curling.

== Qualification ==
The following nations qualified to participate in the 2017 World Men's Curling Championship:

- Canada (host country)
- One team from the Americas zone
  - United States (winner of the 2017 Americas Challenge)
- Eight teams from the 2016 European Curling Championships
  - Sweden
  - Norway
  - Switzerland
  - Russia
  - Germany
  - Scotland
  - Italy
  - Netherlands (winner of the World Challenge Games)
- Two teams from the 2016 Pacific-Asia Curling Championships
  - Japan
  - China

== Teams ==
Canada	China	Germany
Bally Haly G&CC & St. John's CC, St. John's Skip: Brad Gushue; Third: Mark Nichols; Second: Brett Gallant; Lead: Geoff Walker; Alternate: Thomas Sallows	Harbin CC, Harbin Skip: Liu Rui; Third: Xu Xiaoming; Second: Ba Dexin; Lead: Zang Jialiang; Alternate: Zou Qiang	Baden Hills G&CC, Rheinmünster Skip: Alexander Baumann; Third: Manuel Walter; Second: Daniel Herberg; Lead: Ryan Sherrard; Alternate: Sebastian Schweizer
Italy	Japan	Netherlands
A.S.D. Trentino Curling, Cembra Fourth: Amos Mosaner; Skip: Joël Retornaz; Second: Andrea Pilzer; Lead: Daniele Ferrazza; Alternate: Simone Gonin	Karuizawa CC, Karuizawa Skip: Yusuke Morozumi; Third: Tetsuro Shimizu; Second: Tsuyoshi Yamaguchi; Lead: Kosuke Morozumi; Alternate: Kosuke Hirata	CC PWA Zoetermeer, Zoetermeer Skip: Jaap van Dorp; Third: Wouter Gösgens; Second: Laurens Hoekman; Lead: Carlo Glasbergen; Alternate: Alexander Magan
Norway	Russia	Scotland
Oppdal CK, Oppdal Skip: Steffen Walstad; Third: Markus Høiberg; Second: Magnus Nedregotten; Lead: Alexander Lindström; Alternate: Sander Rølvåg	Moskvitch CC, Moscow Skip: Alexey Timofeev^{1} Third: Alexey Stukalskiy^{1} Second: Timur Gadzhikanov; Lead: Artur Razhabov; Alternate: Evgeny Klimov	Curl Aberdeen, Aberdeen Skip: David Murdoch; Third: Greg Drummond; Second: Scott Andrews; Lead: Michael Goodfellow; Alternate: Ross Paterson
Sweden	Switzerland	United States
Karlstads CK, Karlstad Skip: Niklas Edin; Third: Oskar Eriksson; Second: Rasmus Wranå; Lead: Christoffer Sundgren; Alternate: Henrik Leek	CC Genève, Geneva Fourth: Benoît Schwarz; Third: Claudio Pätz; Skip: Peter de Cruz; Lead: Valentin Tanner; Alternate: Romano Meier	Duluth CC, Duluth Skip: John Shuster; Third: Tyler George; Second: Matt Hamilton; Lead: John Landsteiner; Alternate: Joe Polo

Notes

1. Stuklaskiy threw skip stones during Draws 1, 3 and 17 while Timofeev threw third stones.

=== WCT ranking ===
Year to date World Curling Tour order of merit ranking for each team prior to the event.

Nation (Skip)	Rank	Points
Sweden (Edin)	1	500.42
Canada (Gushue)	2	482.53
Switzerland (de Cruz)	12	234.12
Scotland (Murdoch)	14	203.56
Norway (Walstad)	15	198.38
China (Liu)	24	153.89
United States (Shuster)	25	150.18
Japan (Morozumi)	36	108.28
Netherlands (van Dorp)	54	79.45
Germany (Baumann)	63	61.56
Russia (Timofeev)	66	57.94
Italy (Retornaz)	178	14.81

== Round-robin standings ==
Final round-robin standings

Key
Teams to Playoffs

Locale	Skip	W	L	PF	PA	Ends Won	Ends Lost	Blank Ends	Stolen Ends	Shot Pct.	DSC
Canada	Brad Gushue	11	0	94	35	45	29	9	11	92%	14.26
Sweden	Niklas Edin	9	2	85	52	46	39	10	7	86%	16.12
Switzerland	Peter de Cruz	8	3	70	58	44	40	15	10	84%	27.09
United States	John Shuster	8	3	72	56	45	38	9	12	83%	30.65
China	Liu Rui	6	5	72	70	41	43	9	5	83%	26.37
Scotland	David Murdoch	6	5	69	60	47	41	14	11	86%	29.73
Japan	Yusuke Morozumi	5	6	68	64	42	44	5	9	81%	36.85
Norway	Steffen Walstad	5	6	64	71	46	41	15	13	83%	44.51
Italy	Joel Retornaz	4	7	63	72	38	45	13	7	79%	67.42
Germany	Alexander Baumann	3	8	51	77	37	47	17	6	80%	47.66
Netherlands	Jaap van Dorp	1	10	50	89	40	45	12	8	78%	46.20
Russia	Alexey Timofeev	0	11	47	96	34	51	8	5	76%	51.71

== Round-robin results ==
All times listed in Mountain Daylight Time (UTC−6).

=== Draw 1 ===
Saturday, April 1, 14:00

Sheet A	1	2	3	4	5	6	7	8	9	10	Final
Switzerland (de Cruz)	2	0	0	1	0	1	0	0	1	0	5
Canada (Gushue)	0	2	0	0	1	0	3	0	0	1	7

Sheet B	1	2	3	4	5	6	7	8	9	10	Final
Russia (Stukalskiy)	0	0	1	0	0	1	X	X	X	X	2
United States (Shuster)	1	2	0	3	3	0	X	X	X	X	9

Sheet C	1	2	3	4	5	6	7	8	9	10	Final
Japan (Morozumi)	1	0	2	2	0	1	0	1	2	X	9
Italy (Retornaz)	0	2	0	0	2	0	1	0	0	X	5

Sheet D	1	2	3	4	5	6	7	8	9	10	11	Final
Netherlands (van Dorp)	1	0	1	0	0	1	0	1	0	1	0	5
Germany (Baumann)	0	1	0	0	0	0	2	0	2	0	1	6

=== Draw 2 ===
Saturday, April 1, 19:00

Sheet A	1	2	3	4	5	6	7	8	9	10	Final
Scotland (Murdoch)	0	0	2	0	2	1	0	1	0	0	6
Norway (Walstad)	0	2	0	3	0	0	2	0	0	2	9

Sheet B	1	2	3	4	5	6	7	8	9	10	Final
Italy (Retornaz)	0	1	0	1	0	2	0	2	0	1	7
Germany (Baumann)	2	0	0	0	0	0	1	0	2	0	5

Sheet C	1	2	3	4	5	6	7	8	9	10	Final
China (Liu)	0	1	0	1	2	0	1	0	2	0	7
Sweden (Edin)	3	0	3	0	0	2	0	1	0	1	10

Sheet D	1	2	3	4	5	6	7	8	9	10	Final
United States (Shuster)	0	1	0	0	1	1	0	1	0	X	4
Switzerland (de Cruz)	1	0	0	2	0	0	2	0	2	X	7

=== Draw 3 ===
Sunday, April 2, 9:00

Sheet B	1	2	3	4	5	6	7	8	9	10	Final
Japan (Morozumi)	0	2	0	1	0	2	0	4	0	X	9
Netherlands (van Dorp)	2	0	0	0	1	0	2	0	1	X	6

Sheet C	1	2	3	4	5	6	7	8	9	10	Final
Russia (Stukalskiy)	0	0	2	0	1	0	X	X	X	X	3
Canada (Gushue)	2	4	0	2	0	3	X	X	X	X	11

=== Draw 4 ===
Sunday, April 2, 14:00

Sheet A	1	2	3	4	5	6	7	8	9	10	Final
Germany (Baumann)	0	1	0	0	0	1	0	X	X	X	2
Sweden (Edin)	0	0	2	3	0	0	3	X	X	X	8

Sheet B	1	2	3	4	5	6	7	8	9	10	Final
Switzerland (de Cruz)	0	1	0	2	0	0	0	3	0	X	6
Norway (Walstad)	0	0	1	0	0	1	0	0	1	X	3

Sheet C	1	2	3	4	5	6	7	8	9	10	Final
United States (Shuster)	0	1	0	0	2	0	1	0	X	X	4
Scotland (Murdoch)	1	0	0	2	0	1	0	5	X	X	9

Sheet D	1	2	3	4	5	6	7	8	9	10	Final
China (Liu)	0	0	1	0	0	1	0	1	0	X	3
Italy (Retornaz)	0	0	0	2	1	0	3	0	2	X	8

=== Draw 5 ===
Sunday, April 2, 19:00

Sheet A	1	2	3	4	5	6	7	8	9	10	Final
China (Liu)	0	2	0	2	0	1	0	4	0	X	9
Russia (Timofeev)	0	0	2	0	2	0	1	0	1	X	6

Sheet B	1	2	3	4	5	6	7	8	9	10	Final
Canada (Gushue)	0	2	0	0	0	2	0	2	2	0	8
Sweden (Edin)	2	0	0	2	0	0	1	0	0	1	6

Sheet C	1	2	3	4	5	6	7	8	9	10	Final
Norway (Walstad)	0	2	3	0	0	3	1	X	X	X	9
Netherlands (van Dorp)	0	0	0	1	1	0	0	X	X	X	2

Sheet D	1	2	3	4	5	6	7	8	9	10	Final
Japan (Morozumi)	0	2	0	1	0	0	1	0	0	X	4
Scotland (Murdoch)	1	0	2	0	2	1	0	0	1	X	7

=== Draw 6 ===
Monday, April 3, 9:00

Sheet A	1	2	3	4	5	6	7	8	9	10	Final
Italy (Retornaz)	0	0	2	0	1	0	1	0	2	0	6
United States (Shuster)	0	2	0	2	0	1	0	1	0	2	8

Sheet B	1	2	3	4	5	6	7	8	9	10	Final
Scotland (Murdoch)	1	0	2	0	1	0	2	0	1	0	7
China (Liu)	0	2	0	2	0	1	0	2	0	2	9

Sheet C	1	2	3	4	5	6	7	8	9	10	Final
Switzerland (de Cruz)	2	0	0	2	0	2	0	1	0	X	7
Germany (Baumann)	0	0	1	0	1	0	1	0	1	X	4

Sheet D	1	2	3	4	5	6	7	8	9	10	Final
Sweden (Edin)	0	1	0	2	0	1	0	0	4	0	8
Norway (Walstad)	0	0	1	0	1	0	1	2	0	1	6

=== Draw 7 ===
Monday, April 3, 14:00

Sheet A	1	2	3	4	5	6	7	8	9	10	Final
Netherlands (van Dorp)	0	1	1	0	1	0	X	X	X	X	3
China (Liu)	2	0	0	4	0	3	X	X	X	X	9

Sheet B	1	2	3	4	5	6	7	8	9	10	Final
Norway (Walstad)	0	0	1	1	0	1	0	1	0	1	5
Russia (Timofeev)	1	0	0	0	1	0	0	0	1	0	3

Sheet C	1	2	3	4	5	6	7	8	9	10	Final
Sweden (Edin)	2	0	1	0	0	2	0	1	0	2	8
Japan (Morozumi)	0	1	0	1	1	0	1	0	1	0	5

Sheet D	1	2	3	4	5	6	7	8	9	10	Final
Scotland (Murdoch)	0	1	0	0	0	1	0	X	X	X	2
Canada (Gushue)	2	0	2	2	1	0	1	X	X	X	8

=== Draw 8 ===
Monday, April 3, 19:00

Sheet A	1	2	3	4	5	6	7	8	9	10	Final
Russia (Timofeev)	0	1	0	0	0	1	X	X	X	X	2
Switzerland (de Cruz)	3	0	3	0	3	0	X	X	X	X	9

Sheet B	1	2	3	4	5	6	7	8	9	10	Final
Germany (Baumann)	0	0	1	0	1	0	0	2	0	X	4
Japan (Morozumi)	1	1	0	1	0	1	0	0	3	X	7

Sheet C	1	2	3	4	5	6	7	8	9	10	Final
Canada (Gushue)	3	0	0	0	1	3	1	X	X	X	8
United States (Shuster)	0	1	1	0	0	0	0	X	X	X	2

Sheet D	1	2	3	4	5	6	7	8	9	10	Final
Italy (Retornaz)	2	0	3	0	3	1	0	0	4	X	13
Netherlands (van Dorp)	0	1	0	3	0	0	1	1	0	X	6

=== Draw 9 ===
Tuesday, April 4, 9:00

Sheet A	1	2	3	4	5	6	7	8	9	10	Final
Sweden (Edin)	0	3	0	4	1	0	X	X	X	X	8
Italy (Retornaz)	0	0	1	0	0	1	X	X	X	X	2

Sheet B	1	2	3	4	5	6	7	8	9	10	Final
Switzerland (de Cruz)	1	0	2	0	0	1	0	0	0	2	6
Scotland (Murdoch)	0	1	0	2	0	0	0	0	2	0	5

Sheet C	1	2	3	4	5	6	7	8	9	10	Final
Germany (Baumann)	2	0	0	0	1	2	0	0	0	1	6
China (Liu)	0	0	0	2	0	0	1	1	1	0	5

Sheet D	1	2	3	4	5	6	7	8	9	10	Final
Norway (Walstad)	1	0	2	0	0	0	0	X	X	X	3
United States (Shuster)	0	3	0	0	4	1	1	X	X	X	9

=== Draw 10 ===
Tuesday, April 4, 14:00

Sheet A	1	2	3	4	5	6	7	8	9	10	Final
Japan (Morozumi)	0	0	0	2	0	2	0	4	0	1	9
Norway (Walstad)	1	2	1	0	1	0	1	0	1	0	7

Sheet B	1	2	3	4	5	6	7	8	9	10	Final
Canada (Gushue)	0	2	1	0	3	1	0	2	X	X	9
China (Liu)	2	0	0	1	0	0	1	0	X	X	4

Sheet C	1	2	3	4	5	6	7	8	9	10	Final
Scotland (Murdoch)	2	0	0	2	0	2	2	0	1	X	9
Netherlands (van Dorp)	0	1	1	0	1	0	0	2	0	X	5

Sheet D	1	2	3	4	5	6	7	8	9	10	Final
Sweden (Edin)	0	2	0	2	1	3	0	1	1	X	10
Russia (Timofeev)	1	0	2	0	0	0	2	0	0	X	5

=== Draw 11 ===
Tuesday, April 4, 19:00

Sheet A	1	2	3	4	5	6	7	8	9	10	Final
Germany (Baumann)	0	0	1	0	1	0	X	X	X	X	2
Canada (Gushue)	2	1	0	4	0	1	X	X	X	X	8

Sheet B	1	2	3	4	5	6	7	8	9	10	11	Final
United States (Shuster)	0	1	1	0	0	2	1	0	1	0	1	7
Japan (Morozumi)	1	0	0	1	2	0	0	1	0	1	0	6

Sheet C	1	2	3	4	5	6	7	8	9	10	Final
Russia (Timofeev)	0	0	2	0	2	1	0	0	0	X	5
Italy (Retornaz)	0	1	0	4	0	0	0	2	2	X	9

Sheet D	1	2	3	4	5	6	7	8	9	10	Final
Netherlands (van Dorp)	0	0	2	0	2	0	1	0	1	0	6
Switzerland (de Cruz)	1	1	0	2	0	1	0	1	0	3	9

=== Draw 12 ===
Wednesday, April 5, 9:00

Sheet A	1	2	3	4	5	6	7	8	9	10	Final
Sweden (Edin)	1	1	0	2	0	0	1	0	0	1	6
Scotland (Murdoch)	0	0	1	0	1	1	0	1	0	0	4

Sheet B	1	2	3	4	5	6	7	8	9	10	Final
Netherlands (van Dorp)	0	0	0	1	0	0	2	0	X	X	3
Canada (Gushue)	3	0	1	0	2	0	0	2	X	X	8

Sheet C	1	2	3	4	5	6	7	8	9	10	11	Final
China (Liu)	0	0	2	0	0	0	2	2	0	0	1	7
Norway (Walstad)	1	0	0	0	2	0	0	0	2	1	0	6

Sheet D	1	2	3	4	5	6	7	8	9	10	Final
Russia (Timofeev)	0	2	0	0	1	1	0	X	X	X	4
Japan (Morozumi)	4	0	2	3	0	0	3	X	X	X	12

=== Draw 13 ===
Wednesday, April 5, 14:00

Sheet A	1	2	3	4	5	6	7	8	9	10	Final
Canada (Gushue)	2	0	0	5	0	1	2	X	X	X	10
Japan (Morozumi)	0	0	1	0	1	0	0	X	X	X	2

Sheet B	1	2	3	4	5	6	7	8	9	10	Final
Italy (Retornaz)	0	0	1	0	0	2	0	0	1	0	4
Switzerland (de Cruz)	0	2	0	1	0	0	1	1	0	1	6

Sheet C	1	2	3	4	5	6	7	8	9	10	Final
Netherlands (van Dorp)	0	0	0	2	1	0	1	1	0	1	6
Russia (Timofeev)	0	0	2	0	0	1	0	0	1	0	4

Sheet D	1	2	3	4	5	6	7	8	9	10	Final
United States (Shuster)	0	1	0	2	0	2	0	3	0	X	8
Germany (Baumann)	0	0	1	0	2	0	1	0	1	X	5

=== Draw 14 ===
Wednesday, April 5, 19:00

Sheet A	1	2	3	4	5	6	7	8	9	10	11	Final
Norway (Walstad)	0	1	0	2	0	2	0	0	0	2	1	8
Germany (Baumann)	1	0	2	0	2	0	0	2	0	0	0	7

Sheet B	1	2	3	4	5	6	7	8	9	10	Final
China (Liu)	0	0	1	0	0	1	0	X	X	X	2
United States (Shuster)	2	1	0	2	2	0	1	X	X	X	8

Sheet C	1	2	3	4	5	6	7	8	9	10	Final
Italy (Retornaz)	0	0	1	1	0	0	0	0	0	X	2
Scotland (Murdoch)	2	0	0	0	1	1	1	0	1	X	6

Sheet D	1	2	3	4	5	6	7	8	9	10	Final
Switzerland (de Cruz)	0	2	0	1	0	1	0	X	X	X	4
Sweden (Edin)	2	0	2	0	1	0	5	X	X	X	10

=== Draw 15 ===
Thursday, April 6, 9:00

Sheet A	1	2	3	4	5	6	7	8	9	10	Final
United States (Shuster)	2	0	0	2	0	1	0	0	0	1	6
Netherlands (van Dorp)	0	2	1	0	1	0	0	1	0	0	5

Sheet B	1	2	3	4	5	6	7	8	9	10	Final
Russia (Timofeev)	2	0	1	0	1	3	0	0	0	0	7
Germany (Baumann)	0	3	0	1	0	0	1	1	1	2	9

Sheet C	1	2	3	4	5	6	7	8	9	10	Final
Japan (Morozumi)	0	0	2	1	0	0	0	1	1	0	5
Switzerland (de Cruz)	1	1	0	0	0	2	1	0	0	1	6

Sheet D	1	2	3	4	5	6	7	8	9	10	Final
Canada (Gushue)	0	2	0	5	0	2	X	X	X	X	9
Italy (Retornaz)	0	0	1	0	1	0	X	X	X	X	2

=== Draw 16 ===
Thursday, April 6, 14:00

Sheet A	1	2	3	4	5	6	7	8	9	10	Final
Switzerland (de Cruz)	0	1	0	0	0	2	0	2	0	X	5
China (Liu)	1	0	2	1	0	0	1	0	3	X	8

Sheet B	1	2	3	4	5	6	7	8	9	10	Final
Norway (Walstad)	1	0	1	0	0	2	1	2	0	X	7
Italy (Retornaz)	0	2	0	1	1	0	0	0	1	X	5

Sheet C	1	2	3	4	5	6	7	8	9	10	Final
United States (Shuster)	0	2	0	2	0	1	0	2	X	X	7
Sweden (Edin)	1	0	0	0	1	0	1	0	X	X	3

Sheet D	1	2	3	4	5	6	7	8	9	10	Final
Germany (Baumann)	0	0	0	1	0	0	0	0	0	X	1
Scotland (Murdoch)	0	0	2	0	0	1	0	1	3	X	7

=== Draw 17 ===
Thursday, April 6, 19:00

Sheet A	1	2	3	4	5	6	7	8	9	10	11	Final
Scotland (Murdoch)	1	0	1	0	0	1	1	0	2	0	1	7
Russia (Timofeev)	0	2	0	1	1	0	0	1	0	1	0	6

Sheet B	1	2	3	4	5	6	7	8	9	10	Final
Sweden (Edin)	2	1	0	0	0	2	0	3	X	X	8
Netherlands (van Dorp)	0	0	1	0	0	0	1	0	X	X	2

Sheet C	1	2	3	4	5	6	7	8	9	10	Final
Norway (Walstad)	0	1	0	1	0	1	0	1	X	X	4
Canada (Gushue)	1	0	4	0	2	0	1	0	X	X	8

Sheet D	1	2	3	4	5	6	7	8	9	10	Final
Japan (Morozumi)	0	0	0	0	2	0	X	X	X	X	2
China (Liu)	3	2	1	1	0	2	X	X	X	X	9

== Playoffs ==
Page playoff system
1	Canada	7
2	Sweden	4
3	Switzerland	11
4	United States	4

Semifinal
2	Sweden	6
3	Switzerland	5

Gold medal game
1	Canada	4
2	Sweden	2

Bronze medal game
3	Switzerland	7
4	United States	5

=== 1 vs. 2 ===
Friday, April 7, 19:00

Team	1	2	3	4	5	6	7	8	9	10	Final
Canada (Gushue)	1	1	1	0	0	0	3	0	1	X	7
Sweden (Edin)	0	0	0	1	0	1	0	2	0	X	4

Player percentages
Canada		Sweden	
Geoff Walker	93%	Christoffer Sundgren	98%
Brett Gallant	93%	Rasmus Wranå	98%
Mark Nichols	90%	Oskar Eriksson	81%
Brad Gushue	88%	Niklas Edin	70%
Total	91%	Total	87%

=== 3 vs. 4 ===
Saturday, April 8, 14:00

Team	1	2	3	4	5	6	7	8	9	10	Final
Switzerland (de Cruz)	2	0	2	2	0	2	0	3	X	X	11
United States (Shuster)	0	2	0	0	1	0	1	0	X	X	4

Player percentages
Switzerland		United States	
Valentin Tanner	81%	John Landsteiner	95%
Peter de Cruz	92%	Matt Hamilton	80%
Claudio Pätz	86%	Tyler George	72%
Benoît Schwarz	95%	John Shuster	70%
Total	89%	Total	79%

=== Semifinal ===
Saturday, April 8, 19:00

Team	1	2	3	4	5	6	7	8	9	10	11	Final
Sweden (Edin)	0	1	0	0	2	0	2	0	0	0	1	6
Switzerland (de Cruz)	0	0	2	0	0	1	0	1	0	1	0	5

Player percentages
Sweden		Switzerland	
Christoffer Sundgren	83%	Valentin Tanner	84%
Rasmus Wranå	92%	Peter de Cruz	95%
Oskar Eriksson	97%	Claudio Pätz	78%
Niklas Edin	89%	Benoît Schwarz	77%
Total	90%	Total	84%

=== Bronze medal game ===
Sunday, April 9, 12:00

Team	1	2	3	4	5	6	7	8	9	10	Final
United States (Shuster)	1	0	1	1	0	0	0	1	0	1	5
Switzerland (de Cruz)	0	2	0	0	0	0	4	0	1	0	7

Player percentages
United States		Switzerland	
John Landsteiner	95%	Valentin Tanner	86%
Matt Hamilton	83%	Peter de Cruz	88%
Tyler George	76%	Claudio Pätz	83%
John Shuster	84%	Benoît Schwarz	87%
Total	84%	Total	86%

=== Gold medal game ===
Sunday, April 9, 18:00

Team	1	2	3	4	5	6	7	8	9	10	Final
Canada (Gushue)	0	1	0	1	0	0	0	0	2	X	4
Sweden (Edin)	0	0	1	0	1	0	0	0	0	X	2

Player percentages
Canada		Sweden	
Geoff Walker	89%	Christoffer Sundgren	90%
Brett Gallant	86%	Rasmus Wranå	73%
Mark Nichols	85%	Oskar Eriksson	83%
Brad Gushue	91%	Niklas Edin	88%
Total	88%	Total	84%

2017 World Men's Curling Championship winner
(Canada)
Canada
36th title

== Statistics ==
=== Top 5 player percentages ===
Round robin only

Leads	%
(Canada) Geoff Walker	92
(Scotland) Michael Goodfellow	91
(Sweden) Christoffer Sundgren	90
(China) Zang Jialiang	88
(Switzerland) Valentin Tanner	87

Seconds	%
(Canada) Brett Gallant	92
(Norway) Magnus Nedregotten	89
(Scotland) Scott Andrews	87
(Sweden) Rasmus Wranå	85
(Switzerland) Peter de Cruz (Skip)	85

Thirds	%
(Canada) Mark Nichols	90
(Sweden) Oskar Eriksson	87
(United States) Tyler George	86
(Scotland) Greg Drummond	83
(Switzerland) Claudio Pätz	83

Skips	%
(Canada) Brad Gushue	93
(United States) John Shuster	85
(Sweden) Niklas Edin	84
(Scotland) David Murdoch	84
(Switzerland) Benoît Schwarz (Fourth)	83

=== Perfect games ===
Round Robin only

Player	Team	Position	Shots	Opponent
Brad Gushue	Canada	Skip	–	Russia
Michael Goodfellow	Scotland	Lead	–	Canada
Christoffer Sundgren	Sweden	Lead	–	Italy
Brad Gushue	Canada	Skip	–	Germany
Mark Nichols	Canada	Third	–	Germany
Ryan Sherrard	Germany	Lead	–	Canada
Brett Gallant	Canada	Second	–	Netherlands
Brett Gallant	Canada	Second	–	Japan
John Shuster	United States	Skip	–	China
Geoff Walker	Canada	Lead	–	Norway

== Awards ==
The awards and all-star team are as follows:

All-Star Team

- Skip: Brad Gushue, Canada
- Third: Mark Nichols, Canada
- Second: Brett Gallant, Canada
- Lead: Geoff Walker, Canada

Collie Campbell Memorial Award

- Carlo Glasbergen, Netherlands
