= Claudio Pätz =

Swiss curler (born 1987)

- Curler
- Born: 1 July 1987 (age 39); Zürich, Switzerland

Team
- Curling club: CC Genève; Geneva, SUI
- Skip: Peter de Cruz
- Fourth: Benoît Schwarz
- Third: Sven Michel
- Lead: Valentin Tanner
- Alternate: Claudio Pätz

Curling career
- Member Association: Switzerland
- World Championship: 4 (2013, 2014, 2017, 2019)
- European Championship: 6 (2011, 2012, 2013, 2015, 2016, 2017)
- Olympic: 2 (2014, 2018)
- Grand Slam victories: 1 (2018 Canadian Open)
Medal record
Men's curling
Representing Switzerland
Olympic Games
Bronze medal – third place	2018 Pyeongchang	Team
World Championships
Bronze medal – third place	2014 Beijing
Bronze medal – third place	2017 Edmonton
Bronze medal – third place	2019 Lethbridge
European Championships
Gold medal – first place	2013 Stavanger
Silver medal – second place	2015 Esbjerg
Bronze medal – third place	2016 Renfrewshire
Bronze medal – third place	2017 St Gallen
World Junior Championships
Bronze medal – third place	2007 Eveleth
European Mixed Championship
Silver medal – second place	2010 Howwood

Claudio Pätz (born 1 July 1987) is a Swiss curler from Uster. He won a bronze medal at the 2018 Winter Olympics, a gold medal with the Swiss team at the 2013 European Curling Championships in Stavanger and a bronze medal at the 2014 World Men's Curling Championship as the alternate for the Swiss team. He competed at the 2013 World Curling Championships, and at the 2014 Winter Olympics in Sochi.

== Personal life ==
Pätz is employed as an accountant. and is married. His sister is world champion curler, Alina Pätz.
