= 2014 Baden Masters =

World Curling Tour event

- Host city: Baden, Switzerland
- Arena: Curling Center Baden Regio
- Dates: August 29–31
- Winner: (Norway) Thomas Ulsrud
- Curling club: Snarøen CC, Oslo
- Skip: Thomas Ulsrud
- Third: Torger Nergård
- Second: Christoffer Svae
- Lead: Håvard Vad Petersson
- Finalist: (Switzerland) Peter de Cruz

The 2014 Baden Masters were held from August 29 to 31 at the Curling Center Baden Regio in Baden, Switzerland as part of the 2014–15 World Curling Tour and the European Curling Champions Tour. The event was the first tournament of the season for both tours. The event was held in a round robin format, and the purse for the event was CHF 32,500, of which the winner, Thomas Ulsrud, received CHF 13,030. Ulsrud and his team from Norway defeated the Peter de Cruz rink from Geneva in the final with a score of 6–5. It was the second time the Ulrsud rink won the event (they had previously won in 2008).

== Teams ==
The teams are listed as follows:

Skip	Third	Second	Lead	Locale
Felix Attinger	Bastian Brun	Daniel Schifferli	Urs Kuhn	Dubendorf, Switzerland
Alexander Baumann	Manuel Walter	Sebastian Schweizer	Marc Bastian	Füssen, Germany
Tom Brewster	Glen Muirhead	Ross Paterson	Hammy McMillan Jr.	Aberdeen, Scotland
Michael Brunner	Marc Wagenseil	Remo Herzog	Raymond Krenger	Switzerland
Benoît Schwarz (fourth)	Peter de Cruz (skip)	Claudio Pätz	Valentin Tanner	Geneva, Switzerland
Alexey Stukalskiy (fourth)	Evgeniy Arkhipov	Andrey Drozdov (skip)	Petr Dron	Moscow, Russia
Niklas Edin	Oskar Eriksson	Kristian Lindström	Christoffer Sundgren	Karlstad, Sweden
Mario Freiberger	Sven Iten	Reto Seiler	Paddy Käser	Zug, Switzerland
Ritvars Gulbis	Normunds Šaršūns	Aivars Avotiņš	Artūrs Gerhards	Riga, Latvia
Christian Bangerter (fourth)	Stefan Häsler (skip)	Patrick Ryf	Chahan Karnusian	Bern, Switzerland
Steve Laycock	Kirk Muyres	Colton Flasch	Dallan Muyres	(Canada) Saskatoon, Saskatchewan
Sven Michel	Florian Meister	Simon Gempeler	Stefan Meienberg	Adelboden, Switzerland
David Murdoch	Greg Drummond	Scott Andrews	Michael Goodfellow	Stirling, Scotland
Marc Pfister	Enrico Pfister	Reto Keller	Raphael Märki	Bern, Switzerland
Manuel Ruch	Jean-Nicolas Longchamp	Roman Ruch	Mathias Graf	Uitikon, Switzerland
Jiří Snítil	Lukas Klima	Martin Snítil	Jindřich Kitzberger	Prague, Czech Republic
Rasmus Stjerne	Mikkel Krause	Oliver Dupont	Troels Harry	Hvidovre, Denmark
Thomas Ulsrud	Torger Nergård	Christoffer Svae	Håvard Vad Petersson	Oslo, Norway
Mikel Unanue	Inaki Lasuen	Victor Mirete	Avelino Garcia	San Sebastián, Spain
Jaap van Dorp	Carlo Glasbergen	Wouter Gosgens	Joey Bruinsma	Zoetermeer, Netherlands

== Round robin standings ==
After Draw 10

Pool A	W	L
(Switzerland) Sven Michel	3	1
(Russia) Andrey Drozdov	3	1
(Canada) Steve Laycock	3	1
(Switzerland) Michael Brunner	1	3
(Spain) Mikel Unanue	0	4

Pool B	W	L
(Norway) Thomas Ulsrud	4	0
(Switzerland) Marc Pfister	3	1
(Scotland) Tom Brewster	2	2
(Latvia) Ritvars Gulbis	1	3
(Switzerland) Stefan Häsler	0	4

Pool C	W	L
(Switzerland) Peter de Cruz	4	0
(Sweden) Niklas Edin	3	1
(Switzerland) Felix Attinger	2	2
(Czech Republic) Jiří Snítil	1	3
(Germany) Alexander Baumann	0	4

Pool D	W	L
(Switzerland) Manuel Ruch	3	1
(Scotland) David Murdoch	3	1
(Switzerland) Mario Freiberger	2	2
(Netherlands) Jaap van Dorp	1	3
(Denmark) Rasmus Stjerne	1	3

== Playoffs ==
Quarterfinals
(Norway) Thomas Ulsrud	8
(Russia) Andrey Drozdov	3
(Switzerland) Manuel Ruch	3
(Sweden) Niklas Edin	5
(Switzerland) Sven Michel	5
(Switzerland) Marc Pfister	4
(Switzerland) Peter de Cruz	8
(Scotland) David Murdoch	3

Semifinals
(Norway) Thomas Ulsrud	7
(Sweden) Niklas Edin	6
(Switzerland) Sven Michel	2
(Switzerland) Peter de Cruz	4

Final
(Norway) Thomas Ulsrud	6
(Switzerland) Peter de Cruz	5
