= 2012 Baden Masters =

- Host city: Baden, Switzerland
- Arena: Curling Center Baden Regio
- Dates: August 31 – September 2
- Winner: (Switzerland) Sven Michel
- Curling club: Adelboden, Switzerland
- Skip: Sven Michel
- Third: Claudio Pätz
- Second: Sandro Trolliet
- Lead: Simon Gempeler
- Finalist: (Switzerland) Peter de Cruz

The 2012 Baden Masters were held from August 31 to September 2 in Baden, Switzerland. It was the first event of the men's World Curling Tour for the 2012–13 curling season. The total purse of the event was 29,000 Swiss francs (CHF).

In the final, Sven Michel defeated Peter de Cruz with a 7–5 tally, winning 11,000 CHF of the prize money.

== Teams ==
The teams are listed as follows:

Skip	Third	Second	Lead	Locale
Alex Attinger	Felix Attinger	Daniel Schifferli	Simon Attinger	Switzerland
Tom Brewster	Greg Drummond	Scott Andrews	Michael Goodfellow	Aberdeen, Scotland
Benoît Schwarz (fourth)	Peter de Cruz (skip)	Dominik Märki	Valentin Tanner	Switzerland
Tony Angiboust (fourth)	Thomas Dufour (skip)	Lionel Roux	Wilfrid Coulot	Chamonix, France
Niklas Edin	Sebastian Kraupp	Fredrik Lindberg	Viktor Kjäll	Karlstad, Sweden
Kristian Lindström (fourth)	Oskar Eriksson (skip)	Markus Eriksson	Christoffer Sundgren	Lit, Sweden
Mario Freiberger	Sven Iten	Pascal Eicher	Rainer Kobler	Switzerland
Brad Gushue	Adam Casey	Brett Gallant	Geoff Walker	St. John's, Canada
Pascal Hess	Yves Hess	Florian Meister	Stefan Meienberg	Switzerland
Stefan Häsler	Christian Bangerter	Christian Roth	Jörg Lüthy	Switzerland
Andy Lang	Daniel Herberg	Daniel Neuner	Andreas Kempf	Füssen, Germany
Aku Kauste	Jani Sullanmaa	Pauli Jäämies	Janne Pitko	Finland
Sven Michel	Claudio Pätz	Sandro Trolliet	Simon Gempeler	Adelboden, Switzerland
Meico Öhninger	Andri Heimann	Kyrill Öhninger	Kevin Wunderlin	Switzerland
Marc Pfister	Roger Meier	Enrico Pfister	Raphael Märki	Switzerland
Jiří Snítil	Martin Snítil	Jindřich Kitzberger	Marek Vydra	Prague, Czech Republic
Rasmus Stjerne	Johnny Frederiksen	Mikkel Poulsen	Troels Harry	Hvidovre, Denmark
Alexey Tselousov	Alexey Stukalsky	Andrey Drozdov	Artur Razhabov	Moscow, Russia
Thomas Ulsrud	Torger Nergård	Christoffer Svae	Håvard Vad Petersson	Oslo, Norway
Bernhard Werthemann	Bastian Brun	Florian Zürrer	Paddy Käser	Switzerland

== Round-robin standings ==
Group A	W	L
(Switzerland) Peter de Cruz	3	1
(Sweden) Oskar Eriksson	2	2
(Switzerland) Alex Attinger	2	2
(Scotland) Tom Brewster	2	2
(Switzerland) Meico Öhninger	1	3

Group B	W	L
(Canada) Brad Gushue	3	1
(Denmark) Rasmus Stjerne	3	1
(Switzerland) Bernhard Werthemann	2	2
(Switzerland) Marc Pfister	1	3
(Russia) Alexey Tselousov	1	3

Group C	W	L
(Sweden) Niklas Edin	3	1
(Switzerland) Mario Freiberger	3	1
(Switzerland) Pascal Hess	3	1
(Finland) Aku Kauste	1	3
(Germany) Andy Lang	0	4

Group D	W	L
(Switzerland) Sven Michel	4	0
(Switzerland) Stefan Häsler	2	2
(France) Thomas Dufour	2	2
(Norway) Thomas Ulsrud	2	2
(Czech Republic) Jiří Snítil	0	4

== Playoffs ==
Quarterfinals
(Switzerland) Peter de Cruz	5
(Canada) Brad Gushue	3
(Switzerland) Mario Freiberger	6
(Switzerland) Stefan Häsler	5
(Denmark) Rasmus Stjerne	8
(Sweden) Oskar Eriksson	3
(Switzerland) Sven Michel	5
(Sweden) Niklas Edin	1

Semifinals
(Switzerland) Peter de Cruz	7
(Switzerland) Mario Freiberger	3
(Denmark) Rasmus Stjerne	4
(Switzerland) Sven Michel	5

Finals
(Switzerland) Peter de Cruz	5
(Switzerland) Sven Michel	7
