= 2013 Baden Masters =

- Host city: Baden, Switzerland
- Arena: Curling Center Baden Regio
- Dates: August 30 – September 1
- Winner: (Canada) Brad Gushue
- Curling club: Bally Haly G&CC, St. John's
- Skip: Brad Gushue
- Third: Brett Gallant
- Second: Adam Casey
- Lead: Geoff Walker
- Finalist: (Norway) Thomas Ulsrud

The 2013 Baden Masters were held from August 30 to September 1 at the Curling Center Baden Regio in Baden, Switzerland. The event was held in a round robin format, and the purse for the event was CHF 32,500, of which the winner, Brad Gushue, received CHF 11,000. Gushue defeated Thomas Ulsrud with a score of 4–3 in the final in an extra end to win his third Baden Masters title.

== Teams ==
The teams are listed as follows:

Skip	Third	Second	Lead	Locale
Evgeniy Arkhipov	Sergei Glukhov	Dmitry Mironov	Artur Ali	Moscow, Russia
Alexander Attinger	Felix Attinger	Daniel Schifferli	Simon Attinger	Dübendorf, Switzerland
Benoît Schwarz (fourth)	Peter de Cruz (skip)	Dominik Märki	Valentin Tanner	Geneva, Switzerland
Alexey Stukalskiy (fourth)	Andrey Drozdov (skip)	Artur Razhabov	Petr Dron	Moscow, Russia
Tony Angiboust (fourth)	Thomas Dufour (skip)	Wilfrid Coulot	Jérémy Frarier	France
Niklas Edin	Sebastian Kraupp	Fredrik Lindberg	Viktor Kjäll	Karlstad, Sweden
Oskar Eriksson	Kristian Lindström	Markus Eriksson	Christoffer Sundgren	Lit, Sweden
Mario Freiberger	Sven Iten	Patrick Poll	Rainer Kobler	Zug, Switzerland
Ritvars Gulbis	Normunds Šaršūns	Aivars Avotiņš	Artūrs Gerhards	Latvia
Brad Gushue	Brett Gallant	Adam Casey	Geoff Walker	(Canada) St. John's, Newfoundland and Labrador
Pascal Hess	Florian Meister	Meico Öhninger	Stefan Meienberg	Zug, Switzerland
Stefan Häsler	Christian Bangerter	Urs Zahnd	Jörg Lüthy	Switzerland
Felix Schulze (fourth)	John Jahr (skip)	Christopher Bartsch	Sven Goldemann	Germany
Sven Michel	Claudio Pätz	Sandro Trolliet	Simon Gempeler	Adelboden, Switzerland
David Murdoch	Tom Brewster	Greg Drummond	Michael Goodfellow	Stirling, Scotland
Marc Pfister	Roger Meier	Enrico Pfister	Raphael Märki	Switzerland
Jiří Snítil	Martin Snítil	Jindřich Kitzberger	Marek Vydra	Czech Republic
Rasmus Stjerne	Johnny Frederiksen	Mikkel Poulsen	Troels Harry	Denmark
Thomas Ulsrud	Torger Nergård	Christoffer Svae	Håvard Vad Petersson	Oslo, Norway
Bernhard Werthemann	Bastian Brun	Yves Hess	Paddy Käser	Switzerland

== Round-robin standings ==
Final round-robin standings

Pool A	W	L
(Switzerland) Sven Michel	4	0
(Sweden) Niklas Edin	2	2
(Russia) Andrey Drozdov	2	2
(Switzerland) Marc Pfister	1	3
(France) Thomas Dufour	1	3

Pool B	W	L
(Norway) Thomas Ulsrud	4	0
(Denmark) Rasmus Stjerne	3	1
(Switzerland) Mario Freiberger	2	2
(Switzerland) Bernhard Werthemann	1	3
(Latvia) Ritvars Gulbis	0	4

Pool C	W	L
(Canada) Brad Gushue	4	0
(Switzerland) Stefan Häsler	2	2
(Sweden) Oskar Eriksson	2	2
(Switzerland) Peter de Cruz	1	3
(Germany) John Jahr	1	3

Pool D	W	L
(Switzerland) Pascal Hess	4	0
(Switzerland) Alexander Attinger	2	2
(Russia) Evgeny Arkhipov	2	2
(Scotland) David Murdoch	1	3
(Czech Republic) Jiří Snítil	1	3

== Playoffs ==
Quarterfinals
(Switzerland) Sven Michel	4
(Denmark) Rasmus Stjerne	2
(Canada) Brad Gushue	7
(Switzerland) Alexander Attinger	2
(Norway) Thomas Ulsrud	8
(Sweden) Niklas Edin	3
(Switzerland) Pascal Hess	7
(Switzerland) Stefan Häsler	6

Semifinals
(Switzerland) Sven Michel	1
(Canada) Brad Gushue	8
(Norway) Thomas Ulsrud	6
(Switzerland) Pascal Hess	4

Final
(Canada) Brad Gushue	4
(Norway) Thomas Ulsrud	3
