= Baden Masters =

Curling tournament in Switzerland

- Established: 2000
- 2026 host city: Baden, Switzerland
- 2026 arena: Curling Club Baden Regio
- Purse: CHF 25,000
- 2026 champion: (Switzerland) Yannick Schwaller

Current edition
- 2026 Baden Masters

The Baden Masters is an annual men's curling tournament, held in early September/late August in Baden, Switzerland. It is the first curling tournament of the World Curling Tour season. It was first held in 2000.

In 2021, for the first time in the event's twenty-one year history, two women's teams competed alongside the men's field: 2018 Olympic Gold Medalists Team Anna Hasselborg from Sweden and Team Irene Schori of Limmattal, Switzerland.

== Past champions ==
Year	Winner	Runner-up	Purse (CHF)
2000	(Switzerland) Andreas Schwaller		
2002	(Switzerland) Andre Flotron	(Switzerland) Ralph Stöckli	9,500
2003	(Germany) Sebastian Stock		
2004	(Switzerland) Andreas Schwaller, Christof Schwaller, Marco Ramstein, Roland Moser		
2005	(Switzerland) Andreas Schwaller, Andreas Hänni, Thomas Lips, Damian Grichting	(Norway) Pål Trulsen, Lars Vågberg, Flemming Davanger, Bent Anund Ramsfjell	26,500
2006	(Canada) Kerry Burtnyk, Dan Kammerlock, Richard Daneault, Cory Naharnie	(Switzerland) Andreas Schwaller, Andreas Hänni, Thomas Lips, Damian Grichting	25,000
2007	(Canada) Brad Gushue, Mark Nichols, Chris Schille, David Noftall	(Germany) Andy Kapp, Uli Kapp, Andreas Lang, Andreas Kempf	25,000
2008	(Norway) Thomas Ulsrud, Torger Nergård, Christoffer Svae, Jan Thoresen	(Scotland) David Murdoch, Graeme Connal, Peter Smith, Euan Byers	26,500
2009	(Canada) Brad Gushue, Mark Nichols, Ryan Fry, Jamie Korab	(Norway) Thomas Ulsrud, Torger Nergård, Christoffer Svae, Håvard Vad Petersson	26,500
2010	(Switzerland) Toni Müller, Thomas Lips, Remo Schmid, Simon Strübin	(Canada) Brad Gushue, Randy Ferbey, Mark Nichols, Ryan Fry	26,500
2011	(Switzerland) Sven Michel, Claudio Pätz, Sandro Trolliet, Simon Gempeler	(Scotland) Tom Brewster, Greg Drummond, Scott Andrews, Michael Goodfellow	31,000
2012	(Switzerland) Sven Michel, Claudio Pätz, Sandro Trolliet, Simon Gempeler	(Switzerland) Peter de Cruz, Benoît Schwarz, Dominik Märki, Valentin Tanner	31,000
2013	(Canada) Brad Gushue, Brett Gallant, Adam Casey, Geoff Walker	(Norway) Thomas Ulsrud, Torger Nergård, Christoffer Svae, Håvard Vad Petersson	32,500
2014	(Norway) Thomas Ulsrud, Torger Nergård, Christoffer Svae, Håvard Vad Petersson	(Switzerland) Benoît Schwarz (Fourth), Peter de Cruz (Skip), Claudio Pätz, Valentin Tanner	31,000
2015	(Sweden) Niklas Edin, Oskar Eriksson, Kristian Lindström, Christoffer Sundgren	(Scotland) Tom Brewster, Glen Muirhead, Ross Paterson, Hammy McMillan Jr.	32,500
2016	(Switzerland) Benoît Schwarz (Fourth), Claudio Pätz, Peter de Cruz (Skip), Valentin Tanner	(Norway) Thomas Ulsrud, Torger Nergård, Christoffer Svae, Håvard Vad Petersson	32,500
2017	(Sweden) Niklas Edin, Oskar Eriksson, Rasmus Wranå, Christoffer Sundgren	(Norway) Thomas Ulsrud, Torger Nergård, Christoffer Svae, Håvard Vad Petersson	33,000
2018	(Norway) Thomas Ulsrud, Torger Nergård, Christoffer Svae, Håvard Vad Petersson	(Sweden) Niklas Edin, Oskar Eriksson, Rasmus Wranå, Christoffer Sundgren	33,000
2019	(Switzerland) Yannick Schwaller, Michael Brunner, Romano Meier, Marcel Käufeler	(Sweden) Niklas Edin, Oskar Eriksson, Rasmus Wranå, Christoffer Sundgren	33,000
2020	(Sweden) Niklas Edin, Oskar Eriksson, Rasmus Wranå, Christoffer Sundgren	(Netherlands) Wouter Gösgens (Fourth), Jaap van Dorp (Skip), Laurens Hoekman, Carlo Glasbergen	33,000
2021	(Switzerland) Yannick Schwaller, Michael Brunner, Romano Meier, Marcel Käufeler	(Switzerland) Benoît Schwarz (Fourth), Sven Michel, Peter de Cruz (Skip), Valentin Tanner	35,000
2022	(Norway) Steffen Walstad, Magnus Nedregotten, Mathias Brænden, Magnus Vågberg	(Netherlands) Wouter Gösgens, Laurens Hoekman, Jaap van Dorp, Alexander Magan	35,000
2023	(Italy) Joël Retornaz, Amos Mosaner, Sebastiano Arman, Mattia Giovanella	(Scotland) Cameron Bryce, Duncan Menzies, Luke Carson, Robin McCall	35,000
2024	(Scotland) Bruce Mouat, Grant Hardie, Bobby Lammie, Hammy McMillan Jr.	(Switzerland) Benoît Schwarz-van Berkel (Fourth), Yannick Schwaller (Skip), Sven Michel, Pablo Lachat-Couchepin	35,000
2025	(Switzerland) Philipp Hösli (Fourth), Marco Hösli (Skip), Simon Gloor, Justin Hausherr	(Switzerland) Benoît Schwarz-van Berkel (Fourth), Yannick Schwaller (Skip), Sven Michel, Pablo Lachat-Couchepin	35,000
2026	(Switzerland) Benoît Schwarz-van Berkel (Fourth), Yannick Schwaller (Skip), Sven Michel, Pablo Lachat-Couchepin	(Italy) Joël Retornaz, Stefano Gilli, Andrea Gilli, Alberto Pimpini	25,000
