= 2011 Baden Masters =

- Host city: Baden, Switzerland
- Arena: Curling Center Baden Regio
- Dates: Sept. 2-4
- Winner: (Switzerland) Sven Michel
- Curling club: Adelboden, Switzerland
- Skip: Sven Michel
- Third: Claudio Pätz
- Second: Sandro Trolliet
- Lead: Simon Gempeler
- Finalist: (Scotland) Tom Brewster

The 2011 Baden Masters were held from September 2 to 4 in Baden, Switzerland. It was the first event of the Men's World Curling Tour for the 2011–12 curling season. The total purse of the event was 29,000 Swiss francs (CHF).

== Participating teams ==
Skip	Third	Second	Lead	Locale
Tom Brewster	Greg Drummond	Scott Andrews	Michael Goodfellow	Aberdeen, Scotland
Benoit Schwarz (fourth)	Peter de Cruz (skip)	Gilles Vuille	Valentin Tanner	Switzerland
Niklas Edin	Sebastian Kraupp	Fredrik Lindberg	Viktor Kjäll	Karlstad, Sweden
Kristian Lindstrom (fourth)	Oskar Eriksson (skip)	Henrik Leek	Alexander Lindstrom	Lit, Sweden
Ritvars Gulbis	Ainars Gulbis	Normunds Sarsuns	Aivars Avotins	Riga, Latvia
Toni Müller (fourth)	Jan Hauser (skip)	Marco Ramstein	Jurg Bamert	Zürich, Switzerland
Pascal Hess	Yves Hess	Florian Meister	Stefan Meienberg	Switzerland
Andy Kapp	Andreas Lang	Daniel Neuner	Andreas Kempf	Füssen, Germany
Sven Michel	Claudio Pätz	Sandro Trolliet	Simon Gempeler	Adelboden, Switzerland
David Murdoch	Glen Muirhead	Ross Paterson	Richard Woods	Lockerbie, Scotland
Mark Neeleman	Mark Rurup	Erik van der Zwan	Marcel Rijkes	Zoetermeer, Netherlands
Meico Öhninger	Andri Heimann	Kevin Wunderlin	Fabian Schmid	Switzerland
Claudio Pescia	Sven Iten	Reto Seiler	Rainer Kobler	St. Gallen, Switzerland
Manuel Ruch	Jean-Nicolas Longchamp	Daniel Graf	Renato Hachler	Switzerland
Jiří Snítil	Martin Snítil	Jindrich Kitzberger	Marek Vydra	Prague, Czech Republic
Rasmus Stjerne	Johnny Frederiksen	Mikkel Poulsen	Troels Harry	Hvidovre, Denmark
Alexey Tselousov	Andrey Drozdov	Alexey Stukalsky	Aleksey Kamnev	Moscow, Russia
Thomas Ulsrud	Torger Nergård	Christoffer Svae	Håvard Vad Petersson	Oslo, Norway
Markku Uusipaavalniemi	Toni Anttila	Kasper Hakunti	Joni Ikonen	Helsinki, Finland
Bernhard Werthemann	Bastian Brun	Daniel Widmer	Roger Stucki	Switzerland

== Draw ==
Group A	W	L
(Switzerland) Hess	4	0
(Finland) Uusipaavalniemi	2	2
(Sweden) Edin	2	2
(Czech Republic) Snítil	1	3
(Switzerland) Werthemann	1	3

Group B	W	L
(Scotland) Murdoch	4	0
(Switzerland) Michel	2	2
(Switzerland) Hauser	2	2
(Sweden) Eriksson	1	3
(Russia) Tselousov	1	3

Group C	W	L
(Germany) Kapp	3	1
(Switzerland) Oehninger	2	2
(Switzerland) Ruch	2	2
(Denmark) Stjerne	2	2
(Netherlands) Neeleman	1	3

Group D	W	L
(Scotland) Brewster	3	1
(Norway) Ulsrud	3	1
(Switzerland) de Cruz	2	2
(Switzerland) Pescia	2	2
(Latvia) Gulbis	0	4

== Playoffs ==
Quarterfinals
(Switzerland) Hess	3
(Switzerland) Michel	6
(Germany) Kapp	9
(Norway) Ulsrud	2
(Scotland) Murdoch	7
(Finland) Uusipaavalniemi	6
(Scotland) Brewster	6
(Switzerland) Öhninger	5

Semifinals
(Switzerland) Michel	7
(Germany) Kapp	3
(Scotland) Murdoch	3
(Scotland) Brewster	6

Final
(Switzerland) Michel	7
(Scotland) Brewster	3
