= 2026 Baden Masters =

World Curling Tour event

- Host city: Baden, Switzerland
- Arena: Curling Club Baden Regio
- Dates: August 13–16
- Winner: (Switzerland) Team Schwaller
- Curling club: CC Genève, Geneva
- Skip: Yannick Schwaller
- Fourth: Benoît Schwarz-van Berkel
- Second: Sven Michel
- Lead: Pablo Lachat-Couchepin
- Coach: Håvard Vad Petersson
- Finalist: (Italy) Joël Retornaz

The 2026 Baden Masters was held from August 13 to 16 at the Curling Club Baden Regio in Baden, Switzerland as part of the World Curling Tour. The event was held in a round-robin format with a purse of 25,000 CHF. It was the first men's event of the 2026–27 World Curling Tour. The event category for the event was 500.

The Olympic bronze medalists Team Yannick Schwaller continued their momentum from the 2025–26 season, winning the event in an 8–3 decision over Joël Retornaz' new look Italian rink. Both teams finished 4–1 through the round robin, tied atop their pools with Stefano Spiller and Magnus Ramsfjell respectively. Retornaz and Spiller earned byes to the semifinals where Schwaller and Ramsfjell beat Michael Brunner and Marco Hösli in the quarterfinals to advance. World number eight ranked Kyle Waddell finished 1–4 and failed to qualify.

As this was the first event of a new Olympic quadrennial, many new teams made their debut including Magnus Ramsfjell, Kim Schwaller, and the three new Italian lineups of Joël Retornaz, Stefano Spiller and Alberto Zisa.

== Teams ==
The teams are listed as follows:

Skip	Third	Second	Lead	Alternate	Locale
Michael Brunner	Enrico Pfister	Romano Keller-Meier	Marcel Käufeler	Marc Pfister	Bern, Switzerland
Orrin Carson	Logan Carson	Archie Hyslop	Charlie Gibb		Dumfries, Scotland
Philipp Hösli (Fourth)	Marco Hösli (Skip)	Simon Gloor	Justin Hausherr		Glarus, Switzerland
Manuel Jermann	Yannick Jermann	Timon Biehle	Jan Tanner		Basel, Switzerland
Jakub Jurkovič	Patrik Kaprálik	Karol Vidlár	Simon Langus		Bratislava, Slovakia
Magnus Ramsfjell	Steffen Walstad	Bendik Ramsfjell	Mathias Brænden		Trondheim, Norway
Joël Retornaz	Stefano Gilli	Andrea Gilli	Alberto Pimpini		Brunico, Italy
Kim Schwaller	Max Winz	Andreas Gerlach	Jan Iseli		Oberwallis, Switzerland
Benoît Schwarz-van Berkel (Fourth)	Yannick Schwaller (Skip)	Sven Michel	Pablo Lachat-Couchepin		Geneva, Switzerland
Stefano Spiller	Amos Mosaner	Sebastiano Arman	Cesare Spiller		Trentino, Italy
Kyle Waddell	Mark Watt	Angus Bryce	Blair Haswell		Hamilton, Scotland
Mattia Giovanella (Fourth)	Alberto Zisa (Skip)	Francesco De Zanna	Francesco Vigliani		Trentino, Italy

== Round robin standings ==
Final Round Robin Standings

Key
Teams to Playoffs

Pool A	W	L	PF	PA	DSC
(Italy) Joël Retornaz	4	1	28	22	18.68
(Norway) Magnus Ramsfjell	4	1	32	17	34.63
(Switzerland) Michael Brunner	3	2	25	27	21.45
(Switzerland) Manuel Jermann	2	3	22	31	48.30
(Switzerland) Kim Schwaller	1	4	28	31	23.50
(Scotland) Kyle Waddell	1	4	27	34	29.50

Pool B	W	L	PF	PA	DSC
(Italy) Stefano Spiller	4	1	27	16	24.43
(Switzerland) Yannick Schwaller	4	1	32	20	25.13
(Switzerland) Marco Hösli	3	2	30	26	36.95
(Scotland) Orrin Carson	3	2	35	17	70.35
(Italy) Alberto Zisa	1	4	18	32	23.28
(Slovakia) Jakub Jurkovič	0	5	12	43	112.48

== Round robin results ==
All draw times listed in Central European Time.

=== Draw 1 ===
Thursday, August 13, 5:00 pm

Sheet 1	1	2	3	4	5	6	7	8	Final
(Switzerland) Kim Schwaller 🔨	2	0	1	0	0	0	2	X	5
(Switzerland) Michael Brunner	0	2	0	1	2	1	0	X	6

Sheet 2	1	2	3	4	5	6	7	8	Final
(Italy) Joël Retornaz 🔨	1	0	3	0	2	0	0	X	6
(Scotland) Kyle Waddell	0	1	0	1	0	1	1	X	4

Sheet 4	1	2	3	4	5	6	7	8	Final
(Norway) Magnus Ramsfjell	0	0	0	1	0	2	X	X	3
(Switzerland) Manuel Jermann 🔨	2	0	3	0	2	0	X	X	7

=== Draw 2 ===
Thursday, August 13, 8:30 pm

Sheet 1	1	2	3	4	5	6	7	8	Final
(Switzerland) Yannick Schwaller 🔨	1	0	2	0	1	0	1	0	5
(Italy) Stefano Spiller	0	1	0	2	0	1	0	3	7

Sheet 2	1	2	3	4	5	6	7	8	Final
(Italy) Alberto Zisa	2	0	1	0	0	X	X	X	3
(Switzerland) Marco Hösli 🔨	0	2	0	4	4	X	X	X	10

Sheet 3	1	2	3	4	5	6	7	8	Final
(Scotland) Orrin Carson	1	0	2	0	4	4	X	X	11
(Slovakia) Jakub Jurkovič 🔨	0	1	0	2	0	0	X	X	3

=== Draw 3 ===
Friday, August 14, 8:00 am

Sheet 1	1	2	3	4	5	6	7	8	Final
(Scotland) Kyle Waddell 🔨	2	0	1	0	0	2	0	X	5
(Switzerland) Manuel Jermann	0	1	0	3	1	0	3	X	8

Sheet 2	1	2	3	4	5	6	7	8	Final
(Switzerland) Michael Brunner	0	0	0	1	0	X	X	X	1
(Norway) Magnus Ramsfjell 🔨	2	1	2	0	2	X	X	X	7

Sheet 3	1	2	3	4	5	6	7	8	9	Final
(Switzerland) Kim Schwaller 🔨	1	0	0	1	0	1	0	3	0	6
(Italy) Joël Retornaz	0	0	1	0	2	0	3	0	1	7

=== Draw 4 ===
Friday, August 14, 11:00 am

Sheet 1	1	2	3	4	5	6	7	8	Final
(Slovakia) Jakub Jurkovič	0	1	0	1	0	0	X	X	2
(Switzerland) Marco Hösli 🔨	3	0	2	0	2	1	X	X	8

Sheet 2	1	2	3	4	5	6	7	8	9	Final
(Switzerland) Yannick Schwaller 🔨	3	0	0	0	1	0	0	0	1	5
(Scotland) Orrin Carson	0	2	0	0	0	1	0	1	0	4

Sheet 4	1	2	3	4	5	6	7	8	Final
(Italy) Stefano Spiller 🔨	0	2	1	0	1	0	1	X	5
(Italy) Alberto Zisa	0	0	0	1	0	1	0	X	2

=== Draw 5 ===
Friday, August 14, 2:30 pm

Sheet 2	1	2	3	4	5	6	7	8	Final
(Switzerland) Kim Schwaller 🔨	2	0	2	0	2	0	1	0	7
(Scotland) Kyle Waddell	0	3	0	1	0	2	0	2	8

Sheet 3	1	2	3	4	5	6	7	8	Final
(Switzerland) Michael Brunner 🔨	0	2	0	1	0	2	5	X	10
(Switzerland) Manuel Jermann	0	0	2	0	0	0	0	X	2

Sheet 4	1	2	3	4	5	6	7	8	Final
(Italy) Joël Retornaz 🔨	0	0	1	0	0	0	X	X	1
(Norway) Magnus Ramsfjell	0	1	0	3	2	2	X	X	8

=== Draw 6 ===
Friday, August 14, 5:30 pm

Sheet 1	1	2	3	4	5	6	7	8	Final
(Scotland) Orrin Carson	2	0	2	0	5	X	X	X	9
(Italy) Alberto Zisa 🔨	0	1	0	1	0	X	X	X	2

Sheet 3	1	2	3	4	5	6	7	8	Final
(Italy) Stefano Spiller 🔨	0	0	2	0	0	0	0	X	2
(Switzerland) Marco Hösli	0	2	0	2	1	0	1	X	6

Sheet 4	1	2	3	4	5	6	7	8	Final
(Switzerland) Yannick Schwaller 🔨	3	0	3	0	1	0	X	X	7
(Slovakia) Jakub Jurkovič	0	1	0	1	0	1	X	X	3

=== Draw 7 ===
Friday, August 14, 8:30 pm

Sheet 1	1	2	3	4	5	6	7	8	Final
(Switzerland) Kim Schwaller 🔨	2	0	1	0	0	0	X	X	3
(Norway) Magnus Ramsfjell	0	1	0	1	1	4	X	X	7

Sheet 2	1	2	3	4	5	6	7	8	Final
(Italy) Joël Retornaz 🔨	0	2	0	0	2	0	2	X	6
(Switzerland) Manuel Jermann	0	0	1	0	0	1	0	X	2

Sheet 4	1	2	3	4	5	6	7	8	Final
(Switzerland) Michael Brunner 🔨	0	2	1	1	0	2	0	0	6
(Scotland) Kyle Waddell	0	0	0	0	2	0	2	1	5

=== Draw 8 ===
Saturday, August 15, 8:00 am

Sheet 2	1	2	3	4	5	6	7	8	Final
(Italy) Stefano Spiller 🔨	2	1	3	0	4	X	X	X	10
(Slovakia) Jakub Jurkovič	0	0	0	1	0	X	X	X	1

Sheet 3	1	2	3	4	5	6	7	8	9	Final
(Switzerland) Yannick Schwaller	0	0	2	0	1	1	0	0	1	5
(Italy) Alberto Zisa 🔨	0	0	0	1	0	0	2	1	0	4

Sheet 4	1	2	3	4	5	6	7	8	Final
(Scotland) Orrin Carson 🔨	3	0	1	0	2	0	3	X	9
(Switzerland) Marco Hösli	0	2	0	1	0	1	0	X	4

=== Draw 9 ===
Saturday, August 15, 11:00 am

Sheet 1	1	2	3	4	5	6	7	8	Final
(Switzerland) Michael Brunner 🔨	2	0	0	0	0	0	X	X	2
(Italy) Joël Retornaz	0	2	3	0	1	2	X	X	8

Sheet 3	1	2	3	4	5	6	7	8	Final
(Scotland) Kyle Waddell	0	1	0	2	0	0	2	0	5
(Norway) Magnus Ramsfjell 🔨	1	0	3	0	1	1	0	1	7

Sheet 4	1	2	3	4	5	6	7	8	Final
(Switzerland) Kim Schwaller	0	2	0	1	0	2	2	X	7
(Switzerland) Manuel Jermann 🔨	1	0	1	0	1	0	0	X	3

=== Draw 10 ===
Saturday, August 15, 3:00 pm

Sheet 1	1	2	3	4	5	6	7	8	Final
(Slovakia) Jakub Jurkovič 🔨	1	0	0	1	1	0	X	X	3
(Italy) Alberto Zisa	0	2	1	0	0	4	X	X	7

Sheet 2	1	2	3	4	5	6	7	8	Final
(Switzerland) Yannick Schwaller	0	1	3	0	6	X	X	X	10
(Switzerland) Marco Hösli 🔨	1	0	0	1	0	X	X	X	2

Sheet 3	1	2	3	4	5	6	7	8	Final
(Italy) Stefano Spiller	0	0	0	0	1	0	0	2	3
(Scotland) Orrin Carson 🔨	0	0	0	1	0	0	1	0	2

== Playoffs ==
Quarterfinals
4	(Norway) Magnus Ramsfjell	5
5	(Switzerland) Michael Brunner	4
3	(Switzerland) Yannick Schwaller	7
6	(Switzerland) Marco Hösli	3

Semifinals
1	(Italy) Joël Retornaz	7
4	(Norway) Magnus Ramsfjell	2
2	(Italy) Stefano Spiller	6
3	(Switzerland) Yannick Schwaller	9

Final
1	(Italy) Joël Retornaz	3
3	(Switzerland) Yannick Schwaller	8

=== Quarterfinals ===
Saturday, August 15, 7:30 pm

Sheet 1	1	2	3	4	5	6	7	8	Final
(Norway) Magnus Ramsfjell 🔨	1	0	0	1	0	0	0	3	5
(Switzerland) Michael Brunner	0	1	0	0	0	3	0	0	4

Sheet 4	1	2	3	4	5	6	7	8	Final
(Switzerland) Yannick Schwaller 🔨	3	0	0	2	0	1	1	X	7
(Switzerland) Marco Hösli	0	0	2	0	1	0	0	X	3

=== Semifinals ===
Sunday, August 16, 9:00 am

Sheet 2	1	2	3	4	5	6	7	8	Final
(Italy) Joël Retornaz 🔨	0	0	0	2	0	5	X	X	7
(Norway) Magnus Ramsfjell	0	1	0	0	1	0	X	X	2

Sheet 3	1	2	3	4	5	6	7	8	9	Final
(Italy) Stefano Spiller 🔨	0	1	0	2	0	1	0	2	0	6
(Switzerland) Yannick Schwaller	0	0	2	0	1	0	3	0	3	9

=== Final ===
Sunday, August 16, 1:30 pm

Sheet 2	1	2	3	4	5	6	7	8	Final
(Italy) Joël Retornaz 🔨	0	0	2	0	1	0	0	X	3
(Switzerland) Yannick Schwaller	1	1	0	1	0	3	2	X	8
