= 2024 Baden Masters =

World Curling Tour event

- Host city: Baden, Switzerland
- Arena: Curling Club Baden Regio
- Dates: August 15–18
- Winner: (Scotland) Team Mouat
- Curling club: Curl Edinburgh, Edinburgh
- Skip: Bruce Mouat
- Third: Grant Hardie
- Second: Bobby Lammie
- Lead: Hammy McMillan Jr.
- Coach: Michael Goodfellow
- Finalist: (Switzerland) Yannick Schwaller

The 2024 Baden Masters were held from August 15 to 18 at the Curling Club Baden Regio in Baden, Switzerland as part of the World Curling Tour. The event was held in a round-robin format with a purse of 35,000 CHF. It was the first men's event of the 2024–25 World Curling Tour. The event category for the event was 500.

== Teams ==
The teams are listed as follows:

Skip	Third	Second	Lead	Alternate	Locale
Michael Brunner	Anthony Petoud	Romano Meier	Andreas Gerlach		Bern, Switzerland
Cameron Bryce	Duncan Menzies	Luke Carson	Robin McCall		Kelso, Scotland
Jordan Chandler	Landan Rooney	Connor Lawes	Robert Currie	Evan Lilly	Little Current, Ontario, Canada
James Craik	Mark Watt	Angus Bryce	Blair Haswell		Forfar, Scotland
Korey Dropkin	Andrew Stopera	Mark Fenner	Thomas Howell		(United States) Duluth, Minnesota
Niklas Edin	Oskar Eriksson	Rasmus Wranå	Christoffer Sundgren		Karlstad, Sweden
Wouter Gösgens	Laurens Hoekman	Jaap van Dorp	Tobias van den Hurk	Alexander Magan	Zoetermeer, Netherlands
Philipp Hösli (Fourth)	Marco Hösli (Skip)	Simon Gloor	Justin Hausherr		Glarus, Switzerland
Lukas Høstmælingen	Tinius Haslev Nordbye	Magnus Lillebø	Grunde Buraas		Oslo, Norway
Lukáš Klíma	Marek Černovský	Martin Jurík	Lukáš Klípa	Radek Boháč	Prague, Czech Republic
Bruce Mouat	Grant Hardie	Bobby Lammie	Hammy McMillan Jr.		Edinburgh, Scotland
Marc Muskatewitz	Benny Kapp	Felix Messenzehl	Johannes Scheuerl	Mario Trevisiol	Füssen, Germany
Marc Pfister	Christian Haller	Enrico Pfister	Alan Frei		Manila, Philippines
Joël Retornaz	Amos Mosaner	Sebastiano Arman	Mattia Giovanella		Trentino, Italy
Dean Hürlimann (Fourth)	Andrin Schnider (Skip)	Baptiste Défago	Christian Heinimann		Schaffhausen, Switzerland
Benoît Schwarz-van Berkel (Fourth)	Yannick Schwaller (Skip)	Sven Michel	Pablo Lachat		Geneva, Switzerland
Yves Stocker	Kim Schwaller	Felix Eberhard	Tom Winkelhausen		Zug, Switzerland
Sixten Totzek	Joshua Sutor	Jan-Luca Häg	Magnus Sutor		Füssen, Germany
Kyle Waddell	Orrin Carson (Note: Orrin Carson spared for Craig Waddell.)	Mark Taylor	Gavin Barr		Hamilton, Scotland
Ross Whyte	Robin Brydone	Duncan McFadzean	Euan Kyle		Stirling, Scotland

== Round robin standings ==
Final Round Robin Standings

Key
Teams to Playoffs

Pool A	W	L	PF	PA	DSC
(Germany) Marc Muskatewitz	3	1	22	22	8.57
(Italy) Joël Retornaz	3	1	21	19	18.90
(Switzerland) Michael Brunner	3	1	24	17	23.77
(Scotland) James Craik	1	3	20	18	23.83
(Philippines) Marc Pfister	0	4	14	25	105.80

Pool B	W	L	PF	PA	DSC
(Sweden) Niklas Edin	3	1	23	16	32.27
(Switzerland) Marco Hösli	2	2	20	17	13.70
(Scotland) Cameron Bryce	2	2	19	21	16.13
(Canada) Jordan Chandler	2	2	23	24	56.77
(Germany) Sixten Totzek	1	3	17	24	21.70

Pool C	W	L	PF	PA	DSC
(Scotland) Bruce Mouat	4	0	27	11	26.73
(United States) Korey Dropkin	2	2	16	20	16.00
(Scotland) Kyle Waddell	2	2	17	16	27.90
(Czech Republic) Lukáš Klíma	2	2	17	17	58.87
(Switzerland) Andrin Schnider	0	4	11	24	77.60

Pool D	W	L	PF	PA	DSC
(Switzerland) Yannick Schwaller	3	1	29	16	17.73
(Scotland) Ross Whyte	3	1	25	18	19.67
(Norway) Lukas Høstmælingen	2	2	15	23	25.77
(Switzerland) Yves Stocker	2	2	21	24	106.50
(Netherlands) Wouter Gösgens	0	4	20	29	8.50

== Round robin results ==
All draw times listed in Central European Time.

=== Draw 1 ===
Thursday, August 15, 5:00 pm

Sheet 1	1	2	3	4	5	6	7	8	Final
(Canada) Jordan Chandler	0	1	0	0	1	0	3	0	5
(Germany) Sixten Totzek 🔨	2	0	1	2	0	1	0	1	7

Sheet 2	1	2	3	4	5	6	7	8	Final
(Italy) Joël Retornaz 🔨	0	1	1	0	0	1	0	2	5
(Philippines) Marc Pfister	1	0	0	1	0	0	2	0	4

Sheet 3	1	2	3	4	5	6	7	8	Final
(Sweden) Niklas Edin	0	0	0	2	0	1	X	X	3
(Switzerland) Marco Hösli 🔨	0	1	2	0	3	0	X	X	6

Sheet 4	1	2	3	4	5	6	7	8	Final
(Switzerland) Michael Brunner	0	1	1	0	2	1	0	1	6
(Scotland) James Craik 🔨	1	0	0	2	0	0	1	0	4

=== Draw 2 ===
Thursday, August 15, 8:30 pm

Sheet 1	1	2	3	4	5	6	7	8	Final
(Netherlands) Wouter Gösgens	0	1	0	1	0	1	2	0	5
(Scotland) Ross Whyte 🔨	0	0	2	0	2	0	0	3	7

Sheet 2	1	2	3	4	5	6	7	8	Final
(Scotland) Bruce Mouat 🔨	2	0	4	1	2	X	X	X	9
(Scotland) Kyle Waddell	0	1	0	0	0	X	X	X	1

Sheet 3	1	2	3	4	5	6	7	8	Final
(Switzerland) Yannick Schwaller	0	1	0	0	1	1	0	X	3
(Switzerland) Yves Stocker 🔨	2	0	3	1	0	0	2	X	8

Sheet 4	1	2	3	4	5	6	7	8	Final
(Czech Republic) Lukáš Klíma	2	2	2	0	1	X	X	X	7
(United States) Korey Dropkin 🔨	0	0	0	2	0	X	X	X	2

=== Draw 3 ===
Friday, August 16, 8:00 am

Sheet 1	1	2	3	4	5	6	7	8	Final
(Switzerland) Michael Brunner 🔨	2	0	0	1	0	0	1	X	4
(Italy) Joël Retornaz	0	3	1	0	0	2	0	X	6

Sheet 2	1	2	3	4	5	6	7	8	Final
(Scotland) James Craik	0	2	1	0	0	0	2	0	5
(Germany) Marc Muskatewitz 🔨	2	0	0	1	1	1	0	1	6

Sheet 3	1	2	3	4	5	6	7	8	Final
(Germany) Sixten Totzek	0	0	1	0	2	0	0	X	3
(Scotland) Cameron Bryce 🔨	1	2	0	1	0	3	1	X	8

Sheet 4	1	2	3	4	5	6	7	8	Final
(Canada) Jordan Chandler 🔨	0	1	0	0	2	0	0	0	3
(Sweden) Niklas Edin	0	0	2	1	0	1	1	1	6

=== Draw 4 ===
Friday, August 16, 11:00 am

Sheet 1	1	2	3	4	5	6	7	8	Final
(Czech Republic) Lukáš Klíma	1	0	1	0	0	1	X	X	3
(Scotland) Bruce Mouat 🔨	0	1	0	2	1	0	X	X	4

Sheet 2	1	2	3	4	5	6	7	8	Final
(United States) Korey Dropkin	1	1	3	0	1	0	X	X	6
(Switzerland) Andrin Schnider 🔨	0	0	0	1	0	2	X	X	3

Sheet 3	1	2	3	4	5	6	7	8	Final
(Scotland) Ross Whyte 🔨	2	0	2	0	1	1	1	X	7
(Norway) Lukas Høstmælingen	0	2	0	2	0	0	0	X	4

Sheet 4	1	2	3	4	5	6	7	8	Final
(Netherlands) Wouter Gösgens 🔨	1	0	2	0	0	1	0	X	4
(Switzerland) Yannick Schwaller	0	1	0	1	5	0	1	X	8

=== Draw 5 ===
Friday, August 16, 2:30 pm

Sheet 1	1	2	3	4	5	6	7	8	9	Final
(Switzerland) Marco Hösli	1	0	0	1	0	0	0	1	0	3
(Scotland) Cameron Bryce 🔨	0	2	0	0	0	1	0	0	1	4

Sheet 2	1	2	3	4	5	6	7	8	Final
(Sweden) Niklas Edin	0	2	0	1	0	3	0	X	6
(Germany) Sixten Totzek 🔨	2	0	1	0	1	0	1	X	5

Sheet 3	1	2	3	4	5	6	7	8	Final
(Italy) Joël Retornaz	0	0	1	0	1	1	0	1	4
(Scotland) James Craik 🔨	1	0	0	1	0	0	1	0	3

Sheet 4	1	2	3	4	5	6	7	8	Final
(Philippines) Marc Pfister	0	2	0	0	0	0	2	0	4
(Germany) Marc Muskatewitz 🔨	2	0	0	1	0	1	0	1	5

=== Draw 6 ===
Friday, August 16, 5:30 pm

Sheet 1	1	2	3	4	5	6	7	8	Final
(Switzerland) Yves Stocker	0	1	0	2	0	0	0	X	3
(Norway) Lukas Høstmælingen 🔨	0	0	1	0	2	1	1	X	5

Sheet 2	1	2	3	4	5	6	7	8	Final
(Switzerland) Yannick Schwaller 🔨	3	0	1	0	1	1	2	X	8
(Scotland) Ross Whyte	0	1	0	2	0	0	0	X	3

Sheet 3	1	2	3	4	5	6	7	8	Final
(Scotland) Bruce Mouat	0	4	2	0	0	2	X	X	8
(United States) Korey Dropkin 🔨	1	0	0	1	1	0	X	X	3

Sheet 4	1	2	3	4	5	6	7	8	Final
(Scotland) Kyle Waddell 🔨	0	3	0	2	1	X	X	X	6
(Switzerland) Andrin Schnider	0	0	1	0	0	X	X	X	1

=== Draw 7 ===
Friday, August 16, 8:30 pm

Sheet 1	1	2	3	4	5	6	7	8	Final
(Germany) Marc Muskatewitz	1	0	3	0	0	3	0	1	8
(Italy) Joël Retornaz 🔨	0	2	0	1	2	0	1	0	6

Sheet 2	1	2	3	4	5	6	7	8	Final
(Philippines) Marc Pfister	0	1	1	1	0	1	X	X	4
(Switzerland) Michael Brunner 🔨	4	0	0	0	3	0	X	X	7

Sheet 3	1	2	3	4	5	6	7	8	Final
(Switzerland) Marco Hösli 🔨	1	1	0	2	0	0	2	0	6
(Canada) Jordan Chandler	0	0	2	0	1	1	0	4	8

Sheet 4	1	2	3	4	5	6	7	8	Final
(Scotland) Cameron Bryce 🔨	0	0	0	2	0	X	X	X	2
(Sweden) Niklas Edin	0	1	2	0	5	X	X	X	8

=== Draw 8 ===
Saturday, August 17, 8:00 am

Sheet 1	1	2	3	4	5	6	7	8	Final
(Switzerland) Andrin Schnider	0	1	0	0	1	0	2	0	4
(Scotland) Bruce Mouat 🔨	1	0	1	1	0	1	0	2	6

Sheet 2	1	2	3	4	5	6	7	8	Final
(Scotland) Kyle Waddell	6	0	1	1	X	X	X	X	8
(Czech Republic) Lukáš Klíma 🔨	0	1	0	0	X	X	X	X	1

Sheet 3	1	2	3	4	5	6	7	8	9	Final
(Switzerland) Yves Stocker	0	2	0	3	1	0	2	0	1	9
(Netherlands) Wouter Gösgens 🔨	2	0	2	0	0	2	0	2	0	8

Sheet 4	1	2	3	4	5	6	7	8	Final
(Norway) Lukas Høstmælingen	0	0	1	0	0	0	X	X	1
(Switzerland) Yannick Schwaller 🔨	1	1	0	3	2	3	X	X	10

=== Draw 9 ===
Saturday, August 17, 11:00 am

Sheet 1	1	2	3	4	5	6	7	8	Final
(Scotland) James Craik 🔨	2	1	0	1	0	4	X	X	8
(Philippines) Marc Pfister	0	0	1	0	1	0	X	X	2

Sheet 2	1	2	3	4	5	6	7	8	Final
(Scotland) Cameron Bryce 🔨	0	2	0	2	0	0	1	0	5
(Canada) Jordan Chandler	1	0	2	0	1	1	0	2	7

Sheet 3	1	2	3	4	5	6	7	8	Final
(Germany) Marc Muskatewitz 🔨	1	0	0	0	0	2	0	X	3
(Switzerland) Michael Brunner	0	1	0	4	0	0	2	X	7

Sheet 4	1	2	3	4	5	6	7	8	Final
(Germany) Sixten Totzek	0	0	1	0	1	0	0	X	2
(Switzerland) Marco Hösli 🔨	0	1	0	2	0	1	1	X	5

=== Draw 10 ===
Saturday, August 17, 3:00 pm

Sheet 1	1	2	3	4	5	6	7	8	Final
(United States) Korey Dropkin 🔨	0	1	1	1	0	2	0	X	5
(Scotland) Kyle Waddell	0	0	0	0	1	0	1	X	2

Sheet 2	1	2	3	4	5	6	7	8	Final
(Norway) Lukas Høstmælingen	0	0	2	1	0	2	0	X	5
(Netherlands) Wouter Gösgens 🔨	1	0	0	0	1	0	1	X	3

Sheet 3	1	2	3	4	5	6	7	8	Final
(Switzerland) Andrin Schnider	0	1	0	1	0	1	0	X	3
(Czech Republic) Lukáš Klíma 🔨	2	0	1	0	2	0	1	X	6

Sheet 4	1	2	3	4	5	6	7	8	Final
(Scotland) Ross Whyte 🔨	0	0	4	0	4	X	X	X	8
(Switzerland) Yves Stocker	0	0	0	1	0	X	X	X	1

== Playoffs ==
Quarterfinals
1	(Scotland) Bruce Mouat	8
8	(Switzerland) Marco Hösli	3
4	(Italy) Joël Retornaz	3
5	(Scotland) Ross Whyte	5
2	(Germany) Marc Muskatewitz	6
7	(Sweden) Niklas Edin	8
3	(Switzerland) Yannick Schwaller	7
6	(Switzerland) Michael Brunner	4

Semifinals
1	(Scotland) Bruce Mouat	6
5	(Scotland) Ross Whyte	3
7	(Sweden) Niklas Edin	3
3	(Switzerland) Yannick Schwaller	5

Final
1	(Scotland) Bruce Mouat	7
3	(Switzerland) Yannick Schwaller	6

=== Quarterfinals ===
Saturday, August 17, 8:30 pm

Sheet 1	1	2	3	4	5	6	7	8	Final
(Germany) Marc Muskatewitz	0	0	3	0	1	2	0	0	6
(Sweden) Niklas Edin 🔨	1	2	0	1	0	0	2	2	8

Sheet 2	1	2	3	4	5	6	7	8	Final
(Switzerland) Yannick Schwaller	1	0	2	1	2	0	1	X	7
(Switzerland) Michael Brunner 🔨	0	3	0	0	0	1	0	X	4

Sheet 3	1	2	3	4	5	6	7	8	Final
(Italy) Joël Retornaz	0	1	1	0	0	1	0	0	3
(Scotland) Ross Whyte 🔨	2	0	0	2	0	0	0	1	5

Sheet 4	1	2	3	4	5	6	7	8	Final
(Scotland) Bruce Mouat 🔨	2	0	2	1	0	3	X	X	8
(Switzerland) Marco Hösli	0	2	0	0	1	0	X	X	3

=== Semifinals ===
Sunday, August 18, 9:00 am

Sheet 2	1	2	3	4	5	6	7	8	Final
(Scotland) Bruce Mouat 🔨	2	0	0	0	1	1	0	2	6
(Scotland) Ross Whyte	0	1	0	0	0	0	2	0	3

Sheet 3	1	2	3	4	5	6	7	8	Final
(Sweden) Niklas Edin 🔨	0	0	0	2	0	1	0	X	3
(Switzerland) Yannick Schwaller	0	1	1	0	1	0	2	X	5

=== Final ===
Sunday, August 18, 1:30 pm

Sheet 2	1	2	3	4	5	6	7	8	9	Final
(Scotland) Bruce Mouat 🔨	2	0	0	0	2	0	2	0	1	7
(Switzerland) Yannick Schwaller	0	1	1	0	0	3	0	1	0	6
