= 2025 Baden Masters =

World Curling Tour event

- Host city: Baden, Switzerland
- Arena: Curling Club Baden Regio
- Dates: August 14–17
- Winner: (Switzerland) Team Hösli
- Curling club: CC Glarus, Glarus
- Skip: Marco Hösli
- Fourth: Philipp Hösli
- Second: Simon Gloor
- Lead: Justin Hausherr
- Finalist: (Switzerland) Yannick Schwaller

The 2025 Baden Masters was held from August 14 to 17 at the Curling Club Baden Regio in Baden, Switzerland as part of the World Curling Tour. The event was held in a round-robin format with a purse of 35,000 CHF. It was the first men's event of the 2025–26 World Curling Tour. The event category for the event was 500.

== Teams ==
The teams are listed as follows:

Skip	Third	Second	Lead	Alternate	Locale
Michael Brunner	Anthony Petoud	Romano Meier	Andreas Gerlach		Bern, Switzerland
Grunde Buraas	Magnus Nedregotten	Magnus Lillebø	Harald Dæhlin		Lillehammer, Norway
Orrin Carson	Logan Carson	Archie Hyslop	Charlie Gibb		Dumfries, Scotland
Niklas Edin	Oskar Eriksson	Rasmus Wranå	Christoffer Sundgren		Karlstad, Sweden
Wouter Gösgens	Tobias van den Hurk	Jaap van Dorp	Laurens Hoekman	Alexander Magan	Zoetermeer, Netherlands
Philipp Hösli (Fourth)	Marco Hösli (Skip)	Simon Gloor	Justin Hausherr		Glarus, Switzerland
Max Winz (Fourth)	Jan Iseli (Skip)	Sandro Fanchini	Tom Winkelhausen		Solothurn, Switzerland
Lukáš Klíma	Marek Černovský	Martin Jurík	Lukáš Klípa	Radek Boháč	Prague, Czech Republic
Felix Lüthold	Leon Wittich	Livio Ernst	Jonas Feierabend	Timon Biehle	Wildhaus, Switzerland
Bruce Mouat	Grant Hardie	Bobby Lammie	Hammy McMillan Jr.		Edinburgh, Scotland
Marc Muskatewitz	Benjamin Kapp	Felix Messenzehl	Johannes Scheuerl	Mario Trevisiol	Füssen, Germany
Marc Pfister	Christian Haller	Enrico Pfister	Alan Frei	Benjo Delarmente	Manila, Philippines
Steffen Walstad (Note: Steffen Walstad spared for Magnus Ramsfjell.)	Martin Sesaker	Bendik Ramsfjell	Gaute Nepstad		Trondheim, Norway
Joël Retornaz	Amos Mosaner	Sebastiano Arman	Mattia Giovanella		Trentino, Italy
Benoît Schwarz-van Berkel (Fourth)	Yannick Schwaller (Skip)	Sven Michel	Pablo Lachat-Couchepin		Geneva, Switzerland
Stefano Spiller	Stefano Gilli	Andrea Gilli	Cesare Spiller		Bormio, Italy
Yves Stocker	Kim Schwaller	Marco Hefti	Felix Eberhard		Zug, Switzerland
Kyle Waddell	Mark Watt (Note: Alternate Mark Watt played third, replacing Craig Waddell who spared on Team Whyte.)	Angus Bryce	Blair Haswell		Hamilton, Scotland
Ross Whyte (Fourth)	Robin Brydone (Skip) (Note: Robin Brydone skipped Team Whyte.)	Craig Waddell (Note: Craig Waddell spared for Duncan McFadzean.)	Euan Kyle		Stirling, Scotland
Xu Xiaoming	Fei Xueqing	Li Zhichao	Xu Jingtao	Yang Bohao	Beijing, China

== Round robin standings ==
Final Round Robin Standings

Key
Teams to Playoffs

Pool A	W	L	PF	PA	DSC
(Scotland) Bruce Mouat	4	0	28	11	21.37
(China) Xu Xiaoming	3	1	29	16	31.00
(Norway) Team Ramsfjell	2	2	19	21	24.93
(Netherlands) Wouter Gösgens	1	3	16	19	26.17
(Switzerland) Felix Lüthold	0	4	7	32	47.33

Pool B	W	L	PF	PA	DSC
(Italy) Joël Retornaz	3	1	25	15	15.43
(Scotland) Team Whyte	3	1	30	16	19.27
(Switzerland) Yves Stocker	3	1	31	21	41.23
(Czech Republic) Lukáš Klíma	1	3	15	26	53.50
(Philippines) Marc Pfister	0	4	11	34	33.10

Pool C	W	L	PF	PA	DSC
(Switzerland) Yannick Schwaller	4	0	25	15	18.17
(Scotland) Kyle Waddell	2	2	22	19	21.77
(Sweden) Niklas Edin	2	2	20	18	27.07
(Switzerland) Jan Iseli	2	2	20	21	55.03
(Scotland) Orrin Carson	0	4	11	25	32.53

Pool D	W	L	PF	PA	DSC
(Switzerland) Marco Hösli	4	0	22	14	33.60
(Germany) Marc Muskatewitz	3	1	30	17	26.83
(Switzerland) Michael Brunner	2	2	24	23	9.03
(Italy) Stefano Spiller	1	3	19	25	33.07
(Norway) Grunde Buraas	0	4	14	30	20.17

== Round robin results ==
All draw times listed in Central European Time.

=== Draw 1 ===
Thursday, August 14, 5:00 pm

Sheet 1	1	2	3	4	5	6	7	8	Final
(Philippines) Marc Pfister	0	1	0	0	2	X	X	X	3
(Scotland) Team Whyte 🔨	4	0	5	3	0	X	X	X	12

Sheet 2	1	2	3	4	5	6	7	8	Final
(Switzerland) Felix Lüthold	0	1	0	0	0	0	0	X	1
(Norway) Team Ramsfjell 🔨	2	0	1	0	3	0	1	X	7

Sheet 3	1	2	3	4	5	6	7	8	Final
(Switzerland) Yves Stocker 🔨	4	0	2	0	0	0	1	X	7
(Italy) Joël Retornaz	0	3	0	0	2	0	0	X	5

Sheet 4	1	2	3	4	5	6	7	8	Final
(Scotland) Bruce Mouat 🔨	2	0	1	0	3	0	1	X	7
(China) Xu Xiaoming	0	0	0	1	0	1	0	X	2

=== Draw 2 ===
Thursday, August 14, 8:30 pm

Sheet 1	1	2	3	4	5	6	7	8	Final
(Italy) Stefano Spiller 🔨	0	2	1	0	0	0	1	X	4
(Germany) Marc Muskatewitz	2	0	0	0	3	1	0	X	6

Sheet 2	1	2	3	4	5	6	7	8	Final
(Switzerland) Yannick Schwaller 🔨	0	1	0	3	0	1	0	1	6
(Switzerland) Jan Iseli	0	0	1	0	1	0	3	0	5

Sheet 3	1	2	3	4	5	6	7	8	Final
(Switzerland) Marco Hösli	0	0	0	2	0	1	0	2	5
(Switzerland) Michael Brunner 🔨	0	1	0	0	2	0	1	0	4

Sheet 4	1	2	3	4	5	6	7	8	Final
(Sweden) Niklas Edin 🔨	1	1	0	1	1	0	0	0	4
(Scotland) Kyle Waddell	0	0	2	0	0	3	0	1	6

=== Draw 3 ===
Friday, August 15, 8:00 am

Sheet 1	1	2	3	4	5	6	7	8	Final
(Scotland) Bruce Mouat	0	2	0	1	0	3	0	X	6
(Switzerland) Felix Lüthold 🔨	2	0	0	0	1	0	1	X	4

Sheet 2	1	2	3	4	5	6	7	8	Final
(China) Xu Xiaoming 🔨	2	2	0	0	2	1	X	X	7
(Netherlands) Wouter Gösgens	0	0	1	2	0	0	X	X	3

Sheet 3	1	2	3	4	5	6	7	8	Final
(Scotland) Team Whyte 🔨	3	3	0	1	1	X	X	X	8
(Czech Republic) Lukáš Klíma	0	0	2	0	0	X	X	X	2

Sheet 4	1	2	3	4	5	6	7	8	Final
(Philippines) Marc Pfister 🔨	1	2	0	2	0	0	0	0	5
(Switzerland) Yves Stocker	0	0	1	0	1	4	0	4	10

=== Draw 4 ===
Friday, August 15, 11:00 am

Sheet 1	1	2	3	4	5	6	7	8	Final
(Sweden) Niklas Edin 🔨	1	1	0	1	0	2	0	X	5
(Switzerland) Yannick Schwaller	0	0	2	0	1	0	4	X	7

Sheet 2	1	2	3	4	5	6	7	8	Final
(Scotland) Kyle Waddell	1	1	0	1	0	1	0	3	7
(Scotland) Orrin Carson 🔨	0	0	1	0	1	0	1	0	3

Sheet 3	1	2	3	4	5	6	7	8	Final
(Germany) Marc Muskatewitz	1	1	0	3	0	5	X	X	10
(Norway) Grunde Buraas 🔨	0	0	2	0	2	0	X	X	4

Sheet 4	1	2	3	4	5	6	7	8	Final
(Italy) Stefano Spiller	0	0	2	1	1	0	0	1	5
(Switzerland) Marco Hösli 🔨	0	3	0	0	0	2	1	0	6

=== Draw 5 ===
Friday, August 15, 2:30 pm

Sheet 1	1	2	3	4	5	6	7	8	Final
(Italy) Joël Retornaz 🔨	1	0	2	2	0	3	X	X	8
(Czech Republic) Lukáš Klíma	0	1	0	0	1	0	X	X	2

Sheet 2	1	2	3	4	5	6	7	8	9	Final
(Switzerland) Yves Stocker	1	0	0	1	0	1	0	2	0	5
(Scotland) Team Whyte 🔨	0	0	3	0	1	0	1	0	1	6

Sheet 3	1	2	3	4	5	6	7	8	Final
(Switzerland) Felix Lüthold	0	0	0	0	X	X	X	X	0
(China) Xu Xiaoming 🔨	3	2	2	5	X	X	X	X	12

Sheet 4	1	2	3	4	5	6	7	8	Final
(Norway) Team Ramsfjell	0	0	1	0	1	0	1	1	4
(Netherlands) Wouter Gösgens 🔨	1	0	0	1	0	1	0	0	3

=== Draw 6 ===
Friday, August 15, 5:30 pm

Sheet 1	1	2	3	4	5	6	7	8	Final
(Switzerland) Michael Brunner 🔨	0	1	0	3	0	0	2	X	6
(Norway) Grunde Buraas	0	0	2	0	1	1	0	X	4

Sheet 2	1	2	3	4	5	6	7	8	Final
(Switzerland) Marco Hösli 🔨	0	2	0	0	1	0	0	1	4
(Germany) Marc Muskatewitz	0	0	2	0	0	0	1	0	3

Sheet 3	1	2	3	4	5	6	7	8	Final
(Switzerland) Yannick Schwaller 🔨	0	0	1	1	1	0	1	1	5
(Scotland) Kyle Waddell	1	0	0	0	0	2	0	0	3

Sheet 4	1	2	3	4	5	6	7	8	Final
(Switzerland) Jan Iseli	0	1	0	3	0	2	0	X	6
(Scotland) Orrin Carson 🔨	1	0	0	0	1	0	1	X	3

=== Draw 7 ===
Friday, August 15, 8:30 pm

Sheet 1	1	2	3	4	5	6	7	8	Final
(Netherlands) Wouter Gösgens 🔨	0	2	0	2	0	3	X	X	7
(Switzerland) Felix Lüthold	0	0	1	0	1	0	X	X	2

Sheet 2	1	2	3	4	5	6	7	8	Final
(Norway) Team Ramsfjell	0	0	2	0	0	X	X	X	2
(Scotland) Bruce Mouat 🔨	2	2	0	2	3	X	X	X	9

Sheet 3	1	2	3	4	5	6	7	8	Final
(Italy) Joël Retornaz	2	0	1	0	0	2	1	X	6
(Philippines) Marc Pfister 🔨	0	1	0	0	1	0	0	X	2

Sheet 4	1	2	3	4	5	6	7	8	Final
(Czech Republic) Lukáš Klíma 🔨	2	0	2	0	1	0	0	X	5
(Switzerland) Yves Stocker	0	4	0	2	0	1	2	X	9

=== Draw 8 ===
Saturday, August 16, 8:00 am

Sheet 1	1	2	3	4	5	6	7	8	Final
(Scotland) Orrin Carson	0	0	0	2	0	0	X	X	2
(Switzerland) Yannick Schwaller 🔨	2	0	2	0	2	1	X	X	7

Sheet 2	1	2	3	4	5	6	7	8	Final
(Switzerland) Jan Iseli 🔨	1	0	0	0	1	X	X	X	2
(Sweden) Niklas Edin	0	1	3	2	0	X	X	X	6

Sheet 3	1	2	3	4	5	6	7	8	Final
(Switzerland) Michael Brunner 🔨	3	0	1	0	1	0	4	X	9
(Italy) Stefano Spiller	0	1	0	1	0	1	0	X	3

Sheet 4	1	2	3	4	5	6	7	8	Final
(Norway) Grunde Buraas 🔨	0	1	0	1	0	X	X	X	2
(Switzerland) Marco Hösli	2	0	2	0	3	X	X	X	7

=== Draw 9 ===
Saturday, August 16, 11:00 am

Sheet 1	1	2	3	4	5	6	7	8	Final
(China) Xu Xiaoming	1	0	1	0	2	0	4	X	8
(Norway) Team Ramsfjell 🔨	0	1	0	3	0	2	0	X	6

Sheet 2	1	2	3	4	5	6	7	8	Final
(Czech Republic) Lukáš Klíma 🔨	0	0	2	0	0	1	3	X	6
(Philippines) Marc Pfister	0	0	0	0	1	0	0	X	1

Sheet 3	1	2	3	4	5	6	7	8	Final
(Netherlands) Wouter Gösgens	0	2	1	0	0	0	0	X	3
(Scotland) Bruce Mouat 🔨	1	0	0	1	1	1	2	X	6

Sheet 4	1	2	3	4	5	6	7	8	Final
(Scotland) Team Whyte	0	0	0	2	0	2	0	X	4
(Italy) Joël Retornaz 🔨	0	2	2	0	1	0	1	X	6

=== Draw 10 ===
Saturday, August 16, 3:00 pm

Sheet 1	1	2	3	4	5	6	7	8	Final
(Scotland) Kyle Waddell 🔨	2	0	2	0	1	0	1	0	6
(Switzerland) Jan Iseli	0	2	0	2	0	2	0	1	7

Sheet 2	1	2	3	4	5	6	7	8	Final
(Norway) Grunde Buraas 🔨	1	0	0	2	0	0	1	X	4
(Italy) Stefano Spiller	0	0	3	0	3	1	0	X	7

Sheet 3	1	2	3	4	5	6	7	8	Final
(Scotland) Orrin Carson	0	0	0	2	1	0	0	X	3
(Sweden) Niklas Edin 🔨	1	0	1	0	0	2	1	X	5

Sheet 4	1	2	3	4	5	6	7	8	Final
(Germany) Marc Muskatewitz 🔨	2	0	1	0	2	0	6	X	11
(Switzerland) Michael Brunner	0	2	0	2	0	1	0	X	5

== Playoffs ==
Quarterfinals
1	(Switzerland) Yannick Schwaller	8
8	(Switzerland) Yves Stocker	4
4	(Italy) Joël Retornaz	9
5	(Scotland) Team Whyte	6
2	(Scotland) Bruce Mouat	5
7	(China) Xu Xiaoming	4
3	(Switzerland) Marco Hösli	8
6	(Germany) Marc Muskatewitz	1

Semifinals
1	(Switzerland) Yannick Schwaller	6
4	(Italy) Joël Retornaz	5
2	(Scotland) Bruce Mouat	0
3	(Switzerland) Marco Hösli	8

Final
1	(Switzerland) Yannick Schwaller	3
3	(Switzerland) Marco Hösli	5

=== Quarterfinals ===
Saturday, August 16, 8:30 pm

Sheet 1	1	2	3	4	5	6	7	8	Final
(Switzerland) Marco Hösli 🔨	2	0	3	1	2	X	X	X	8
(Germany) Marc Muskatewitz	0	1	0	0	0	X	X	X	1

Sheet 2	1	2	3	4	5	6	7	8	Final
(Italy) Joël Retornaz	2	1	1	0	0	2	1	2	9
(Scotland) Team Whyte 🔨	0	0	0	3	3	0	0	0	6

Sheet 3	1	2	3	4	5	6	7	8	Final
(Switzerland) Yannick Schwaller 🔨	2	0	2	0	2	0	2	X	8
(Switzerland) Yves Stocker	0	2	0	2	0	0	0	X	4

Sheet 4	1	2	3	4	5	6	7	8	Final
(Scotland) Bruce Mouat 🔨	1	0	0	3	1	0	0	X	5
(China) Xu Xiaoming	0	2	0	0	0	0	2	X	4

=== Semifinals ===
Sunday, August 17, 9:00 am

Sheet 2	1	2	3	4	5	6	7	8	Final
(Scotland) Bruce Mouat 🔨	0	0	0	0	0	X	X	X	0
(Switzerland) Marco Hösli	0	2	1	2	3	X	X	X	8

Sheet 3	1	2	3	4	5	6	7	8	Final
(Switzerland) Yannick Schwaller 🔨	0	2	0	2	0	2	0	X	6
(Italy) Joël Retornaz	1	0	1	0	1	0	2	X	5

=== Final ===
Sunday, August 17, 1:30 pm

Sheet 2	1	2	3	4	5	6	7	8	Final
(Switzerland) Yannick Schwaller	0	0	2	0	0	0	1	0	3
(Switzerland) Marco Hösli 🔨	0	2	0	0	1	0	0	2	5
