= 2025 Players' Championship =

Grand Slam of Curling event

2025 AMJ Players' Championship
- Host city: Toronto, Ontario
- Arena: Mattamy Athletic Centre
- Dates: April 8–13
- Men's winner: (Scotland) Team Mouat
- Curling club: Curl Edinburgh, Edinburgh
- Skip: Bruce Mouat
- Third: Grant Hardie
- Second: Bobby Lammie
- Lead: Hammy McMillan Jr.
- Coach: Michael Goodfellow
- Finalist: (Switzerland) Yannick Schwaller
- Women's winner: (Switzerland) Team Tirinzoni
- Curling club: CC Aarau, Aarau
- Skip: Silvana Tirinzoni
- Fourth: Alina Pätz
- Second: Carole Howald
- Lead: Selina Witschonke
- Coach: Pierre Charette
- Finalist: (Ontario) Rachel Homan

The 2025 AMJ Players' Championship was held from April 8 to 13 at the Mattamy Athletic Centre in Toronto, Ontario. It was the fifth and final Grand Slam event of the 2024–25 curling season.

For the first time in the history of the event, the finals for both the men's and women's were rematches of their respective 2025 World Championships. In the men's event, World Champion Bruce Mouat and his Scottish rink took on Yannick Schwaller from Switzerland, while World women's champion Rachel Homan of Canada faced Silvana Tirinzoni and her team from Switzerland.

In the women's final, Tirinzoni took her revenge against Homan, beating the Ottawa-based rink 5–4, winning her fifth career Slam title in the process. In the game, Tirinzoni got on the board first in the third when they were forced to a single after last-thrower Alina Pätz over-threw a difficult raise attempt to get a second point. Pätz made a perfect freeze in the fourth, which Homan tried to dislodge on an angle-raise of her own, but missed to give up the steal of one. In the fifth, Homan was facing four on her last, a hit which she made to score a single, to go down 2–1. Pätz drew to the eight-foot on her last in the sixth to score two, which was confirmed after a measurement. Homan drew for three in the seventh to tie the game going into the last end. On her last Pätz faced two staggered Homan stones, but was able to take them both out and stick to win the game. It was Tirinzoni's first win over Homan in the season.

In the men's final, Team Mouat beat Team Schwaller 6–5, and became the first team to win four slams in a single season. It was also their 10th career Slam title. In the match, Schwaller was forced to a single in the first after Mouat bailed out his team by making two double takeouts. Schwaller took a 2–0 lead in the second after Mouat came up short on his draw attempt. Mouat tied the game in the fourth after making a draw for two. Mouat forced Schwaller to a single in the fifth when Schwaller's last rock thrower Benoît Schwarz-van Berkel made a tap against three Scottish counters. In the sixth, Mouat made a tap for two, which was confirmed by a measurement, with his second stone barely biting the rings. Schwarz-van Berkel missed a double takeout in the seventh, giving up a steal of one to go down 5–3 heading into the last end. In the eighth, Team Schwaller had a chance for three and the win, but Mouat made a double on his last, foricing Schwarz-van Berkel to make a tap for two to send the game into an extra frame. In the extra, Mouat came up short on a draw to the button attempt on his first, but was successful on his last, making a raise takeout to score the winning point.

== Battle of the Sexes ==
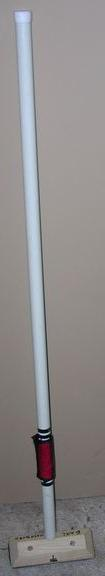
The once-popular Brownie curling broom. Team Mouat will be forced to use one twice in the Battle of the Sexes game.

On April 7, a day prior to the event beginning, the world number one ranked women's team, Rachel Homan and the number one men's team, Bruce Mouat (who both won their respective World Curling Championships in 2025) played in the "Rio Mare Battle of the Sexes" Skins game. The match featured celebrity coaches (Matt Bonner, John Cullen and Team Isabella Wranå), guest appearances and unique scoring rules. It was the first time a game has been held prior to the start of a Slam with both teams raising money for their charity of choice. The first six ends were worth $1,000 with the final two ends worth $3,000. Homan's winnings went towards the Sandra Schmirler Foundation, and Mouat's to Charlie Boy's Cancer Fundraiser for a friend who is battling stage four skin cancer. To equalize the playing field, the Mouat rink were required to use 'soft foam' brush heads, and Team Homan were allowed to force Team Mouat to use Brownie Brooms twice in the game (one in the first half, once in the second).

Scoreboard

Monday, April 7, 7:00 pm

Values (CAD)	$1000	$1000	$1000	$1000	$1000	$1000	$3000	$3000		$12,000
Sheet C	1	2	3	4	5	6	7	8	Button	Total
(Ontario) Rachel Homan		X			X	$		X		$2,000
(Scotland) Bruce Mouat 🔨	$		$	$			$		$	$10,000

== Qualification ==
The top 12 ranked men's and women's teams on World Curling's Year-to-Date rankings as of March 11, 2025, qualified for the event. In the event that a team declines their invitation, the next-ranked team on the world team ranking is invited until the field is complete.

=== Men ===
Top Year-to-Date men's teams:

1. (Scotland) Bruce Mouat
2. (Manitoba) Matt Dunstone
3. (Alberta) Brad Jacobs
4. (Switzerland) Yannick Schwaller
5. (Scotland) Ross Whyte
6. (Saskatchewan) Mike McEwen
7. (Newfoundland and Labrador) Brad Gushue
8. (Germany) Marc Muskatewitz
9. (Switzerland) Marco Hösli
10. (Ontario) John Epping
11. (Italy) Joël Retornaz
12. (United States) Korey Dropkin

=== Women ===
Top Year-to-Date women's teams:

1. (Ontario) Rachel Homan
2. (Switzerland) Silvana Tirinzoni
3. (Sweden) Anna Hasselborg
4. (Manitoba) Kerri Einarson
5. (South Korea) Kim Eun-jung
6. (Japan) Satsuki Fujisawa
7. (Japan) Momoha Tabata
8. (Japan) Sayaka Yoshimura
9. (Switzerland) Xenia Schwaller
10. (South Korea) Gim Eun-ji
11. (South Korea) Ha Seung-youn
12. (Sweden) Isabella Wranå

== Men ==
=== Teams ===
The teams are listed as follows:

Skip	Third	Second	Lead	Alternate	Locale
Korey Dropkin	Thomas Howell	Andrew Stopera	Mark Fenner		(United States) Duluth, Minnesota
Matt Dunstone	Colton Lott	E. J. Harnden	Ryan Harnden		Winnipeg, Manitoba
John Epping	Jacob Horgan	Tanner Horgan	Ian McMillan		Sudbury, Ontario
Brad Gushue	Mark Nichols	Brendan Bottcher	Geoff Walker		St. John's, Newfoundland and Labrador
Philipp Hösli (Fourth)	Marco Hösli (Skip)	Simon Gloor	Justin Hausherr		Glarus, Switzerland
Brad Jacobs	Marc Kennedy	Tyler Tardi (Note: Tyler Tardi spared for Brett Gallant.)	Connor Njegovan (Note: Connor Njegovan spared for Ben Hebert.)		Calgary, Alberta
Mike McEwen	Colton Flasch	Kevin Marsh	Dan Marsh		Saskatoon, Saskatchewan
Bruce Mouat	Grant Hardie	Bobby Lammie	Hammy McMillan Jr.		Edinburgh, Scotland
Marc Muskatewitz	Benjamin Kapp	Felix Messenzehl	Johannes Scheuerl	Mario Trevisiol	Füssen, Germany
Joël Retornaz	Amos Mosaner	Sebastiano Arman	Mattia Giovanella		Trentino, Italy
Benoît Schwarz-van Berkel (Fourth)	Yannick Schwaller (Skip)	Sven Michel	Pablo Lachat		Geneva, Switzerland
Ross Whyte	Robin Brydone	Duncan McFadzean	Euan Kyle		Stirling, Scotland

=== Round robin standings ===
Final Round Robin Standings

Key
Teams to Playoffs

Pool A	W	L	PF	PA	SO
(Switzerland) Yannick Schwaller	4	1	29	18	3
(Scotland) Bruce Mouat	4	1	27	21	4
(Scotland) Ross Whyte	2	3	30	19	1
(Germany) Marc Muskatewitz	2	3	27	30	7
(Switzerland) Marco Hösli	2	3	21	27	8
(United States) Korey Dropkin	1	4	15	34	10

Pool B	W	L	PF	PA	SO
(Ontario) John Epping	4	1	33	19	9
(Saskatchewan) Mike McEwen	3	2	32	28	2
(Manitoba) Matt Dunstone	3	2	31	21	5
(Alberta) Brad Jacobs	3	2	18	27	12
(Newfoundland and Labrador) Brad Gushue	1	4	23	30	6
(Italy) Joël Retornaz	1	4	17	29	11

=== Round robin results ===
All draw times are listed in Eastern Time (UTC−04:00).

==== Draw 1 ====
Tuesday, April 8, 11:30 am

Sheet A	1	2	3	4	5	6	7	8	Final
(Alberta) Brad Jacobs	0	0	1	0	0	0	X	X	1
(Ontario) John Epping 🔨	0	1	0	2	1	4	X	X	8

Sheet B	1	2	3	4	5	6	7	8	Final
(Scotland) Ross Whyte 🔨	3	0	2	0	6	X	X	X	11
(United States) Korey Dropkin	0	1	0	0	0	X	X	X	1

==== Draw 2 ====
Tuesday, April 8, 3:00 pm

Sheet A	1	2	3	4	5	6	7	8	Final
(Italy) Joël Retornaz	0	0	2	0	0	0	1	X	3
(Saskatchewan) Mike McEwen 🔨	0	1	0	2	0	3	0	X	6

Sheet B	1	2	3	4	5	6	7	8	Final
(Scotland) Bruce Mouat	0	3	0	1	1	1	0	2	8
(Germany) Marc Muskatewitz 🔨	1	0	3	0	0	0	2	0	6

==== Draw 3 ====
Tuesday, April 8, 6:30 pm

Sheet A	1	2	3	4	5	6	7	8	Final
(Manitoba) Matt Dunstone	0	1	0	0	1	0	1	0	3
(Newfoundland and Labrador) Brad Gushue 🔨	1	0	0	2	0	0	0	1	4

Sheet B	1	2	3	4	5	6	7	8	Final
(Switzerland) Yannick Schwaller	0	3	0	2	1	1	X	X	7
(Switzerland) Marco Hösli 🔨	0	0	1	0	0	0	X	X	1

==== Draw 4 ====
Wednesday, April 9, 8:00 am

Sheet A	1	2	3	4	5	6	7	8	Final
(Scotland) Bruce Mouat 🔨	1	0	1	1	0	0	2	X	5
(United States) Korey Dropkin	0	0	0	0	0	1	0	X	1

Sheet B	1	2	3	4	5	6	7	8	Final
(Ontario) John Epping	0	2	0	2	0	0	2	1	7
(Saskatchewan) Mike McEwen 🔨	2	0	2	0	0	1	0	0	5

==== Draw 5 ====
Wednesday, April 9, 11:30 am

Sheet A	1	2	3	4	5	6	7	8	Final
(Switzerland) Yannick Schwaller 🔨	0	1	0	1	0	1	1	1	5
(Germany) Marc Muskatewitz	0	0	1	0	2	0	0	0	3

Sheet B	1	2	3	4	5	6	7	8	9	Final
(Alberta) Brad Jacobs 🔨	0	0	2	0	0	0	2	0	1	5
(Newfoundland and Labrador) Brad Gushue	0	0	0	1	1	1	0	1	0	4

==== Draw 6 ====
Wednesday, April 9, 3:30 pm

Sheet A	1	2	3	4	5	6	7	8	Final
(Scotland) Ross Whyte	0	0	0	3	0	1	1	0	5
(Switzerland) Marco Hösli 🔨	0	1	1	0	2	0	0	2	6

Sheet B	1	2	3	4	5	6	7	8	Final
(Manitoba) Matt Dunstone 🔨	2	0	1	4	0	X	X	X	7
(Italy) Joël Retornaz	0	1	0	0	1	X	X	X	2

==== Draw 7 ====
Wednesday, April 9, 7:30 pm

Sheet C	1	2	3	4	5	6	7	8	Final
(Ontario) John Epping 🔨	2	0	4	0	1	0	1	X	8
(Newfoundland and Labrador) Brad Gushue	0	2	0	1	0	2	0	X	5

Sheet D	1	2	3	4	5	6	7	8	Final
(Scotland) Bruce Mouat	0	3	0	1	0	2	1	0	7
(Switzerland) Yannick Schwaller 🔨	1	0	2	0	1	0	0	1	5

==== Draw 8 ====
Thursday, April 10, 8:30 am

Sheet C	1	2	3	4	5	6	7	8	Final
(Alberta) Brad Jacobs 🔨	2	0	0	0	2	0	0	1	5
(Italy) Joël Retornaz	0	1	0	1	0	1	1	0	4

Sheet D	1	2	3	4	5	6	7	8	Final
(Scotland) Ross Whyte 🔨	2	0	0	1	0	1	0	0	4
(Germany) Marc Muskatewitz	0	1	1	0	2	0	0	1	5

==== Draw 9 ====
Thursday, April 10, 11:30 am

Sheet C	1	2	3	4	5	6	7	8	Final
(Switzerland) Yannick Schwaller 🔨	2	1	0	3	0	1	0	X	7
(United States) Korey Dropkin	0	0	1	0	1	0	1	X	3

Sheet D	1	2	3	4	5	6	7	8	Final
(Newfoundland and Labrador) Brad Gushue	0	1	0	1	0	1	1	0	4
(Saskatchewan) Mike McEwen 🔨	2	0	2	0	2	0	0	1	7

==== Draw 10 ====
Thursday, April 10, 3:30 pm

Sheet B	1	2	3	4	5	6	7	8	9	Final
(Germany) Marc Muskatewitz 🔨	3	0	1	0	0	2	0	0	1	7
(Switzerland) Marco Hösli	0	1	0	2	1	0	1	1	0	6

Sheet C	1	2	3	4	5	6	7	8	Final
(Scotland) Bruce Mouat	0	0	1	0	0	1	X	X	2
(Scotland) Ross Whyte 🔨	2	1	0	2	1	0	X	X	6

Sheet D	1	2	3	4	5	6	7	8	Final
(Manitoba) Matt Dunstone	1	0	0	2	1	1	1	X	6
(Alberta) Brad Jacobs 🔨	0	1	0	0	0	0	0	X	1

==== Draw 11 ====
Thursday, April 10, 7:30 pm

Sheet D	1	2	3	4	5	6	7	8	Final
(Italy) Joël Retornaz	0	0	0	1	0	0	X	X	1
(Ontario) John Epping 🔨	0	2	0	0	0	3	X	X	5

==== Draw 12 ====
Friday, April 11, 8:00 am

Sheet A	1	2	3	4	5	6	7	8	Final
(Switzerland) Marco Hösli 🔨	1	0	1	0	0	2	1	X	5
(United States) Korey Dropkin	0	2	0	0	1	0	0	X	3

Sheet C	1	2	3	4	5	6	7	8	9	Final
(Manitoba) Matt Dunstone	0	0	3	0	2	0	2	1	0	8
(Saskatchewan) Mike McEwen 🔨	2	2	0	3	0	1	0	0	1	9

==== Draw 13 ====
Friday, April 11, 11:30 am

Sheet C	1	2	3	4	5	6	7	8	9	Final
(Newfoundland and Labrador) Brad Gushue 🔨	0	1	0	3	0	2	0	0	0	6
(Italy) Joël Retornaz	0	0	2	0	1	0	2	1	1	7

Sheet D	1	2	3	4	5	6	7	8	Final
(Switzerland) Yannick Schwaller 🔨	1	0	1	1	0	1	1	0	5
(Scotland) Ross Whyte	0	1	0	0	2	0	0	1	4

==== Draw 14 ====
Friday, April 11, 3:30 pm

Sheet B	1	2	3	4	5	6	7	8	Final
(Alberta) Brad Jacobs	0	0	2	0	0	2	0	2	6
(Saskatchewan) Mike McEwen 🔨	1	1	0	1	1	0	1	0	5

Sheet D	1	2	3	4	5	6	7	8	Final
(Germany) Marc Muskatewitz 🔨	2	0	1	0	2	0	1	0	6
(United States) Korey Dropkin	0	1	0	2	0	2	0	2	7

==== Draw 15 ====
Friday, April 11, 7:30 pm

Sheet B	1	2	3	4	5	6	7	8	Final
(Manitoba) Matt Dunstone 🔨	3	0	0	2	0	0	1	1	7
(Ontario) John Epping	0	3	0	0	2	0	0	0	5

Sheet D	1	2	3	4	5	6	7	8	Final
(Scotland) Bruce Mouat	1	0	1	0	1	0	1	1	5
(Switzerland) Marco Hösli 🔨	0	1	0	1	0	1	0	0	3

=== Playoffs ===
Quarterfinals
4	(Saskatchewan) Mike McEwen	1
5	(Manitoba) Matt Dunstone	6
3	(Ontario) John Epping	6
6	(Alberta) Brad Jacobs	8

Semifinals
1	(Switzerland) Yannick Schwaller	7
5	(Manitoba) Matt Dunstone	5
2	(Scotland) Bruce Mouat	6
6	(Alberta) Brad Jacobs	2

Final
1	(Switzerland) Yannick Schwaller	5
2	(Scotland) Bruce Mouat	6

==== Quarterfinals ====
Saturday, April 12, 3:30 pm

Sheet A	1	2	3	4	5	6	7	8	Final
(Saskatchewan) Mike McEwen 🔨	0	1	0	0	0	X	X	X	1
(Manitoba) Matt Dunstone	2	0	2	1	1	X	X	X	6

Player percentages
(Saskatchewan) Team McEwen		(Manitoba) Team Dunstone	
Dan Marsh	92%	Ryan Harnden	92%
Kevin Marsh	71%	E. J. Harnden	92%
Colton Flasch	81%	Colton Lott	96%
Mike McEwen	57%	Matt Dunstone	93%
Total	76%	Total	93%

Sheet C	1	2	3	4	5	6	7	8	Final
(Ontario) John Epping 🔨	2	0	1	0	1	0	2	0	6
(Alberta) Brad Jacobs	0	2	0	2	0	2	0	2	8

Player percentages
(Ontario) Team Epping		(Alberta) Team Jacobs	
Ian McMillan	89%	Connor Njegovan	77%
Tanner Horgan	92%	Tyler Tardi	75%
Jacob Horgan	80%	Marc Kennedy	75%
John Epping	67%	Brad Jacobs	83%
Total	82%	Total	77%

==== Semifinals ====
Saturday, April 12, 7:30 pm

Sheet A	1	2	3	4	5	6	7	8	Final
(Scotland) Bruce Mouat 🔨	3	0	0	0	1	0	2	X	6
(Alberta) Brad Jacobs	0	1	0	0	0	1	0	X	2

Player percentages
(Scotland) Team Mouat		(Alberta) Team Jacobs	
Hammy McMillan Jr.	96%	Connor Njegovan	98%
Bobby Lammie	96%	Tyler Tardi	96%
Grant Hardie	95%	Marc Kennedy	93%
Bruce Mouat	96%	Brad Jacobs	82%
Total	96%	Total	92%

Sheet B	1	2	3	4	5	6	7	8	Final
(Switzerland) Yannick Schwaller 🔨	2	0	0	0	2	2	0	1	7
(Manitoba) Matt Dunstone	0	3	0	0	0	0	2	0	5

Player percentages
(Switzerland) Team Schwaller		(Manitoba) Team Dunstone	
Pablo Lachat	89%	Ryan Harnden	95%
Sven Michel	77%	E. J. Harnden	84%
Yannick Schwaller	84%	Colton Lott	84%
Benoît Schwarz-van Berkel	86%	Matt Dunstone	69%
Total	84%	Total	83%

==== Final ====
Sunday, April 13, 4:30 pm

Sheet C	1	2	3	4	5	6	7	8	9	Final
(Switzerland) Yannick Schwaller 🔨	1	0	1	0	1	0	0	2	0	5
(Scotland) Bruce Mouat	0	0	0	2	0	2	1	0	1	6

Player percentages
(Switzerland) Team Schwaller		(Scotland) Team Mouat	
Pablo Lachat	81%	Hammy McMillan Jr.	88%
Sven Michel	82%	Bobby Lammie	78%
Yannick Schwaller	81%	Grant Hardie	88%
Benoît Schwarz-van Berkel	78%	Bruce Mouat	85%
Total	80%	Total	84%

== Women ==
=== Teams ===
The teams are listed as follows:

Skip	Third	Second	Lead	Alternate	Locale
Kerri Einarson	Val Sweeting	Karlee Burgess	Krysten Karwacki		Gimli, Manitoba
Satsuki Fujisawa	Chinami Yoshida	Yumi Suzuki	Yurika Yoshida		Kitami, Japan
Gim Eun-ji	Kim Min-ji	Kim Su-ji	Seol Ye-eun	Seol Ye-ji	Uijeongbu, South Korea
Ha Seung-youn	Kim Hye-rin	Yang Tae-i	Park Seo-jin (Note: Alternate Park Seo-jin played lead, replacing Kim Su-jin.)	Kim Su-jin	Chuncheon, South Korea
Anna Hasselborg	Sara McManus	Agnes Knochenhauer	Sofia Mabergs		Sundbyberg, Sweden
Rachel Homan	Tracy Fleury	Emma Miskew	Sarah Wilkes		Ottawa, Ontario
Kim Eun-jung	Kim Kyeong-ae	Kim Cho-hi	Kim Seon-yeong		Gangneung, South Korea
Xenia Schwaller	Selina Gafner	Fabienne Rieder	Selina Rychiger		Zurich, Switzerland
Momoha Tabata (Fourth)	Miku Nihira (Skip)	Sae Yamamoto	Mikoto Nakajima	Ayami Ito	Sapporo, Japan
Alina Pätz (Fourth)	Silvana Tirinzoni (Skip)	Carole Howald	Selina Witschonke		Aarau, Switzerland
Isabella Wranå	Almida de Val	Maria Larsson	Linda Stenlund		Sundbyberg, Sweden
Sayaka Yoshimura	Kaho Onodera	Yuna Kotani	Anna Ohmiya		Sapporo, Japan

=== Round robin standings ===
Final Round Robin Standings

Key
Teams to Playoffs

Pool A	W	L	PF	PA	SO
(South Korea) Kim Eun-jung	4	1	33	18	3
(Ontario) Rachel Homan	4	1	30	22	9
(Japan) Sayaka Yoshimura	3	2	25	20	1
(Sweden) Isabella Wranå	2	3	24	28	8
(Manitoba) Kerri Einarson	2	3	24	26	10
(Switzerland) Xenia Schwaller	0	5	15	37	4

Pool B	W	L	PF	PA	SO
(Switzerland) Silvana Tirinzoni	4	1	35	22	5
(Sweden) Anna Hasselborg	4	1	26	23	6
(South Korea) Ha Seung-youn	3	2	31	30	7
(South Korea) Gim Eun-ji	2	3	26	27	12
(Japan) Satsuki Fujisawa	1	4	22	30	2
(Japan) Team Tabata	1	4	26	34	11

=== Round robin results ===
All draw times are listed in Eastern Time (UTC−04:00).

==== Draw 1 ====
Tuesday, April 8, 11:30 am

Sheet C	1	2	3	4	5	6	7	8	Final
(Japan) Satsuki Fujisawa	0	0	1	2	0	0	1	1	5
(South Korea) Ha Seung-youn 🔨	0	3	0	0	2	2	0	0	7

Sheet D	1	2	3	4	5	6	7	8	Final
(Ontario) Rachel Homan	0	2	0	0	3	0	0	2	7
(Switzerland) Xenia Schwaller 🔨	1	0	0	2	0	2	0	0	5

==== Draw 2 ====
Tuesday, April 8, 3:00 pm

Sheet C	1	2	3	4	5	6	7	8	Final
(Switzerland) Silvana Tirinzoni 🔨	0	1	0	2	0	3	0	3	9
(Japan) Team Tabata	0	0	1	0	2	0	2	0	5

Sheet D	1	2	3	4	5	6	7	8	Final
(Manitoba) Kerri Einarson	1	1	0	0	2	0	1	1	6
(Japan) Sayaka Yoshimura 🔨	0	0	1	1	0	2	0	0	4

==== Draw 3 ====
Tuesday, April 8, 6:30 pm

Sheet C	1	2	3	4	5	6	7	8	9	Final
(Sweden) Anna Hasselborg 🔨	0	2	0	0	0	2	0	0	1	5
(South Korea) Gim Eun-ji	0	0	2	0	1	0	0	1	0	4

Sheet D	1	2	3	4	5	6	7	8	Final
(South Korea) Kim Eun-jung 🔨	2	0	0	4	0	0	0	1	7
(Sweden) Isabella Wranå	0	2	0	0	1	1	1	0	5

==== Draw 4 ====
Wednesday, April 9, 8:00 am

Sheet C	1	2	3	4	5	6	7	8	Final
(Ontario) Rachel Homan	0	0	2	0	2	0	0	X	4
(Japan) Sayaka Yoshimura 🔨	0	4	0	1	0	2	1	X	8

Sheet D	1	2	3	4	5	6	7	8	Final
(Japan) Satsuki Fujisawa 🔨	1	1	0	1	0	2	0	0	5
(Japan) Team Tabata	0	0	2	0	1	0	2	2	7

==== Draw 5 ====
Wednesday, April 9, 11:30 am

Sheet C	1	2	3	4	5	6	7	8	Final
(Switzerland) Xenia Schwaller	1	0	1	0	1	0	X	X	3
(Sweden) Isabella Wranå 🔨	0	5	0	0	0	3	X	X	8

Sheet D	1	2	3	4	5	6	7	8	Final
(Sweden) Anna Hasselborg 🔨	0	2	0	1	0	1	0	2	6
(South Korea) Ha Seung-youn	0	0	1	0	1	0	1	0	3

==== Draw 6 ====
Wednesday, April 9, 3:30 pm

Sheet C	1	2	3	4	5	6	7	8	Final
(Manitoba) Kerri Einarson	0	0	0	1	0	0	1	0	2
(South Korea) Kim Eun-jung 🔨	1	1	0	0	0	2	0	1	5

Sheet D	1	2	3	4	5	6	7	8	Final
(Switzerland) Silvana Tirinzoni 🔨	0	3	0	1	0	0	2	X	6
(South Korea) Gim Eun-ji	0	0	1	0	2	0	0	X	3

==== Draw 7 ====
Wednesday, April 9, 7:30 pm

Sheet A	1	2	3	4	5	6	7	8	Final
(Ontario) Rachel Homan	0	4	2	2	X	X	X	X	8
(Sweden) Isabella Wranå 🔨	1	0	0	0	X	X	X	X	1

Sheet B	1	2	3	4	5	6	7	8	Final
(Japan) Team Tabata	0	2	0	0	2	0	1	X	5
(South Korea) Ha Seung-youn 🔨	2	0	2	1	0	2	0	X	7

==== Draw 8 ====
Thursday, April 10, 8:30 am

Sheet A	1	2	3	4	5	6	7	8	Final
(Manitoba) Kerri Einarson	0	1	0	3	0	4	0	X	8
(Switzerland) Xenia Schwaller 🔨	2	0	1	0	1	0	1	X	5

Sheet B	1	2	3	4	5	6	7	8	9	Final
(Japan) Satsuki Fujisawa	0	1	1	0	2	0	1	0	1	6
(South Korea) Gim Eun-ji 🔨	2	0	0	1	0	1	0	1	0	5

==== Draw 9 ====
Thursday, April 10, 11:30 am

Sheet A	1	2	3	4	5	6	7	8	9	Final
(Sweden) Anna Hasselborg	0	3	0	1	0	1	0	0	1	6
(Japan) Team Tabata 🔨	3	0	0	0	1	0	0	1	0	5

Sheet B	1	2	3	4	5	6	7	8	Final
(Japan) Sayaka Yoshimura 🔨	0	1	0	1	0	0	1	2	5
(Sweden) Isabella Wranå	0	0	1	0	1	1	0	0	3

==== Draw 10 ====
Thursday, April 10, 3:30 pm

Sheet A	1	2	3	4	5	6	7	8	Final
(Switzerland) Silvana Tirinzoni	0	0	1	0	2	0	2	X	5
(Japan) Satsuki Fujisawa 🔨	1	0	0	1	0	1	0	X	3

==== Draw 11 ====
Thursday, April 10, 7:30 pm

Sheet A	1	2	3	4	5	6	7	8	Final
(South Korea) Gim Eun-ji	0	3	0	2	0	1	1	0	7
(South Korea) Ha Seung-youn 🔨	2	0	2	0	1	0	0	1	6

Sheet B	1	2	3	4	5	6	7	8	Final
(Ontario) Rachel Homan 🔨	1	0	1	0	1	1	0	1	5
(Manitoba) Kerri Einarson	0	1	0	1	0	0	1	0	3

Sheet C	1	2	3	4	5	6	7	8	Final
(South Korea) Kim Eun-jung 🔨	1	1	1	0	5	1	X	X	9
(Switzerland) Xenia Schwaller	0	0	0	2	0	0	X	X	2

==== Draw 12 ====
Friday, April 11, 8:00 am

Sheet B	1	2	3	4	5	6	7	8	Final
(Sweden) Anna Hasselborg	0	0	3	0	1	2	0	X	6
(Japan) Satsuki Fujisawa 🔨	0	1	0	1	0	0	1	X	3

Sheet D	1	2	3	4	5	6	7	8	Final
(South Korea) Kim Eun-jung 🔨	2	0	1	1	0	1	2	X	7
(Japan) Sayaka Yoshimura	0	2	0	0	1	0	0	X	3

==== Draw 13 ====
Friday, April 11, 11:30 am

Sheet A	1	2	3	4	5	6	7	8	Final
(Manitoba) Kerri Einarson	0	2	0	1	0	2	0	X	5
(Sweden) Isabella Wranå 🔨	1	0	2	0	3	0	1	X	7

Sheet B	1	2	3	4	5	6	7	8	Final
(Switzerland) Silvana Tirinzoni 🔨	1	0	2	0	4	0	0	0	7
(South Korea) Ha Seung-youn	0	2	0	3	0	1	1	1	8

==== Draw 14 ====
Friday, April 11, 3:30 pm

Sheet A	1	2	3	4	5	6	7	8	Final
(Japan) Sayaka Yoshimura 🔨	0	0	1	1	1	2	X	X	5
(Switzerland) Xenia Schwaller	0	0	0	0	0	0	X	X	0

Sheet C	1	2	3	4	5	6	7	8	Final
(South Korea) Gim Eun-ji	0	1	0	2	2	0	2	X	7
(Japan) Team Tabata 🔨	2	0	1	0	0	1	0	X	4

==== Draw 15 ====
Friday, April 11, 7:30 pm

Sheet A	1	2	3	4	5	6	7	8	Final
(Ontario) Rachel Homan	1	0	2	0	0	2	0	1	6
(South Korea) Kim Eun-jung 🔨	0	2	0	1	1	0	1	0	5

Sheet C	1	2	3	4	5	6	7	8	Final
(Switzerland) Silvana Tirinzoni	0	2	0	3	1	1	1	X	8
(Sweden) Anna Hasselborg 🔨	2	0	1	0	0	0	0	X	3

=== Playoffs ===
Quarterfinals
4	(Ontario) Rachel Homan	6
5	(Japan) Sayaka Yoshimura	4
3	(Sweden) Anna Hasselborg	6
6	(South Korea) Ha Seung-youn	3

Semifinals
1	(South Korea) Kim Eun-jung	3
4	(Ontario) Rachel Homan	9
2	(Switzerland) Silvana Tirinzoni	12
3	(Sweden) Anna Hasselborg	3

Final
4	(Ontario) Rachel Homan	4
2	(Switzerland) Silvana Tirinzoni	5

==== Quarterfinals ====
Saturday, April 12, 11:30 am

Sheet A	1	2	3	4	5	6	7	8	Final
(Sweden) Anna Hasselborg 🔨	0	2	0	1	1	0	2	X	6
(South Korea) Ha Seung-youn	0	0	1	0	0	2	0	X	3

Player percentages
(Sweden) Team Hasselborg		(South Korea) Team Ha	
Sofia Mabergs	84%	— (Note: Team Ha played with three players in the quarterfinals with both Park Seo-jin and Kim Su-jin falling ill.)	
Agnes Knochenhauer	75%	Yang Tae-i	75%
Sara McManus	81%	Kim Hye-rin	75%
Anna Hasselborg	89%	Ha Seung-youn	83%
Total	82%	Total	77%

Sheet B	1	2	3	4	5	6	7	8	Final
(Ontario) Rachel Homan 🔨	1	0	0	0	1	0	2	2	6
(Japan) Sayaka Yoshimura	0	2	0	1	0	1	0	0	4

Player percentages
(Ontario) Team Homan		(Japan) Team Yoshimura	
Sarah Wilkes	89%	Anna Ohmiya	92%
Emma Miskew	69%	Yuna Kotani	81%
Tracy Fleury	83%	Kaho Onodera	83%
Rachel Homan	77%	Sayaka Yoshimura	73%
Total	79%	Total	82%

==== Semifinals ====
Saturday, April 12, 7:30 pm

Sheet C	1	2	3	4	5	6	7	8	Final
(South Korea) Kim Eun-jung	0	0	0	1	0	2	0	X	3
(Ontario) Rachel Homan 🔨	1	1	1	0	3	0	3	X	9

Player percentages
(South Korea) Team Kim		(Ontario) Team Homan	
Kim Seon-yeong	86%	Sarah Wilkes	98%
Kim Cho-hi	86%	Emma Miskew	91%
Kim Kyeong-ae	88%	Tracy Fleury	93%
Kim Eun-jung	66%	Rachel Homan	95%
Total	81%	Total	94%

Sheet D	1	2	3	4	5	6	7	8	Final
(Switzerland) Silvana Tirinzoni	0	2	0	1	0	3	6	X	12
(Sweden) Anna Hasselborg 🔨	1	0	1	0	1	0	0	X	3

Player percentages
(Switzerland) Team Tirinzoni		(Sweden) Team Hasselborg	
Selina Witschonke	86%	Sofia Mabergs	82%
Carole Howald	80%	Agnes Knochenhauer	66%
Silvana Tirinzoni	68%	Sara McManus	75%
Alina Pätz	86%	Anna Hasselborg	48%
Total	80%	Total	68%

==== Final ====
Sunday, April 13, 12:00 pm

Sheet B	1	2	3	4	5	6	7	8	Final
(Ontario) Rachel Homan	0	0	0	0	1	0	3	0	4
(Switzerland) Silvana Tirinzoni 🔨	0	0	1	1	0	2	0	1	5

Player percentages
(Ontario) Team Homan		(Switzerland) Team Tirinzoni	
Sarah Wilkes	91%	Selina Witschonke	92%
Emma Miskew	69%	Carole Howald	78%
Tracy Fleury	78%	Silvana Tirinzoni	88%
Rachel Homan	78%	Alina Pätz	77%
Total	79%	Total	84%
