= Michael Brunner =

Swiss curler (born 1995)

- Curler
- Born: 11 February 1995 (age 31); St. Gallen, Switzerland

Team
- Curling club: CC Bern Zähringer, Bern, SUI

Curling career
- Member Association: Switzerland
- World Championship: 1 (2022)
- European Championship: 1 (2019)
Medal record
Men's curling
Representing Switzerland
European Championships
Silver medal – second place	2019 Helsingborg
Swiss Men's Championship
Gold medal – first place	2020 Thun
Gold medal – first place	2022 Geneva-Thônex
Silver medal – second place	2014 Schaffhausen
Silver medal – second place	2018 Flims
Silver medal – second place	2019 Thun
Silver medal – second place	2021 Arlesheim
Silver medal – second place	2023 Geneva-Thônex
Bronze medal – third place	2017 Flims
Bronze medal – third place	2024 Geneva-Thônex

Michael Brunner (born 11 February 1995 in St. Gallen, Switzerland) is a Swiss curler from Appenzell.

== Teams ==
=== Men's ===
Season	Skip	Third	Second	Lead	Alternate	Coach	Events
2011–12	Michael Brunner	Romano Meier	Remo Herzog	Marcel Käufeler		Brigitte Brunner	SJCC 2012 (bronze)
2012–13	Michael Brunner	Romano Meier	Remo Herzog	Marcel Käufeler		Brigitte Brunner, Beat Brunner	SJCC 2013 (5th)
2013–14	Romano Meier (fourth)	Michael Brunner (skip)	Kyrill Oehninger	Marcel Käufeler	Remo Herzog	Brigitte Brunner	SJCC 2014 (bronze)
2013–14	Sven Michel	Claudio Pätz	Sandro Trolliet	Simon Gempeler	Michael Brunner; Robert Hürlimann	Robert Hürlimann	SMCC 2014 (silver)
2014–15	Michael Brunner	Marc Wagenseil	Remo Herzog	Lars Nielsen	Raymond Krenger	Brigitte Brunner	SJCC 2015 (bronze)
2015–16	Stefan Staehli (fourth)	Michael Brunner	Neal Schwenter	Simon Biedermann (skip)			
2016–17	Michael Brunner	Stefan Staehli	Neal Schwenter	Chahan Karnusian			
2016–17	Marc Pfister	Enrico Pfister	Raphael Märki	Simon Gempeler	Michael Brunner; Hans Blaser	Robert Hürlimann; Christoph Zysset	SMCC 2017 (bronze)
2018–19	Yannick Schwaller	Michael Brunner	Romano Meier	Marcel Käufeler	Simon Gloor (WUG)	Bernhard Werthemann (CWC/2, CWC/final, SMCC), Thomas Lips (CWC/2), Pius Matter (CWC/3, WUG, SMCC)	CWC/2 (6th); CWC/3 (4th); WUG 2019 (4th); SMCC 2019 (silver); CWC/final (5th)
2019–20	Yannick Schwaller	Michael Brunner	Romano Meier	Marcel Käufeler	Lucien Lottenbach	Bernhard Werthemann	ECC 2019 (silver); SMCC 2020 (gold)
2020–21	Yannick Schwaller	Michael Brunner	Romano Meier	Marcel Käufeler			SMCC 2021 (silver)
2021–22	Yannick Schwaller	Michael Brunner	Romano Meier	Marcel Käufeler			SMCC 2022 (gold) , WCC 2022
2022–23	Michael Brunner	Romano Meier	Anthony Petoud	Marcel Käufeler			SMCC 2023 (silver)
2023–24	Michael Brunner	Anthony Petoud	Romano Meier	Andreas Gerlach			SMCC 2024 (bronze)
2024–25	Michael Brunner	Anthony Petoud	Romano Meier	Andreas Gerlach			SMCC 2025 (4th)
2025–26	Michael Brunner	Anthony Petoud	Romano Meier	Andreas Gerlach			SMCC 2026 (5th)

=== Mixed ===
Season	Skip	Third	Second	Lead	Alternate	Coach	Events
2011–12	Michael Brunner	Elena Stern	Romano Meier	Lisa Gisler			WYOG 2012 (gold)
2012–13	Michael Brunner	Corina Mani	Nicolas Stolz	Tanja Berner	Sina Wettstein; Adonia Brunner; Kyrill Oehninger		SMxCC 2013 (9th)
2014–15	Michael Brunner (fourth)	Briar Hürlimann	Yannick Schwaller (skip)	Céline Koller			SMxCC 2015 (gold)
2016–17	Michael Brunner (fourth)	Briar Hürlimann	Yannick Schwaller (skip)	Céline Koller			SMxCC 2017 (gold)
2017–18	Yannick Schwaller	Elena Stern	Michael Brunner	Céline Koller		Sebastian Stock	WMxCC 2017 (21st)
2017–18	Michael Brunner (fourth)	Briar Hürlimann	Yannick Schwaller (skip)	Céline Koller	Raymond Krenger		SMxCC 2018 (silver)

=== Mixed doubles ===
Season	Male	Female	Coach	Events
2011–12	Michael Brunner	Nicole Muskatewitz	Brigitte Brunner	WYOG 2012 (gold)
2015–16	Michael Brunner	Céline Koller		SMDCC 2016 (5th)

== Personal life ==
He started curling in 2001 when he was 6 years old.

== Grand Slam record ==
Key
C	Champion
F	Lost in Final
SF	Lost in Semifinal
QF	Lost in Quarterfinals
R16	Lost in the round of 16
Q	Did not advance to playoffs
T2	Played in Tier 2 event
DNP	Did not participate in event
N/A	Not a Grand Slam event that season

Event	2018–19	2019–20	2020–21	2021–22	2022–23	2023–24	2024–25	2025–26
Masters	Q	Q	N/A	Q	Q	DNP	DNP	T2
Tour Challenge	DNP	Q	N/A	N/A	Q	T2	Q	DNP
The National	Q	Q	N/A	Q	QF	DNP	Q	DNP
Canadian Open	DNP	QF	N/A	N/A	DNP	Q	Q	T2
Players'	DNP	N/A	Q	Q	DNP	DNP	DNP	DNP
Champions Cup	Q	N/A	Q	DNP	DNP	N/A	N/A	N/A
