= 2009 Baden Masters =

- Host city: Baden, Switzerland
- Arena: Curling Center Baden Regio
- Dates: Sept. 11-13
- Winner: (Canada) Brad Gushue
- Curling club: St. John's CC, St. John's, Newfoundland and Labrador
- Finalist: Thomas Ulsrud

The 2009 Baden Masters was the fifth time the Baden Masters curling event was held. It was held from September 11–13, 2009 and was the first even of the 2009-10 World Curling Tour season. Canada's Brad Gushue rink defeated Norway's Thomas Ulsrud rink in the final 6–3.

== Competing Teams ==
- (Switzerland) Alexander Attinger
- (Canada) Mark Dacey
- (Russia) Andrey Drozdov
- (France) Thomas Dufour
- (Sweden) Niklas Edin
- (Canada) Randy Ferbey
- (Canada) Brad Gushue
- (Switzerland) Pascal Hess
- (Germany) Andy Kapp
- (Switzerland) Stefan Karnusian
- (Japan) Yusuke Morozumi
- (Scotland) David Murdoch
- (Switzerland) Toni Müller
- (Switzerland) Claudio Pescia
- (Switzerland) Manuel Ruch
- (Czech Republic) David Sik
- (Czech Republic) Jiri Snitil
- (Switzerland) Ralph Stöckli
- (Norway) Thomas Ulsrud
- (Switzerland) Patrick Vuille

== Playoffs ==
Quarterfinals
(Canada) Gushue	8
(Switzerland) Karnusian	5
(Scotland) Murdoch	5
(Switzerland) Stöckli	3
(Norway) Ulsrud	7
(Switzerland) Müller	6
(Canada) Ferbey	6
(Czech Republic) Snitil	0

Semifinals
(Canada) Gushue	8
(Scotland) Murdoch	2
(Norway) Ulsrud	9
(Canada) Ferbey	4

Finals
(Canada) Gushue	6
(Norway) Ulsrud	3
Third place
(Scotland) Murdoch	2
(Canada) Ferbey	5
