= 2008 Baden Masters =

2009 Baden Masters
- Host city: Baden, Switzerland
- Arena: Curling Center Baden Regio
- Dates: Sept. 5-7
- Winner: (Norway) Thomas Ulsrud
- Curling club: Snarøen CC, Oslo, NOR
- Finalist: (Scotland) David Murdoch

The 2008 Baden Masters was the fourth time the Baden Masters curling event was held. It was held from September 5–7, 2008 and was the first event of the 2008–09 World Curling Tour season.

== Competing teams ==
- (Norway) Tormod Andreassen
- (Russia) Andrey Drozdov
- (Sweden) Niklas Edin
- (Italy) Stefano Ferronato
- (Switzerland) Pascal Hess
- (Switzerland) Michael Höchner
- (Switzerland) Stephan Karnusian
- (Sweden) Anders Kraupp
- (Scotland) David Murdoch
- (Switzerland) Andreas Schwaller
- (Czech Republic) Jiří Snítil
- (Germany) Sebastian Stock
- (Norway) Thomas Ulsrud
- (Switzerland) Bernhard Werthemann
- (Japan) Yusuke Morozumi

== Playoffs ==
Quarterfinals
(Switzerland) Schwaller	7
(Switzerland) Werthemann	5
(Switzerland) Karnusian	7
(Sweden) Edin	3

Semifinals
(Switzerland) Schwaller	3
(Norway) Ulsrud	4
(Switzerland) Karnusian	6
(Scotland) Murdoch	10

Finals
(Norway) Ulsrud	6
(Scotland) Murdoch	3
Third place
(Switzerland) Karnusian	6
(Switzerland) Schwaller	5
