= Håvard Vad Petersson =

Norwegian curler and Olympic medalist

- Curler
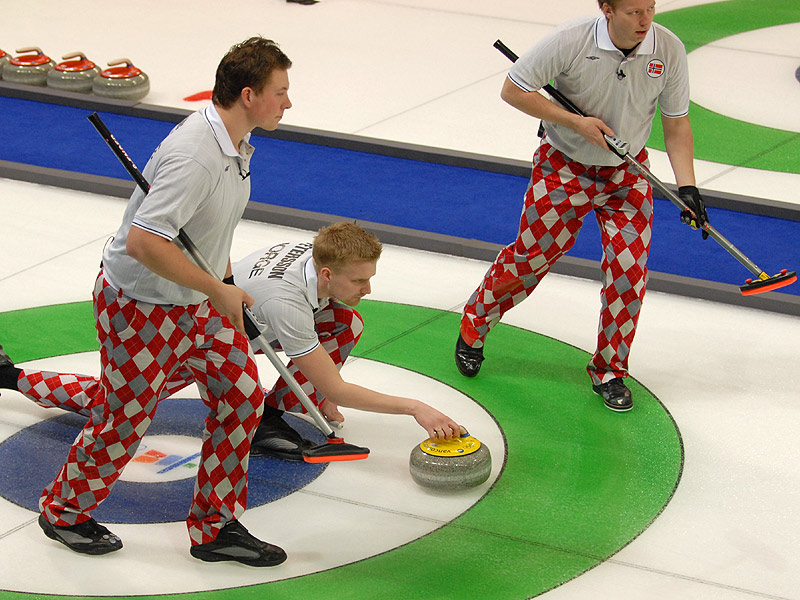
- Håvard Vad Petersson (centre) at the 2010 Winter Olympics.
- Born: 5 January 1984 (age 42); Oslo, Norway

Team
- Curling club: Snarøen CC, Oslo, NOR

Curling career
- World Championship: 9 (2008, 2009, 2010, 2011, 2012, 2013, 2014, 2015, 2016)
- European Championship: 11 (2007, 2008, 2009, 2010, 2011, 2012, 2013, 2014, 2015, 2016, 2017)
- Olympic: 3 (2010, 2014, 2018)
Medal record
Curling
Representing Norway
Winter Olympics
Silver medal – second place	2010 Vancouver
World Championships
Gold medal – first place	2014 Beijing
Silver medal – second place	2010 Cortina d'Ampezzo
Silver medal – second place	2015 Halifax
Bronze medal – third place	2008 Grand Forks
Bronze medal – third place	2009 Moncton
European Championships
Gold medal – first place	2010 Champéry
Gold medal – first place	2011 Moscow
Silver medal – second place	2007 Füssen
Silver medal – second place	2008 Örnsköldsvik
Silver medal – second place	2012 Karlstad
Silver medal – second place	2013 Stavanger
Silver medal – second place	2014 Champéry
Silver medal – second place	2016 Renfrewshire
Bronze medal – third place	2009 Aberdeen
Bronze medal – third place	2015 Esbjerg

Håvard Vad Petersson (born 5 January 1984 in Oslo) is a Norwegian curler from Arendal who was the long time lead for Team Thomas Ulsrud. With the team, he won the silver medal at 2010 Winter Olympics. He is currently the coach of the Yannick Schwaller rink.

== Career ==
At the junior level, Petersson played lead for Team Thomas Løvold and won gold medals at the 2002 and 2003 World Junior Curling Championships "B" tournaments. In 2004, he competed as skip for the first time at the World Junior Curling Championship, finishing in sixth place.

With Team Ulsrud during the 2007–2010 seasons, Petersson won six World Curling Tour events, three European Curling Championship medals (silver in 2007 and 2008; bronze in 2009), three World Curling Championship medals (bronze in 2008 and 2009; silver in 2010), and silver at the 2010 Vancouver Winter Olympics. His shooting accuracy proved to be consistently high in the 80–90 percentiles during the 2009–10 season, which significantly contributed to his team's top round-robin standings at the 2009 European Curling Championship and 2010 World Curling Championship.

Petersson's ability to achieve athletic excellence despite being able to see out of only one eye is often a topic of discussion for sports commentators.

== Personal life ==
Petersson is married to Kristin Olstad and has two children. Before coaching, he was employed as a businessman, and owned Smoothie Xchange/Funky Frozen Yogurt.

== Teams ==
Season	Skip	Third	Second	Lead	Alternate	Events
2001–02	Thomas Løvold	Petter Moe	Christoffer Svae	Håvard Vad Petersson	Christopher Berntsen	2002 WJCCB (Gold)
2002–03	Thomas Løvold	Petter Moe	Christoffer Svae	Håvard Vad Petersson	Bård Rieber-Mohn	2003 WJCCB (Gold); 2003 WJCC
2003–04	Håvard Vad Petersson	Petter Moe	Anders Bjørgum	Øivind A. Grøseth	Hans Tømmervold	2004 WJCC
2004–05	Øivind A. Grøseth	Hans Tømmervold	Håvard Vad Petersson	Anders Bjørgum	Olav Helge Storli	2005 WJCC
2007–08	Thomas Ulsrud	Torger Nergård	Christoffer Svae	Håvard Vad Petersson		2007 Baden Masters; 2007 Lucerne Curling Trophy (Champion)
2007–08	Thomas Ulsrud	Torger Nergård	Christoffer Svae	Håvard Vad Petersson	Thomas Due	2007 ECC (Silver); 2008 WCC (Bronze)
2008–09	Thomas Ulsrud	Torger Nergård	Christoffer Svae	Håvard Vad Petersson		2008 Baden Masters (Champion); 2008 Radisson SAS Oslo Cup (Champion)
2008–09	Thomas Ulsrud	Torger Nergård	Christoffer Svae	Håvard Vad Petersson	Thomas Due	2008 ECC (Silver)
2008–09	Thomas Ulsrud	Torger Nergård	Christoffer Svae	Håvard Vad Petersson	Thomas Løvold	2009 WCC (Bronze)
2009–10	Thomas Ulsrud	Torger Nergård	Christoffer Svae	Håvard Vad Petersson		2009 Baden Masters (Silver); 2009 Swiss Cup Basel (Champion); 2009 Bern Open (Champion); 2009 Lucerne Curling Trophy (Champion)
2009–10	Thomas Ulsrud	Torger Nergård	Christoffer Svae	Håvard Vad Petersson	Thomas Løvold	2009 ECC (Bronze); 2010 OG (Silver)
2009–10	Torger Nergård	Thomas Løvold	Christoffer Svae	Håvard Vad Petersson		2010 WCC (Silver)
2010–11	Thomas Ulsrud	Torger Nergård	Christoffer Svae	Håvard Vad Petersson		2010 Radisson SAS Oslo Cup (Silver)
2010–11	Thomas Ulsrud	Torger Nergård	Christoffer Svae	Håvard Vad Petersson	Markus Snove Hoiberg	2010 ECC (Gold)
2011–12	Thomas Ulsrud	Torger Nergård	Christoffer Svae	Håvard Vad Petersson	Markus Høiberg	2011 ECC, 2012 WCC
2012–13	Thomas Ulsrud	Torger Nergård	Christoffer Svae	Håvard Vad Petersson	Thomas Løvold; Markus Høiberg	2012 ECC, 2013 WCC
2013–14	Thomas Ulsrud	Torger Nergård	Christoffer Svae	Håvard Vad Petersson	Markus Høiberg	2013 ECC, 2014 OG, 2014 WCC
2014–15	Thomas Ulsrud	Torger Nergård	Christoffer Svae	Håvard Vad Petersson		
