= Marco Hösli =

Swiss curler (born 2000)

- Curler
- Born: 15 May 2000 (age 26); Ennenda, Switzerland

Team
- Curling club: CC Glarus
- Skip: Marco Hösli
- Fourth: Philipp Hösli
- Second: Simon Gloor
- Lead: Justin Hausherr

Curling career
- Member Association: Switzerland
- World Championship: 1 (2026)
- European Championship: 1 (2026)
Medal record
Men's curling
Representing Switzerland
World Junior Championships
Silver medal – second place	2019 Liverpool
Silver medal – second place	2020 Krasnoyarsk

Marco Hösli (born 15 May 2000) is a Swiss curler from Ennenda. He is a two-time World Junior silver medallist.

== Career ==
=== Juniors ===
Hösli skipped Team Switzerland, which also included Philipp Hösli, Marco Hefti and Jannis Spiess at the 2019 World Junior Curling Championships. There, he led Switzerland to a 6–3 round robin record. This put them into the playoffs, where they had to play the undefeated Scotland team, skipped by Ross Whyte in the semifinal. Switzerland upset the Scots, putting them into the final against Canada, skipped by Tyler Tardi. Canada beat Switzerland, forcing Hösli and his rink to settle for silver.

The next season, Hösli played for Team Switzerland at the 2020 World Junior Curling Championships, starting the event as the alternate on the team, which was originally skipped by Yves Wagenseil. After the first four games, Hösli took over as skip. The team finished the round robin with a 5–4 record. In the playoffs, the team once again upset Scotland (this time skipped by James Craik) in the semifinal, before losing to Canada (skipped by Jacques Gauthier) in the final.

=== Men's ===
Hösli and his rink of Philipp Hösli, Justin Hausherr and Spiess played in the 2020 Swiss Men's Curling Championship, where they went 1–5. The following season, the team won the Murom Classic World Curling Tour event.

In 2021, Hösli added Marco Hefti as his team's second, replacing Spiess, with Hausherr moving to lead on the team. In the Swiss men's national championships 2021, Hösli and his team won the bronze medal for third place. The team started the 2021–22 curling season by winning two of their first three World Curling Tour events, the Adelboden International and the WCT Tallinn Mens International Challenger. Hösli was named to represent Switzerland at the 2021 Winter Universiade, but the Games were unfortunately cancelled due to COVID-19.

Team Hösli would replace Hefti with Simon Gloor during the 2023–24 curling season, and the team would continue to perform well on the World Curling Tour, qualifying for multiple Grand Slam of Curling events. Team Hösli would win their first national men's title at the 2026 Swiss Men's Curling Championship, qualifying to represent Switzerland at the 2026 World Men's Curling Championship. There, they would finish the round robin with a 9–3 record, qualifying for the playoffs and ultimately finishing in 5th place after losing in the playoffs to the United States' John Shuster.

== Grand Slam record ==
Key
C	Champion
F	Lost in Final
SF	Lost in Semifinal
QF	Lost in Quarterfinals
R16	Lost in the round of 16
Q	Did not advance to playoffs
T2	Played in Tier 2 event
DNP	Did not participate in event
N/A	Not a Grand Slam event that season

Event	2021–22	2022–23	2023–24	2024–25	2025–26	2026–27
Invitational	N/A	DNP	T2	T2	Q	SF
Masters	DNP	Q	DNP	Q	Q	SF
National	DNP	DNP	DNP	Q	Q	Q
Open	N/A	DNP	DNP	Q	Q	
Players'	Q	DNP	DNP	Q	DNP	

== Teams ==
Season	Skip	Third	Second	Lead	Alternate	Events
2018–19	Marco Hösli	Philipp Hösli	Marco Hefti	Jannis Spiess	Yves Stocker (WJCC)	WJCC 2019 (silver)
2019–20	Marco Hösli	Philipp Hösli	Justin Hausherr	Jannis Spiess		
2019–20	Yves Stocker	Yves Wagenseil	Felix Eberhard	Marcel Gertsch	Marco Hösli	WJCC 2020 (silver)
2020–21	Marco Hösli	Philipp Hösli	Marco Hefti	Justin Hausherr		SMCC 2021 (bronze)
2021–22	Marco Hösli	Philipp Hösli	Marco Hefti	Justin Hausherr		SMCC 2022 (silver)
2022–23	Marco Hösli	Philipp Hösli	Marco Hefti	Justin Hausherr		SMCC 2023 (4th)
2023–24	Marco Hösli	Philipp Hösli	Simon Gloor	Justin Hausherr		SMCC 2024 (4th)
2024–25	Philipp Hösli (Fourth)	Marco Hösli (Skip)	Simon Gloor	Justin Hausherr		SMCC 2025 (silver)
2025–26	Philipp Hösli (Fourth)	Marco Hösli (Skip)	Simon Gloor	Justin Hausherr		SMCC 2026 (gold); WMCC 2026 (5th)
2026–27	Philipp Hösli (Fourth)	Marco Hösli (Skip)	Simon Gloor	Justin Hausherr		
