= Pablo Lachat-Couchepin =

Swiss curler (born 2000)

- Curler
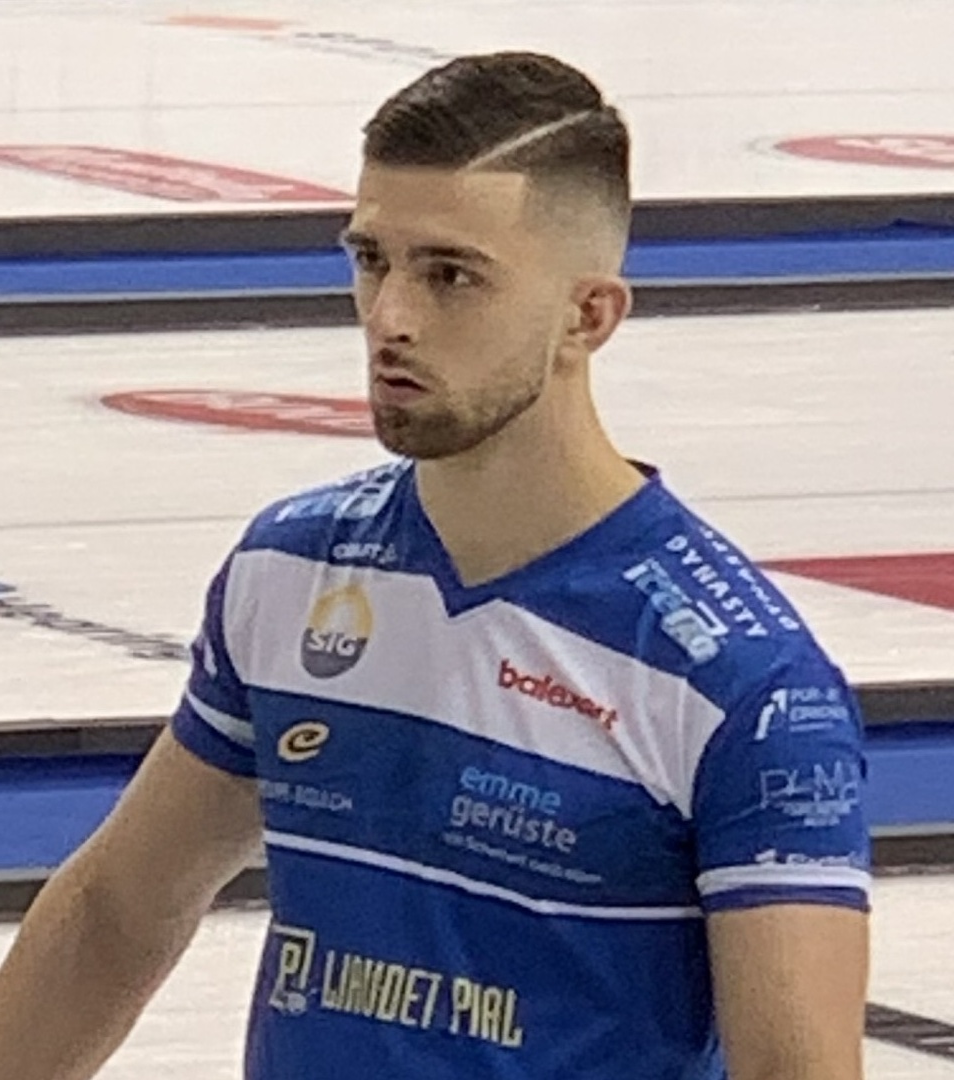
- Born: Pablo Lachat; 20 October 2000 (age 26); Lausanne, Switzerland

Team
- Curling club: CC Lausanne Olympique, Lausanne, SUI
- Skip: Yannick Schwaller
- Fourth: Benoît Schwarz-van Berkel
- Second: Sven Michel
- Lead: Pablo Lachat-Couchepin
- Alternate: Kim Schwaller

Curling career
- Member Association: Switzerland
- World Championship: 4 (2021, 2023, 2024, 2025)
- European Championship: 5 (2021, 2022, 2023, 2024, 2025)
- Olympic: 2 (2022, 2026)
- Grand Slam victories: 2 (2025 Canadian Open, 2026 Invitational)
Medal record
Men's curling
Representing Switzerland
Olympic Games
Bronze medal – third place	2026 Milano Cortina	Team
World Championships
Silver medal – second place	2025 Moose Jaw
Bronze medal – third place	2021 Calgary
Bronze medal – third place	2023 Ottawa
European Championships
Silver medal – second place	2022 Östersund
Silver medal – second place	2025 Lohja
Bronze medal – third place	2023 Aberdeen

Pablo Lachat-Couchepin (born 20 October 2000) is a Swiss curler. He currently plays lead on Team Yannick Schwaller. With Team Schwaller, he won the bronze medal in 2026 Winter Olympics.

== Career ==
=== Juniors ===
Lachat won the Swiss Junior Curling Championships in 2020 with his team of Jan Klossner, Theo Short and Anthony Petoud. This qualified the team for the 2021 World Junior Curling Championships, however, the event was cancelled due to the COVID-19 pandemic.

=== Men's ===
==== Alternate for Team de Cruz (2021–2022) ====
Lachat was the alternate for the Swiss National Men's Curling Team skipped by Peter de Cruz at the 2021 World Men's Curling Championship. At the Worlds, Team Switzerland finished the round robin with a 8–5 record which qualified them for the playoffs as the sixth seed. They then defeated the United States 7–6 in the qualification game before losing 11–3 to Sweden in the semifinal. They were able to defeat RCF (Russia) in the bronze medal game 6–5 to claim the bronze medal. Because the team qualified for the playoffs, they earned Switzerland a berth into the 2022 Winter Olympics.

Lachat was the alternate for the de Cruz rink once again for the 2021–22 season. At the start of the season, Team de Cruz won the 2021 Swiss Olympic Curling Trials, securing their spot as the Swiss representatives for the 2022 Winter Olympics. Next, the team represented Switzerland at the 2021 European Curling Championships where they finished the round robin with a 5–4 record, failing to advance to the playoffs. In February 2022, the team represented Switzerland at the 2022 Winter Olympics in Beijing, China. At the 2022 Olympics, the Swiss would finish in 7th place with a 4–5 record.

==== Team Schwaller (2022–present) ====
Following the 2021–22 season, the top two Swiss rinks, Schwaller and de Cruz, announced that they would be disbanding. A new team was then created consisting of Lachat, Sven Michel, Yannick Schwaller and Benoît Schwarz-van Berkel for the 2022–23 season. Schwaller would skip the team but throw third rocks with Schwarz-van Berkel throwing fourth rocks, Michel playing second, and Lachat at lead. The new Schwaller rink would represent Switzerland at the 2022 European Curling Championships, where they would go 8–1 in the round robin, but lose to Scotland's Bruce Mouat 5–4 in the final, winning the silver medal. Schwaller would go on to represent Switzerland at the 2023 World Men's Curling Championship, where they would win a bronze medal, beating Italy's Joël Retornaz 11–3 in the bronze medal game. Schwaller would again represent Switzerland at the 2023 European Curling Championships, once again winning a bronze medal over Italy's Retornaz, this time by a score of 8–4 in the bronze medal game. At the 2024 World Men's Curling Championship, the Swiss team would finish a disappointing 7th, going 6–6 in round robin play. However, Schwaller would have a strong season on the Grand Slam of Curling tour, finishing in the semifinals of both the 2023 National and 2023 Masters.

Schwaller would again have a strong start to the 2024–25 curling season. At the Grand Slam events, Schwaller would finish in the quarterfinals of the 2024 Tour Challenge and semifinalists at the 2024 Canadian Open. At the 2024 European Curling Championships, the team would finish 4th, losing to Norway's Magnus Ramsfjell in the bronze medal game. The Schwaller rink would return to the 2025 World Men's Curling Championship, where they would go 9–3 in the round robin, but lose in the final to Scotland's Mouat 5–4, finishing in second and winning the silver medal.

== Personal life ==
Before curling full time, Lachat was a law student.

== Teams ==
Season	Skip	Third	Second	Lead	Alternate
2016–17	Florian Mesot (Fourth)	Gaëtan Mancini	Anthony Petoud	Pablo Lachat	Theo Kurz
2017–18	Florian Mesot	Pablo Lachat	Anthony Petoud	Gaëtan Mancini	Theo Kurz
2018–19	Florian Mesot	Pablo Lachat	Anthony Petoud	Gaëtan Mancini	Theo Kurz
2019–20	Anthony Petoud (Fourth)	Jan Klossner (Skip)	Pablo Lachat	Theo Kurz	
2020–21	Anthony Petoud (Fourth)	Jan Klossner (Skip)	Pablo Lachat	Theo Kurz	
2020–21	Benoît Schwarz (Fourth)	Sven Michel	Peter de Cruz (Skip)	Valentin Tanner	Pablo Lachat
2021–22	Anthony Petoud (Fourth)	Noé Traub (Skip)	Pablo Lachat	Theo Kurz	
2021–22	Benoît Schwarz (Fourth)	Sven Michel	Peter de Cruz (Skip)	Valentin Tanner	Pablo Lachat
2022–23	Benoît Schwarz (Fourth)	Yannick Schwaller (Skip)	Sven Michel	Pablo Lachat	
2023–24	Benoît Schwarz-van Berkel (Fourth)	Yannick Schwaller (Skip)	Sven Michel	Pablo Lachat	
2024–25	Benoît Schwarz-van Berkel (Fourth)	Yannick Schwaller (Skip)	Sven Michel	Pablo Lachat-Couchepin	
2025–26	Benoît Schwarz-van Berkel (Fourth)	Yannick Schwaller (Skip)	Sven Michel	Pablo Lachat-Couchepin	
2026–27	Benoît Schwarz-van Berkel (Fourth)	Yannick Schwaller (Skip)	Sven Michel	Pablo Lachat-Couchepin	
