= Raphael Märki =

Swiss curler (born 1992)

- Curler
- Born: 5 June 1992 (age 34); Bern

Team
- Skip: Reto Keller
- Third: Raphael Märki
- Second: Chahan Karnusian
- Lead: Michael Probst

Curling career
- World Championship: 3 (2015, 2016, 2018)

Raphael Märki (born 5 June 1992) is a Swiss curler from Bern. He competed at the 2015 Ford World Men's Curling Championship in Halifax, Nova Scotia, Canada, as lead for the Swiss team, which placed seventh in the tournament.
