= Valentin Tanner =

Swiss curler (born 1992)

- Curler
- Born: 2 October 1992 (age 34); Geneva, Switzerland

Team
- Curling club: CC Genève; Geneva, SUI
- Skip: Peter de Cruz
- Fourth: Benoît Schwarz
- Third: Sven Michel
- Lead: Valentin Tanner
- Alternate: Pablo Lachat

Curling career
- Member Association: Switzerland
- World Championship: 4 (2014, 2017, 2019, 2021)
- European Championship: 5 (2015, 2016, 2017, 2018, 2021)
- Olympic: 2 (2018, 2022)
- Grand Slam victories: 1 (2018 Canadian Open)
Medal record
Men's curling
Representing Switzerland
Olympic Games
Bronze medal – third place	2018 Pyeongchang	Team
World Championships
Bronze medal – third place	2014 Beijing
Bronze medal – third place	2017 Edmonton
Bronze medal – third place	2019 Lethbridge
Bronze medal – third place	2021 Calgary
European Championships
Silver medal – second place	2015 Esbjerg
Bronze medal – third place	2016 Renfrewshire
Bronze medal – third place	2017 St Gallen
World Junior Championships
Gold medal – first place	2010 Flims
Silver medal – second place	2011 Perth

Valentin Igor Fédéric Tanner (born 2 October 1992) is a Swiss curler. He is 2018 Winter Olympics bronze medalist and a four-time world bronze medalist.

== Career ==
Tanner is the long-time lead for Peter de Cruz. The team played in two World Junior Curling Championships, winning gold at the 2010 World Junior Curling Championships (defeating Scotland's Ally Fraser in the final) and a silver at the 2011 World Junior Curling Championships (losing to Sweden's Oskar Eriksson in the final). 2011 was the final year of junior eligibility for de Cruz. Even though Tanner could have played another two years of juniors, he stuck with de Cruz to play in men's events.

On the World Curling Tour, the team has won two events, the 2011 Curling Masters Champéry and the 2012 Challenge Casino de Charlevoix. During the 2012-13 curling season, the team played in three Grand Slam events, the 2012 ROGERS Masters of Curling (lost in a tie-breaker), the 2012 Canadian Open of Curling (1-4) and the National (1-4). The next season they played in one Slam, the 2013 Canadian Open of Curling (3-3).

In 2014, the de Cruz rink won their first Swiss championship, by defeating the Swiss Olympic team of Sven Michel in the final.

Tanner won a bronze medal at the 2018 Winter Olympics as a part of team de Cruz.

== Personal life ==
Tanner currently works as a bartender.
