= Sandro Trolliet =

Swiss curler (born 1988)

- Curler
- Born: 3 August 1988 (age 38)

Team
- Curling club: CC Adelboden, Adelboden

Curling career
- World Championship: 1 (2013)
- European Championship: 3 (2011, 2012, 2013)
- Other appearances: World Juniors: 2 (2006, 2007)
Medal record
Curling
Representing Switzerland
European Championships
Gold medal – first place	2013 Stavanger
World Junior Championships
Bronze medal – third place	2007 Eveleth

Sandro Trolliet (born 3 August 1988) is a Swiss curler.

Trolliet has been a long time team mate of Michel's. Trolliet and Michel played on the Swiss junior team at the 2006 World Junior Curling Championships that was skipped by Christian von Gunten. Trolliet only played three games at the event however, as the team's alternate, Alexander Attinger filled in for him in the rest of the games. The team finished in 8th place. The team made it to the 2007 World Junior Curling Championships, and fared much better, winning the bronze medal.

Trolliet continued to play with Michel out of juniors, with Michel becoming the skip of the team. Trolliet played third on the team until 2011 when he was demoted to second when Claudio Pätz joined the rink. The team played at the 2011 European Curling Championships where they finished 6th and at the 2012 European Curling Championships where they finished 6th again. The team made their first World Championships appearance in 2013.
