= Simon Gempeler =

Swiss curler

- Curler
- Born: 9 May 1986 (age 40); Frutigen, SUI

Team
- Curling club: CC Bern, Bern, SUI
- Skip: Björn Jungen
- Fourth: Marc Pfister
- Third: Tim Jungen
- Lead: Simon Gempeler
- Alternate: Enrico Pfister

Curling career
- Member Association: Switzerland
- World Championship: 3 (2013, 2016, 2018)
- European Championship: 5 (2011, 2012, 2013, 2014, 2018)
- Olympic: 1 (2014)
Medal record
Men's Curling
Representing Switzerland
European Championships
Gold medal – first place	2013 Stavanger
Bronze medal – third place	2014 Champéry

Simon Gempeler (born 9 May 1986) is a Swiss curler. He was born in Frutigen. He won gold medal with the Swiss team at the 2013 European Curling Championships in Stavanger. He competed at the 2013 World Curling Championships, and at the 2014 Winter Olympics in Sochi.
