= Peter de Cruz =

Swiss curler (born 1990)

- Curler
- Born: 4 January 1990 (age 36); London, England

Team
- Curling club: CC Genève; Geneva, SUI

Curling career
- Member Association: Switzerland
- World Championship: 4 (2014, 2017, 2019, 2021)
- European Championship: 5 (2015, 2016, 2017, 2018, 2021)
- Olympic: 2 (2018, 2022)
- Grand Slam victories: 1 (2018 Canadian Open)
Medal record
Men's curling
Representing Switzerland
Olympic Games
Bronze medal – third place	2018 Pyeongchang	Team
World Championships
Bronze medal – third place	2014 Beijing
Bronze medal – third place	2017 Edmonton
Bronze medal – third place	2019 Lethbridge
Bronze medal – third place	2021 Calgary
European Championships
Silver medal – second place	2015 Esbjerg
Bronze medal – third place	2016 Renfrewshire
Bronze medal – third place	2017 St Gallen
World Junior Championships
Gold medal – first place	2010 Flims
Silver medal – second place	2011 Perth

Peter Vincent de Cruz (born 4 January 1990) is a Swiss retired curler. He is an Olympic bronze medalist for Switzerland, having skipped his Swiss rink to a third-place finish at the 2018 Winter Olympics in Pyeongchang. While de Cruz was the skip of his team, he threw second stones.

As a junior, De Cruz skipped the Swiss team at both the 2010 and 2011 World Junior Curling Championships. He won the gold medal in 2010, defeating Scotland, skipped by Ally Fraser. In 2011, he took Switzerland to the finals once again, but this time lost to Sweden, skipped by Oskar Eriksson.

De Cruz has won bronze medals at three World Curling Championship, in 2014, 2017 and 2019. He led Switzerland to a silver medal at the 2015 European Curling Championships and bronze medals at the 2017 and 2018 European Curling Championships.

De Cruz has won eight World Curling Tour events in his career, the 2011 and 2018 Curling Masters Champéry, the 2012 Challenge Casino de Charlevoix, the 2016 Baden Masters, the 2018 Meridian Canadian Open Grand Slam, the 2019 Swiss Cup Basel, the 2019 Schweizer Cup and the 2020 Adelboden International.

== Personal life ==
De Cruz currently resides in Carouge, Canton of Geneva.

== Grand Slam record ==
Key
C	Champion
F	Lost in Final
SF	Lost in Semifinal
QF	Lost in Quarterfinals
R16	Lost in the round of 16
Q	Did not advance to playoffs
T2	Played in Tier 2 event
DNP	Did not participate in event
N/A	Not a Grand Slam event that season

Event	2012–13	2013–14	2014–15	2015–16	2016–17	2017–18	2018–19	2019–20	2020–21	2021–22
Elite 10	N/A	N/A	DNP	DNP	QF	DNP	DNP	N/A	N/A	N/A
Masters	Q	DNP	Q	DNP	Q	QF	DNP	Q	N/A	Q
Tour Challenge	N/A	N/A	N/A	Q	DNP	Q	SF	Q	N/A	N/A
National	Q	DNP	Q	DNP	Q	DNP	Q	QF	N/A	SF
Canadian Open	Q	Q	DNP	DNP	DNP	C	Q	Q	N/A	N/A
Players'	DNP	DNP	DNP	DNP	QF	DNP	SF	N/A	Q	DNP
Champions Cup	N/A	N/A	N/A	Q	QF	DNP	DNP	N/A	Q	DNP
