= Marc Pfister =

Filipino curler (born 1989)

- Curler ♂
- Born: September 26, 1989 (age 37); Sumiswald, Switzerland

Team
- Curling club: CC Bern, Bern, SUI
- Skip: Marc Pfister
- Third: Christian Haller
- Second: Enrico Pfister
- Lead: Brayden Carpenter
- Alternate: Alan Frei
- Mixed doubles partner: Katie Dubberstein

Curling career
- Member Association: Switzerland (2009–2023); Philippines (2023–present)
- World Championship: 3 (2015, 2016, 2018)
- World Mixed Doubles Championship: 1 (2015)
- European Championship: 1 (2014)
- Pan Continental Championship: 1 (2025)
- Other appearances: Asian Winter Games: 1 (2025)
Medal record
Curling
Representing Switzerland
European Championships
Bronze medal – third place	2014 Champéry	Men's
Representing the Philippines
Asian Winter Games
Gold medal – first place	2025 Harbin	Men's

Marc Angelo Otida Pfister (born September 26, 1989) is a Filipino curler. He and his team are the 2025 Asian Winter Games men's curling tournament gold medalists.

Pfister has competed in three World Championships for Switzerland, and won gold for the Philippines in Harbin 2025.

== Curling career ==
=== Mens ===
==== Switzerland (2009–2023) ====
As a junior curler, Pfister played third for Switzerland (skipped by David Bartschiger) at the 2009 World Junior Curling Championships, where they finished sixth.

Pfister competed at the 2015 Ford World Men's Curling Championship in Halifax, Nova Scotia, Canada, as skip for the Swiss national curling team. The Swiss team had a great start at the tournament, but lost their last five games. These last five consecutive losses placed the young Swiss team at 5–6 after the round robin, finishing 7th. Also that season, Pfister and partner Carole Howald competed at the 2015 World Mixed Doubles Curling Championship, placing in 13th overall.

Sven Michel joined the team in 2015 to skip the rink. They would play in three Grand Slams, missing the playoffs in all of them. Pfister returned to the Worlds in 2016, on this team. The team had another disappointing tournament, going 4–7 and finishing 9th. After the season, Pfister took over as the skip of the team with Michel leaving them.

In 2017, Pfister went on a hiatus for cancer treatment.

Pfister skipped the Swiss team again at the 2018 World Men's Curling Championship. He led his team to a 6–6 record, in 7th place. They narrowly missed the playoffs, as they had the same record as the United States, but missed the playoffs by virtue of losing their last round robin game to the Americans who qualified in their stead. That season, Team Pfister won the German Masters which would qualify for them to play in the 2018 Humpty's Champions Cup, Pfister's first Grand Slam event as a skip. There, he went winless, missing the playoffs.

==== Philippines (2023–present) ====
In September 2023, Curling Pilipinas, the national curling organization of the Philippines, announced that Pfister would skip the men's Philippines team in their inaugural international curling appearance at the 2023 Pan Continental Curling Championships, B-Division, scheduled to take place in Kelowna, BC, Canada, from October 29 to November 4, 2023. Pfister, along his brother Enrico, are able to compete for the Philippines, as their mother is from there. In their second season together as a team, the Pfister rink would win the 2024 Pan Continental Curling Championships B-Division, qualifying them to compete in the 2025 Pan Continental Curling Championships A-Division for the upcoming season. Pfister would also skip the Philippines at the 2025 Asian Winter Games, where they would go on to win the gold medal, beating South Korea 5–3 in the final. This was the first medal of any colour for the Philippines in the history of the Asian Winter Games, and the first gold medal at the Asian Winter Games for any Southeast Asian Country.

By virtue of their qualification into the A-Division of the Pan Continental Curling Championships, the Philippines team qualified for the 2025 Pre-Olympic Qualification Event. At the pre-qualification event, the team went undefeated in the round robin with a 6–0 record, winning the event and qualifying for the 2025 Olympic Qualification Event. At the Olympic Qualification Event, they would finish the round robin with a 3–4 record, just missing the playoffs and Olympic qualification. The team would then represent the Philippines at the 2025 Pan Continental Curling Championships, where they would finish 6th after the round robin, losing the deciding game against South Korea in an extra end and just missing out on a spot at the World Championships.

=== Mixed Doubles ===
Pfister competed internationally for the first time in mixed doubles curling when he represented the Philippines at the 2025 Asian Winter Games with Kathleen Dubberstein, the skip of the Philippines national women's team. In the Philippines first appearance at the Asian Winter Games, they finished in fourth place with a 5–3 record, losing to China 6–5 in the bronze medal game.

== Grand Slam record ==
Key
C	Champion
F	Lost in Final
SF	Lost in Semifinal
QF	Lost in Quarterfinals
R16	Lost in the round of 16
Q	Did not advance to playoffs
T2	Played in Tier 2 event
DNP	Did not participate in event
N/A	Not a Grand Slam event that season

Event	2015–16	2016–17	2017–18
Tour Challenge	Q	DNP	DNP
The National	Q	DNP	DNP
Canadian Open	Q	DNP	DNP
Champions Cup	DNP	DNP	Q
