= Christoffer Sundgren =

Swedish curler (born 1989)

- Curler
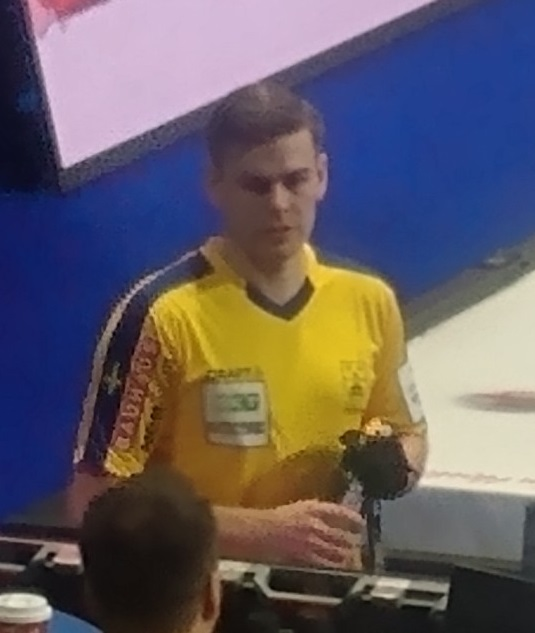
- Sundgren in 2023
- Born: 31 July 1989 (age 37); Sveg, Sweden

Team
- Curling club: Karlstads CK, Karlstad, SWE
- Skip: Oskar Eriksson
- Third: Rasmus Wranå
- Second: Simon Olofsson
- Lead: Christoffer Sundgren

Curling career
- Member Association: Sweden
- World Championship: 12 (2014, 2015, 2016, 2017, 2018, 2019, 2021, 2022, 2023, 2024, 2025, 2026)
- European Championship: 12 (2014, 2015, 2016, 2017, 2018, 2019, 2021, 2022, 2023, 2024, 2025, 2026)
- Olympic: 3 (2018, 2022, 2026)
- Grand Slam victories: 4 (2016 Masters, 2016 Tour Challenge, 2017 Players' Championship, 2022 Tour Challenge)
Medal record
Men's curling
Representing Sweden
Olympic Games
| Gold medal – first place | 2022 Beijing | Team |
| Silver medal – second place | 2018 Pyeongchang | Team |
World Championships
| Gold medal – first place | 2015 Halifax |
| Gold medal – first place | 2018 Las Vegas |
| Gold medal – first place | 2019 Lethbridge |
| Gold medal – first place | 2021 Calgary |
| Gold medal – first place | 2022 Las Vegas |
| Gold medal – first place | 2024 Schaffhausen |
| Gold medal – first place | 2026 Ogden |
| Silver medal – second place | 2014 Beijing |
| Silver medal – second place | 2017 Edmonton |
European Championships
| Gold medal – first place | 2014 Champéry |
| Gold medal – first place | 2015 Esbjerg |
| Gold medal – first place | 2016 Renfrewshire |
| Gold medal – first place | 2017 St Gallen |
| Gold medal – first place | 2019 Helsingborg |
| Gold medal – first place | 2025 Lohja |
| Silver medal – second place | 2018 Tallinn |
| Silver medal – second place | 2021 Lillehammer |
| Silver medal – second place | 2023 Aberdeen |
| Bronze medal – third place | 2026 Ostrava |
World Junior Championships
| Gold medal – first place | 2011 Perth |
Universiade
| Gold medal – first place | 2013 Trentino |

Kjell Tommy Christoffer Sundgren (born 31 July 1989) is a Swedish curler. He was the longtime lead on Team Niklas Edin. He now plays lead on Team Oskar Eriksson. The World Curling Federation's historical records rank Sundgren as one of the most successful curlers of all time, both in the medals that he has received and his lifetime performance in individual championships. He is one of only three curlers in history to have won both the Olympic gold medal and five World Championship gold medals. In 2022, he surpassed the previous record holders for World Men's Curling Championship medals, winning his fifth gold medal, in addition to his and European Men's Curling Championship (5 gold, 2 silver), placing him third of all time on both lists behind his teammates Edin and Oskar Eriksson. He also has reached thirty-five playoffs at Grand Slam of Curling events, including winning three Grand Slam tournaments and the Pinty's Cup as part of Team Niklas Edin, the first non-Canadian men's team to do so. In 2017, Sundgren and his teammates also became the first men's team in history to win four consecutive European Men's Curling Championships. In 2021, he and his teammates became the first men's team in history to win four consecutive World Men's Curling Championships.

== Curling career ==
=== Career beginnings ===
Sundgren played for two curling teams as a junior curler before he entered university. At age 16, he played in Sveg, curling in the third position for a team skipped by Johan Eriksson. The following year, he joined the team based in Lit and led by brothers Kristian Lindström and Alexander Lindström and rounded out by Henrik Leek. In 2008, the team invited Oskar Eriksson to join, who eventually took over the role of skip while playing in the third position. With the newly formed team, Sundgren played lead and competed at the 2009 World Junior Curling Championships, finishing in third place in the standings after the preliminary rounds but in fourth place overall, losing to the US team in the semifinal and the bronze medal game, though they had defeated the US team earlier in the tournament. The team had immediate success on the junior tour and also scored wins in the senior division.

Sundgren began his university studies in Karlstad in the autumn of 2009 and played with various teams during this period. In the 2010–2011 season, he played with three separate teams. For the Elite Series, he skipped the Karlstad team vacated in 2008 by Oskar Eriksson, joining Oskar's brother Markus Eriksson, as well as Marcus Franzén and Henric Jonsson in forming Team Sundgren. He also skipped the Swedish team at the 2011 Winter Universiade, leading the team of Alexander Nordgren, Axel Rosander, and Johan Spiik, though the team ended the tournament in 8th place. Sundgren skipped his own team, Lag Sundgren, for Karlstad in the Swedish Men's Junior Curling Championships, losing an extremely close final to his former teammates Oskar Eriksson, Kristian Lindström, Alexander Lindström, and Henrik Leek. He rejoined them for the 2011 World Junior Curling Championships, winning the gold medal. Though Sundgren was formally an alternate and did not play any games in the round-robin, he played the pivotal winning games in the semifinal and the final when Henrik Leek was under the weather and was essential to the gold medal victory.

=== Men's (2011–present) ===
In 2011, Sundgren rejoined his former team in Lit for much of the season while Alexander Lindström was recovering from surgery, helping them finish in first place in Sweden's national Elite Series tour (though coming in second in the finals). Sundgren played with the team on much the international seniors' tour for the first half of the year and again the end of the season at the European Masters. For the 2012–2013 season, Sundgren was the full-time lead for Team Eriksson when the team relocated to Karlstad, joined also by Markus Eriksson as second, as both Alexander Lindström and Henrik Leek took a step back from curling. With the newly reorganized team, Sundgren and his teammates won the Swiss Cup Basel (2012) and European Masters (2013), as well as the Winter Universiade (2013). In the 2013–14 season, Team Eriksson reached second place at the Swiss Cup Basel, Mercure Perth Masters, and Sweden's Elite Series and competed in Canada on the World Curling Tour, coming in fifth place in three events and reaching their first Grand Slam Quarterfinal at the National. Winning the Swedish Men's Curling Championships that year, the team was also selected to represent Sweden in the 2014 World Men's Curling Championship, as Team Edin had represented Sweden in the European Curling Championships. Though the team lost to Team Norway in the final, they defeated Team Canada, skipped by Kevin Koe twice in the event.

Beginning in the 2014–2015 season, Niklas Edin joined forces with Sundgren, Eriksson, and Kristian Lindström to become Sweden's new national team after Sebastian Kraupp and Fredrik Lindberg took a break from full-time curling. In May 2014, the team decided that Edin would take the skip's position, with Oskar Eriksson playing third, Kristian Lindström playing second and Sundgren holding the lead position. When Lindström underwent surgery in 2016, Rasmus Wranå took over as second. From the start, however, the new Team Edin team immediately saw their increased potential and aimed to become the number one team in the world. Indeed, Team Edin was ranked first at the end of the 2016–17 curling season on both lists and finished in first place on the prize money list in the 2017-18 curling season. The team also reached the finals of the European Curling Championships every year since forming a new team, winning gold in all years but one (2014-2017 and 2019) and winning silver once (2018). The team also secured medals in the finals of the World Curling Championships every year except 2016, winning three gold (2015, 2018, and 2019) and one silver (2017).

As part of Team Edin, Sundgren and his teammates have consistently ranked in the top ten teams in the world since they joined forces due to their performance in Canada and worldwide. The team has reached the playoffs in twenty-one Grand Slam of Curling Events. In the 2016-17 curling season, Team Edin had their most successful year on tour, winning three Slams (the Masters, the Tour Challenge, and the Players’ Championship) and reaching the finals (the Canadian Open) and semifinals (the National and Champions Cup), securing the Pinty's Cup. The Team has also won several other World Curling Tour events, including the European Masters (2014), Swiss Cup Basel (2016, 2018), Baden Masters (2015, 2017), Curling Masters Champery (2016, 2017), and Perth Masters (2018). Team Edin has also won the Swedish Men's Curling Championships six times between 2014 and 2020, skipping the 2017 championships to prepare for the World Championships.

=== Career achievements ===
Sundgren's achievements with Team Eriksson and Team Niklas Edin have earned him both gold and silver Olympic medals, five gold medals and two silver medals at the World Men's Curling Championships, and five gold medals and one silver medal at the European Curling Championships. His record of four gold medals at the World Men's Curling Championships ties him for second place of all-time winners of such medals, alongside players such as Glenn Howard, Randy Ferbey, Scott Pfeifer, and Ernie Richardson, but he is the only curler in this category to also hold the Olympic gold medal. Only his teammates Niklas Edin and Oskar Eriksson have more, with a record five gold World Men's Curling Championship medals and Olympic gold, silver, and bronze. With Edin and Eriksson, Sundgren also became one of the first men's curlers to simultaneously hold the World Curling Championship and European Curling Championship titles in two separate calendar years (2015 and 2019). Sundgren, Edin, and Eriksson are also the first curlers in history on the men's side to win four European Championship gold medals in a row (2014–2017).

== Personal life ==
Sundgren currently resides in Karlstad, Sweden. He graduated from Karlstad University with a Master of Science Degree.

== Grand Slam record ==
Key
| C | Champion |
| F | Lost in Final |
| SF | Lost in Semifinal |
| QF | Lost in Quarterfinals |
| R16 | Lost in the round of 16 |
| Q | Did not advance to playoffs |
| T2 | Played in Tier 2 event |
| DNP | Did not participate in event |
| N/A | Not a Grand Slam event that season |

| Event | 2013–14 | 2014–15 | 2015–16 | 2016–17 | 2017–18 | 2018–19 | 2019–20 | 2020–21 | 2021–22 | 2022–23 | 2023–24 | 2024–25 | 2025–26 | 2026–27 |
|---|---|---|---|---|---|---|---|---|---|---|---|---|---|---|
| Invitational | N/A | N/A | Q | C | SF | Q | QF | N/A | N/A | C | QF | Q | QF | Q |
| Masters | DNP | Q | QF | C | F | SF | Q | N/A | QF | QF | Q | QF | Q | DNP |
| National | QF | DNP | Q | SF | DNP | QF | F | N/A | QF | F | F | Q | Q | SF |
| Open | Q | Q | QF | F | F | SF | Q | N/A | N/A | F | Q | QF | Q | |
| Players' | DNP | Q | QF | C | F | QF | N/A | QF | F | QF | QF | DNP | Q | |
| Champions Cup | N/A | N/A | QF | SF | Q | SF | N/A | QF | SF | SF | N/A | N/A | N/A | N/A |
| Elite 10 | N/A | F | Q | Q | Q | Q | N/A | N/A | N/A | N/A | N/A | N/A | N/A | N/A |

== Teams ==
| Season | Skip | Third | Second | Lead | Alternate | Events |
|---|---|---|---|---|---|---|
| 2005–06 | Johan Eriksson | Christoffer Sundgren | Markus Kurki | Tomas Henriksson | | |
| 2006–07 | Kristian Lindström | Christoffer Sundgren | Henrik Leek | Alexander Lindström | | |
| 2007–08 | Kristian Lindström | Christoffer Sundgren | Henrik Leek | Alexander Lindström | | |
| 2008–09 | Kristian Lindström (fourth) | Oskar Eriksson (skip) | Alexander Lindström | Christoffer Sundgren | Henrik Leek | WJCC |
| 2009–10 | Connie Östlund | Christoffer Sundgren | Mathias Ronnegård | Morgan Fredholm | | |
| 2010–11 | Christoffer Sundgren | Markus Eriksson | Marcus Franzén | Henric Jonsson | Patrik Eriksson | |
| 2011–12 | Kristian Lindström (fourth) | Oskar Eriksson (skip) | Henrik Leek | Alexander Lindström | Christoffer Sundgren | |
| 2012–13 | Oskar Eriksson | Kristian Lindström | Markus Eriksson | Christoffer Sundgren | Henrik Leek | |
| 2013–14 | Oskar Eriksson | Kristian Lindström | Markus Eriksson | Christoffer Sundgren | Gustav Eskilsson | WCC |
| 2014–15 | Niklas Edin | Oskar Eriksson | Kristian Lindström | Christoffer Sundgren | Henrik Leek | ECC, WCC |
| 2015–16 | Niklas Edin | Oskar Eriksson | Kristian Lindström | Christoffer Sundgren | Henrik Leek | ECC, WCC |
| 2016–17 | Niklas Edin | Oskar Eriksson | Rasmus Wranå | Christoffer Sundgren | Henrik Leek | ECC, WCC |
| 2017–18 | Niklas Edin | Oskar Eriksson | Rasmus Wranå | Christoffer Sundgren | Henrik Leek | ECC, OG, WCC |
| 2018–19 | Niklas Edin | Oskar Eriksson | Rasmus Wranå | Christoffer Sundgren | Daniel Magnusson | ECC, WCC |
| 2019–20 | Niklas Edin | Oskar Eriksson | Rasmus Wranå | Christoffer Sundgren | Daniel Magnusson | ECC |
| 2020–21 | Niklas Edin | Oskar Eriksson | Rasmus Wranå | Christoffer Sundgren | Daniel Magnusson | WCC |
| 2021–22 | Niklas Edin | Oskar Eriksson | Rasmus Wranå | Christoffer Sundgren | Daniel Magnusson | ECC, OG |
| 2022–23 | Niklas Edin | Oskar Eriksson | Rasmus Wranå | Christoffer Sundgren | Daniel Magnusson | ECC, WCC |
| 2023–24 | Niklas Edin | Oskar Eriksson | Rasmus Wranå | Christoffer Sundgren | Daniel Magnusson | ECC, WCC |
| 2024–25 | Niklas Edin | Oskar Eriksson | Rasmus Wranå | Christoffer Sundgren | Daniel Magnusson (ECC); Simon Olofsson (WCC) | ECC, WCC |
| 2025–26 | Niklas Edin | Oskar Eriksson | Rasmus Wranå | Christoffer Sundgren | Simon Olofsson | ECC, OG, WCC |
| 2026–27 | Oskar Eriksson | Rasmus Wranå | Simon Olofsson | Christoffer Sundgren | | |
