= Markus Eriksson (curler) =

Swedish male curler and coach

- Curler ♂
- Born: 11 April 1987 (age 39); Karlstad, Sweden

Team
- Curling club: Karlstads CK, Karlstad, Lits CC, Lit

Curling career
- Member Association: Sweden
- World Championship: 1 (2014)
- Other appearances: World Junior Championships: 1 (2008), Winter Universiade: 1 (2013)
Medal record
Curling
World Championships
Silver medal – second place	2014 Beijing
World Junior Championships
Silver medal – second place	2008 Östersund
Winter Universiade
Gold medal – first place	2013 Trentino
Swedish Men's Championship
Gold medal – first place	2013
Gold medal – first place	2014
Bronze medal – third place	2008

Markus Eriksson (born 11 April 1987 in Karlstad, Sweden) is a Swedish curler.

He is a 2014 World Men's silver medallist, 2013 Winter Universiade champion and two-time Swedish Men's champion.

== Teams ==
Season	Skip	Third	Second	Lead	Alternate	Coach	Events
2006–07	Sebastian Kraupp	Fredrik Lindberg	Markus Eriksson	Torbjörn Liljemark			
2007–08	Sebastian Kraupp	Anders Hammarström	Fredrik Lindberg	Markus Eriksson			SMCC 2008 (bronze)
2008	Oskar Eriksson	Henric Jonsson	Markus Franzén	Nils Karlsson	Markus Eriksson	Sören Grahn	WJCC 2008 (silver)
2008–09	Anders Eriksson	Markus Eriksson	Henric Jonsson	Marcus Franzén	Nils Karlsson		SMCC 2009 (5th)
2009–10	Markus Eriksson	Anders Eriksson	Henric Jonsson	Marcus Franzén	Nils Karlsson		SMCC 2010 (9th)
2011–12	Markus Eriksson	Magnus Ekdahl	Emil Ojala	Henric Jonsson			
2012–13	Kristian Lindström (fourth)	Oskar Eriksson (skip)	Markus Eriksson	Christoffer Sundgren			SMCC 2013 (gold)
2013–14	Oskar Eriksson	Kristian Lindström	Markus Eriksson	Christoffer Sundgren	Gustav Eskilsson (WMCC)	Mathias Mabergs	WUG 2013 (gold); SMCC 2014 (gold); WCC 2014 (silver)

== Personal life ==
Markus Eriksson is from a family of curlers: one of his brothers is well-known Swedish curler Oskar Eriksson, player on Team Niklas Edin, Olympic and World champion; another of his brothers is curler Anders Eriksson, 2004 World Junior champion.
