= 2016 Elite 10 =

Grand Slam of Curling event

- Host city: Colwood, British Columbia
- Arena: The Q Centre
- Dates: March 17–20
- Winner: Team Brad Gushue
- Curling club: Bally Haly G&CC
- Skip: Brad Gushue
- Third: Mark Nichols
- Second: Brett Gallant
- Lead: Geoff Walker Newfoundland and Labrador
- Finalist: Reid Carruthers

The 2016 Elite 10 was held from March 17 to 20, 2016 at The Q Centre in Colwood, British Columbia. It was the fourth Grand Slam of Curling event held in the 2015–16 curling season. The tournament was held between ten teams; nine teams were joined by two-time Canadian women's champions Team Homan.

== Teams ==
The teams are listed as follows:

Skip	Third	Second	Lead	Locale
Brendan Bottcher	Tom Appelman	Bradley Thiessen	Karrick Martin	Edmonton, Alberta
Reid Carruthers	Braeden Moskowy	Derek Samagalski	Colin Hodgson	Winnipeg, Manitoba
Niklas Edin	Oskar Eriksson	Kristian Lindström	Christoffer Sundgren	Karlstad, Sweden
John Epping	Mat Camm	Patrick Janssen	Tim March	Toronto, Ontario
Brad Gushue	Mark Nichols	Brett Gallant	Geoff Walker	Newfoundland and Labrador
Rachel Homan	Emma Miskew	Joanne Courtney	Lisa Weagle	Ottawa, Ontario
Kevin Koe	Marc Kennedy	Brent Laing	Ben Hebert	Calgary, Alberta
Steve Laycock	Kirk Muyres	Colton Flasch	Dallan Muyres	Saskatoon, Saskatchewan
Mike McEwen	B. J. Neufeld	Matt Wozniak	Denni Neufeld	Winnipeg, Manitoba
Charley Thomas	Matt Dunstone	Brandon Klassen	D. J. Kidby	Calgary, Alberta

== Round-robin standings ==
Final round-robin standings

Pool A	W	EEW	EEL	L	EW	EL	Pts
(Alberta) Kevin Koe	3	0	0	1	14	4	9
(Manitoba) Mike McEwen	3	0	0	1	9	6	9
(Saskatchewan) Steve Laycock	2	1	0	1	12	8	8
(Sweden) Niklas Edin	1	0	0	3	6	11	3
(Alberta) Brendan Bottcher	0	0	1	3	4	16	1

Pool B	W	EEW	EEL	L	EW	EL	Pts
(Newfoundland and Labrador) Brad Gushue	3	1	0	0	13	4	11
(Manitoba) Reid Carruthers	3	0	1	0	13	8	10
(Ontario) John Epping	2	0	0	2	8	9	6
(Ontario) Rachel Homan	1	0	0	3	5	12	3
(Alberta) Charley Thomas	0	0	0	4	7	13	0

== Round-robin results ==
All draw times are listed in Pacific Standard Time (UTC−8).

=== Draw 1 ===
Thursday, March 17, 11:30 am

Sheet A	1	2	3	4	5	6	7	8	9	Final
(Manitoba) Reid Carruthers					✓	✓				2
(Newfoundland and Labrador) Brad Gushue 🔨			✓	✓					✓	3

Sheet B	1	2	3	4	5	6	7	8	Final
(Sweden) Niklas Edin 🔨		✓						X	1
(Manitoba) Mike McEwen			✓	✓	✓			X	3

Sheet C	1	2	3	4	5	6	7	8	9	Final
(Saskatchewan) Steve Laycock 🔨		✓			✓			✓	✓	4
(Alberta) Brendan Bottcher	✓		✓	✓						3

=== Draw 2 ===
Thursday, March 17, 4:00 pm

Sheet A	1	2	3	4	5	6	7	8	Final
(Alberta) Brendan Bottcher				✓				X	1
(Sweden) Niklas Edin 🔨		✓			✓	✓	✓	X	4

Sheet B	1	2	3	4	5	6	7	8	Final
(Alberta) Kevin Koe			✓			✓			2
(Saskatchewan) Steve Laycock 🔨	✓	✓						✓	3

Sheet C	1	2	3	4	5	6	7	8	Final
(Ontario) John Epping 🔨	✓	✓		✓	✓	X	X	X	4
(Ontario) Rachel Homan						X	X	X	0

=== Draw 3 ===
Thursday, March 17, 7:30 pm

Sheet A	1	2	3	4	5	6	7	8	Final
(Alberta) Kevin Koe 🔨	✓	✓				✓	✓	X	4
(Manitoba) Mike McEwen					✓			X	1

Sheet B	1	2	3	4	5	6	7	8	Final
(Ontario) Rachel Homan 🔨		✓				✓			2
(Manitoba) Reid Carruthers			✓	✓	✓			✓	4

Sheet C	1	2	3	4	5	6	7	8	Final
(Newfoundland and Labrador) Brad Gushue 🔨				✓		✓	✓	X	3
(Alberta) Charley Thomas	✓							X	1

=== Draw 4 ===
Friday, March 18, 8:00 am

Sheet A	1	2	3	4	5	6	7	8	Final
(Ontario) Rachel Homan			✓	✓					2
(Alberta) Charley Thomas 🔨							✓		1

Sheet B	1	2	3	4	5	6	7	8	Final
(Saskatchewan) Steve Laycock	✓		✓	✓		✓	X	X	4
(Sweden) Niklas Edin 🔨					✓		X	X	1

Sheet C	1	2	3	4	5	6	7	8	Final
(Manitoba) Reid Carruthers			✓	✓	✓		X	X	3
(Ontario) John Epping 🔨							X	X	0

=== Draw 5 ===
Friday, March 18, 11:30 am

Sheet B	1	2	3	4	5	6	7	8	Final
(Alberta) Charley Thomas 🔨	✓			✓					2
(Ontario) John Epping		✓	✓		✓			✓	4

Sheet C	1	2	3	4	5	6	7	8	Final
(Sweden) Niklas Edin							X	X	0
(Alberta) Kevin Koe 🔨	✓	✓		✓			X	X	3

=== Draw 6 ===
Friday, March 18, 3:00 pm

Sheet A	1	2	3	4	5	6	7	8	Final
(Alberta) Brendan Bottcher 🔨						X	X	X	0
(Alberta) Kevin Koe	✓	✓	✓	✓	✓	X	X	X	5

Sheet B	1	2	3	4	5	6	7	8	Final
(Newfoundland and Labrador) Brad Gushue 🔨			✓	✓	✓			X	3
(Ontario) Rachel Homan	✓							X	1

Sheet C	1	2	3	4	5	6	7	8	Final
(Manitoba) Mike McEwen				✓		✓			2
(Saskatchewan) Steve Laycock 🔨	✓								1

=== Draw 7 ===
Friday, March 18, 7:30 pm

Sheet A	1	2	3	4	5	6	7	8	Final
(Ontario) John Epping						X	X	X	0
(Newfoundland and Labrador) Brad Gushue 🔨	✓	✓	✓		✓	X	X	X	4

Sheet B	1	2	3	4	5	6	7	8	Final
(Manitoba) Mike McEwen 🔨	✓			✓		✓	X	X	3
(Alberta) Brendan Bottcher							X	X	0

Sheet C	1	2	3	4	5	6	7	8	Final
(Alberta) Charley Thomas		✓				✓	✓		3
(Manitoba) Reid Carruthers 🔨	✓		✓		✓			✓	4

== Playoffs ==
Quarterfinals
(Manitoba) Mike McEwen	2
(Saskatchewan) Steve Laycock	3
(Alberta) Kevin Koe	4
(Ontario) John Epping	0

Semifinals
(Newfoundland and Labrador) Brad Gushue	3
(Saskatchewan) Steve Laycock	2
(Manitoba) Reid Carruthers	3
(Alberta) Kevin Koe	2

Final
(Newfoundland and Labrador) Brad Gushue	4
(Manitoba) Reid Carruthers	3

=== Quarterfinals ===
Saturday, March 19, 1:00 pm

Team	1	2	3	4	5	6	7	8	Final
(Manitoba) Mike McEwen 🔨	✓				✓				2
(Saskatchewan) Steve Laycock		✓				✓		✓	3

Player percentages
(Manitoba) Team McEwen		(Saskatchewan) Team Laycock	
Denni Neufeld	95%	Dallan Muyres	90%
Matt Wozniak	94%	Colton Flasch	79%
B. J. Neufeld	95%	Kirk Muyres	84%
Mike McEwen	82%	Steve Laycock	90%
Total	91%	Total	86%

Team	1	2	3	4	5	6	7	8	Final
(Alberta) Kevin Koe 🔨	✓		✓	✓	✓	X	X	X	4
(Ontario) John Epping						X	X	X	0

Player percentages
(Alberta) Team Koe		(Ontario) Team Epping	
Ben Hebert	95%	Tim March	100%
Brent Laing	90%	Patrick Janssen	98%
Marc Kennedy	93%	Mathew Camm	93%
Kevin Koe	93%	John Epping	60%
Total	93%	Total	88%

=== Semifinals ===
Saturday, March 19, 7:30 pm

Team	1	2	3	4	5	6	7	8	9	Final
(Newfoundland and Labrador) Brad Gushue 🔨	✓	✓							✓	3
(Saskatchewan) Steve Laycock							✓	✓		2

Player percentages
(Newfoundland and Labrador) Team Gushue		(Saskatchewan) Team Laycock	
Geoff Walker	98%	Dallan Muyres	98%
Brett Gallant	90%	Colton Flasch	92%
Mark Nichols	96%	Kirk Muyres	86%
Brad Gushue	80%	Steve Laycock	77%
Total	91%	Total	88%

Team	1	2	3	4	5	6	7	8	9	Final
(Manitoba) Reid Carruthers		✓		✓					✓	3
(Alberta) Kevin Koe 🔨	✓							✓		2

Player percentages
(Manitoba) Team Carruthers		(Alberta) Team Koe	
Colin Hodgson	96%	Ben Hebert	87%
Derek Samagalski	76%	Brent Laing	81%
Braeden Moskowy	85%	Marc Kennedy	77%
Reid Carruthers	74%	Kevin Koe	64%
Total	83%	Total	77%

=== Final ===
Sunday, March 20, 1:00 pm

Team	1	2	3	4	5	6	7	8	9	Final
(Newfoundland and Labrador) Brad Gushue	✓		✓		✓				✓	4
(Manitoba) Reid Carruthers		✓				✓	✓			3

Player percentages
(Newfoundland and Labrador) Team Gushue		(Manitoba) Team Carruthers	
Geoff Walker	88%	Colin Hodgson	97%
Brett Gallant	73%	Derek Samagalski	86%
Mark Nichols	75%	Braeden Moskowy	77%
Brad Gushue	70%	Reid Carruthers	62%
Total	77%	Total	81%
