= 2014 The National (March) =

Grand Slam of Curling event

- Host city: Fort McMurray, Alberta
- Arena: MacDonald Island Park
- Dates: March 12–16
- Winner: (Ontario) Glenn Howard
- Curling club: Penetanguishene CC, Penetanguishene
- Skip: Glenn Howard
- Third: Wayne Middaugh
- Second: Brent Laing
- Lead: Craig Savill
- Finalist: (Newfoundland and Labrador) Brad Gushue

The 2014 Syncrude National was held from March 12 to 16 at the MacDonald Island Park in Fort McMurray, Alberta as part of the 2013–14 World Curling Tour. The event was the third men's Grand Slam event of the season. The event was held in a round robin format, and the purse for the event was CAD$100,000.

== Teams ==
The teams are listed as follows:

| Skip | Third | Second | Lead | Locale |
|---|---|---|---|---|
| Brendan Bottcher | Micky Lizmore | Bradley Thiessen | Karrick Martin | Edmonton, Alberta |
| Mark Dacey | Stuart Thompson | Stephen Burgess | Andrew Gibson | Halifax, Nova Scotia |
| Niklas Edin | Sebastian Kraupp | Fredrik Lindberg | Viktor Kjäll | Karlstad, Sweden |
| Oskar Eriksson | Kristian Lindström | Markus Eriksson | Christoffer Sundgren | Lit, Sweden |
| Travis Fanset | Chad Allen | Patrick Janssen | Tim March | Ontario |
| Brad Gushue | Brett Gallant | Adam Casey | Geoff Walker | St. John's, Newfoundland and Labrador |
| Pascal Hess | Florian Meister | Meico Öhninger | Stefan Meienberg | Zug, Switzerland |
| Glenn Howard | Wayne Middaugh | Brent Laing | Craig Savill | Penetanguishene, Ontario |
| Brad Jacobs | Ryan Fry | E. J. Harnden | Ryan Harnden | Sault Ste. Marie, Ontario |
| Kim Soo-hyuk | Kim Tae-huan | Park Jong-duk | Nam Yoon-ho | South Korea |
| Kevin Koe | Pat Simmons | Carter Rycroft | Nolan Thiessen | Calgary, Alberta |
| Steve Laycock | Kirk Muyres | Colton Flasch | Dallan Muyres | Saskatoon, Saskatchewan |
| Kevin Martin | David Nedohin | Marc Kennedy | Ben Hebert | Edmonton, Alberta |
| Mike McEwen | B. J. Neufeld | Matt Wozniak | Denni Neufeld | Winnipeg, Manitoba |
| Sven Michel | Claudio Pätz | Sandro Trolliet | Simon Gempeler | Adelboden, Switzerland |
| Yusuke Morozumi | Tsuyoshi Yamaguchi | Tetsuro Shimizu | Kosuke Morozumi | Karuizawa, Japan |
| Jeff Stoughton | Jon Mead | Reid Carruthers | Mark Nichols | Winnipeg, Manitoba |
| Brock Virtue | Braeden Moskowy | Chris Schille | D. J. Kidby | Regina, Saskatchewan |

== Round-robin standings ==
Final round-robin standings

Key
| Teams to Playoffs |
| Teams to Tiebreaker |

| Pool A | W | L | PF | PA |
|---|---|---|---|---|
| (Switzerland) Sven Michel | 5 | 0 | 34 | 23 |
| (Ontario) Glenn Howard | 4 | 1 | 36 | 26 |
| (Alberta) Kevin Koe | 3 | 2 | 32 | 24 |
| (Nova Scotia) Mark Dacey | 2 | 3 | 27 | 33 |
| (Switzerland) Pascal Hess | 1 | 4 | 19 | 31 |
| (Ontario) Travis Fanset | 0 | 5 | 20 | 31 |

| Pool B | W | L | PF | PA |
|---|---|---|---|---|
| (Manitoba) Mike McEwen | 5 | 0 | 36 | 19 |
| (Alberta) Kevin Martin | 4 | 1 | 32 | 23 |
| (Saskatchewan) Steve Laycock | 3 | 2 | 28 | 26 |
| (Manitoba) Jeff Stoughton | 2 | 3 | 27 | 22 |
| (Alberta) Brendan Bottcher | 1 | 4 | 18 | 22 |
| (Japan) Yusuke Morozumi | 0 | 5 | 17 | 38 |

| Pool C | W | L | PF | PA |
|---|---|---|---|---|
| (Sweden) Oskar Eriksson | 4 | 1 | 36 | 13 |
| (Newfoundland and Labrador) Brad Gushue | 4 | 1 | 29 | 27 |
| (Sweden) Niklas Edin | 3 | 2 | 29 | 26 |
| (Ontario) Brad Jacobs | 2 | 3 | 22 | 30 |
| (South Korea) Kim Soo-hyuk | 2 | 3 | 24 | 28 |
| (Saskatchewan) Brock Virtue | 0 | 5 | 24 | 40 |

== Round-robin results ==
All draw times are listed in Mountain Time Zone (UTC−7).

=== Draw 1 ===
Wednesday, March 12, 7:00 pm

| Sheet A | 1 | 2 | 3 | 4 | 5 | 6 | 7 | 8 | Final |
| (Ontario) Travis Fanset | 0 | 0 | 0 | 1 | 0 | 2 | 0 | X | 3 |
| (Ontario) Glenn Howard 🔨 | 1 | 1 | 0 | 0 | 3 | 0 | 1 | X | 6 |

| Sheet B | 1 | 2 | 3 | 4 | 5 | 6 | 7 | 8 | Final |
| (Alberta) Kevin Martin 🔨 | 0 | 2 | 0 | 0 | 2 | 1 | 0 | 1 | 6 |
| (Japan) Yusuke Morozumi | 1 | 0 | 1 | 1 | 0 | 0 | 2 | 0 | 5 |

| Sheet C | 1 | 2 | 3 | 4 | 5 | 6 | 7 | 8 | 9 | Final |
| (Sweden) Niklas Edin | 0 | 0 | 3 | 0 | 1 | 0 | 0 | 1 | 0 | 5 |
| (Newfoundland and Labrador) Brad Gushue 🔨 | 0 | 1 | 0 | 2 | 0 | 1 | 1 | 0 | 1 | 6 |

| Sheet D | 1 | 2 | 3 | 4 | 5 | 6 | 7 | 8 | 9 | Final |
| (Saskatchewan) Steve Laycock | 0 | 2 | 0 | 2 | 0 | 1 | 0 | 0 | 1 | 6 |
| (Manitoba) Jeff Stoughton 🔨 | 1 | 0 | 1 | 0 | 1 | 0 | 2 | 1 | 0 | 5 |

| Sheet E | 1 | 2 | 3 | 4 | 5 | 6 | 7 | 8 | Final |
| (Alberta) Kevin Koe 🔨 | 0 | 0 | 2 | 0 | 0 | 0 | 1 | 1 | 4 |
| (Switzerland) Sven Michel | 0 | 0 | 0 | 3 | 1 | 1 | 0 | 0 | 5 |

=== Draw 2 ===
Thursday, March 13, 10:00 am

| Sheet A | 1 | 2 | 3 | 4 | 5 | 6 | 7 | 8 | 9 | Final |
| (Saskatchewan) Brock Virtue 🔨 | 2 | 0 | 0 | 2 | 0 | 2 | 0 | 0 | 0 | 6 |
| (Ontario) Brad Jacobs | 0 | 1 | 1 | 0 | 2 | 0 | 1 | 1 | 2 | 8 |

| Sheet B | 1 | 2 | 3 | 4 | 5 | 6 | 7 | 8 | Final |
| (South Korea) Kim Soo-hyuk | 1 | 1 | 0 | 0 | 0 | 1 | X | X | 3 |
| (Sweden) Oskar Eriksson 🔨 | 0 | 0 | 3 | 2 | 2 | 0 | X | X | 7 |

| Sheet C | 1 | 2 | 3 | 4 | 5 | 6 | 7 | 8 | Final |
| (Switzerland) Pascal Hess | 0 | 1 | 0 | 1 | 2 | 0 | 0 | 0 | 4 |
| (Nova Scotia) Mark Dacey 🔨 | 1 | 0 | 3 | 0 | 0 | 1 | 0 | 1 | 6 |

| Sheet D | 1 | 2 | 3 | 4 | 5 | 6 | 7 | 8 | Final |
| (Alberta) Brendan Bottcher | 0 | 0 | 1 | 0 | 0 | X | X | X | 1 |
| (Manitoba) Mike McEwen 🔨 | 3 | 2 | 0 | 1 | 1 | X | X | X | 7 |

| Sheet E | 1 | 2 | 3 | 4 | 5 | 6 | 7 | 8 | 9 | Final |
| (Alberta) Kevin Martin 🔨 | 0 | 1 | 0 | 1 | 0 | 1 | 2 | 0 | 1 | 6 |
| (Saskatchewan) Steve Laycock | 0 | 0 | 2 | 0 | 1 | 0 | 0 | 2 | 0 | 5 |

=== Draw 3 ===
Thursday, March 13, 1:30 pm

| Sheet A | 1 | 2 | 3 | 4 | 5 | 6 | 7 | 8 | Final |
| (Nova Scotia) Mark Dacey | 0 | 2 | 0 | 2 | 0 | X | X | X | 4 |
| (Alberta) Kevin Koe 🔨 | 3 | 0 | 4 | 0 | 4 | X | X | X | 11 |

| Sheet B | 1 | 2 | 3 | 4 | 5 | 6 | 7 | 8 | Final |
| (Manitoba) Jeff Stoughton | 1 | 2 | 1 | 0 | 2 | 0 | X | X | 6 |
| (Alberta) Brendan Bottcher 🔨 | 0 | 0 | 0 | 2 | 0 | 1 | X | X | 3 |

| Sheet C | 1 | 2 | 3 | 4 | 5 | 6 | 7 | 8 | Final |
| (Switzerland) Sven Michel | 0 | 2 | 0 | 2 | 0 | 1 | 1 | 1 | 7 |
| (Ontario) Travis Fanset 🔨 | 1 | 0 | 1 | 0 | 2 | 0 | 0 | 0 | 4 |

| Sheet D | 1 | 2 | 3 | 4 | 5 | 6 | 7 | 8 | Final |
| (Switzerland) Pascal Hess 🔨 | 2 | 0 | 1 | 0 | 0 | 1 | 0 | X | 4 |
| (Ontario) Glenn Howard | 0 | 2 | 0 | 3 | 2 | 0 | 0 | X | 7 |

| Sheet E | 1 | 2 | 3 | 4 | 5 | 6 | 7 | 8 | Final |
| (Japan) Yusuke Morozumi | 0 | 1 | 0 | 2 | 0 | X | X | X | 3 |
| (Manitoba) Mike McEwen 🔨 | 5 | 0 | 1 | 0 | 4 | X | X | X | 10 |

=== Draw 4 ===
Thursday, March 13, 5:00 pm

| Sheet B | 1 | 2 | 3 | 4 | 5 | 6 | 7 | 8 | Final |
| (Ontario) Glenn Howard | 0 | 0 | 3 | 0 | 2 | 0 | 4 | 0 | 9 |
| (Switzerland) Sven Michel 🔨 | 0 | 4 | 0 | 2 | 0 | 1 | 0 | 3 | 10 |

| Sheet C | 1 | 2 | 3 | 4 | 5 | 6 | 7 | 8 | Final |
| (Sweden) Niklas Edin | 1 | 0 | 1 | 0 | 3 | 0 | 3 | X | 8 |
| (Ontario) Brad Jacobs 🔨 | 0 | 2 | 0 | 1 | 0 | 1 | 0 | X | 4 |

| Sheet D | 1 | 2 | 3 | 4 | 5 | 6 | 7 | 8 | Final |
| (Alberta) Kevin Koe | 1 | 0 | 0 | 2 | 1 | 0 | 1 | X | 5 |
| (Ontario) Travis Fanset 🔨 | 0 | 1 | 1 | 0 | 0 | 1 | 0 | X | 3 |

| Sheet E | 1 | 2 | 3 | 4 | 5 | 6 | 7 | 8 | Final |
| (Saskatchewan) Brock Virtue | 0 | 2 | 0 | 0 | 0 | 0 | X | X | 2 |
| (Sweden) Oskar Eriksson 🔨 | 1 | 0 | 3 | 3 | 0 | 1 | X | X | 8 |

=== Draw 5 ===
Thursday, March 13, 8:00 pm

| Sheet B | 1 | 2 | 3 | 4 | 5 | 6 | 7 | 8 | Final |
| (Sweden) Niklas Edin 🔨 | 2 | 0 | 0 | 2 | 0 | 1 | 0 | 1 | 6 |
| (Saskatchewan) Brock Virtue | 0 | 3 | 0 | 0 | 1 | 0 | 1 | 0 | 5 |

| Sheet C | 1 | 2 | 3 | 4 | 5 | 6 | 7 | 8 | Final |
| (Alberta) Kevin Martin 🔨 | 2 | 0 | 1 | 0 | 1 | 0 | 1 | 1 | 6 |
| (Manitoba) Mike McEwen | 0 | 4 | 0 | 1 | 0 | 2 | 0 | 0 | 7 |

| Sheet D | 1 | 2 | 3 | 4 | 5 | 6 | 7 | 8 | Final |
| (Ontario) Brad Jacobs 🔨 | 1 | 0 | 1 | 0 | 1 | 0 | 1 | 0 | 4 |
| (Newfoundland and Labrador) Brad Gushue | 0 | 1 | 0 | 2 | 0 | 2 | 0 | 1 | 6 |

| Sheet E | 1 | 2 | 3 | 4 | 5 | 6 | 7 | 8 | Final |
| (Japan) Yusuke Morozumi | 0 | 1 | 0 | 0 | X | X | X | X | 1 |
| (Manitoba) Jeff Stoughton 🔨 | 3 | 0 | 4 | 1 | X | X | X | X | 8 |

=== Draw 6 ===
Friday, March 14, 10:00 am

| Sheet A | 1 | 2 | 3 | 4 | 5 | 6 | 7 | 8 | 9 | Final |
| (Sweden) Niklas Edin 🔨 | 0 | 2 | 0 | 2 | 0 | 1 | 0 | 0 | 1 | 6 |
| (Sweden) Oskar Eriksson | 1 | 0 | 1 | 0 | 1 | 0 | 1 | 1 | 0 | 5 |

| Sheet B | 1 | 2 | 3 | 4 | 5 | 6 | 7 | 8 | Final |
| (Alberta) Kevin Koe 🔨 | 1 | 0 | 1 | 0 | 0 | 3 | 0 | 3 | 8 |
| (Switzerland) Pascal Hess | 0 | 1 | 0 | 0 | 2 | 0 | 1 | 0 | 4 |

| Sheet C | 1 | 2 | 3 | 4 | 5 | 6 | 7 | 8 | Final |
| (Japan) Yusuke Morozumi 🔨 | 1 | 0 | 0 | 1 | 0 | 2 | 0 | X | 4 |
| (Alberta) Brendan Bottcher | 0 | 1 | 3 | 0 | 2 | 0 | 2 | X | 8 |

| Sheet D | 1 | 2 | 3 | 4 | 5 | 6 | 7 | 8 | Final |
| (South Korea) Kim Soo-hyuk 🔨 | 1 | 1 | 0 | 2 | 0 | 2 | 0 | 2 | 8 |
| (Saskatchewan) Brock Virtue | 0 | 0 | 1 | 0 | 2 | 0 | 3 | 0 | 6 |

| Sheet E | 1 | 2 | 3 | 4 | 5 | 6 | 7 | 8 | Final |
| (Nova Scotia) Mark Dacey | 0 | 0 | 2 | 0 | 1 | 0 | 1 | 1 | 5 |
| (Ontario) Glenn Howard 🔨 | 1 | 2 | 0 | 2 | 0 | 1 | 0 | 0 | 6 |

=== Draw 7 ===
Friday, March 14, 1:30 pm

| Sheet A | 1 | 2 | 3 | 4 | 5 | 6 | 7 | 8 | Final |
| (South Korea) Kim Soo-hyuk | 0 | 1 | 0 | 1 | 0 | 0 | 0 | X | 2 |
| (Ontario) Brad Jacobs 🔨 | 3 | 0 | 0 | 0 | 0 | 0 | 2 | X | 5 |

| Sheet B | 1 | 2 | 3 | 4 | 5 | 6 | 7 | 8 | 9 | Final |
| (Ontario) Travis Fanset 🔨 | 1 | 1 | 0 | 0 | 2 | 1 | 0 | 1 | 0 | 6 |
| (Nova Scotia) Mark Dacey | 0 | 0 | 2 | 2 | 0 | 0 | 2 | 0 | 1 | 7 |

| Sheet C | 1 | 2 | 3 | 4 | 5 | 6 | 7 | 8 | Final |
| (Newfoundland and Labrador) Brad Gushue 🔨 | 2 | 0 | 3 | 0 | 1 | 0 | 4 | X | 10 |
| (Saskatchewan) Brock Virtue | 0 | 1 | 0 | 2 | 0 | 2 | 0 | X | 5 |

| Sheet D | 1 | 2 | 3 | 4 | 5 | 6 | 7 | 8 | Final |
| (Switzerland) Pascal Hess | 0 | 0 | 0 | 0 | 1 | 0 | X | X | 1 |
| (Switzerland) Sven Michel 🔨 | 2 | 1 | 1 | 1 | 0 | 1 | X | X | 6 |

| Sheet E | 1 | 2 | 3 | 4 | 5 | 6 | 7 | 8 | Final |
| (Manitoba) Mike McEwen | 1 | 0 | 0 | 2 | 0 | 2 | 0 | 1 | 6 |
| (Saskatchewan) Steve Laycock 🔨 | 0 | 0 | 2 | 0 | 2 | 0 | 1 | 0 | 5 |

=== Draw 8 ===
Friday, March 14, 5:00 pm

| Sheet A | 1 | 2 | 3 | 4 | 5 | 6 | 7 | 8 | Final |
| (Manitoba) Mike McEwen 🔨 | 1 | 1 | 1 | 0 | 2 | 0 | 0 | 1 | 6 |
| (Manitoba) Jeff Stoughton | 0 | 0 | 0 | 2 | 0 | 2 | 0 | 0 | 4 |

| Sheet B | 1 | 2 | 3 | 4 | 5 | 6 | 7 | 8 | 9 | Final |
| (Saskatchewan) Steve Laycock 🔨 | 0 | 1 | 1 | 0 | 1 | 1 | 0 | 0 | 2 | 6 |
| (Japan) Yusuke Morozumi | 1 | 0 | 0 | 1 | 0 | 0 | 1 | 1 | 0 | 4 |

| Sheet C | 1 | 2 | 3 | 4 | 5 | 6 | 7 | 8 | Final |
| (Ontario) Glenn Howard 🔨 | 2 | 0 | 2 | 0 | 3 | 0 | 1 | X | 8 |
| (Alberta) Kevin Koe | 0 | 1 | 0 | 1 | 0 | 2 | 0 | X | 4 |

| Sheet D | 1 | 2 | 3 | 4 | 5 | 6 | 7 | 8 | Final |
| (Alberta) Kevin Martin 🔨 | 2 | 1 | 2 | 0 | 1 | 2 | X | X | 8 |
| (Alberta) Brendan Bottcher | 0 | 0 | 0 | 2 | 0 | 0 | X | X | 2 |

| Sheet E | 1 | 2 | 3 | 4 | 5 | 6 | 7 | 8 | Final |
| (Sweden) Oskar Eriksson 🔨 | 3 | 1 | 0 | 4 | X | X | X | X | 8 |
| (Newfoundland and Labrador) Brad Gushue | 0 | 0 | 1 | 0 | X | X | X | X | 1 |

=== Draw 9 ===
Friday, March 14, 8:30 pm

| Sheet A | 1 | 2 | 3 | 4 | 5 | 6 | 7 | 8 | Final |
| (Switzerland) Sven Michel | 0 | 1 | 0 | 0 | 2 | 0 | 2 | 1 | 6 |
| (Nova Scotia) Mark Dacey 🔨 | 2 | 0 | 1 | 1 | 0 | 1 | 0 | 0 | 5 |

| Sheet B | 1 | 2 | 3 | 4 | 5 | 6 | 7 | 8 | Final |
| (Ontario) Brad Jacobs | 0 | 1 | 0 | X | X | X | X | X | 1 |
| (Sweden) Oskar Eriksson 🔨 | 3 | 0 | 5 | X | X | X | X | X | 8 |

| Sheet C | 1 | 2 | 3 | 4 | 5 | 6 | 7 | 8 | Final |
| (Alberta) Kevin Martin 🔨 | 1 | 0 | 1 | 0 | 2 | 1 | 1 | X | 6 |
| (Manitoba) Jeff Stoughton | 0 | 3 | 0 | 1 | 0 | 0 | 0 | X | 4 |

| Sheet D | 1 | 2 | 3 | 4 | 5 | 6 | 7 | 8 | Final |
| (Sweden) Niklas Edin 🔨 | 0 | 2 | 0 | 0 | 0 | 0 | 0 | 2 | 4 |
| (South Korea) Kim Soo-hyuk | 1 | 0 | 0 | 2 | 1 | 1 | 1 | 0 | 6 |

| Sheet E | 1 | 2 | 3 | 4 | 5 | 6 | 7 | 8 | Final |
| (Ontario) Travis Fanset 🔨 | 0 | 2 | 0 | 2 | 0 | 0 | 0 | 0 | 4 |
| (Switzerland) Pascal Hess | 1 | 0 | 1 | 0 | 1 | 1 | 1 | 1 | 6 |

=== Draw 10 ===
Saturday, March 15, 9:00 am

| Sheet A | 1 | 2 | 3 | 4 | 5 | 6 | 7 | 8 | Final |
| (South Korea) Kim Soo-hyuk 🔨 | 1 | 0 | 1 | 2 | 0 | 1 | 0 | 0 | 5 |
| (Newfoundland and Labrador) Brad Gushue | 0 | 1 | 0 | 0 | 4 | 0 | 0 | 1 | 6 |

| Sheet B | 1 | 2 | 3 | 4 | 5 | 6 | 7 | 8 | Final |
| (Saskatchewan) Steve Laycock | 1 | 0 | 2 | 0 | 1 | 1 | 0 | 1 | 6 |
| (Alberta) Brendan Bottcher 🔨 | 0 | 2 | 0 | 1 | 0 | 0 | 2 | 0 | 5 |

== Tiebreaker ==
Saturday, March 15, 12:00 pm

| Team | 1 | 2 | 3 | 4 | 5 | 6 | 7 | 8 | Final |
| (Alberta) Kevin Koe 🔨 | 1 | 0 | 0 | 1 | 0 | 1 | 1 | 1 | 5 |
| (Sweden) Niklas Edin | 0 | 1 | 1 | 0 | 2 | 0 | 0 | 0 | 4 |

Player percentages
| (Alberta) Kevin Koe | | (Sweden) Niklas Edin | |
|---|---|---|---|
| Nolan Thiessen | 92% | Viktor Kjäll | 79% |
| Carter Rycroft | 94% | Fredrik Lindberg | 94% |
| Pat Simmons | 86% | Sebastian Kraupp | 82% |
| Kevin Koe | 84% | Niklas Edin | 81% |
| Total | 89% | Total | 84% |

== Playoffs ==
Quarterfinals
(Switzerland) Sven Michel | 9
(Alberta) Kevin Koe | 6
(Sweden) Oskar Eriksson | 5
(Newfoundland and Labrador) Brad Gushue | 7
(Manitoba) Mike McEwen | 2
(Saskatchewan) Steve Laycock | 5
(Alberta) Kevin Martin | 3
(Ontario) Glenn Howard | 7

Semifinals
(Switzerland) Sven Michel | 6
(Newfoundland and Labrador) Brad Gushue | 7
(Saskatchewan) Steve Laycock | 6
(Ontario) Glenn Howard | 10

Final
(Newfoundland and Labrador) Brad Gushue | 6
(Ontario) Glenn Howard | 7

=== Quarterfinals ===
Saturday, March 15, 3:00 pm

| Team | 1 | 2 | 3 | 4 | 5 | 6 | 7 | 8 | Final |
| (Switzerland) Sven Michel 🔨 | 2 | 0 | 1 | 0 | 2 | 0 | 3 | 1 | 9 |
| (Alberta) Kevin Koe | 0 | 2 | 0 | 3 | 0 | 1 | 0 | 0 | 6 |

Player percentages
| (Switzerland) Sven Michel | | (Alberta) Kevin Koe | |
|---|---|---|---|
| Simon Gempeler | 92% | Nolan Thiessen | 93% |
| Sandro Trolliet | 71% | Carter Rycroft | 91% |
| Claudio Pätz | 82% | Pat Simmons | 86% |
| Sven Michel | 86% | Kevin Koe | 75% |
| Total | 83% | Total | 86% |

| Team | 1 | 2 | 3 | 4 | 5 | 6 | 7 | 8 | Final |
| (Sweden) Oskar Eriksson | 0 | 0 | 2 | 0 | 2 | 0 | 1 | 0 | 5 |
| (Newfoundland and Labrador) Brad Gushue 🔨 | 0 | 1 | 0 | 2 | 0 | 1 | 0 | 3 | 7 |

Player percentages
| (Sweden) Oskar Eriksson | | (Newfoundland and Labrador) Brad Gushue | |
|---|---|---|---|
| Christoffer Sundgren | 92% | Geoff Walker | 90% |
| Markus Eriksson | 84% | Adam Casey | 85% |
| Kristian Lindström | 77% | Brett Gallant | 84% |
| Oskar Eriksson | 72% | Brad Gushue | 81% |
| Total | 81% | Total | 85% |

| Team | 1 | 2 | 3 | 4 | 5 | 6 | 7 | 8 | Final |
| (Manitoba) Mike McEwen 🔨 | 1 | 0 | 1 | 0 | 0 | 0 | 0 | X | 2 |
| (Saskatchewan) Steve Laycock | 0 | 3 | 0 | 0 | 1 | 1 | 0 | X | 5 |

Player percentages
| (Manitoba) Mike McEwen | | (Saskatchewan) Steve Laycock | |
|---|---|---|---|
| Denni Neufeld | 92% | Dallan Muyres | 78% |
| Matt Wozniak | 77% | Colton Flasch | 80% |
| B.J. Neufeld | 79% | Kirk Muyres | 75% |
| Mike McEwen | 65% | Steve Laycock | 92% |
| Total | 78% | Total | 81% |

| Team | 1 | 2 | 3 | 4 | 5 | 6 | 7 | 8 | Final |
| (Alberta) Kevin Martin | 0 | 1 | 0 | 0 | 1 | 1 | 0 | X | 3 |
| (Ontario) Glenn Howard 🔨 | 2 | 0 | 2 | 1 | 0 | 0 | 2 | X | 7 |

Player percentages
| (Alberta) Kevin Martin | | (Ontario) Glenn Howard | |
|---|---|---|---|
| Ben Hebert | 92% | Craig Savill | 70% |
| Marc Kennedy | 93% | Brent Laing | 88% |
| David Nedohin | 86% | Wayne Middaugh | 100% |
| Kevin Martin | 77% | Glenn Howard | 98% |
| Total | 87% | Total | 89% |

=== Semifinals ===
Saturday, March 15, 6:30 pm

| Team | 1 | 2 | 3 | 4 | 5 | 6 | 7 | 8 | Final |
| (Switzerland) Sven Michel 🔨 | 1 | 0 | 1 | 0 | 2 | 0 | 2 | 0 | 6 |
| (Newfoundland and Labrador) Brad Gushue | 0 | 2 | 0 | 1 | 0 | 3 | 0 | 1 | 7 |

Player percentages
| (Switzerland) Sven Michel | | (Newfoundland and Labrador) Brad Gushue | |
|---|---|---|---|
| Simon Gempeler | 89% | Geoff Walker | 94% |
| Sandro Trolliet | 79% | Adam Casey | 89% |
| Claudio Pätz | 86% | Brett Gallant | 97% |
| Sven Michel | 85% | Brad Gushue | 92% |
| Total | 85% | Total | 93% |

| Team | 1 | 2 | 3 | 4 | 5 | 6 | 7 | 8 | Final |
| (Saskatchewan) Steve Laycock | 0 | 1 | 0 | 2 | 0 | 3 | 0 | X | 6 |
| (Ontario) Glenn Howard 🔨 | 2 | 0 | 2 | 0 | 2 | 0 | 4 | X | 10 |

Player percentages
| (Saskatchewan) Steve Laycock | | (Ontario) Glenn Howard | |
|---|---|---|---|
| Dallan Muyres | 89% | Craig Savill | 100% |
| Colton Flasch | 70% | Brent Laing | 100% |
| Kirk Muyres | 86% | Wayne Middaugh | 92% |
| Steve Laycock | 74% | Glenn Howard | 90% |
| Total | 80% | Total | 95% |

=== Final ===
Sunday, March 16, 10:00 am

| Team | 1 | 2 | 3 | 4 | 5 | 6 | 7 | 8 | Final |
| (Newfoundland and Labrador) Brad Gushue | 0 | 0 | 2 | 0 | 2 | 0 | 2 | 0 | 6 |
| (Ontario) Glenn Howard 🔨 | 2 | 0 | 0 | 2 | 0 | 2 | 0 | 1 | 7 |

Player percentages
| (Newfoundland and Labrador) Brad Gushue | | (Ontario) Glenn Howard | |
|---|---|---|---|
| Geoff Walker | 98% | Craig Savill | 86% |
| Adam Casey | 91% | Brent Laing | 93% |
| Brett Gallant | 80% | Wayne Middaugh | 73% |
| Brad Gushue | 95% | Glenn Howard | 95% |
| Total | 91% | Total | 87% |
