= 2014 World Men's Curling Championship =

- Host city: Beijing, China
- Arena: Capital Indoor Stadium
- Dates: March 29 – April 6, 2014
- Winner: Norway
- Curling club: Snarøen CC, Oslo
- Skip: Thomas Ulsrud
- Third: Torger Nergård
- Second: Christoffer Svae
- Lead: Håvard Vad Petersson
- Alternate: Markus Høiberg
- Coach: Pål Trulsen
- Finalist: Sweden (Oskar Eriksson)

The 2014 World Men's Curling Championship was held from March 29 to April 6 at the Capital Indoor Stadium in Beijing, China.

Norway's Thomas Ulsrud defeated Sweden's Oskar Eriksson in the final with a score of 8–3, securing his first world title and the fourth world title overall for Norway.

== Qualification ==
The following nations qualified to participate in the 2014 World Men's Curling Championship:

- China (host country)
- Two teams from the Americas zone
  - Canada
  - United States (given that no challenges in the Americas zone are issued)
- Eight teams from the 2013 European Curling Championships
  - Norway
  - Switzerland
  - Denmark
  - Scotland
  - Sweden
  - Russia
  - Czech Republic
  - Germany
- One team from the 2013 Pacific-Asia Curling Championships
  - Japan

== Teams ==
Canada	China	Czech Republic
Glencoe CC, Calgary Skip: Kevin Koe; Third: Pat Simmons; Second: Carter Rycroft; Lead: Nolan Thiessen; Alternate: Jamie King	Harbin CC, Harbin Skip: Liu Rui; Third: Xu Xiaoming; Second: Ba Dexin; Lead: Zang Jialiang; Alternate: Zou Dejia	Brno CK, Brno Skip: Jiří Snítil; Third: Martin Snítil; Second: Jindřich Kitzberger; Lead: Jakub Bareš; Alternate: Marek Vydra
Denmark	Germany	Japan
Hvidovre CC, Hvidovre Skip: Rasmus Stjerne; Third: Johnny Frederiksen; Second: Lars Vilandt; Lead: Troels Harry; Alternate: Oliver Dupont	CC Hamburg, Hamburg Fourth: Felix Schulze; Skip: John Jahr; Second: Christopher Bartsch; Lead: Sven Goldemann; Alternate: Peter Rickmers	Karuizawa CC, Karuizawa Skip: Yusuke Morozumi; Third: Tsuyoshi Yamaguchi; Second: Tetsuro Shimizu; Lead: Kosuke Morozumi
Norway	Russia	Scotland
Snarøen CC, Oslo Skip: Thomas Ulsrud; Third: Torger Nergård; Second: Christoffer Svae; Lead: Håvard Vad Petersson; Alternate: Markus Høiberg	Moskvitch CC, Moscow Fourth: Alexey Stukalskiy; Third: Sergey Glukhov; Skip: Evgeniy Arkhipov; Lead: Petr Dron; Alternate: Alexander Kozyrev	Citadel CC, Inverness Skip: Ewan MacDonald; Third: Duncan Fernie; Second: Dave Reid; Lead: Euan Byers; Alternate: Glen Muirhead
Sweden	Switzerland	United States
Lits CC, Lit Skip: Oskar Eriksson; Third: Kristian Lindström; Second: Markus Eriksson; Lead: Christoffer Sundgren; Alternate: Gustav Eskilsson	CC Genève, Geneva Fourth: Benoît Schwarz; Skip: Peter de Cruz; Second: Dominik Märki; Lead: Valentin Tanner; Alternate: Claudio Pätz	Bemidji CC, Bemidji Skip: Pete Fenson; Third: Shawn Rojeski; Second: Joe Polo; Lead: Ryan Brunt; Alternate: Jared Zezel

== Round-robin standings ==
Final round-robin standings

Key
Teams to playoffs
Teams to tiebreaker

Country	Skip	W	L	PF	PA	Ends Won	Ends Lost	Blank Ends	Stolen Ends	Shot Pct.
Norway	Thomas Ulsrud	10	1	82	47	51	38	12	13	86%
Canada	Kevin Koe	8	3	80	58	49	43	6	15	84%
Switzerland	Peter de Cruz	7	4	79	68	48	44	17	11	80%
Sweden	Oskar Eriksson	7	4	72	57	46	41	15	15	81%
Japan	Yusuke Morozumi	7	4	74	70	45	45	10	12	82%
China	Liu Rui	6	5	67	67	45	43	19	9	82%
Czech Republic	Jiří Snítil	6	5	71	73	43	45	17	10	78%
Germany	John Jahr	5	6	73	75	46	43	9	11	78%
Scotland	Ewan MacDonald	3	8	64	84	45	49	9	10	78%
United States	Pete Fenson	3	8	61	76	43	48	16	11	81%
Russia	Evgeny Arkhipov	2	9	55	84	38	49	10	7	78%
Denmark	Rasmus Stjerne	2	9	54	73	41	50	12	6	78%

== Round-robin results ==
=== Draw 1 ===
Saturday, March 29, 14:00

Sheet A	1	2	3	4	5	6	7	8	9	10	Final
Switzerland (de Cruz) 🔨	2	0	0	1	0	1	0	0	2	1	7
Russia (Arkhipov)	0	2	0	0	1	0	3	2	0	0	8

Sheet B	1	2	3	4	5	6	7	8	9	10	Final
United States (Fenson) 🔨	1	0	0	2	0	2	0	0	2	0	7
Czech Republic (Snítil)	0	1	0	0	3	0	0	3	0	2	9

Sheet C	1	2	3	4	5	6	7	8	9	10	Final
Germany (Jahr)	1	0	2	0	2	0	0	3	3	X	11
China (Liu) 🔨	0	2	0	2	0	1	0	0	0	X	5

Sheet D	1	2	3	4	5	6	7	8	9	10	Final
Scotland (MacDonald)	0	1	0	1	0	1	0	1	X	X	4
Sweden (Eriksson) 🔨	3	0	2	0	1	0	2	0	X	X	8

=== Draw 2 ===
Saturday, March 29, 19:00

Sheet A	1	2	3	4	5	6	7	8	9	10	Final
Denmark (Stjerne)	0	1	0	0	0	0	1	0	1	X	3
Canada (Koe) 🔨	1	0	2	1	1	0	0	1	0	X	6

Sheet B	1	2	3	4	5	6	7	8	9	10	Final
Russia (Arkhipov) 🔨	0	1	0	1	0	1	0	2	0	0	5
Germany (Jahr)	1	0	2	0	1	0	1	0	2	2	9

Sheet C	1	2	3	4	5	6	7	8	9	10	Final
Sweden (Eriksson) 🔨	0	2	0	1	1	0	1	0	2	1	8
United States (Fenson)	3	0	1	0	0	0	0	2	0	0	6

Sheet D	1	2	3	4	5	6	7	8	9	10	Final
Norway (Ulsrud)	0	1	0	1	0	4	0	2	0	1	9
Japan (Morozumi) 🔨	0	0	1	0	1	0	2	0	1	0	5

=== Draw 3 ===
Sunday, March 30, 9:00

Sheet B	1	2	3	4	5	6	7	8	9	10	11	Final
China (Liu) 🔨	1	0	2	0	0	3	0	0	2	0	3	11
Scotland (MacDonald)	0	1	0	1	0	0	1	3	0	2	0	8

Sheet C	1	2	3	4	5	6	7	8	9	10	Final
Switzerland (de Cruz) 🔨	2	0	0	2	2	1	1	0	1	X	9
Czech Republic (Snítil)	0	2	1	0	0	0	0	1	0	X	4

=== Draw 4 ===
Sunday, March 30, 14:00

Sheet A	1	2	3	4	5	6	7	8	9	10	Final
Sweden (Eriksson)	0	2	0	0	1	0	0	2	0	0	5
Germany (Jahr) 🔨	1	0	1	1	0	2	0	0	0	2	7

Sheet B	1	2	3	4	5	6	7	8	9	10	Final
Japan (Morozumi) 🔨	1	0	1	0	0	3	1	0	1	2	9
Canada (Koe)	0	2	0	1	2	0	0	1	0	0	6

Sheet C	1	2	3	4	5	6	7	8	9	10	Final
Denmark (Stjerne)	0	0	1	0	1	0	1	0	X	X	3
Norway (Ulsrud) 🔨	2	1	0	2	0	2	0	1	X	X	8

Sheet D	1	2	3	4	5	6	7	8	9	10	11	Final
United States (Fenson) 🔨	1	0	0	2	0	0	0	2	0	0	1	6
Russia (Arkhipov)	0	1	0	0	0	0	2	0	1	1	0	5

=== Draw 5 ===
Sunday, March 30, 19:00

Sheet A	1	2	3	4	5	6	7	8	9	10	Final
Czech Republic (Snítil)	0	0	1	1	0	0	2	1	0	X	5
Norway (Ulsrud) 🔨	1	3	0	0	4	0	0	0	1	X	9

Sheet B	1	2	3	4	5	6	7	8	9	10	11	Final
Denmark (Stjerne) 🔨	0	0	0	0	2	0	0	0	2	1	0	5
Switzerland (de Cruz)	0	2	0	1	0	0	0	2	0	0	1	6

Sheet C	1	2	3	4	5	6	7	8	9	10	Final
Japan (Morozumi) 🔨	2	0	1	0	1	2	0	0	3	X	9
Scotland (MacDonald)	0	1	0	1	0	0	0	2	0	X	4

Sheet D	1	2	3	4	5	6	7	8	9	10	Final
China (Liu) 🔨	1	0	1	1	0	0	1	0	2	0	6
Canada (Koe)	0	1	0	0	2	3	0	2	0	1	9

=== Draw 6 ===
Monday, March 31, 9:00

Sheet A	1	2	3	4	5	6	7	8	9	10	Final
United States (Fenson)	2	1	0	0	0	0	1	1	0	0	5
Japan (Morozumi) 🔨	0	0	0	2	1	1	0	0	2	3	9

Sheet B	1	2	3	4	5	6	7	8	9	10	Final
Norway (Ulsrud) 🔨	2	1	0	0	1	0	1	0	1	X	6
Sweden (Eriksson)	0	0	1	0	0	1	0	1	0	X	3

Sheet C	1	2	3	4	5	6	7	8	9	10	Final
Canada (Koe)	1	1	1	1	0	0	5	X	X	X	9
Russia (Arkhipov) 🔨	0	0	0	0	0	1	0	X	X	X	1

Sheet D	1	2	3	4	5	6	7	8	9	10	Final
Denmark (Stjerne)	0	4	0	4	1	0	X	X	X	X	9
Germany (Jahr) 🔨	1	0	2	0	0	1	X	X	X	X	4

=== Draw 7 ===
Monday, March 31, 14:00

Sheet A	1	2	3	4	5	6	7	8	9	10	11	Final
Russia (Arkhipov)	1	0	0	1	0	0	0	2	0	2	0	6
Sweden (Eriksson) 🔨	0	2	1	0	0	2	0	0	1	0	1	7

Sheet B	1	2	3	4	5	6	7	8	9	10	Final
Czech Republic (Snítil)	0	0	1	0	0	0	3	0	1	0	5
China (Liu) 🔨	0	2	0	2	0	1	0	0	0	1	6

Sheet C	1	2	3	4	5	6	7	8	9	10	Final
United States (Fenson) 🔨	1	0	3	0	2	1	1	0	X	X	8
Germany (Jahr)	0	1	0	1	0	0	0	1	X	X	3

Sheet D	1	2	3	4	5	6	7	8	9	10	11	Final
Switzerland (de Cruz) 🔨	3	0	0	3	0	1	1	0	1	0	0	9
Scotland (MacDonald)	0	2	0	0	2	0	0	2	0	3	1	10

=== Draw 8 ===
Monday, March 31, 19:00

Sheet A	1	2	3	4	5	6	7	8	9	10	Final
Norway (Ulsrud)	0	0	0	1	1	0	2	0	0	1	5
China (Liu) 🔨	0	0	1	0	0	0	0	2	0	0	3

Sheet B	1	2	3	4	5	6	7	8	9	10	Final
Switzerland (de Cruz) 🔨	2	0	2	2	0	0	2	X	X	X	8
Japan (Morozumi)	0	1	0	0	0	2	0	X	X	X	3

Sheet C	1	2	3	4	5	6	7	8	9	10	Final
Scotland (MacDonald) 🔨	0	2	1	0	2	0	0	0	1	0	6
Denmark (Stjerne)	0	0	0	2	0	2	0	1	0	2	7

Sheet D	1	2	3	4	5	6	7	8	9	10	Final
Canada (Koe)	0	1	0	2	0	2	0	1	4	X	10
Czech Republic (Snítil) 🔨	2	0	2	0	2	0	0	0	0	X	6

=== Draw 9 ===
Tuesday, April 1, 9:00

Sheet A	1	2	3	4	5	6	7	8	9	10	11	Final
Germany (Jahr)	0	1	0	1	0	1	0	2	0	1	0	6
Switzerland (de Cruz) 🔨	1	0	0	0	1	0	3	0	1	0	1	7

Sheet B	1	2	3	4	5	6	7	8	9	10	Final
United States (Fenson)	0	2	0	1	1	0	0	1	0	1	6
Scotland (MacDonald) 🔨	1	0	2	0	0	1	1	0	3	0	8

Sheet C	1	2	3	4	5	6	7	8	9	10	Final
Czech Republic (Snítil) 🔨	0	0	0	1	0	0	0	2	1	1	5
Sweden (Eriksson)	0	0	0	0	0	1	2	0	0	0	3

Sheet D	1	2	3	4	5	6	7	8	9	10	Final
Russia (Arkhipov) 🔨	0	1	0	0	1	0	1	0	1	0	4
China (Liu)	1	0	0	1	0	1	0	1	0	1	5

=== Draw 10 ===
Tuesday, April 1, 14:00

Sheet A	1	2	3	4	5	6	7	8	9	10	Final
Canada (Koe)	0	2	0	1	1	0	2	0	1	X	7
United States (Fenson) 🔨	1	0	1	0	0	1	0	1	0	X	4

Sheet B	1	2	3	4	5	6	7	8	9	10	Final
Sweden (Eriksson) 🔨	0	2	1	0	2	0	4	X	X	X	9
Denmark (Stjerne)	1	0	0	1	0	2	0	X	X	X	4

Sheet C	1	2	3	4	5	6	7	8	9	10	Final
Russia (Arkhipov)	0	3	0	1	0	0	0	1	1	1	7
Japan (Morozumi) 🔨	2	0	1	0	3	1	1	0	0	0	8

Sheet D	1	2	3	4	5	6	7	8	9	10	11	Final
Germany (Jahr)	0	2	0	2	0	1	0	0	1	0	1	7
Norway (Ulsrud) 🔨	2	0	1	0	1	0	0	1	0	1	0	6

=== Draw 11 ===
Tuesday, April 1, 19:00

Sheet A	1	2	3	4	5	6	7	8	9	10	Final
Czech Republic (Snítil)	0	2	0	0	1	0	0	2	0	1	6
Scotland (MacDonald) 🔨	0	0	1	1	0	1	0	0	2	0	5

Sheet B	1	2	3	4	5	6	7	8	9	10	Final
Canada (Koe) 🔨	1	0	0	2	0	1	0	1	0	X	5
Norway (Ulsrud)	0	3	1	0	1	0	1	0	3	X	9

Sheet C	1	2	3	4	5	6	7	8	9	10	Final
China (Liu)	0	0	2	0	2	0	0	2	0	0	6
Switzerland (de Cruz) 🔨	0	2	0	2	0	2	1	0	0	0	7

Sheet D	1	2	3	4	5	6	7	8	9	10	Final
Japan (Morozumi) 🔨	0	2	0	0	2	0	4	X	X	X	8
Denmark (Stjerne)	0	0	1	0	0	1	0	X	X	X	2

=== Draw 12 ===
Wednesday, April 2, 9:00

Sheet A	1	2	3	4	5	6	7	8	9	10	Final
China (Liu) 🔨	2	1	0	0	0	2	0	1	0	X	6
Denmark (Stjerne)	0	0	1	1	0	0	1	0	1	X	4

Sheet B	1	2	3	4	5	6	7	8	9	10	Final
Japan (Morozumi)	1	1	0	0	2	0	0	1	0	2	7
Czech Republic (Snítil) 🔨	0	0	1	0	0	1	1	0	2	0	5

Sheet C	1	2	3	4	5	6	7	8	9	10	Final
Norway (Ulsrud)	1	1	1	0	0	0	1	0	2	X	6
Scotland (MacDonald) 🔨	0	0	0	1	1	1	0	1	0	X	4

Sheet D	1	2	3	4	5	6	7	8	9	10	Final
Canada (Koe) 🔨	1	1	0	0	0	2	2	0	2	X	8
Switzerland (de Cruz)	0	0	0	1	1	0	0	2	0	X	4

=== Draw 13 ===
Wednesday, April 2, 14:00

Sheet A	1	2	3	4	5	6	7	8	9	10	Final
Switzerland (de Cruz) 🔨	0	2	0	0	0	3	0	2	0	1	8
Sweden (Eriksson)	0	0	3	1	0	0	1	0	1	0	6

Sheet B	1	2	3	4	5	6	7	8	9	10	Final
Scotland (MacDonald) 🔨	1	0	2	1	0	2	1	0	0	X	7
Russia (Arkhipov)	0	2	0	0	1	0	0	0	2	X	5

Sheet C	1	2	3	4	5	6	7	8	9	10	Final
Germany (Jahr)	0	2	0	0	1	0	1	0	0	X	4
Czech Republic (Snítil) 🔨	3	0	1	1	0	0	0	2	1	X	8

Sheet D	1	2	3	4	5	6	7	8	9	10	Final
China (Liu) 🔨	0	0	1	2	1	3	0	0	1	X	8
United States (Fenson)	0	0	0	0	0	0	3	1	0	X	4

=== Draw 14 ===
Wednesday, April 2, 19:00

Sheet A	1	2	3	4	5	6	7	8	9	10	Final
Japan (Morozumi)	0	0	0	2	0	2	2	0	0	2	8
Germany (Jahr) 🔨	0	2	0	0	2	0	0	1	2	0	7

Sheet B	1	2	3	4	5	6	7	8	9	10	11	Final
Denmark (Stjerne) 🔨	2	0	1	0	0	0	0	1	0	1	0	5
United States (Fenson)	0	0	0	0	1	1	1	0	2	0	1	6

Sheet C	1	2	3	4	5	6	7	8	9	10	Final
Sweden (Eriksson) 🔨	1	1	0	1	1	1	0	0	1	X	6
Canada (Koe)	0	0	1	0	0	0	0	1	0	X	2

Sheet D	1	2	3	4	5	6	7	8	9	10	Final
Norway (Ulsrud) 🔨	3	0	5	1	0	2	X	X	X	X	11
Russia (Arkhipov)	0	1	0	0	1	0	X	X	X	X	2

=== Draw 15 ===
Thursday, April 3, 9:00

Sheet A	1	2	3	4	5	6	7	8	9	10	Final
United States (Fenson) 🔨	1	0	0	2	0	0	1	0	0	X	4
Norway (Ulsrud)	0	3	0	0	0	2	0	1	0	X	6

Sheet B	1	2	3	4	5	6	7	8	9	10	Final
Germany (Jahr)	0	0	1	0	3	1	0	X	X	X	5
Canada (Koe) 🔨	1	4	0	4	0	0	2	X	X	X	11

Sheet C	1	2	3	4	5	6	7	8	9	10	Final
Denmark (Stjerne) 🔨	1	0	1	0	1	0	1	0	1	0	5
Russia (Arkhipov)	0	1	0	1	0	1	0	1	0	2	6

Sheet D	1	2	3	4	5	6	7	8	9	10	Final
Sweden (Eriksson)	1	0	3	0	0	2	2	3	X	X	11
Japan (Morozumi) 🔨	0	1	0	1	2	0	0	0	X	X	4

=== Draw 16 ===
Thursday, April 3, 14:00

Sheet A	1	2	3	4	5	6	7	8	9	10	Final
Scotland (MacDonald)	0	1	0	0	1	0	2	0	1	0	5
Canada (Koe) 🔨	1	0	0	1	0	2	0	2	0	1	7

Sheet B	1	2	3	4	5	6	7	8	9	10	11	Final
Norway (Ulsrud) 🔨	1	1	0	0	2	1	0	0	1	0	1	7
Switzerland (de Cruz)	0	0	0	1	0	0	2	1	0	2	0	6

Sheet C	1	2	3	4	5	6	7	8	9	10	Final
Japan (Morozumi)	0	0	0	1	0	1	0	2	0	X	4
China (Liu) 🔨	2	1	0	0	1	0	1	0	1	X	6

Sheet D	1	2	3	4	5	6	7	8	9	10	Final
Czech Republic (Snítil) 🔨	2	0	0	2	0	2	0	1	0	1	8
Denmark (Stjerne)	0	2	0	0	2	0	1	0	2	0	7

=== Draw 17 ===
Thursday, April 3, 19:00

Sheet A	1	2	3	4	5	6	7	8	9	10	Final
Russia (Arkhipov)	0	0	1	1	0	2	0	2	0	X	6
Czech Republic (Snítil) 🔨	2	3	0	0	0	0	1	0	4	X	10

Sheet B	1	2	3	4	5	6	7	8	9	10	Final
China (Liu) 🔨	1	0	0	0	0	1	0	0	2	1	5
Sweden (Eriksson)	0	2	0	1	2	0	0	1	0	0	6

Sheet C	1	2	3	4	5	6	7	8	9	10	Final
Switzerland (de Cruz) 🔨	0	0	2	0	0	3	0	2	0	1	8
United States (Fenson)	0	0	0	1	1	0	1	0	2	0	5

Sheet D	1	2	3	4	5	6	7	8	9	10	Final
Scotland (MacDonald) 🔨	0	1	0	0	2	0	0	X	X	X	3
Germany (Jahr)	1	0	5	0	0	2	2	X	X	X	10

== Tiebreaker ==
Friday, April 4, 9:00

Sheet A	1	2	3	4	5	6	7	8	9	10	Final
Sweden (Eriksson) 🔨	2	0	1	0	2	0	3	0	0	0	8
Japan (Morozumi)	0	2	0	1	0	1	0	1	1	1	7

Player percentages
Sweden		Japan	
Christoffer Sundgren	80%	Kosuke Morozumi	74%
Markus Eriksson	86%	Tetsuro Shimizu	74%
Kristian Lindström	88%	Tsuyoshi Yamaguchi	64%
Oskar Eriksson	74%	Yusuke Morozumi	78%
Total	82%	Total	72%

== Playoffs ==
Page playoff system
1	Norway	3
2	Canada	2
3	Switzerland	2
4	Sweden	5

Semifinal
2	Canada	8
4	Sweden	10

Final
1	Norway	8
4	Sweden	3

Bronze medal game
2	Canada	5
3	Switzerland	7

=== 1 vs. 2 ===
Saturday, April 5, 11:00

Sheet C	1	2	3	4	5	6	7	8	9	10	Final
Norway (Ulsrud) 🔨	1	0	0	0	0	0	1	0	0	1	3
Canada (Koe)	0	0	0	1	0	0	0	0	1	0	2

Player percentages
Norway		Canada	
Håvard Vad Petersson	66%	Nolan Thiessen	74%
Christoffer Svae	79%	Carter Rycroft	81%
Torger Nergård	83%	Pat Simmons	80%
Thomas Ulsrud	91%	Kevin Koe	89%
Total	80%	Total	81%

=== 3 vs. 4 ===
Friday, April 4, 19:00

Sheet C	1	2	3	4	5	6	7	8	9	10	Final
Switzerland (de Cruz) 🔨	1	0	0	0	0	0	1	0	0	X	2
Sweden (Eriksson)	0	2	0	2	0	0	0	0	1	X	5

Player percentages
Switzerland		Sweden	
Valentin Tanner	89%	Christoffer Sundgren	82%
Dominik Märki	86%	Markus Eriksson	90%
Peter de Cruz	94%	Kristian Lindström	88%
Benoît Schwarz	78%	Oskar Eriksson	89%
Total	87%	Total	87%

=== Semifinal ===
Saturday, April 5, 16:00

Sheet C	1	2	3	4	5	6	7	8	9	10	Final
Canada (Koe) 🔨	2	0	1	0	1	0	2	1	0	1	8
Sweden (Eriksson)	0	4	0	1	0	3	0	0	2	0	10

Player percentages
Canada		Sweden	
Nolan Thiessen	98%	Christoffer Sundgren	92%
Carter Rycroft	84%	Markus Eriksson	95%
Pat Simmons	91%	Kristian Lindström	85%
Kevin Koe	83%	Oskar Eriksson	85%
Total	89%	Total	89%

=== Bronze medal game ===
Sunday, April 6, 10:00

Sheet C	1	2	3	4	5	6	7	8	9	10	Final
Canada (Koe) 🔨	0	0	2	0	1	0	0	1	0	1	5
Switzerland (de Cruz)	1	1	0	1	0	2	0	0	2	0	7

Player percentages
Canada		Switzerland	
Nolan Thiessen	89%	Valentin Tanner	93%
Carter Rycroft	85%	Dominik Märki	75%
Pat Simmons	91%	Peter de Cruz	91%
Kevin Koe	72%	Benoît Schwarz	80%
Total	84%	Total	85%

=== Final ===
Sunday, April 6, 15:00

Sheet C	1	2	3	4	5	6	7	8	9	10	Final
Norway (Ulsrud) 🔨	1	1	2	1	0	1	0	2	X	X	8
Sweden (Eriksson)	0	0	0	0	1	0	2	0	X	X	3

Player percentages
Norway		Sweden	
Håvard Vad Petersson	79%	Christoffer Sundgren	92%
Christoffer Svae	81%	Markus Eriksson	86%
Torger Nergård	91%	Kristian Lindström	84%
Thomas Ulsrud	84%	Oskar Eriksson	56%
Total	84%	Total	80%

2014 World Men's Curling Championship winner
(Norway)
Norway
4th title

== Statistics ==
=== Top 5 player percentages ===
Round robin only

Leads	%
(Canada) Nolan Thiessen	87
(Norway) Håvard Vad Petersson	86
(China) Zang Jialiang	86
(United States) Ryan Brunt	86
(Sweden) Christoffer Sundgren	84

Seconds	%
(Canada) Carter Rycroft	86
(Norway) Christoffer Svae	84
(United States) Joe Polo	84
(Japan) Tetsuro Shimizu	83
(China) Ba Dexin	82

Thirds	%
(Norway) Torger Nergård	88
(Canada) Pat Simmons	84
(Denmark) Johnny Frederiksen	82
(China) Xu Xiaoming	82
(Japan) Tsuyoshi Yamaguchi	82

Skips	%
(Norway) Thomas Ulsrud	89
(Canada) Kevin Koe	84
(Sweden) Oskar Eriksson	80
(Germany) Felix Schulze (Fourth)	79
(Japan) Yusuke Morozumi	79
