= Henrik Leek =

Swedish curler

- Curler
- Born: 15 March 1990 (age 36); Härnösand, Sweden

Team
- Curling club: Sundbybergs CK, Sundbyberg, SWE
- Skip: Niklas Edin
- Third: Oskar Eriksson
- Second: Rasmus Wranå
- Lead: Christoffer Sundgren
- Alternate: Henrik Leek

Curling career
- World Championship: 4 (2015, 2016, 2017, 2018)
- European Championship: 4 (2014, 2015, 2016, 2017)
- Olympic: 1 (2018)
Medal record
Men's curling
Representing Sweden
Olympic Games
Silver medal – second place	2018 Pyeongchang	Team
World Championships
Gold medal – first place	2015 Halifax
Gold medal – first place	2018 Las Vegas
Silver medal – second place	2017 Edmonton
European Championships
Gold medal – first place	2014 Champéry
Gold medal – first place	2015 Esbjerg
Gold medal – first place	2016 Renfrewshire
Gold medal – first place	2017 St Gallen
World Junior Championships
Gold medal – first place	2011 Perth

Henrik Leek (born 15 March 1990) is a Swedish curler. As the alternate for the Swedish national curling team, he was the silver medalist at 2018 Winter Olympics, two-time World champion (2015, 2018) and four-time European champion (2014, 2015, 2016, 2017). He also won a gold medal with the Swedish team at the 2011 World Junior Curling Championships.

== Personal life ==
Leek works as a project leader.
