= 2011 World Junior Curling Championships =

- Host city: Perth, Scotland
- Arena: Dewars Centre
- Dates: 5–13 March
- Men's winner: Sweden
- Skip: Oskar Eriksson
- Fourth: Kristian Lindström
- Second: Henrik Leek
- Lead: Alexander Lindström
- Alternate: Christoffer Sundgren
- Finalist: Switzerland (Peter de Cruz)
- Women's winner: Scotland
- Skip: Eve Muirhead
- Third: Anna Sloan
- Second: Vicki Adams
- Lead: Rhiann Macleod
- Alternate: Alice Spence
- Finalist: Canada (Trish Paulsen)

The 2011 World Junior Curling Championships were held from 5 to 13 March at the Dewars Centre in Perth, Scotland. In the men's tournament, Sweden's Oskar Eriksson won the final 6-5 over Switzerland's Peter de Cruz, while Scotland's Eve Muirhead won 10-3 in the final over Canada's Trish Paulsen in the women's tournament.

== Men ==
=== Teams ===
Country	Skip	Third	Second	Lead	Alternate
Canada	Braeden Moskowy	Kirk Muyres	Colton Flasch	Matt Lang	Regis Neumeier
China	Huang Jihui	Ba Dexin	Ma Xiuyue	Wang Jinbo	Zhang Rongrui
Czech Republic	Lukas Klima	Marek Cernovský	Samuel Mokris	Karel Klima	Jakub Splavec
Denmark	Mads Nørgaard	Daniel Poulsen	Michael Hørmark	Nikolaj Maegaard	Alexander Behrndtz
Finland	Iiro Sipola	Oskar Ainola	Esko Sinisalo	Toni Ylhäinen	Niklas Malmi
Norway	Steffen Mellemseter	Markus Snøve Høiberg	Magnus Nedregotten	Sander Rølvåg	Eirik Mjøen
Scotland	John Penny	Colin Dick	Colin Howden	Billy Morton	Jay McWilliam
Sweden	Kristian Lindström	Oskar Eriksson (skip)	Henrik Leek	Alexander Lindström	Christoffer Sundgren
Switzerland	Benoît Schwarz	Peter de Cruz (skip)	Roger Gulka	Valentin Tanner	Dominik Märki
United States	Aaron Wald	Joshua Bahr	Jared Zezel	John Muller	John Landsteiner

=== Standings ===
Country	W	L
Sweden	8	1
Switzerland	7	2
Norway	6	3
Canada	6	3
Scotland	5	4
China	4	5
United States	4	5
Finland	3	6
Denmark	1	8
Czech Republic	1	8

=== Round robin ===
==== Draw 1 ====
Saturday 5 March, 9:00

Sheet A	1	2	3	4	5	6	7	8	9	10	Final
Denmark (Nørgaard)	0	0	0	0	1	0	0	0	1	X	2
China (Huang) 🔨	0	2	2	0	0	2	0	3	0	X	9

Sheet B	1	2	3	4	5	6	7	8	9	10	11	Final
Canada (Moskowy) 🔨	2	0	2	1	0	0	1	0	0	1	0	7
Norway (Mellemseter)	0	2	0	0	1	1	0	3	0	0	2	9

Sheet C	1	2	3	4	5	6	7	8	9	10	Final
Scotland (Penny)	0	1	1	0	0	2	2	0	2	X	8
Finland (Sipola) 🔨	1	0	0	1	1	0	0	1	0	X	4

Sheet D	1	2	3	4	5	6	7	8	9	10	11	Final
Sweden (Eriksson) 🔨	2	0	0	2	1	0	0	0	0	1	0	6
Switzerland (de Cruz)	0	3	0	0	0	0	2	0	1	0	1	7

Sheet E	1	2	3	4	5	6	7	8	9	10	Final
United States (Wald)	0	1	0	0	2	2	0	1	2	X	8
Czech Republic (Klima) 🔨	1	0	0	1	0	0	1	0	0	X	3

==== Draw 2 ====
Saturday 5 March, 19:00

Sheet A	1	2	3	4	5	6	7	8	9	10	Final
Switzerland (de Cruz) 🔨	1	0	2	0	1	0	1	0	1	0	6
Scotland (Penny)	0	1	0	2	0	2	0	1	0	1	7

Sheet B	1	2	3	4	5	6	7	8	9	10	Final
Finland (Sipola) 🔨	0	3	0	2	0	1	1	0	1	1	9
China (Huang)	0	0	0	0	2	0	0	4	0	0	6

Sheet C	1	2	3	4	5	6	7	8	9	10	Final
Czech Republic (Klima) 🔨	1	0	0	1	0	1	0	0	0	X	3
Denmark (Nørgaard)	0	1	0	0	2	0	2	1	2	X	8

Sheet D	1	2	3	4	5	6	7	8	9	10	Final
Norway (Mellemseter) 🔨	0	0	0	3	2	0	4	X	X	X	9
United States (Wald)	0	1	0	0	0	2	0	X	X	X	3

Sheet E	1	2	3	4	5	6	7	8	9	10	Final
Canada (Moskowy) 🔨	1	0	1	0	1	1	0	1	0	0	5
Sweden (Eriksson)	0	2	0	1	0	0	1	0	1	1	6

==== Draw 3 ====
Sunday 6 March, 14:00

Sheet A	1	2	3	4	5	6	7	8	9	10	Final
Norway (Mellemseter) 🔨	0	3	0	0	1	0	0	3	0	X	7
Czech Republic (Klima)	0	0	1	1	0	0	0	0	1	X	3

Sheet B	1	2	3	4	5	6	7	8	9	10	Final
United States (Wald) 🔨	0	0	0	1	0	0	0	X	X	X	1
Sweden (Eriksson)	2	1	5	0	1	0	1	X	X	X	10

Sheet C	1	2	3	4	5	6	7	8	9	10	Final
Canada (Moskowy) 🔨	1	0	1	0	2	0	1	0	2	0	7
Switzerland (de Cruz)	0	3	0	2	0	1	0	2	0	1	9

Sheet D	1	2	3	4	5	6	7	8	9	10	Final
Scotland (Penny)	0	0	0	3	0	0	0	1	0	0	4
China (Huang) 🔨	0	0	1	0	0	2	1	0	0	1	5

Sheet E	1	2	3	4	5	6	7	8	9	10	11	Final
Denmark (Nørgaard)	1	0	0	2	1	0	2	0	0	0	0	6
Finland (Sipola) 🔨	0	2	0	0	0	2	0	2	0	0	2	8

==== Draw 4 ====
Monday 7 March, 9:00

Sheet A	1	2	3	4	5	6	7	8	9	10	Final
United States (Wald)	1	0	0	0	1	0	X	X	X	X	2
Canada (Moskowy) 🔨	0	3	1	1	0	4	X	X	X	X	9

Sheet B	1	2	3	4	5	6	7	8	9	10	Final
Denmark (Nørgaard) 🔨	1	0	0	0	3	0	0	1	0	0	5
Scotland (Penny)	0	0	2	2	0	1	1	0	0	1	7

Sheet C	1	2	3	4	5	6	7	8	9	10	Final
Norway (Mellemseter) 🔨	1	0	0	1	0	1	0	2	0	X	5
Sweden (Eriksson)	0	2	1	0	2	0	1	0	2	X	8

Sheet D	1	2	3	4	5	6	7	8	9	10	Final
Finland (Sipola)	1	0	0	0	0	0	3	0	1	1	6
Czech Republic (Klima) 🔨	0	2	0	0	1	0	0	1	0	0	4

Sheet E	1	2	3	4	5	6	7	8	9	10	Final
China (Huang)	1	0	1	1	3	0	0	1	0	2	9
Switzerland (de Cruz) 🔨	0	1	0	0	0	1	3	0	1	0	6

==== Draw 5 ====
Monday 7 March, 19:00

Sheet A	1	2	3	4	5	6	7	8	9	10	Final
Sweden (Eriksson)	0	4	3	0	0	3	X	X	X	X	10
Denmark (Nørgaard) 🔨	2	0	0	0	1	0	X	X	X	X	3

Sheet B	1	2	3	4	5	6	7	8	9	10	Final
Switzerland (de Cruz) 🔨	3	0	2	0	0	0	2	0	0	X	7
United States (Wald)	0	1	0	0	0	1	0	1	1	X	4

Sheet C	1	2	3	4	5	6	7	8	9	10	Final
China (Huang)	0	0	0	2	0	0	2	1	0	0	5
Czech Republic (Klima) 🔨	0	1	2	0	1	1	0	0	0	1	6

Sheet D	1	2	3	4	5	6	7	8	9	10	Final
Canada (Moskowy) 🔨	2	0	3	0	2	0	3	0	X	X	10
Scotland (Penny)	0	0	0	3	0	1	0	1	X	X	5

Sheet E	1	2	3	4	5	6	7	8	9	10	Final
Finland (Sipola)	0	2	0	0	1	1	0	1	X	X	5
Norway (Mellemseter) 🔨	5	0	0	1	0	0	3	0	X	X	9

==== Draw 6 ====
Tuesday 8 March, 14:00

Sheet A	1	2	3	4	5	6	7	8	9	10	Final
Czech Republic (Klima)	0	0	0	1	0	1	0	2	0	X	4
Switzerland (de Cruz) 🔨	2	0	0	0	1	0	1	0	2	X	6

Sheet B	1	2	3	4	5	6	7	8	9	10	Final
Sweden (Eriksson) 🔨	1	0	0	2	1	0	1	2	X	X	7
Finland (Sipola)	0	0	1	0	0	1	0	0	X	X	2

Sheet C	1	2	3	4	5	6	7	8	9	10	Final
Denmark (Nørgaard)	0	0	0	0	1	0	X	X	X	X	1
Canada (Moskowy) 🔨	2	2	1	0	0	3	X	X	X	X	8

Sheet D	1	2	3	4	5	6	7	8	9	10	11	Final
China (Huang) 🔨	1	0	0	1	0	0	0	3	0	0	1	6
Norway (Mellemseter)	0	2	0	0	0	1	1	0	0	1	0	5

Sheet E	1	2	3	4	5	6	7	8	9	10	Final
Scotland (Penny) 🔨	2	0	0	0	2	0	2	2	0	X	8
United States (Wald)	0	3	0	0	0	0	0	0	1	X	4

==== Draw 7 ====
Wednesday 9 March, 9:00

Sheet A	1	2	3	4	5	6	7	8	9	10	Final
Canada (Moskowy) 🔨	3	0	0	0	5	0	0	0	3	X	11
Finland (Sipola)	0	2	2	0	0	0	2	1	0	X	7

Sheet B	1	2	3	4	5	6	7	8	9	10	Final
Scotland (Penny)	0	2	1	0	3	0	2	1	0	X	9
Czech Republic (Klima) 🔨	1	0	0	3	0	2	0	0	1	X	7

Sheet C	1	2	3	4	5	6	7	8	9	10	Final
Switzerland (de Cruz) 🔨	0	2	1	0	1	2	0	1	1	X	8
Norway (Mellemseter)	1	0	0	1	0	0	1	0	0	X	3

Sheet D	1	2	3	4	5	6	7	8	9	10	Final
United States (Wald) 🔨	0	2	0	2	0	0	3	0	0	1	8
Denmark (Nørgaard)	0	0	3	0	0	2	0	0	1	0	6

Sheet E	1	2	3	4	5	6	7	8	9	10	Final
Sweden (Eriksson)	1	0	2	0	0	3	0	0	2	X	8
China (Huang) 🔨	0	1	0	1	0	0	0	1	0	X	3

==== Draw 8 ====
Wednesday 9 March, 19:00

Sheet A	1	2	3	4	5	6	7	8	9	10	Final
Scotland (Penny)	0	1	1	0	0	0	2	0	2	0	6
Norway (Mellemseter) 🔨	0	0	0	2	1	2	0	2	0	1	8

Sheet B	1	2	3	4	5	6	7	8	9	10	Final
China (Huang)	0	0	0	0	1	0	1	0	X	X	2
Canada (Moskowy) 🔨	2	2	2	0	0	1	0	0	X	X	7

Sheet C	1	2	3	4	5	6	7	8	9	10	Final
Finland (Sipola) 🔨	0	1	0	0	0	0	0	0	0	X	1
United States (Wald)	0	0	2	1	0	1	1	0	0	X	5

Sheet D	1	2	3	4	5	6	7	8	9	10	Final
Czech Republic (Klima)	0	0	2	0	0	1	0	0	0	1	4
Sweden (Eriksson) 🔨	2	1	0	0	2	0	0	0	1	0	6

Sheet E	1	2	3	4	5	6	7	8	9	10	Final
Switzerland (de Cruz) 🔨	2	0	0	2	1	0	0	X	X	X	5
Denmark (Nørgaard)	0	0	1	0	0	0	1	X	X	X	2

==== Draw 9 ====
Thursday 10 March, 12:30

Sheet A	1	2	3	4	5	6	7	8	9	10	Final
China (Huang) 🔨	0	1	0	0	1	0	1	0	1	X	4
United States (Wald)	0	0	2	1	0	2	0	1	0	X	6

Sheet B	1	2	3	4	5	6	7	8	9	10	Final
Norway (Mellemseter)	1	0	0	1	1	2	1	X	X	X	6
Denmark (Nørgaard) 🔨	0	1	1	0	0	0	0	X	X	X	2

Sheet C	1	2	3	4	5	6	7	8	9	10	Final
Sweden (Eriksson)	0	0	0	1	0	0	0	1	0	2	4
Scotland (Penny) 🔨	0	1	0	0	1	0	0	0	1	0	3

Sheet D	1	2	3	4	5	6	7	8	9	10	Final
Switzerland (de Cruz)	1	1	1	0	4	1	0	X	X	X	8
Finland (Sipola) 🔨	0	0	0	2	0	0	1	X	X	X	3

Sheet E	1	2	3	4	5	6	7	8	9	10	Final
Czech Republic (Klima) 🔨	0	0	2	0	0	1	1	0	0	X	4
Canada (Moskowy)	1	1	0	1	1	0	0	2	1	X	7

=== Challenge Game ===
Sheet A	1	2	3	4	5	6	7	8	9	10	Final
Denmark (Nørgaard)	0	2	0	0	0	1	0	1	1	0	5
Czech Republic (Klima) 🔨	2	0	0	1	0	0	1	0	0	2	6

Winner advances to 2012 World Junior Curling Championships; Loser relegated to 2012 European Junior Curling Challenge.

=== Playoffs ===
Page playoff system
1	Sweden	7
2	Switzerland	5
3	Norway	4
4	Canada	10

Semifinal
2	Switzerland	6
4	Canada	5

Gold-medal game
1	Sweden	6
2	Switzerland	5

Bronze-medal game
4	Canada	2
3	Norway	10

==== 1 vs. 2 ====
Friday 11 March, 19:00

Sheet C	1	2	3	4	5	6	7	8	9	10	Final
Sweden (Eriksson) 🔨	0	2	1	0	1	0	2	0	1	0	7
Switzerland (de Cruz)	0	0	0	1	0	2	0	0	0	2	5

==== 3 vs. 4 ====
Friday 11 March, 19:00

Sheet B	1	2	3	4	5	6	7	8	9	10	Final
Norway (Mellemseter) 🔨	0	1	0	1	1	0	1	0	0	X	4
Canada (Moskowy)	0	0	1	0	0	4	0	3	2	X	10

==== Semifinal ====
Saturday 12 March, 18:00

Sheet C	1	2	3	4	5	6	7	8	9	10	Final
Switzerland (de Cruz) 🔨	0	0	2	0	2	0	0	1	0	1	6
Canada (Moskowy)	0	1	0	1	0	0	2	0	1	0	5

==== Bronze-medal game ====
Sunday 13 March, 9:00

Sheet B	1	2	3	4	5	6	7	8	9	10	Final
Canada (Moskowy) 🔨	0	0	0	1	0	1	0	0	X	X	2
Norway (Mellemseter)	1	2	1	0	3	0	2	1	X	X	10

==== Final ====
Sunday 13 March, 9:00

Sheet C	1	2	3	4	5	6	7	8	9	10	Final
Sweden (Eriksson) 🔨	0	1	1	0	1	0	2	1	0	0	6
Switzerland (de Cruz)	1	0	0	2	0	1	0	0	1	0	5

== Women ==
=== Teams ===
Country	Skip	Third	Second	Lead	Alternate
Canada	Trish Paulsen	Kari Kennedy	Kari Paulsen	Natalie Yanko	Dailene Sivertson
Czech Republic	Anna Kubeskova	Tereza Pliskova	Paula Proksikova	Eliska Jalovcova	Martina Strnadová
France	Anna Li	Clémence Gainet	Salomé Bourny	Emma Ferrari	
Japan	Sayaka Yoshimura	Rina Ida	Risa Ujihara	Mao Ishigaki	Nanami Ohmiya
Norway	Kristine Davanger	Pia Trulsen	Nora Hilding	Julie Kjær Molnar	Marie Odnes
Russia	Anna Sidorova	Olga Zyablikova	Ekaterina Antonova	Galina Arsenkina	Viktoriia Moiseeva
Scotland	Eve Muirhead	Anna Sloan	Vicki Adams	Rhiann Macleod	Alice Spence
Sweden	Jonna McManus	Sara McManus	Anna Huhta	Sofia Mabergs	Rosalie Egli
Switzerland	Manuela Siegrist	Briar Hürlimann	Claudia Hug	Janine Wyss	Alina Pätz
United States	Rebecca Hamilton	Tara Peterson	Karlie Koenig	Sophie Brorson	Rebecca Funk

=== Round-robin standings ===
Final round-robin standings

Key
Teams to Playoffs
Teams to Tiebreakers

Country	W	L
Scotland	7	2
Russia	7	2
United States	5	4
Switzerland	5	4
Sweden	5	4
Canada	5	4
Norway	4	5
Japan	3	6
Czech Republic	3	6
France	1	8

=== Round robin ===
==== Draw 1 ====
Saturday 5 March, 14:00

Sheet A	1	2	3	4	5	6	7	8	9	10	Final
Czech Republic (Kubeskova)	0	1	0	1	0	0	2	0	0	1	5
Japan (Yoshimura) 🔨	1	0	0	0	2	1	0	3	0	0	7

Sheet B	1	2	3	4	5	6	7	8	9	10	Final
France (Li) 🔨	1	0	0	0	0	1	0	0	X	X	2
United States (Hamilton)	0	2	1	5	1	0	2	1	X	X	12

Sheet C	1	2	3	4	5	6	7	8	9	10	Final
Canada (Paulsen)	0	0	1	0	0	1	0	0	X	X	2
Sweden (McManus) 🔨	1	0	0	1	1	0	5	1	X	X	9

Sheet D	1	2	3	4	5	6	7	8	9	10	Final
Scotland (Muirhead) 🔨	1	0	1	1	0	3	0	4	X	X	10
Norway (Davanger)	0	1	0	0	1	0	0	0	X	X	2

Sheet E	1	2	3	4	5	6	7	8	9	10	Final
Switzerland (Siegrist)	0	0	0	1	0	0	0	2	0	0	3
Russia (Sidorova) 🔨	1	1	0	0	1	0	0	0	2	2	7

==== Draw 2 ====
Sunday 6 March, 9:00

Sheet A	1	2	3	4	5	6	7	8	9	10	Final
Norway (Davanger) 🔨	0	1	0	1	1	1	0	0	0	X	4
Canada (Paulsen)	2	0	1	0	0	0	1	2	4	X	10

Sheet B	1	2	3	4	5	6	7	8	9	10	Final
Sweden (McManus) 🔨	1	2	0	0	1	0	1	0	2	0	7
Japan (Yoshimura)	0	0	2	0	0	1	0	2	0	1	6

Sheet C	1	2	3	4	5	6	7	8	9	10	Final
Russia (Sidorova) 🔨	1	0	2	0	1	3	0	2	0	X	9
Czech Republic (Kubeskova)	0	0	0	1	0	0	3	0	2	X	6

Sheet D	1	2	3	4	5	6	7	8	9	10	Final
United States (Hamilton)	0	0	4	0	2	0	1	0	3	X	10
Switzerland (Siegrist) 🔨	4	0	0	1	0	1	0	2	0	X	8

Sheet E	1	2	3	4	5	6	7	8	9	10	Final
France (Li)	0	0	0	0	0	0	X	X	X	X	0
Scotland (Muirhead) 🔨	1	1	1	2	3	4	X	X	X	X	12

==== Draw 3 ====
Sunday 6 March, 19:00

Sheet A	1	2	3	4	5	6	7	8	9	10	Final
United States (Hamilton)	0	0	0	0	1	0	0	1	0	X	2
Russia (Sidorova) 🔨	0	0	1	0	0	1	1	0	2	X	5

Sheet B	1	2	3	4	5	6	7	8	9	10	Final
Switzerland (Siegrist)	0	1	0	0	2	0	1	0	0	X	4
Scotland (Muirhead) 🔨	0	0	2	3	0	1	0	0	4	X	10

Sheet C	1	2	3	4	5	6	7	8	9	10	Final
France (Li) 🔨	0	2	0	0	0	0	X	X	X	X	2
Norway (Davanger)	1	0	3	1	3	3	X	X	X	X	11

Sheet D	1	2	3	4	5	6	7	8	9	10	Final
Canada (Paulsen) 🔨	1	0	0	2	0	0	1	0	2	0	6
Japan (Yoshimura)	0	0	4	0	1	0	0	1	0	1	7

Sheet E	1	2	3	4	5	6	7	8	9	10	Final
Czech Republic (Kubeskova) 🔨	1	0	2	0	0	1	0	0	2	1	7
Sweden (McManus)	0	1	0	2	3	0	0	2	0	0	8

==== Draw 4 ====
Monday 7 March, 14:00

Sheet A	1	2	3	4	5	6	7	8	9	10	Final
Switzerland (Siegrist)	3	0	0	2	0	0	3	3	X	X	11
France (Li) 🔨	0	0	1	0	0	0	0	0	X	X	1

Sheet B	1	2	3	4	5	6	7	8	9	10	Final
Czech Republic (Kubeskova) 🔨	0	1	0	1	0	1	1	2	0	X	6
Canada (Paulsen)	0	0	1	0	1	0	0	0	2	X	4

Sheet C	1	2	3	4	5	6	7	8	9	10	Final
United States (Hamilton)	0	0	1	0	0	1	0	1	0	X	3
Scotland (Muirhead) 🔨	2	1	0	0	2	0	1	0	2	X	8

Sheet D	1	2	3	4	5	6	7	8	9	10	Final
Sweden (McManus)	0	0	0	1	0	1	0	2	0	X	4
Russia (Sidorova) 🔨	2	1	0	0	1	0	3	0	2	X	9

Sheet E	1	2	3	4	5	6	7	8	9	10	Final
Japan (Yoshimura) 🔨	1	2	1	2	0	0	0	0	1	0	7
Norway (Davanger)	0	0	0	0	1	1	3	1	0	2	8

==== Draw 5 ====
Tuesday 8 March, 9:00

Sheet A	1	2	3	4	5	6	7	8	9	10	Final
Scotland (Muirhead) 🔨	0	0	1	0	1	0	3	0	1	0	6
Czech Republic (Kubeskova)	0	0	0	1	0	1	0	1	0	1	4

Sheet B	1	2	3	4	5	6	7	8	9	10	Final
Norway (Davanger)	0	0	1	3	1	0	2	2	1	X	10
Switzerland (Siegrist) 🔨	2	1	0	0	0	1	0	0	0	X	4

Sheet C	1	2	3	4	5	6	7	8	9	10	Final
Japan (Yoshimura)	0	0	0	0	1	0	0	X	X	X	1
Russia (Sidorova) 🔨	3	1	1	0	0	1	4	X	X	X	10

Sheet D	1	2	3	4	5	6	7	8	9	10	Final
France (Li)	0	0	0	2	1	0	1	0	X	X	4
Canada (Paulsen) 🔨	1	4	2	0	0	2	0	6	X	X	15

Sheet E	1	2	3	4	5	6	7	8	9	10	Final
Sweden (McManus)	0	0	0	1	0	0	0	1	0	X	2
United States (Hamilton) 🔨	0	1	1	0	2	0	1	0	3	X	8

==== Draw 6 ====
Tuesday 8 March, 19:00

Sheet A	1	2	3	4	5	6	7	8	9	10	Final
Russia (Sidorova) 🔨	0	0	1	0	4	1	1	0	2	X	9
Norway (Davanger)	0	0	0	2	0	0	0	1	0	X	3

Sheet B	1	2	3	4	5	6	7	8	9	10	Final
Scotland (Muirhead) 🔨	2	0	0	1	0	0	0	3	0	0	6
Sweden (McManus)	0	0	1	0	0	2	1	0	2	1	7

Sheet C	1	2	3	4	5	6	7	8	9	10	Final
Czech Republic (Kubeskova) 🔨	2	1	2	3	0	3	0	X	X	X	11
France (Li)	0	0	0	0	2	0	1	X	X	X	3

Sheet D	1	2	3	4	5	6	7	8	9	10	11	Final
Japan (Yoshimura)	0	1	2	0	1	0	0	2	0	0	1	7
United States (Hamilton) 🔨	3	0	0	1	0	0	0	0	1	1	0	6

Sheet E	1	2	3	4	5	6	7	8	9	10	Final
Canada (Paulsen)	0	2	0	0	0	0	1	0	X	X	3
Switzerland (Siegrist) 🔨	2	0	1	3	1	1	0	2	X	X	10

==== Draw 7 ====
Wednesday 9 March, 14:00

Sheet A	1	2	3	4	5	6	7	8	9	10	Final
France (Li)	0	0	1	0	1	0	X	X	X	X	2
Sweden (McManus) 🔨	1	1	0	5	0	4	X	X	X	X	11

Sheet B	1	2	3	4	5	6	7	8	9	10	Final
Canada (Paulsen)	0	0	0	0	1	1	0	2	2	0	6
Russia (Sidorova) 🔨	0	0	1	0	0	0	1	0	0	1	3

Sheet C	1	2	3	4	5	6	7	8	9	10	Final
Norway (Davanger) 🔨	1	0	0	0	0	0	0	0	0	X	1
United States (Hamilton)	0	0	1	2	0	1	1	1	1	X	7

Sheet D	1	2	3	4	5	6	7	8	9	10	Final
Switzerland (Siegrist) 🔨	0	0	1	0	1	0	1	0	2	1	6
Czech Republic (Kubeskova)	0	1	0	1	0	0	0	1	0	0	3

Sheet E	1	2	3	4	5	6	7	8	9	10	Final
Scotland (Muirhead)	1	1	0	4	2	0	2	X	X	X	10
Japan (Yoshimura) 🔨	0	0	0	0	0	2	0	X	X	X	2

==== Draw 8 ====
Thursday 10 March, 8:00

Sheet A	1	2	3	4	5	6	7	8	9	10	Final
Canada (Paulsen) 🔨	2	0	1	2	1	0	1	1	X	X	8
United States (Hamilton)	0	0	0	0	0	2	0	0	X	X	2

Sheet B	1	2	3	4	5	6	7	8	9	10	Final
Japan (Yoshimura) 🔨	0	0	3	0	0	2	2	1	1	0	9
France (Li)	2	1	0	1	3	0	0	0	0	3	10

Sheet C	1	2	3	4	5	6	7	8	9	10	Final
Sweden (McManus)	0	1	0	0	0	1	0	1	1	0	4
Switzerland (Siegrist)	1	0	0	2	2	0	0	0	0	1	6

Sheet D	1	2	3	4	5	6	7	8	9	10	Final
Russia (Sidorova) 🔨	0	1	0	0	0	1	1	0	1	0	4
Scotland (Muirhead)	0	0	1	1	0	0	0	3	0	2	7

Sheet E	1	2	3	4	5	6	7	8	9	10	Final
Norway (Davanger)	0	0	1	1	0	1	0	1	1	X	5
Czech Republic (Kubeskova) 🔨	2	2	0	0	1	0	2	0	0	X	7

==== Draw 9 ====
Thursday 10 March, 17:00

Sheet A	1	2	3	4	5	6	7	8	9	10	Final
Japan (Yoshimura)	0	1	0	0	0	1	1	0	1	X	4
Switzerland (Siegrist) 🔨	3	0	0	0	4	0	0	2	0	X	9

Sheet B	1	2	3	4	5	6	7	8	9	10	Final
United States (Hamilton) 🔨	3	0	0	1	0	0	0	1	1	1	7
Czech Republic (Kubeskova)	0	1	4	0	0	0	1	0	0	0	6

Sheet C	1	2	3	4	5	6	7	8	9	10	Final
Scotland (Muirhead) 🔨	1	0	1	0	1	0	1	0	0	0	4
Canada (Paulsen)	0	1	0	2	0	1	0	1	0	1	6

Sheet D	1	2	3	4	5	6	7	8	9	10	Final
Norway (Davanger) 🔨	0	0	2	1	4	0	0	1	0	X	8
Sweden (McManus)	0	1	0	0	0	1	1	0	1	X	4

Sheet E	1	2	3	4	5	6	7	8	9	10	Final
Russia (Sidorova) 🔨	3	1	1	0	2	1	X	X	X	X	8
France (Li)	0	0	0	1	0	0	X	X	X	X	1

=== Tiebreakers ===
Friday 11 March, 14:00

Sheet D	1	2	3	4	5	6	7	8	9	10	Final
United States (Hamilton)	0	0	0	1	0	2	0	0	X	X	3
Canada (Paulsen) 🔨	3	0	2	0	1	0	2	1	X	X	9

Sheet E	1	2	3	4	5	6	7	8	9	10	Final
Switzerland (Siegrist) 🔨	0	1	0	0	0	2	0	1	0	X	4
Sweden (McManus)	0	0	1	1	0	0	3	0	2	X	7

=== Playoffs ===
Page playoff system
1	Scotland	7
2	Russia	6
3	Canada	9
4	Sweden	6

Semifinal
2	Russia	8
3	Canada	9

Gold-medal game
1	Scotland	10
3	Canada	3

Bronze-medal game
2	Russia	9
4	Sweden	3

==== 1 vs. 2 ====
Saturday 12 March, 12:00

Sheet C	1	2	3	4	5	6	7	8	9	10	11	Final
Scotland (Muirhead) 🔨	1	1	0	0	0	2	0	1	1	0	1	7
Russia (Sidorova)	0	0	3	0	1	0	1	0	0	1	0	6

==== 3 vs. 4 ====
Saturday 12 March, 12:00

Sheet B	1	2	3	4	5	6	7	8	9	10	Final
Canada (Paulsen)	0	0	3	0	2	0	2	0	1	1	9
Sweden (McManus) 🔨	0	1	0	2	0	2	0	1	0	0	6

==== Semifinal ====
Saturday 12 March, 18:00

Sheet D	1	2	3	4	5	6	7	8	9	10	Final
Russia (Sidorova)	2	0	1	0	0	1	1	0	2	1	8
Canada (Paulsen)	0	3	0	3	0	0	0	3	0	0	9

==== Bronze-medal game ====
Sunday 13 March, 13:00

Team	1	2	3	4	5	6	7	8	9	10	Final
Russia (Sidorova) 🔨	2	0	2	1	0	2	0	1	1	X	9
Sweden (McManus)	0	1	0	0	2	0	0	0	0	X	3

==== Final ====
Sunday 13 March, 13:00

Sheet C	1	2	3	4	5	6	7	8	9	10	Final
Scotland (Muirhead) 🔨	2	0	1	3	0	2	2	0	X	X	10
Canada (Paulsen)	0	1	0	0	1	0	0	1	X	X	3
