= Alexander Lindström =

Swedish-Norwegian curler

- Curler
- Born: 4 November 1989 (age 37)

Curling career
- World Championship: 1 (2017)
- European Championship: 1 (2026)
Medal record
Curling
Representing Sweden
European Championships
Bronze medal – third place	2026 Ostrava
World Junior Championships
Gold medal – first place	2011 Perth

Alexander Lindström (born 4 November 1989 in Lit, Sweden) is a Swedish-Norwegian curler, from Oslo. He currently coaches the Oskar Eriksson rink.

== Curling career ==
=== Juniors ===
Lindström twice represented Sweden at the World Junior Curling Championships. His first World Juniors was in 2009, throwing second stones for Oskar Eriksson. After posting a 6-3 round robin record, the team would lose in the 3 vs. 4 game and in the bronze medal final, settling for fourth place. Lindström returned to the World Juniors in 2011, playing lead for Eriksson, on a team which included his brother Kristian throwing last rocks. The team would finish the round robin in first place with an 11–1 record. The team then beat Switzerland twice in the playoffs to claim the gold medal.

=== Men's ===
Lindström would move to Norway and would join the Steffen Walstad team at lead. They would qualify for the 2017 World Men's Curling Championship where they would finish in 8th place with a 5–6 record.

== Personal life ==
Lindström works for CSDM Tech. His twin brother Kristian skips his own team in Sweden and formerly played for Niklas Edin rink.
