= Oskar Eriksson =

Swedish curler (born 1991)

- Curler
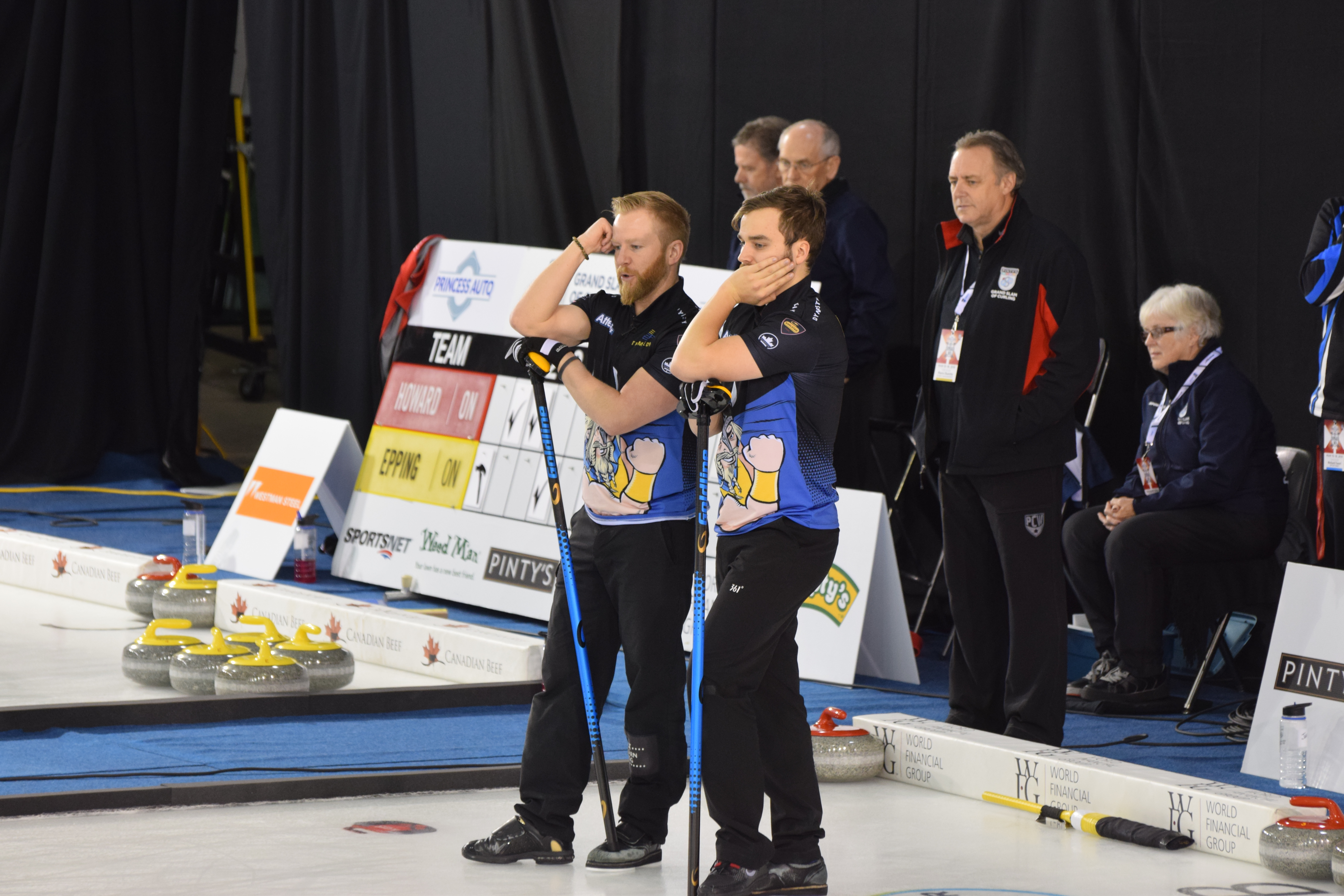
- Edin and Eriksson watch their opponent throw his rock at the 2018 Elite 10 Grand Slam curling event in Winnipeg, Manitoba
- Born: 29 May 1991 (age 35); Karlstad, Sweden

Team
- Curling club: Karlstads CK, Karlstad, SWE
- Skip: Oskar Eriksson
- Third: Rasmus Wranå
- Second: Simon Olofsson
- Lead: Christoffer Sundgren
- Mixed doubles partner: Anna Hasselborg

Curling career
- Member Association: Sweden
- World Championship: 15 (2011, 2012, 2013, 2014, 2015, 2016, 2017, 2018, 2019, 2021, 2022, 2023, 2024, 2025, 2026)
- World Mixed Doubles Championship: 3 (2019, 2021, 2025)
- European Championship: 17 (2009, 2010, 2011, 2012, 2013, 2014, 2015, 2016, 2017, 2018, 2019, 2021, 2022, 2023, 2024, 2025, 2026)
- Olympic: 5 (2010, 2014, 2018, 2022, 2026)
- Grand Slam victories: 4 (2016 Masters, 2016 Tour Challenge, 2017 Players', 2022 Tour Challenge)
Medal record
Men's curling
Representing Sweden
Olympic Games
| Gold medal – first place | 2022 Beijing | Team |
| Silver medal – second place | 2018 Pyeongchang | Team |
| Bronze medal – third place | 2014 Sochi | Team |
| Bronze medal – third place | 2022 Beijing | Mixed doubles |
World Championships
| Gold medal – first place | 2013 Victoria |
| Gold medal – first place | 2015 Halifax |
| Gold medal – first place | 2018 Las Vegas |
| Gold medal – first place | 2019 Lethbridge |
| Gold medal – first place | 2021 Calgary |
| Gold medal – first place | 2022 Las Vegas |
| Gold medal – first place | 2024 Schaffhausen |
| Gold medal – first place | 2026 Ogden |
| Silver medal – second place | 2014 Beijing |
| Silver medal – second place | 2017 Edmonton |
| Bronze medal – third place | 2011 Regina |
| Bronze medal – third place | 2012 Basel |
World Mixed Doubles Championship
| Gold medal – first place | 2019 Stavanger |
| Bronze medal – third place | 2021 Aberdeen |
European Championships
| Gold medal – first place | 2009 Aberdeen |
| Gold medal – first place | 2012 Karlstad |
| Gold medal – first place | 2014 Champéry |
| Gold medal – first place | 2015 Esbjerg |
| Gold medal – first place | 2016 Renfrewshire |
| Gold medal – first place | 2017 St Gallen |
| Gold medal – first place | 2019 Helsingborg |
| Gold medal – first place | 2025 Lohja |
| Silver medal – second place | 2011 Moscow |
| Silver medal – second place | 2018 Tallinn |
| Silver medal – second place | 2021 Lillehammer |
| Silver medal – second place | 2023 Aberdeen |
| Bronze medal – third place | 2026 Ostrava |
Swedish Men's Championship
| Gold medal – first place | 2011 Umeå |
| Gold medal – first place | 2013 Falun |
| Gold medal – first place | 2014 Umeå |
| Gold medal – first place | 2015 Örebro |
| Gold medal – first place | 2016 Piteå |
| Gold medal – first place | 2018 Skellefteå |
| Gold medal – first place | 2019 Jönköping |
| Gold medal – first place | 2020 Jönköping |
| Gold medal – first place | 2023 Karlstad |
| Silver medal – second place | 2012 Östersund |
| Bronze medal – third place | 2009 Östersund |
| Bronze medal – third place | 2010 Karlstad |
Swedish Mixed Doubles Championship
| Gold medal – first place | 2013 Karlstad |
| Gold medal – first place | 2016 Gävle |
| Gold medal – first place | 2017 Norrköping |
| Gold medal – first place | 2019 Karlstad |
| Gold medal – first place | 2021 Jönköping |
World Junior Championships
| Gold medal – first place | 2011 Perth |
| Silver medal – second place | 2008 Östersund |
Winter Universiade
| Gold medal – first place | 2013 Trentino |

Oskar Ingemar Eriksson (born 29 May 1991) is a Swedish curler from Karlstad. He was the longtime third on Team Niklas Edin before taking over the team as skip following Edin's retirement in 2026. He is the first curler in history to win four Olympic medals – gold, silver, and two bronze – and the first to secure two Olympic medals in different curling disciplines in the same Olympic Games. He is also an eight-time World Men's Curling Champion, eight-time European Men's Curling Champion, and the first curler in history to win three gold medals in major international curling championships in a single calendar year – the World Men's Curling Championship, the European Curling Championship, and the World Mixed Doubles Championship. Having also won two World Mixed Doubles Championship medals (gold and bronze), he is the first and the only curler to win eight World Curling Championship gold medals in the senior men's division and has won thirteen World Curling Championship medals overall in that division. He also holds the record for most gold medals in international competitions as recognized by the World Curling Federation. He is the only member of Team Sweden to have competed in all of the World Men's Curling Championships from 2011 to 2026. He won medals in all but four of these championships, as well as playing in multiple positions – as skip (silver, 2014), third (gold, 2015, 2018, 2019, 2021, 2022, 2024 and 2026, and silver, 2017), second (bronze, 2012), and as an alternate (gold, 2013 and bronze, 2011). In 2022, Eriksson and his teammates also became the first men's team in history to win four consecutive World Men's Curling Championships. In 2026, Eriksson and Niklas Edin became the first and only two curlers in history to have eight career gold World Men's Curling Championship medals.

== Career ==
=== Career beginnings ===
Eriksson began curling before he was six years old. He followed his older brothers Anders Eriksson and Markus Eriksson into the sport, but his skill level advanced more rapidly. He was part of a curling team at age seven, debuting in Sweden's Elite Series at the age of thirteen. He won his first Swedish Men's Curling Championship title in his junior career and has gone on to win eight more championship titles since then. As a junior, Eriksson also competed at three World Junior Curling Championships, winning both a gold medal and a silver medal. At those three World Junior Championships, Eriksson skipped two different Swedish teams, winning a total of 24 games and losing only 9.

Eriksson made his first run for a junior world championship title when he was sixteen at the 2008 World Junior Curling Championships, skipping his first team to a silver medal. The team, consisting of Henric Jonsson, Markus Franzén, and Nils Karlsson, lost in the final to the US team skipped by Chris Plys. In 2008, Eriksson moved to Härnosand to join other promising curlers at Härnosands gymnasium. He also joined Team Lit/Lindström, formed by brothers Kristian Lindström and Alexander Lindström, together with Christoffer Sundgren and Henrik Leek. The team immediately succeeded on the junior tour and scored wins in the senior division. With this team, Eriksson made his second run for the gold medal at the 2009 World Junior Curling Championships, but finished in fourth place, losing in the bronze-medal game to the US team that was again skipped by Plys. Though the team did not qualify to compete at the championships in 2010, Eriksson and his teammates finally won a gold medal at the 2011 World Junior Curling Championships, defeating Team Switzerland, skipped by Peter de Cruz, by a score of 6–5 in the final.

By 2012, Eriksson's Lit teammates were no longer eligible for junior competition, but Eriksson was still eligible for junior championships. He skipped Team CK Granit-Gävle, consisting of Ludwig Grann, Erik Ölund, and Magnus Rudström, at the 2012 Swedish Junior Curling Championships with the aim of qualifying for the World Junior Curling Championship. Eriksson's team was undefeated until the finals, but there they came in second place to the team from Sundyberg, skipped by his future teammate Rasmus Wranå, whose team won silver at the 2012 World Junior Curling Championships.

=== Seniors I (2008–2014): Team Lindström/Eriksson and Team Edin ===
Shortly after joining Team Lit in 2008, Eriksson played simultaneously with two teams. His official team during this period was Team Lit, alternatively known as Team Lindström and eventually Team Eriksson. Eriksson skipped the team for most of this period through 2014. In addition to their early tour successes, Team Lit finished second in the standings of the Swedish Men's Curling Championships in 2009, reaching the semifinals, and finished second in their group Division 1 of the Elite series the same year. He competed with a second team, however, from 2009 through February 2014, as he was selected as the alternate for Team Niklas Edin – with Niklas Edin, Sebastian Kraupp, Fredrik Lindberg, and Viktor Kjäll – in all of their international championship appearances. As part of Team Edin, he competed in three World Curling Championships (2011-2013), five European Curling Championships (2009-2013), and the 2010 and 2014 Olympic Games. During this period, however, Team Lit became more competitive with Team Edin and was well recognized as one of the top two men's curling teams in Sweden. While Team Lit came in second to Team Edin in the Elite Series from 2011-2013, Team Lit also won the Swedish Men's Curling Championship in 2011, 2013, and 2014.

As an alternate for Team Edin during this period, Eriksson received numerous international medals, including two gold medals at the European Curling Championships (2009 and 2012) and three World Curling Championship medals, including his first World Championship gold medal (2013) and two bronze medals (2011 and 2012). He played his first full games at a major championship in the senior division at the 2011 European Curling Championships in the final two round-robin draws. At the 2012 World Men's Curling Championship, however, he notably played in the second position for all games except three because Niklas Edin, the permanent skip, was suffering from a herniated disc in his back. Eriksson also played this position in the playoffs, in which Team Sweden won its second World Curling Championship bronze medal. At the 2013 European Curling Championships, he also curled for a third of the round-robin games, playing the second position in the seventh and eighth draws and the third position in the final draw, helping the team secure a winning record, despite not making the playoffs. He also made his first Olympic appearances with Team Edin, coming in fourth in the 2010 Winter Olympics and receiving a bronze medal in the 2014 Winter Olympics.

With his own team, however, Eriksson and his teammates won several international events, including the Oslo Cup (2009), Swiss Cup Basel (2012), and European Masters (2013), as well as the Winter Universiade (2013). In 2012, the team had also relocated to Karlstad, with Markus Eriksson joining the team, following the departure of Leek and Alexander Lindström, and they continued to expand their international competition aims. In the 2013-14 season, Team Eriksson reached second place at the Swiss Cup Basel and the Mercure Perth Masters and competed in Canada on the World Curling Tour, coming in fifth place in three events and reaching their first Grand Slam Quarterfinal at the National. Winning the Swedish Men's Curling Championships that year as well, the team was selected to represent Sweden in the 2014 World Men's Curling Championship in light of their season success, but also because Team Edin had represented Sweden in the European Curling Championships but had not qualified for the playoffs. In their World Curling Championship debut, Team Eriksson reached the final and won the silver medal.

=== Seniors II (2014–present): Team Edin ===
In May 2014, Edin and Team Eriksson agreed to form a new Team Edin, with Edin skipping the team in the fourth position and Oskar Eriksson playing third along with, Kristian Lindström playing second and Christoffer Sundgren in the lead position. From the start, this new Team Edin team immediately saw their increased potential and aimed to become the number one team in the world. When Lindström underwent surgery in 2016 and needed recovery, however, Rasmus Wranå began curling in the second position for the team. With all four players having experience as skips, the Team had rapidly increased success. Indeed, Team Edin was ranked first at the end of the 2016–17 curling season on both lists and finished in first place on the prize money list in the 2017-18 curling season.

With Team Edin, Eriksson has earned multiple major championship medals since the 2014-15 season. At the 2022 Olympics, the team won their first gold medal, winning the silver medal in 2018, and Eriksson and Edin also secured bronze medals under the original Team Edin in 2014. These Olympic medals are the only Olympic medals in men's team curling that Team Sweden has won since the inaugural event in 1924. The team also reached the finals of the European Curling Championships every year since forming a new team, winning gold five times (2014-2017 and 2019) and silver twice (2018 and 2021). Of most significance, perhaps, the relaunched Team Edin secured medals in the finals of the World Curling Championships every year except 2016 and 2023, winning five gold (2015, 2018, 2019, 2021, 2022, and 2024) and one silver (2017), bringing the total for Edin and Eriksson to a record seven World Championship gold medals.

Since the 2014-15 season, Eriksson and his teammates have consistently ranked in the top ten teams in the world since they joined forces due to their performance in Canada and worldwide. The team has reached the playoffs in 37 Grand Slam of Curling Events, 32 of them achieved since Wranå joined the team. Indeed, in the 2016-17 season, Team Edin had their most successful year on tour, winning three Slams (the Masters, the Tour Challenge, and the Players’ Championship) and reaching the finals (the Canadian Open) and semifinals (the National and Champions Cup) of all but one of the slams, securing the Pinty’s Cup, the first non-Canadian men's team to do so. The team finally won their fourth Slam at the 2022 Tour Challenge, with Eriksson skipping the team in the semifinal and final when Edin was injured. The Team has also won several World Curling Tour events, including the Baden Masters (2015, 2017, 2020), Swiss Cup Basel (2016, 2018), Curling Masters Champery (2016, 2017), Perth Masters (2018), and European Masters (2014). Team Edin has also won the Swedish Men's Curling Championships six times between 2014 and 2020, skipping only the 2017 championships to prepare for the World Championships.

The 2023–24 season did not see the team win any tour events, but ended with Edin winning the 2024 World Men's Curling Championship, a historic seventh title for both Edin and Eriksson. However, the team would fail to repeat at the 2025 World Men's Curling Championship, losing to eventual champions Scotland 8–7 in the quarterfinals, finishing 5th. Their finishes at the 2024 and 2025 World Championships however, directly qualified them to represent Sweden at the 2026 Winter Olympics.

==== 2026 Olympics controversy ====
During the 2026 Olympic Games in Italy in their game against Canada, a video showed Canadian third Marc Kennedy touching the granite part of the stone (which is against the rules), while throwing the rock, and subsequently being involved in a verbal altercation with Eriksson, in which Kennedy told him to "fuck off".

The confusion came from World Curling's official rules which allow for "double touches" of the stone's handle before the hog line, but that touching the granite part of the stone (not the handle) is not allowed. World Curling clarified these rules following the game, stating that "[d]uring forward motion, touching the granite of the stone is not allowed. This will result in the stone being removed from play."

Beyond the disputed play, some viewers and experts criticized what they perceived as unsportsmanlike conduct during the on-ice altercation between Kennedy and Eriksson, and after the game. World Curling issued a verbal warning to Canadian officials over inappropriate language used by Kennedy, stating that any further misconduct would lead to additional sanctions. When it was reviewed, it showed that Kennedy was pointing at the rock but not, in fact, touching it.

Following the Canada–Sweden match, Kennedy stated that his only regret was the language that he used. He felt that Sweden had "come up with a plan" to catch hog line violations, as they had used video footage that did not come from the official Olympic Broadcasting Services.

=== Mixed events ===
Eriksson also currently competes in mixed doubles curling and has formerly competed in mixed curling. In mixed curling, his most successful run at the Swedish national championships occurred in 2008, where his team – consisting of Christoffer Sundgren, Maria Östman, and Marina Stener – reached second place, losing to the team of Niklas Edin, Anette Norberg, Eric Carlsén, and Anna Hasselborg. His last appearance in the Swedish national mixed championships was in 2012 when he curled with Hasselborg, Kristian Lindström, and Marina Stener. Since then, outside of playing men's team curling, he has participated mostly in mixed doubles. He has continued to play mixed curling, primarily in the Continental Cup.

Eriksson's longest-running mixed doubles partnership is with Anna Hasselborg, with whom he began curling at Härnosands gymnasium. The pair went on to compete in the Swedish Mixed Doubles Curling Championship four times, winning the event each time that they entered (2013, 2016, 2017, and 2019). Despite Hasselborg and Eriksson's victories, longtime mixed doubles specialists Per Noreen and Camilla Noreen were selected to represent Sweden in the World Mixed Doubles Curling Championships in 2016 and 2017, but unfortunately were unable to earn Team Sweden a spot in the Olympic mixed doubles event. In 2019, however, Hasselborg and Eriksson were selected to represent Sweden in the 2019 World Mixed Doubles Curling Championship, where they won the gold medal over Team Canada in their championship debut. In 2019, they also won their first career mixed doubles tour event at the MadTown DoubleDown mixed doubles tournament.

In the 2020-21 season, the Swedish Curling Association launched a substantial effort to prepare for the 2021 World Mixed Doubles Curling Championship and to qualify for the 2022 Olympics, supporting five teams on the mixed doubles tour. Eriksson was selected for one of the teams, partnering with Almida de Val, as Hasselborg chose not to participate in mixed doubles during the 2020-21 curling season. Eriksson and De Val won their first event as a team at the Oberstdorf International Mixed Doubles Cup in September 2020, then reached the quarterfinals of the Mixed Doubles Bern championship. In 2021, Eriksson and de Val won the Swedish Mixed Doubles Curling Championship, giving Eriksson the distinction of being the only Swedish curler to win the national mixed doubles title five times. On 1 March 2021, the Swedish Curling Association formally announced the selection of Eriksson and De Val to represent Sweden at the 2021 World Mixed Doubles Curling Championship. Eriksson and de Val were undefeated in the preliminary rounds and after a tight loss in the semifinal won the bronze medal, defeating Kerri Einarson an Brad Gushue. At the conclusion of the season, Eriksson and de Val were chosen to represent Team Sweden in mixed doubles at the 2022 Winter Olympics.

In the 2021-22 season, de Val and Eriksson played the Aly Jenkins Mixed Doubles Memorial tournament, reaching the semifinal, where the victors were the event champions, Isabella Wranå and Team Edin second Rasmus Wranå. In December 2021, Eriksson and de Val competed in the Gothenburg Mixed Doubles Cup and finished first in the overall standings heading into the playoffs, ultimately winning the silver medal in the tournament. In preparation for the Winter Olympics, De Val and Eriksson had completed an intense training season under controlled conditions, but when one of their coaches tested positive for COVID-19, their arrival in Beijing was delayed until the day before the competition. At the Olympics, the team would qualify for the playoffs, where they would lose in the semifinals to Italy but defeat Great Britain to secure the bronze medal.

== Career milestones and records ==
On the World Curling Federation's list of records, Eriksson is ranked first among gold medal winners in federation-recognized events and is tied for first with Niklas Edin for overall medal wins. As an Olympian, he is the first curler in history to have won four Olympic medals – winning gold (2022), silver (2018), and bronze (2014) medals in team curling, and bronze (2022) in mixed doubles. He holds the most gold medals in the World Curling Championships, winning eight World Men's Curling Championship gold (2013, 2015, 2018, 2019, 2021, 2022, 2024 and 2026) and the World Mixed Doubles Championship gold in 2019. He is also the first and only World Junior Curling Champion to win gold medals in two different disciplines in the senior division. With his eight European Championship Gold Medals, he also holds a record 18 gold medals across the Olympics, World, and European Curling Championships.

Currently, Eriksson is the only Swedish curler to have taken part in fifteen consecutive World Curling Championships in the men's division (2011-2026, with no such event held in 2020). Eriksson has also competed in thirteen consecutive European Curling Championships, winning eight gold medals, a record that he shares only with Niklas Edin. In 2019, Eriksson became the first curler in history to hold three key gold medals in a single calendar year: the World Curling Championship, the European Curling Championship, and the World Mixed Doubles Championship (with Anna Hasselborg). He also has reached 37 playoffs at Grand Slam of Curling events, all but one with Team Edin. and has won four Grand Slam tournaments and the Pinty's Cup. As part of Team Edin, Eriksson and his teammates were the first to win three Slam championships, and they currently hold the record for the non-Canadian teams reaching the Grand Slam playoffs.

As part of Team Edin, Eriksson, Niklas Edin, and Christoffer Sundgren also became the first men's curlers to simultaneously hold the World Curling Championship and European Curling Championship titles in separate calendar years (2015 and 2019). Eriksson and Edin are the first men's curlers to simultaneously hold those same titles in four separate competition seasons (2012–2013, 2014–2015, 2017–2018 and 2025–2026). Eriksson, Edin, and Sundgren are also the first curlers in history on the men's side to win four European Championship gold medals in a row (2014-2017), and with Edin, Sundgren, and Rasmus Wranå, the first curlers to secure four consecutive World Curling Championships (2018, 2019, 2021, and 2022, with no WMCC event in 2020).

Eriksson currently holds the most championship titles in the Swedish Mixed Doubles Curling Championships, with five total (2013, 2016–17, 2019, and 2022) and also ranks second in Swedish Men's Curling Championship history, with nine titles (2011, 2013–16, 2018–20, and 2023), a ranking that he shares only with Peter Narup. Only Peja Lindholm, Tomas Nordin, and Magnus Swartling have more titles, with ten each. In 2012, Eriksson was inducted into the Swedish Curling Hall of Fame.

== Grand Slam record ==
Key
| C | Champion |
| F | Lost in Final |
| SF | Lost in Semifinal |
| QF | Lost in Quarterfinals |
| R16 | Lost in the round of 16 |
| Q | Did not advance to playoffs |
| T2 | Played in Tier 2 event |
| DNP | Did not participate in event |
| N/A | Not a Grand Slam event that season |

| Event | 2013–14 | 2014–15 | 2015–16 | 2016–17 | 2017–18 | 2018–19 | 2019–20 | 2020–21 | 2021–22 | 2022–23 | 2023–24 | 2024–25 | 2025–26 | 2026–27 |
|---|---|---|---|---|---|---|---|---|---|---|---|---|---|---|
| Invitational | N/A | N/A | Q | C | SF | Q | QF | N/A | N/A | C | QF | Q | QF | Q |
| Masters | DNP | Q | QF | C | F | SF | Q | N/A | QF | QF | Q | QF | Q | DNP |
| National | QF | DNP | Q | SF | DNP | QF | F | N/A | QF | F | F | Q | Q | SF |
| Open | Q | Q | QF | F | F | SF | Q | N/A | N/A | F | Q | QF | Q | |
| Players' | DNP | Q | QF | C | F | QF | N/A | QF | F | QF | QF | DNP | Q | |
| Champions Cup | N/A | N/A | QF | SF | Q | SF | N/A | QF | SF | SF | N/A | N/A | N/A | N/A |
| Elite 10 | N/A | F | Q | Q | Q | Q | N/A | N/A | N/A | N/A | N/A | N/A | N/A | N/A |

== Teams ==
| Season | Skip/Fourth | Third | Second | Lead | Alternate | Events |
|---|---|---|---|---|---|---|
| 2005–06 | Anders Eriksson (fourth) | Sebastian Kraupp (skip) | Viktor Kjäll | Oskar Eriksson | | |
| 2006–07 | Oskar Eriksson | Henric Jonsson | Markus Franzén | Nils Karlsson | | |
| 2007–08 | Oskar Eriksson | Henric Jonsson | Markus Franzén | Nils Karlsson | | WJCC |
| 2008–09 | Kristian Lindström (fourth) | Oskar Eriksson (skip) | Alexander Lindström | Christoffer Sundgren | Henrik Leek | WJCC |
| 2009–10 | Kristian Lindström (fourth) | Oskar Eriksson (skip) | Alexander Lindström | Christoffer Sundgren | | |
| 2009–10 | Niklas Edin | Sebastian Kraupp | Fredrik Lindberg | Viktor Kjäll | Oskar Eriksson | ECC, OG |
| 2010–11 | Kristian Lindström (fourth) | Oskar Eriksson (skip) | Henrik Leek | Alexander Lindström | Christoffer Sundgren | WJCC |
| 2010–11 | Niklas Edin | Sebastian Kraupp | Fredrik Lindberg | Viktor Kjäll | Oskar Eriksson | ECC, WCC |
| 2011–12 | Kristian Lindström (fourth) | Oskar Eriksson (skip) | Henrik Leek | Alexander Lindström | Christoffer Sundgren | |
| 2011–12 | Niklas Edin | Sebastian Kraupp | Fredrik Lindberg | Viktor Kjäll | Oskar Eriksson | ECC, WCC |
| 2012–13 | Oskar Eriksson | Kristian Lindström | Markus Eriksson | Christoffer Sundgren | | |
| 2012–13 | Niklas Edin | Sebastian Kraupp | Fredrik Lindberg | Viktor Kjäll | Oskar Eriksson | ECC, WCC |
| 2013–14 | Oskar Eriksson | Kristian Lindström | Markus Eriksson | Christoffer Sundgren | | WCC |
| 2013–14 | Niklas Edin | Sebastian Kraupp | Fredrik Lindberg | Viktor Kjäll | Oskar Eriksson | ECC, OG |
| 2014–15 | Niklas Edin | Oskar Eriksson | Kristian Lindström | Christoffer Sundgren | Henrik Leek | ECC, WCC |
| 2015–16 | Niklas Edin | Oskar Eriksson | Kristian Lindström | Christoffer Sundgren | Henrik Leek | ECC, WCC |
| 2016–17 | Niklas Edin | Oskar Eriksson | Rasmus Wranå | Christoffer Sundgren | Henrik Leek | ECC, WCC |
| 2017–18 | Niklas Edin | Oskar Eriksson | Rasmus Wranå | Christoffer Sundgren | Henrik Leek | ECC, OG, WCC |
| 2018–19 | Niklas Edin | Oskar Eriksson | Rasmus Wranå | Christoffer Sundgren | Daniel Magnusson | ECC, WCC |
| 2019–20 | Niklas Edin | Oskar Eriksson | Rasmus Wranå | Christoffer Sundgren | Daniel Magnusson | ECC |
| 2020–21 | Niklas Edin | Oskar Eriksson | Rasmus Wranå | Christoffer Sundgren | Daniel Magnusson | WCC |
| 2021–22 | Niklas Edin | Oskar Eriksson | Rasmus Wranå | Christoffer Sundgren | Daniel Magnusson | ECC, OG, WCC |
| 2022–23 | Niklas Edin | Oskar Eriksson | Rasmus Wranå | Christoffer Sundgren | Daniel Magnusson | ECC, WCC |
| 2023–24 | Niklas Edin | Oskar Eriksson | Rasmus Wranå | Christoffer Sundgren | Daniel Magnusson | ECC, WCC |
| 2024–25 | Niklas Edin | Oskar Eriksson | Rasmus Wranå | Christoffer Sundgren | Daniel Magnusson (ECC); Simon Olofsson (WCC) | ECC, WCC |
| 2025–26 | Niklas Edin | Oskar Eriksson | Rasmus Wranå | Christoffer Sundgren | Simon Olofsson | ECC, OG, WCC |
| 2026–27 | Oskar Eriksson | Rasmus Wranå | Simon Olofsson | Christoffer Sundgren | | |
