= Gustav Eskilsson =

Swedish curler

Medal record

Curling

Representing Sweden

World Curling Championships
Silver medal – second place	2014 Beijing	

Gustav Anders Emil Eskilsson (born 2 January 1992 in Skellefteå) is a Swedish curler.

== Career ==
=== Juniors ===
Eskilsson represented Sweden in two World Junior Curling Championships. At the 2010 World Junior Curling Championships, he played third for Team Sweden, skipped by Patric Mabergs. The team went 4–5, missing the playoffs. The Mabergs rink returned to the Juniors in 2013. They finished the round robin with a 6–5 record, in fourth place. They went on to lose in the 3 vs. 4 game and in the bronze medal game, settling for 4th place.

Eskilsson represented Sweden again at the 2015 Winter Universiade. This time, Eskilsson would skip the team, but throw third rocks while Mabergs continued to throw last stones. The team, which also represented Umeå University, finished the round robin with a 6–5 record in 4th place. However, they lost to Norway in the semifinal and to Great Britain in the bronze medal game.

=== Mixed ===
Eskilsson played for Sweden at the 2013 European Mixed Curling Championship. He would skip the team, but throw third stones (with Towe Lundman throwing last rocks). The team would finish with a 5–2 record in group play, but lost in the quarterfinal to Finland.

=== Men's ===
Eskilsson was invited to be Sweden's alternate at the 2014 World Men's Curling Championship. The team, skipped by Oskar Eriksson, would win the silver medal. Eskilsson just played in one game.

On the World Curling Tour, Eskilsson has been skipping a team since 2013, with Mabergs throwing last stones. The team won their first Tour event at the 2016 Harbin International Men's Championship.
