= Kristian Lindström =

Swedish curler (born 1989)

- Curler
- Born: Kristian Lindström; 4 November 1989 (age 37); Östersund, Sweden

Team
- Mixed doubles partner: Johanna Heldin

Curling career
- World Championship: 3 (2014, 2015, 2016)
- European Championship: 2 (2014, 2015)
Medal record
Curling
Representing Sweden
World Championships
Gold medal – first place	2015 Halifax
Silver medal – second place	2014 Beijing
European Championships
Gold medal – first place	2014 Champéry
Gold medal – first place	2015 Esbjerg
World Junior Championships
Gold medal – first place	2011 Perth
Silver medal – second place	2007 Eveleth
Winter Universiade
Gold medal – first place	2013 Trentino
World Mixed Curling Championship
Silver medal – second place	2016 Kazan

Kristian Heldin Lindström (born 4 November 1989) is a Swedish curler and coach, originally from Östersund.

== Career ==
=== Juniors ===
As a junior curler, Lindström played in three World Junior Curling Championships. His first was the 2007 World Junior Curling Championships playing alternate for the Niklas Edin team which won a silver medal at the event. Lindström then played in the 2009 World Junior Curling Championships throwing last stones for Oskar Eriksson's team. The team finished in fourth place after losing to the United States in both the playoffs and the bronze medal game. The Eriksson rink would return to the World Juniors in 2011 with Lindström continuing to throw last stones. The team ran through the round robin in first place, with just one loss before winning both of their playoff games, including the final against Switzerland's Peter de Cruz. Lindström was also a member of the Eriksson rink (this time as third) at the 2013 Winter Universiade where they won a gold medal.

=== Men's ===
On the World Curling Tour, Lindström won three events as a member of the Eriksson rink, the 2009 Radisson SAS Oslo Cup, the 2012 Swiss Cup Basel and the 2013 European Masters. The team has played in two Grand Slam events, the 2013 Canadian Open of Curling where they went 1–4, and the 2014 Syncrude National where they made it to the quarter final. The team represented Sweden at the 2014 World Men's Curling Championship, where they won a silver medal.

Lindström and Eriksson joined the Niklas Edin rink in 2014, with Lindström playing second on the team. The team found immediate success with their new lineup, winning gold at the 2014 European Curling Championships and at the 2015 World Men's Curling Championship. They struggled on the tour though, winning just one event, the 2015 European Masters. The team played in four slams that season, failing to qualify in three of them. They did however make it to the final of the 2015 Elite 10.

The team started the next season by winning the 2015 Baden Masters, and then won another gold medal at the 2015 European Curling Championships. The team played in all seven slams that season, making it only as far as the quarterfinals in four events. They played in the 2016 World Men's Curling Championship, finishing sixth. After the season, Lindström left the team to form his own rink.

In 2014 he was inducted into the Swedish Curling Hall of Fame.

=== Coaching ===
Lindström also coached the Spanish women's team at the 2012 European Curling Championships as well as the Scottish team at the 2021 World Women's Curling Championship and the Great Britain women’s team at the 2022 Olympics winning Gold.

=== Mixed ===
He skipped the Swedish mixed team at the 2016 World Mixed Curling Championship.

== Personal life ==
Lindström's brother Alexander plays for the Steffen Walstad rink in Norway. He currently lives in Jönköping and is the coach of the Anna Hasselborg rink.
