= 2024 Tour Challenge =

Grand Slam of Curling event

2024 HearingLife Tour Challenge
- Host city: Charlottetown, Prince Edward Island
- Arena: Bell Aliant Centre
- Dates: October 1–6
- Men's winner: (Scotland) Team Mouat
- Curling club: Curl Edinburgh, Edinburgh
- Skip: Bruce Mouat
- Third: Grant Hardie
- Second: Bobby Lammie
- Lead: Hammy McMillan Jr.
- Coach: Michael Goodfellow
- Finalist: (Newfoundland and Labrador) Brad Gushue
- Women's winner: (Manitoba) Team Einarson
- Curling club: Gimli CC, Gimli
- Skip: Kerri Einarson
- Third: Val Sweeting
- Second: Dawn McEwen
- Lead: Krysten Karwacki
- Coach: Reid Carruthers
- Finalist: (Ontario) Rachel Homan

The 2024 HearingLife Tour Challenge was held from October 1 to 6 at the Bell Aliant Centre in Charlottetown, Prince Edward Island. It was the first Grand Slam event of the 2024–25 curling season, and the first event following the series' acquisition by The Curling Group. One of the main changes brought in by the new ownership included streaming every single game on every sheet.

Manitoba's Team Kerri Einarson won the women's final, defeating Team Rachel Homan from Ottawa, 5–4. It was Einarson's sixth Grand Slam. The team featured a temporary front-end of Dawn McEwen who was filling in for regular second Shannon Birchard who was injured, and Krysten Karwacki who was filling in for Briane Harris who was waiting on an appeal for being barred for testing positive for a banned substance.

On the men's side, Scotland's Team Bruce Mouat defeated Newfoundland's Brad Gushue 10–3. The win gave Mouat his first Tour Challenge, and with it a championship in each of the tour's five slams in his career (Gushue being the only other skip with this distinction). It was Mouat's seventh career Slam title.

In the tier two event, Saskatchewan's Rylan Kleiter beat Norway's Magnus Ramsfjell 6–5 in an extra end, while Nova Scotia's Christina Black defeated Japan's Team Sayaka Yoshimura 7–3. The wins qualified the rinks for the 2025 Masters, though Team Black will play at the 2024 National instead, as the Masters conflicts with the 2025 Ocean Contractors Women's Curling Championship.

== Qualification ==
The Tour Challenge consists of two tiers of 16 teams. For Tier 1, the top 16 men's and top 16 women's teams from the World Curling Federation's world rankings based on the final standings of the 2023–24 curling season will be invited to participate. In the event that a team declines their invitation, the next-ranked team on the world team ranking is invited until the field is complete. Once the Tier 1 field has been confirmed, Tier 2 invites will be sent out to the teams ranked 17–32. The Grand Slam of Curling reserves the right to implement a sponsor's exemption in both the Tier 2 men's and women's events in which one spot can be filled at their discretion.

=== Men ===
==== Tier 1 ====
Top world team ranking men's teams:

1. (Italy) Joël Retornaz
2. (Scotland) Bruce Mouat
3. (Newfoundland and Labrador) Brad Gushue
4. (Alberta) Brad Jacobs
5. (Scotland) Ross Whyte
6. (Sweden) Niklas Edin
7. (Switzerland) Yannick Schwaller
8. (Saskatchewan) Mike McEwen
9. (Manitoba) Matt Dunstone
10. (Alberta) Kevin Koe
11. (Manitoba) Reid Carruthers
12. (Scotland) James Craik
13. (United States) John Shuster
14. (Switzerland) Michael Brunner
15. (Scotland) Cameron Bryce

Sponsor's exemption:

- (United States) Korey Dropkin

==== Tier 2 ====
1. (Alberta) Aaron Sluchinski
2. (Norway) Magnus Ramsfjell
3. (Japan) Yusuke Morozumi
4. (Scotland) Kyle Waddell
5. (Saskatchewan) Rylan Kleiter
6. (United States) Daniel Casper
7. (Switzerland) Marco Hösli
8. (Germany) Marc Muskatewitz
9. (Switzerland) Yves Stocker
10. (South Korea) Park Jong-duk
11. (Netherlands) Wouter Gösgens
12. (Ontario) Sam Mooibroek
13. (Ontario) Scott Howard
14. (Japan) Riku Yanagisawa
15. (Norway) ~~Lukas Høstmælingen~~
16. (Nova Scotia) Owen Purcell

Host allocation:

- (Prince Edward Island) Tyler Smith

=== Women ===
==== Tier 1 ====
Top world team ranking women's teams:

1. (Ontario) Rachel Homan
2. (Switzerland) Silvana Tirinzoni
3. (South Korea) Gim Eun-ji
4. (Manitoba) Chelsea Carey
5. (Sweden) Anna Hasselborg
6. (Sweden) Isabella Wranå
7. (South Korea) Kim Eun-jung
8. (Manitoba) Kerri Einarson
9. (Italy) Stefania Constantini
10. (Manitoba) Kaitlyn Lawes
11. (Switzerland) Xenia Schwaller
12. (Japan) Satsuki Fujisawa
13. (United States) Tabitha Peterson
14. (Alberta) Selena Sturmay
15. (Scotland) Rebecca Morrison

Sponsor's exemption:

1. (United States) Delaney Strouse

==== Tier 2 ====
1. (Manitoba) Kate Cameron
2. (Norway) ~~Marianne Rørvik~~
3. (Japan) Ikue Kitazawa
4. (Ontario) Danielle Inglis
5. (Japan) Sayaka Yoshimura
6. (British Columbia) Corryn Brown
7. (South Korea) Ha Seung-youn
8. (Alberta) Serena Gray-Withers
9. (Alberta) Kayla Skrlik
10. (Denmark) Madeleine Dupont
11. (Saskatchewan) Jolene Campbell
12. (Saskatchewan) Ashley Thevenot
13. (Japan) Miyu Ueno
14. (Japan) Miku Nihira
15. (British Columbia) Kayla MacMillan
16. (Nova Scotia) Christina Black
17. (Manitoba) Beth Peterson

== Men ==
=== Tier 1 ===
==== Teams ====
The teams are listed as follows:

Skip	Third	Second	Lead	Alternate	Locale
Michael Brunner	Anthony Petoud	Romano Meier	Andreas Gerlach		Bern, Switzerland
Cameron Bryce	Duncan Menzies	Luke Carson	Robin McCall		Kelso, Scotland
Reid Carruthers	Catlin Schneider	Derek Samagalski	Connor Njegovan		Winnipeg, Manitoba
James Craik	Mark Watt	Angus Bryce	Blair Haswell		Forfar, Scotland
Korey Dropkin	Andrew Stopera	– (Note: Team Dropkin played with three players.)	Thomas Howell		(United States) Duluth, Minnesota
Matt Dunstone	B. J. Neufeld	Colton Lott	Ryan Harnden		Winnipeg, Manitoba
Niklas Edin	Oskar Eriksson	Rasmus Wranå	Christoffer Sundgren		Karlstad, Sweden
Brad Gushue	Mark Nichols	E. J. Harnden	Geoff Walker		St. John's, Newfoundland and Labrador
Brad Jacobs	Marc Kennedy	Brett Gallant	Ben Hebert		Calgary, Alberta
Kevin Koe	Tyler Tardi	– (Note: Team Koe played with three players.)	Karrick Martin		Calgary, Alberta
Mike McEwen	Colton Flasch	Kevin Marsh	Dan Marsh		Saskatoon, Saskatchewan
Bruce Mouat	Grant Hardie	Bobby Lammie	Hammy McMillan Jr.		Edinburgh, Scotland
Joël Retornaz	Amos Mosaner	Sebastiano Arman	Mattia Giovanella		Trentino, Italy
Benoît Schwarz-van Berkel (Fourth)	Yannick Schwaller (Skip)	Sven Michel	Pablo Lachat		Geneva, Switzerland
John Shuster	Chris Plys	Colin Hufman	John Landsteiner	Matt Hamilton	(United States) Duluth, Minnesota
Ross Whyte	Robin Brydone	Duncan McFadzean	Euan Kyle		Stirling, Scotland

==== Knockout Brackets ====
===== A Event =====
A Event	Qualifier 1
1	(Italy) Joël Retornaz	6
1	(United States) Korey Dropkin	3	9	(Italy) Joël Retornaz	2
2	(Saskatchewan) Mike McEwen	5	9	(Manitoba) Matt Dunstone	6
2	(Manitoba) Matt Dunstone	6	13	(Manitoba) Matt Dunstone	5
3	(Alberta) Brad Jacobs	6	13	(Alberta) Brad Jacobs	7
3	(United States) John Shuster	5	10	(Alberta) Brad Jacobs	7
4	(Scotland) Ross Whyte	6	10	(Scotland) Ross Whyte	3
4	(Scotland) James Craik	3

A Event	Qualifier 2
5	(Scotland) Bruce Mouat	6
5	(Scotland) Cameron Bryce	2	11	(Scotland) Bruce Mouat	7
6	(Switzerland) Yannick Schwaller	4	11	(Alberta) Kevin Koe	1
6	(Alberta) Kevin Koe	7	14	(Scotland) Bruce Mouat	5
7	(Newfoundland and Labrador) Brad Gushue	7	14	(Sweden) Niklas Edin	4
7	(Switzerland) Michael Brunner	6	12	(Newfoundland and Labrador) Brad Gushue	5
8	(Sweden) Niklas Edin	7	12	(Sweden) Niklas Edin	7
8	(Manitoba) Reid Carruthers	5

===== B Event =====
B Event						Qualifier 3
15	(United States) Korey Dropkin	3
15	(Saskatchewan) Mike McEwen	8	19	(Saskatchewan) Mike McEwen	7
16	(United States) John Shuster	5	19	(Scotland) James Craik	2
16	(Scotland) James Craik	7				23	(Saskatchewan) Mike McEwen	8
						23	(Sweden) Niklas Edin	3

B Event						Qualifier 4
17	(Scotland) Cameron Bryce	3
17	(Switzerland) Yannick Schwaller	10	20	(Switzerland) Yannick Schwaller	5
18	(Switzerland) Michael Brunner	6	20	(Switzerland) Michael Brunner	2
18	(Manitoba) Reid Carruthers	5				24	(Switzerland) Yannick Schwaller	8
						24	(Manitoba) Matt Dunstone	3

B Event			Qualifier 5
21	(Italy) Joël Retornaz	4
21	(Scotland) Ross Whyte	6	25	(Scotland) Ross Whyte	6
22	(Alberta) Kevin Koe	7	25	(Alberta) Kevin Koe	4
22	(Newfoundland and Labrador) Brad Gushue	4

===== C Event =====
C Event						Qualifier 6
26	(United States) Korey Dropkin	3
26	(United States) John Shuster	8	28	(United States) John Shuster	7
			28	(Italy) Joël Retornaz	6
						31	(United States) John Shuster	5
						31	(Manitoba) Matt Dunstone	6

C Event						Qualifier 7
27	(Scotland) Cameron Bryce	6
27	(Manitoba) Reid Carruthers	2	29	(Scotland) Cameron Bryce	3
			29	(Newfoundland and Labrador) Brad Gushue	6
						32	(Newfoundland and Labrador) Brad Gushue	3
						32	(Sweden) Niklas Edin	2

C Event			Qualifier 8
30	(Scotland) James Craik	7
30	(Switzerland) Michael Brunner	2	33	(Scotland) James Craik	10
			33	(Alberta) Kevin Koe	3

==== Knockout Results ====
All draw times are listed in Atlantic Time (UTC−03:00).

===== Draw 1 =====
Tuesday, October 1, 8:00 am

Sheet A	1	2	3	4	5	6	7	8	Final
(Italy) Joël Retornaz 🔨	1	0	1	0	2	0	1	1	6
(United States) Korey Dropkin	0	1	0	1	0	1	0	0	3

Sheet C	1	2	3	4	5	6	7	8	Final
(Sweden) Niklas Edin 🔨	0	3	0	0	1	0	2	1	7
(Manitoba) Reid Carruthers	1	0	2	0	0	2	0	0	5

Sheet D	1	2	3	4	5	6	7	8	Final
(Scotland) Bruce Mouat 🔨	2	0	1	1	2	0	X	X	6
(Scotland) Cameron Bryce	0	1	0	0	0	1	X	X	2

===== Draw 2 =====
Tuesday, October 1, 11:30 am

Sheet A	1	2	3	4	5	6	7	8	9	Final
(Alberta) Brad Jacobs	1	0	0	0	0	2	2	0	1	6
(United States) John Shuster 🔨	0	1	0	1	2	0	0	1	0	5

Sheet B	1	2	3	4	5	6	7	8	Final
(Scotland) Ross Whyte 🔨	0	2	0	1	0	1	2	X	6
(Scotland) James Craik	0	0	2	0	1	0	0	X	3

Sheet D	1	2	3	4	5	6	7	8	9	Final
(Switzerland) Yannick Schwaller	0	2	0	0	0	0	0	2	0	4
(Alberta) Kevin Koe 🔨	1	0	0	1	1	0	1	0	3	7

===== Draw 4 =====
Tuesday, October 1, 6:30 pm

Sheet B	1	2	3	4	5	6	7	8	Final
(Saskatchewan) Mike McEwen	0	0	2	0	0	2	0	1	5
(Manitoba) Matt Dunstone 🔨	0	1	0	2	1	0	2	0	6

Sheet C	1	2	3	4	5	6	7	8	9	Final
(Newfoundland and Labrador) Brad Gushue	0	2	0	2	0	0	2	0	1	7
(Switzerland) Michael Brunner 🔨	1	0	1	0	2	0	0	2	0	6

===== Draw 5 =====
Wednesday, October 2, 8:30 am

Sheet A	1	2	3	4	5	6	7	8	Final
(Scotland) Cameron Bryce	0	3	0	0	0	0	X	X	3
(Switzerland) Yannick Schwaller 🔨	1	0	3	1	1	4	X	X	10

Sheet B	1	2	3	4	5	6	7	8	Final
(Switzerland) Michael Brunner 🔨	2	1	0	1	0	1	0	1	6
(Manitoba) Reid Carruthers	0	0	2	0	2	0	1	0	5

Sheet C	1	2	3	4	5	6	7	8	Final
(United States) John Shuster	0	2	0	1	0	0	2	0	5
(Scotland) James Craik 🔨	1	0	2	0	1	1	0	2	7

Sheet D	1	2	3	4	5	6	7	8	Final
(Alberta) Brad Jacobs	1	0	2	1	0	2	1	X	7
(Scotland) Ross Whyte 🔨	0	1	0	0	2	0	0	X	3

===== Draw 7 =====
Wednesday, October 2, 4:00 pm

Sheet A	1	2	3	4	5	6	7	8	Final
(Newfoundland and Labrador) Brad Gushue	0	2	0	2	0	0	1	0	5
(Sweden) Niklas Edin 🔨	3	0	2	0	0	1	0	1	7

Sheet B	1	2	3	4	5	6	7	8	Final
(Scotland) Bruce Mouat	2	2	1	0	2	0	X	X	7
(Alberta) Kevin Koe 🔨	0	0	0	1	0	0	X	X	1

Sheet C	1	2	3	4	5	6	7	8	Final
(United States) Korey Dropkin 🔨	0	2	0	0	1	0	X	X	3
(Saskatchewan) Mike McEwen	1	0	1	2	0	4	X	X	8

Sheet D	1	2	3	4	5	6	7	8	Final
(Italy) Joël Retornaz	0	0	1	0	1	X	X	X	2
(Manitoba) Matt Dunstone 🔨	3	1	0	2	0	X	X	X	6

===== Draw 9 =====
Thursday, October 3, 8:30 am

Sheet A	1	2	3	4	5	6	7	8	Final
(Saskatchewan) Mike McEwen 🔨	0	2	0	2	0	3	X	X	7
(Scotland) James Craik	0	0	1	0	1	0	X	X	2

Sheet B	1	2	3	4	5	6	7	8	Final
(Alberta) Kevin Koe 🔨	3	0	1	0	1	1	0	1	7
(Newfoundland and Labrador) Brad Gushue	0	1	0	2	0	0	1	0	4

Sheet C	1	2	3	4	5	6	7	8	Final
(Italy) Joël Retornaz	0	0	2	0	2	0	0	X	4
(Scotland) Ross Whyte 🔨	2	1	0	2	0	0	1	X	6

Sheet D	1	2	3	4	5	6	7	8	Final
(Switzerland) Yannick Schwaller 🔨	0	2	1	1	0	0	1	X	5
(Switzerland) Michael Brunner	1	0	0	0	1	0	0	X	2

===== Draw 11 =====
Thursday, October 3, 4:00 pm

Sheet A	1	2	3	4	5	6	7	8	Final
(United States) Korey Dropkin 🔨	0	0	2	0	1	0	X	X	3
(United States) John Shuster	1	1	0	3	0	3	X	X	8

Sheet B	1	2	3	4	5	6	7	8	Final
(Scotland) Bruce Mouat 🔨	0	2	0	0	1	0	0	2	5
(Sweden) Niklas Edin	2	0	0	1	0	1	0	0	4

Sheet C	1	2	3	4	5	6	7	8	Final
(Manitoba) Matt Dunstone 🔨	3	0	1	0	0	0	1	0	5
(Alberta) Brad Jacobs	0	2	0	2	1	1	0	1	7

Sheet D	1	2	3	4	5	6	7	8	Final
(Scotland) Cameron Bryce 🔨	2	0	1	1	1	0	1	X	6
(Manitoba) Reid Carruthers	0	1	0	0	0	1	0	X	2

===== Draw 13 =====
Friday, October 4, 8:30 am

Sheet B	1	2	3	4	5	6	7	8	9	Final
(United States) John Shuster	1	0	1	0	0	4	0	0	1	7
(Italy) Joël Retornaz 🔨	0	1	0	1	0	0	3	1	0	6

Sheet C	1	2	3	4	5	6	7	8	Final
(Scotland) Cameron Bryce	0	1	1	0	0	1	0	X	3
(Newfoundland and Labrador) Brad Gushue 🔨	2	0	0	1	1	0	2	X	6

===== Draw 15 =====
Friday, October 4, 4:00 pm

Sheet A	1	2	3	4	5	6	7	8	Final
(Scotland) Ross Whyte	0	0	2	0	2	0	1	1	6
(Alberta) Kevin Koe 🔨	0	2	0	1	0	1	0	0	4

Sheet B	1	2	3	4	5	6	7	8	Final
(Switzerland) Yannick Schwaller	0	2	0	0	2	1	3	X	8
(Manitoba) Matt Dunstone 🔨	2	0	0	1	0	0	0	X	3

Sheet C	1	2	3	4	5	6	7	8	Final
(Scotland) James Craik 🔨	0	3	0	3	1	0	X	X	7
(Switzerland) Michael Brunner	0	0	1	0	0	1	X	X	2

Sheet D	1	2	3	4	5	6	7	8	Final
(Saskatchewan) Mike McEwen	0	0	4	0	1	0	3	X	8
(Sweden) Niklas Edin 🔨	0	1	0	1	0	1	0	X	3

===== Draw 17 =====
Saturday, October 5, 8:30 am

Sheet B	1	2	3	4	5	6	7	8	9	Final
(Newfoundland and Labrador) Brad Gushue 🔨	0	0	0	0	1	1	0	0	1	3
(Sweden) Niklas Edin	0	0	0	1	0	0	0	1	0	2

Sheet C	1	2	3	4	5	6	7	8	Final
(United States) John Shuster	1	0	1	0	2	0	1	0	5
(Manitoba) Matt Dunstone 🔨	0	1	0	2	0	0	0	3	6

Sheet D	1	2	3	4	5	6	7	8	Final
(Scotland) James Craik	3	0	2	0	3	2	X	X	10
(Alberta) Kevin Koe 🔨	0	2	0	1	0	0	X	X	3

==== Playoffs ====
Quarterfinals
A2	(Scotland) Bruce Mouat	8
C3	(Scotland) James Craik	4
B2	(Switzerland) Yannick Schwaller	3
B1	(Saskatchewan) Mike McEwen	5
A1	(Alberta) Brad Jacobs	5
C1	(Manitoba) Matt Dunstone	6
B3	(Scotland) Ross Whyte	4
C2	(Newfoundland and Labrador) Brad Gushue	5

Semifinals
A2	(Scotland) Bruce Mouat	6
B1	(Saskatchewan) Mike McEwen	2
C1	(Manitoba) Matt Dunstone	3
C2	(Newfoundland and Labrador) Brad Gushue	7

Final
A2	(Scotland) Bruce Mouat	10
C2	(Newfoundland and Labrador) Brad Gushue	3

===== Quarterfinals =====
Saturday, October 4, 4:00 pm

Sheet A	1	2	3	4	5	6	7	8	Final
(Switzerland) Yannick Schwaller	0	0	2	0	1	0	0	0	3
(Saskatchewan) Mike McEwen 🔨	0	1	0	2	0	0	0	2	5

Player percentages
(Switzerland) Team Schwaller		(Saskatchewan) Team McEwen	
Pablo Lachat	95%	Dan Marsh	92%
Sven Michel	92%	Kevin Marsh	91%
Yannick Schwaller	80%	Colton Flasch	94%
Benoît Schwarz-van Berkel	88%	Mike McEwen	80%
Total	89%	Total	89%

Sheet B	1	2	3	4	5	6	7	8	Final
(Scotland) Bruce Mouat 🔨	4	0	0	2	0	2	X	X	8
(Scotland) James Craik	0	1	1	0	2	0	X	X	4

Player percentages
(Scotland) Team Mouat		(Scotland) Team Craik	
Hammy McMillan Jr.	88%	Blair Haswell	94%
Bobby Lammie	81%	Angus Bryce	79%
Grant Hardie	85%	Mark Watt	75%
Bruce Mouat	94%	James Craik	79%
Total	87%	Total	82%

Sheet C	1	2	3	4	5	6	7	8	Final
(Scotland) Ross Whyte 🔨	0	1	0	1	0	2	0	0	4
(Newfoundland and Labrador) Brad Gushue	0	0	1	0	2	0	0	2	5

Player percentages
(Scotland) Team Whyte		(Newfoundland and Labrador) Team Gushue	
Euan Kyle	97%	Geoff Walker	97%
Duncan McFadzean	86%	E. J. Harnden	86%
Robin Brydone	92%	Mark Nichols	94%
Ross Whyte	70%	Brad Gushue	89%
Total	86%	Total	91%

Sheet D	1	2	3	4	5	6	7	8	Final
(Alberta) Brad Jacobs 🔨	2	0	1	0	1	0	1	0	5
(Manitoba) Matt Dunstone	0	1	0	1	0	1	0	3	6

Player percentages
(Alberta) Team Jacobs		(Manitoba) Team Dunstone	
Ben Hebert	95%	Ryan Harnden	95%
Brett Gallant	95%	Colton Lott	95%
Marc Kennedy	97%	B. J. Neufeld	89%
Brad Jacobs	88%	Matt Dunstone	94%
Total	94%	Total	93%

===== Semifinals =====
Saturday, October 4, 8:00 pm

Sheet B	1	2	3	4	5	6	7	8	Final
(Manitoba) Matt Dunstone	0	2	0	0	0	1	0	0	3
(Newfoundland and Labrador) Brad Gushue 🔨	1	0	0	0	2	0	1	3	7

Player percentages
(Manitoba) Team Dunstone		(Newfoundland and Labrador) Team Gushue	
Ryan Harnden	92%	Geoff Walker	89%
Colton Lott	83%	E. J. Harnden	88%
B. J. Neufeld	91%	Mark Nichols	86%
Matt Dunstone	81%	Brad Gushue	91%
Total	87%	Total	88%

Sheet D	1	2	3	4	5	6	7	8	Final
(Scotland) Bruce Mouat 🔨	0	1	0	4	1	0	X	X	6
(Saskatchewan) Mike McEwen	0	0	1	0	0	1	X	X	2

Player percentages
(Scotland) Team Mouat		(Saskatchewan) Team McEwen	
Hammy McMillan Jr.	100%	Dan Marsh	98%
Bobby Lammie	92%	Kevin Marsh	81%
Grant Hardie	92%	Colton Flasch	75%
Bruce Mouat	85%	Mike McEwen	69%
Total	92%	Total	81%

===== Final =====
Sunday, October 6, 11:00 am

Sheet C	1	2	3	4	5	6	7	8	Final
(Scotland) Bruce Mouat 🔨	2	0	1	0	2	0	5	X	10
(Newfoundland and Labrador) Brad Gushue	0	0	0	2	0	1	0	X	3

Player percentages
(Scotland) Team Mouat		(Newfoundland and Labrador) Team Gushue	
Hammy McMillan Jr.	88%	Geoff Walker	89%
Bobby Lammie	86%	E. J. Harnden	61%
Grant Hardie	89%	Mark Nichols	80%
Bruce Mouat	96%	Brad Gushue	80%
Total	90%	Total	78%

=== Tier 2 ===
==== Teams ====
The teams are listed as follows:

Skip	Third	Second	Lead	Alternate	Locale
Luc Violette (Fourth)	Ben Richardson	Aidan Oldenburg	Rich Ruohonen (Skip) (Note: Rich Ruohonen spared for Daniel Casper. Third Luc Violette threw fourth rocks while Ruohonen threw lead rocks and skipped.)		(United States) Chaska, Minnesota
Wouter Gösgens	Laurens Hoekman	Jaap van Dorp	Tobias van den Hurk	Alexander Magan	Zoetermeer, Netherlands
Philipp Hösli (Fourth)	Marco Hösli (Skip)	Simon Gloor	Justin Hausherr		Glarus, Switzerland
Scott Howard	Mat Camm	Jason Camm	Tim March		Navan, Ontario
Rylan Kleiter	Joshua Mattern	Matthew Hall	Trevor Johnson		Saskatoon, Saskatchewan
Sam Mooibroek	Ryan Wiebe	Scott Mitchell	Nathan Steele		Whitby, Ontario
Yusuke Morozumi	Yuta Matsumura	Ryotaro Shukuya	Masaki Iwai	Kosuke Morozumi	Karuizawa, Japan
Marc Muskatewitz	Benny Kapp	Felix Messenzehl	Johannes Scheuerl	Mario Trevisiol	Füssen, Germany
Park Jong-duk	Jeong Yeong-seok	Oh Seung-hoon	Lee Ki-bok	Seong Ji-hoon	Gangwon, South Korea
Owen Purcell	Luke Saunders	Scott Saccary	Ryan Abraham		Halifax, Nova Scotia
Magnus Ramsfjell	Martin Sesaker	Bendik Ramsfjell	Gaute Nepstad		Trondheim, Norway
Aaron Sluchinski	Jeremy Harty	Kyle Doering	Dylan Webster		Airdrie, Alberta
Tyler Smith	Adam Cocks	Christopher Gallant	Ed White		Crapaud, Prince Edward Island
Jan Hess (Note: Jan Hess spared for Yves Stocker.)	Kim Schwaller	Felix Eberhard	Tom Winkelhausen		Zug, Switzerland
Kyle Waddell	Craig Waddell	Mark Taylor	Gavin Barr		Hamilton, Scotland
Riku Yanagisawa	Tsuyoshi Yamaguchi	Takeru Yamamoto	Satoshi Koizumi		Karuizawa, Japan

==== Knockout Brackets ====
===== A Event =====
A Event	Qualifier 1
1	(Alberta) Aaron Sluchinski	6
1	(Prince Edward Island) Tyler Smith	1	9	(Alberta) Aaron Sluchinski	5
2	(Germany) Marc Muskatewitz	4	9	(Germany) Marc Muskatewitz	8
2	(Switzerland) Team Stocker	3	13	(Germany) Marc Muskatewitz	5
3	(Scotland) Kyle Waddell	5	13	(Saskatchewan) Rylan Kleiter	7
3	(Ontario) Scott Howard	4	10	(Scotland) Kyle Waddell	5
4	(Saskatchewan) Rylan Kleiter	4	10	(Saskatchewan) Rylan Kleiter	7
4	(Ontario) Sam Mooibroek	3

A Event	Qualifier 2
5	(Norway) Magnus Ramsfjell	6
5	(Nova Scotia) Owen Purcell	5	11	(Norway) Magnus Ramsfjell	4
6	(Switzerland) Marco Hösli	7	11	(Switzerland) Marco Hösli	5
6	(South Korea) Park Jong-duk	5	14	(Switzerland) Marco Hösli	5
7	(Japan) Yusuke Morozumi	4	14	(Japan) Yusuke Morozumi	4
7	(Japan) Riku Yanagisawa	3	12	(Japan) Yusuke Morozumi	5
8	(United States) Team Casper	8	12	(United States) Team Casper	4
8	(Netherlands) Wouter Gösgens	3

===== B Event =====
B Event						Qualifier 3
15	(Prince Edward Island) Tyler Smith	1
15	(Switzerland) Team Stocker	6	19	(Switzerland) Team Stocker	6
16	(Ontario) Scott Howard	5	19	(Ontario) Sam Mooibroek	7
16	(Ontario) Sam Mooibroek	10				23	(Ontario) Sam Mooibroek	7
						23	(Japan) Yusuke Morozumi	1

B Event						Qualifier 4
17	(Nova Scotia) Owen Purcell	6
17	(South Korea) Park Jong-duk	5	20	(Nova Scotia) Owen Purcell	2
18	(Japan) Riku Yanagisawa	6	20	(Japan) Riku Yanagisawa	5
18	(Netherlands) Wouter Gösgens	5				24	(Japan) Riku Yanagisawa	4
						24	(Germany) Marc Muskatewitz	5

B Event			Qualifier 5
21	(Alberta) Aaron Sluchinski	6
21	(Scotland) Kyle Waddell	5	25	(Alberta) Aaron Sluchinski	3
22	(Norway) Magnus Ramsfjell	5	25	(Norway) Magnus Ramsfjell	6
22	(United States) Team Casper	4

===== C Event =====
C Event						Qualifier 6
26	(Prince Edward Island) Tyler Smith	4
26	(Ontario) Scott Howard	10	28	(Ontario) Scott Howard	0
			28	(Scotland) Kyle Waddell	8
						31	(Scotland) Kyle Waddell	5
						31	(Japan) Riku Yanagisawa	4

C Event						Qualifier 7
27	(South Korea) Park Jong-duk	6
27	(Netherlands) Wouter Gösgens	4	29	(South Korea) Park Jong-duk	4
			29	(United States) Team Casper	8
						32	(United States) Team Casper	7
						32	(Japan) Yusuke Morozumi	3

C Event			Qualifier 8
30	(Switzerland) Team Stocker	5
30	(Nova Scotia) Owen Purcell	7	33	(Nova Scotia) Owen Purcell	5
			33	(Alberta) Aaron Sluchinski	4

==== Knockout Results ====
All draw times are listed in Atlantic Time (UTC−04:00).

===== Draw 1 =====
Tuesday, October 1, 8:30 am

Sheet A	1	2	3	4	5	6	7	8	Final
(Alberta) Aaron Sluchinski	0	0	2	2	1	1	X	X	6
(Prince Edward Island) Tyler Smith 🔨	0	1	0	0	0	0	X	X	1

Sheet B	1	2	3	4	5	6	7	8	Final
(Germany) Marc Muskatewitz	1	0	1	0	0	1	0	1	4
(Switzerland) Team Stocker 🔨	0	1	0	0	1	0	1	0	3

Sheet C	1	2	3	4	5	6	7	8	Final
(United States) Team Casper 🔨	1	2	0	2	0	0	3	X	8
(Netherlands) Wouter Gösgens	0	0	1	0	2	0	0	X	3

Sheet D	1	2	3	4	5	6	7	8	Final
(Norway) Magnus Ramsfjell 🔨	2	1	0	0	0	2	0	1	6
(Nova Scotia) Owen Purcell	0	0	3	0	0	0	2	0	5

===== Draw 2 =====
Tuesday, October 1, 12:00 pm

Sheet A	1	2	3	4	5	6	7	8	Final
(Scotland) Kyle Waddell 🔨	0	1	1	1	0	1	0	1	5
(Ontario) Scott Howard	0	0	0	0	2	0	2	0	4

Sheet B	1	2	3	4	5	6	7	8	Final
(Saskatchewan) Rylan Kleiter 🔨	0	0	1	0	1	0	1	1	4
(Ontario) Sam Mooibroek	0	0	0	2	0	1	0	0	3

Sheet C	1	2	3	4	5	6	7	8	Final
(Japan) Yusuke Morozumi 🔨	0	2	0	0	0	1	0	1	4
(Japan) Riku Yanagisawa	0	0	0	1	0	0	2	0	3

Sheet D	1	2	3	4	5	6	7	8	Final
(Switzerland) Marco Hösli 🔨	2	0	2	1	0	1	0	1	7
(South Korea) Park Jong-duk	0	2	0	0	2	0	1	0	5

===== Draw 5 =====
Wednesday, October 2, 9:00 am

Sheet A	1	2	3	4	5	6	7	8	Final
(Nova Scotia) Owen Purcell 🔨	2	0	1	0	1	0	1	1	6
(South Korea) Park Jong-duk	0	1	0	3	0	1	0	0	5

Sheet B	1	2	3	4	5	6	7	8	9	Final
(Japan) Riku Yanagisawa 🔨	2	0	1	0	0	1	1	0	1	6
(Netherlands) Wouter Gösgens	0	1	0	2	1	0	0	1	0	5

Sheet C	1	2	3	4	5	6	7	8	Final
(Ontario) Scott Howard 🔨	1	0	2	0	2	0	0	X	5
(Ontario) Sam Mooibroek	0	3	0	2	0	4	1	X	10

Sheet D	1	2	3	4	5	6	7	8	Final
(Scotland) Kyle Waddell 🔨	1	0	1	0	1	0	2	0	5
(Saskatchewan) Rylan Kleiter	0	3	0	2	0	1	0	1	7

===== Draw 7 =====
Wednesday, October 2, 4:30 pm

Sheet A	1	2	3	4	5	6	7	8	Final
(Japan) Yusuke Morozumi 🔨	0	2	0	1	0	0	1	1	5
(United States) Team Casper	1	0	2	0	0	1	0	0	4

Sheet B	1	2	3	4	5	6	7	8	Final
(Norway) Magnus Ramsfjell 🔨	0	0	0	2	0	2	0	0	4
(Switzerland) Marco Hösli	0	0	1	0	1	0	2	1	5

Sheet C	1	2	3	4	5	6	7	8	Final
(Prince Edward Island) Tyler Smith	0	0	1	0	0	0	0	X	1
(Switzerland) Team Stocker 🔨	2	1	0	0	1	1	1	X	6

Sheet D	1	2	3	4	5	6	7	8	9	Final
(Alberta) Aaron Sluchinski	0	3	0	1	0	0	0	1	0	5
(Germany) Marc Muskatewitz 🔨	1	0	2	0	1	1	0	0	3	8

===== Draw 9 =====
Thursday, October 3, 9:00 am

Sheet A	1	2	3	4	5	6	7	8	Final
(Switzerland) Team Stocker	0	0	2	1	0	0	3	0	6
(Ontario) Sam Mooibroek 🔨	0	2	0	0	0	3	0	2	7

Sheet B	1	2	3	4	5	6	7	8	Final
(Norway) Magnus Ramsfjell	0	0	3	1	1	0	0	0	5
(United States) Team Casper 🔨	0	1	0	0	0	1	1	1	4

Sheet C	1	2	3	4	5	6	7	8	Final
(Alberta) Aaron Sluchinski	0	1	0	0	2	1	0	2	6
(Scotland) Kyle Waddell 🔨	1	0	3	0	0	0	1	0	5

Sheet D	1	2	3	4	5	6	7	8	Final
(Nova Scotia) Owen Purcell	0	1	0	0	0	0	1	X	2
(Japan) Riku Yanagisawa 🔨	2	0	0	1	0	2	0	X	5

===== Draw 11 =====
Thursday, October 3, 4:30 pm

Sheet A	1	2	3	4	5	6	7	8	Final
(Prince Edward Island) Tyler Smith	0	1	0	0	3	0	X	X	4
(Ontario) Scott Howard 🔨	2	0	2	3	0	3	X	X	10

Sheet B	1	2	3	4	5	6	7	8	Final
(Switzerland) Marco Hösli	0	1	1	0	1	1	0	1	5
(Japan) Yusuke Morozumi 🔨	1	0	0	1	0	0	2	0	4

Sheet C	1	2	3	4	5	6	7	8	Final
(Germany) Marc Muskatewitz	0	0	0	3	1	1	0	0	5
(Saskatchewan) Rylan Kleiter 🔨	0	2	1	0	0	0	2	2	7

Sheet D	1	2	3	4	5	6	7	8	Final
(South Korea) Park Jong-duk 🔨	0	2	0	2	0	1	0	1	6
(Netherlands) Wouter Gösgens	0	0	1	0	2	0	1	0	4

===== Draw 13 =====
Friday, October 4, 9:00 am

Sheet B	1	2	3	4	5	6	7	8	Final
(Ontario) Scott Howard	0	0	0	0	X	X	X	X	0
(Scotland) Kyle Waddell 🔨	2	1	1	4	X	X	X	X	8

Sheet C	1	2	3	4	5	6	7	8	Final
(South Korea) Park Jong-duk	0	2	0	1	0	1	0	X	4
(United States) Team Casper 🔨	3	0	1	0	3	0	1	X	8

===== Draw 15 =====
Friday, October 4, 4:30 pm

Sheet A	1	2	3	4	5	6	7	8	Final
(Alberta) Aaron Sluchinski 🔨	0	1	0	1	0	1	0	0	3
(Norway) Magnus Ramsfjell	2	0	2	0	1	0	0	1	6

Sheet B	1	2	3	4	5	6	7	8	Final
(Japan) Riku Yanagisawa 🔨	0	1	1	0	1	0	1	0	4
(Germany) Marc Muskatewitz	2	0	0	1	0	1	0	1	5

Sheet C	1	2	3	4	5	6	7	8	9	Final
(Switzerland) Team Stocker 🔨	1	0	1	0	2	0	1	0	0	5
(Nova Scotia) Owen Purcell	0	1	0	0	0	1	0	3	2	7

Sheet D	1	2	3	4	5	6	7	8	Final
(Ontario) Sam Mooibroek	0	3	2	0	0	2	X	X	7
(Japan) Yusuke Morozumi 🔨	0	0	0	0	1	0	X	X	1

===== Draw 17 =====
Saturday, October 5, 9:00 am

Sheet B	1	2	3	4	5	6	7	8	Final
(United States) Team Casper 🔨	1	0	2	1	0	2	0	1	7
(Japan) Yusuke Morozumi	0	1	0	0	2	0	0	0	3

Sheet C	1	2	3	4	5	6	7	8	Final
(Scotland) Kyle Waddell	0	1	0	2	0	0	0	2	5
(Japan) Riku Yanagisawa 🔨	0	0	2	0	0	1	1	0	4

Sheet D	1	2	3	4	5	6	7	8	Final
(Nova Scotia) Owen Purcell 🔨	2	0	0	1	0	1	0	1	5
(Alberta) Aaron Sluchinski	0	0	1	0	1	0	2	0	4

==== Playoffs ====
Quarterfinals
A1	(Saskatchewan) Rylan Kleiter	8
C3	(Nova Scotia) Owen Purcell	6
B2	(Germany) Marc Muskatewitz	6
B1	(Ontario) Sam Mooibroek	9
A2	(Switzerland) Marco Hösli	4
C2	(United States) Team Casper	5
B3	(Norway) Magnus Ramsfjell	5
C1	(Scotland) Kyle Waddell	3

Semifinals
A1	(Saskatchewan) Rylan Kleiter	5
B1	(Ontario) Sam Mooibroek	3
C2	(United States) Team Casper	4
B3	(Norway) Magnus Ramsfjell	9

Final
A1	(Saskatchewan) Rylan Kleiter	6
B3	(Norway) Magnus Ramsfjell	5

===== Quarterfinals =====
Saturday, October 4, 4:30 pm

Sheet A	1	2	3	4	5	6	7	8	Final
(Saskatchewan) Rylan Kleiter 🔨	0	1	0	2	0	3	0	2	8
(Nova Scotia) Owen Purcell	0	0	3	0	1	0	2	0	6

Player percentages
(Saskatchewan) Team Kleiter		(Nova Scotia) Team Purcell	
Trevor Johnson	84%	Ryan Abraham	83%
Matthew Hall	78%	Scott Saccary	92%
Joshua Mattern	83%	Luke Saunders	81%
Rylan Kleiter	70%	Owen Purcell	69%
Total	79%	Total	81%

Sheet B	1	2	3	4	5	6	7	8	Final
(Norway) Magnus Ramsfjell 🔨	2	0	0	1	2	0	0	X	5
(Scotland) Kyle Waddell	0	0	1	0	0	1	1	X	3

Player percentages
(Norway) Team Ramsfjell		(Scotland) Team Waddell	
Gaute Nepstad	91%	Gavin Barr	89%
Bendik Ramsfjell	96%	Mark Taylor	84%
Martin Sesaker	84%	Craig Waddell	86%
Magnus Ramsfjell	84%	Kyle Waddell	70%
Total	89%	Total	82%

Sheet C	1	2	3	4	5	6	7	8	Final
(Germany) Marc Muskatewitz	0	4	0	1	0	1	0	X	6
(Ontario) Sam Mooibroek 🔨	2	0	2	0	3	0	2	X	9

Player percentages
(Germany) Team Muskatewitz		(Ontario) Team Mooibroek	
Johannes Scheuerl	98%	Nathan Steele	83%
Felix Messenzehl	83%	Scott Mitchell	63%
Benny Kapp	84%	Ryan Wiebe	92%
Marc Muskatewitz	70%	Sam Mooibroek	81%
Total	84%	Total	80%

Sheet D	1	2	3	4	5	6	7	8	Final
(Switzerland) Marco Hösli 🔨	0	1	0	1	1	0	1	0	4
(United States) Team Casper	1	0	2	0	0	0	0	2	5

Player percentages
(Switzerland) Team Hösli		(United States) Team Casper	
Justin Hausherr	91%	Rich Ruohonen	86%
Simon Gloor	77%	Aidan Oldenburg	88%
Marco Hösli	81%	Ben Richardson	98%
Philipp Hösli	81%	Luc Violette	80%
Total	82%	Total	88%

===== Semifinals =====
Saturday, October 4, 8:30 pm

Sheet A	1	2	3	4	5	6	7	8	Final
(United States) Team Casper	0	0	0	2	0	2	0	X	4
(Norway) Magnus Ramsfjell 🔨	0	3	0	0	1	0	5	X	9

Player percentages
(United States) Team Casper		(Norway) Team Ramsfjell	
Rich Ruohonen	96%	Gaute Nepstad	95%
Aidan Oldenburg	88%	Bendik Ramsfjell	75%
Ben Richardson	93%	Martin Sesaker	95%
Luc Violette	77%	Magnus Ramsfjell	86%
Total	88%	Total	88%

Sheet B	1	2	3	4	5	6	7	8	Final
(Saskatchewan) Rylan Kleiter 🔨	1	0	0	1	0	2	0	1	5
(Ontario) Sam Mooibroek	0	1	1	0	1	0	0	0	3

Player percentages
(Saskatchewan) Team Kleiter		(Ontario) Team Mooibroek	
Trevor Johnson	97%	Nathan Steele	97%
Matthew Hall	97%	Scott Mitchell	83%
Joshua Mattern	86%	Ryan Wiebe	88%
Rylan Kleiter	89%	Sam Mooibroek	84%
Total	92%	Total	88%

===== Final =====
Sunday, October 6, 11:00 am

Sheet A	1	2	3	4	5	6	7	8	9	Final
(Saskatchewan) Rylan Kleiter 🔨	1	1	0	1	0	1	1	0	1	6
(Norway) Magnus Ramsfjell	0	0	1	0	2	0	0	2	0	5

Player percentages
(Saskatchewan) Team Kleiter		(Norway) Team Ramsfjell	
Trevor Johnson	94%	Gaute Nepstad	97%
Matthew Hall	88%	Bendik Ramsfjell	76%
Joshua Mattern	89%	Martin Sesaker	86%
Rylan Kleiter	81%	Magnus Ramsfjell	82%
Total	88%	Total	85%

== Women ==
=== Tier 1 ===
==== Teams ====
The teams are listed as follows:

Skip	Third	Second	Lead	Alternate	Locale
Chelsea Carey	Karlee Burgess	– (Note: Team Carey played with three players.)	Lauren Lenentine		Winnipeg, Manitoba
Stefania Constantini	Elena Mathis	Angela Romei	Giulia Zardini Lacedelli	Marta Lo Deserto	Cortina d'Ampezzo, Italy
Kerri Einarson	Val Sweeting	Dawn McEwen (Note: Dawn McEwen replaced Shannon Birchard who was recovering from a knee injury.)	Krysten Karwacki		Gimli, Manitoba
Satsuki Fujisawa	Chinami Yoshida	Yumi Suzuki	Yurika Yoshida		Kitami, Japan
Gim Eun-ji	Kim Min-ji	Kim Su-ji	Seol Ye-eun	Seol Ye-ji	Uijeongbu, South Korea
Anna Hasselborg	Sara McManus	Johanna Heldin (Note: Johanna Heldin replaced Agnes Knochenhauer who was attending her sister's wedding.)	Sofia Mabergs		Sundbyberg, Sweden
Rachel Homan	Tracy Fleury	Emma Miskew	Sarah Wilkes		Ottawa, Ontario
Kim Eun-jung	Kim Kyeong-ae	Kim Cho-hi	Kim Seon-yeong	Kim Yeong-mi	Gangneung, South Korea
Kaitlyn Lawes	Selena Njegovan	Jocelyn Peterman	Kristin Gordon	Becca Hebert	Winnipeg, Manitoba
Rebecca Morrison (Fourth)	Jennifer Dodds	Sophie Sinclair	Sophie Jackson (Skip) (Note: Sophie Jackson skipped Team Morrison.)		Stirling, Scotland
Cory Thiesse	Vicky Persinger	Aileen Geving (Note: Aileen Geving spared for Tabitha Peterson. She played second while Vicky Persinger and Cory Thiesse each moved up the lineup one position.)	Taylor Anderson-Heide		(United States) Saint Paul, Minnesota
Xenia Schwaller	Selina Gafner	Fabienne Rieder	Selina Rychiger		Zurich, Switzerland
Delaney Strouse	Sarah Anderson	Sydney Mullaney	Anne O'Hara		(United States) Traverse City, Michigan
Selena Sturmay	Danielle Schmiemann	Dezaray Hawes	Paige Papley		Edmonton, Alberta
Alina Pätz (Fourth)	Silvana Tirinzoni (Skip)	Selina Witschonke	Carole Howald		Aarau, Switzerland
Isabella Wranå	Almida de Val	Maria Larsson	Linda Stenlund		Sundbyberg, Sweden

==== Knockout Brackets ====
===== A Event =====
A Event	Qualifier 1
1	(Ontario) Rachel Homan	9
1	(United States) Delaney Strouse	3	9	(Ontario) Rachel Homan	2
2	(Manitoba) Kerri Einarson	4	9	(Italy) Stefania Constantini	6
2	(Italy) Stefania Constantini	6	13	(Italy) Stefania Constantini	7
3	(Manitoba) Chelsea Carey	6	13	(United States) Team Peterson	6
3	(United States) Team Peterson	9	10	(United States) Team Peterson	8
4	(Sweden) Anna Hasselborg	5	10	(Japan) Satsuki Fujisawa	5
4	(Japan) Satsuki Fujisawa	8

A Event	Qualifier 2
5	(Switzerland) Silvana Tirinzoni	9
5	(Scotland) Team Morrison	1	11	(Switzerland) Silvana Tirinzoni	3
6	(South Korea) Kim Eun-jung	3	11	(Manitoba) Kaitlyn Lawes	4
6	(Manitoba) Kaitlyn Lawes	6	14	(Manitoba) Kaitlyn Lawes	4
7	(South Korea) Gim Eun-ji	8	14	(South Korea) Gim Eun-ji	7
7	(Alberta) Selena Sturmay	7	12	(South Korea) Gim Eun-ji	7
8	(Sweden) Isabella Wranå	6	12	(Switzerland) Xenia Schwaller	4
8	(Switzerland) Xenia Schwaller	7

===== B Event =====
B Event						Qualifier 3
15	(United States) Delaney Strouse	4
15	(Manitoba) Kerri Einarson	7	19	(Manitoba) Kerri Einarson	7
16	(Manitoba) Chelsea Carey	4	19	(Sweden) Anna Hasselborg	1
16	(Sweden) Anna Hasselborg	7				23	(Manitoba) Kerri Einarson	5
						23	(Manitoba) Kaitlyn Lawes	4

B Event						Qualifier 4
17	(Scotland) Team Morrison	3
17	(South Korea) Kim Eun-jung	5	20	(South Korea) Kim Eun-jung	4
18	(Alberta) Selena Sturmay	7	20	(Sweden) Isabella Wranå	6
18	(Sweden) Isabella Wranå	9				24	(Sweden) Isabella Wranå	6
						24	(United States) Team Peterson	3

B Event			Qualifier 5
21	(Ontario) Rachel Homan	9
21	(Japan) Satsuki Fujisawa	1	25	(Ontario) Rachel Homan	6
22	(Switzerland) Silvana Tirinzoni	5	25	(Switzerland) Xenia Schwaller	4
22	(Switzerland) Xenia Schwaller	9

===== C Event =====
C Event						Qualifier 6
26	(United States) Delaney Strouse	1
26	(Manitoba) Chelsea Carey	10	28	(Manitoba) Chelsea Carey	1
			28	(Japan) Satsuki Fujisawa	5
						31	(Japan) Satsuki Fujisawa	8
						31	(United States) Team Peterson	4

C Event						Qualifier 7
27	(Scotland) Team Morrison	4
27	(Alberta) Selena Sturmay	3	29	(Scotland) Team Morrison	3
			29	(Switzerland) Silvana Tirinzoni	6
						32	(Switzerland) Silvana Tirinzoni	3
						32	(Manitoba) Kaitlyn Lawes	5

C Event			Qualifier 8
30	(Sweden) Anna Hasselborg	3
30	(South Korea) Kim Eun-jung	7	33	(South Korea) Kim Eun-jung	10
			33	(Switzerland) Xenia Schwaller	3

==== Knockout Results ====
All draw times are listed in Atlantic Time (UTC−03:00).

===== Draw 1 =====
Tuesday, October 1, 8:00 am

Sheet B	1	2	3	4	5	6	7	8	Final
(Sweden) Anna Hasselborg	0	1	0	1	1	0	2	0	5
(Japan) Satsuki Fujisawa 🔨	2	0	1	0	0	2	0	3	8

===== Draw 2 =====
Tuesday, October 1, 11:30 am

Sheet C	1	2	3	4	5	6	7	8	Final
(Sweden) Isabella Wranå 🔨	0	3	1	0	0	2	0	0	6
(Switzerland) Xenia Schwaller	0	0	0	3	1	0	2	1	7

===== Draw 3 =====
Tuesday, October 1, 3:00 pm

Sheet A	1	2	3	4	5	6	7	8	Final
(Ontario) Rachel Homan 🔨	0	0	4	3	0	2	X	X	9
(United States) Delaney Strouse	0	2	0	0	1	0	X	X	3

Sheet B	1	2	3	4	5	6	7	8	Final
(Manitoba) Kerri Einarson	0	2	0	1	1	0	0	X	4
(Italy) Stefania Constantini 🔨	1	0	2	0	0	0	3	X	6

Sheet C	1	2	3	4	5	6	7	8	Final
(South Korea) Kim Eun-jung	0	1	0	1	0	0	1	X	3
(Manitoba) Kaitlyn Lawes 🔨	2	0	1	0	0	3	0	X	6

Sheet D	1	2	3	4	5	6	7	8	Final
(Switzerland) Silvana Tirinzoni 🔨	3	1	0	1	4	X	X	X	9
(Scotland) Team Morrison	0	0	1	0	0	X	X	X	1

===== Draw 4 =====
Tuesday, October 1, 6:30 pm

Sheet A	1	2	3	4	5	6	7	8	Final
(Manitoba) Chelsea Carey 🔨	2	1	0	2	0	1	0	0	6
(United States) Team Peterson	0	0	1	0	3	0	2	3	9

Sheet D	1	2	3	4	5	6	7	8	9	Final
(South Korea) Gim Eun-ji 🔨	2	1	0	3	0	0	1	0	1	8
(Alberta) Selena Sturmay	0	0	1	0	1	2	0	3	0	7

===== Draw 6 =====
Wednesday, October 2, 12:00 pm

Sheet A	1	2	3	4	5	6	7	8	9	Final
(Alberta) Selena Sturmay 🔨	0	2	1	0	3	0	0	1	0	7
(Sweden) Isabella Wranå	0	0	0	4	0	1	2	0	2	9

Sheet B	1	2	3	4	5	6	7	8	Final
(South Korea) Gim Eun-ji	2	0	0	0	2	1	0	2	7
(Switzerland) Xenia Schwaller 🔨	0	1	0	2	0	0	1	0	4

Sheet C	1	2	3	4	5	6	7	8	Final
(United States) Delaney Strouse	0	2	1	0	0	1	0	0	4
(Manitoba) Kerri Einarson 🔨	1	0	0	2	0	0	2	2	7

Sheet D	1	2	3	4	5	6	7	8	Final
(Ontario) Rachel Homan	1	1	0	0	0	0	0	X	2
(Italy) Stefania Constantini 🔨	0	0	1	0	2	1	2	X	6

===== Draw 8 =====
Wednesday, October 2, 8:00 pm

Sheet A	1	2	3	4	5	6	7	8	Final
(Scotland) Team Morrison	0	0	1	0	1	0	1	X	3
(South Korea) Kim Eun-jung 🔨	0	1	0	2	0	2	0	X	5

Sheet B	1	2	3	4	5	6	7	8	Final
(Switzerland) Silvana Tirinzoni	0	0	2	0	0	1	0	0	3
(Manitoba) Kaitlyn Lawes 🔨	0	1	0	1	0	0	0	2	4

Sheet C	1	2	3	4	5	6	7	8	Final
(Manitoba) Chelsea Carey 🔨	0	0	1	1	1	0	1	0	4
(Sweden) Anna Hasselborg	1	1	0	0	0	4	0	1	7

Sheet D	1	2	3	4	5	6	7	8	Final
(United States) Team Peterson 🔨	0	2	0	0	3	0	0	3	8
(Japan) Satsuki Fujisawa	1	0	0	2	0	1	1	0	5

===== Draw 10 =====
Thursday, October 3, 12:00 pm

Sheet A	1	2	3	4	5	6	7	8	Final
(Switzerland) Silvana Tirinzoni	0	0	4	0	0	1	X	X	5
(Switzerland) Xenia Schwaller 🔨	4	1	0	2	2	0	X	X	9

Sheet B	1	2	3	4	5	6	7	8	Final
(Ontario) Rachel Homan	0	4	2	2	1	X	X	X	9
(Japan) Satsuki Fujisawa 🔨	1	0	0	0	0	X	X	X	1

Sheet C	1	2	3	4	5	6	7	8	Final
(South Korea) Kim Eun-jung	0	2	0	2	0	0	0	X	4
(Sweden) Isabella Wranå 🔨	2	0	1	0	0	1	2	X	6

Sheet D	1	2	3	4	5	6	7	8	Final
(Manitoba) Kerri Einarson 🔨	1	1	0	0	1	4	X	X	7
(Sweden) Anna Hasselborg	0	0	1	0	0	0	X	X	1

===== Draw 12 =====
Thursday, October 3, 8:00 pm

Sheet A	1	2	3	4	5	6	7	8	Final
(Manitoba) Kaitlyn Lawes	0	0	0	1	0	3	0	0	4
(South Korea) Gim Eun-ji 🔨	0	2	0	0	2	0	0	3	7

Sheet B	1	2	3	4	5	6	7	8	Final
(United States) Delaney Strouse	0	0	0	1	0	0	X	X	1
(Manitoba) Chelsea Carey 🔨	2	1	3	0	3	1	X	X	10

Sheet C	1	2	3	4	5	6	7	8	Final
(Italy) Stefania Constantini	0	1	0	2	0	3	0	1	7
(United States) Team Peterson 🔨	2	0	2	0	1	0	1	0	6

Sheet D	1	2	3	4	5	6	7	8	Final
(Scotland) Team Morrison 🔨	0	1	0	1	0	2	0	0	4
(Alberta) Selena Sturmay	0	0	1	0	1	0	0	1	3

===== Draw 13 =====
Friday, October 4, 8:30 am

Sheet A	1	2	3	4	5	6	7	8	Final
(Scotland) Team Morrison 🔨	0	1	0	1	0	0	1	X	3
(Switzerland) Silvana Tirinzoni	0	0	2	0	3	1	0	X	6

Sheet D	1	2	3	4	5	6	7	8	Final
(Manitoba) Chelsea Carey	0	0	0	1	0	0	0	X	1
(Japan) Satsuki Fujisawa 🔨	0	1	1	0	0	2	1	X	5

===== Draw 14 =====
Friday, October 4, 12:00 pm

Sheet A	1	2	3	4	5	6	7	8	Final
(Sweden) Anna Hasselborg	0	1	0	1	0	0	1	0	3
(South Korea) Kim Eun-jung 🔨	0	0	1	0	2	1	0	3	7

Sheet B	1	2	3	4	5	6	7	8	Final
(Sweden) Isabella Wranå 🔨	0	2	1	0	1	0	2	X	6
(United States) Team Peterson	0	0	0	1	0	2	0	X	3

Sheet C	1	2	3	4	5	6	7	8	Final
(Manitoba) Kerri Einarson 🔨	2	0	1	0	1	0	0	1	5
(Manitoba) Kaitlyn Lawes	0	1	0	1	0	1	1	0	4

Sheet D	1	2	3	4	5	6	7	8	Final
(Ontario) Rachel Homan	0	1	0	0	1	1	0	3	6
(Switzerland) Xenia Schwaller 🔨	1	0	0	2	0	0	1	0	4

===== Draw 16 =====
Friday, October 4, 8:00 pm

Sheet B	1	2	3	4	5	6	7	8	Final
(South Korea) Kim Eun-jung	1	0	0	3	0	2	4	X	10
(Switzerland) Xenia Schwaller 🔨	0	2	0	0	1	0	0	X	3

Sheet C	1	2	3	4	5	6	7	8	Final
(Japan) Satsuki Fujisawa	0	3	2	0	3	0	X	X	8
(United States) Team Peterson 🔨	1	0	0	2	0	1	X	X	4

Sheet D	1	2	3	4	5	6	7	8	Final
(Switzerland) Silvana Tirinzoni	0	0	2	0	0	1	0	0	3
(Manitoba) Kaitlyn Lawes 🔨	0	1	0	1	0	0	2	1	5

==== Playoffs ====
Quarterfinals
A2	(South Korea) Gim Eun-ji	6
C1	(Japan) Satsuki Fujisawa	9
B2	(Sweden) Isabella Wranå	1
B1	(Manitoba) Kerri Einarson	6
A1	(Italy) Stefania Constantini	2
C2	(Manitoba) Kaitlyn Lawes	5
B3	(Ontario) Rachel Homan	5
C3	(South Korea) Kim Eun-jung	3

Semifinals
C1	(Japan) Satsuki Fujisawa	4
B1	(Manitoba) Kerri Einarson	6
C2	(Manitoba) Kaitlyn Lawes	3
B3	(Ontario) Rachel Homan	4

Final
B1	(Manitoba) Kerri Einarson	5
B3	(Ontario) Rachel Homan	4

===== Quarterfinals =====
Saturday, October 4, 12:00 pm

Sheet A	1	2	3	4	5	6	7	8	Final
(Sweden) Isabella Wranå	0	0	0	0	0	1	X	X	1
(Manitoba) Kerri Einarson 🔨	1	0	1	1	3	0	X	X	6

Player percentages
(Sweden) Team Wranå		(Manitoba) Team Einarson	
Linda Stenlund	98%	Krysten Karwacki	92%
Maria Larsson	92%	Dawn McEwen	88%
Almida de Val	83%	Val Sweeting	100%
Isabella Wranå	52%	Kerri Einarson	92%
Total	81%	Total	93%

Sheet B	1	2	3	4	5	6	7	8	Final
(Italy) Stefania Constantini 🔨	2	0	0	0	0	0	0	X	2
(Manitoba) Kaitlyn Lawes	0	0	1	1	1	1	1	X	5

Player percentages
(Italy) Team Constantini		(Manitoba) Team Lawes	
Giulia Zardini Lacedelli	94%	Kristin Gordon	95%
Marta Lo Deserto	80%	Jocelyn Peterman	91%
Elena Mathis	91%	Selena Njegovan	83%
Stefania Constantini	68%	Kaitlyn Lawes	95%
Total	83%	Total	91%

Sheet C	1	2	3	4	5	6	7	8	Final
(Ontario) Rachel Homan 🔨	3	0	0	1	0	1	0	X	5
(South Korea) Kim Eun-jung	0	1	0	0	2	0	0	X	3

Player percentages
(Ontario) Team Homan		(South Korea) Team Kim	
Sarah Wilkes	89%	Kim Seon-yeong	100%
Emma Miskew	86%	Kim Cho-hi	89%
Tracy Fleury	98%	Kim Kyeong-ae	92%
Rachel Homan	92%	Kim Eun-jung	90%
Total	91%	Total	93%

Sheet D	1	2	3	4	5	6	7	8	Final
(South Korea) Gim Eun-ji 🔨	0	0	0	2	1	0	3	0	6
(Japan) Satsuki Fujisawa	1	1	3	0	0	2	0	2	9

Player percentages
(South Korea) Team Gim		(Japan) Team Fujisawa	
Seol Ye-eun	83%	Yurika Yoshida	88%
Kim Su-ji	69%	Yumi Suzuki	73%
Kim Min-ji	78%	Chinami Yoshida	77%
Gim Eun-ji	69%	Satsuki Fujisawa	62%
Total	75%	Total	75%

===== Semifinals =====
Saturday, October 4, 8:00 pm

Sheet A	1	2	3	4	5	6	7	8	Final
(Manitoba) Kaitlyn Lawes	0	0	1	0	0	1	1	0	3
(Ontario) Rachel Homan 🔨	0	2	0	0	1	0	0	1	4

Player percentages
(Manitoba) Team Lawes		(Ontario) Team Homan	
Kristin Gordon	80%	Sarah Wilkes	81%
Jocelyn Peterman	75%	Emma Miskew	77%
Selena Njegovan	80%	Tracy Fleury	80%
Kaitlyn Lawes	84%	Rachel Homan	75%
Total	80%	Total	78%

Sheet C	1	2	3	4	5	6	7	8	9	Final
(Japan) Satsuki Fujisawa	1	0	1	0	1	0	0	1	0	4
(Manitoba) Kerri Einarson 🔨	0	2	0	1	0	1	0	0	2	6

Player percentages
(Japan) Team Fujisawa		(Manitoba) Team Einarson	
Yurika Yoshida	89%	Krysten Karwacki	83%
Yumi Suzuki	85%	Dawn McEwen	75%
Chinami Yoshida	79%	Val Sweeting	83%
Satsuki Fujisawa	64%	Kerri Einarson	74%
Total	79%	Total	79%

===== Final =====
Sunday, October 6, 3:30 pm

Sheet C	1	2	3	4	5	6	7	8	Final
(Manitoba) Kerri Einarson	0	0	1	0	1	2	0	1	5
(Ontario) Rachel Homan 🔨	0	1	0	2	0	0	1	0	4

Player percentages
(Manitoba) Team Einarson		(Ontario) Team Homan	
Krysten Karwacki	63%	Sarah Wilkes	89%
Dawn McEwen	69%	Emma Miskew	80%
Val Sweeting	81%	Tracy Fleury	81%
Kerri Einarson	83%	Rachel Homan	70%
Total	74%	Total	80%

=== Tier 2 ===
==== Teams ====
The teams are listed as follows:

Skip	Third	Second	Lead	Alternate	Locale
Christina Black	Jill Brothers	Marlee Powers (Note: Alternate Marlee Powers played second, replacing Jenn Baxter.)	Karlee Everist		Halifax, Nova Scotia
Corryn Brown	Erin Pincott	Sarah Koltun	Samantha Fisher		Kamloops, British Columbia
Kate Cameron	Taylor McDonald	Brianna Cullen	Mackenzie Elias		St. Adolphe, Manitoba
Jolene Campbell	Abby Ackland	Rachel Erickson	Dayna Demmans		Regina, Saskatchewan
Madeleine Dupont	Mathilde Halse	Denise Dupont	My Larsen	Jasmin Holtermann	Hvidovre, Denmark
Serena Gray-Withers	Catherine Clifford	Lindsey Burgess	Zoe Cinnamon		Edmonton, Alberta
Ha Seung-youn	Kim Hye-rin	Yang Tae-i	Kim Su-jin	Park Seo-jin	Chuncheon, South Korea
Danielle Inglis	Kira Brunton	Calissa Daly	Cassandra de Groot		Ottawa, Ontario
Ikue Kitazawa	Seina Nakajima	Ami Enami	Minori Suzuki	Hasumi Ishigooka	Nagano, Japan
Kayla MacMillan	Sarah Daniels	Lindsay Dubue	Sarah Loken		Victoria, British Columbia
Beth Peterson	Kelsey Calvert	Katherine Remillard	Melissa Gordon-Kurz		Winnipeg, Manitoba
Kayla Skrlik	Margot Flemming	Ashton Skrlik	Geri-Lynn Ramsay		Calgary, Alberta
Momoha Tabata (Fourth)	Miku Nihira (Skip)	Sae Yamamoto	Mikoto Nakajima	Ayami Ito	Sapporo, Japan
Ashley Thevenot	Brittany Tran	Taylor Stremick	Kaylin Skinner		Saskatoon, Saskatchewan
Miyu Ueno	Asuka Kanai	Junko Nishimuro	Yui Ueno	Mone Ryokawa	Karuizawa, Japan
Sayaka Yoshimura	Yuna Kotani	Kaho Onodera	Anna Ohmiya	Mina Kobayashi	Sapporo, Japan

==== Knockout Brackets ====
===== A Event =====
A Event	Qualifier 1
1	(Manitoba) Kate Cameron	4
1	(Manitoba) Beth Peterson	7	9	(Manitoba) Beth Peterson	5
2	(Alberta) Kayla Skrlik	6	9	(Alberta) Kayla Skrlik	10
2	(Denmark) Madeleine Dupont	3	13	(Alberta) Kayla Skrlik	4
3	(Japan) Sayaka Yoshimura	7	13	(Japan) Sayaka Yoshimura	9
3	(Japan) Team Tabata	6	10	(Japan) Sayaka Yoshimura	7
4	(British Columbia) Corryn Brown	6	10	(British Columbia) Corryn Brown	4
4	(Japan) Miyu Ueno	4

A Event	Qualifier 2
5	(Japan) Ikue Kitazawa	5
5	(Nova Scotia) Christina Black	7	11	(Nova Scotia) Christina Black	4
6	(Alberta) Serena Gray-Withers	6	11	(Alberta) Serena Gray-Withers	6
6	(Saskatchewan) Jolene Campbell	4	14	(Alberta) Serena Gray-Withers	2
7	(Ontario) Danielle Inglis	4	14	(British Columbia) Kayla MacMillan	6
7	(British Columbia) Kayla MacMillan	10	12	(British Columbia) Kayla MacMillan	7
8	(South Korea) Ha Seung-youn	2	12	(Saskatchewan) Ashley Thevenot	3
8	(Saskatchewan) Ashley Thevenot	5

===== B Event =====
B Event						Qualifier 3
15	(Manitoba) Kate Cameron	5
15	(Denmark) Madeleine Dupont	6	19	(Denmark) Madeleine Dupont	4
16	(Japan) Team Tabata	6	19	(Japan) Team Tabata	10
16	(Japan) Miyu Ueno	2				23	(Japan) Team Tabata	7
						23	(Alberta) Serena Gray-Withers	0

B Event						Qualifier 4
17	(Japan) Ikue Kitazawa	8
17	(Saskatchewan) Jolene Campbell	4	20	(Japan) Ikue Kitazawa	9
18	(Ontario) Danielle Inglis	2	20	(South Korea) Ha Seung-youn	5
18	(South Korea) Ha Seung-youn	6				24	(Japan) Ikue Kitazawa	9
						24	(Alberta) Kayla Skrlik	3

B Event			Qualifier 5
21	(Manitoba) Beth Peterson	4
21	(British Columbia) Corryn Brown	5	25	(British Columbia) Corryn Brown	7
22	(Nova Scotia) Christina Black	4	25	(Saskatchewan) Ashley Thevenot	3
22	(Saskatchewan) Ashley Thevenot	6

===== C Event =====
C Event						Qualifier 6
26	(Manitoba) Kate Cameron	7
26	(Japan) Miyu Ueno	6	28	(Manitoba) Kate Cameron	3
			28	(Manitoba) Beth Peterson	9
						31	(Manitoba) Beth Peterson	7
						31	(Alberta) Kayla Skrlik	2

C Event						Qualifier 7
27	(Saskatchewan) Jolene Campbell	7
27	(Ontario) Danielle Inglis	6	29	(Saskatchewan) Jolene Campbell	4
			29	(Nova Scotia) Christina Black	8
						32	(Nova Scotia) Christina Black	7
						32	(Alberta) Serena Gray-Withers	1

C Event			Qualifier 8
30	(Denmark) Madeleine Dupont	0
30	(South Korea) Ha Seung-youn	7	33	(South Korea) Ha Seung-youn	6
			33	(Saskatchewan) Ashley Thevenot	2

==== Knockout Results ====
All draw times are listed in Atlantic Time (UTC−03:00).

===== Draw 3 =====
Tuesday, October 1, 3:30 pm

Sheet A	1	2	3	4	5	6	7	8	Final
(Manitoba) Kate Cameron 🔨	1	0	1	0	1	0	1	X	4
(Manitoba) Beth Peterson	0	1	0	3	0	3	0	X	7

Sheet B	1	2	3	4	5	6	7	8	Final
(Alberta) Kayla Skrlik 🔨	0	1	0	2	0	2	0	1	6
(Denmark) Madeleine Dupont	0	0	1	0	1	0	1	0	3

Sheet C	1	2	3	4	5	6	7	8	Final
(Alberta) Serena Gray-Withers	1	1	0	0	2	0	0	2	6
(Saskatchewan) Jolene Campbell 🔨	0	0	0	1	0	2	1	0	4

Sheet D	1	2	3	4	5	6	7	8	Final
(Japan) Ikue Kitazawa	0	2	0	1	1	0	1	0	5
(Nova Scotia) Christina Black 🔨	2	0	1	0	0	2	0	2	7

===== Draw 4 =====
Tuesday, October 1, 7:00 pm

Sheet A	1	2	3	4	5	6	7	8	Final
(Japan) Sayaka Yoshimura	0	0	2	1	0	1	0	3	7
(Japan) Team Tabata 🔨	0	1	0	0	2	0	3	0	6

Sheet B	1	2	3	4	5	6	7	8	Final
(British Columbia) Corryn Brown	0	0	1	2	0	3	0	X	6
(Japan) Miyu Ueno 🔨	0	2	0	0	1	0	1	X	4

Sheet C	1	2	3	4	5	6	7	8	Final
(South Korea) Ha Seung-youn 🔨	0	0	1	0	0	1	0	0	2
(Saskatchewan) Ashley Thevenot	0	0	0	1	0	0	2	2	5

Sheet D	1	2	3	4	5	6	7	8	Final
(Ontario) Danielle Inglis	0	0	1	0	3	0	0	X	4
(British Columbia) Kayla MacMillan 🔨	0	2	0	2	0	5	1	X	10

===== Draw 6 =====
Wednesday, October 2, 12:30 pm

Sheet A	1	2	3	4	5	6	7	8	Final
(Ontario) Danielle Inglis	0	0	1	0	0	1	0	X	2
(South Korea) Ha Seung-youn 🔨	0	2	0	2	1	0	1	X	6

Sheet B	1	2	3	4	5	6	7	8	Final
(British Columbia) Kayla MacMillan	2	0	0	2	0	1	2	X	7
(Saskatchewan) Ashley Thevenot 🔨	0	1	1	0	1	0	0	X	3

Sheet C	1	2	3	4	5	6	7	8	Final
(Manitoba) Kate Cameron 🔨	1	0	0	0	2	0	2	0	5
(Denmark) Madeleine Dupont	0	2	1	1	0	1	0	1	6

Sheet D	1	2	3	4	5	6	7	8	Final
(Manitoba) Beth Peterson	0	0	1	3	0	1	0	0	5
(Alberta) Kayla Skrlik 🔨	2	1	0	0	2	0	2	3	10

===== Draw 8 =====
Wednesday, October 2, 8:30 pm

Sheet A	1	2	3	4	5	6	7	8	Final
(Japan) Ikue Kitazawa	0	2	1	1	2	0	2	X	8
(Saskatchewan) Jolene Campbell 🔨	1	0	0	0	0	3	0	X	4

Sheet B	1	2	3	4	5	6	7	8	Final
(Nova Scotia) Christina Black 🔨	2	0	2	0	0	0	0	X	4
(Alberta) Serena Gray-Withers	0	2	0	1	1	0	2	X	6

Sheet C	1	2	3	4	5	6	7	8	Final
(Japan) Team Tabata	0	1	0	2	1	2	0	X	6
(Japan) Miyu Ueno 🔨	0	0	1	0	0	0	1	X	2

Sheet D	1	2	3	4	5	6	7	8	Final
(Japan) Sayaka Yoshimura 🔨	2	0	2	0	1	1	1	X	7
(British Columbia) Corryn Brown	0	2	0	2	0	0	0	X	4

===== Draw 10 =====
Thursday, October 3, 12:30 pm

Sheet A	1	2	3	4	5	6	7	8	Final
(Nova Scotia) Christina Black	0	1	0	2	1	0	0	X	4
(Saskatchewan) Ashley Thevenot 🔨	1	0	2	0	0	3	0	X	6

Sheet B	1	2	3	4	5	6	7	8	Final
(Manitoba) Beth Peterson 🔨	1	0	0	1	1	0	1	0	4
(British Columbia) Corryn Brown	0	1	1	0	0	1	0	2	5

Sheet C	1	2	3	4	5	6	7	8	Final
(Japan) Ikue Kitazawa 🔨	0	1	1	0	0	2	0	5	9
(South Korea) Ha Seung-youn	0	0	0	3	0	0	2	0	5

Sheet D	1	2	3	4	5	6	7	8	Final
(Denmark) Madeleine Dupont	0	0	1	0	3	0	X	X	4
(Japan) Team Tabata 🔨	3	2	0	2	0	3	X	X	10

===== Draw 12 =====
Thursday, October 3, 8:30 pm

Sheet A	1	2	3	4	5	6	7	8	Final
(Alberta) Serena Gray-Withers 🔨	0	1	0	0	0	1	0	X	2
(British Columbia) Kayla MacMillan	1	0	0	1	3	0	1	X	6

Sheet B	1	2	3	4	5	6	7	8	Final
(Manitoba) Kate Cameron	0	4	0	1	0	0	0	2	7
(Japan) Miyu Ueno 🔨	1	0	3	0	1	1	0	0	6

Sheet C	1	2	3	4	5	6	7	8	Final
(Alberta) Kayla Skrlik 🔨	0	0	2	1	0	1	0	0	4
(Japan) Sayaka Yoshimura	1	0	0	0	3	0	2	3	9

Sheet D	1	2	3	4	5	6	7	8	Final
(Saskatchewan) Jolene Campbell 🔨	0	0	0	0	4	2	1	0	7
(Ontario) Danielle Inglis	1	2	1	1	0	0	0	1	6

===== Draw 13 =====
Friday, October 4, 9:00 am

Sheet A	1	2	3	4	5	6	7	8	Final
(Saskatchewan) Jolene Campbell	0	2	1	0	1	0	0	X	4
(Nova Scotia) Christina Black 🔨	2	0	0	3	0	1	2	X	8

Sheet D	1	2	3	4	5	6	7	8	Final
(Manitoba) Kate Cameron 🔨	0	2	0	1	0	X	X	X	3
(Manitoba) Beth Peterson	1	0	5	0	3	X	X	X	9

===== Draw 14 =====
Friday, October 4, 12:30 pm

Sheet A	1	2	3	4	5	6	7	8	Final
(Denmark) Madeleine Dupont	0	0	0	0	0	0	X	X	0
(South Korea) Ha Seung-youn 🔨	0	1	1	2	2	1	X	X	7

Sheet B	1	2	3	4	5	6	7	8	Final
(Japan) Ikue Kitazawa	1	1	1	0	1	0	5	X	9
(Alberta) Kayla Skrlik 🔨	0	0	0	1	0	2	0	X	3

Sheet C	1	2	3	4	5	6	7	8	Final
(Japan) Team Tabata 🔨	0	2	2	1	2	X	X	X	7
(Alberta) Serena Gray-Withers	0	0	0	0	0	X	X	X	0

Sheet D	1	2	3	4	5	6	7	8	Final
(British Columbia) Corryn Brown 🔨	0	1	0	3	0	1	1	1	7
(Saskatchewan) Ashley Thevenot	1	0	1	0	1	0	0	0	3

===== Draw 16 =====
Friday, October 4, 8:30 pm

Sheet B	1	2	3	4	5	6	7	8	Final
(South Korea) Ha Seung-youn 🔨	0	1	0	2	1	0	2	X	6
(Saskatchewan) Ashley Thevenot	0	0	0	0	0	2	0	X	2

Sheet C	1	2	3	4	5	6	7	8	Final
(Manitoba) Beth Peterson	0	0	4	0	3	X	X	X	7
(Alberta) Kayla Skrlik 🔨	0	1	0	1	0	X	X	X	2

Sheet D	1	2	3	4	5	6	7	8	Final
(Nova Scotia) Christina Black 🔨	2	0	2	1	1	1	X	X	7
(Alberta) Serena Gray-Withers	0	1	0	0	0	0	X	X	1

==== Playoffs ====
Quarterfinals
A1	(Japan) Sayaka Yoshimura	7
C1	(Manitoba) Beth Peterson	1
B3	(British Columbia) Corryn Brown	1
B1	(Japan) Team Tabata	8
A2	(British Columbia) Kayla MacMillan	3
C2	(Nova Scotia) Christina Black	4
B2	(Japan) Ikue Kitazawa	2
C3	(South Korea) Ha Seung-youn	10

Semifinals
A1	(Japan) Sayaka Yoshimura	6
B1	(Japan) Team Tabata	5
C2	(Nova Scotia) Christina Black	5
C3	(South Korea) Ha Seung-youn	4

Final
A1	(Japan) Sayaka Yoshimura	3
C2	(Nova Scotia) Christina Black	7

===== Quarterfinals =====
Saturday, October 4, 12:30 pm

Sheet A	1	2	3	4	5	6	7	8	Final
(British Columbia) Corryn Brown 🔨	0	0	0	0	0	1	X	X	1
(Japan) Team Tabata	1	2	1	2	2	0	X	X	8

Player percentages
(British Columbia) Team Brown		(Japan) Team Tabata	
Samantha Fisher	98%	Mikoto Nakajima	90%
Sarah Koltun	81%	Sae Yamamoto	77%
Erin Pincott	46%	Miku Nihira	75%
Corryn Brown	33%	Momoha Tabata	79%
Total	65%	Total	80%

Sheet B	1	2	3	4	5	6	7	8	Final
(British Columbia) Kayla MacMillan 🔨	0	1	0	0	1	1	0	0	3
(Nova Scotia) Christina Black	0	0	0	0	0	0	1	3	4

Player percentages
(British Columbia) Team MacMillan		(Nova Scotia) Team Black	
Sarah Loken	91%	Karlee Everist	72%
Lindsay Dubue	73%	Marlee Powers	61%
Sarah Daniels	83%	Jill Brothers	72%
Kayla MacMillan	83%	Christina Black	67%
Total	82%	Total	68%

Sheet C	1	2	3	4	5	6	7	8	Final
(Japan) Ikue Kitazawa 🔨	0	0	0	2	0	X	X	X	2
(South Korea) Ha Seung-youn	3	1	4	0	2	X	X	X	10

Player percentages
(Japan) Team Kitazawa		(South Korea) Team Ha	
Minori Suzuki	100%	Kim Su-jin	85%
Ami Enami	73%	Yang Tae-i	90%
Seina Nakajima	57%	Kim Hye-rin	95%
Ikue Kitazawa	63%	Ha Seung-youn	83%
Total	73%	Total	88%

Sheet D	1	2	3	4	5	6	7	8	Final
(Japan) Sayaka Yoshimura 🔨	1	0	1	3	1	1	X	X	7
(Manitoba) Beth Peterson	0	1	0	0	0	0	X	X	1

Player percentages
(Japan) Team Yoshimura		(Manitoba) Team Peterson	
Anna Ohmiya	85%	Melissa Gordon	92%
Kaho Onodera	94%	Katherine Doerksen	65%
Yuna Kotani	92%	Kelsey Rocque	77%
Sayaka Yoshimura	85%	Beth Peterson	71%
Total	89%	Total	76%

===== Semifinals =====
Saturday, October 4, 8:30 pm

Sheet C	1	2	3	4	5	6	7	8	Final
(Japan) Sayaka Yoshimura 🔨	2	2	0	0	1	0	0	1	6
(Japan) Team Tabata	0	0	1	0	0	3	1	0	5

Player percentages
(Japan) Team Yoshimura		(Japan) Team Tabata	
Anna Ohmiya	92%	Mikoto Nakajima	83%
Kaho Onodera	97%	Sae Yamamoto	91%
Yuna Kotani	92%	Miku Nihira	77%
Sayaka Yoshimura	81%	Momoha Tabata	84%
Total	91%	Total	84%

Sheet D	1	2	3	4	5	6	7	8	Final
(Nova Scotia) Christina Black 🔨	1	0	1	0	0	2	0	1	5
(South Korea) Ha Seung-youn	0	1	0	1	1	0	1	0	4

Player percentages
(Nova Scotia) Team Black		(South Korea) Team Ha	
Karlee Everist	78%	Kim Su-jin	86%
Marlee Powers	88%	Yang Tae-i	67%
Jill Brothers	94%	Kim Hye-rin	88%
Christina Black	83%	Ha Seung-youn	91%
Total	86%	Total	83%

===== Final =====
Sunday, October 6, 3:30 pm

Sheet A	1	2	3	4	5	6	7	8	Final
(Japan) Sayaka Yoshimura 🔨	0	2	0	0	0	1	0	0	3
(Nova Scotia) Christina Black	0	0	1	1	0	0	3	2	7

Player percentages
(Japan) Team Yoshimura		(Nova Scotia) Team Black	
Anna Ohmiya	94%	Karlee Everist	84%
Kaho Onodera	88%	Marlee Powers	80%
Yuna Kotani	69%	Jill Brothers	81%
Sayaka Yoshimura	66%	Christina Black	86%
Total	79%	Total	83%
