= 2014 Swiss Junior Curling Championships =

Sports event

2014 Swiss Junior Curling Championships Junioren A SM Finalrunde 2014 Juniorinnen A SM Finalrunde 2014
- Host city: Bern, Switzerland
- Dates: January 24 - February 2
- Men's winner: (Canton of Bern) Team Schwaller
- Curling club: Team Bern Zähringer Securitas Direct, Bern
- Skip: Yannick Schwaller
- Fourth: Reto Keller
- Second: Patrick Witschonke
- Lead: Michael Probst
- Alternate: Mats Perret
- Coach: Erich Nyffenegger
- Finalist: Langenthal-Bern Terratex (Langenthal/Bern) Team Biedermann
- Women's winner: Glarus-Bern Team Mani
- Skip: Corina Mani
- Fourth: Briar Hürlimann
- Second: Rahel Thoma
- Lead: Tamara Michel
- Coach: Rolf Hösli
- Finalist: Wetzikon-Dübendorf (Dübendorf) Team Stern

The 2014 Swiss Junior Curling Championships, Switzerland's national Junior curling championships, were held from January 24 to February 2 at the Curlingzentrum Region Basel in Bern, Switzerland. The winners represented Switzerland at the 2014 World Junior Curling Championships. 8 teams each took part in the men's and women's events.

In the men's final, Yannick Schwaller and his team of Reto Keller, Patrick Witschonke and Michael Probst defeated Team Langenthal-Bern Terratex (Simon Biedermann) 9–6. It's the first title for the team Yannick Schwaller.

In the women's final, Corina Mani and her team of Briar Hürlimann, Rahel Thoma and Tamara Michel defeated Wetzikon-Dübendorf (Elena Stern) 10-9. It's the first title for the team Corina Mani.

== Men ==
=== Teams ===
Team	Fourth	Third	Second	Lead	Alternate	Coach
Baden Regio Personal Sigma (Baden)	Romano Meier	Michael Brunner	Kyrill Oehninger	Marcel Käufeler	Remo Herzog	Brigitte Brunner
Team Bern Zähringer Securitas Direct (Bern)	Reto Keller	Yannick Schwaller	Patrick Witschonke	Michael Probst	Mats Perret	Erich Nyffenegger
Dübendorf Raiffeisen (Dübendorf)	André Neuenschwander	Tobias Güntensperger	Sergio Gobbi	Kevin Keller		Marco Klaiber
Gstaad (Gstaad)	Stefan Stähli	Neal Schwenter	Roman Ott	Damian Stähli		Martin Stähli
Langenthal-Bern Terratex (Langenthal/Bern)	Simon Biedermann	Simon Ellenberger	David Biedermann	Raymond Krenger	Adrian Märki	Daniel Kormann
Luzern (Luzern)	Lucien Lottenbach	Lukas Christen	Henwy Lochmann	Yannick Jäggi	Thomas Hauser	Ernst Erb
Wetzikon Pozzo de Sol (Wetzikon)	Michael Hauser	Marc Wagenseil	Bastian Wyss	Etienne Lottenbach	Simon Künzli	Armin Hauser
Zug (Zug)	Jan Hess	Simon Gloor	Simon Hoehn	Reto Schönenberger		Serge Lusser

=== Round-robin standings ===
Final round-robin standings

	Team	1	2	3	4	5	6	7	8	W	L	Place
1	Baden Regio (Michael Brunner)	*	9:2	3:2	7:4	6:4	6:3	5:3	7:5	7	0	1
2	Bern (Yannick Schwaller)	2:9	*	8:2	7:4	8:6	5:7	7:3	10:0	5	2	2
3	Dübendorf Raiffeisen (André Neuenschwander)	2:3	2:8	*	6:7	8:10	8:3	3:5	5:4	2	5	6
4	Gstaad (Stefan Stähli)	4:7	4:7	7:6	*	3:5	3:4	6:5	11:9	3	4	5
5	Langenthal-Bern Terratex (Simon Biedermann)	4:6	6:8	10:8	5:3	*	7:8	6:4	9:7	4	3	4
6	Luzern (Lucien Lottenbach)	3:6	7:5	3:8	4:3	8:7	*	6:5	6:7	4	3	3
7	Wetzikon Pozzo de Sol (Michael Hauser)	3:5	3:7	5:3	5:6	4:6	5:6	*	3:11	1	6	8
8	Zug (Jan Hess)	5:7	0:10	4:5	9:11	7:9	7:6	11:3	*	2	5	7

teams to Playoffs

=== Playoffs ===
Quarterfinal
1	Baden Regio (Michael Brunner)	4
2	Bern (Yannick Schwaller)	5
3	Luzern (Lucien Lottenbach)	5
4	Langenthal-Bern (Simon Biedermann)	7

Semifinal
Baden Regio (Михаэль Бруннер)	3
Langenthal-Bern (Simon Biedermann)	5

Final
Bern (Yannick Schwaller)	9
Langenthal-Bern (Simon Biedermann)	4

Third place
Baden Regio (Michael Brunner)	9
Luzern (Lucien Lottenbach)	2

=== Standings ===
Place	Team	Skip	P	W	L
1st place, gold medalist(s)	Bern	Yannick Schwaller	9	7	2
2nd place, silver medalist(s)	Langenthal-Bern Terratex	Simon Biedermann	10	6	4
3rd place, bronze medalist(s)	Baden Regio	Michael Brunner	10	8	2
4	Luzern	Lucien Lottenbach	9	4	5
5	Gstaad	Stefan Stähli	7	3	4
6	Dübendorf Raiffeisen	André Neuenschwander	7	2	5
7	Zug	Jan Hess	7	2	5
8	Wetzikon Pozzo de Sol	Michael Hauser	7	1	6

== Women ==
=== Teams ===
Team	Fourth	Third	Second	Lead	Alternate	Coach
Adelboden effectconsulting (Adelboden)	Livia Schmid	Céline Koller	Alicia Guadalupi	Larissa Hari	Simone Wilhelm	Stefan Maurer
Bern (Bern)	Lisa Ammeter	Tanja Santschi	Isabel Siegenthaler	Jessica Jäggi	Rahel Häsler	Andreas Klauenbösch, Paddy Käser
Biel-Solothurn (Biel/Solothurn)	Michelle Gribi	Lisa Gisler	Chantal Bugnon	Vera Camponovo		Urs Dick
Glarus-Bern (Glarus/Bern)	Briar Hürlimann	Corina Mani	Rahel Thoma	Tamara Michel		Rolf Hösli
Küssnacht am Rigi (Küssnacht am Rigi)	Vanessa Züger	Nicolle Seyfang	Sarah Frey	Tina Rickenbacher	Karin Muff	Jonas Wälchli
Langenthal-St.Gallen Chromwerk (Langenthal/St.Gallen)	Andrea Marx	Adonia Brunner	Carole Howald	Gisèle Beuchat	Bettina Lanz, Flurina Kobler	Brigitte Brunner, Beat Brunner
Uzwil (Uzwil)	Lisa Ruch	Larissa Berchtold	Selina Ruch	Sarah Bieler	Lorena Bornacin	Marco Ruch
Wetzikon-Dübendorf (Wetzikon/Dübendorf)	Elena Stern	Anna Stern	Noelle Iseli	Tanja Schwegler		Patrick Poli

=== Round-robin standings ===
Final round-robin standings

	Team	1	2	3	4	5	6	7	8	W	L	Place
1	Adelboden (Livia Schmid)	*	13:5	7:5	4:6	5:10	7:6	6:3	3:5	4	3	5
2	Bern (Lisa Ammeter)	5:13	*	5:7	10:3	8:7	4:9	8:5	6:7	3	4	6
3	Biel-Solothurn (Michelle Gribi)	5:7	7:5	*	7:3	4:5	8:6	6:3	6:5	5	2	1
4	Glarus-Bern (Corina Mani)	6:4	3:10	3:7	*	9:2	8:11	8:6	5:3	4	3	4
5	Küssnacht am Rigi (Vanessa Züger)	10:5	7:8	5:4	2:9	*	6:12	6:10	2:9	2	5	7
6	Langenthal-St.Gallen (Andrea Marx)	6:7	9:4	6:8	11:8	12:6	*	6:5	5:8	4	3	3
7	Uzwil (Lisa Ruch)	3:6	5:8	3:6	6:8	10:6	5:6	*	3:13	1	6	8
8	Wetzikon-Dübendorf (Elena Stern)	5:3	7:6	5:6	3:5	9:2	8:5	13:3	*	5	2	2

teams to Playoffs

=== Playoffs ===
Quarterfinal
1	Biel-Solothurn (Michelle Gribi)	5
2	Wetzikon-Dübendorf (Elena Stern)	9
3	Langenthal-St.Gallen (Andrea Marx)	7
4	Glarus-Bern (Corina Mani)	8

Semifinal
Biel-Solothurn (Michelle Gribi)	5
Glarus-Bern (Corina Mani)	9

Final
Wetzikon-Dübendorf (Elena Stern)	9
Glarus-Bern (Corina Mani)	10

Third place
Biel-Solothurn (Michelle Gribi)	10
Langenthal-St.Gallen (Andrea Marx)	8

=== Standings ===
Place	Team	Skip	P	W	L
1st place, gold medalist(s)	Glarus-Bern	Corina Mani	10	7	3
2nd place, silver medalist(s)	Wetzikon-Dübendorf	Elena Stern	9	6	3
3rd place, bronze medalist(s)	Biel-Solothurn	Michelle Gribi	9	6	3
4	Langenthal-St.Gallen	Andrea Marx	9	4	5
5	Adelboden effectconsulting	Livia Schmid	7	4	3
6	Bern	Lisa Ammeter	7	3	4
7	Küssnacht am Rigi	Vanessa Züger	7	2	5
8	Uzwil	Lisa Ruch	7	1	6

== See also ==
- 2014 Swiss Men's Curling Championship
- 2014 Swiss Women's Curling Championship
- 2014 Swiss Mixed Doubles Curling Championship
- 2014 Swiss Wheelchair Curling Championship
