= Kim Schwaller =

Swiss curler (born 2003)

- Curler ♂
- Born: 4 May 2003 (age 23); Solothurn, Switzerland

Team
- Curling club: CC Basel (Basel), Oberwallis CC (Brig-Glis)
- Skip: Kim Schwaller
- Third: Jan Iseli
- Second: Andreas Gerlach
- Lead: Maximillian Winz

Curling career
- Member Association: Switzerland
- World Championship: 1 (2025)
- European Championship: 2 (2023, 2025)
- World Junior Curling Championship: 2 (2022, 2024)
- Olympic: 1 (2026)
Medal record
Curling
Representing Switzerland
Olympic Games
Bronze medal – third place	2026 Milano Cortina	Team
World Championships
Silver medal – second place	2025 Moose Jaw
European Championships
Silver medal – second place	2025 Lohja
Bronze medal – third place	2023 Aberdeen
Swiss Men's Curling Championship
Bronze medal – third place	2025 Bern
Bronze medal – third place	2026 Bern

Kim Schwaller (born 4 May 2003 in Solothurn) is a Swiss male curler from Halten. He currently skips his own team out of Solothurn. As the alternate of Team Yannick Schwaller, he won the bronze medal at the 2026 Winter Olympics.

== Teams and events ==
=== Men's ===
Season	Skip	Third	Second	Lead	Alternate	Coach	Events
2018–19	Noé Traub	Gregory Müggler	Linus Imfeld	Kim Schwaller	Jan Hiltensperger	Benno Arnold, Bastian Wyss	SJCC 2019 (bronze)
2019–20	Noé Traub	Gregory Müggler	Kim Schwaller	Linus Imfeld	Jan Hiltensperger	Bastian Wyss, Benno Arnold	SJCC 2020 (bronze)
2021–22	Jannis Bannwart (Fourth)	Kim Schwaller (Skip)	Andreas Gerlach	Noé Traub	Fabio Da Ros	Beat Brunner, Brigitte Brunner-Leutenegger	SJCC 2022 (silver)
2021–22	Anthony Petoud (Fourth)	Kim Schwaller (Skip)	Andreas Gerlach	Jannis Bannwart	Noé Traub	Brigitte Brunner	WJCC 2022 (5th)
2022–23	Dean Hürlimann (Fourth)	Kim Schwaller (Skip)	Pascal Matti	Jan Tanner	Matthieu Fague	Yannick Schwaller, Patrick Hürlimann, Janet Hürlimann	SJCC 2023 (bronze)
2022–23	Dean Hürlimann (Fourth)	Kim Schwaller (Skip)	Matthieu Fague	Jan Tanner	Pascal Matti	Patrick Hürlimann, Janet Hürlimann	SMCC 2023 (8th)
2023–24	Benoît Schwarz (Fourth)	Yannick Schwaller (Skip)	Sven Michel	Pablo Lachat	Kim Schwaller	Håvard Vad Petersson	ECC 2023 (bronze)
2023–24	Manuel Jermann	Yannick Jermann	Kenjo Von Allmen	Simon Hanhart	Kim Schwaller	Alexander Heinmann	WJCC 2024 (8th)
2023–24	Yves Stocker	Kim Schwaller	Felix Eberhard	Tom Winkelhausen			SMCC 2024 (5th)
2024–25	Jan Hess (Fourth)	Kim Schwaller (Skip)	Felix Eberhard	Tom Winkelhausen	Yves Stocker		SMCC 2025 (bronze)
2024–25	Benoît Schwarz-van Berkel (Fourth)	Yannick Schwaller (Skip)	Sven Michel	Pablo Lachat-Couchepin	Kim Schwaller	Håvard Vad Petersson	WCC 2025 (silver)
2025–26	Kim Schwaller	Marco Hefti	Felix Eberhard	Yves Stocker (Skip)			SMCC 2026 (bronze)
2025–26	Benoît Schwarz-van Berkel (Fourth)	Yannick Schwaller (Skip)	Sven Michel	Pablo Lachat-Couchepin	Kim Schwaller		ECC 2025 (silver); WOG 2026 (bronze)
2026–27	Kim Schwaller	Jan Iseli	Andreas Gerlach	Maximillian Winz			

=== Mixed doubles ===
Season	Female	Male	Events
2021–22	Alissa Rudolf	Kim Schwaller	SJDMCC 2022 (silver)
2022–23	Selina Rychiger	Kim Schwaller	SJDMCC 2023 (silver)

== Personal life ==
Kim Schwaller is a member of a well known Swiss curling family. His father is Christof Schwaller, his older brother is Yannick Schwaller, his uncle is Andreas Schwaller, and his cousin is Xenia Schwaller.

As of 2025, he is a bank customer advisor. He started curling in 2011 at the age of 10.
