= Tom Winkelhausen =

Swiss curler

- Curler ♂
- Born: 10 September 1996 (age 30); Bern, Switzerland

Team
- Curling club: Oberwallis CC (Brig-Glis)
- Skip: Jan Hess (fourth)
- Third: Kim Schwaller (skip)
- Second: Felix Eberhard
- Lead: Tom Winkelhausen
- Alternate: Yves Stocker

Curling career
- Member Association: Switzerland
- World Championship: 1 (2024)
- European Championship: 1 (2024)
Medal record
Curling
Swiss Men's Curling Championship
| Bronze medal – third place | 2025 Bern |

Tom Winkelhausen is a Swiss curler.

He competed for the Swiss men's team at the 2024 World Men's Curling Championship and the 2024 European Curling Championships.

At the national level, he is a bronze medalist at the Swiss men's and junior championships.

== Teams and events ==
=== Men's ===
| Season | Skip | Third | Second | Lead | Alternate | Coach | Events |
|---|---|---|---|---|---|---|---|
| 2015–16 | Lucien Lottenbach | Lukas Christen | Henry Lochmann | Yves Stocker | Tom Winkelhausen | Ernst Erb | SJCC 2016 (bronze) |
| 2016–17 | Florian Meister | Paddy Käser | Sven Michel | Michael Probst | Markus Eggler, Tom Winkelhausen | Markus Eggler | SMCC 2017 (5th) |
| 2017–18 | Lucien Lottenbach | Marc Wagenseil | Patrick Abächerli | Tom Winkelhausen | Nicola Stoll, Etienne Lottenbach | Etienne Lottenbach | SMCC 2018 (6th) |
| 2018–19 | Lucien Lottenbach | Rainer Kobler | Patrick Abächerli | Tom Winkelhausen | Felix Eberhard | Etienne Lottenbach | SMCC 2019 (4th) |
| 2019–20 | Lucien Lottenbach | Rainer Kobler | Patrick Abächerli | Tom Winkelhausen | Maximilian Winz | Daniel Stocker | SMCC 2020 (4th) |
| 2020–21 | Andrin Schnider | Oliver Widmer | Nicola Stoll | Fabian Schmid | Tom Winkelhausen | Peter Hartmann | SMCC 2021 (6th) |
| 2021–22 | Andrin Schnider | Nicola Stoll | Felix Eberhard | Tom Winkelhausen | Fabian Schmid | Rodger Gustaf Schmidt, Michelle Gribi | SMCC 2022 (6th) |
| 2022–23 | Andrin Schnider | Nicola Stoll | Noé Traub | Tom Winkelhausen | Oliver Widmer | Emil Schnider | SMCC 2023 (5th) |
| 2023–24 | Yves Stocker | Kim Schwaller | Felix Eberhard | Tom Winkelhausen | | | SMCC 2024 (5th) |
| 2023–24 | Benoît Schwarz (fourth) | Yannick Schwaller (skip) | Sven Michel | Pablo Lachat | Tom Winkelhausen | Håvard Vad Petersson | WCC 2024 (7th) |
| 2024–25 | Benoît Schwarz-van Berkel | Yannick Schwaller (skip) | Sven Michel | Pablo Lachat-Couchepin | Tom Winkelhausen | Håvard Vad Petersson | ECC 2024 (4th) |
| 2024–25 | Jan Hess (fourth) | Kim Schwaller (skip) | Felix Eberhard | Tom Winkelhausen | Yves Stocker | Yves Stocker | SMCC 2025 (bronze) |
