= Swiss Junior Curling Championships =

The Swiss Junior Curling Championships are the national championships of men's and women's junior curling teams in Switzerland. Junior level curlers must be under the age of 21. The championships have been held annually since 1972 for junior men and since 1984 for junior women. The championships are organized by the Swiss Curling Association.

== Men ==
=== Champions ===
| Year | Host city | Winning curling club (city) | Winning team (in order: fourth, third, second, lead, alternate, skips marked bold) |
|---|---|---|---|
| 1972 | Arlesheim | Dübendorf CC (Dübendorf) | Peter Attinger Jr., Bernhard Attinger, Mattias Neuenschwander, Jürg Geiler |
| 1973 | Gstaad | Dübendorf CC (Dübendorf) | Peter Attinger Jr., Bernhard Attinger, Mattias Neuenschwander, Jürg Geiler |
| 1974 | Wallisellen | Dübendorf CC (Dübendorf) | Bernhard Attinger, Ruedi Attinger, Kurt Attinger, Louis Keller |
| 1975 | Thun | Olten CC (Olten) | René Geiser, Peter Bösch, Niklaus Gartenmann, Felix Trüb |
| 1976 | Lausanne | Schaffhausen CC (Schaffhausen) | Jean-Claude Stettler, Marcel Rüefli, Hanspeter Ringli, Christoph Stiep |
| 1977 | St. Gallen | Lausanne-Ouchy CC (Lausanne) | Jürg Tanner, Jean-Pierre Morisetti, Jürg Hornisberger, Patrik Lörtscher |
| 1978 | Bern | Stäfa CC (Stäfa) | Felix Luchsinger, Thomas Grendelmeier, Daniel Streiff, Ueli Bernauer |
| 1979 | Wallisellen | Genève Centre (Geneva) | Eric Rudolf, Manuel Guiger, Pascal Bianchi, Toni Weil |
| 1980 | Geneva | Solothurn GCS (Solothurn) | Rico Simen, Thomas Kläy, Jürg Dick, Mario Gross |
| 1981 | Biel/Bienne | Solothurn GCS (Solothurn) | Rico Simen, Thomas Kläy, Jürg Dick, Mario Gross |
| 1982 | Schaffhausen | Zermatt CC (Zermatt) | Raoul Perren, Donat Perren, Diego Perren, Reto Biner |
| 1983 | Lausanne | Urdorf/Weihermatt CC (Urdorf) | André Flotron, Andreas Hänny, Daniel Gutknecht, André Szodoray |
| 1984 | Bern | Zürich-Dolder Center (Zürich) | Christian Saager, Jens Piesbergen, Urs Spiegel, Jörg Piesbergen |
| 1985 | Zürich | Stäfa CC (Stäfa) | Peter Grendelmeier, Andreas Stübing, Dani Bugmann, Pascal Jeanneret |
| 1986 | Lausanne | Thun Center (Thun) | Markus Eggler, Marc Haudenschild, Frank Kobel, Reto Huber |
| 1987 | Engelberg | Solothurn GCS (Solothurn) | Christof Schwaller, Christoph Kaiser, Beat Wyler, Peter Hostettler |
| 1988 | Urdorf | Thun Center (Thun) | Markus Eggler, Marc Haudenschild, Frank Kobel, Reto Huber |
| 1989 | Geneva | Arlesheim Center (Arlesheim) | Stefan Traub, Andreas Östreich, Markus Widmer, Roland Müggler |
| 1990 | Thun | Solothurn Center (Solothurn) | Dominic Andres, Mike Schüpbach, Marc Steiner, Mathias Hügli |
| 1991 | Weinfelden | Langenthal CC (Langenthal) | Stephan Heilmann, Chris Grossenbacher, Lucian Jenzer, Roger Wyss |
| 1992 | Crans-Montana | Genève Centre (Geneva) | Yannick Renggli, Chrislain Razafimahefa, Gregory Renggli, Patrick Tinembart |
| 1993 | Baden | Genève Centre (Geneva) | Yannick Renggli, Chrislain Razafimahefa, Gregory Renggli, Patrick Tinembart |
| 1994 | Wallisellen | St. Gallen Center (St. Gallen) | Ralph Stöckli, Pascal Erne, Pascal Sieber, Clemens Oberwiler |
| 1995 | Geneva | St. Gallen Center (St. Gallen) | Ralph Stöckli, Michael Bösiger, Pascal Sieber, Clemens Oberwiler |
| 1996 | Bern | St. Gallen Center (St. Gallen) | Ralph Stöckli, Michael Bösiger, Pascal Sieber, Clemens Oberwiler |
| 1997 | Baden | St. Gallen Center (St. Gallen) | Ralph Stöckli, Martin Zaugg, Pascal Sieber, Clemens Oberwiler |
| 1998 | Geneva | Wallisellen Center (Wallisellen) | Christian Haller, Urs Eichhorn, Pascal Albertin, René Kunz |
| 1999 | Bern | Neuchâtel Centre (Neuchâtel) | Patrick Vuille, Gilles Vuille, Benjamin Jaggi, Erich Leemann |
| 2000 | Wallisellen/Dübendorf | Glarus-Braunwald CC (Glarus) | Mark Hauser, Andreas Hingher, Martin Rios, Jan Hauser/Florian Grünenfelder |
| 2001 | Geneva | Glarus CC (Glarus) | Andreas Hingher, Martin Rios, Jan Hauser, Florian Grünenfelder/Cyril Benno Stutz |
| 2002 | Biel/Bienne | Dübendorf | Rico Pleisch, Pascal Hess, Fabian Kuster, Remo Schmid |
| 2003 | Dübendorf/Wallisellen | Zug CC (Zug) | Stefan Rindlisbacher, Sven Iten, Michael Hammerer, Reto Jetze |
| 2004 | Geneva | Lenk i.S. | Toni Müller, Andreas Klauenbösch, Andi Aegler, Nicolas Hauswirth |
| 2005 | Küsnacht | Interlaken CC (Interlaken) | Christian von Gunten, Sven Michel, Sandro Trolliet, Patric Schletti, Stephan Frutiger |
| 2006 | Bern | Interlaken CC (Interlaken) | Christian von Gunten, Sven Michel, Sandro Trolliet, Patric Schletti |
| 2007 | Bern | Luzern 1 (Lucerne) | Florian Meister, Bastian Brun, Rainer Kobler, Michael Koller |
| 2008 | Bern | Uzwil - Chromwerk (Uzwil) | Manuel Ruch, Claudio Pätz, Daniel Graf, Joël Greiner |
| 2009 | Biel/Bienne | Burgdorf CC (Burgdorf) | David Bärtschiger, Marc Pfister, Claudio Pätz, Enrico Pfister, Michael Bösiger |
| 2010 | Biel/Bienne | Genève CC (Geneva) | Peter de Cruz, Benoît Schwarz, Roger Gulka, Valentin Tanner |
| 2011 | Bern | Genève CC (Geneva) | Benoît Schwarz, Peter de Cruz, Roger Gulka, Valentin Tanner |

=== Champions and medallists ===
Team line-ups shows in order: fourth, third, second, lead, alternate, coach, skips marked bold.

| Year | Host city | Champion | Runner-up | Bronze |
|---|---|---|---|---|
| 2012 | Baden | Bern (Bern); Dominik Märki, Daniel Schifferli, Patrick Käser, Raphael Märki, coach: Pius Matter | Burgdorf-Flims (Burgdorf/Flims); Mike Wenger, Enrico Pfister, Armando Kühne, Olivier Zinniker, alternate: Michael Krähenbühl, coach: Erich Nyffenegger | Baden Regio Chromwerk (Baden); Michael Brunner, Romano Meier, Remo Herzog, Marcel Käufeler, coach: Brigitte Brunner |
| 2013 | Bern | Dübendorf Raiffeisen (Dübendorf); André Neuenschwander, Tobias Güntensberger, Sergio Gobbi, Kevin Keller, coach: Marco Klaiber | Wetzikon 1 (Wetzikon); Patrick Poli, Michael Hauser, Simon Künzli, Bastian Wyss, alternate: Etienne Lottenbach, coaches: Adrian Helbling, Armin Hauser | Gstaad Saanenland (Gstaad); Stefan Stähli, Neal Schwenter, Mats Perret, Roman Ott, alternates: Damian Stähli, Jeremy Pleydell-Bouverie, coach: Martin Stähli |
| 2014 | Bern | Bern 1 (Bern); Reto Keller, Yannick Schwaller, Patrick Witschonke, Michael Probst, alternate: Mats Perret, coach: Erich Nyffenegger | Langenthal-Bern Terratex (Langenthal/Bern); Simon Biedermann, Simon Ellenberger, David Biedermann, Raymond Krenger, alternate: Adrian Märki, coach: Daniel Kormann | Baden Regio Personal Sigma (Baden); Romano Meier, Michael Brunner, Kyrill Oehninger, Marcel Käufeler, alternate: Remo Herzog, coach: Brigitte Brunner |
| 2015 | Lucerne | Bern (Bern); Romano Meier, Yannick Schwaller, Patrick Witschonke, Michael Probst, coach: Erich Nyffenegger | Zug CABLEX (Zug); Jan Hess, Simon Gloor, Simon Höhn, Reto Schönenberger, coach: Serge Lusser | Baden Regio Personal Sigma (Baden); Michael Brunner, Marc Wagenseil, Remo Herzog, Lars Nielsen, alternate: Raymond Krenger, coach: Brigitte Brunner |
| 2016 | Thun | Zug Cablex (Zug); Jan Hess, Simon Gloor, Simon Höhn, Reto Schönenberger, coach: Serge Lusser | Schaffhausen (Schaffhausen); Oliver Widmer, Mark Kelly, Nicola Stoll, Andrin Schnider, alternate: Patrick Schneider, coaches: Mario Freiburger, Peter Sieber | Luzern Gartenmann Engineering (Lucerne); Lucien Lottenbach, Lukas Christen, Henry Lochmann, Yves Stocker, alternate: Tom Winkelhausen, coach: Ernst Erb |
| 2017 | Gstaad | Zug 1 Cablex (Zug); Jan Hess, Simon Gloor, Simon Höhn, Reto Schönenberger, coach: Serge Lusser | Adelboden (Adelboden); Andrin Schnider, Fabian Stucki, Oliver Inniger, Ilian Meier, alternate: Pascal Matti, coaches: Lorenz Krammer, Marc Wagenseil | Glarus (Glarus); Marco Hösli, Philipp Hösli, Marco Hefti, Jannis Spiess, alternate: Stefan Schuler, coach: Rolf Hösli |
| 2018 | Arlesheim | | | |
| 2019 | Arlesheim | Bern (Bern); Yves Stocker, Yves Wagenseil, Felix Eberhard, Marcel Gertsch, Rodger Schmidt, coach: Daniel Stocker | Lausanne Olympique 1 (Lausanne); Florian Mesot, Pablo Lachat, Anthony Petoud, Gaëtan Mancini, alternate: Theo Kurz, coach: Patrick Loertscher, Kevin Froidevaux | Basel 1 (Basel); Noé Traub, Gregory Müggler, Linus Imfeld, Kim Schwaller, alternate: Jan Hiltensperger, coach: Benno Arnold, Bastian Wyss |
| 2020 | Adelboden | Lausanne Olympique 1 (Lausanne); Anthony Petoud, Jan Klossner, Pablo Lachat, Theo Kurz, coach: Patrick Loertscher, Kevin Froidevaux | Glarus (Glarus); Marco Hösli, Philipp Hösli, Justin Hausherr, Jannis Spiess, coach: Marco Hefti, Rolf Hösli | Basel 1 (Basel); Noé Traub, Gregory Müggler, Kim Schwaller, Linus Imfeld, coach: Benno Arnold, Bastian Wyss |
| 2021 | not held | | | |
| 2022 | Thun | Solothurn-Biel CSS Versicherungen (Solothurn/Biel); Philipp Hösli, Jan Iseli, Maximilian Winz, Sandro Fanchini, alternate: Ilian Meier, coach: Rolf Iseli, Robert Hürlimann | St. Gallen - Wallisellen (St. Gallen/Wallisellen); Jannis Bannwart, Kim Schwaller, Andreas Gerlach, Noe Traub, alternate: Fabio Da Ros, coach: Beat Brunner, Brigitte Brunner-Leutenegger | Limmattal (Limmattal); Elias Hug, Geri Kummer, Lorenz Brunner, Timon Biehle, coach: Remo Jegi |
| 2023 | St. Gallen | Basel 1 (Basel); Manuel Jermann, Yannick Jermann, Simon Hanhart, Manuele Caccivio, alternate: Volodymyr Sakaliuk, coach: Christian Heinimann, Alexander Heinimann | Wildhaus (Wildhaus); Lars Brauchli, Leon Wittich, Kenjo von Allmen, Livio Ernst, coach: Hans Brauchli | Zug 1 (Zug); Dean Hürlimann, Kim Schwaller, Pascal Matti, Jan Tanner, alternate: Matthieu Fague, coach: Yannick Schwaller, Patrick Hürlimann, Janet Hürlimann |
| 2024 | Thun | Wildhaus (Wildhaus); Lars Brauchli, Leon Wittich, Felix Lüthold, Livio Ernst, alternate: Jonas Feierabend, coaches: Gregor Obrist, Hans Brauchli | Basel 1 (Basel); Loris Caccivio, Timo Traub, Timon Biehle, Nevio Caccivio, coach: Bastian Wyss | Morges 1 (Morges); Nathan Dryburgh, Liam Dryburgh, Thibaut Gertsch, Antoine Bovet, coach: Stewart Dryburgh |
| 2025 | Thun | Zug-Dübendorf (Zug/Dübendorf); Felix Lüthold, Leon Wittich, Livio Ernst, Jonas Feierabend, coach: Jonas Dietiker, Gregor Obrist | Morges ACE&Company (Morges); Nathan Dryburgh, Liam Dryburgh, Thibaut Gertsch, Antoine Bovet, alternate: Grégoire Danthe, Noé Kühn, coach: Stewart Dryburgh | Baden-Zug Markstein (Baden/Zug); Nicola Brand, Siro Schmid, Gian Loritz, Simon Rauchenstein, alternate: Nils Freimann, coach: Charly Suter, Michael Devaux, Carole Fäh |
| 2026 | Thun | Morges ACE&Company (Morges); Nathan Dryburgh, Liam Dryburgh, Noé Kühn, Antoine Bovet, alternate: Grégoire Danthe, coach: Stewart Dryburgh | Interlaken-Bern (Interlaken/Bern); Marco Ringgenberg, Masashi Nicolas, Timo Zingg, Levon Karnusian, coach: Christoph Riggenberg, Jan Klossner | Zug-Dübendorf (Zug/Dübendorf); Felix Lüthold, Jonas Feierabend, Livio Ernst, Nils Freimann, coach: Jonas Dietiker, Gregor Obrist |

== Women ==
=== Champions ===
| Year | Host city | Winning curling club (city) | Winning team (in order: fourth, third, second, lead, alternate, skips marked bold) |
|---|---|---|---|
| 1984 | Olten | Winterthur CC (Winterthur) | Marianne Flotron, Beatrice Arnold, Beatrice Frei, Jacky Zenhäusern |
| 1985 | Wallisellen | Solothurn GCS (Solothurn) | Karin Furrer, Christine Kläy, Karin Dick, Claudia Bärtschi |
| 1986 | Leukerbad | Winterthur CC (Winterthur) | Marianne Flotron, Gisela Peter, Beatrice Frei, Sandra Burkhard |
| 1987 | Biel/Bienne | Bern-City Damen (Bern) | Marianne Amstutz, Sandra Bracher, Stéphanie Walter, Franziska von Känel |
| 1988 | St. Gallen | Leukerbad Center (Leukerbad) | Diana Meichtry, Araxi Karnusian, Graziella Grichting, Jacqueline Loretan |
| 1989 | Neuchâtel | Zug CC (Zug) | Helga Oswald, Sara Ochsner, Janine Oswald, Tatjana Stalder |
| 1990 | Nennigkofen/Solothurn | Solothurn Center (Solothurn) | Nicole Strausak, Ursula Ziegler, Katja Matthies, Claudia Affolter |
| 1991 | Wallisellen | Zug CC (Zug) | Helga Oswald, Sara Ochsner, Janine Oswald, Tatjana Stalder |
| 1992 | Lausanne-Ouchy | Lausanne-Ouchy Centre (Lausanne-Ouchy) | Caroline Gruss, Magali Groux, Silvie Meillaud, Nancy Guignard |
| 1993 | Baden | Bern CBA (Bern) | Manuela Kormann, Sandra Zaugg, Miriam Wymann, Isabelle Zaugg |
| 1994 | Zürich | Genève Centre (Geneva) | Natalie Portmann, Laurence Defago, Carène Riedo, Céline Orizet |
| 1995 | Geneva | Solothurn Center (Solothurn) | Nadja Heuer, Carmen Küng, Sybil Bachofen, Vera Heuer |
| 1996 | Bern | Zürich-Dolder Center (Zürich) | Bianca Röthlisberger, Claudia Kunz, Nicole Broglie, Yvonne Notter |
| 1997 | Baden | Wallisellen Center (Wallisellen) | Silvana Tirinzoni, Michèle Knobel, Brigitte Schori, Martina von Arx |
| 1998 | Geneva | Wallisellen Center (Wallisellen) | Silvana Tirinzoni, Michèle Knobel, Brigitte Schori, Martina von Arx |
| 1999 | Bern | Schlieren/Urdorf Center (Schlieren/Urdorf) | Carmen Schäfer, Janine Greiner, Jacqueline Greiner, Christine Appenzeller |
| 2000 | Wallisellen/Dübendorf | Limmattal Center | Janine Greiner, Carmen Schäfer, Jacqueline Greiner, Barbara Appenzeller |
| 2001 | Geneva | Limmattal Center | Janine Greiner, Carmen Schäfer, Jacqueline Greiner, Barbara Appenzeller |
| 2002 | Biel/Bienne | Glarus CC (Glarus) | Valeria Spälty, Jacqueline Greiner, Angelina Wenger, Petra Feldmann/Ursina Pünchera |
| 2003 | Wallisellen/Dübendorf | Bern CC (Bern) | Christine Urech, Stéphanie Jäggi, Sandra Gantenbein, Christine Dreier |
| 2004 | Geneva | Biel/Bienne | Tania Grivel, Anna Hügli, Stéphanie Rüegsegger, Lena Bärtschiger, Fränzi Marthaler |
| 2005 | Küsnacht | CBA Bern (Bern) | Michèle Jäggi, Nadine Freiburghaus, Nicole Schwägli, Isabel Kurt |
| 2006 | Bern | Grindelwald CC (Grindelwald) | Sandra Zurbuchen, Martina Baumann, Franziska Kaufmann, Fabienne Kaufmann |
| 2007 | Bern | CBA Bern (Bern) | Michèle Jäggi, Marisa Winkelhausen, Nicole Schwägli, Isabel Kurt |
| 2008 | Bern | CBA Bern 1 (Bern) | Michèle Jäggi, Marisa Winkelhausen, Nicole Schwägli, Isabel Kurt |
| 2009 | Biel/Bienne | Grindelwald CC (Grindelwald) | Martina Baumann, Marisa Winkelhausen, Franziska Kaufmann, Isabel Kurt, Annina Reimann |
| 2010 | Biel/Bienne | Basel CC (Basel) | Manuela Siegrist, Imogen Oona Lehmann, Claudia Hug, Janine Wyss, Viola Bagno |
| 2011 | Bern | Basel CC (Basel) | Manuela Siegrist, Briar Hürlimann, Claudia Hug, Janine Wyss, Alina Pätz |

=== Champions and medallists ===
Team line-ups shows in order: fourth, third, second, lead, alternate, coach, skips marked bold.

| Year | Host city | Champion | Runner-up | Bronze |
|---|---|---|---|---|
| 2012 | Baden | Basel-Biel Kägi-fret (Basel-Biel/Bienne); Melanie Barbezat, Briar Hürlimann, Mara Gautschi, Janine Wyss, coaches: Mike Reid, Pierre-Yves Grivel | Genève (Geneva); Camille Crottaz, Andrea Marx, Bettina Marx, Éleonore Parvex, coach: Laurence Bidaud | Bern (Bern); Nadine Lehmann, Jenny Perret, Valerie Lutz, Gisèle Beuchat, coach: Heinz Schmid |
| 2013 | Bern | Biel-Solothurn 1 (Biel/Bienne-Solothurn); Michelle Gribi, Lisa Gisler, Chantal Bugnon, Vera Camponovo, coach: Urs Dick | Uzwil 1 (Uzwil); Kerstin Ruch, Lisa Ruch, Larissa Berchtold, Selina Ruch, alternate: Sarah Bieler, coach: Marco Ruch | Uzwil-Wetzikon Chromwerk 1 (Uzwil); Elena Stern, Adonia Brunner, Noëlle Iseli, Anna Stern, alternate: Tanja Schwegler, coaches: Brigitte Brunner, Simone Iseli |
| 2014 | Bern | Glarus-Bern (Glarus-Bern); Briar Hürlimann, Corina Mani, Rahel Thoma, Tamara Michel, coach: Rolf Hösli | Wetzikon-Dübendorf (Dübendorf); Elena Stern, Anna Stern, Noëlle Iseli, Tanja Schwegler, coach: Patrick Poli | Biel-Solothurn (Biel/Bienne-Solothurn); Michelle Gribi, Lisa Gisler, Chantal Bugnon, Vera Camponovo, coach: Urs Dick |
| 2015 | Lucerne | Wetzikon-Dübendorf (Dübendorf); Elena Stern, Anna Stern, Noëlle Iseli, Tanja Schwegler, coach: Patrick Poli | Neuchâtel-Sports (Neuchâtel); Marine Gauchat, Ophélie Gauchat, Gaelle Pigeon, Fabienne Gimmel, coach: Sébastien Wettach | Bern ISP (Bern); Jana Stritt, Stefanie Berset, Joellle Lutz, Sophia Piccinni, coaches: Markus Lempen, Andreas Klauenbösch |
| 2016 | Thun | Luzern (Lucerne); Selina Witschonke, Elena Mathis, Melina Bezzola, Anna Gut, alternate: Larissa Schmid, coach: Sandra Witschonke | St.Gallen-Bern (St. Gallen/Bern); Raphaela Keiser, Adonia Brunner, Laura Engler, Gisèle Beuchat, coaches: Roland Ryf, Brigitte Brunner | Bern ISP (Bern); Jana Stritt, Stefanie Berset, Joellle Lutz, Jasmine Egli, alternate: Lara Moser, coaches: Markus Lempen, Andreas Klauenbösch |
| 2017 | Gstaad | Luzern (Lucerne); Selina Witschonke, Elena Mathis, Melina Bezzola, Anna Gut, coaches: Nicole Dünki, Sandra Witschonke | St.Gallen-Bern (St. Gallen/Bern); Raphaela Keiser, Laura Engler, Roxane Héritier, Nehla Meier, alternate: Mara Grassi, coaches: Stephan Keiser, Roger Engler | Lausanne-Morges (Lausanne); Mélissa Tanner, Celine Schwizgebel, Anaëlle Ciganek, Emma Suter, alternates: Joëlle Fuss, Jean-Philippe Suter, coach: Frédéric Tanner |
| 2018 | Arlesheim | | | |
| 2019 | Arlesheim | Luzern (Lucerne); Selina Witschonke, Elena Mathis, Marina Loertscher, Anna Gut, alternate: Laura Engler, coaches: Mirjam Ott, Alina Pätz | Lausanne-Morges (Lausanne); Mélissa Tanner, Celine Schwizgebel, Anaëlle Ciganek, Emma Suter, coach: Frédéric Tanner, Jean-Philippe Suter | Interlaken 1 (Interlaken); Fabienne Rieder, Selina Gafner, Nadine Rieder, Larissa Rubin, alternate: Selina Rychiger, coach: Martin Kobel, Fränzi Rieder |
| 2020 | Adelboden | Biel - St.Gallen (Biel/St.Gallen); Sarah Müller, Malin Da Ros, Marion Wüest, Eveline Matti, alternate: Laura Engler, coach: Meico Oehninger | Lausanne-Olympique Gstaad (Lausanne); Celine Schwizgebel, Ophélie Gauchat, Anaëlle Ciganek, Emma Suter, coach: Jean-Philippe Suter | Interlaken - Bern (Interlaken/Bern); Fabienne Rieder, Selina Gafner, Tina Zürcher, Nadine Rieder, altenrates: Selina Rychiger, Lisa Mumenthaler, coach: Tanja Santschi, Mara Fabiana Grassi |
| 2021 | not held | | | |
| 2022 | Thun | Grasshopper Club Zürich (Zurich); Xenia Schwaller, Malin Da Ros, Marion Wüest, Zoe Schwaller, alternate: Selina Gafner, coach: Sarah Müller, Annick Lusser Hess | Interlaken-Bern (Interlaken/Bern); Fabienne Rieder, Tina Zürcher, Laurane Flückiger Jenni, Selina Rychiger, coach: Neal Schwenter, Nadine Rieder, Mara Grassi | St.Gallen-Wetzikon Scherrer Schaltanlagen AG (St. Gallen/Wetzikon); Isabel Einspieler, Alissa Rudolf, Lynn Haupt, Renée Frigo, alternate: Noemi Haupt, coach: Marcel Wettstein, Gion T. Berther |
| 2023 | St. Gallen | Grasshopper Club Zürich (Zurich); Xenia Schwaller, Selina Gafner, Fabienne Rieder, Selina Rychiger, alternate: Malin Da Ros, coach: Marion Wüest, Andreas Schwaller | St. Gallen-Wetzikon HS Naturstein (St. Gallen/Wetzikon); Isabel Einspieler, Alissa Rudolf, Lynn Haupt, Renée Frigo, alternate: Noemi Haupt, coach: Brigitte Brunner-Leutenegger | Bern-Thun (Bern/Thun); Lisa Muhmenthaler, Ariane Oberson, Nina Rufer, Jana-Tamara Hählen, alternate: Noa Kusano, coach: Jana Stritt, Benno Oberson, Kurt Muhmenthaler |
| 2024 | Thun | Bern-Thun (Bern/Thun); Ariane Oberson, Laurane Flückiger Jenni, Lia Germann, Enya Caccivio, alternate: Noa Kusano, coaches: Jana Stritt, Benno Oberson | Limmattal-Wetzikon (Limmattall/Wetzikon); Zoe Schwaller, Jana Soltermann, Anikò Székely, Ladina Ramstein, alternate: Aline Koch, coaches: Stefan Fäh, Marcel Wettstein, Adrian Helbling | Basel-Wetzikon (Basel/Wetzikon); Kathrine Blackham, Jana Hoffmann, Johanna Blackham, Anika Meier, coach: Yves Gigandet |
| 2025 | Thun | St. Gallen-Flims-Baden (St. Gallen/Flims/Baden); Alissa Rudolf, Jana-Tamara Hählen, Renée Frigo, Elodie Jerger, coach: Beat Brunner, Brigitte Brunner-Leutenegger | Limmattal-Wetzikon (Limmattall/Wetzikon); Zoe Schwaller, Jana Soltermann, Anikó Székely, Ladina Ramstein, coach: Marcel Wettstein, Stefan Fäh, Adrian Helbling | Bern-Thun (Bern/Thun); Ariane Oberson, Laurane Flückiger Jenni, Lia Germann, Enya Caccivio, alternate: Isabel Einspieler, coach: Tina Zürcher, Jana Stritt, Benno Oberson |
| 2026 | Thun | Limmattal-Wetzikon (Limmattall/Wetzikon); Zoe Schwaller, Jana Soltermann, Anikó Székely, Ladina Ramstein, Jana-Tamara Hählen, coach: Marcel Wettstein, Stefan Fäh, Adrian Helbling | Basel-Aarau (Basel/Aarau); Elina Arnold, Sophie Heinimann, Lucia Nebbia, Julia Suter, Elena Oexl, coach: Benno Arnold | Basel (Basel); Johanna Blackham, Isabel Einspieler, Anika Meier, Enya Caccivio, Nuala Guex, coach: Yves Gigandet, Kathrine Blackham |

== Mixed Doubles ==
Team line-ups shows in order: female curler, male curler. The result is for U21 age group since the competition in 2023.

| Year | Host city | Champion | Runner-up | Bronze |
|---|---|---|---|---|
| 2019 | Arlesheim | Marina Loertscher, Gaëtan Mancini | Fabienne Mollet, Maximilian Winz, coach: Jan Iseli | Anna Gut, Pablo Lachat, coach: Léo Pannatier |
| 2020 | not held | | | |
| 2021 | not held | | | |
| 2022 | Zug | Xenia Schwaller, Noé Traub | Alissa Rudolf, Kim Schwaller | Marion Wüest, Philipp Hösli, coach: Selina Gafner, Jan Iseli |
| 2023 | Arlesheim | Xenia Schwaller, Noé Traub | Selina Rychiger, Kim Schwaller | Lea Jaberg, Timo Schacher |
| 2024 | Arlesheim | Jana Soltermann, Kenjo von Allmen | Anika Meier, Manuel Jermann, coach: Johanna Blackham | Nina Marbacher, Loris Caccivio |
| 2025 | Zug | Elodie Tschudi, Nathan Dryburgh, coach: Thomas Tschalär | Jana Soltermann, Felix Lüthold, coach: Gregor Obrist | Zoe Schwaller, Livio Ernst, coach: Marcel Wettstein |
| 2026 | St. Gallen | Zoe Schwaller, Livio Ernst, coach: Marcel Wettstein, Gregor Obrist | Elodie Tschudi, Nathan Dryburgh, coach: Thomas Tschalär | Jana-Tamara Hählen, Nevio Caccivio, coach: Loris Caccivio |

== See also ==
- Swiss Men's Curling Championship
- Swiss Women's Curling Championship
- Swiss Mixed Doubles Curling Championship
- Swiss Mixed Curling Championship
- Swiss Junior Mixed Doubles Curling Championship
- Swiss Wheelchair Curling Championship
- Swiss Senior Curling Championships
