= Simon Gloor =

Swiss curler

- Curler ♂
- Born: 8 May 1997 (age 29)

Team
- Curling club: Zug CC (Zug)
- Skip: Marco Hösli
- Fourth: Philipp Hösli
- Second: Simon Gloor
- Lead: Justin Hausherr
- Alternate: Jan Hess

Curling career
- Member Association: Switzerland
- World Championship: 2 (2022, 2026)
- European Championship: 1 (2026)
- World Junior Curling Championship: 3 (2016, 2017, 2018)
- Other appearances: Winter World University Games: 1 (2019)
Medal record
Curling
World Junior Championships
Bronze medal – third place	2018 Aberdeen
Swiss Men's Championship
Gold medal – first place	2026 Bern
Silver medal – second place	2025 Bern
Bronze medal – third place	2022 Thônex
Bronze medal – third place	2023 Thônex

Simon Gloor (born May 8, 1997) is a Swiss curler from Zug.

== Teams and events ==
=== Men's ===
Season	Skip	Third	Second	Lead	Alternate	Coach	Events
2013–14	Jan Hess	Simon Gloor	Simon Höhn	Reto Schönenberger		Serge Lusser	SJCC 2014 (7th)
2014–15	Jan Hess	Simon Gloor	Simon Höhn	Reto Schönenberger		Serge Lusser	SJCC 2015 (silver)
2014–15	Christian Haller (fourth)	Yves Hess (skip)	Rainer Kobler	Fabian Schmid	Simon Gloor, Jan Hess	Ivana Stadler, Edi Hess	SMCC 2015 (4th)
2015–16	Jan Hess	Simon Gloor	Simon Höhn	Reto Schönenberger		Serge Lusser	SJCC 2016 (gold)
2015–16	Yannick Schwaller	Romano Meier	Patrick Witschonke	Michael Probst	Simon Gloor	Bernhard Werthemann	WJCC 2016 (4th)
2016–17	Jan Hess	Simon Gloor	Simon Höhn	Reto Schönenberger	Oliver Widmer (WJCC)	Serge Lusser	WJCC 2017 (6th); SJCC 2017 (gold)
2017–18	Jan Hess	Simon Gloor	Simon Höhn	Reto Schönenberger	Philipp Hösli (WJCC), Andrin Schnider (SMCC)	Annick Lusser Hess, Serge Lusser (SMCC)	WJCC 2018 (bronze); SMCC 2018 (5th)
2018–19	Yannick Schwaller	Michael Brunner	Romano Meier	Marcel Käufeler	Simon Gloor	Pius Matter	WUG 2019 (4th)
2018–19	Jan Hess	Simon Gloor	Simon Höhn	Reto Schönenberger	Yves Hess	Yves Hess, Annick Lusser Hess	SMCC 2019 (5th)
2019–20	Jan Hess	Simon Gloor	Simon Höhn	Reto Schönenberger	Yves Hess	Linda Moore	SMCC 2020 (6th)
2020–21	Jan Hess	Simon Gloor	Yves Stocker	Reto Schönenberger	Kevin Wunderlin	Mirjam Ott, Ivana Stadler	SMCC 2021 (4th)
2021–22	Jan Hess (Fourth)	Yves Stocker (Skip)	Simon Gloor	Reto Schönenberger		Mirjam Ott	SMCC 2022 (bronze)
2021–22	Yannick Schwaller	Michael Brunner	Romano Meier	Marcel Käufeler	Simon Gloor	Bernhard Werthemann	WCC 2022 (6th)
2022–23	Jan Hess	Yves Stocker	Simon Gloor	Felix Eberhard	Reto Schönenberger		SMCC 2023 (bronze)
2023–24	Philipp Hösli (Fourth)	Marco Hösli (Skip)	Simon Gloor	Justin Hausherr		Rolf Hösli	SMCC 2024 (4th)
2024–25	Philipp Hösli (Fourth)	Marco Hösli (Skip)	Simon Gloor	Justin Hausherr	Rolf Hösli	Rolf Hösli	SMCC 2025 (silver)
2025–26	Philipp Hösli (Fourth)	Marco Hösli (Skip)	Simon Gloor	Justin Hausherr	Jan Hess (WCC)	Rolf Hösli	SMCC 2026 (gold); WMCC 2026 (5th)
2026–27	Philipp Hösli (Fourth)	Marco Hösli (Skip)	Simon Gloor	Justin Hausherr			

=== Mixed doubles ===
Season	Female	Male	Coach	Events
2019–20	Stefanie Berset	Simon Gloor		SMDCC 2020 (12th)
2021–22	Selina Witschonke	Simon Gloor		SMDCC 2022 (5th)
2022–23	Selina Witschonke	Simon Gloor		SMDCC 2023 (4th)
2023–24	Selina Witschonke	Simon Gloor		SMDCC 2024 (7th)
2024–25	Selina Rychiger	Simon Gloor	Tina Zürcher, Fabienne Rieder	SMDCC 2025 (6th)
