= Jan Hess =

Swiss curler

- Curler
- Born: 2 November 1997 (age 29)

Team
- Curling club: Zug CC, Zug
- Skip: Yves Stocker
- Fourth: Jan Hess
- Second: Simon Gloor
- Lead: Felix Eberhard

Curling career
- Member Association: Switzerland
- World Championship: 2 (2018, 2026)
- Other appearances: World Junior Championships: 2 (2017, 2018)
Medal record
Curling
World Junior Championships
Bronze medal – third place	2018 Aberdeen

Jan Hess (born 2 November 1997) is a Swiss curler.

== Teams ==
=== Men's ===
Season	Skip	Third	Second	Lead	Alternate	Coach	Events
2014–15	Jan Hess	Simon Gloor	Simon Höhn	Reto Schönenberger		Serge Lusser	SJCC 2015 (silver)
2014–15	Christian Haller (fourth)	Yves Hess (skip)	Rainer Kobler	Fabian Schmid	Simon Gloor, Jan Hess	Ivana Stadler, Edi Hess	SMCC 2015 (4th)
2015–16	Jan Hess	Simon Gloor	Simon Höhn	Reto Schönenberger			
2016–17	Jan Hess	Simon Gloor	Simon Höhn	Reto Schönenberger	Oliver Widmer	Serge Lusser	WJCC 2017 (6th)
2017–18	Jan Hess	Simon Gloor	Simon Höhn	Reto Schönenberger	Philipp Hösli (WJCC), Andrin Schnider (SMCC)	Annick Lusser Hess, Serge Lusser (SMCC)	WJCC 2018 (bronze); SMCC 2018 (5th)
2017–18	Marc Pfister	Enrico Pfister	Raphael Märki	Simon Gempeler	Jan Hess	Robert Hürlimann	WCC 2018 (7th)
2018–19	Jan Hess	Simon Gloor	Simon Höhn	Reto Schönenberger	Yves Hess	Yves Hess, Annick Lusser Hess	SMCC 2019 (5th)
2019–20	Jan Hess	Simon Gloor	Simon Höhn	Reto Schönenberger	Yves Hess	Linda Moore	SMCC 2020 (5th)
2020–21	Jan Hess	Simon Gloor	Yves Stocker	Reto Schönenberger	Kevin Wunderlin	Mirjam Ott, Ivana Stadler	SMCC 2021 (4th)
2021–22	Jan Hess (Fourth)	Yves Stocker (Skip)	Simon Gloor	Reto Schönenberger			
2022–23	Jan Hess (Fourth)	Yves Stocker (Skip)	Simon Gloor	Felix Eberhard			SMCC 2021 (3rd)

=== Mixed doubles ===
Season	Male	Female	Events
2018–19	Jan Hess	Carole Howald	SMDCC 2019 (4th)
2019–20	Jan Hess	Carole Howald	SMDCC 2020 (7th)
