= 2020 United States Mixed Doubles Curling Championship =

- Host city: Bemidji, Minnesota
- Arena: Bemidji Curling Club
- Dates: February 27 - March 1
- Winner: (Minnesota) Peterson / Polo
- Curling club: St. Paul CC, St. Paul; Bemidji CC, Bemidji
- Female: Tabitha Peterson
- Male: Joe Polo
- Finalist: (Minnesota) Christensen / Shuster

The 2020 United States Mixed Doubles Curling Championship was held from February 27 to March 1 at the Bemidji Curling Club in Bemidji, Minnesota. The twelve teams were divided into two pools of six teams each. Each pool played a full round robin with the top three from each pool proceeding to the playoffs. The winning team of Tabitha Peterson and Joe Polo was supposed to represent the United States at the 2020 World Mixed Doubles Curling Championship in Kelowna, Canada but the event got cancelled due to the COVID-19 pandemic. They will instead compete at the 2021 World Mixed Doubles Curling Championship in Aberdeen, Scotland as the 2021 U.S. Mixed Doubles National Championship was postponed due to the pandemic.

Tabitha Peterson and Joe Polo won the event with a 7–4 win over defending champions Cory Christensen and John Shuster in the final. Peterson and Polo made the final in the 2017 championship but lost to siblings Becca Hamilton and Matt Hamilton 7–6. Two-time champions Sarah Anderson and Korey Dropkin won the bronze medal with a 7–6 extra end win over Monica Walker and Alex Leichter. Anderson and Dropkin won the championship in 2015 and 2018 and had a quarterfinal finish in 2019.

The local Public Broadcasting Service (PBS) member, Lakeland PBS, covered the tournament. This included streaming the entire tournament and broadcasting the semifinals and finals live on the television channel.

== Qualification ==
There were five ways teams qualified for the championship:

- 2019 USMDCC finalists
  - Cory Christensen and John Shuster (champions)
  - Vicky Persinger and Chris Plys (runners-up)
- Highest finishing American teams at Colorado Curling Cup and Madtown DoubleDown (mixed doubles bonspiels in Denver, Colorado and Madison, Wisconsin, respectively)
  - Sarah Anderson and Korey Dropkin (2019 Colorado Curling Cup champions)
  - Becca Hamilton and Matt Hamilton (2019 Madtown DoubleDown)
- Four American teams, not already qualified, with highest year-to-date points in WCF World Team Ranking System
  - Madison Bear and Andrew Stopera
  - Alex Agre and Derrick McLean
  - Christine McMakin and Riley Fenson
  - Cristin Clark and Chris Bond
- Wild-card berth awarded by selection committee
  - Tabitha Peterson and Joe Polo
- Top three teams from 2020 United States Mixed Doubles Challenge Round
  - Monica Walker and Alex Leichter
  - Katherine Gourianova and Eli Clawson
  - Kim Rhyme and Jason Smith

=== Challenge round ===
Sixteen teams played at the 2020 United States Mixed Doubles Challenge Round, held in Portage, Wisconsin from December 19 to 22, 2019. Through a triple knockout competition the top three teams secured the final team spots at the Mixed Doubles Championship. Monica Walker and Alex Leichter were the first to clinch a championship berth when they defeated Katherine Gourianova and Eli Clawson in the 'A' bracket final. Gourianova and Clawson then dropped down to the 'B' bracket final where they had another opportunity to earn one of the final two berths, which they did when they defeated Becca Wood and Sean Franey. Wood and Franey then faced Kim Rhyme and Jason Smith in the 'C' bracket final for the third and final championship berth, which Rhyme and Smith secured with a 9-4 win.

== Teams ==
The teams are listed as follows:

| Female | Male | State(s) |
|---|---|---|
| Alex Agre | Derrick McLean | Minnesota, Washington |
| Sarah Anderson | Korey Dropkin | Minnesota |
| Madison Bear | Andrew Stopera | Wisconsin, New York |
| Cory Christensen | John Shuster | Minnesota |
| Cristin Clark | Chris Bond | Washington |
| Katherine Gourianova | Eli Clawson | Maryland |
| Becca Hamilton | Matt Hamilton | Wisconsin |
| Christine McMakin | Riley Fenson | Minnesota |
| Vicky Persinger | Chris Plys | Alaska, Minnesota |
| Tabitha Peterson | Joe Polo | Minnesota |
| Kim Rhyme | Jason Smith | Minnesota |
| Monica Walker | Alex Leichter | Massachusetts |

== Round-robin standings ==
Final round robin Standings

Key
| Teams to playoffs |
| Teams to tiebreakers |

| Pool A | W | L |
|---|---|---|
| (Minnesota) Anderson / Dropkin | 5 | 0 |
| (Alaska) (Minnesota) Persinger / Plys | 4 | 1 |
| (Massachusetts) Walker / Leichter | 3 | 2 |
| (Wisconsin) (New York (state)) Bear / Stopera | 2 | 3 |
| (Washington (state)) Clark / Bond | 1 | 4 |
| (Minnesota) McMakin / Fenson | 0 | 5 |

| Pool B | W | L |
|---|---|---|
| (Minnesota) Christensen / Shuster | 3 | 2 |
| (Wisconsin) Hamilton / Hamilton | 3 | 2 |
| (Minnesota) Peterson / Polo | 3 | 2 |
| (Maryland) Gourianova / Clawson | 3 | 2 |
| (Minnesota) Rhyme / Smith | 2 | 3 |
| (Minnesota) (Washington (state)) Agre / McLean | 1 | 4 |

== Round-robin results ==
All draw times are listed in Central Standard Time (UTC−06:00).

=== Draw 1 ===
Thursday, February 27, 2:30 pm

| Sheet 1 | 1 | 2 | 3 | 4 | 5 | 6 | 7 | 8 | Final |
| (Massachusetts) Walker / Leichter | 0 | 0 | 1 | 1 | 0 | 2 | 1 | 0 | 5 |
| (Alaska) (Minnesota) Persinger / Plys 🔨 | 3 | 1 | 0 | 0 | 2 | 0 | 0 | 2 | 8 |

| Sheet 2 | 1 | 2 | 3 | 4 | 5 | 6 | 7 | 8 | Final |
| (Minnesota) McMakin / Fenson | 0 | 1 | 0 | 0 | 3 | 0 | 0 | 0 | 4 |
| (Washington (state)) Clark / Bond 🔨 | 1 | 0 | 2 | 1 | 0 | 2 | 1 | 2 | 9 |

| Sheet 3 | 1 | 2 | 3 | 4 | 5 | 6 | 7 | 8 | Final |
| (Minnesota) Anderson / Dropkin 🔨 | 3 | 1 | 3 | 0 | 2 | 0 | 2 | X | 11 |
| (Wisconsin) (New York (state)) Bear / Stopera | 0 | 0 | 0 | 1 | 0 | 2 | 0 | X | 3 |

| Sheet 4 | 1 | 2 | 3 | 4 | 5 | 6 | 7 | 8 | Final |
| (Minnesota) Peterson / Polo 🔨 | 0 | 5 | 0 | 2 | 0 | 0 | 2 | X | 9 |
| (Minnesota) Rhyme / Smith | 1 | 0 | 1 | 0 | 1 | 1 | 0 | X | 4 |

| Sheet 5 | 1 | 2 | 3 | 4 | 5 | 6 | 7 | 8 | Final |
| (Maryland) Gourianova / Clawson 🔨 | 1 | 0 | 0 | 2 | 0 | 0 | 1 | X | 4 |
| (Minnesota) Christensen / Shuster | 0 | 2 | 2 | 0 | 2 | 1 | 0 | X | 7 |

| Sheet 6 | 1 | 2 | 3 | 4 | 5 | 6 | 7 | 8 | Final |
| (Minnesota) (Washington (state)) Agre / McLean | 0 | 0 | 1 | 0 | 1 | 0 | 2 | X | 4 |
| (Wisconsin) Hamilton / Hamilton 🔨 | 1 | 1 | 0 | 4 | 0 | 1 | 0 | X | 7 |

=== Draw 2 ===
Thursday, February 27, 7:00 pm

| Sheet 1 | 1 | 2 | 3 | 4 | 5 | 6 | 7 | 8 | Final |
| (Minnesota) Christensen / Shuster | 0 | 1 | 0 | 1 | 2 | 0 | 2 | 0 | 6 |
| (Minnesota) (Washington (state)) Agre / McLean 🔨 | 2 | 0 | 2 | 0 | 0 | 1 | 0 | 2 | 7 |

| Sheet 2 | 1 | 2 | 3 | 4 | 5 | 6 | 7 | 8 | 9 | Final |
| (Minnesota) Peterson / Polo | 0 | 1 | 0 | 0 | 1 | 0 | 4 | 1 | 0 | 7 |
| (Wisconsin) Hamilton / Hamilton 🔨 | 1 | 0 | 2 | 2 | 0 | 2 | 0 | 0 | 1 | 8 |

| Sheet 3 | 1 | 2 | 3 | 4 | 5 | 6 | 7 | 8 | Final |
| (Alaska) (Minnesota) Persinger / Plys | 1 | 1 | 0 | 4 | 0 | 1 | 0 | X | 7 |
| (Minnesota) McMakin / Fenson 🔨 | 0 | 0 | 1 | 0 | 1 | 0 | 1 | X | 3 |

| Sheet 4 | 1 | 2 | 3 | 4 | 5 | 6 | 7 | 8 | Final |
| (Washington (state)) Clark / Bond | 0 | 0 | 1 | 0 | 2 | 0 | X | X | 3 |
| (Minnesota) Anderson / Dropkin 🔨 | 1 | 1 | 0 | 4 | 0 | 3 | X | X | 9 |

| Sheet 5 | 1 | 2 | 3 | 4 | 5 | 6 | 7 | 8 | Final |
| (Massachusetts) Walker / Leichter | 1 | 1 | 1 | 0 | 0 | 1 | 0 | 2 | 6 |
| (Wisconsin) (New York (state)) Bear / Stopera 🔨 | 0 | 0 | 0 | 1 | 1 | 0 | 1 | 0 | 3 |

| Sheet 6 | 1 | 2 | 3 | 4 | 5 | 6 | 7 | 8 | Final |
| (Minnesota) Rhyme / Smith 🔨 | 1 | 0 | 0 | 0 | 1 | 1 | 1 | 0 | 4 |
| (Maryland) Gourianova / Clawson | 0 | 3 | 1 | 1 | 0 | 0 | 0 | 1 | 6 |

=== Draw 3 ===
Friday, February 28, 2:30 pm

| Sheet 1 | 1 | 2 | 3 | 4 | 5 | 6 | 7 | 8 | Final |
| (Minnesota) Rhyme / Smith 🔨 | 1 | 0 | 0 | 0 | 1 | 1 | 1 | 1 | 5 |
| (Wisconsin) Hamilton / Hamilton | 0 | 1 | 1 | 2 | 0 | 0 | 0 | 0 | 4 |

| Sheet 2 | 1 | 2 | 3 | 4 | 5 | 6 | 7 | 8 | Final |
| (Maryland) Gourianova / Clawson | 0 | 1 | 1 | 2 | 0 | 1 | 0 | X | 5 |
| (Minnesota) (Washington (state)) Agre / McLean 🔨 | 2 | 0 | 0 | 0 | 1 | 0 | 1 | X | 4 |

| Sheet 3 | 1 | 2 | 3 | 4 | 5 | 6 | 7 | 8 | Final |
| (Massachusetts) Walker / Leichter 🔨 | 1 | 3 | 1 | 0 | 2 | 0 | 0 | X | 7 |
| (Washington (state)) Clark / Bond | 0 | 0 | 0 | 2 | 0 | 2 | 1 | X | 5 |

| Sheet 4 | 1 | 2 | 3 | 4 | 5 | 6 | 7 | 8 | Final |
| (Alaska) (Minnesota) Persinger / Plys 🔨 | 4 | 0 | 2 | 0 | 2 | 0 | 4 | X | 12 |
| (Wisconsin) (New York (state)) Bear / Stopera | 0 | 2 | 0 | 2 | 0 | 3 | 0 | X | 7 |

| Sheet 5 | 1 | 2 | 3 | 4 | 5 | 6 | 7 | 8 | Final |
| (Minnesota) McMakin / Fenson | 0 | 0 | 1 | 1 | 0 | 1 | 1 | 0 | 4 |
| (Minnesota) Anderson / Dropkin 🔨 | 3 | 1 | 0 | 0 | 1 | 0 | 0 | 1 | 6 |

| Sheet 6 | 1 | 2 | 3 | 4 | 5 | 6 | 7 | 8 | Final |
| (Minnesota) Peterson / Polo 🔨 | 3 | 1 | 0 | 1 | 0 | 0 | 0 | 1 | 6 |
| (Minnesota) Christensen / Shuster | 0 | 0 | 1 | 0 | 2 | 1 | 1 | 0 | 5 |

=== Draw 4 ===
Friday, February 28, 7:00 pm

| Sheet 1 | 1 | 2 | 3 | 4 | 5 | 6 | 7 | 8 | Final |
| (Maryland) Gourianova / Clawson 🔨 | 5 | 0 | 1 | 1 | 1 | X | X | X | 8 |
| (Minnesota) Peterson / Polo | 0 | 1 | 0 | 0 | 0 | X | X | X | 1 |

| Sheet 2 | 1 | 2 | 3 | 4 | 5 | 6 | 7 | 8 | Final |
| (Minnesota) Anderson / Dropkin 🔨 | 1 | 1 | 0 | 0 | 2 | 1 | 0 | 2 | 7 |
| (Alaska) (Minnesota) Persinger / Plys | 0 | 0 | 3 | 1 | 0 | 0 | 2 | 0 | 6 |

| Sheet 3 | 1 | 2 | 3 | 4 | 5 | 6 | 7 | 8 | Final |
| (Wisconsin) Hamilton / Hamilton | 0 | 1 | 1 | 0 | 0 | 1 | 0 | X | 3 |
| (Minnesota) Christensen / Shuster 🔨 | 2 | 0 | 0 | 1 | 1 | 0 | 3 | X | 7 |

| Sheet 4 | 1 | 2 | 3 | 4 | 5 | 6 | 7 | 8 | 9 | Final |
| (Minnesota) McMakin / Fenson 🔨 | 1 | 0 | 3 | 1 | 0 | 3 | 0 | 1 | 0 | 9 |
| (Massachusetts) Walker / Leichter | 0 | 3 | 0 | 0 | 2 | 0 | 4 | 0 | 1 | 10 |

| Sheet 5 | 1 | 2 | 3 | 4 | 5 | 6 | 7 | 8 | Final |
| (Minnesota) (Washington (state)) Agre / McLean 🔨 | 0 | 1 | 0 | 0 | 3 | 0 | 2 | 0 | 6 |
| (Minnesota) Rhyme / Smith | 1 | 0 | 2 | 1 | 0 | 2 | 0 | 1 | 7 |

| Sheet 6 | 1 | 2 | 3 | 4 | 5 | 6 | 7 | 8 | Final |
| (Wisconsin) (New York (state)) Bear / Stopera 🔨 | 3 | 1 | 0 | 0 | 3 | 0 | 0 | 1 | 8 |
| (Washington (state)) Clark / Bond | 0 | 0 | 1 | 1 | 0 | 3 | 1 | 0 | 6 |

=== Draw 5 ===
Saturday, February 29, 10:00 am

| Sheet 1 | 1 | 2 | 3 | 4 | 5 | 6 | 7 | 8 | Final |
| (Wisconsin) (New York (state)) Bear / Stopera | 2 | 1 | 1 | 1 | 2 | 0 | X | X | 7 |
| (Minnesota) McMakin / Fenson 🔨 | 0 | 0 | 0 | 0 | 0 | 1 | X | X | 1 |

| Sheet 2 | 1 | 2 | 3 | 4 | 5 | 6 | 7 | 8 | Final |
| (Minnesota) Christensen / Shuster | 2 | 0 | 2 | 1 | 0 | 3 | X | X | 8 |
| (Minnesota) Rhyme / Smith 🔨 | 0 | 1 | 0 | 0 | 1 | 0 | X | X | 2 |

| Sheet 3 | 1 | 2 | 3 | 4 | 5 | 6 | 7 | 8 | 9 | Final |
| (Minnesota) (Washington (state)) Agre / McLean 🔨 | 0 | 2 | 0 | 1 | 0 | 1 | 0 | 1 | 0 | 5 |
| (Minnesota) Peterson / Polo | 1 | 0 | 1 | 0 | 1 | 0 | 2 | 0 | 1 | 6 |

| Sheet 4 | 1 | 2 | 3 | 4 | 5 | 6 | 7 | 8 | Final |
| (Wisconsin) Hamilton / Hamilton 🔨 | 4 | 1 | 2 | 1 | X | X | X | X | 8 |
| (Maryland) Gourianova / Clawson | 0 | 0 | 0 | 0 | X | X | X | X | 0 |

| Sheet 5 | 1 | 2 | 3 | 4 | 5 | 6 | 7 | 8 | Final |
| (Washington (state)) Clark / Bond | 0 | 0 | 1 | 0 | 1 | 0 | 1 | X | 3 |
| (Alaska) (Minnesota) Persinger / Plys 🔨 | 1 | 1 | 0 | 2 | 0 | 1 | 0 | X | 5 |

| Sheet 6 | 1 | 2 | 3 | 4 | 5 | 6 | 7 | 8 | Final |
| (Minnesota) Anderson / Dropkin | 2 | 1 | 0 | 2 | 0 | 3 | X | X | 8 |
| (Massachusetts) Walker / Leichter 🔨 | 0 | 0 | 2 | 0 | 1 | 0 | X | X | 3 |

== Tiebreaker ==
Saturday, February 29, 2:30 pm

| Sheet 2 | 1 | 2 | 3 | 4 | 5 | 6 | 7 | 8 | Final |
| (Minnesota) Peterson / Polo | 2 | 0 | 3 | 0 | 2 | 0 | 3 | X | 10 |
| (Maryland) Gourianova / Clawson 🔨 | 0 | 2 | 0 | 2 | 0 | 1 | 0 | X | 5 |

== Playoffs ==
Quarterfinals
3 | (Alaska) (Minnesota) Persinger / Plys | 7
6 | (Minnesota) Peterson / Polo | 10
4 | (Wisconsin) Hamilton / Hamilton | 6
5 | (Massachusetts) Walker / Leichter | 7

Semifinals
1 | (Minnesota) Anderson / Dropkin | 5
6 | (Minnesota) Peterson / Polo | 8
2 | (Minnesota) Christensen / Shuster | 9
5 | (Massachusetts) Walker / Leichter | 6

Final
6 | (Minnesota) Peterson / Polo | 7
2 | (Minnesota) Christensen / Shuster | 4
Bronze medal game
1 | (Minnesota) Anderson / Dropkin | 7
5 | (Massachusetts) Walker / Leichter | 6

=== Quarterfinals ===
Saturday, February 29, 7:00 pm

| Sheet 3 | 1 | 2 | 3 | 4 | 5 | 6 | 7 | 8 | Final |
| (Wisconsin) Hamilton / Hamilton 🔨 | 0 | 0 | 3 | 0 | 2 | 0 | 1 | 0 | 6 |
| (Massachusetts) Walker / Leichter | 2 | 1 | 0 | 1 | 0 | 1 | 0 | 2 | 7 |

| Sheet 4 | 1 | 2 | 3 | 4 | 5 | 6 | 7 | 8 | Final |
| (Alaska) (Minnesota) Persinger / Plys | 1 | 2 | 0 | 2 | 0 | 2 | 0 | 0 | 7 |
| (Minnesota) Peterson / Polo 🔨 | 0 | 0 | 3 | 0 | 1 | 0 | 3 | 3 | 10 |

=== Semifinals ===
Sunday, March 1, 11:00 am

| Team | 1 | 2 | 3 | 4 | 5 | 6 | 7 | 8 | Final |
| (Minnesota) Anderson / Dropkin | 0 | 0 | 2 | 0 | 1 | 0 | 2 | X | 5 |
| (Minnesota) Peterson / Polo 🔨 | 2 | 1 | 0 | 2 | 0 | 3 | 0 | X | 8 |

| Team | 1 | 2 | 3 | 4 | 5 | 6 | 7 | 8 | Final |
| (Minnesota) Christensen / Shuster | 2 | 0 | 1 | 0 | 2 | 0 | 3 | 1 | 9 |
| (Massachusetts) Walker / Leichter 🔨 | 0 | 3 | 0 | 1 | 0 | 2 | 0 | 0 | 6 |

=== Bronze medal game ===
Sunday, March 1, 3:30 pm

| Team | 1 | 2 | 3 | 4 | 5 | 6 | 7 | 8 | 9 | Final |
| (Minnesota) Anderson / Dropkin 🔨 | 3 | 2 | 0 | 0 | 1 | 0 | 0 | 0 | 1 | 7 |
| (Massachusetts) Walker / Leichter | 0 | 0 | 1 | 1 | 0 | 1 | 2 | 1 | 0 | 6 |

=== Final ===
Sunday, March 1, 3:30 pm

| Team | 1 | 2 | 3 | 4 | 5 | 6 | 7 | 8 | Final |
| (Minnesota) Peterson / Polo 🔨 | 1 | 2 | 0 | 3 | 0 | 1 | 0 | X | 7 |
| (Minnesota) Christensen / Shuster | 0 | 0 | 1 | 0 | 2 | 0 | 1 | X | 4 |
