= 2022 National =

Grand Slam of Curling event

2022 BOOST National
- Host city: North Bay, Ontario
- Arena: North Bay Memorial Gardens
- Dates: October 4–9
- Men's winner: (Newfoundland and Labrador) Team Gushue
- Curling club: St. John's CC, St. John's
- Skip: Brad Gushue
- Third: Mark Nichols
- Second: E. J. Harnden
- Lead: Geoff Walker
- Coach: Caleb Flaxey
- Finalist: (Sweden) Niklas Edin
- Women's winner: (Switzerland) Team Tirinzoni
- Curling club: CC Aarau, Aarau
- Skip: Silvana Tirinzoni
- Fourth: Alina Pätz
- Second: Carole Howald
- Lead: Briar Schwaller-Hürlimann
- Coach: Pierre Charette
- Finalist: (Manitoba) Kerri Einarson

The 2022 BOOST National was held from October 4 to 9 at the North Bay Memorial Gardens in North Bay, Ontario. It was the first Grand Slam event of the 2022–23 curling season.

== Qualification ==
The top 16 ranked men's and women's teams on the World Curling Federation's world team rankings as of September 5, 2022 qualified for the event. In the event that a team declines their invitation, the next-ranked team on the world team ranking is invited until the field is complete.

=== Men ===
Top world team ranking men's teams:

1. (Newfoundland and Labrador) Brad Gushue
2. (Sweden) Niklas Edin
3. (Scotland) Bruce Mouat
4. (Alberta) Brendan Bottcher
5. (Italy) Joël Retornaz
6. (Manitoba) Matt Dunstone
7. (Scotland) Ross Whyte
8. (Alberta) Kevin Koe
9. (Saskatchewan) Colton Flasch
10. (Manitoba) Reid Carruthers
11. (Switzerland) Yannick Schwaller
12. (Switzerland) Marco Hösli
13. (Ontario) Glenn Howard
14. (Switzerland) Michael Brunner
15. (Norway) ~~Steffen Walstad~~
16. (United States) Korey Dropkin
17. (Manitoba) Mike McEwen

=== Women ===
Top world team ranking women's teams:

1. (Sweden) Anna Hasselborg
2. (Manitoba) Kerri Einarson
3. (Manitoba) Kaitlyn Lawes
4. (Japan) Satsuki Fujisawa
5. (Switzerland) Silvana Tirinzoni
6. (Ontario) Tracy Fleury
7. (South Korea) Kim Eun-jung
8. (South Korea) Gim Eun-ji
9. (Manitoba) Chelsea Carey
10. (Manitoba) Jennifer Jones
11. (Sweden) Isabella Wranå
12. (Germany) Daniela Jentsch
13. (United States) Tabitha Peterson
14. (Ontario) Hollie Duncan
15. (Ontario) Krista McCarville
16. (Switzerland) Raphaela Keiser

== Men ==
=== Teams ===
The teams are listed as follows:

Skip	Third	Second	Lead	Alternate	Locale
Brendan Bottcher	Marc Kennedy	Brett Gallant	Ben Hebert		Calgary, Alberta
Michael Brunner	Romano Meier	Anthony Petoud	Marcel Käufeler		Bern, Switzerland
Reid Carruthers	Jason Gunnlaugson	Derek Samagalski	Connor Njegovan		Winnipeg, Manitoba
Korey Dropkin	Andrew Stopera	Mark Fenner	Thomas Howell	Ben Richardson	(United States) Duluth, Minnesota
Matt Dunstone	B. J. Neufeld	Colton Lott	Ryan Harnden		Winnipeg, Manitoba
Niklas Edin	Oskar Eriksson	Rasmus Wranå	Christoffer Sundgren		Karlstad, Sweden
Colton Flasch	Catlin Schneider	Kevin Marsh	Dan Marsh		Saskatoon, Saskatchewan
Brad Gushue	Mark Nichols	E. J. Harnden	Geoff Walker		St. John's, Newfoundland and Labrador
Philipp Hösli (Note: Andreas Gerlach spared for Marco Hösli. He played second while Marco Hefti and Philipp Hösli each moved up the lineup one position.)	Marco Hefti	Andreas Gerlach	Justin Hausherr		Glarus, Switzerland
Glenn Howard	Scott Howard	David Mathers	Tim March		Penetanguishene, Ontario
Kevin Koe	Tyler Tardi	Brad Thiessen	Karrick Martin		Calgary, Alberta
Mike McEwen	Ryan Fry	Jonathan Beuk	Brent Laing		Toronto, Ontario
Bruce Mouat	Grant Hardie	Bobby Lammie	Hammy McMillan Jr.		Stirling, Scotland
Joël Retornaz	Amos Mosaner	Sebastiano Arman	Mattia Giovanella		Trentino, Italy
Benoît Schwarz (Fourth)	Yannick Schwaller (Skip)	Sven Michel	Pablo Lachat		Geneva, Switzerland
Ross Whyte	Robin Brydone	Duncan McFadzean	Euan Kyle		Stirling, Scotland

=== Round-robin standings ===
Final round-robin standings

Key
Teams to Playoffs
Teams to Tiebreakers

Pool A	W	L	PF	PA
(Newfoundland and Labrador) Brad Gushue	4	0	25	18
(Switzerland) Team Hösli	2	2	23	23
(Ontario) Mike McEwen	1	3	21	27
(Italy) Joël Retornaz	0	4	16	26

Pool D	W	L	PF	PA
(Alberta) Brendan Bottcher	3	1	21	18
(Alberta) Kevin Koe	3	1	24	19
(Saskatchewan) Colton Flasch	2	2	24	20
(Ontario) Glenn Howard	1	3	25	28

Pool B	W	L	PF	PA
(Sweden) Niklas Edin	4	0	26	17
(Manitoba) Matt Dunstone	3	1	26	20
(United States) Korey Dropkin	3	1	20	13
(Switzerland) Yannick Schwaller	1	3	22	22

Pool C	W	L	PF	PA
(Switzerland) Michael Brunner	2	2	23	25
(Scotland) Bruce Mouat	1	3	14	21
(Manitoba) Reid Carruthers	1	3	16	26
(Scotland) Ross Whyte	1	3	19	22

=== Round-robin results ===
All draw times are listed in Eastern Time (UTC−04:00).

==== Draw 2 ====
Tuesday, October 4, 11:30 am

Sheet A	1	2	3	4	5	6	7	8	Final
(Alberta) Brendan Bottcher 🔨	0	1	0	3	0	0	0	1	5
(Ontario) Mike McEwen	1	0	1	0	0	2	0	0	4

Sheet B	1	2	3	4	5	6	7	8	Final
(Italy) Joël Retornaz	0	1	0	0	1	0	2	0	4
(Saskatchewan) Colton Flasch 🔨	1	0	1	1	0	2	0	2	7

Sheet C	1	2	3	4	5	6	7	8	9	Final
(Alberta) Kevin Koe	0	1	0	1	1	1	0	1	1	6
(Switzerland) Team Hösli 🔨	2	0	2	0	0	0	1	0	0	5

Sheet D	1	2	3	4	5	6	7	8	Final
(Newfoundland and Labrador) Brad Gushue	0	2	0	2	0	2	0	1	7
(Ontario) Glenn Howard 🔨	1	0	1	0	2	0	2	0	6

==== Draw 4 ====
Tuesday, October 4, 6:30 pm

Sheet A	1	2	3	4	5	6	7	8	Final
(Manitoba) Reid Carruthers 🔨	2	0	1	0	2	0	1	0	6
(Switzerland) Yannick Schwaller	0	1	0	2	0	1	0	1	5

Sheet B	1	2	3	4	5	6	7	8	Final
(Sweden) Niklas Edin 🔨	2	0	0	0	0	1	1	X	4
(Scotland) Bruce Mouat	0	0	0	1	0	0	0	X	1

Sheet C	1	2	3	4	5	6	7	8	Final
(Switzerland) Michael Brunner	0	2	1	0	0	3	1	X	7
(United States) Korey Dropkin 🔨	1	0	0	2	0	0	0	X	3

Sheet D	1	2	3	4	5	6	7	8	9	Final
(Manitoba) Matt Dunstone 🔨	0	0	1	0	0	1	0	2	1	5
(Scotland) Ross Whyte	0	0	0	2	0	0	2	0	0	4

==== Draw 5 ====
Wednesday, October 5, 8:30 am

Sheet A	1	2	3	4	5	6	7	8	Final
(Newfoundland and Labrador) Brad Gushue	0	3	0	3	0	1	1	0	8
(Alberta) Kevin Koe 🔨	2	0	2	0	1	0	0	1	6

Sheet B	1	2	3	4	5	6	7	8	Final
(Switzerland) Team Hösli	1	0	1	0	3	0	0	2	7
(Ontario) Glenn Howard 🔨	0	1	0	1	0	2	2	0	6

Sheet C	1	2	3	4	5	6	7	8	Final
(Alberta) Brendan Bottcher	0	0	2	0	2	0	2	0	6
(Italy) Joël Retornaz 🔨	0	1	0	1	0	1	0	2	5

Sheet D	1	2	3	4	5	6	7	8	Final
(Saskatchewan) Colton Flasch	2	1	4	0	0	3	X	X	10
(Ontario) Mike McEwen 🔨	0	0	0	0	4	0	X	X	4

==== Draw 7 ====
Wednesday, October 5, 4:00 pm

Sheet A	1	2	3	4	5	6	7	8	Final
(Scotland) Ross Whyte 🔨	0	0	0	0	2	0	1	0	3
(United States) Korey Dropkin	1	1	0	1	0	1	0	1	5

Sheet B	1	2	3	4	5	6	7	8	9	Final
(Manitoba) Matt Dunstone	0	2	0	1	0	2	0	2	0	7
(Switzerland) Michael Brunner 🔨	2	0	2	0	2	0	1	0	2	9

Sheet C	1	2	3	4	5	6	7	8	Final
(Scotland) Bruce Mouat	0	0	2	0	3	1	0	1	7
(Switzerland) Yannick Schwaller 🔨	2	0	0	1	0	0	2	0	5

Sheet D	1	2	3	4	5	6	7	8	9	Final
(Sweden) Niklas Edin	1	0	1	0	2	0	2	0	1	7
(Manitoba) Reid Carruthers 🔨	0	1	0	1	0	1	0	3	0	6

==== Draw 9 ====
Thursday, October 6, 8:30 am

Sheet A	1	2	3	4	5	6	7	8	Final
(Scotland) Bruce Mouat	0	0	0	1	0	0	2	0	3
(Manitoba) Matt Dunstone 🔨	1	0	0	0	1	3	0	2	7

Sheet B	1	2	3	4	5	6	7	8	Final
(Manitoba) Reid Carruthers	0	0	0	0	0	X	X	X	0
(United States) Korey Dropkin 🔨	2	1	3	0	1	X	X	X	7

Sheet C	1	2	3	4	5	6	7	8	9	Final
(Sweden) Niklas Edin	0	2	0	0	2	1	0	0	1	6
(Scotland) Ross Whyte 🔨	1	0	1	0	0	0	2	1	0	5

Sheet D	1	2	3	4	5	6	7	8	Final
(Switzerland) Yannick Schwaller 🔨	1	0	2	1	0	1	1	X	6
(Switzerland) Michael Brunner	0	1	0	0	1	0	0	X	2

==== Draw 11 ====
Thursday, October 6, 4:00 pm

Sheet A	1	2	3	4	5	6	7	8	Final
(Saskatchewan) Colton Flasch	0	0	1	0	1	0	2	X	4
(Switzerland) Team Hösli 🔨	1	1	0	2	0	3	0	X	7

Sheet B	1	2	3	4	5	6	7	8	Final
(Newfoundland and Labrador) Brad Gushue	0	0	2	0	1	0	1	1	5
(Alberta) Brendan Bottcher 🔨	0	1	0	1	0	1	0	0	3

Sheet C	1	2	3	4	5	6	7	8	Final
(Ontario) Glenn Howard	0	2	0	2	0	1	0	0	5
(Ontario) Mike McEwen 🔨	2	0	1	0	1	0	0	5	9

Sheet D	1	2	3	4	5	6	7	8	Final
(Italy) Joël Retornaz	0	0	0	0	0	0	2	X	2
(Alberta) Kevin Koe 🔨	2	0	1	1	0	1	0	X	5

==== Draw 14 ====
Friday, October 7, 12:00 pm

Sheet A	1	2	3	4	5	6	7	8	Final
(Sweden) Niklas Edin 🔨	2	1	0	0	2	0	4	X	9
(Switzerland) Michael Brunner	0	0	3	1	0	1	0	X	5

Sheet B	1	2	3	4	5	6	7	8	Final
(Scotland) Ross Whyte	0	1	0	1	0	2	0	3	7
(Switzerland) Yannick Schwaller 🔨	2	0	2	0	1	0	1	0	6

Sheet C	1	2	3	4	5	6	7	8	Final
(Manitoba) Matt Dunstone	0	2	0	0	1	2	1	1	7
(Manitoba) Reid Carruthers 🔨	2	0	0	2	0	0	0	0	4

Sheet D	1	2	3	4	5	6	7	8	Final
(Scotland) Bruce Mouat 🔨	1	0	1	0	1	0	0	X	3
(United States) Korey Dropkin	0	2	0	0	0	0	3	X	5

==== Draw 16 ====
Friday, October 7, 8:00 pm

Sheet A	1	2	3	4	5	6	7	8	Final
(Italy) Joël Retornaz 🔨	0	2	0	1	0	0	2	0	5
(Ontario) Glenn Howard	0	0	1	0	3	1	0	3	8

Sheet B	1	2	3	4	5	6	7	8	Final
(Alberta) Kevin Koe	0	1	0	0	2	0	4	X	7
(Ontario) Mike McEwen 🔨	2	0	0	1	0	1	0	X	4

Sheet C	1	2	3	4	5	6	7	8	Final
(Newfoundland and Labrador) Brad Gushue	0	1	0	2	0	1	1	X	5
(Saskatchewan) Colton Flasch 🔨	1	0	1	0	1	0	0	X	3

Sheet D	1	2	3	4	5	6	7	8	Final
(Alberta) Brendan Bottcher 🔨	2	0	0	0	4	0	1	X	7
(Switzerland) Team Hösli	0	1	0	0	0	3	0	X	4

=== Tiebreaker ===
Saturday, October 8, 8:00 am

Sheet A	1	2	3	4	5	6	7	8	Final
(Saskatchewan) Colton Flasch 🔨	0	2	1	0	0	2	1	X	6
(Switzerland) Team Hösli	1	0	0	1	1	0	0	X	3

Player percentages
(Saskatchewan) Team Flasch		(Switzerland) Team Hösli	
Dan Marsh	95%	Justin Hausherr	91%
Kevin Marsh	91%	Andreas Gerlach	81%
Catlin Schneider	84%	Marco Hefti	78%
Colton Flasch	75%	Philipp Hösli	73%
Total	86%	Total	81%

=== Playoffs ===
Quarterfinals
1	(Sweden) Niklas Edin	9
8	(Saskatchewan) Colton Flasch	1
4	(Manitoba) Matt Dunstone	6
5	(Alberta) Kevin Koe	5
2	(Newfoundland and Labrador) Brad Gushue	9
7	(Switzerland) Michael Brunner	6
3	(Alberta) Brendan Bottcher	5
6	(United States) Korey Dropkin	7

Semifinals
1	(Sweden) Niklas Edin	4
4	(Manitoba) Matt Dunstone	3
2	(Newfoundland and Labrador) Brad Gushue	11
6	(United States) Korey Dropkin	0

Final
1	(Sweden) Niklas Edin	4
2	(Newfoundland and Labrador) Brad Gushue	5

==== Quarterfinals ====
Saturday, October 8, 4:00 pm

Sheet A	1	2	3	4	5	6	7	8	Final
(Manitoba) Matt Dunstone 🔨	0	2	0	0	2	0	0	2	6
(Alberta) Kevin Koe	0	0	2	1	0	1	1	0	5

Player percentages
(Manitoba) Team Dunstone		(Alberta) Team Koe	
Ryan Harnden	100%	Karrick Martin	94%
Colton Lott	91%	Brad Thiessen	86%
B. J. Neufeld	91%	Tyler Tardi	95%
Matt Dunstone	89%	Kevin Koe	94%
Total	93%	Total	92%

Sheet B	1	2	3	4	5	6	7	8	9	Final
(Alberta) Brendan Bottcher 🔨	1	0	0	1	0	1	0	2	0	5
(United States) Korey Dropkin	0	0	1	0	2	0	2	0	2	7

Player percentages
(Alberta) Team Bottcher		(United States) Team Dropkin	
Ben Hebert	97%	Ben Richardson	94%
Brett Gallant	92%	Mark Fenner	78%
Marc Kennedy	90%	Andrew Stopera	81%
Brendan Bottcher	83%	Korey Dropkin	96%
Total	91%	Total	87%

Sheet C	1	2	3	4	5	6	7	8	Final
(Sweden) Niklas Edin 🔨	1	0	2	1	5	X	X	X	9
(Saskatchewan) Colton Flasch	0	1	0	0	0	X	X	X	1

Player percentages
(Sweden) Team Edin		(Saskatchewan) Team Flasch	
Christoffer Sundgren	95%	Dan Marsh	90%
Rasmus Wranå	78%	Kevin Marsh	63%
Oskar Eriksson	90%	Catlin Schneider	73%
Niklas Edin	95%	Colton Flasch	63%
Total	89%	Total	72%

Sheet D	1	2	3	4	5	6	7	8	Final
(Newfoundland and Labrador) Brad Gushue 🔨	3	0	2	0	2	2	0	X	9
(Switzerland) Michael Brunner	0	3	0	2	0	0	1	X	6

Player percentages
(Newfoundland and Labrador) Team Gushue		(Switzerland) Team Brunner	
Geoff Walker	75%	Marcel Käufeler	93%
E. J. Harnden	70%	Anthony Petoud	79%
Mark Nichols	84%	Romano Meier	80%
Brad Gushue	84%	Michael Brunner	71%
Total	78%	Total	81%

==== Semifinals ====
Saturday, October 8, 8:00 pm

Sheet C	1	2	3	4	5	6	7	8	Final
(Newfoundland and Labrador) Brad Gushue 🔨	2	4	1	2	2	X	X	X	11
(United States) Korey Dropkin	0	0	0	0	0	X	X	X	0

Player percentages
(Newfoundland and Labrador) Team Gushue		(United States) Team Dropkin	
Geoff Walker	80%	Ben Richardson	98%
E. J. Harnden	65%	Mark Fenner	90%
Mark Nichols	88%	Andrew Stopera	78%
Brad Gushue	100%	Korey Dropkin	33%
Total	83%	Total	74%

Sheet D	1	2	3	4	5	6	7	8	9	Final
(Sweden) Niklas Edin 🔨	2	0	0	0	0	1	0	0	1	4
(Manitoba) Matt Dunstone	0	0	0	1	0	0	0	2	0	3

Player percentages
(Sweden) Team Edin		(Manitoba) Team Dunstone	
Christoffer Sundgren	96%	Ryan Harnden	94%
Rasmus Wranå	89%	Colton Lott	86%
Oskar Eriksson	88%	B. J. Neufeld	83%
Niklas Edin	92%	Matt Dunstone	96%
Total	91%	Total	90%

==== Final ====
Sunday, October 9, 3:00 pm

Sheet B	1	2	3	4	5	6	7	8	9	Final
(Sweden) Niklas Edin 🔨	0	0	1	0	2	0	0	1	0	4
(Newfoundland and Labrador) Brad Gushue	1	0	0	1	0	1	1	0	1	5

Player percentages
(Sweden) Team Edin		(Newfoundland and Labrador) Team Gushue	
Christoffer Sundgren	88%	Geoff Walker	85%
Rasmus Wranå	81%	E. J. Harnden	82%
Oskar Eriksson	86%	Mark Nichols	88%
Niklas Edin	69%	Brad Gushue	88%
Total	81%	Total	86%

== Women ==
=== Teams ===
The teams are listed as follows:

Skip	Third	Second	Lead	Alternate	Locale
Chelsea Carey	Jamie Sinclair (Note: Alternate Jamie Sinclair replaced Rachel Erickson. She played third while Jolene Campbell moved to lead.)	Liz Fyfe	Jolene Campbell		Winnipeg, Manitoba
Hollie Duncan	Sherry Middaugh (Note: Sherry Middaugh spared for Megan Balsdon.)	Rachelle Strybosch	Tess Bobbie		Woodstock, Ontario
Kerri Einarson	Val Sweeting	Shannon Birchard	Briane Harris		Gimli, Manitoba
Rachel Homan (Fourth)	Tracy Fleury (Skip)	Emma Miskew	Sarah Wilkes		Ottawa, Ontario
Satsuki Fujisawa	Chinami Yoshida	Yumi Suzuki	Yurika Yoshida		Kitami, Japan
Gim Eun-ji	Kim Min-ji	Kim Su-ji	Seol Ye-eun	Seol Ye-ji	Uijeongbu, South Korea
Anna Hasselborg	Sara McManus	Agnes Knochenhauer	Sofia Mabergs		Sundbyberg, Sweden
Daniela Jentsch	Emira Abbes	Mia Höhne	Analena Jentsch		Füssen, Germany
Jennifer Jones	Karlee Burgess	Mackenzie Zacharias	Emily Zacharias	Lauren Lenentine	Winnipeg, Manitoba
Selina Witschonke (Fourth)	Raphaela Keiser (Skip)	Marina Lörtscher	– (Note: Team Keiser played with three players.)		St. Moritz, Switzerland
Kim Eun-jung	Kim Kyeong-ae	Kim Cho-hi	Kim Seon-yeong	Kim Yeong-mi	Gangneung, South Korea
Kaitlyn Lawes	Selena Njegovan	Jocelyn Peterman	Kristin MacCuish		Winnipeg, Manitoba
Krista McCarville	Kendra Lilly	Ashley Sippala	Sarah Potts		Thunder Bay, Ontario
Tabitha Peterson	Cory Thiesse	Becca Hamilton	Tara Peterson		(United States) Chaska, Minnesota
Alina Pätz (Fourth)	Silvana Tirinzoni (Skip)	Carole Howald	Briar Schwaller-Hürlimann		Aarau, Switzerland
Isabella Wranå	Almida de Val	Linda Stenlund	Maria Larsson	Jennie Wåhlin	Sundbyberg, Sweden

=== Round-robin standings ===
Final round-robin standings

Key
Teams to Playoffs
Teams to Tiebreakers

Pool A	W	L	PF	PA
(Switzerland) Silvana Tirinzoni	4	0	30	14
(Switzerland) Raphaela Keiser	3	1	25	20
(Sweden) Anna Hasselborg	1	3	18	27
(Germany) Daniela Jentsch	0	4	15	29

Pool D	W	L	PF	PA
(Manitoba) Kaitlyn Lawes	2	2	22	23
(South Korea) Gim Eun-ji	2	2	28	21
(United States) Tabitha Peterson	2	2	20	18
(Manitoba) Chelsea Carey	2	2	20	26

Pool B	W	L	PF	PA
(Ontario) Team Homan	3	1	27	23
(Manitoba) Kerri Einarson	3	1	35	18
(Sweden) Isabella Wranå	2	2	27	22
(Ontario) Krista McCarville	1	3	16	21

Pool C	W	L	PF	PA
(Japan) Satsuki Fujisawa	4	0	27	16
(Manitoba) Jennifer Jones	2	2	24	25
(South Korea) Kim Eun-jung	1	3	17	30
(Ontario) Hollie Duncan	0	4	16	34

=== Round-robin results ===
All draw times are listed in Eastern Time (UTC−04:00).

==== Draw 1 ====
Tuesday, October 4, 8:00 am

Sheet A	1	2	3	4	5	6	7	8	Final
(Japan) Satsuki Fujisawa 🔨	3	0	3	2	0	1	X	X	9
(Ontario) Team Homan	0	1	0	0	2	0	X	X	3

Sheet B	1	2	3	4	5	6	7	8	Final
(Manitoba) Jennifer Jones 🔨	2	0	2	0	0	3	0	X	7
(Ontario) Krista McCarville	0	1	0	0	1	0	2	X	4

Sheet C	1	2	3	4	5	6	7	8	Final
(Manitoba) Kerri Einarson 🔨	2	1	1	6	0	X	X	X	10
(South Korea) Kim Eun-jung	0	0	0	0	1	X	X	X	1

Sheet D	1	2	3	4	5	6	7	8	Final
(Sweden) Isabella Wranå	0	1	0	2	0	3	3	X	9
(Ontario) Hollie Duncan 🔨	0	0	3	0	1	0	0	X	4

==== Draw 3 ====
Tuesday, October 4, 3:00 pm

Sheet A	1	2	3	4	5	6	7	8	Final
(Manitoba) Kaitlyn Lawes 🔨	1	1	0	2	0	1	0	0	5
(Switzerland) Raphaela Keiser	0	0	2	0	1	0	2	3	8

Sheet B	1	2	3	4	5	6	7	8	Final
(Switzerland) Silvana Tirinzoni 🔨	0	3	1	3	0	2	X	X	9
(Manitoba) Chelsea Carey	0	0	0	0	2	0	X	X	2

Sheet C	1	2	3	4	5	6	7	8	Final
(South Korea) Gim Eun-ji 🔨	1	1	0	1	1	2	0	X	6
(Germany) Daniela Jentsch	0	0	1	0	0	0	1	X	2

Sheet D	1	2	3	4	5	6	7	8	Final
(Sweden) Anna Hasselborg 🔨	0	1	0	0	0	1	1	0	3
(United States) Tabitha Peterson	1	0	2	0	1	0	0	1	5

==== Draw 6 ====
Wednesday, October 5, 12:00 pm

Sheet A	1	2	3	4	5	6	7	8	Final
(South Korea) Kim Eun-jung	0	1	0	0	1	1	4	X	7
(Ontario) Krista McCarville 🔨	1	0	1	1	0	0	0	X	3

Sheet B	1	2	3	4	5	6	7	8	Final
(Ontario) Team Homan	0	2	4	0	3	0	X	X	9
(Ontario) Hollie Duncan 🔨	2	0	0	1	0	1	X	X	4

Sheet C	1	2	3	4	5	6	7	8	Final
(Japan) Satsuki Fujisawa 🔨	2	0	0	0	0	2	0	2	6
(Sweden) Isabella Wranå	0	1	1	1	1	0	1	0	5

Sheet D	1	2	3	4	5	6	7	8	Final
(Manitoba) Kerri Einarson	2	3	0	2	0	0	3	X	10
(Manitoba) Jennifer Jones 🔨	0	0	1	0	2	1	0	X	4

==== Draw 8 ====
Wednesday, October 5, 8:00 pm

Sheet A	1	2	3	4	5	6	7	8	Final
(Switzerland) Silvana Tirinzoni 🔨	0	0	2	0	3	0	1	X	6
(United States) Tabitha Peterson	0	1	0	1	0	1	0	X	3

Sheet B	1	2	3	4	5	6	7	8	Final
(South Korea) Gim Eun-ji	0	0	1	0	3	0	2	0	6
(Switzerland) Raphaela Keiser 🔨	1	1	0	2	0	1	0	2	7

Sheet C	1	2	3	4	5	6	7	8	Final
(Sweden) Anna Hasselborg	1	1	0	2	0	1	0	1	6
(Manitoba) Chelsea Carey 🔨	0	0	1	0	2	0	1	0	4

Sheet D	1	2	3	4	5	6	7	8	Final
(Manitoba) Kaitlyn Lawes 🔨	1	0	0	2	0	3	0	X	6
(Germany) Daniela Jentsch	0	0	3	0	0	0	0	X	3

==== Draw 10 ====
Thursday, October 6, 12:00 pm

Sheet A	1	2	3	4	5	6	7	8	Final
(Manitoba) Chelsea Carey 🔨	1	5	0	0	0	2	0	0	8
(Germany) Daniela Jentsch	0	0	0	2	1	0	2	2	7

Sheet B	1	2	3	4	5	6	7	8	Final
(Sweden) Anna Hasselborg	0	1	0	2	0	0	2	X	5
(Manitoba) Kaitlyn Lawes 🔨	2	0	1	0	2	3	0	X	8

Sheet C	1	2	3	4	5	6	7	8	Final
(United States) Tabitha Peterson 🔨	1	0	1	0	1	0	0	X	3
(Switzerland) Raphaela Keiser	0	2	0	1	0	2	1	X	6

Sheet D	1	2	3	4	5	6	7	8	Final
(Switzerland) Silvana Tirinzoni 🔨	2	0	1	0	0	2	0	3	8
(South Korea) Gim Eun-ji	0	2	0	2	0	0	2	0	6

==== Draw 12 ====
Thursday, October 6, 8:00 pm

Sheet A	1	2	3	4	5	6	7	8	Final
(Manitoba) Kerri Einarson 🔨	0	0	2	0	2	0	5	X	9
(Ontario) Hollie Duncan	1	2	0	2	0	1	0	X	6

Sheet B	1	2	3	4	5	6	7	8	Final
(South Korea) Kim Eun-jung 🔨	0	2	0	0	0	1	0	X	3
(Sweden) Isabella Wranå	2	0	1	1	3	0	2	X	9

Sheet C	1	2	3	4	5	6	7	8	Final
(Ontario) Team Homan 🔨	2	0	1	1	0	0	3	X	7
(Manitoba) Jennifer Jones	0	3	0	0	1	0	0	X	4

Sheet D	1	2	3	4	5	6	7	8	Final
(Japan) Satsuki Fujisawa 🔨	0	1	0	2	0	2	0	X	5
(Ontario) Krista McCarville	0	0	1	0	0	0	1	X	2

==== Draw 13 ====
Friday, October 7, 8:30 am

Sheet A	1	2	3	4	5	6	7	8	Final
(Sweden) Anna Hasselborg	2	0	0	0	2	0	X	X	4
(South Korea) Gim Eun-ji 🔨	0	0	3	4	0	3	X	X	10

Sheet B	1	2	3	4	5	6	7	8	Final
(Germany) Daniela Jentsch	0	0	1	0	2	0	X	X	3
(United States) Tabitha Peterson 🔨	2	1	0	5	0	1	X	X	9

Sheet C	1	2	3	4	5	6	7	8	Final
(Manitoba) Kaitlyn Lawes 🔨	1	0	0	1	0	1	0	X	3
(Switzerland) Silvana Tirinzoni	0	1	4	0	1	1	0	X	7

Sheet D	1	2	3	4	5	6	7	8	Final
(Manitoba) Chelsea Carey	0	1	0	2	0	1	0	2	6
(Switzerland) Raphaela Keiser 🔨	1	0	1	0	1	0	1	0	4

==== Draw 15 ====
Friday, October 7, 4:00 pm

Sheet A	1	2	3	4	5	6	7	8	Final
(Manitoba) Jennifer Jones 🔨	2	1	0	0	2	0	3	1	9
(Sweden) Isabella Wranå	0	0	2	1	0	1	0	0	4

Sheet B	1	2	3	4	5	6	7	8	Final
(Manitoba) Kerri Einarson	0	0	2	2	0	2	0	0	6
(Japan) Satsuki Fujisawa 🔨	2	2	0	0	0	0	2	1	7

Sheet C	1	2	3	4	5	6	7	8	Final
(Ontario) Hollie Duncan	0	0	1	0	0	1	X	X	2
(Ontario) Krista McCarville 🔨	1	2	0	3	1	0	X	X	7

Sheet D	1	2	3	4	5	6	7	8	9	Final
(Ontario) Team Homan 🔨	2	0	2	0	1	0	1	0	2	8
(South Korea) Kim Eun-jung	0	1	0	1	0	2	0	2	0	6

=== Tiebreakers ===
Saturday, October 8, 8:00 am

Sheet B	1	2	3	4	5	6	7	8	Final
(Manitoba) Kaitlyn Lawes	1	0	2	0	0	4	X	X	7
(Sweden) Isabella Wranå 🔨	0	1	0	0	1	0	X	X	2

Player percentages
(Manitoba) Team Lawes		(Sweden) Team Wranå	
Kristin MacCuish	92%	Maria Larsson	81%
Jocelyn Peterman	98%	Linda Stenlund	73%
Selena Njegovan	83%	Almida de Val	69%
Kaitlyn Lawes	96%	Isabella Wranå	77%
Total	92%	Total	75%

Sheet C	1	2	3	4	5	6	7	8	Final
(Manitoba) Jennifer Jones 🔨	2	0	0	1	1	2	X	X	6
(Manitoba) Chelsea Carey	0	0	0	0	0	0	X	X	0

Player percentages
(Manitoba) Team Jones		(Manitoba) Team Carey	
Emily Zacharias	98%	Jolene Campbell	98%
Mackenzie Zacharias	88%	Liz Fyfe	73%
Karlee Burgess	94%	Jamie Sinclair	88%
Jennifer Jones	90%	Chelsea Carey	61%
Total	92%	Total	80%

Sheet D	1	2	3	4	5	6	7	8	Final
(South Korea) Gim Eun-ji 🔨	4	0	2	0	2	3	X	X	11
(United States) Tabitha Peterson	0	1	0	1	0	0	X	X	2

Player percentages
(South Korea) Team Gim		(United States) Team Peterson	
Seol Ye-eun	92%	Tara Peterson	94%
Kim Su-ji	90%	Becca Hamilton	83%
Kim Min-ji	90%	Cory Thiesse	83%
Gim Eun-ji	96%	Tabitha Peterson	48%
Total	92%	Total	77%

=== Playoffs ===
Quarterfinals
1	(Japan) Satsuki Fujisawa	7
8	(South Korea) Gim Eun-ji	5
4	(Manitoba) Kerri Einarson	6
5	(Switzerland) Raphaela Keiser	2
2	(Switzerland) Silvana Tirinzoni	7
7	(Manitoba) Jennifer Jones	3
3	(Ontario) Team Homan	4
6	(Manitoba) Kaitlyn Lawes	8

Semifinals
1	(Japan) Satsuki Fujisawa	5
4	(Manitoba) Kerri Einarson	8
2	(Switzerland) Silvana Tirinzoni	7
6	(Manitoba) Kaitlyn Lawes	5

Final
4	(Manitoba) Kerri Einarson	3
2	(Switzerland) Silvana Tirinzoni	7

==== Quarterfinals ====
Saturday, October 8, 12:00 pm

Sheet A	1	2	3	4	5	6	7	8	9	Final
(Japan) Satsuki Fujisawa 🔨	2	0	1	0	0	1	1	0	2	7
(South Korea) Gim Eun-ji	0	2	0	2	0	0	0	1	0	5

Player percentages
(Japan) Team Fujisawa		(South Korea) Team Gim	
Yurika Yoshida	89%	Seol Ye-eun	93%
Yumi Suzuki	94%	Kim Su-ji	85%
Chinami Yoshida	97%	Kim Min-ji	88%
Satsuki Fujisawa	85%	Gim Eun-ji	71%
Total	91%	Total	84%

Sheet B	1	2	3	4	5	6	7	8	Final
(Switzerland) Silvana Tirinzoni 🔨	0	1	1	0	0	1	0	4	7
(Manitoba) Jennifer Jones	0	0	0	1	1	0	1	0	3

Player percentages
(Switzerland) Team Tirinzoni		(Manitoba) Team Jones	
Briar Schwaller-Hürlimann	89%	Emily Zacharias	97%
Carole Howald	94%	Mackenzie Zacharias	81%
Silvana Tirinzoni	92%	Karlee Burgess	77%
Alina Pätz	84%	Jennifer Jones	86%
Total	90%	Total	85%

Sheet C	1	2	3	4	5	6	7	8	Final
(Ontario) Team Homan 🔨	0	1	0	2	1	0	0	X	4
(Manitoba) Kaitlyn Lawes	3	0	1	0	0	2	2	X	8

Player percentages
(Ontario) Team Homan		(Manitoba) Team Lawes	
Sarah Wilkes	80%	Kristin MacCuish	75%
Emma Miskew	75%	Jocelyn Peterman	92%
Tracy Fleury	84%	Selena Njegovan	67%
Rachel Homan	71%	Kaitlyn Lawes	68%
Total	78%	Total	75%

Sheet D	1	2	3	4	5	6	7	8	Final
(Manitoba) Kerri Einarson	0	0	2	1	0	1	2	X	6
(Switzerland) Raphaela Keiser 🔨	2	0	0	0	0	0	0	X	2

Player percentages
(Manitoba) Team Einarson		(Switzerland) Team Keiser	
Briane Harris	86%	—	
Shannon Birchard	89%	Marina Lörtscher	91%
Val Sweeting	94%	Raphaela Keiser	71%
Kerri Einarson	75%	Selina Witschonke	68%
Total	86%	Total	78%

==== Semifinals ====
Saturday, October 8, 8:00 pm

Sheet A	1	2	3	4	5	6	7	8	Final
(Switzerland) Silvana Tirinzoni 🔨	3	0	0	1	1	0	2	0	7
(Manitoba) Kaitlyn Lawes	0	1	0	0	0	3	0	1	5

Player percentages
(Switzerland) Team Tirinzoni		(Manitoba) Team Lawes	
Briar Schwaller-Hürlimann	81%	Kristin MacCuish	97%
Carole Howald	88%	Jocelyn Peterman	78%
Silvana Tirinzoni	86%	Selena Njegovan	72%
Alina Pätz	83%	Kaitlyn Lawes	73%
Total	85%	Total	80%

Sheet B	1	2	3	4	5	6	7	8	Final
(Japan) Satsuki Fujisawa 🔨	1	0	0	2	0	0	2	0	5
(Manitoba) Kerri Einarson	0	3	1	0	0	2	0	2	8

Player percentages
(Japan) Team Fujisawa		(Manitoba) Team Einarson	
Yurika Yoshida	88%	Briane Harris	89%
Yumi Suzuki	88%	Shannon Birchard	86%
Chinami Yoshida	83%	Val Sweeting	81%
Satsuki Fujisawa	64%	Kerri Einarson	89%
Total	80%	Total	86%

==== Final ====
Sunday, October 9, 11:00 am

Sheet B	1	2	3	4	5	6	7	8	Final
(Manitoba) Kerri Einarson	0	2	0	1	0	0	0	X	3
(Switzerland) Silvana Tirinzoni 🔨	2	0	2	0	1	1	1	X	7

Player percentages
(Manitoba) Team Einarson		(Switzerland) Team Tirinzoni	
Briane Harris	98%	Briar Schwaller-Hürlimann	91%
Shannon Birchard	89%	Carole Howald	71%
Val Sweeting	70%	Silvana Tirinzoni	63%
Kerri Einarson	63%	Alina Pätz	96%
Total	80%	Total	80%
