= 2019 United States Men's Curling Championship =

- Host city: Kalamazoo, Michigan
- Arena: Wings Event Center
- Dates: February 9 - 16
- Winner: (Minnesota) Team Shuster
- Curling club: Duluth Curling Club, Duluth, Minnesota
- Skip: John Shuster
- Third: Chris Plys
- Second: Matt Hamilton
- Lead: John Landsteiner
- Finalist: (Minnesota) Rich Ruohonen

The 2019 United States Men's Curling Championship was held from February 9 to 16 at the Wings Event Center in Kalamazoo, Michigan. It was held in conjunction with the 2019 United States Women's Curling Championship.

== Teams ==
Ten teams qualified to participate in the 2019 national championship.

Skip	Third	Second	Lead	Locale
Steven Birklid	Sam Galey	Matt Birklid	Nicholas Connolly	(Washington (state)) Seattle, Washington
Todd Birr	Greg Johnson	Hunter Clawson	Tom O'Connor	Blaine, Minnesota
Jed Brundidge	Jordan Brown	Evan Workin	Cameron Rittenour	St Paul, Minnesota
Brandon Corbett	Derek Corbett	Evan Jensen	Aaron Carlson	(New York (state)) Rochester, New York
Scott Dunnam	Cody Clouser	Andrew Dunnam	Daniel Dudt	Dresher, Pennsylvania
Korey Dropkin (fourth)	Thomas Howell	Mark Fenner (skip)	Alex Fenson	Chaska, Minnesota
Greg Persinger (fourth)	Rich Ruohonen (skip)	Colin Hufman	Phil Tilker	Chaska, Minnesota
John Shuster	Chris Plys	Matt Hamilton	John Landsteiner	Duluth, Minnesota
Chase Sinnett	Trevor Marquardt	Jonathon Harstad	Eli Clawson	Medfield, Massachusetts
Samuel Strouse	John Paul Munich	Andrew McDonald	Ryan Elwing	Midland, Michigan

== Round-robin standings ==
Final round-robin standings

Key
Teams to playoffs

Skip	W	L
(Minnesota) Rich Ruohonen	8	1
(Minnesota) John Shuster	8	1
(Minnesota) Todd Birr	6	3
(Minnesota) Mark Fenner	6	3
(Washington (state)) Steven Birklid	4	5
(Pennsylvania) Scott Dunnam	4	5
(New York (state)) Brandon Corbett	3	6
(Massachusetts) Chase Sinnett	3	6
(Minnesota) Jed Brundidge	2	7
(Michigan) Samuel Strouse	1	8

== Round-robin results ==
All draw times are listed in Eastern Standard Time (UTC−7)

=== Draw 1 ===
Saturday, February 9, 7:00pm

Team	1	2	3	4	5	6	7	8	9	10	Final
Samuel Strouse	0	0	0	0	2	0	0	X	X	X	2
John Shuster	3	0	0	0	0	4	2	X	X	X	9

Team	1	2	3	4	5	6	7	8	9	10	Final
Scott Dunnam	1	1	0	4	1	1	1	X	X	X	9
Steven Birklid	0	0	1	0	0	0	0	X	X	X	1

Team	1	2	3	4	5	6	7	8	9	10	Final
Chase Sinnett	0	1	0	0	3	0	0	1	0	1	6
Brandon Corbett	1	0	0	1	0	3	2	0	1	0	8

Team	1	2	3	4	5	6	7	8	9	10	Final
Jed Brundidge	0	1	0	1	0	1	0	1	X	X	4
Mark Fenner	1	0	3	0	2	0	2	0	X	X	8

Team	1	2	3	4	5	6	7	8	9	10	Final
Todd Birr	0	0	1	0	1	1	0	2	0	X	5
Rich Ruohonen	3	1	0	1	0	0	1	0	3	X	9

=== Draw 2 ===
Sunday, February 10, 8:00am

Team	1	2	3	4	5	6	7	8	9	10	Final
Jed Brundidge	1	0	1	0	0	1	0	X	X	X	3
Rich Ruohonen	0	1	0	2	3	0	3	X	X	X	9

Team	1	2	3	4	5	6	7	8	9	10	Final
Brandon Corbett	1	0	0	0	1	0	1	0	X	X	3
Mark Fenner	0	3	1	1	0	1	0	2	X	X	8

Team	1	2	3	4	5	6	7	8	9	10	Final
Todd Birr	0	0	3	0	0	2	1	1	1	1	9
Scott Dunnam	1	2	0	2	2	0	0	0	0	0	7

Team	1	2	3	4	5	6	7	8	9	10	Final
Steven Birklid	3	0	0	2	0	2	1	0	0	0	8
Samuel Strouse	0	0	3	0	2	0	0	1	0	1	7

Team	1	2	3	4	5	6	7	8	9	10	Final
John Shuster	1	2	1	1	0	3	X	X	X	X	8
Chase Sinnett	0	0	0	0	1	0	X	X	X	X	1

=== Draw 3 ===
Sunday, February 10, 4:00pm

Team	1	2	3	4	5	6	7	8	9	10	Final
Steven Birklid	0	1	0	2	0	1	0	1	0	1	6
Todd Birr	0	0	3	0	2	0	2	0	1	0	8

Team	1	2	3	4	5	6	7	8	9	10	Final
Chase Sinnett	0	2	1	0	2	1	0	2	3	X	11
Jed Brundidge	2	0	0	2	0	0	1	0	0	X	5

Team	1	2	3	4	5	6	7	8	9	10	Final
Rich Ruohonen	0	0	1	0	0	2	0	0	2	3	8
Mark Fenner	0	2	0	0	0	0	1	0	0	0	3

Team	1	2	3	4	5	6	7	8	9	10	Final
Scott Dunnam	0	2	0	1	1	0	1	X	X	X	5
John Shuster	3	0	4	0	0	2	0	X	X	X	9

Team	1	2	3	4	5	6	7	8	9	10	Final
Samuel Strouse	2	0	0	0	2	0	2	0	1	0	7
Brandon Corbett	0	0	2	0	0	4	0	1	0	1	8

=== Draw 4 ===
Monday, February 11, 9:00am

Team	1	2	3	4	5	6	7	8	9	10	11	Final
Chase Sinnett	0	1	0	0	1	0	1	2	0	1	2	8
Mark Fenner	3	0	0	1	0	1	0	0	1	0	0	6

Team	1	2	3	4	5	6	7	8	9	10	Final
Todd Birr	2	1	0	3	0	0	0	2	X	X	8
Samuel Strouse	0	0	1	0	0	2	0	0	X	X	3

Team	1	2	3	4	5	6	7	8	9	10	Final
Steven Birklid	0	0	2	0	1	0	1	0	1	X	5
John Shuster	3	0	0	2	0	3	0	1	0	X	9

Team	1	2	3	4	5	6	7	8	9	10	Final
Rich Ruohonen	0	1	2	0	0	0	1	1	0	X	5
Brandon Corbett	0	0	0	1	0	0	0	0	1	X	2

Team	1	2	3	4	5	6	7	8	9	10	Final
Scott Dunnam	1	0	1	0	3	0	1	0	0	X	6
Jed Brundidge	0	1	0	3	0	2	0	2	2	X	10

=== Draw 5 ===
Monday, February 11, 7:00pm

Team	1	2	3	4	5	6	7	8	9	10	Final
Brandon Corbett	2	0	0	1	0	0	0	1	0	X	4
Scott Dunnam	0	2	1	0	0	1	0	0	2	X	6

Team	1	2	3	4	5	6	7	8	9	10	Final
John Shuster	1	0	0	0	1	0	1	0	3	2	8
Rich Ruohonen	0	0	1	1	0	0	0	1	0	0	3

Team	1	2	3	4	5	6	7	8	9	10	Final
Samuel Strouse	0	1	1	1	1	0	3	0	0	0	7
Jed Brundidge	1	0	0	0	0	2	0	1	1	1	6

Team	1	2	3	4	5	6	7	8	9	10	11	Final
Todd Birr	0	0	1	0	3	0	0	0	1	0	1	6
Chase Sinnett	0	0	0	2	0	0	0	1	0	2	0	5

Team	1	2	3	4	5	6	7	8	9	10	Final
Steven Birklid	2	0	0	0	2	0	1	3	0	X	8
Mark Fenner	0	2	0	0	0	2	0	0	2	X	6

=== Draw 6 ===
Monday, February 12, 2:00pm

Team	1	2	3	4	5	6	7	8	9	10	Final
Rich Ruohonen	3	1	0	2	3	0	X	X	X	X	9
Samuel Strouse	0	0	1	0	0	1	X	X	X	X	2

Team	1	2	3	4	5	6	7	8	9	10	Final
Steven Birklid	1	0	1	1	0	2	1	0	0	0	6
Chase Sinnett	0	1	0	0	1	0	0	1	1	1	5

Team	1	2	3	4	5	6	7	8	9	10	11	Final
Brandon Corbett	1	0	0	0	1	0	0	1	1	1	0	5
Todd Birr	0	1	1	1	0	2	0	0	0	0	2	7

Team	1	2	3	4	5	6	7	8	9	10	Final
Mark Fenner	3	0	0	1	0	2	0	1	0	X	7
Scott Dunnam	0	1	0	0	1	0	1	0	1	X	4

Team	1	2	3	4	5	6	7	8	9	10	Final
Jed Brundidge	1	0	1	0	0	2	0	1	0	0	5
John Shuster	0	1	0	1	1	0	1	0	0	2	6

=== Draw 7 ===
Monday, February 13, 9:00am

Team	1	2	3	4	5	6	7	8	9	10	Final
Todd Birr	0	3	1	0	2	3	0	0	1	1	11
Jed Brundidge	3	0	0	1	0	0	2	1	0	0	7

Team	1	2	3	4	5	6	7	8	9	10	Final
Mark Fenner	0	1	0	3	0	2	0	3	X	X	9
John Shuster	1	0	1	0	1	0	1	0	X	X	4

Team	1	2	3	4	5	6	7	8	9	10	11	Final
Scott Dunnam	1	0	1	0	2	0	1	0	1	0	0	6
Rich Ruohonen	0	2	0	1	0	1	0	1	0	1	1	7

Team	1	2	3	4	5	6	7	8	9	10	Final
Brandon Corbett	0	0	0	0	1	0	3	0	0	X	4
Steven Birklid	2	2	1	1	0	1	0	0	2	X	9

Team	1	2	3	4	5	6	7	8	9	10	Final
Chase Sinnett	0	1	1	0	0	2	0	1	0	2	7
Samuel Strouse	3	0	0	1	1	0	0	0	1	0	6

=== Draw 8 ===
Monday, February 13, 7:00pm

Team	1	2	3	4	5	6	7	8	9	10	Final
Scott Dunnam	1	0	1	0	2	0	0	1	0	1	6
Chase Sinnett	0	2	0	1	0	0	1	0	1	0	5

Team	1	2	3	4	5	6	7	8	9	10	Final
Jed Brundidge	0	2	0	1	0	1	1	0	1	0	6
Brandon Corbett	3	0	1	0	2	0	0	2	0	1	9

Team	1	2	3	4	5	6	7	8	9	10	Final
Mark Fenner	0	2	0	1	0	2	1	1	0	2	9
Samuel Strouse	3	0	2	0	1	0	0	0	2	0	8

Team	1	2	3	4	5	6	7	8	9	10	Final
John Shuster	3	0	0	6	0	X	X	X	X	X	9
Todd Birr	0	0	1	0	2	X	X	X	X	X	3

Team	1	2	3	4	5	6	7	8	9	10	Final
Rich Ruohonen	2	0	0	5	1	0	X	X	X	X	8
Steven Birklid	0	1	0	0	0	1	X	X	X	X	2

=== Draw 9 ===
Monday, February 14, 4:00pm

Team	1	2	3	4	5	6	7	8	9	10	Final
John Shuster	1	2	1	5	X	X	X	X	X	X	9
Brandon Corbett	0	0	0	0	X	X	X	X	X	X	0

Team	1	2	3	4	5	6	7	8	9	10	11	Final
Samuel Strouse	0	1	1	0	0	0	2	0	0	1	0	5
Scott Dunnam	2	0	0	1	1	0	0	0	1	0	1	6

Team	1	2	3	4	5	6	7	8	9	10	11	Final
Jed Brundidge	0	0	2	0	2	0	2	2	0	0	1	9
Steven Birklid	0	2	0	1	0	3	0	0	1	1	0	8

Team	1	2	3	4	5	6	7	8	9	10	Final
Chase Sinnett	0	1	0	1	1	0	2	1	0	X	6
Rich Ruohonen	2	0	5	0	0	1	0	0	1	X	9

Team	1	2	3	4	5	6	7	8	9	10	Final
Mark Fenner	0	2	0	0	1	1	0	2	0	1	7
Todd Birr	2	0	0	1	0	0	1	0	0	0	4

== Playoffs ==
Page playoff system
1	(Minnesota) Rich Ruohonen	3
2	(Minnesota) John Shuster	8
3	(Minnesota) Todd Birr	5
4	(Minnesota) Mark Fenner	4

Semifinal
1	(Minnesota) Rich Ruohonen	6
3	(Minnesota) Todd Birr	5

Final
2	(Minnesota) John Shuster	8
1	(Minnesota) Rich Ruohonen	4

=== 1 vs. 2 ===
Friday, February 15, 1:00pm ET

Team	1	2	3	4	5	6	7	8	9	10	Final
(Minnesota) John Shuster	0	3	0	2	1	0	2	X	X	X	8
(Minnesota) Rich Ruohonen	1	0	1	0	0	1	0	X	X	X	3

Player percentages
(Minnesota) John Shuster		(Minnesota) Rich Ruohonen	
John Landsteiner	76%	Phil Tilker	97%
Matt Hamilton	78%	Colin Hufman	79%
Chris Plys	97%	Rich Ruohonen	67%
John Shuster	86%	Greg Persinger	64%
Total	84%	Total	77%

=== 3 vs. 4 ===
Friday, February 15, 1:00pm ET

Team	1	2	3	4	5	6	7	8	9	10	Final
(Minnesota) Mark Fenner	0	1	1	0	2	0	0	0	0	0	4
(Minnesota) Todd Birr	0	0	0	2	0	0	1	0	1	1	5

Player percentages
(Minnesota) Mark Fenner		(Minnesota) Todd Birr	
Alex Fenson	73%	Tom O'Connor	88%
Mark Fenner	66%	Hunter Clawson	67%
Thomas Howell	83%	Greg Johnson	73%
Korey Dropkin	74%	Todd Birr	77%
Total	74%	Total	76%

=== Semifinal ===
Friday, February 15, 7:00pm ET

Team	1	2	3	4	5	6	7	8	9	10	Final
(Minnesota) Rich Ruohonen	2	0	2	0	0	1	0	1	0	0	6
(Minnesota) Todd Birr	0	2	0	1	0	0	1	0	0	1	5

Player percentages
(Minnesota) Rich Ruohonen		(Minnesota) Todd Birr	
Phil Tilker	78%	Tom O'Connor	88%
Colin Hufman	84%	Hunter Clawson	77%
Rich Ruohonen	82%	Greg Johnson	76%
Greg Persinger	89%	Todd Birr	81%
Total	83%	Total	80%

=== Final ===
Saturday, February 16, 3:00 pm ET

Team	1	2	3	4	5	6	7	8	9	10	Final
(Minnesota) John Shuster	1	1	2	0	2	0	1	0	1	X	8
(Minnesota) Rich Ruohonen	0	0	0	1	0	2	0	1	0	X	4

Player percentages
(Minnesota) John Shuster		(Minnesota) Rich Ruohonen	
John Landsteiner	84%	Phil Tilker	92%
Matt Hamilton	80%	Colin Hufman	74%
Chris Plys	87%	Rich Ruohonen	80%
John Shuster	97%	Greg Persinger	74%
Total	87%	Total	80%
