= Korey Dropkin =

American curler (born 1995)

- Curler
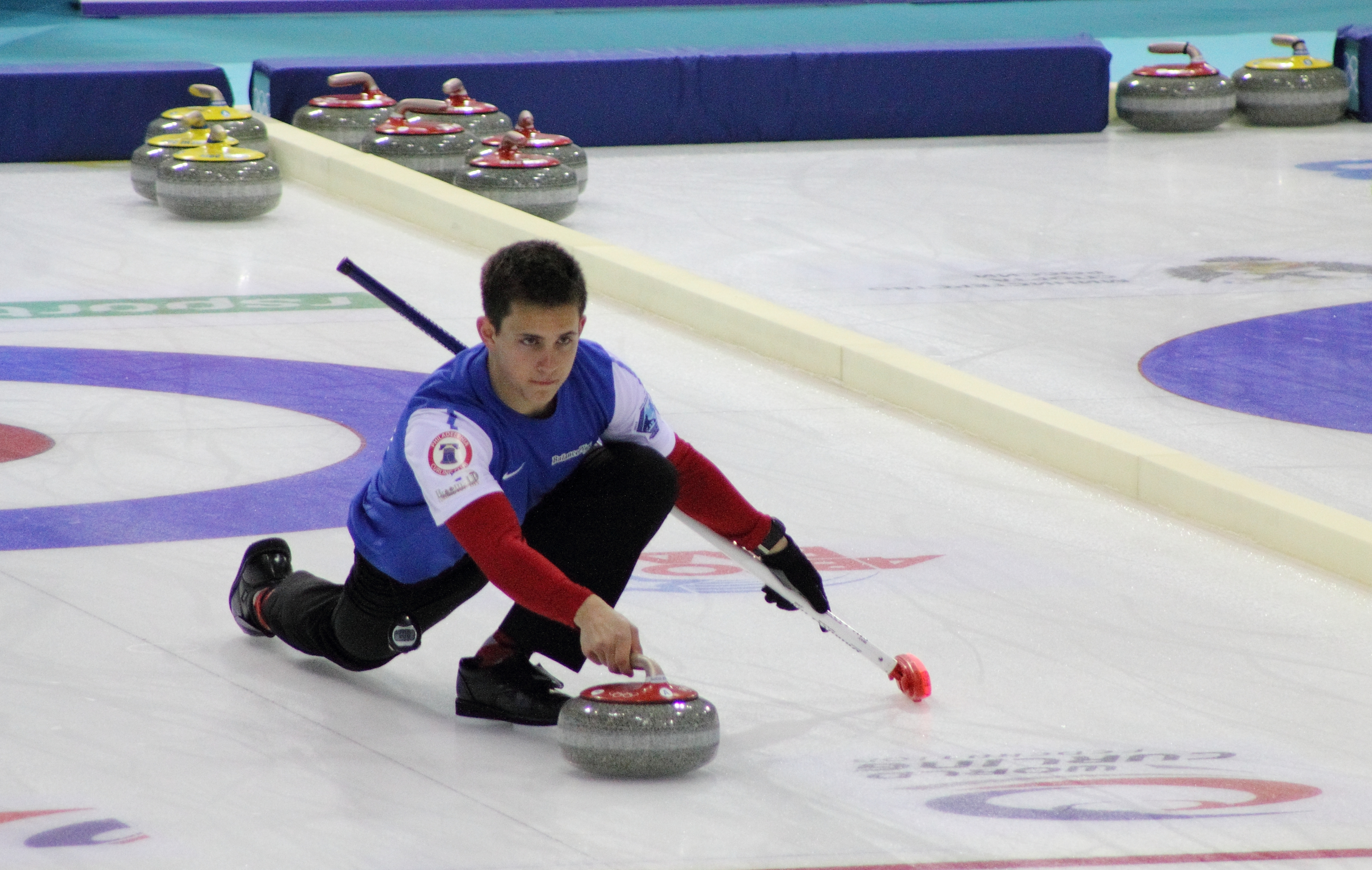
- Born: June 11, 1995 (age 31); Boston, Massachusetts, U.S.

Team
- Curling club: Duluth CC, Duluth, MN
- Mixed doubles partner: Cory Thiesse

Curling career
- Member Association: United States
- World Championship: 3 (2019, 2022, 2025)
- World Mixed Doubles Championship: 5 (2015, 2018, 2023, 2025, 2027)
- Pan Continental Championship: 2 (2022, 2023)
- Olympic: 1 (2026)
Medal record
Curling
Representing United States
Olympic Games
Silver medal – second place	2026 Milano Cortina	Mixed doubles
World Mixed Doubles Championships
Gold medal – first place	2023 Gangneung
Pan Continental Curling Championships
Bronze medal – third place	2022 Calgary	Men's team
Winter Youth Olympics
Bronze medal – third place	2012 Innsbruck	Mixed Doubles
World Junior Championships
Silver medal – second place	2016 Copenhagen	Men's team
Representing Minnesota
U.S. Olympic Trials
Gold medal – first place	2025 Lafayette	Mixed doubles
Silver medal – second place	2017 Omaha	Men's team
Silver medal – second place	2021 Omaha	Men's team
Bronze medal – third place	2021 Eveleth	Mixed doubles
U.S. Men's Championship
Gold medal – first place	2021 Wausau
Gold medal – first place	2025 Duluth
Silver medal – second place	2018 Fargo
Silver medal – second place	2024 East Rutherford
Bronze medal – third place	2023 Denver
U.S. Mixed Doubles Championship
Gold medal – first place	2015 Eau Claire
Gold medal – first place	2018 Eau Claire
Gold medal – first place	2023 Kalamazoo
Silver medal – second place	2024 Traverse City
Bronze medal – third place	2020 Bemidji

Korey Dropkin (born June 11, 1995) is an American curler originally from Southborough, Massachusetts. At the 2026 Olympics, he and Cory Thiesse became the first American team to win a medal in Olympic mixed doubles curling, winning the silver medal.

== Curling career ==
=== Juniors ===
As a junior curler, Dropkin won three United States Junior Curling Championships, playing third for his brother Stephen in 2012 and skipping in 2013 and 2016 while curling at Broomstones Curling Club in Wayland, MA. As such, he played for the United States at the World Junior Curling Championships, finishing 5th at the 2012 World Junior Curling Championships and 7th at the 2013 World Junior Curling Championships.

Dropkin was a member of the U.S. team at the 2012 Winter Youth Olympics, skipping a team that included Sarah Anderson, Thomas Howell, and Taylor Anderson. The team finished 5th at the event; after going undefeated in the round-robin, they were eliminated in the quarter-final against Italy. Dropkin did not go away from the event empty handed, as he picked up a bronze medal at the mixed doubles event with teammate Marina Verenich of Russia.

Dropkin also represented the United States at the 2013 Winter Universiade, playing lead for the Chris Plys's team. That team finished in 5th place.

=== Men's ===
On the World Curling Tour, Dropkin has been a regular at events held in the U.S., playing in his first event at the 2010 Laphroaig Scotch Open at the age of 15. Dropkin won his first Tour event by winning the 2014 Twin Cities Open.

Dropkin usually plays skip, but for two seasons from 2016 to 2018 played second for Heath McCormick. The team also included Chris Plys at third and Tom Howell at lead. During Dropkin's second season with Team McCormick, he won his first medal at the United States Men's Championship, earning silver when they lost to Greg Persinger's team in the final.

In 2019, Dropkin competed at his first World Men's Championship, as alternate for John Shuster's team. The team finished fifth, losing their first playoff game to Team Yuta Matsumura from Japan.

In 2021, Dropkin won his first United States Men's Curling Championship, which was postponed until after that year's Worlds due to the COVID-19 pandemic. The following season, he finished runner-up at the 2021 United States Olympic Curling Trials, after losing to the defending Olympic champion John Shuster rink in the final. As the 2022 US nationals were cancelled due to the pandemic, Dropkin's rink was invited to represent the US at the 2022 World Men's Curling Championship, where he led his team to a fourth place finish.

Dropkin formed a new team in the 2022-23 season, joining former junior teammates Stopera, Fenner, and Howell. The team had good success, winning a bronze medal at the 2022 Pan Continental Curling Championships, and finishing fourth in 2023. The rink won their first men's national title together at the 2025 United States Men's Curling Championship, representing USA at the 2025 World Men's Curling Championship. At the 2025 Worlds, the team went 4-8 after the round robin, finishing a disappointing 11th place.

=== Mixed doubles ===
==== Sarah Anderson (2015–2022) ====
Dropkin first played mixed doubles with Sarah Anderson, where they won the United States Mixed Doubles Championship twice, in 2015 and 2018. At the 2015 World Mixed Doubles Championship, they finished the round-robin second in their group but lost to Team Canada in the quarterfinals of the playoffs. They again made the playoffs when they returned to the Worlds in 2018, but again went winless in the playoffs, losing to Team Hungary and Team Italy to finish in 13th place. Dropkin also played with Jamie Sinclair at the 2017 United States mixed doubles curling Olympic trials, where they finished in seventh place. At the 2020 U.S. Mixed Doubles Championship, Dropkin and Anderson lost to Joe Polo and Tabitha Peterson, the eventual champions, in the semifinals, but defeated Monica Walker and Alex Leichter to win the bronze medal. Dropkin and Anderson played in the 2021 United States mixed doubles curling Olympic trials, where they finished in third, losing to Jamie Sinclair and Rich Ruohonen in the semifinal.

==== Cory Thiesse (2022–present) ====
Dropkin started playing mixed doubles with Cory Thiesse during the 2022–23 curling season, where they found immediate success, winning the 2023 United States Mixed Doubles Curling Championship over former partner Anderson and men's teammate Andrew Stopera. This qualified them to represent the United States at the 2023 World Mixed Doubles Curling Championship, where they would finish 7–2 in the round robin, and then go on to win the gold medal, beating Japan's Chiaki Matsumura and Yasumasa Tanida 8–2 in the final for the USA's first world mixed doubles gold medal. Dropkin and Thiesse would be unable to repeat their title in 2024, after losing the 2024 United States Mixed Doubles Curling Championship final to Becca Hamilton and Matt Hamilton. Their silver medal performance however, qualified them for the 2025 United States Mixed Doubles Curling Olympic Trials. At the US Olympic Trials, Thiesse and Dropkin went 8–1 in the round robin, and then went on to beat Anderson and Stopera in a best of three games final to qualify for the 2025 World Mixed Doubles Curling Championship. At the 2025 Worlds, Thiesse and Dropkin would finish in 5th place, earning enough points to directly qualify them to represent the USA at the 2026 Winter Olympics. At those Olympics he and Cory Thiesse became the first American team to win a medal in Olympic mixed doubles curling, winning the silver medal.

== Personal life ==
Dropkin attended the University of Minnesota-Duluth, and is employed as a realtor and investor in Duluth, Minnesota. He is Jewish.

== Teams ==
=== Men's ===
Season	Skip	Third	Second	Lead	Alternate	Coach	Events
2009–10	Stephen Dropkin	Korey Dropkin	Tom Howell	Ryan McMakin	Cameron Ross		2010 USJCC (4th)
2010–11	Stephen Dropkin	Korey Dropkin	Tom Howell	Derek Corbett	Cameron Ross		2011 USJCC (silver)
2011–12	Stephen Dropkin	Korey Dropkin	Tom Howell	Derek Corbett	Cameron Ross	Sandra McMakin	2012 USJCC (gold); 2012 WJCC (5th)
2012–13	Korey Dropkin	Tom Howell	Mark Fenner	Alex Fenson	Connor Hoge	Keith Dropkin	2013 USJCC (gold); 2013 WJCC (7th)
2013–14	Chris Plys	Stephen Dropkin	Sean Beighton	Korey Dropkin	Tom Howell	Phill Drobnick	2013 WUG (5th)
2013–14	Korey Dropkin	Tom Howell	Mark Fenner	Alex Fenson			2014 USJCC (bronze)
2014–15	Korey Dropkin	Tom Howell	Mark Fenner	Andrew Stopera	Luc Violette		2015 USJCC (silver); 2015 USMCC (6th)
2014–15	Ethan Meyers	Quinn Evenson	Steven Szemple	William Pryor	Korey Dropkin	Linda Christensen	2015 WJCC (5th)
2015–16	Korey Dropkin	Tom Howell	Mark Fenner	Alex Fenson	Quinn Evenson	Wally Henry (WJCC)	2016 USMCC (4th); 2016 USJCC (gold); 2016 WJCC (silver)
2016–17	Heath McCormick	Chris Plys	Korey Dropkin	Tom Howell			2017 USMCC (6th)
2017–18	Heath McCormick	Chris Plys	Korey Dropkin	Tom Howell			2018 USMCC (silver)
2018–19	Korey Dropkin	Tom Howell	Mark Fenner	Alex Fenson			2019 USMCC (4th)
2018–19	John Shuster	Chris Plys	Matt Hamilton	John Landsteiner	Korey Dropkin	Derek Brown; Don Bartlett	2019 WMCC (5th)
2019–20	Korey Dropkin	Tom Howell	Mark Fenner	Alex Fenson	Joe Polo		2020 USMCC (5th)
2020–21	Korey Dropkin	Joe Polo	Mark Fenner	Tom Howell	Alex Fenson		2021 USMCC (gold)
2021–22	Korey Dropkin	Joe Polo	Mark Fenner	Tom Howell	Alex Fenson		2021 USOCT (silver); 2022 WMCC (4th)
2022–23	Korey Dropkin	Andrew Stopera	Mark Fenner	Tom Howell		Mark Lazar	2022 PCCC (bronze); 2023 USMCC (bronze)
2023–24	Korey Dropkin (Fourth)	Andrew Stopera (Skip)	Mark Fenner	Tom Howell		Mark Lazar	2023 PCCC (4th); 2024 USMCC (silver)
2024–25	Korey Dropkin	Tom Howell	Andrew Stopera	Mark Fenner	Chris Plys (WMCC)	Mark Lazar	2025 USMCC (gold); 2025 WMCC (11th)
2025–26	Korey Dropkin	Tom Howell	Andrew Stopera	Mark Fenner		Mark Lazar	

=== Mixed doubles ===
Season	Female	Male	Events
2011–12	Marina Verenich	Korey Dropkin	2012 WYOG (bronze)
2014–15	Sarah Anderson	Korey Dropkin	2015 USMDCC (gold); 2015 WMDCC (5th)
2017–18	Sarah Anderson	Korey Dropkin	2018 USMDCC (gold); 2018 WMDCC (13th)
2018–19	Sarah Anderson	Korey Dropkin	2019 USMDCC (QF)
2019–20	Sarah Anderson	Korey Dropkin	2020 USMDCC (bronze)
2020–21	Sarah Anderson	Korey Dropkin	
2021–22	Sarah Anderson	Korey Dropkin	2021 USMDOT (bronze); 2022 USMDCC (5th)
2022–23	Cory Thiesse	Korey Dropkin	2023 USMDCC (gold); 2023 WMDCC (gold)
2023–24	Cory Thiesse	Korey Dropkin	2024 USMDCC (silver)
2024–25	Cory Thiesse	Korey Dropkin	2025 USMDOT (gold); 2025 WMDCC (5th)
2025–26	Cory Thiesse	Korey Dropkin	2026 WOG (silver)

=== Mixed ===
Season	Skip	Third	Second	Lead	Coach	Events
2011–12	Korey Dropkin	Sarah Anderson	Thomas Howell	Taylor Anderson	Wally Henry	2012 WYOG (5th)

== Grand Slam record ==
Key
C	Champion
F	Lost in Final
SF	Lost in Semifinal
QF	Lost in Quarterfinals
R16	Lost in the round of 16
Q	Did not advance to playoffs
T2	Played in Tier 2 event
DNP	Did not participate in event
N/A	Not a Grand Slam event that season

Event	2016–17	2017–18	2018–19	2019–20	2020–21	2021–22	2022–23	2023–24	2024–25	2025–26	2026–27
Invitational	DNP	Q	T2	T2	N/A	N/A	T2	Q	Q	Q	DNP
Masters	DNP	DNP	DNP	DNP	N/A	DNP	Q	Q	QF	Q	DNP
National	DNP	DNP	DNP	DNP	DNP	DNP	SF	QF	DNP	DNP	
Open	Q	DNP	DNP	QF	N/A	N/A	QF	Q	DNP	DNP	DNP
Players'	DNP	DNP	DNP	N/A	DNP	DNP	Q	DNP	Q	DNP	DNP
Champions Cup	Q	DNP	DNP	N/A	DNP	Q	DNP	N/A	N/A	N/A	N/A
