= Mark Fenner =

American curler

- Curler
- Born: December 16, 1994 (age 31); Bemidji, Minnesota, U.S.

Team
- Curling club: Bemidji CC, Bemidji, MN
- Skip: John Shuster
- Third: Andrew Stopera
- Second: Mark Fenner
- Lead: Lance Wheeler

Curling career
- Member Association: United States
- World Championship: 2 (2022, 2025)
- Pan Continental Championship: 2 (2022, 2023)
Medal record
Curling
Representing United States
World Junior Championships
Silver medal – second place	2016 Copenhagen
Pan Continental Curling Championships
Bronze medal – third place	2022 Calgary
U.S. Men's Championship
Gold medal – first place	2021 Wausau
Gold medal – first place	2025 Duluth
Silver medal – second place	2024 East Rutherford
Silver medal – second place	2026 Charlotte
Bronze medal – third place	2023 Denver

Mark Fenner (born November 16, 1994) is an American curler originally from Bemidji, Minnesota. He currently plays second on Team John Shuster out of Duluth, Minnesota. He is a three-time United States Junior Champion and won the silver medal at the 2017 World Junior Championships. In men's play, Fenner also won the 2025 United States Men's Curling Championship.

== Curling career ==
In juniors, Fenner played second for skip Korey Dropkin, medalling four years in a row at the United States Junior Curling Championships. This included two gold medals in 2013 and 2016. The team also consisted of Tom Howell at third and Alex Fenson at lead, except for the 2014–15 season when Andrew Stopera played lead. At the 2013 World Junior Curling Championships in Sochi, Russia, they finished in seventh place with a record of 4–5. At their second trip to the World Juniors in 2016, they found more success, finishing the round-robin in first place with a record of 8–1. In the 1 vs 2 page playoff game they lost to Bruce Mouat's Team Scotland, but they defeated Switzerland's Yannick Schwaller in the semifinal to face Scotland again in the championship game. Fenner and Team United States lost to Mouat again in the final, to finish with the silver medal.

Upon moving from juniors to men's, Fenner and Alex Fenson played as the front end for Pete Fenson for two seasons. Pete Fenson, Alex's father, is also an Olympian and seven-time national champion. During these two seasons, from 2016 to 2018, Dropkin and Howell played as the front end for Heath McCormick, but for the 2018–19 season Dropkin, Howell, Fenner, and Fenson reunited to compete together again. The next season Team Dropkin brought on Joe Polo, a highly experienced curler who was the alternate on the gold medal-winning team at the 2018 Winter Olympics, as a fifth teammate and experimented with various lineups throughout the season. The five-person team found success at the 2021 US Men's Championship, finishing the round-robin in first place with a 7–2 record. In the playoffs, Team Dropkin defeated Jed Brundidge's team in the 1 vs 2 page playoff game and then again in the final to secure their first Men's National Championship. Due to the COVID-19 pandemic, the 2021 Championship was conducted after the 2021 World Men's Championship so Team Dropkin will not represent the United States at World's, but they did secure a spot at the Olympic Trials in the fall of 2021.

The Dropkin team parted ways with Polo during the 2022–23 season, and picked up junior teammate Stopera. The team had good success, winning a bronze medal at the 2022 Pan Continental Curling Championships, and finishing fourth in 2023. The rink won their first men's national title together at the 2025 United States Men's Curling Championship, representing USA at the 2025 World Men's Curling Championship. At the 2025 Worlds, the team went 4-8 after the round robin, finishing a disappointing 11th place.

== Personal life ==
Fenner currently works as a bartender and lives in Richfield, Minnesota.

== Teams ==
=== Men's ===
Season	Skip	Third	Second	Lead	Alternate	Coach	Events
2012–13	Korey Dropkin	Tom Howell	Mark Fenner	Alex Fenson	Connor Hoge	Keith Dropkin	2013 USJCC (gold); 2013 WJCC (7th)
2013–14	Korey Dropkin	Tom Howell	Mark Fenner	Alex Fenson			2014 USJCC (bronze)
2014–15	Korey Dropkin	Tom Howell	Mark Fenner	Andrew Stopera	Luc Violette		2015 USJCC (silver); 2015 USMCC (6th)
2015–16	Korey Dropkin	Tom Howell	Mark Fenner	Alex Fenson	Quinn Evenson	Wally Henry (WJCC)	2016 USMCC (4th); 2016 USJCC (gold); 2016 WJCC (silver)
2016–17	Pete Fenson	Jared Zezel	Mark Fenner	Alex Fenson			2017 USMCC (5th)
2017–18	Pete Fenson	Shawn Rojeski	Mark Fenner	Alex Fenson			2018 USMCC (T6th)
2018–19	Korey Dropkin (fourth)	Tom Howell	Mark Fenner (skip)	Alex Fenson			2019 USMCC (4th)
2019–20	Korey Dropkin	Tom Howell	Mark Fenner	Alex Fenson	Joe Polo		2020 USMCC (5th)
2020–21	Korey Dropkin	Joe Polo	Mark Fenner	Tom Howell	Alex Fenson		2021 USMCC (gold)
2021–22	Korey Dropkin	Joe Polo	Mark Fenner	Tom Howell	Alex Fenson	Tim Solin	2021 USOCT (silver); 2022 WCC (4th)
2022–23	Korey Dropkin	Andrew Stopera	Mark Fenner	Tom Howell		Mark Lazar	2022 PCCC (bronze); 2023 USMCC (bronze)
2023–24	Korey Dropkin (Fourth)	Andrew Stopera (Skip)	Mark Fenner	Tom Howell		Mark Lazar	2023 PCCC (4th); 2024 USMCC (silver)
2024–25	Korey Dropkin	Tom Howell	Andrew Stopera	Mark Fenner	Chris Plys (WMCC)	Mark Lazar	2025 USMCC (gold); 2025 WMCC (11th)
2025	Korey Dropkin	Tom Howell	Andrew Stopera	Mark Fenner		Mark Lazar	
2025–26	Andrew Stopera	Tom Howell	Mark Fenner	Lance Wheeler		Mark Lazar	2026 USMCC (silver)
2026–27	John Shuster	Andrew Stopera	Mark Fenner	Lance Wheeler		Mark Lazar	

=== Mixed doubles ===
Season	Male	Female	Events
2014–15	Mark Fenner	Tina Persinger	2015 USMDCC (SF)
