= 2026 United States Men's Curling Championship =

Sporting Event

- Host city: Charlotte, North Carolina
- Arena: Bojangles Coliseum
- Dates: February 23 – March 1
- Winner: (Minnesota) Team Shuster
- Curling club: Duluth CC, Duluth
- Skip: John Shuster
- Third: Chris Plys
- Second: Colin Hufman
- Lead: Matt Hamilton
- Finalist: (Minnesota) Andrew Stopera

The 2026 United States Men's Curling Championship was held from February 23 to March 1 at the Bojangles Coliseum in Charlotte, North Carolina. The event was held in conjunction with the 2026 United States Women's Curling Championship. The winning John Shuster rink will also represent the United States as the host team during the 2026 World Men's Curling Championship at the Weber County Ice Sheet in Ogden City, Utah.

== Qualification process ==
The following teams qualified to participate in the 2026 national championship:

Qualification	Berths	Qualifying Team(s)
2025 United States Olympic Curling Trials	2*	(Minnesota) John Shuster (Minnesota) Andrew Stopera
Qualifying Event (St. Paul Cash Spiel)	1	(Pennsylvania) Scott Dunnam
Last Chance Qualifier	2	(Minnesota) Wesley Wendling (Colorado) Elliot Mansell
WCTRS Highest Ranked Team (December 26, 2025)	3	(Minnesota) Kevin Tuma (Wisconsin) Carson McMullin (North Dakota) Timothy Hodek
TOTAL	8	

4 Berths were initially awarded for qualifying for the 2025 United States Olympic Curling Trials. Team Daniel Casper declined their berth after qualifying to the 2026 Winter Olympics at the 2025 Olympic Qualification Event. Team Caden Hebert declined their berth to play in the 2026 World Junior Curling Championship. The 2 declined berths plus an additional remaining berth were used to award berths the highest-ranked teams not already qualified determined based on team positions as of December 26th on the World Curling Team Ranking System (WCTRS)

== Teams ==
The teams are listed as follows:

Skip	Third	Second	Lead	Alternate	Locale
Scott Dunnam	Cody Clouser	Alex Leichter	Andrew Dunnam	Shaheen Bassiri	Philadelphia, Pennsylvania
Tim Hodek	Evan Workin	Josh Moore	Nathan Parry		Fargo, North Dakota
Elliot Mansell	Daniel Dudt	Sean Franey	Simon Jarrett		Denver, Colorado
Carson McMullin	Caiden Rose	Will Podhrasky	Ethan Macomber		Eau Claire, Wisconsin
Ethan Sampson	Wesley Wendling	Jacob Zeman	Marius Kleinas		Chaska, Minnesota
John Shuster	Chris Plys	Colin Hufman	Matt Hamilton		Duluth, Minnesota
Andrew Stopera	Thomas Howell	Mark Fenner	Lance Wheeler		Duluth, Minnesota
Samuel Strouse (Fourth)	Kevin Tuma (Skip)	Coleman Thurston	Connor Kauffman	Aaron Carlson	Chaska, Minnesota

== Round robin standings ==
Final Round Robin Standings

Key
Teams to Playoffs
Teams to Tiebreaker

Team	W	L	W–L	PF	PA	EW	EL	BE	SE
(Minnesota) John Shuster	7	0	–	57	26	29	20	2	10
(Minnesota) Andrew Stopera	6	1	–	61	34	30	21	3	11
(Minnesota) Kevin Tuma	5	2	–	52	37	27	28	2	5
(Wisconsin) Carson McMullin	3	4	1–0	43	55	30	30	2	13
(Pennsylvania) Scott Dunnam	3	4	0–1	46	46	29	31	1	8
(Minnesota) Wesley Wendling	2	5	1–0	50	53	32	29	2	10
(North Dakota) Timothy Hodek	2	5	0–1	32	60	21	33	5	4
(Colorado) Elliot Mansell	0	7	–	32	62	24	30	4	4

== Round robin results ==
All draw times are listed in Eastern Time (UTC−05:00).

=== Draw 1 ===
Monday, February 23, 7:00 pm

Sheet A	1	2	3	4	5	6	7	8	9	10	Final
(Minnesota) Wesley Wendling 🔨	0	1	0	2	2	0	1	0	2	0	8
(Minnesota) John Shuster	0	0	1	0	0	3	0	2	0	3	9

Sheet B	1	2	3	4	5	6	7	8	9	10	Final
(Pennsylvania) Scott Dunnam	0	0	1	1	1	2	3	X	X	X	8
(North Dakota) Timothy Hodek 🔨	0	0	0	0	0	0	0	X	X	X	0

Sheet C	1	2	3	4	5	6	7	8	9	10	Final
(Minnesota) Kevin Tuma 🔨	1	1	0	0	0	3	0	1	0	1	7
(Wisconsin) Carson McMullin	0	0	2	0	1	0	2	0	0	0	5

Sheet D	1	2	3	4	5	6	7	8	9	10	Final
(Colorado) Elliot Mansell	0	0	1	0	0	1	X	X	X	X	2
(Minnesota) Andrew Stopera 🔨	2	3	0	3	2	0	X	X	X	X	10

=== Draw 2 ===
Tuesday, February 24, 2:00 pm

Sheet A	1	2	3	4	5	6	7	8	9	10	Final
(North Dakota) Timothy Hodek 🔨	1	0	1	0	0	1	0	X	X	X	3
(Minnesota) Kevin Tuma	0	2	0	4	3	0	2	X	X	X	11

Sheet B	1	2	3	4	5	6	7	8	9	10	Final
(Minnesota) Wesley Wendling 🔨	0	0	1	0	3	0	1	0	0	X	5
(Minnesota) Andrew Stopera	0	1	0	3	0	2	0	1	2	X	9

Sheet C	1	2	3	4	5	6	7	8	9	10	Final
(Minnesota) John Shuster	2	3	0	0	2	0	X	X	X	X	7
(Colorado) Elliot Mansell 🔨	0	0	0	1	0	1	X	X	X	X	2

Sheet D	1	2	3	4	5	6	7	8	9	10	Final
(Pennsylvania) Scott Dunnam	0	0	2	1	0	0	0	0	3	0	6
(Wisconsin) Carson McMullin 🔨	1	2	0	0	1	1	1	1	0	1	8

=== Draw 3 ===
Wednesday, February 25, 8:00 am

Sheet A	1	2	3	4	5	6	7	8	9	10	Final
(Wisconsin) Carson McMullin	3	1	0	0	2	0	1	0	0	2	9
(Minnesota) Wesley Wendling 🔨	0	0	1	1	0	3	0	1	2	0	8

Sheet B	1	2	3	4	5	6	7	8	9	10	11	Final
(Colorado) Elliot Mansell 🔨	1	0	3	0	1	0	1	0	0	1	0	7
(Pennsylvania) Scott Dunnam	0	1	0	2	0	3	0	1	0	0	1	8

Sheet C	1	2	3	4	5	6	7	8	9	10	Final
(Minnesota) Andrew Stopera	4	0	1	0	2	0	4	X	X	X	11
(North Dakota) Timothy Hodek 🔨	0	1	0	1	0	1	0	X	X	X	3

Sheet D	1	2	3	4	5	6	7	8	9	10	Final
(Minnesota) Kevin Tuma 🔨	1	0	0	1	0	1	0	0	0	X	3
(Minnesota) John Shuster	0	1	2	0	2	0	1	1	0	X	7

=== Draw 4 ===
Wednesday, February 25, 4:00 pm

Sheet A	1	2	3	4	5	6	7	8	9	10	Final
(Pennsylvania) Scott Dunnam 🔨	1	0	0	3	0	0	0	1	0	0	5
(Minnesota) Andrew Stopera	0	2	1	0	0	1	1	0	2	1	8

Sheet B	1	2	3	4	5	6	7	8	9	10	Final
(Minnesota) John Shuster 🔨	0	1	3	2	2	1	X	X	X	X	9
(Wisconsin) Carson McMullin	1	0	0	0	0	0	X	X	X	X	1

Sheet C	1	2	3	4	5	6	7	8	9	10	Final
(Minnesota) Wesley Wendling	0	1	0	1	0	2	0	1	X	X	5
(Minnesota) Kevin Tuma 🔨	3	0	1	0	3	0	2	0	X	X	9

Sheet D	1	2	3	4	5	6	7	8	9	10	Final
(North Dakota) Timothy Hodek	0	4	0	0	3	0	0	0	2	2	11
(Colorado) Elliot Mansell 🔨	2	0	1	1	0	2	0	1	0	0	7

=== Draw 5 ===
Thursday, February 26, 7:00 pm

Sheet A	1	2	3	4	5	6	7	8	9	10	Final
(Minnesota) Kevin Tuma	0	1	2	0	1	2	0	0	2	X	8
(Pennsylvania) Scott Dunnam 🔨	1	0	0	1	0	0	1	2	0	X	5

Sheet B	1	2	3	4	5	6	7	8	9	10	Final
(Minnesota) Andrew Stopera	0	0	0	1	0	1	0	0	X	X	2
(Minnesota) John Shuster 🔨	0	1	0	0	3	0	3	1	X	X	8

Sheet C	1	2	3	4	5	6	7	8	9	10	Final
(Colorado) Elliot Mansell 🔨	0	0	0	1	1	0	0	3	0	X	5
(Minnesota) Wesley Wendling	0	1	1	0	0	3	2	0	2	X	9

Sheet D	1	2	3	4	5	6	7	8	9	10	Final
(Wisconsin) Carson McMullin	1	0	0	2	0	1	0	1	0	1	6
(North Dakota) Timothy Hodek 🔨	0	1	1	0	2	0	1	0	2	0	7

=== Draw 6 ===
Friday, February 27, 4:00 pm

Sheet A	1	2	3	4	5	6	7	8	9	10	Final
(Colorado) Elliot Mansell	0	2	0	1	0	0	0	0	2	0	5
(Wisconsin) Carson McMullin 🔨	0	0	2	0	1	1	1	1	0	3	9

Sheet B	1	2	3	4	5	6	7	8	9	10	Final
(North Dakota) Timothy Hodek 🔨	0	0	0	2	1	0	0	0	1	0	4
(Minnesota) Wesley Wendling	0	1	2	0	0	1	1	2	0	1	8

Sheet C	1	2	3	4	5	6	7	8	9	10	Final
(Pennsylvania) Scott Dunnam	0	1	0	2	0	2	0	1	0	X	6
(Minnesota) John Shuster 🔨	2	0	2	0	3	0	1	0	0	X	8

Sheet D	1	2	3	4	5	6	7	8	9	10	Final
(Minnesota) Andrew Stopera 🔨	2	1	0	1	0	3	0	0	1	X	8
(Minnesota) Kevin Tuma	0	0	2	0	3	0	1	0	0	X	6

=== Draw 7 ===
Saturday, February 28, 8:00 am

Sheet A	1	2	3	4	5	6	7	8	9	10	Final
(Minnesota) John Shuster 🔨	2	0	4	0	1	0	0	2	X	X	9
(North Dakota) Timothy Hodek	0	1	0	0	0	2	1	0	X	X	4

Sheet B	1	2	3	4	5	6	7	8	9	10	Final
(Minnesota) Kevin Tuma	0	0	2	0	3	0	3	0	X	X	8
(Colorado) Elliot Mansell 🔨	0	1	0	1	0	1	0	1	X	X	4

Sheet C	1	2	3	4	5	6	7	8	9	10	Final
(Wisconsin) Carson McMullin 🔨	1	2	0	0	0	2	0	X	X	X	5
(Minnesota) Andrew Stopera	0	0	2	1	7	0	3	X	X	X	13

Sheet D	1	2	3	4	5	6	7	8	9	10	Final
(Minnesota) Wesley Wendling 🔨	2	0	1	0	0	2	0	2	0	0	7
(Pennsylvania) Scott Dunnam	0	1	0	0	2	0	1	0	3	1	8

== Tiebreaker ==
Saturday, February 28, 2:00 pm

Sheet B	1	2	3	4	5	6	7	8	9	10	Final
(Wisconsin) Carson McMullin	0	1	0	1	2	0	2	1	0	0	7
(Pennsylvania) Scott Dunnam 🔨	2	0	1	0	0	3	0	0	2	2	10

== Playoffs ==
Page playoff system
1	(Minnesota) John Shuster	6
2	(Minnesota) Andrew Stopera	7
3	(Minnesota) Kevin Tuma	8
4	(Pennsylvania) Scott Dunnam	7

Semifinal
1	(Minnesota) John Shuster	10
3	(Minnesota) Kevin Tuma	5

Final
2	(Minnesota) Andrew Stopera	6
1	(Minnesota) John Shuster	7

=== 1 vs. 2 ===
Saturday, February 28, 7:00 pm

Sheet B	1	2	3	4	5	6	7	8	9	10	Final
(Minnesota) John Shuster 🔨	0	0	2	1	0	2	0	0	0	1	6
(Minnesota) Andrew Stopera	2	1	0	0	2	0	0	1	1	0	7

=== 3 vs. 4 ===
Saturday, February 28, 7:00 pm

Sheet A	1	2	3	4	5	6	7	8	9	10	Final
(Minnesota) Kevin Tuma 🔨	3	0	0	1	0	3	0	1	0	X	8
(Pennsylvania) Scott Dunnam	0	3	1	0	0	0	1	0	2	X	7

=== Semifinal ===
Sunday, March 1, 10:00 am

Sheet C	1	2	3	4	5	6	7	8	9	10	Final
(Minnesota) John Shuster 🔨	1	0	3	0	0	6	0	0	X	X	10
(Minnesota) Kevin Tuma	0	1	0	0	1	0	2	1	X	X	5

=== Final ===
Sunday, March 1, 4:00 pm

Sheet B	1	2	3	4	5	6	7	8	9	10	11	Final
(Minnesota) Andrew Stopera 🔨	1	0	1	0	0	2	0	1	0	1	0	6
(Minnesota) John Shuster	0	1	0	1	0	0	2	0	2	0	1	7

2026 United States Men's Curling Championship

John Shuster
11th United States Championship title
