= John Shuster =

American curler (born 1982)

- Curler
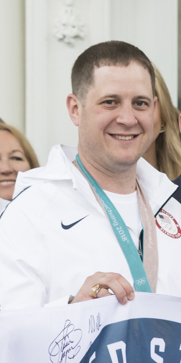
- Shuster in 2018
- Born: November 3, 1982 (age 44); Chisholm, Minnesota, U.S.
- Height: 6 ft 0 in (183 cm)

Team
- Curling club: Duluth CC, Duluth, MN
- Skip: John Shuster
- Third: Andrew Stopera
- Second: Mark Fenner
- Lead: Lance Wheeler
- Mixed doubles partner: Nia Berg

Curling career
- Member Association: United States
- World Championship: 12 (2003, 2005, 2006, 2009, 2015, 2016, 2017, 2019, 2021, 2023, 2024, 2026)
- World Mixed Doubles Championship: 1 (2019)
- Pan Continental Championship: 2 (2024, 2025)
- Olympic: 5 (2006, 2010, 2014, 2018, 2022)
Medal record
Representing United States
Men's curling
Winter Olympics
Gold medal – first place	2018 Pyeongchang	Team
Bronze medal – third place	2006 Turin	Team
World Curling Championships
Bronze medal – third place	2016 Basel
Pan Continental Championships
Silver medal – second place	2025 Virginia
Bronze medal – third place	2024 Lacombe
Winter Universiade
Gold medal – first place	2007 Turin
Representing Minnesota
US Olympic Trials
Gold medal – first place	2005 Madison
Gold medal – first place	2009 Broomfield
Gold medal – first place	2013 Fargo
Gold medal – first place	2017 Omaha
Gold medal – first place	2021 Omaha
Silver medal – second place	2025 Sioux Falls
US Men's Championship
Gold medal – first place	2003 Utica
Gold medal – first place	2005 Madison
Gold medal – first place	2006 Bemidji
Gold medal – first place	2015 Kalamazoo
Gold medal – first place	2017 Everett
Gold medal – first place	2019 Kalamazoo
Gold medal – first place	2020 Cheney
Gold medal – first place	2023 Denver
Gold medal – first place	2024 East Rutherford
Gold medal – first place	2026 Charlotte
Silver medal – second place	2016 Jacksonville
Bronze medal – third place	2012 Philadelphia
Bronze medal – third place	2013 Green Bay
Bronze medal – third place	2025 Duluth
Mixed doubles curling
World Mixed Doubles Curling Championship
Bronze medal – third place	2019 Stavanger
US Olympic Trials
Silver medal – second place	2017 Blaine
US Mixed Doubles Championship
Gold medal – first place	2019 Seattle
Silver medal – second place	2020 Bemidji
Bronze medal – third place	2024 Traverse City

John Shuster (/ˈʃuːstər/ SHOO-stər; born November 3, 1982) is an American curler who lives in Superior, Wisconsin. He led Team USA to gold at the 2018 Winter Olympics, the first American team to ever win gold in curling. He also won a bronze medal at the 2006 Winter Olympics in Turin. He has played in five straight Winter Olympics (2006, 2010, 2014, 2018, 2022) and twelve World Curling Championships (2003, 2005, 2006, 2009, 2015, 2016, 2017, 2019, 2021, 2023, 2024, 2026).

== Curling career ==
=== Pete Fenson rink and 2006 Winter Olympics ===
Shuster began his international career playing lead for Pete Fenson's team. He played in his first world competition at the 2003 Ford World Men's Curling Championship, where the U.S. finished eighth. The team returned to Worlds at the 2005 Ford World Men's Curling Championship, where they lost in a tiebreaker game after posting an 8–3 round-robin record. The Fenson team won the 2005 United States Olympic Curling Trials and went on to play at the 2006 Winter Olympics, where they won a bronze medal (the first-ever Olympic medal in curling for the U.S.). After the season, Shuster left to form his own team.

=== 2007–2014 ===
Shuster played in his first Worlds as a skip at the 2009 Ford World Men's Curling Championship in Moncton, New Brunswick, finishing with a 7–4 record and losing in a tiebreaker match against Norway to finish fifth. His team won the 2009 United States Olympic Curling Trials and represented the United States at the 2010 Olympic Games in Vancouver. However, after Shuster missed several crucial last-rock shots in three of the United States' first four matches, U.S. coaches took the unusual step of replacing him with alternate Chris Plys.

After skipping the 2010 Olympic team to a last-place finish, Shuster joined Craig Brown as his third. For the 2010–11 season, Shuster formed his own team again, this time with Zach Jacobson, Jared Zezel, and John Landsteiner. He then replaced Jacobson with longtime teammate Jeff Isaacson at third in the 2012–13 season. Shuster won his second World Curling Tour event as skip at the 2012 St. Paul Cash Spiel, defeating Todd Birr in the final.

After back-to-back bronze medal finishes at the 2012 and 2013 United States Men's Curling Championships, Shuster and his team were selected to participate at the 2013 United States Olympic Curling Trials by the United States Curling Association's High Performance Program committee. Shuster and his team finished first in the round-robin, and played Pete Fenson in the three-game final round, winning after the third game. Thus, Shuster's team represented the United States at the qualifying event for the Olympics and succeeded in securing the final spot at the Olympics for the United States. He again represented the United States at the Winter Olympics in Sochi, marking his third consecutive appearance at the Olympics. However, Shuster's team again got off to a slow start and was unable to recover, finishing in ninth place with a 2–7 win–loss record.

=== U.S. rejection and 2018 Winter Olympics ===
Following the U.S. team's Olympic struggles, the United States Curling Association held an athlete combine to determine which curlers to include in their High Performance Program (HPP) aimed at having better success at the next Olympics. Shuster and teammate Landsteiner were two of the athletes dropped from the HPP. In response, Shuster created a new team nicknamed "The Rejects" with Landsteiner at lead, fellow combine reject Matt Hamilton at second, and Tyler George at third, who had not attended the combine due to his work. They maintained this line-up for four seasons and found great success. They defeated both HPP teams to win the gold medal at the National Championships in 2015. Representing the United States at the 2015 World Championship in Halifax, Nova Scotia, Team Shuster missed out on the playoffs when they lost a tiebreaker to Finland's Aku Kauste. As a result of its success, Team Shuster was added to the High Performance Program for 2016.

Shuster came up just short of defending his national title in 2016, losing to Brady Clark in the final. Despite finishing in second, Team Shuster earned enough points throughout the season to secure their return trip to the World Championship. In Basel, Switzerland, they defeated Japan's Yusuke Morozumi in the bronze medal match, earning the first World Men's medal for the United States since 2007. For the 2016–17 season they added Joe Polo, a former teammate of Shuster and George, as alternate and won the 2017 National Championship. At the 2017 World Championship, their third Worlds in a row, they lost in the bronze medal game against Team Switzerland, skipped by Peter de Cruz.

At the 2017 United States Olympic Curling Trials, Shuster and his team beat Heath McCormick's team in a best-of-three final series, setting up Shuster's fourth straight Olympics appearance. In the 2018 Winter Olympics in PyeongChang, the U.S. team lost four of its first six matches and needed to win all of its three remaining matches to qualify for the playoffs, but all of its remaining opponents (Canada, Switzerland, and Great Britain) were then among the top four teams. Nevertheless, the U.S. team won all three matches to finish the round-robin in third place with a record of 5–4. In the semifinals, they defeated Canada's Kevin Koe, a two-time world champion, to reach the gold-medal match versus Niklas Edin's team representing Sweden. The gold-medal game was close through seven ends, with the score tied 5–5, but the United States scored five in the eighth end to set up a 10–7 victory. This was the first Olympic gold medal in curling for the United States.

=== Post-Olympics ===
Tyler George left the team after the 2017–18 season and was replaced by Chris Plys. The team represented the United States at the second leg of the 2018–19 Curling World Cup in Omaha, Nebraska, where they beat Niklas Edin in the final in a re-match of the Olympic gold medal match. The team won the 2019 United States Men's Curling Championship and represented the United States at the 2019 World Men's Curling Championship, where they were knocked out in the quarterfinals. Shuster's team was also chosen to represent the United States for the final leg of the Curling World Cup, called the Grand Final, in Beijing. They finished in 6th place.

Shuster defended his United States title at the 2020 United States Men's Championship, defeating Rich Ruohonen in the final to finish the tournament undefeated. The national title would have earned Team Shuster a spot at the final Grand Slam of the season, the Champions Cup, as well as the chance to represent the United States at the 2020 World Men's Curling Championship, but both events were cancelled due to the COVID-19 pandemic.

Shuster was the skip for the United States team at the 2021 World Men's Curling Championship, which was played in a fan-less bubble in Calgary due to the ongoing COVID-19 pandemic. There, he led his U.S. rink to a 10–3 round robin record, in third place. They played Switzerland in the playoffs, in a game which was delayed a day due to some curlers testing positive for the virus. In the game, Switzerland, skipped by Peter de Cruz, beat the Americans to advance to the semifinals.

=== Mixed doubles ===
Shuster competes in mixed doubles curling with Cory Christensen. The pair finished in second place at the 2017 United States Mixed Doubles Curling Olympic Trials and earned a national championship in 2019. At the 2019 World Championship Shuster and Christensen finished the round robin tied for first in their group with a record of 6–1. They later lost to Canada in the semifinals but defeated the Australian team of Dean Hewitt and Tahli Gill for the bronze medal.

=== 2022 Winter Olympics ===
Shuster competed for Team USA in the men's curling tournament at the 2022 Winter Olympics in Beijing. He served as one of the American flag bearers at the opening ceremony.

=== 2026 Olympic Trials ===
Team Shuster was defeated in the finals of the United States Olympic curling trials by Team Casper. This was the first loss for a team that Shuster was a part of at the Olympic Trials in 20 years. The 2026 Olympic Games will be the first winter Olympics without Shuster since 2002.

== Personal life ==
Shuster is married to Sara Shuster and has two children. He was employed as a "Team USA Sales Associate" for Dick's Sporting Goods, and now works as a public speaker. He lives in Superior, Wisconsin.

In November 2022, Shuster became co-owner of Duluth FC in the National Premier Soccer League.

== Grand Slam record ==
Key
C	Champion
F	Lost in Final
SF	Lost in Semifinal
QF	Lost in Quarterfinals
R16	Lost in the round of 16
Q	Did not advance to playoffs
T2	Played in Tier 2 event
DNP	Did not participate in event
N/A	Not a Grand Slam event that season

Event	2003–04	2004–05	2005–06	2009–10	2014–15	2015–16	2016–17	2017–18	2018–19	2019–20	2020–21	2021–22	2022–23	2023–24	2024–25	2025–26	2026–27
Invitational	N/A	N/A	N/A	N/A	N/A	SF	Q	QF	QF	QF	N/A	N/A	T2	Q	Q	DNP	DNP
Masters	Q	DNP	DNP	Q	DNP	DNP	Q	Q	QF	Q	N/A	DNP	DNP	DNP	DNP	T2	DNP
National	DNP	DNP	Q	Q	Q	Q	Q	DNP	DNP	DNP	N/A	DNP	DNP	Q	QF	DNQ	Q
Open	DNP	DNP	Q	Q	DNP	Q	QF	Q	DNP	DNP	N/A	N/A	DNP	DNP	Q	SF	DNP
Players'	DNP	QF	QF	DNP	DNP	Q	DNP	Q	DNP	N/A	DNP	DNP	DNP	DNP	DNP	QF	
Champions Cup	N/A	N/A	N/A	N/A	N/A	Q	Q	DNP	DNP	N/A	DNP	DNP	Q	N/A	N/A	N/A	N/A
Elite 10	N/A	N/A	N/A	N/A	DNP	DNP	DNP	Q	DNP	N/A	N/A	N/A	N/A	N/A	N/A	N/A	N/A

== Teams ==
=== Men's ===
Season	Skip	Third	Second	Lead	Events
2001–02	John Shuster	Jeremiah Dotlich	Jeff Thune	Jesse Gates	2002 USJCC (silver)
2002–03	Pete Fenson	Eric Fenson	Shawn Rojeski	John Shuster	2003 USMCC (gold); 2003 WMCC (8th)
2003–04	Pete Fenson	Eric Fenson	Shawn Rojeski	John Shuster	2004 USMCC (silver)
2003–04	John Shuster	Jason Smith	Kevin Johnson	Shane McKinlay	2004 USJCC (gold)
2004–05	Pete Fenson	Shawn Rojeski	Joe Polo	John Shuster	2005 USMCC/USOCT (gold); 2005 WMCC (6th)
2005–06	Pete Fenson	Shawn Rojeski	Joe Polo	John Shuster	2006 USMCC (gold); 2006 OG (bronze); 2006 WMCC (4th)
2006–07	Pete Fenson	Shawn Rojeski	Joe Polo	John Shuster	
2006–07	John Shuster	Jeff Isaacson	Chris Plys	Shane McKinlay	2007 WUG (gold)
2007–08	John Shuster	Jeff Isaacson	Chris Plys	Shane McKinlay	2008 USMCC (6th)
2008–09	John Shuster	Jason Smith	Jeff Isaacson	John Benton	2009 USMCC/USOCT (gold); 2009 WMCC (5th)
2009–10	John Shuster	Jason Smith	Jeff Isaacson	John Benton	2010 OG (10th)
2010–11	Craig Brown	John Shuster	Greg Johnson	Derrick Casper	2011 USMCC (6th)
2011–12	John Shuster	Zach Jacobson	Jared Zezel	John Landsteiner	2012 USMCC (bronze)
2012–13	John Shuster	Jeff Isaacson	Jared Zezel	John Landsteiner	2013 USMCC (bronze)
2013–14	John Shuster	Jeff Isaacson	Jared Zezel	John Landsteiner	2013 USOCT (gold); 2014 USMCC (5th); 2014 OG (9th)
2014–15	John Shuster	Tyler George	Matt Hamilton	John Landsteiner	2015 USMCC (gold); 2015 WMCC (5th)
2015–16	John Shuster	Tyler George	Matt Hamilton	John Landsteiner	2016 USMCC (silver); 2016 WMCC (bronze)
2016–17	John Shuster	Tyler George	Matt Hamilton	John Landsteiner	2017 USMCC (gold); 2017 WMCC (4th)
2017–18	John Shuster	Tyler George	Matt Hamilton	John Landsteiner	2017 USOCT (gold); 2018 OG (gold)
2018–19	John Shuster	Chris Plys	Matt Hamilton	John Landsteiner	CWC/2 (gold); 2019 USMCC (gold); 2019 WMCC (5th); CWC/GF (6th)
2019–20	John Shuster	Chris Plys	Matt Hamilton	John Landsteiner	2020 USMCC (gold)
2020–21	John Shuster	Chris Plys	Matt Hamilton	John Landsteiner	2021 WMCC (5th)
2021–22	John Shuster	Chris Plys	Matt Hamilton	John Landsteiner	2021 USOCT (gold); 2022 OG (4th)
2022–23	John Shuster	Chris Plys	Matt Hamilton	John Landsteiner	2023 USMCC (gold); 2023 WMCC (8th)
2023–24	John Shuster	Chris Plys	Colin Hufman	Matt Hamilton; John Landsteiner	2024 USMCC (gold); 2024 WMCC (6th)
2024–25	John Shuster	Chris Plys	Colin Hufman	Matt Hamilton; John Landsteiner	2024 PCCC (bronze); 2025 USMCC (bronze)
2025–26	John Shuster	Chris Plys	Colin Hufman	Matt Hamilton	2025 PCCC (silver); 2026 USMCC (gold); 2026 WMCC (4th)
2026–27	John Shuster	Andrew Stopera	Mark Fenner	Lance Wheeler	

=== Mixed doubles ===
Season	Female	Male	Events
2015–16	Cory Christensen	John Shuster	
2016–17	Cory Christensen	John Shuster	2017 USMDOT (silver); 2017 USMDCC (TB)
2018–19	Cory Christensen	John Shuster	2019 USMDCC (gold); 2019 WMDCC (bronze)
2019–20	Cory Christensen	John Shuster	2020 USMDCC (silver)
2020–21	Cory Christensen	John Shuster	
2021–22	Cory Christensen	John Shuster	2021 USMDOT (6th)
2022–23	Aileen Geving	John Shuster	2023 USMDCC (5th)
2023–24	Aileen Geving	John Shuster	2024 USMDCC (bronze)
2024–25	Aileen Geving	John Shuster	2025 USMDOT (8th)
2026–27	Nia Berg	John Shuster	

== Legacy ==
In 2025, a film titled "Sticks and Stones" went into production focused on John Shuster and his journey to Olympic gold. The film is shot on location in Winnipeg, Manitoba.
