= 2018 United States Mixed Doubles Curling Championship =

- Host city: Eau Claire, Wisconsin
- Arena: Eau Claire Curling Club
- Dates: January 17-21, 2018
- Winner: Sarah Anderson and Korey Dropkin

The 2018 United States Mixed Doubles Curling Championship was held from January 17-21 at the Eau Claire Curling Club in Eau Claire, Wisconsin. Sarah Anderson and Korey Dropkin won the tournament, earning the right to represent the United States at the 2018 World Mixed Doubles Curling Championship in Östersund, Sweden.

== Teams ==
The following 22 teams competed in the event:

State(s)	Female	Male
Maine Massachusetts	Libby Brundage	Alex Leichter
Wisconsin Washington	Jenna Burchesky	Ben Richardson
New York	Audrey Foote	Blake Hagberg
North Dakota	Larissa Unruh	Samuel Unruh
Minnesota	Lexi Lanigan	Quinn Evenson
California Arizona	Stephanie Larson	Fred Maxie
Minnesota	Maureen Stolt	Peter Stolt
Minnesota Wisconsin	Kirstin MeKeown	Gabriel Nickel
Minnesota	Christine McMakin	Riley Fenson
Colorado	Clare Moores	Lance Wheeler
Wisconsin	Emmalee Nichols	Greg Johnson
Minnesota	Kelsey Ostrowski	Gary Mazzotta
Wisconsin	Toni Paisley	Seth King
North Dakota Colorado	Ann Podoll	Nathan Parry
Minnesota	Regan Birr	Todd Birr
Minnesota	Kim Rhyme	Jason Smith
Massachusetts Wisconsin	Rebecca Rodgers	Charlie Thompson
Pennsylvania Texas	Harley Rohrbacher	Guy Davis
Minnesota	Sarah Anderson	Korey Dropkin
Minnesota Washington	Jessica Schultz	Derrick McLean
Minnesota Maryland	Taylor Anderson	Hunter Clawson
Ohio	Logan Tingley	Ryan O'Neil

== Round robin ==
=== Standings ===
Key
Teams to playoffs
Teams to Tiebreaker

Pool A	W	L
Anderson / Dropkin	4	1
Foote / Hagberg	4	1
Burchesky / Richardson	3	2
Larson / Maxie	3	2
Ostrowski / Mazzotta	1	4
Unruh / Unruh	0	5

Pool B	W	L
Schultz / McLean	5	0
Lanigan / Evenson	4	1
Podoll / Parry	2	3
Rodgers / Thompson	2	3
Birr / Birr	1	4
Paisley / King	1	4

Pool C	W	L
Stolt / Stolt	4	0
Moores / Wheeler	2	2
Tingley / O'Neil	2	2
Brundage / Leichter	1	3
Nichols / Johnson	1	3

Pool D	W	L
McMakin / Fenson	4	0
Anderson / Clawson	2	2
Rhyme / Smith	2	2
Rohrbacher / Davis	2	2
McKeown / Nickel	0	4

=== Game results ===
==== Tiebreaker (Pool C) ====
Saturday, January 20, 12:00 noon

Sheet 1	1	2	3	4	5	6	7	8	Final
Tingley/O'Neil	0	0	0	1	0	0	X	X	1
Moores/Wheeler	1	1	1	0	4	1	X	X	8

==== Tiebreaker (Pool D) ====
Saturday, January 20, 12:00 noon

Team	1	2	3	4	5	6	7	8	Final
Anderson/Clawson	3	1	2	3	3	X	X	X	12
Rohrbacher/Davis	0	0	0	0	0	X	X	X	0

Saturday, January 20, 4:00 pm

Sheet 2	1	2	3	4	5	6	7	8	Final
Rhyme/Smith	2	0	0	0	1	0	2	0	5
Anderson/Clawson	0	2	2	1	0	1	0	4	10

== Playoffs ==
=== Bracket ===
Quarterfinals
Schultz/McLean	6
Moores/Wheeler	3
Anderson/Dropkin	6
Lanigan/Evenson	3
McMakin/Fenson	6
Anderson/Clawson	5
Stolt/Stolt	8
Foote/Hagberg	2

Semifinals
Schultz/McLean	0
Anderson/Dropkin	8
McMakin/Fenson	6
Stolt/Stolt	7

Final
Anderson/Dropkin	6
Stolt/Stolt	3

=== Quarterfinals ===
Saturday, January 20, 8:00pm

Team	1	2	3	4	5	6	7	8	Final
Schultz/McLean	2	0	1	0	0	1	1	1	6
Moores/Wheeler	0	1	0	1	1	0	0	0	3

Team	1	2	3	4	5	6	7	8	Final
Anderson/Dropkin	1	0	1	1	1	2	0	X	6
Lanigan/Evenson	0	1	0	0	0	0	2	X	3

Team	1	2	3	4	5	6	7	8	9	Final
McMakin/Fenson	2	0	1	0	0	1	1	0	1	6
Anderson/Clawson	0	1	0	2	1	0	0	1	0	5

Team	1	2	3	4	5	6	7	8	Final
Stolt/Stolt	1	0	1	2	0	1	3	X	8
Foote/Hagberg	0	1	0	0	1	0	0	X	2

=== Semifinals ===
Sunday, January 21, 10:00am

Team	1	2	3	4	5	6	7	8	Final
Schultz/McLean	0	0	0	0	X	X	X	X	0
Anderson/Dropkin	4	2	1	1	X	X	X	X	8

Team	1	2	3	4	5	6	7	8	9	Final
McMakin/Fenson	2	0	1	0	1	1	0	1	0	6
Stolt/Stolt	0	2	0	1	0	0	3	0	1	7

=== Finals ===
Sunday, January 21, 2:00pm

Team	1	2	3	4	5	6	7	8	Final
Anderson/Dropkin	1	1	0	1	1	0	1	1	6
Stolt/Stolt	0	0	1	0	0	2	0	0	3
