= 2017 United States Men's Curling Championship =

- Host city: Everett, Washington
- Arena: Xfinity Arena
- Dates: February 11–18
- Winner: Team Shuster
- Curling club: Duluth Curling Club, Duluth, Minnesota
- Skip: John Shuster
- Third: Tyler George
- Second: Matt Hamilton
- Lead: John Landsteiner
- Finalist: Todd Birr

The 2017 United States Men's Curling Championship was held from February 11 to 18 at the Xfinity Arena in Everett, Washington. It was held in conjunction with the 2017 United States Women's Curling Championship.

== Teams ==
Ten teams qualified to participate in the 2017 national championship.

Skip	Third	Second	Lead	Locale
Todd Birr	Rich Ruohonen	John Benton	Tom O'Connor	Blaine, Minnesota
Craig Brown	Kroy Nernberger	Jason Smith	Sean Beighton	Blaine, Minnesota
Brady Clark	Greg Persinger	Colin Hufman	Phil Tilker	Seattle, Washington
Hunter Clawson	Cody Clouser	Caleb Clawson	Andrew Dunnam	Laurel, Maryland
Stephen Dropkin	Ethan Meyers	Trevor Host	Brandon Myhre	Minneapolis, Minnesota
Pete Fenson	Jared Zezel	Mark Fenner	Alex Fenson	Bemidji, Minnesota
Alex Leichter	Martin Sather	Nate Clark	Ryan Hallisey	Boston, Massachusetts
Heath McCormick	Chris Plys	Korey Dropkin	Thomas Howell	Blaine, Minnesota
John Shuster	Tyler George	Matt Hamilton	John Landsteiner	Duluth, Minnesota
Darryl Sobering	Aaron Johnston	Evan Jaffe	Josh Chetwynd	Denver, Colorado

== Round-robin standings ==
Final round-robin standings

Key
Teams to playoffs
Teams to tiebreakers

Skip	W	L
John Shuster	9	0
Brady Clark	7	2
Todd Birr	6	3
Craig Brown	5	4
Pete Fenson	5	4
Hunter Clawson	4	5
Alex Leichter	4	5
Heath McCormick	4	5
Darryl Sobering	1	8
Stephen Dropkin	0	9

== Round-robin results ==
All draw times are listed in Central Standard Time.

=== Draw 1 ===
Saturday, February 11, 8:00pm

Team	1	2	3	4	5	6	7	8	9	10	Final
Craig Brown	0	3	0	1	0	1	0	0	0	3	8
Stephen Dropkin	0	0	3	0	2	0	0	1	0	0	6

Team	1	2	3	4	5	6	7	8	9	10	Final
Darryl Sobering	0	0	1	0	0	0	1	0	X	X	2
Brady Clark	0	4	0	0	0	1	0	4	X	X	9

Team	1	2	3	4	5	6	7	8	9	10	Final
Todd Birr	2	4	0	3	0	1	X	X	X	X	10
Heath McCormick	0	0	1	0	1	0	X	X	X	X	2

Team	1	2	3	4	5	6	7	8	9	10	Final
Pete Fenson	0	2	0	0	1	0	0	0	X	X	3
Alex Leichter	0	0	1	2	0	0	1	3	X	X	7

Team	1	2	3	4	5	6	7	8	9	10	Final
Hunter Clawson	1	0	1	0	0	1	0	0	X	X	3
John Shuster	0	1	0	3	3	0	1	1	X	X	9

=== Draw 2 ===
Sunday, February 12, 12:00pm

Team	1	2	3	4	5	6	7	8	9	10	Final
Pete Fenson	0	0	1	0	0	1	1	0	0	X	3
John Shuster	1	1	0	3	0	0	0	0	2	X	7

Team	1	2	3	4	5	6	7	8	9	10	Final
Heath McCormick	0	2	1	2	3	0	1	X	X	X	9
Alex Leichter	2	0	0	0	0	1	0	X	X	X	3

Team	1	2	3	4	5	6	7	8	9	10	Final
Hunter Clawson	1	0	3	1	0	0	1	0	2	X	8
Darryl Sobering	0	1	0	0	0	1	0	1	0	X	3

Team	1	2	3	4	5	6	7	8	9	10	Final
Brady Clark	0	1	1	0	0	2	0	0	1	0	5
Craig Brown	2	0	0	1	0	0	0	2	0	3	8

Team	1	2	3	4	5	6	7	8	9	10	Final
Stephen Dropkin	0	0	2	0	2	0	2	0	1	0	7
Todd Birr	1	2	0	2	0	1	0	1	0	1	8

=== Draw 3 ===
Sunday, February 12, 8:00pm

Team	1	2	3	4	5	6	7	8	9	10	Final
Brady Clark	1	1	0	1	0	0	2	1	1	X	7
Hunter Clawson	0	0	1	0	2	0	0	0	0	X	3

Team	1	2	3	4	5	6	7	8	9	10	Final
Todd Birr	0	2	1	0	1	0	1	0	1	0	6
Pete Fenson	1	0	0	2	0	1	0	1	0	2	7

Team	1	2	3	4	5	6	7	8	9	10	Final
John Shuster	0	0	1	0	2	1	0	0	0	2	6
Alex Leichter	0	1	0	2	0	0	0	2	0	0	5

Team	1	2	3	4	5	6	7	8	9	10	Final
Darryl Sobering	2	0	2	0	2	1	0	0	0	2	9
Stephen Dropkin	0	3	0	1	0	0	1	2	1	0	8

Team	1	2	3	4	5	6	7	8	9	10	Final
Craig Brown	0	1	0	0	2	1	0	2	0	1	7
Heath McCormick	2	0	0	2	0	0	1	0	1	0	6

=== Draw 4 ===
Monday, February 13, 2:00pm

Team	1	2	3	4	5	6	7	8	9	10	Final
Todd Birr	1	1	0	0	2	0	0	2	0	0	6
Alex Leichter	0	0	1	0	0	2	0	0	1	1	5

Team	1	2	3	4	5	6	7	8	9	10	Final
Hunter Clawson	0	1	0	1	0	1	1	0	0	1	5
Craig Brown	1	0	1	0	1	0	0	0	1	0	4

Team	1	2	3	4	5	6	7	8	9	10	Final
Brady Clark	1	0	1	0	2	2	0	3	X	X	9
Stephen Dropkin	0	1	0	1	0	0	1	0	X	X	3

Team	1	2	3	4	5	6	7	8	9	10	Final
John Shuster	1	0	1	0	1	0	0	1	0	1	5
Heath McCormick	0	0	0	1	0	0	1	0	1	0	3

Team	1	2	3	4	5	6	7	8	9	10	Final
Darryl Sobering	0	0	0	0	1	0	1	X	X	X	2
Pete Fenson	1	0	1	2	0	4	0	X	X	X	8

=== Draw 5 ===
Tuesday, February 14, 8:00am

Team	1	2	3	4	5	6	7	8	9	10	Final
Heath McCormick	1	0	0	1	1	1	0	4	X	X	8
Darryl Sobering	0	1	0	0	0	0	1	0	X	X	2

Team	1	2	3	4	5	6	7	8	9	10	Final
Stephen Dropkin	2	0	1	0	1	0	0	2	0	0	6
John Shuster	0	2	0	2	0	1	0	0	0	2	7

Team	1	2	3	4	5	6	7	8	9	10	Final
Craig Brown	0	2	0	3	0	2	0	1	X	X	8
Pete Fenson	0	0	1	0	1	0	1	0	X	X	3

Team	1	2	3	4	5	6	7	8	9	10	11	Final
Hunter Clawson	1	0	0	2	0	2	0	1	0	1	0	7
Todd Birr	0	2	0	0	1	0	2	0	2	0	1	8

Team	1	2	3	4	5	6	7	8	9	10	Final
Brady Clark	1	0	0	0	2	0	4	1	X	X	8
Alex Leichter	0	2	0	0	0	0	0	0	X	X	2

=== Draw 6 ===
Tuesday, February 14, 4:00pm

Team	1	2	3	4	5	6	7	8	9	10	Final
John Shuster	1	1	0	2	0	1	0	2	0	1	8
Craig Brown	0	0	2	0	2	0	0	0	1	0	5

Team	1	2	3	4	5	6	7	8	9	10	Final
Brady Clark	1	1	0	0	2	0	4	1	X	X	9
Todd Birr	0	0	1	2	0	1	0	0	X	X	4

Team	1	2	3	4	5	6	7	8	9	10	Final
Heath McCormick	3	2	0	2	1	0	X	X	X	X	8
Hunter Clawson	0	0	1	0	0	1	X	X	X	X	2

Team	1	2	3	4	5	6	7	8	9	10	Final
Alex Leichter	1	0	4	0	0	0	4	X	X	X	9
Darryl Sobering	0	1	0	0	1	1	0	X	X	X	3

Team	1	2	3	4	5	6	7	8	9	10	Final
Pete Fenson	2	0	1	1	0	1	2	0	X	X	7
Stephen Dropkin	0	1	0	0	2	0	0	1	X	X	4

=== Draw 7 ===
Wednesday, February 15, 9:00am

Team	1	2	3	4	5	6	7	8	9	10	Final
Hunter Clawson	1	0	0	0	2	0	0	1	0	X	4
Pete Fenson	0	1	2	0	0	2	0	0	2	X	7

Team	1	2	3	4	5	6	7	8	9	10	Final
Alex Leichter	0	0	0	3	0	2	1	0	0	1	7
Stephen Dropkin	1	1	0	0	2	0	0	2	0	0	6

Team	1	2	3	4	5	6	7	8	9	10	Final
Darryl Sobering	0	0	1	0	0	0	3	0	1	0	5
John Shuster	2	1	0	0	0	1	0	2	0	2	8

Team	1	2	3	4	5	6	7	8	9	10	Final
Heath McCormick	0	1	0	2	0	1	1	1	0	0	6
Brady Clark	0	0	1	0	3	0	0	0	2	1	7

Team	1	2	3	4	5	6	7	8	9	10	Final
Todd Birr	1	0	0	1	0	0	2	0	2	2	8
Craig Brown	0	0	2	0	0	2	0	1	0	0	5

=== Draw 8 ===
Wednesday, February 15, 7:00pm

Team	1	2	3	4	5	6	7	8	9	10	Final
Darryl Sobering	0	0	1	0	0	X	X	X	X	X	1
Todd Birr	4	2	0	0	3	X	X	X	X	X	9

Team	1	2	3	4	5	6	7	8	9	10	Final
Pete Fenson	1	1	1	0	2	0	2	2	X	X	9
Heath McCormick	0	0	0	2	0	1	0	0	X	X	3

Team	1	2	3	4	5	6	7	8	9	10	Final
Alex Leichter	2	0	0	2	0	0	0	0	0	1	5
Craig Brown	0	2	0	0	0	0	0	0	1	0	3

Team	1	2	3	4	5	6	7	8	9	10	Final
Stephen Dropkin	2	0	0	0	2	0	1	0	0	1	6
Hunter Clawson	0	0	1	1	0	2	0	2	2	0	8

Team	1	2	3	4	5	6	7	8	9	10	Final
John Shuster	0	2	0	4	0	2	X	X	X	X	8
Brady Clark	1	0	1	0	1	0	X	X	X	X	3

=== Draw 9 ===
Thursday, February 16, 12:00pm

=== Tiebreaker ===
Thursday, February 16, 8:00pm

Team	1	2	3	4	5	6	7	8	9	10	Final
Craig Brown	0	2	0	0	0	1	0	0	2	1	6
Pete Fenson	0	0	0	2	0	0	1	1	0	0	4

== Playoffs ==
Page playoff system
1	John Shuster	6
2	Brady Clark	4
3	Todd Birr	7
4	Craig Brown	6

Semifinal
2	Brady Clark	5
3	Todd Birr	8

Final
1	John Shuster	8
3	Todd Birr	7

=== 1 vs. 2 ===
Friday, February 17, 9:00am PT

Team	1	2	3	4	5	6	7	8	9	10	Final
John Shuster	2	0	0	1	0	0	0	1	0	2	6
Brady Clark	0	2	0	0	0	1	0	0	1	0	4

Player percentages
John Shuster		Brady Clark	
John Landsteiner	90%	Phil Tilker	90%
Matt Hamilton	91%	Colin Hufman	76%
Tyler George	77%	Greg Persinger	81%
John Shuster	96%	Brady Clark	85%
Total	88%	Total	83%

=== 3 vs. 4 ===
Friday, February 17, 9:00am PT

Team	1	2	3	4	5	6	7	8	9	10	11	Final
Todd Birr	0	0	0	1	2	2	0	0	1	0	1	7
Craig Brown	0	2	1	0	0	0	1	1	0	1	0	6

Player percentages
Todd Birr		Craig Brown	
Tom O'Connor	80%	Sean Beighton	88%
John Benton	83%	Jason Smith	79%
Rich Ruohonen	77%	Kroy Nernberger	81%
Todd Birr	63%	Craig Brown	78%
Total	76%	Total	82%

=== Semifinal ===
Friday, February 17, 7:00pm PT

Team	1	2	3	4	5	6	7	8	9	10	Final
Brady Clark	1	0	2	0	0	1	0	1	0	X	5
Todd Birr	0	2	0	3	0	0	2	0	1	X	8

Player percentages
Brady Clark		Todd Birr	
Phil Tilker	94%	Tom O'Connor	74%
Colin Hufman	86%	John Benton	98%
Greg Persinger	79%	Rich Ruohonen	82%
Brady Clark	75%	Todd Birr	91%
Total	83%	Total	87%

=== Final ===
Saturday, February 18, 3:00 pm PT

Team	1	2	3	4	5	6	7	8	9	10	Final
John Shuster	1	0	1	0	2	0	3	0	0	1	8
Todd Birr	0	1	0	4	0	1	0	1	0	0	7

Player percentages
John Shuster		Todd Birr	
John Landsteiner	82%	Tom O'Connor	90%
Matt Hamilton	77%	John Benton	91%
Tyler George	79%	Rich Ruohonen	81%
John Shuster	81%	Todd Birr	73%
Total	80%	Total	84%
