= Alex Fenson =

American curler

Alex Fenson is an American curler.

== Early life and education ==
Fenson began curling at age seven. He attended Bemidji High School and Bemidji State University and graduated with a degree in exercise science. He is attending optometry school at the University of Missouri–St. Louis. His father, Pete Fenson; his grandfather, Bob Fenson; and his brother, Graem Fenson, are also curlers.

== Career ==
Fenson was on a team with Korey Dropkin, Joe Polo, Mark Fenner and Tom Howell that competed in Junior National Championships, World Junior Championships and National Championships. They were runner-up at the 2016 World Junior Championship. In 2021, they won the National Championship and were runner-up at the U.S. Olympic Trials.

In 2018 Fenson competed at the USA Curling National Championships in Fargo, N.D. on a team that included his father.
