= 2015 United States Mixed Doubles Curling Championship =

- Host city: Eau Claire, Wisconsin
- Arena: Eau Claire Curling Club
- Dates: December 3-7, 2014
- Winner: Sarah Anderson and Korey Dropkin

The 2015 United States Mixed Doubles Curling Championship was held from December 3-7, 2014 at the Eau Claire Curling Club in Eau Claire, Wisconsin. Sarah Anderson and Korey Dropkin won the tournament, earning the right to represent the United States at the 2015 World Mixed Doubles Curling Championship in Sochi, Russia.

== Teams ==
Twenty three teams qualified to compete in the championship.

Female	Male	State(s)
Nicole Bera	Michael Bera	Wisconsin
Cory Christensen	Derek Benson	Minnesota
Cristin Clark	Brady Clark	Washington
Christon Clark	Logan Tingley	Indiana, Ohio
Sarah Anderson	Korey Dropkin	Minnesota
Taylor Anderson	Scott Dunnam	Minnesota, Pennsylvania
Sarah Thuriot	Matt Fowler	Minnesota
Courtney George	Tyler George	Minnesota
Dena Rosenberry	Darrick Kizlyk	Colorado
Desiree Laitinen	Doug Weimerskirch	Minnesota
Jiyoung Lee	Thomas Lee	Washington
Kim Roden	Gary Mazzota	Minnesota
Joyance Meechai	Steven Gebauer	New York, Minnesota
Emilia Juocys	Sean Murray	Michigan, Wisconsin
Therese Olson	Scott Olson	Massachusetts
Laura Roessler	Mike Peplinski	Wisconsin
Tina Persinger	Mark Fenner	Alaska, Minnesota
Elaine Smith-Koop	Joshua Engle	Oregon
Maureen Stolt	Peter Stolt	Minnesota
Lynn Struzan	Steve Swoboda	Wisconsin
Larissa Unruh	Sam Unruh	North Dakota
Sharon Vukich	David Cornfield	Washington
Stephanie Martin	Dan Wiza	Illinois, Wisconsin

== Round robin ==
=== Standings ===
Key
Teams to playoffs
Teams to Tiebreaker

Pool A	W	L
Clark / Clark	5	0
Peplinski / Roessler	4	1
Bera / Bera	3	2
Vukich / Cornfield	2	3
Smith-Koop / Engle	1	4
Fowler / Thuriot	0	5

Pool B	W	L
Persinger / Fenner	4	1
Stolt / Stolt	4	1
Christensen / Benson	2	3
Lee / Lee	2	3
Swoboda / Struzan	2	3
Mazzotta / Roden	1	4

Pool C	W	L
Dunnam / Anderson	4	1
Murray / Juocys	4	1
George / George	3	2
Kizlyk / Rosenberry	3	2
Clark / Tingley	1	4
Unruh / Unruh	0	5

Pool D	W	L
Dropkin / Anderson	4	0
Laitinen / Weimerskirch	2	2
Meechai / Gebauer	2	2
Olson / Olson	1	3
Wiza / Martin	1	3

=== Tiebreaker ===
Saturday, December 6, 5:00pm CT

Team	1	2	3	4	5	6	7	8	9	Final
Meechai/Gebauer	0	1	1	1	0	2	0	1	0	6
Laitinen/Weimerskirch	2	0	0	0	1	0	3	0	1	7

== Playoffs ==
=== Bracket ===
Quarterfinals
Dropkin/Anderson	8
Laitinen/Weimerskirch	5
Murray/Joucys	3
Persinger/Fenner	9
Clark/Clark	2
Dunnam/Anderson	9
Stolt/Stolt	6
Peplinski/Roessler	3

Semifinals
Persinger/Fenner	8
Dropkin/Anderson	9
Stolt/Stolt	8
Dunnam/Anderson	7

Final
Dropkin/Anderson	7
Stolt/Stolt	3

=== Quarterfinals ===
Saturday, December 6, 8:00pm

Team	1	2	3	4	5	6	7	8	Final
Dropkin/Anderson	0	2	1	0	1	1	0	3	8
Laitinen/Weimerskirch	1	0	0	2	0	0	2	0	5

Team	1	2	3	4	5	6	7	8	Final
Murray/Juocys	0	0	3	0	0	0	0	X	3
Persinger/Fenner	2	1	0	1	1	2	2	X	9

Team	1	2	3	4	5	6	7	8	Final
Clark/Clark	0	1	0	1	0	0	0	X	2
Dunnam/Anderson	1	0	2	0	1	3	2	X	9

Team	1	2	3	4	5	6	7	8	Final
Stolt/Stolt	1	0	0	2	1	1	0	1	6
Peplinski/Roessler	0	1	1	0	0	0	1	0	3

=== Semifinals ===
Sunday, December 7, 11:00am CT

Team	1	2	3	4	5	6	7	8	Final
Dropkin/Anderson	0	0	4	0	1	0	0	4	9
Persinger/Fenner	1	1	0	2	0	2	2	0	8

Team	1	2	3	4	5	6	7	8	9	Final
Dunnam/Anderson	0	3	0	0	2	1	0	1	0	7
Stolt/Stolt	1	0	3	1	0	0	2	0	1	8

=== Final ===
Sunday, December 7, 2:00pm CT

Team	1	2	3	4	5	6	7	8	Final
Dropkin/Anderson	1	2	1	1	1	0	1	X	7
Stolt/Stolt	0	0	0	0	0	3	0	X	3
