= 2026 GSOC Masters =

Grand Slam of Curling event

2026 P&H Masters
- Host city: Medicine Hat, Alberta
- Arena: Co-op Place
- Dates: November 3–8
- Men's winner: (Manitoba) Team Dunstone
- Curling club: Fort Rouge CC, Winnipeg
- Skip: Matt Dunstone
- Third: Colton Lott
- Second: Colton Flasch
- Lead: Ryan Harnden
- Coach: Scott Pfeifer
- Finalist: (Scotland) Bruce Mouat
- Women's winner: (Sweden) Team Wranå
- Curling club: Sundbybergs CK, Sundbyberg
- Skip: Isabella Wranå
- Third: Almida de Val
- Second: Moa Dryburgh
- Lead: Maria Larsson
- Finalist: (Japan) Miku Nihira

The 2026 P&H Masters was held from November 3 to 8 at Co-op Place in Medicine Hat, Alberta. It was the second Grand Slam event of the 2026–27 curling season.

== Format ==
Each team will play four games during the preliminary round; three against teams in their pool and one crossover game (Pool A vs. Pool C, Pool B vs. Pool D, with the top seed of the pool playing the bottom seed of the opposing pool and the second seed of the pool playing the third seed of the opposing pool), with the top eight teams earning the most points overall advancing to the quarterfinals. A change has been made this event in how points were allocated in the preliminary round in which if a team lost in an extra end shootout and did not have the hammer (last rock) they would not receive a point, but if they did have the hammer they would receive one point for the loss as normal. The goal of the change was to encourage teams to play aggressively for the win in the eighth end rather than play conservatively and settle for a guaranteed point in the shootout.

== Qualification ==
The top 12 ranked men's and women's teams on the World Curling Federation's world team rankings as of September 29, 2026, qualified for the event. In the event that a team declines their invitation, the next-ranked team on the world team ranking is invited until the twelve spots have been filled. The next two spots were given out to two sponsor's exemptions, while the remaining two spots were given out to winners of two GSOC satellite events. In the event that the winning team was already qualified, the next highest finishing team at the event was invited until the spot was filled.

=== Men ===
Means of Qualification	Vacancies	Qualified
World Rankings	12	(Switzerland) Yannick Schwaller (Scotland) Grant Hardie (Manitoba) Matt Dunstone (Scotland) Bruce Mouat (Alberta) Brad Jacobs (United States) Daniel Casper (Sweden) ~~Oskar Eriksson~~ (Alberta) Brendan Bottcher (Scotland) Kyle Waddell (Switzerland) Marco Hösli (Italy) Stefano Spiller (Japan) Tsuyoshi Yamaguchi (Manitoba) John Epping
Sponsor's Exemptions	2	(Alberta) Kevin Koe (Alberta) Evan van Amsterdam
ATB Okotoks Classic	1	(Manitoba) Jordon McDonald
Saville U25 Challenge	1	(Alberta) Peter Hlushak
TOTAL	16	

=== Women ===
Means of Qualification	Vacancies	Qualified
World Rankings	12	(Ontario) Rachel Homan (Switzerland) Xenia Schwaller (South Korea) Gim Eun-ji (Switzerland) Alina Pätz (Manitoba) Kerri Einarson (Sweden) Anna Hasselborg (Japan) Miku Nihira (Sweden) Isabella Wranå (Japan) Satsuki Fujisawa (Japan) Mina Kobayashi (South Korea) Park You-been (Japan) Ikue Kitazawa
Sponsor's Exemptions	2	(Alberta) Serena Gray-Withers (British Columbia) Taylor Reese-Hansen
Autumn Gold Curling Classic	1	(Alberta) Selena Sturmay
Saville U25 Challenge	1	(Ontario) Grace Lloyd
TOTAL	16	

== Men ==
=== Teams ===
The teams are listed as follows:

Skip	Third	Second	Lead	Locale
Brendan Bottcher	Jake Horgan	Tanner Horgan	Geoff Walker	Edmonton, Alberta
Daniel Casper	Luc Violette	Ben Richardson	Aidan Oldenburg	(United States) Chaska, Minnesota
Matt Dunstone	Colton Lott	Colton Flasch (Note: Colton Flasch spared for Mark Nichols who was recovering from an injury.)	Ryan Harnden	Winnipeg, Manitoba
John Epping	B. J. Neufeld	Ryan Wiebe	Ian McMillan	Winnipeg, Manitoba
Ross Whyte (Fourth)	Grant Hardie (Skip)	Craig Waddell	Euan Kyle	Stirling, Scotland
Peter Hlushak	Sahil Dalrymple	Tyler Derksen	Josh Lussier	Edmonton, Alberta
Philipp Hösli (Fourth)	Marco Hösli (Skip)	Simon Gloor	Justin Hausherr	Glarus, Switzerland
Brad Jacobs	Marc Kennedy	Brett Gallant	Ben Hebert	Calgary, Alberta
Kevin Koe	Johnson Tao	Aaron Sluchinski	Karrick Martin	Calgary, Alberta
Jordon McDonald	Jacques Gauthier	Elias Huminicki	Cameron Olafson	Winnipeg, Manitoba
Bruce Mouat	Robin Brydone	Bobby Lammie	Hammy McMillan Jr.	Stirling, Scotland
Benoît Schwarz-van Berkel (Fourth)	Yannick Schwaller (Skip)	Sven Michel	Pablo Lachat-Couchepin	Geneva, Switzerland
Stefano Spiller	Amos Mosaner	Sebastiano Arman	Cesare Spiller	Trentino, Italy
Evan van Amsterdam	Jeremy Harty	Jason Ginter	Parker Konschuh	Edmonton, Alberta
Kyle Waddell	Mark Watt	Duncan McFadzean (Note: Duncan McFadzean spared for Angus Bryce who was recovering from an injury.)	Blair Haswell	Hamilton, Scotland
Riku Yanagisawa (Fourth)	Tsuyoshi Yamaguchi (Skip)	Takeru Yamamoto	Satoshi Koizumi	Karuizawa, Japan

=== Round robin standings ===
Final Round Robin Standings

Key
Teams to Playoffs

Pool A	W	SOW	SOL	L	PF	PA	Pts	LSD
(Switzerland) Marco Hösli	3	1	0	0	32	16	11	0.50
(Switzerland) Yannick Schwaller	3	0	1	0	25	16	10	82.50
(Scotland) Kyle Waddell	1	1	0	2	19	21	5	19.10
(Alberta) Peter Hlushak	0	0	0	4	11	37	0	33.00

Pool B	W	SOW	SOL	L	PF	PA	Pts	LSD
(Scotland) Grant Hardie	3	1	0	0	23	14	11	1.50
(Alberta) Brendan Bottcher	2	0	0	2	17	23	6	0.10
(Italy) Stefano Spiller	1	0	2	1	24	22	3	34.80
(Alberta) Kevin Koe	0	0	0	4	16	26	0	41.90

Pool C	W	SOW	SOL	L	PF	PA	Pts	LSD
(Manitoba) Matt Dunstone	4	0	0	0	32	11	12	22.60
(United States) Daniel Casper	2	0	0	2	22	21	6	181.90
(Alberta) Evan van Amsterdam	1	0	0	3	17	26	3	37.80
(Japan) Tsuyoshi Yamaguchi	0	0	1	3	18	28	0	111.30

Pool D	W	SOW	SOL	L	PF	PA	Pts	LSD
(Scotland) Bruce Mouat	4	0	0	0	21	13	12	44.80
(Manitoba) John Epping	3	0	0	1	29	17	9	15.00
(Manitoba) Jordon McDonald	1	0	0	3	15	22	3	10.40
(Alberta) Brad Jacobs	0	1	0	3	19	27	2	47.70

=== Round robin results ===
All draw times are listed in Mountain Time (UTC−06:00).

==== Draw 1 ====
Tuesday, November 3, 7:30 am

Sheet B	1	2	3	4	5	6	7	8	Final
(Scotland) Bruce Mouat 🔨	1	0	1	0	0	2	1	X	5
(Alberta) Kevin Koe	0	1	0	0	2	0	0	X	3

Sheet D	1	2	3	4	5	6	7	8	9	Final
(Scotland) Kyle Waddell	0	1	0	2	0	1	1	0	1	6
(Japan) Tsuyoshi Yamaguchi 🔨	1	0	1	0	2	0	0	1	0	5

==== Draw 2 ====
Tuesday, November 3, 11:00 am

Sheet C	1	2	3	4	5	6	7	8	Final
(Manitoba) Matt Dunstone 🔨	4	0	4	3	3	X	X	X	14
(Alberta) Peter Hlushak	0	1	0	0	0	X	X	X	1

==== Draw 3 ====
Tuesday, November 3, 3:00 pm

Sheet C	1	2	3	4	5	6	7	8	Final
(Switzerland) Yannick Schwaller 🔨	2	1	0	1	1	0	1	X	6
(Alberta) Evan van Amsterdam	0	0	1	0	0	1	0	X	2

==== Draw 4 ====
Tuesday, November 3, 7:00 pm

Sheet A	1	2	3	4	5	6	7	8	9	Final
(Alberta) Brad Jacobs	0	2	0	0	1	0	2	0	1	6
(Italy) Stefano Spiller 🔨	1	0	1	1	0	1	0	1	0	5

Sheet B	1	2	3	4	5	6	7	8	Final
(Alberta) Brendan Bottcher	0	0	2	1	0	1	0	X	4
(Manitoba) John Epping 🔨	1	2	0	0	1	0	5	X	9

Sheet C	1	2	3	4	5	6	7	8	Final
(United States) Daniel Casper	0	1	0	0	1	0	0	X	2
(Switzerland) Marco Hösli 🔨	1	0	1	3	0	1	1	X	7

Sheet D	1	2	3	4	5	6	7	8	Final
(Scotland) Grant Hardie 🔨	1	1	0	1	1	1	0	X	5
(Manitoba) Jordon McDonald	0	0	1	0	0	0	1	X	2

==== Draw 5 ====
Wednesday, November 4, 7:30 am

Sheet B	1	2	3	4	5	6	7	8	Final
(Scotland) Kyle Waddell	0	1	0	1	0	3	1	X	6
(Alberta) Peter Hlushak 🔨	1	0	1	0	2	0	0	X	4

==== Draw 6 ====
Wednesday, November 4, 11:00 am

Sheet A	1	2	3	4	5	6	7	8	Final
(Scotland) Bruce Mouat	2	1	0	2	0	1	0	X	6
(Manitoba) John Epping 🔨	0	0	1	0	1	0	1	X	3

Sheet B	1	2	3	4	5	6	7	8	Final
(Manitoba) Matt Dunstone 🔨	1	0	1	0	0	2	2	X	6
(Japan) Tsuyoshi Yamaguchi	0	2	0	1	0	0	0	X	3

Sheet C	1	2	3	4	5	6	7	8	9	Final
(Scotland) Grant Hardie	0	1	0	2	0	1	1	0	1	6
(Italy) Stefano Spiller 🔨	1	0	2	0	1	0	0	1	0	5

==== Draw 8 ====
Wednesday, November 4, 7:00 pm

Sheet A	1	2	3	4	5	6	7	8	Final
(United States) Daniel Casper	0	4	0	2	0	3	X	X	9
(Alberta) Evan van Amsterdam 🔨	1	0	1	0	1	0	X	X	3

Sheet B	1	2	3	4	5	6	7	8	Final
(Alberta) Brad Jacobs	0	2	0	0	1	0	2	0	5
(Manitoba) Jordon McDonald 🔨	1	0	3	0	0	1	0	2	7

Sheet C	1	2	3	4	5	6	7	8	Final
(Alberta) Brendan Bottcher 🔨	1	0	1	0	2	0	1	0	5
(Alberta) Kevin Koe	0	2	0	1	0	0	0	1	4

Sheet D	1	2	3	4	5	6	7	8	9	Final
(Switzerland) Yannick Schwaller	0	0	2	0	2	0	3	0	0	7
(Switzerland) Marco Hösli 🔨	0	1	0	1	0	3	0	2	1	8

==== Draw 10 ====
Thursday, November 5, 11:00 am

Sheet A	1	2	3	4	5	6	7	8	Final
(Switzerland) Yannick Schwaller	2	2	0	1	0	1	0	X	6
(Alberta) Peter Hlushak 🔨	0	0	0	0	1	0	1	X	2

Sheet C	1	2	3	4	5	6	7	8	Final
(United States) Daniel Casper	1	1	0	0	1	1	0	3	7
(Japan) Tsuyoshi Yamaguchi 🔨	0	0	2	1	0	0	2	0	5

Sheet D	1	2	3	4	5	6	7	8	Final
(Manitoba) Matt Dunstone 🔨	1	2	0	1	0	1	0	1	6
(Alberta) Evan van Amsterdam	0	0	1	0	1	0	1	0	3

==== Draw 11 ====
Thursday, November 5, 3:00 pm

Sheet A	1	2	3	4	5	6	7	8	Final
(Alberta) Brendan Bottcher 🔨	0	1	1	0	1	0	0	2	5
(Italy) Stefano Spiller	1	0	0	1	0	1	0	0	3

Sheet C	1	2	3	4	5	6	7	8	Final
(Scotland) Bruce Mouat	1	1	1	0	1	0	0	X	4
(Manitoba) Jordon McDonald 🔨	0	0	0	1	0	0	1	X	2

==== Draw 12 ====
Thursday, November 5, 7:00 pm

Sheet A	1	2	3	4	5	6	7	8	Final
(Scotland) Kyle Waddell 🔨	0	0	1	1	0	0	1	X	3
(Switzerland) Marco Hösli	1	1	0	0	3	1	0	X	6

Sheet B	1	2	3	4	5	6	7	8	Final
(Scotland) Grant Hardie 🔨	2	0	1	0	0	0	0	2	5
(Alberta) Kevin Koe	0	1	0	1	0	0	2	0	4

Sheet D	1	2	3	4	5	6	7	8	Final
(Alberta) Brad Jacobs	0	2	0	1	0	X	X	X	3
(Manitoba) John Epping 🔨	4	0	2	0	3	X	X	X	9

==== Draw 13 ====
Friday, November 6, 7:30 am

Sheet B	1	2	3	4	5	6	7	8	Final
(Japan) Tsuyoshi Yamaguchi	0	3	0	1	0	1	0	X	5
(Alberta) Evan van Amsterdam 🔨	3	0	2	0	3	0	1	X	9

==== Draw 14 ====
Friday, November 6, 11:00 am

Sheet A	1	2	3	4	5	6	7	8	Final
(Manitoba) John Epping 🔨	1	0	3	0	0	3	1	X	8
(Manitoba) Jordon McDonald	0	2	0	1	1	0	0	X	4

Sheet B	1	2	3	4	5	6	7	8	Final
(Switzerland) Marco Hösli 🔨	2	1	0	0	4	0	4	X	11
(Alberta) Peter Hlushak	0	0	2	0	0	2	0	X	4

==== Draw 15 ====
Friday, November 6, 3:00 pm

Sheet B	1	2	3	4	5	6	7	8	Final
(Alberta) Brad Jacobs 🔨	1	0	1	0	1	0	0	2	5
(Scotland) Bruce Mouat	0	2	0	2	0	2	0	0	6

Sheet C	1	2	3	4	5	6	7	8	Final
(Switzerland) Yannick Schwaller 🔨	1	1	0	2	0	1	0	1	6
(Scotland) Kyle Waddell	0	0	1	0	1	0	2	0	4

Sheet D	1	2	3	4	5	6	7	8	Final
(Italy) Stefano Spiller	0	2	0	4	0	5	X	X	11
(Alberta) Kevin Koe 🔨	1	0	2	0	2	0	X	X	5

==== Draw 16 ====
Friday, November 6, 7:00 pm

Sheet B	1	2	3	4	5	6	7	8	Final
(Manitoba) Matt Dunstone 🔨	2	0	2	0	0	2	0	X	6
(United States) Daniel Casper	0	2	0	0	1	0	1	X	4

Sheet D	1	2	3	4	5	6	7	8	Final
(Scotland) Grant Hardie	0	1	1	0	0	2	0	3	7
(Alberta) Brendan Bottcher 🔨	1	0	0	1	0	0	1	0	3

=== Playoffs ===
Quarterfinals
1	(Manitoba) Matt Dunstone	7
8	(United States) Daniel Casper	5
4	(Scotland) Grant Hardie	3
5	(Switzerland) Yannick Schwaller	7
2	(Scotland) Bruce Mouat	6
7	(Alberta) Brendan Bottcher	5
3	(Switzerland) Marco Hösli	7
6	(Manitoba) John Epping	4

Semifinals
1	(Manitoba) Matt Dunstone	5
5	(Switzerland) Yannick Schwaller	3
2	(Scotland) Bruce Mouat	7
3	(Switzerland) Marco Hösli	3

Final
1	(Manitoba) Matt Dunstone	7
2	(Scotland) Bruce Mouat	6

==== Quarterfinals ====
Saturday, November 7, 11:30 am

Sheet A	1	2	3	4	5	6	7	8	Final
(Scotland) Bruce Mouat 🔨	2	0	1	0	0	1	0	2	6
(Alberta) Brendan Bottcher	0	2	0	1	0	0	2	0	5

Sheet B	1	2	3	4	5	6	7	8	Final
(Manitoba) Matt Dunstone 🔨	1	0	2	0	0	2	0	2	7
(United States) Daniel Casper	0	2	0	0	1	0	2	0	5

Sheet C	1	2	3	4	5	6	7	8	Final
(Scotland) Grant Hardie 🔨	1	0	0	2	0	0	0	X	3
(Switzerland) Yannick Schwaller	0	1	1	0	2	1	2	X	7

Sheet D	1	2	3	4	5	6	7	8	Final
(Switzerland) Marco Hösli 🔨	1	0	3	1	0	1	0	1	7
(Manitoba) John Epping	0	1	0	0	1	0	2	0	4

==== Semifinals ====
Saturday, November 7, 7:00 pm

Sheet B	1	2	3	4	5	6	7	8	Final
(Manitoba) Matt Dunstone 🔨	0	1	0	0	1	0	2	1	5
(Switzerland) Yannick Schwaller	1	0	0	1	0	1	0	0	3

Sheet C	1	2	3	4	5	6	7	8	Final
(Scotland) Bruce Mouat 🔨	2	0	0	3	0	2	X	X	7
(Switzerland) Marco Hösli	0	1	1	0	1	0	X	X	3

==== Final ====
Sunday, November 8, 11:00 am

Sheet C	1	2	3	4	5	6	7	8	Final
(Manitoba) Matt Dunstone	2	1	0	3	0	1	0	0	7
(Scotland) Bruce Mouat 🔨	0	0	1	0	2	0	2	1	6

== Women ==
=== Teams ===
The teams are listed as follows:

Skip	Third	Second	Lead	Alternate	Locale
Kerri Einarson	Shannon Birchard	Karlee Burgess	Jocelyn Peterman		Gimli, Manitoba
Satsuki Fujisawa	Yako Matsuzawa	Yumi Suzuki	Yurika Yoshida		Kitami, Japan
Kim Min-ji (Fourth)	Gim Eun-ji (Skip)	Kim Su-ji	Seol Ye-eun	Seol Ye-ji	Uijeongbu, South Korea
Serena Gray-Withers	Catherine Clifford	Laura Walker	Zoe Cinnamon		Edmonton, Alberta
Anna Hasselborg	Sara McManus	Agnes Knochenhauer	Sofia Scharback		Sundbyberg, Sweden
Rachel Homan	Tracy Fleury	Emma Miskew	Rachelle Brown (Note: Rachelle Brown spared for Sarah Wilkes who was recovering from an injury.)	Sarah Wilkes	Ottawa, Ontario
Ikue Kitazawa	Seina Nakajima	Minori Suzuki	Hasumi Ishigooka		Nagano, Japan
Mina Kobayashi	Kaho Onodera	Yuna Kotani	Anna Ohmiya		Sapporo, Japan
Grace Lloyd	Evelyn Robert	Michaela Robert	Rachel Steele		Whitby, Ontario
Miku Nihira	Momoha Tabata	Sae Yamamoto	Mikoto Nakajima		Sapporo, Japan
Park You-been	Park Seo-jin	Yang Tae-i	Kim Su-jin		Chuncheon, South Korea
Alina Pätz	Selina Witschonke	Stefanie Berset	Renée Frigo		Geneva, Switzerland
Taylor Reese-Hansen	Megan McGillivray	Kim Bonneau	Julianna Mackenzie		Victoria, British Columbia
Xenia Schwaller	Selina Gafner	Fabienne Rieder	Selina Rychiger		Zurich, Switzerland
Selena Sturmay	Danielle Schmiemann	Dezaray Hawes	Paige Papley		Edmonton, Alberta
Isabella Wranå	Almida de Val	Moa Dryburgh	Maria Larsson		Sundbyberg, Sweden

=== Round robin standings ===
Final Round Robin Standings

Key
Teams to Playoffs
Teams to Tiebreaker

Pool A	W	SOW	SOL	L	PF	PA	Pts	LSD
(Ontario) Rachel Homan	2	1	1	0	22	18	8	99.60
(Sweden) Isabella Wranå	2	0	2	0	26	20	7	15.60
(Japan) Satsuki Fujisawa	2	0	0	2	24	22	6	352.80
(Ontario) Grace Lloyd	0	0	0	4	10	29	0	42.30

Pool B	W	SOW	SOL	L	PF	PA	Pts	LSD
(Switzerland) Xenia Schwaller	3	0	1	0	27	17	9	79.70
(Japan) Miku Nihira	2	0	0	2	19	21	6	89.80
(British Columbia) Taylor Reese-Hansen	2	0	0	2	24	21	6	182.90
(Japan) Mina Kobayashi	1	0	0	3	12	24	3	148.60

Pool C	W	SOW	SOL	L	PF	PA	Pts	LSD
(South Korea) Gim Eun-ji	3	0	1	0	32	22	10	47.10
(Alberta) Selena Sturmay	2	1	0	1	26	23	8	99.60
(Sweden) Anna Hasselborg	1	1	0	2	29	28	5	62.00
(South Korea) Park You-been	0	1	0	3	24	31	2	45.50

Pool D	W	SOW	SOL	L	PF	PA	Pts	LSD
(Japan) Ikue Kitazawa	3	0	0	1	26	19	9	66.20
(Switzerland) Alina Pätz	2	0	1	1	26	23	7	37.30
(Alberta) Serena Gray-Withers	0	2	0	2	22	26	4	77.00
(Manitoba) Kerri Einarson	0	1	1	2	16	21	2	101.40

=== Round robin results ===
All draw times are listed in Mountain Time (UTC−06:00).

==== Draw 1 ====
Tuesday, November 3, 7:30 am

Sheet A	1	2	3	4	5	6	7	8	Final
(South Korea) Gim Eun-ji	3	1	1	3	0	X	X	X	8
(Ontario) Grace Lloyd 🔨	0	0	0	0	2	X	X	X	2

Sheet C	1	2	3	4	5	6	7	8	Final
(Japan) Miku Nihira	0	1	0	1	1	0	1	0	4
(Japan) Ikue Kitazawa 🔨	2	0	1	0	0	2	0	1	6

==== Draw 2 ====
Tuesday, November 3, 11:00 am

Sheet A	1	2	3	4	5	6	7	8	9	Final
(Ontario) Rachel Homan	0	0	1	0	1	1	0	1	0	4
(Alberta) Selena Sturmay 🔨	1	1	0	1	0	0	1	0	1	5

Sheet B	1	2	3	4	5	6	7	8	9	Final
(Switzerland) Xenia Schwaller	0	1	0	2	0	1	0	1	0	5
(Alberta) Serena Gray-Withers 🔨	1	0	1	0	1	0	2	0	1	6

Sheet D	1	2	3	4	5	6	7	8	Final
(Sweden) Anna Hasselborg 🔨	0	1	0	3	0	2	0	1	7
(Japan) Satsuki Fujisawa	0	0	5	0	2	0	1	0	8

==== Draw 3 ====
Tuesday, November 3, 3:00 pm

Sheet A	1	2	3	4	5	6	7	8	Final
(Switzerland) Alina Pätz 🔨	0	2	0	1	2	1	0	1	7
(British Columbia) Taylor Reese-Hansen	4	0	1	0	0	0	3	0	8

Sheet B	1	2	3	4	5	6	7	8	Final
(Manitoba) Kerri Einarson	0	1	0	0	1	0	1	0	3
(Japan) Mina Kobayashi 🔨	1	0	1	1	0	0	0	1	4

Sheet D	1	2	3	4	5	6	7	8	9	Final
(Sweden) Isabella Wranå 🔨	3	0	0	0	2	0	1	0	0	6
(South Korea) Park You-been	0	1	0	1	0	2	0	2	1	7

==== Draw 5 ====
Wednesday, November 4, 7:30 am

Sheet A	1	2	3	4	5	6	7	8	Final
(Switzerland) Xenia Schwaller 🔨	0	1	0	0	0	1	0	4	6
(Japan) Mina Kobayashi	0	0	1	1	1	0	1	0	4

Sheet C	1	2	3	4	5	6	7	8	Final
(Sweden) Isabella Wranå 🔨	2	0	2	4	0	0	0	X	8
(Ontario) Grace Lloyd	0	1	0	0	1	1	1	X	4

Sheet D	1	2	3	4	5	6	7	8	Final
(Japan) Ikue Kitazawa	0	1	1	0	2	1	1	X	6
(Manitoba) Kerri Einarson 🔨	1	0	0	1	0	0	0	X	2

==== Draw 6 ====
Wednesday, November 4, 11:00 am

Sheet D	1	2	3	4	5	6	7	8	Final
(South Korea) Gim Eun-ji 🔨	2	0	3	0	2	0	3	X	10
(Alberta) Selena Sturmay	0	1	0	3	0	2	0	X	6

==== Draw 7 ====
Wednesday, November 4, 3:00 pm

Sheet A	1	2	3	4	5	6	7	8	Final
(Sweden) Anna Hasselborg	1	1	0	2	0	3	0	2	9
(South Korea) Park You-been 🔨	0	0	2	0	3	0	2	0	7

Sheet B	1	2	3	4	5	6	7	8	Final
(Japan) Miku Nihira 🔨	0	2	0	0	0	0	2	1	5
(British Columbia) Taylor Reese-Hansen	1	0	0	1	1	1	0	0	4

Sheet C	1	2	3	4	5	6	7	8	Final
(Ontario) Rachel Homan	1	0	2	0	3	0	0	1	7
(Japan) Satsuki Fujisawa 🔨	0	1	0	3	0	0	1	0	5

Sheet D	1	2	3	4	5	6	7	8	Final
(Switzerland) Alina Pätz 🔨	0	2	0	1	0	1	0	3	7
(Alberta) Serena Gray-Withers	1	0	1	0	1	0	1	0	4

==== Draw 9 ====
Thursday, November 5, 7:30 am

Sheet A	1	2	3	4	5	6	7	8	Final
(Sweden) Isabella Wranå 🔨	1	0	2	0	1	2	1	X	7
(Japan) Satsuki Fujisawa	0	2	0	1	0	0	0	X	3

Sheet B	1	2	3	4	5	6	7	8	Final
(South Korea) Park You-been 🔨	1	0	0	0	1	1	0	X	3
(Alberta) Selena Sturmay	0	0	2	2	0	0	4	X	8

Sheet C	1	2	3	4	5	6	7	8	Final
(Alberta) Serena Gray-Withers 🔨	2	0	0	0	2	0	1	0	5
(Japan) Ikue Kitazawa	0	1	1	1	0	3	0	2	8

Sheet D	1	2	3	4	5	6	7	8	Final
(Japan) Mina Kobayashi 🔨	0	1	0	1	0	1	0	X	3
(British Columbia) Taylor Reese-Hansen	1	0	1	0	3	0	2	X	7

==== Draw 10 ====
Thursday, November 5, 11:00 am

Sheet B	1	2	3	4	5	6	7	8	9	Final
(South Korea) Gim Eun-ji 🔨	1	0	1	0	1	0	3	0	0	6
(Sweden) Anna Hasselborg	0	2	0	1	0	2	0	1	1	7

==== Draw 11 ====
Thursday, November 5, 3:00 pm

Sheet B	1	2	3	4	5	6	7	8	Final
(Ontario) Rachel Homan 🔨	0	1	1	1	1	0	0	1	5
(Ontario) Grace Lloyd	2	0	0	0	0	1	0	0	3

Sheet D	1	2	3	4	5	6	7	8	Final
(Switzerland) Xenia Schwaller 🔨	2	3	2	3	0	X	X	X	10
(Japan) Miku Nihira	0	0	0	0	2	X	X	X	2

==== Draw 12 ====
Thursday, November 5, 7:00 pm

Sheet C	1	2	3	4	5	6	7	8	9	Final
(Manitoba) Kerri Einarson	1	0	0	2	0	0	0	1	1	5
(Switzerland) Alina Pätz 🔨	0	2	0	0	0	1	1	0	0	4

==== Draw 13 ====
Friday, November 6, 7:30 am

Sheet A	1	2	3	4	5	6	7	8	Final
(Japan) Miku Nihira 🔨	2	0	2	2	2	X	X	X	8
(Japan) Mina Kobayashi	0	1	0	0	0	X	X	X	1

Sheet C	1	2	3	4	5	6	7	8	Final
(South Korea) Gim Eun-ji 🔨	1	0	2	0	2	3	0	0	8
(South Korea) Park You-been	0	3	0	1	0	0	2	1	7

Sheet D	1	2	3	4	5	6	7	8	Final
(Japan) Satsuki Fujisawa	1	1	0	2	0	4	X	X	8
(Ontario) Grace Lloyd 🔨	0	0	0	0	1	0	X	X	1

==== Draw 14 ====
Friday, November 6, 11:00 am

Sheet C	1	2	3	4	5	6	7	8	Final
(Sweden) Anna Hasselborg	0	2	0	1	0	2	0	1	6
(Alberta) Selena Sturmay 🔨	2	0	1	0	2	0	2	0	7

Sheet D	1	2	3	4	5	6	7	8	Final
(Switzerland) Alina Pätz 🔨	2	1	0	1	0	1	2	1	8
(Japan) Ikue Kitazawa	0	0	2	0	4	0	0	0	6

==== Draw 15 ====
Friday, November 6, 3:00 pm

Sheet A	1	2	3	4	5	6	7	8	9	Final
(Manitoba) Kerri Einarson	0	2	1	0	1	0	0	2	0	6
(Alberta) Serena Gray-Withers 🔨	1	0	0	1	0	3	1	0	1	7

==== Draw 16 ====
Friday, November 6, 7:00 pm

Sheet A	1	2	3	4	5	6	7	8	Final
(Switzerland) Xenia Schwaller 🔨	1	0	2	1	0	1	0	1	6
(British Columbia) Taylor Reese-Hansen	0	3	0	0	1	0	1	0	5

Sheet C	1	2	3	4	5	6	7	8	9	Final
(Ontario) Rachel Homan	1	1	1	0	0	2	0	0	1	6
(Sweden) Isabella Wranå 🔨	0	0	0	2	1	0	0	2	0	5

=== Tiebreaker ===
Saturday, November 7, 8:00 am

Sheet D	1	2	3	4	5	6	7	8	Final
(Japan) Miku Nihira	1	0	3	0	0	2	0	2	8
(British Columbia) Taylor Reese-Hansen 🔨	0	2	0	1	1	0	1	0	5

=== Playoffs ===
Quarterfinals
1	(South Korea) Gim Eun-ji	5
8	(Japan) Miku Nihira	7
4	(Alberta) Selena Sturmay	7
5	(Ontario) Rachel Homan	5
2	(Japan) Ikue Kitazawa	6
7	(Switzerland) Alina Pätz	2
3	(Switzerland) Xenia Schwaller	4
6	(Sweden) Isabella Wranå	7

Semifinals
8	(Japan) Miku Nihira	6
4	(Alberta) Selena Sturmay	4
2	(Japan) Ikue Kitazawa	6
6	(Sweden) Isabella Wranå	7

Final
8	(Japan) Miku Nihira	2
6	(Sweden) Isabella Wranå	11

==== Quarterfinals ====
Saturday, November 7, 3:00 pm

Sheet A	1	2	3	4	5	6	7	8	Final
(Japan) Ikue Kitazawa 🔨	1	2	0	2	1	0	X	X	6
(Switzerland) Alina Pätz	0	0	1	0	0	1	X	X	2

Sheet B	1	2	3	4	5	6	7	8	Final
(Alberta) Selena Sturmay	2	0	2	1	0	0	0	2	7
(Ontario) Rachel Homan 🔨	0	1	0	0	1	2	1	0	5

Sheet C	1	2	3	4	5	6	7	8	Final
(South Korea) Gim Eun-ji 🔨	1	0	1	0	2	0	1	0	5
(Japan) Miku Nihira	0	4	0	1	0	1	0	1	7

Sheet D	1	2	3	4	5	6	7	8	Final
(Switzerland) Xenia Schwaller 🔨	1	0	2	0	0	1	0	0	4
(Sweden) Isabella Wranå	0	2	0	1	0	0	3	1	7

==== Semifinals ====
Saturday, November 7, 7:00 pm

Sheet A	1	2	3	4	5	6	7	8	Final
(Japan) Ikue Kitazawa 🔨	1	1	0	0	1	0	3	0	6
(Sweden) Isabella Wranå	0	0	1	1	0	4	0	1	7

Sheet D	1	2	3	4	5	6	7	8	Final
(Japan) Miku Nihira	0	1	0	3	0	1	0	1	6
(Alberta) Selena Sturmay 🔨	1	0	1	0	1	0	1	0	4

==== Final ====
Sunday, November 8, 3:00 pm

Sheet C	1	2	3	4	5	6	7	8	Final
(Japan) Miku Nihira	0	1	0	0	1	0	X	X	2
(Sweden) Isabella Wranå 🔨	3	0	3	1	0	4	X	X	11
