= 2026 Players' Championship (January) =

Grand Slam of Curling event

2026 Crown Royal Players' Championship
- Host city: Steinbach, Manitoba
- Arena: Southeast Event Centre
- Dates: January 6–11
- Men's winner: (Scotland) Team Whyte
- Curling club: The Peak (Stirling), Stirling
- Skip: Ross Whyte
- Third: Robin Brydone
- Second: Craig Waddell
- Lead: Euan Kyle
- Coach: Alistair Scott
- Finalist: (Scotland) Kyle Waddell
- Women's winner: (Switzerland) Team Tirinzoni
- Curling club: CC Aarau, Aarau
- Skip: Silvana Tirinzoni
- Fourth: Alina Pätz
- Second: Carole Howald
- Lead: Selina Witschonke
- Coach: Pierre Charette
- Finalist: (Manitoba) Kerri Einarson

The 2026 Crown Royal Players' Championship was held from January 6 to 11 at the Southeast Event Centre in Steinbach, Manitoba. It was the fifth and final Grand Slam event of the 2025–26 curling season.

In a change of timing from previous seasons, the Players' Championship was moved from April to January to close out the Grand Slam season ahead of the 2026 Winter Olympics. The Mattamy Athletic Centre in Toronto, which usually hosts the event, will instead host the inaugural season of the Rock League April 6–12.

== Qualification ==
The top 12 ranked men's and women's teams on World Curling's Year-to-Date rankings as of December 15, 2025, qualified for the event. In the event that a team declines their invitation, the next-ranked team on the world team ranking is invited until the field is complete.

=== Men ===
Top Year-to-Date men's teams:

1. (Scotland) Bruce Mouat
2. (Manitoba) Matt Dunstone
3. (Alberta) Brad Jacobs
4. (Switzerland) Yannick Schwaller
5. (United States) Daniel Casper
6. (Italy) Joël Retornaz
7. (Ontario) ~~John Epping~~
8. (Scotland) Ross Whyte
9. (Sweden) Niklas Edin
10. (United States) John Shuster
11. (Scotland) Kyle Waddell
12. (Alberta) ~~Evan van Amsterdam~~
13. (Saskatchewan) Mike McEwen
14. (China) Xu Xiaoming

=== Women ===
Top Year-to-Date women's teams:

1. (Ontario) Rachel Homan
2. (Switzerland) Silvana Tirinzoni
3. (South Korea) Gim Eun-ji
4. (Switzerland) Xenia Schwaller
5. (South Korea) ~~Ha Seung-youn~~
6. (Sweden) Anna Hasselborg
7. (Japan) Sayaka Yoshimura
8. (Japan) Momoha Tabata
9. (South Korea) ~~Kang Bo-bae~~
10. (United States) Tabitha Peterson
11. (Japan) Satsuki Fujisawa
12. (Manitoba) Kerri Einarson
13. (Japan) Ikue Kitazawa
14. (Scotland) ~~Rebecca Morrison~~
15. (Sweden) Isabella Wranå

== Men ==
=== Teams ===
The teams are listed as follows:

Skip	Third	Second	Lead	Alternate	Locale
Daniel Casper	Luc Violette	Ben Richardson	Aidan Oldenburg	Rich Ruohonen	(United States) Chaska, Minnesota
Matt Dunstone	Colton Lott	E. J. Harnden	Ryan Harnden		Winnipeg, Manitoba
Niklas Edin	Oskar Eriksson	Rasmus Wranå	Christoffer Sundgren		Karlstad, Sweden
Brad Jacobs	Marc Kennedy	Brett Gallant	Ben Hebert		Calgary, Alberta
Mike McEwen	Colton Flasch	B. J. Neufeld (Note: B. J. Neufeld spared for Kevin Marsh who was on paternity leave.)	Dan Marsh		Saskatoon, Saskatchewan
Bruce Mouat	Grant Hardie	Bobby Lammie	Hammy McMillan Jr.		Edinburgh, Scotland
Joël Retornaz	Amos Mosaner	Sebastiano Arman	Mattia Giovanella		Trentino, Italy
Benoît Schwarz-van Berkel (Fourth)	Yannick Schwaller (Skip)	Sven Michel	Pablo Lachat-Couchepin		Geneva, Switzerland
John Shuster	Chris Plys	Colin Hufman	Matt Hamilton		(United States) Duluth, Minnesota
Kyle Waddell	Mark Watt	Angus Bryce	Blair Haswell		Hamilton, Scotland
Ross Whyte	Robin Brydone	Craig Waddell (Note: Alternate Craig Waddell spared for Duncan McFadzean.)	Euan Kyle		Stirling, Scotland
Xu Xiaoming	Fei Xueqing	Li Zhichao	Xu Jingtao	Wang Zhenhao	Beijing, China

=== Round robin standings ===
Final Round Robin Standings

Key
Teams to Playoffs
Teams to Tiebreaker

Pool A	W	SOW	SOL	L	PF	PA	Pts	LSD
(Switzerland) Yannick Schwaller	3	1	1	0	39	25	12	59.4
(China) Xu Xiaoming	3	1	0	1	34	29	11	239.3
(United States) John Shuster	3	0	0	2	26	26	9	34.1
(Scotland) Bruce Mouat	2	1	1	1	30	23	9	97.9
(United States) Daniel Casper	1	0	1	3	21	33	4	88.6
(Sweden) Niklas Edin	0	0	0	5	25	39	0	174.1

Pool B	W	SOW	SOL	L	PF	PA	Pts	LSD
(Scotland) Kyle Waddell	3	2	0	0	40	23	13	28.1
(Scotland) Ross Whyte	3	0	2	0	32	26	11	80.6
(Italy) Joël Retornaz	2	1	1	1	31	29	9	11.9
(Manitoba) Matt Dunstone	1	2	0	2	32	34	7	43
(Alberta) Brad Jacobs	1	0	1	3	24	31	4	55.7
(Saskatchewan) Mike McEwen	0	0	1	4	18	34	1	38.4

=== Round robin results ===
All draw times are listed in Eastern Time (UTC−04:00).

==== Draw 1 ====
Tuesday, January 6, 11:30 am

Sheet A	1	2	3	4	5	6	7	8	9	Final
(Italy) Joël Retornaz 🔨	2	0	0	2	1	0	2	0	0	7
(Scotland) Kyle Waddell	0	2	2	0	0	1	0	2	1	8

Sheet B	1	2	3	4	5	6	7	8	Final
(United States) Daniel Casper	0	2	0	1	0	0	0	X	3
(China) Xu Xiaoming 🔨	3	0	1	0	2	1	1	X	8

==== Draw 2 ====
Tuesday, January 6, 3:00 pm

Sheet A	1	2	3	4	5	6	7	8	Final
(Alberta) Brad Jacobs	0	0	1	0	1	0	1	X	3
(Scotland) Ross Whyte 🔨	2	0	0	2	0	2	0	X	6

Sheet B	1	2	3	4	5	6	7	8	Final
(Switzerland) Yannick Schwaller	0	0	4	0	3	0	3	X	10
(Sweden) Niklas Edin 🔨	1	1	0	2	0	1	0	X	5

==== Draw 3 ====
Tuesday, January 6, 6:30 pm

Sheet A	1	2	3	4	5	6	7	8	9	Final
(Manitoba) Matt Dunstone	0	0	0	2	0	2	0	1	1	6
(Saskatchewan) Mike McEwen 🔨	0	1	1	0	1	0	2	0	0	5

Sheet B	1	2	3	4	5	6	7	8	Final
(Scotland) Bruce Mouat 🔨	1	1	1	0	0	1	1	X	5
(United States) John Shuster	0	0	0	1	0	0	0	X	1

==== Draw 4 ====
Wednesday, January 7, 8:30 am

Sheet A	1	2	3	4	5	6	7	8	Final
(Switzerland) Yannick Schwaller	0	3	0	1	0	2	2	X	8
(United States) Daniel Casper 🔨	2	0	0	0	1	0	0	X	3

Sheet B	1	2	3	4	5	6	7	8	Final
(Alberta) Brad Jacobs	0	2	0	0	1	0	0	1	4
(Italy) Joël Retornaz 🔨	2	0	1	0	0	1	1	0	5

==== Draw 5 ====
Wednesday, January 7, 12:00 pm

Sheet A	1	2	3	4	5	6	7	8	Final
(Scotland) Bruce Mouat	0	2	0	2	1	0	3	X	8
(Sweden) Niklas Edin 🔨	1	0	1	0	0	2	0	X	4

Sheet B	1	2	3	4	5	6	7	8	Final
(Scotland) Ross Whyte	0	0	2	1	0	2	1	X	6
(Saskatchewan) Mike McEwen 🔨	0	2	0	0	1	0	0	X	3

==== Draw 6 ====
Wednesday, January 7, 4:00 pm

Sheet A	1	2	3	4	5	6	7	8	Final
(United States) John Shuster	0	0	2	0	2	0	2	1	7
(China) Xu Xiaoming 🔨	1	0	0	1	0	2	0	0	4

Sheet B	1	2	3	4	5	6	7	8	Final
(Manitoba) Matt Dunstone 🔨	1	0	1	0	2	0	X	X	4
(Scotland) Kyle Waddell	0	3	0	5	0	1	X	X	9

==== Draw 7 ====
Wednesday, January 7, 8:00 pm

Sheet C	1	2	3	4	5	6	7	8	9	Final
(Scotland) Bruce Mouat	0	2	0	1	0	1	0	2	1	7
(United States) Daniel Casper 🔨	1	0	2	0	2	0	1	0	0	6

Sheet D	1	2	3	4	5	6	7	8	Final
(Italy) Joël Retornaz 🔨	1	1	0	2	0	1	1	X	6
(Saskatchewan) Mike McEwen	0	0	1	0	1	0	0	X	2

==== Draw 8 ====
Thursday, January 8, 8:30 am

Sheet C	1	2	3	4	5	6	7	8	9	Final
(Switzerland) Yannick Schwaller 🔨	1	0	2	0	1	0	3	0	0	7
(China) Xu Xiaoming	0	2	0	1	0	2	0	2	1	8

Sheet D	1	2	3	4	5	6	7	8	Final
(Alberta) Brad Jacobs	0	1	0	1	0	0	2	0	4
(Scotland) Kyle Waddell 🔨	1	0	2	0	0	2	0	2	7

==== Draw 9 ====
Thursday, January 8, 12:00 pm

Sheet C	1	2	3	4	5	6	7	8	9	Final
(Italy) Joël Retornaz 🔨	1	0	2	0	1	0	2	0	1	7
(Scotland) Ross Whyte	0	2	0	1	0	1	0	2	0	6

Sheet D	1	2	3	4	5	6	7	8	Final
(United States) Daniel Casper 🔨	2	0	2	0	0	2	0	X	6
(Sweden) Niklas Edin	0	1	0	1	0	0	1	X	3

==== Draw 10 ====
Thursday, January 8, 4:00 pm

Sheet C	1	2	3	4	5	6	7	8	Final
(Scotland) Kyle Waddell 🔨	4	0	2	0	3	X	X	X	9
(Saskatchewan) Mike McEwen	0	1	0	1	0	X	X	X	2

Sheet D	1	2	3	4	5	6	7	8	Final
(Scotland) Bruce Mouat 🔨	2	0	0	1	0	1	1	0	5
(China) Xu Xiaoming	0	2	1	0	1	0	0	2	6

==== Draw 11 ====
Thursday, January 8, 8:00 pm

Sheet C	1	2	3	4	5	6	7	8	9	Final
(Manitoba) Matt Dunstone 🔨	0	2	0	0	0	2	0	2	1	7
(Alberta) Brad Jacobs	1	0	1	1	1	0	2	0	0	6

Sheet D	1	2	3	4	5	6	7	8	Final
(Switzerland) Yannick Schwaller 🔨	0	1	4	0	3	0	X	X	8
(United States) John Shuster	1	0	0	2	0	1	X	X	4

==== Draw 12 ====
Friday, January 9, 8:30 am

Sheet A	1	2	3	4	5	6	7	8	Final
(Sweden) Niklas Edin	0	0	2	2	0	0	3	0	7
(China) Xu Xiaoming 🔨	2	3	0	0	1	1	0	1	8

Sheet B	1	2	3	4	5	6	7	8	9	Final
(Scotland) Ross Whyte 🔨	1	0	1	0	1	0	3	0	0	6
(Scotland) Kyle Waddell	0	1	0	1	0	2	0	2	1	7

==== Draw 13 ====
Friday, January 9, 12:00 pm

Sheet C	1	2	3	4	5	6	7	8	Final
(United States) Daniel Casper	0	2	0	0	0	1	0	X	3
(United States) John Shuster 🔨	3	0	1	0	1	0	2	X	7

Sheet D	1	2	3	4	5	6	7	8	Final
(Manitoba) Matt Dunstone 🔨	1	0	2	0	3	1	0	2	9
(Italy) Joël Retornaz	0	2	0	2	0	0	2	0	6

==== Draw 14 ====
Friday, January 9, 4:00 pm

Sheet C	1	2	3	4	5	6	7	8	9	Final
(Scotland) Bruce Mouat 🔨	1	0	1	1	0	0	2	0	0	5
(Switzerland) Yannick Schwaller	0	2	0	0	0	2	0	1	1	6

Sheet D	1	2	3	4	5	6	7	8	Final
(Alberta) Brad Jacobs 🔨	2	0	2	0	2	0	0	1	7
(Saskatchewan) Mike McEwen	0	2	0	2	0	1	1	0	6

==== Draw 15 ====
Friday, January 9, 8:00 pm

Sheet A	1	2	3	4	5	6	7	8	Final
(Manitoba) Matt Dunstone 🔨	1	0	2	0	1	0	2	0	6
(Scotland) Ross Whyte	0	2	0	2	0	3	0	1	8

Sheet B	1	2	3	4	5	6	7	8	Final
(United States) John Shuster	0	1	0	2	0	2	0	2	7
(Sweden) Niklas Edin 🔨	2	0	1	0	1	0	2	0	6

=== Tiebreaker ===
Saturday, January 10, 10:30 am

Sheet C	1	2	3	4	5	6	7	8	Final
(United States) John Shuster 🔨	1	0	3	0	2	0	2	X	8
(Scotland) Bruce Mouat	0	1	0	4	0	1	0	X	6

=== Playoffs ===
Quarterfinals
4	(China) Xu Xiaoming	7
5	(Italy) Joël Retornaz	5
3	(Scotland) Ross Whyte	6
6	(United States) John Shuster	4

Semifinals
1	(Scotland) Kyle Waddell	5
4	(China) Xu Xiaoming	4
2	(Switzerland) Yannick Schwaller	4
3	(Scotland) Ross Whyte	5

Final
1	(Scotland) Kyle Waddell	3
3	(Scotland) Ross Whyte	6

==== Quarterfinals ====
Saturday, January 10, 2:30 pm

Sheet A	1	2	3	4	5	6	7	8	Final
(Scotland) Ross Whyte 🔨	2	0	1	0	2	0	0	1	6
(United States) John Shuster	0	1	0	2	0	1	0	0	4

Sheet C	1	2	3	4	5	6	7	8	Final
(China) Xu Xiaoming 🔨	2	0	2	0	1	0	2	X	7
(Italy) Joël Retornaz	0	2	0	1	0	2	0	X	5

==== Semifinals ====
Saturday, January 10, 6:30 pm

Sheet A	1	2	3	4	5	6	7	8	Final
(Scotland) Kyle Waddell 🔨	2	0	1	0	0	1	0	1	5
(China) Xu Xiaoming	0	1	0	1	0	0	2	0	4

Sheet C	1	2	3	4	5	6	7	8	Final
(Switzerland) Yannick Schwaller 🔨	1	0	1	1	0	0	1	0	4
(Scotland) Ross Whyte	0	1	0	0	1	2	0	1	5

==== Final ====
Sunday, January 11, 11:00 am

Sheet C	1	2	3	4	5	6	7	8	Final
(Scotland) Kyle Waddell 🔨	0	1	0	0	2	0	0	X	3
(Scotland) Ross Whyte	1	0	2	1	0	2	0	X	6

== Women ==
=== Teams ===
The teams are listed as follows:

Skip	Third	Second	Lead	Alternate	Locale
Kerri Einarson	Val Sweeting	Shannon Birchard	Karlee Burgess	Krysten Karwacki	Gimli, Manitoba
Satsuki Fujisawa	Chinami Yoshida	Yumi Suzuki	Yurika Yoshida		Kitami, Japan
Gim Eun-ji	Kim Min-ji	Kim Su-ji	Seol Ye-eun	Seol Ye-ji	Uijeongbu, South Korea
Anna Hasselborg	Sara McManus	Agnes Knochenhauer	Sofia Scharback	Johanna Heldin	Sundbyberg, Sweden
Rachel Homan	Tracy Fleury	Emma Miskew	Sarah Wilkes		Ottawa, Ontario
Ikue Kitazawa	Seina Nakajima	Minori Suzuki	Hasumi Ishigooka		Nagano, Japan
Tabitha Peterson	Cory Thiesse	Tara Peterson	Taylor Anderson-Heide	Aileen Geving	(United States) Chaska, Minnesota
Xenia Schwaller	Selina Gafner	Fabienne Rieder	Selina Rychiger		Zurich, Switzerland
Miku Nihira (Note: Miku Nihira skipped Team Tabata.)	Momoha Tabata	Sae Yamamoto	Mikoto Nakajima		Sapporo, Japan
Alina Pätz (Fourth)	Silvana Tirinzoni (Skip)	Carole Howald	Selina Witschonke		Aarau, Switzerland
Isabella Wranå	Almida de Val	Maria Larsson	Linda Stenlund		Sundbyberg, Sweden
Sayaka Yoshimura	Kaho Onodera	Yuna Kotani	Anna Ohmiya	Mina Kobayashi	Sapporo, Japan

=== Round robin standings ===
Final Round Robin Standings

Key
Teams to Playoffs
Teams to Tiebreaker

Pool A	W	SOW	SOL	L	PF	PA	Pts	LSD
(Ontario) Rachel Homan	3	0	0	2	29	22	9	71.1
(United States) Tabitha Peterson	2	1	1	1	26	28	9	213.2
(Sweden) Isabella Wranå	2	1	0	2	29	24	8	132.5
(Japan) Satsuki Fujisawa	2	1	0	2	24	26	8	266.4
(Sweden) Anna Hasselborg	1	1	1	2	28	31	6	42.7
(Switzerland) Xenia Schwaller	1	0	2	2	25	30	5	88.9

Pool B	W	SOW	SOL	L	PF	PA	Pts	LSD
(Switzerland) Silvana Tirinzoni	3	1	0	1	36	28	11	116.3
(Manitoba) Kerri Einarson	3	0	0	2	28	36	9	82.5
(South Korea) Gim Eun-ji	3	0	0	2	35	24	9	85.5
(Japan) Ikue Kitazawa	2	0	0	3	25	31	6	83.5
(Japan) Sayaka Yoshimura	2	0	0	3	29	29	6	93.1
(Japan) Team Tabata	1	0	1	3	26	31	4	213

=== Round robin results ===
All draw times are listed in Eastern Time (UTC−04:00).

==== Draw 1 ====
Tuesday, January 6, 11:30 am

Sheet C	1	2	3	4	5	6	7	8	Final
(Japan) Sayaka Yoshimura 🔨	1	0	2	0	0	0	1	0	4
(Japan) Ikue Kitazawa	0	1	0	1	0	2	0	1	5

Sheet D	1	2	3	4	5	6	7	8	Final
(Sweden) Anna Hasselborg	1	1	0	1	3	0	1	X	7
(Japan) Satsuki Fujisawa 🔨	0	0	1	0	0	2	0	X	3

==== Draw 2 ====
Tuesday, January 6, 3:00 pm

Sheet C	1	2	3	4	5	6	7	8	Final
(South Korea) Gim Eun-ji 🔨	0	2	0	3	0	3	0	4	12
(Manitoba) Kerri Einarson	0	0	2	0	2	0	3	0	7

Sheet D	1	2	3	4	5	6	7	8	9	Final
(Switzerland) Xenia Schwaller 🔨	1	1	0	2	1	1	0	0	0	6
(United States) Tabitha Peterson	0	0	1	0	0	0	3	2	1	7

==== Draw 3 ====
Tuesday, January 6, 6:30 pm

Sheet C	1	2	3	4	5	6	7	8	9	Final
(Switzerland) Silvana Tirinzoni 🔨	1	0	0	1	0	1	1	0	1	5
(Japan) Team Tabata	0	0	1	0	2	0	0	1	0	4

Sheet D	1	2	3	4	5	6	7	8	Final
(Ontario) Rachel Homan 🔨	1	0	2	0	1	0	1	0	5
(Sweden) Isabella Wranå	0	1	0	1	0	1	0	1	4

==== Draw 4 ====
Wednesday, January 7, 8:30 am

Sheet C	1	2	3	4	5	6	7	8	9	Final
(Switzerland) Xenia Schwaller	0	0	1	0	0	1	0	3	0	5
(Sweden) Anna Hasselborg 🔨	0	2	0	1	0	0	2	0	1	6

Sheet D	1	2	3	4	5	6	7	8	Final
(South Korea) Gim Eun-ji 🔨	3	2	0	3	0	4	X	X	12
(Japan) Sayaka Yoshimura	0	0	1	0	3	0	X	X	4

==== Draw 5 ====
Wednesday, January 7, 12:00 pm

Sheet C	1	2	3	4	5	6	7	8	Final
(United States) Tabitha Peterson	0	1	0	1	0	1	1	1	5
(Sweden) Isabella Wranå 🔨	1	0	2	0	1	0	0	0	4

Sheet D	1	2	3	4	5	6	7	8	Final
(Japan) Team Tabata 🔨	2	0	3	0	0	1	1	0	7
(Manitoba) Kerri Einarson	0	2	0	3	1	0	0	2	8

==== Draw 6 ====
Wednesday, January 7, 4:00 pm

Sheet C	1	2	3	4	5	6	7	8	Final
(Ontario) Rachel Homan 🔨	1	0	1	0	1	0	1	0	4
(Japan) Satsuki Fujisawa	0	2	0	1	0	2	0	0	5

Sheet D	1	2	3	4	5	6	7	8	Final
(Switzerland) Silvana Tirinzoni	0	1	1	0	2	0	2	2	8
(Japan) Ikue Kitazawa 🔨	2	0	0	2	0	1	0	0	5

==== Draw 7 ====
Wednesday, January 7, 8:00 pm

Sheet A	1	2	3	4	5	6	7	8	Final
(Japan) Sayaka Yoshimura 🔨	1	0	2	0	2	0	2	X	7
(Japan) Team Tabata	0	1	0	1	0	1	0	X	3

Sheet B	1	2	3	4	5	6	7	8	9	Final
(Sweden) Anna Hasselborg 🔨	1	0	2	0	0	1	0	1	0	5
(Sweden) Isabella Wranå	0	1	0	2	1	0	1	0	1	6

==== Draw 8 ====
Thursday, January 8, 8:30 am

Sheet A	1	2	3	4	5	6	7	8	Final
(South Korea) Gim Eun-ji	0	2	0	2	0	2	0	1	7
(Japan) Ikue Kitazawa 🔨	1	0	1	0	1	0	2	0	5

Sheet B	1	2	3	4	5	6	7	8	Final
(Switzerland) Xenia Schwaller 🔨	0	2	0	1	0	1	0	0	4
(Japan) Satsuki Fujisawa	1	0	1	0	2	0	0	2	6

==== Draw 9 ====
Thursday, January 8, 12:00 pm

Sheet A	1	2	3	4	5	6	7	8	Final
(Sweden) Anna Hasselborg	0	2	0	2	0	1	0	X	5
(United States) Tabitha Peterson 🔨	2	0	2	0	3	0	1	X	8

Sheet B	1	2	3	4	5	6	7	8	Final
(Japan) Sayaka Yoshimura	1	2	4	0	1	2	X	X	10
(Manitoba) Kerri Einarson 🔨	0	0	0	2	0	0	X	X	2

==== Draw 10 ====
Thursday, January 8, 4:00 pm

Sheet A	1	2	3	4	5	6	7	8	Final
(Japan) Satsuki Fujisawa	0	0	1	0	2	1	0	1	5
(Sweden) Isabella Wranå 🔨	2	1	0	1	0	0	3	0	7

Sheet B	1	2	3	4	5	6	7	8	Final
(Japan) Team Tabata	0	1	0	2	0	1	1	1	6
(Japan) Ikue Kitazawa 🔨	1	0	3	0	3	0	0	0	7

==== Draw 11 ====
Thursday, January 8, 8:00 pm

Sheet A	1	2	3	4	5	6	7	8	Final
(Ontario) Rachel Homan	0	1	0	0	1	0	1	0	3
(Switzerland) Xenia Schwaller 🔨	1	0	0	2	0	1	0	2	6

Sheet B	1	2	3	4	5	6	7	8	Final
(Switzerland) Silvana Tirinzoni	0	0	2	0	2	0	2	2	8
(South Korea) Gim Eun-ji 🔨	0	1	0	1	0	2	0	0	4

==== Draw 12 ====
Friday, January 9, 8:30 am

Sheet C	1	2	3	4	5	6	7	8	9	Final
(United States) Tabitha Peterson 🔨	0	0	1	1	0	1	0	1	0	4
(Japan) Satsuki Fujisawa	1	1	0	0	1	0	1	0	1	5

Sheet D	1	2	3	4	5	6	7	8	Final
(Manitoba) Kerri Einarson	2	0	1	2	1	0	0	X	6
(Japan) Ikue Kitazawa 🔨	0	1	0	0	0	2	0	X	3

==== Draw 13 ====
Friday, January 9, 12:00 pm

Sheet A	1	2	3	4	5	6	7	8	Final
(Switzerland) Silvana Tirinzoni 🔨	1	1	0	2	0	1	0	1	6
(Japan) Sayaka Yoshimura	0	0	1	0	2	0	1	0	4

Sheet B	1	2	3	4	5	6	7	8	Final
(Ontario) Rachel Homan	0	2	0	1	0	3	1	2	9
(Sweden) Anna Hasselborg 🔨	2	0	2	0	1	0	0	0	5

==== Draw 14 ====
Friday, January 9, 4:00 pm

Sheet A	1	2	3	4	5	6	7	8	Final
(South Korea) Gim Eun-ji	0	1	0	2	0	1	0	X	4
(Japan) Team Tabata 🔨	2	0	1	0	2	0	1	X	6

Sheet B	1	2	3	4	5	6	7	8	Final
(Switzerland) Xenia Schwaller 🔨	2	0	1	0	0	1	0	0	5
(Sweden) Isabella Wranå	0	3	0	1	0	0	1	3	8

==== Draw 15 ====
Friday, January 9, 8:00 pm

Sheet C	1	2	3	4	5	6	7	8	Final
(Ontario) Rachel Homan 🔨	4	1	0	1	0	1	1	X	8
(United States) Tabitha Peterson	0	0	1	0	1	0	0	X	2

Sheet D	1	2	3	4	5	6	7	8	Final
(Switzerland) Silvana Tirinzoni	0	0	0	1	0	2	1	0	4
(Manitoba) Kerri Einarson 🔨	0	1	2	0	1	0	0	1	5

=== Tiebreaker ===
Saturday, January 10, 10:30 am

Sheet A	1	2	3	4	5	6	7	8	Final
(Sweden) Isabella Wranå	0	2	2	4	1	X	X	X	9
(Japan) Satsuki Fujisawa 🔨	1	0	0	0	0	X	X	X	1

=== Playoffs ===
Quarterfinals
4	(South Korea) Gim Eun-ji	6
5	(United States) Tabitha Peterson	4
3	(Manitoba) Kerri Einarson	8
6	(Sweden) Isabella Wranå	7

Semifinals
1	(Switzerland) Silvana Tirinzoni	7
4	(South Korea) Gim Eun-ji	4
2	(Ontario) Rachel Homan	6
3	(Manitoba) Kerri Einarson	7

Final
1	(Switzerland) Silvana Tirinzoni	6
3	(Manitoba) Kerri Einarson	5

==== Quarterfinals ====
Saturday, January 10, 2:30 pm

Sheet B	1	2	3	4	5	6	7	8	9	Final
(Manitoba) Kerri Einarson 🔨	2	0	0	2	0	2	0	1	1	8
(Sweden) Isabella Wranå	0	2	1	0	2	0	2	0	0	7

Sheet D	1	2	3	4	5	6	7	8	Final
(South Korea) Gim Eun-ji 🔨	0	2	0	2	0	1	0	1	6
(United States) Tabitha Peterson	0	0	1	0	1	0	2	0	4

==== Semifinals ====
Saturday, January 10, 6:30 pm

Sheet B	1	2	3	4	5	6	7	8	Final
(Switzerland) Silvana Tirinzoni 🔨	0	1	0	1	1	2	0	2	7
(South Korea) Gim Eun-ji	1	0	2	0	0	0	1	0	4

Sheet D	1	2	3	4	5	6	7	8	9	Final
(Ontario) Rachel Homan	0	1	0	1	0	2	0	2	0	6
(Manitoba) Kerri Einarson 🔨	1	0	2	0	1	0	2	0	1	7

==== Final ====
Sunday, January 11, 3:30 pm

Sheet C	1	2	3	4	5	6	7	8	Final
(Switzerland) Silvana Tirinzoni 🔨	2	1	0	2	0	1	0	0	6
(Manitoba) Kerri Einarson	0	0	2	0	2	0	0	1	5
