= Ben Richardson (curler) =

American curler (born 1998)

- Curler
- Born: October 9, 1998 (age 28); Miami, Florida, U.S.

Team
- Curling club: Chaska CC, Chaska, MN
- Skip: Daniel Casper
- Third: Luc Violette
- Second: Ben Richardson
- Lead: Aidan Oldenburg

Curling career
- Member Association: United States
- Olympic: 1 (2026)
- Other appearances: Winter Youth Olympics: 1 (2016); World University Games: 1 (2023)
Medal record
Men's curling
Representing United States
Winter Youth Olympics
Silver medal – second place	2016 Lillehammer
World Junior Championships
Silver medal – second place	2017 Gangneung
Winter Universiade
Silver medal – second place	2023 Saranac Lake
Representing Minnesota
US Olympic Trials
Gold medal – first place	2025 Sioux Falls
United States National Championships
Silver medal – second place	2023 Denver
Silver medal – second place	2025 Duluth
Bronze medal – third place	2021 Wausau
Bronze medal – third place	2024 East Rutherford
United States Mixed Doubles Championship
Bronze medal – third place	2021 Wausau

Benjamin Richardson (born October 9, 1998) is an American curler from Miami, Florida. He is a four-time United States Junior Champion, and was a silver medalist at both the 2016 Winter Youth Olympics and the 2017 World Junior Championships. He is currently the second on Team Daniel Casper, and represented the United States at the 2026 Winter Olympics.

== Curling career ==
=== Juniors ===
Richardson, at the time living in Issaquah, Washington, made his first international appearance at the 2014 U18 Optimist International Curling Championship, representing Washington State on Team Nicholas Connolly, where they would win bronze, beating Nova Scotia 5–4 in the bronze medal game.

During the 2015–16 season, Richardson was named to be the second of the mixed team representing the United States at the 2016 Winter Youth Olympics, alongside Luc Violette, Cora Farrell, and Cait Flannery. There, they would win the silver medal, losing in the final to Canada's Mary Fay.

For the 2016–17 season, Richardson would join Team Andrew Stopera as the new second, alongside Violette at third, and Graem Fenson at lead. This line-up won the next three United States Junior Championships from 2017 to 2019. Winning Junior Nationals earned them the chance to represent the United States at the World Junior Championships. At the 2017 Worlds, they earned the silver medal when they lost to Lee Ki-jeong's South Korean team in the final. At the 2018 Worlds they made it to the bronze medal match but lost to Team Switzerland. At the Worlds in 2019, their final as Team Stopera, they finished fifth.

Stopera aged out of juniors after the 2018–19 season. The rest of the team decided to stay together and move up one position, with Richardson now being the new third on Team Violette. Their success at the US Junior Championships continued, winning gold for the fourth year in a row. At the 2020 World Championships they finished in seventh place.

=== Men's ===
Once Richardson aged out of juniors after the 2019–20 season, he was selected alongside Luc Violette, Jon Harstad, and Chase Sinnett as the USCA's new men's U-25 national team. The U-25 team program, which stands for under 25 years old, was added in 2020 as a new part of the High Performance Program with the intention of bridging the development gap between juniors and men's curling.

Starting in the 2022–23 season, after Harstad leaving competitive curling, Violette, Richardson, and Sinnnett would add skip Daniel Casper to their new rink. In the team's first event together, they went undefeated to win the Gord Carroll Curling Classic. They also reached the final of their next event, the US Open of Curling, where they lost in an extra end to Korey Dropkin. The team next played in the playdowns for the 2023 Winter World University Games where they won all six of their games to win the event. Back on tour, they had three more playoff appearances, reaching the quarterfinals of the Nufloors Penticton Curling Classic and the finals of both the Curling Stadium Contender Series and the Curl Mesabi Classic. In the new year, the team represented the U.S. on home soil at the 2023 Winter World University Games in Saranac Lake, New York. Through the round robin, Casper led his rink to a 6–3 record, taking the third seed in the playoff bracket. In the semifinals, his rink upset Switzerland's Jan Iseli 6–3 to qualify for the championship game. There, they dropped a 5–1 decision to Great Britain's James Craik, earning the silver medal from the event. Continuing their momentum from the season, Team Casper finished 6–1 through the round robin at the 2023 United States Men's Curling Championship, taking the number one seed in the playoffs. In the 1 vs. 2 game, they faced the reigning US men's champion John Shuster rink where they lost 8–5. This put them in the semifinal where they upset Team Dropkin to advance to the national final. They could not take revenge on Shuster in the final, however, dropping the game 8–3 and settling for the silver medal.

Having had their most successful season to date, Team Casper continued their momentum into the 2023–24 season, finishing runner-up at their first event. A month later, at the US Open of Curling, they defeated Team Dropkin to claim their first tour title of the season. They also won the St. Paul Cash Spiel in October, defeating Rich Ruohonen in the event final. The following week, Team Casper competed in their first Grand Slam of Curling event, which they qualified for with the points they accumulated throughout the past season. Playing in the Tier 2 event of the 2023 Tour Challenge, the team finished 2–2 through the round robin, however, earned a playoff berth with a strong last stone draw total. Qualifying as the eighth seeds, Team Casper upset both Jeong Byeong-jin and Mike McEwen in the quarterfinal and semifinal rounds to advance to the final against Yusuke Morozumi. There, the team shot a high 88%, securing a 6–2 victory over the Japanese and a spot in the 2024 Canadian Open in January. Back on tour, the Casper rink went undefeated at the Curl Mesabi Classic until the final where they were stopped by Tanner Horgan. In the new year, they competed in their first Tier 1 Slam, the 2024 Canadian Open where they finished with a 1–3 record. In their lone win, they beat Kevin Koe's Alberta rink in a 9–8 game. The team ended the season at the 2024 United States Men's Curling Championship where they qualified for the playoffs with a 4–3 record. After defeating Wesley Wendling in the 3 vs. 4 game, they lost to the John Shuster rink 7–5 in the semifinal. At the end of the season, Chase Sinnett and Casper announced they would be parting ways, with Aidan Oldenburg joining as their new lead.

Team Casper would again find their success in the 2025–26 curling season, starting the season by finishing second at the 2025 Trentino Curling World Cup, losing to Yannick Schwaller 7–6 in the final. Casper continued their strong start to the season by winning the Grand Slam of Curling Masters Tier 2 event, beating Kevin Koe 4–2 in the final. Their performance over the past two seasons qualified the team for the 2025 United States Olympic Curling Trials. At the Trials, Team Casper would go 4–2 in the round robin and beat the rink led by 2018 Olympic Champion and 5-time Olympian John Shuster in the best-of-three final series, winning the deciding Game 3 by a score of 7–5 after the two sides split the first two games. This win qualified the Casper rink to represent the United States at the 2025 Olympic Qualification Event. The team would go on to win the Qualification Event, finishing 6–1 after round robin play and beating China's Xu Xiaoming 9–4, qualifying for the 2026 Winter Olympics. At the Olympics, Casper would finish the round robin with a 4–5 record, finishing 5th and narrowly missing the playoffs.

=== Mixed doubles ===
Richardson has also competed in mixed doubles with Taylor Anderson-Heide, notably winning a bronze medal at the 2021 United States Mixed Doubles Curling Championship. Anderson-Heide and Richardson also competed at the 2025 United States Olympic mixed doubles curling trials, where they would qualify for the playoffs after finishing round-robin play with a 5–4 record. However, they would then be eliminated after losing to Madison Bear and Aidan Oldenburg in the 3v4 game.

== Personal life ==
Richardson's parents were musicians in Miami, and his grandmother who was from Canada encouraged him to get into curling. Richardson is also an accomplished cellist and a graduate from the Cleveland Institute of Music.

He is also known on social media as "curlingcelloguy", in which he posts mainly about three of his favorite things: curling, fitness, or playing the cello.

== Teams ==
=== Men's ===
Season	Skip	Third	Second	Lead	Alternate	Coach	Events
2013–14	Nicholas Connolly	Luc Violette	Kyle Lorvick	Ben Richardson	Blake Sweet		2014 U18 Optimist International (bronze)
2014–15	Nicholas Connolly	Kent Suslavich	Kyle Lorvick	Ben Richardson			
2015–16	Nicholas Connolly	Aaron Carlson	Ben Richardson	Jack Frank			
2016–17	Andrew Stopera	Luc Violette	Ben Richardson	Graem Fenson	Nicholas Connolly (WJCC)	Mark Lazar	2017 USJCC (gold); 2017 WJCC (silver)
2017–18	Andrew Stopera	Luc Violette	Ben Richardson	Graem Fenson	Caleb Clawson	Mark Lazar	2018 USJCC (gold); 2018 WJCC (4th)
2018–19	Andrew Stopera	Luc Violette	Ben Richardson	Graem Fenson	Riley Fenson	Mark Lazar	2019 USJCC (gold); 2019 WJCC (5th)
2019–20	Luc Violette	Riley Fenson	Ben Richardson	Graem Fenson	Jon Harstad		2020 USJCC (gold)
2019–20	Luc Violette	Ben Richardson	Jon Harstad	Graem Fenson	Kevin Tuma	Tyler George	2020 WJCC (7th)
2020–21	Luc Violette	Chase Sinnett	Ben Richardson	Jon Harstad		Tyler George; Jordan Moulton	USMCC 2021 (bronze)
2021–22	Luc Violette	Chase Sinnett	Ben Richardson	Jon Harstad			
2022–23	Daniel Casper	Luc Violette	Ben Richardson	Chase Sinnett			USMCC 2023 (silver)
2023–24	Daniel Casper	Luc Violette	Ben Richardson	Chase Sinnett			USMCC 2024 (bronze)
2024–25	Daniel Casper	Luc Violette	Ben Richardson	Aidan Oldenburg	Rich Ruohonen		USMCC 2025 (silver)
2025–26	Daniel Casper	Luc Violette	Ben Richardson	Aidan Oldenburg	Rich Ruohonen		USPCQ 2025 (bronze); USOCT 2025 (gold); OQE 2025 (gold); WOG 2026 (5th)
2026–27	Daniel Casper	Luc Violette	Ben Richardson	Aidan Oldenburg			

=== Mixed ===
Season	Skip	Third	Second	Lead	Alternate	Coach	Events
2015–16	Luc Violette	Cora Farrell	Ben Richardson	Cait Flannery		Tom Violette	2016 WYOG (silver)
