= Aidan Oldenburg =

American curler (born 2001)

- Curler
- Born: June 22, 2001 (age 25); Minnesota, United States

Team
- Curling club: Chaska CC, Chaska, MN
- Skip: Daniel Casper
- Third: Luc Violette
- Second: Ben Richardson
- Lead: Aidan Oldenburg
- Mixed doubles partner: Madison Bear

Curling career
- Member Association: United States
- World Championship: 1 (2026)
- Olympic: 1 (2026)
Medal record
Curling
Representing Minnesota
US Olympic Trials
Gold medal – first place	2025 Sioux Falls
US Mixed Doubles Olympic Trials
Bronze medal – third place	2025 Lafayette
United States National Championships
Silver medal – second place	2025 Duluth
Bronze medal – third place	2024 East Rutherford

Aidan Oldenburg (born June 22, 2001) is an American curler from Mapleton, Minnesota. He is currently the lead on Team Daniel Casper, and represented the United States at the 2026 Winter Olympics. He also notably wears different colored neon headbands while competing on the ice.

== Curling career ==
=== Juniors ===
Oldenburg, in his junior career, would notably skip a team out of St. Paul to a silver medal at the 2021 United States Junior Curling Championships, losing 5–3 in the final to Daniel Casper.

=== Men's ===
Once aging out of Juniors, Oldenburg would join the Daniel Casper rink as their new lead alongside Casper, Luc Violette, and Ben Richardson. Team Casper would begin to find success in the 2025–26 curling season, starting with a second-place finish at the 2025 Trentino Curling World Cup, losing to Yannick Schwaller 7–6 in the final. Casper continued their strong start to the season by winning the Grand Slam of Curling Masters Tier 2 event, beating Kevin Koe 4–2 in the final. Their performance over the past two seasons qualified the team for the 2025 United States Olympic Curling Trials. At the Trials, Team Casper would go 4–2 in the round robin and beat the rink led by 2018 Olympic Champion and 5-time Olympian John Shuster in the best-of-three final series, winning the deciding Game 3 by a score of 7–5 after the two sides split the first two games. This win qualified the Casper rink to represent the United States at the 2025 Olympic Qualification Event. The team would go on to win the Qualification Event, finishing 6–1 after round robin play and beating China's Xu Xiaoming 9–4, qualifying for the 2026 Winter Olympics. At the Olympics, Casper would finish the round robin with a 4–5 record, finishing 5th and narrowly missing the playoffs.

=== Mixed doubles ===
Oldenburg has also competed in mixed doubles with Madison Bear, notably at the 2025 United States Olympic mixed doubles curling trials, where they qualified for the playoffs after finishing round-robin play with a 6–3 record. However, they would lose in the semifinal 7–5 to Sarah Anderson and Andrew Stopera, winning the bronze medal.

== Personal life ==
Oldenburg began curling at age 10. However, he was also well known at the Minnesota State Fair where Oldenburg juggled flaming torches to "We Didn't Start the Fire" in performances with his older brother that included a backflip. He also participated in 4-H as a child.

Outside of curling, Oldenburg works as an environmental scientist on permitting for wind and solar projects nationwide, fulfilling a lifelong dream that, as a child, he would spend hours on projects involving animals and wildlife, especially fish. Oldenburg graduated from Minnesota State University, Mankato with bachelor's degree in ecology in 2022, where he was captain of the Minnesota State Mavericks' varsity Valorant E-Sports team.
