= Thomas Howell (curler) =

American curler (born 1994)

- Curler
- Born: October 14, 1994 (age 32); Newton, Massachusetts, United States

Team
- Curling club: Kettle Moraine CC, Delafield, WI

Curling career
- Member Association: United States
- World Championship: 2 (2022, 2025)
- Pan Continental Championship: 2 (2022, 2023)
- Other appearances: Winter Universiade: 1 (2013), World Junior Championships: 3 (2012, 2013, 2016)
Medal record
Curling
World Junior Curling Championships
Silver medal – second place	2016 Copenhagen
Pan Continental Curling Championships
Bronze medal – third place	2022 Calgary
United States Men's Championship
Gold medal – first place	2021 Wausau
Gold medal – first place	2025 Duluth
Silver medal – second place	2018 Fargo
Silver medal – second place	2024 East Rutherford
Silver medal – second place	2026 Charlotte
Bronze medal – third place	2023 Denver

Thomas "Tom" Howell (born October 14, 1994) is an American curler from Milwaukee.

== Curling career ==
=== Juniors ===
As a junior curler, Howell won three United States Junior Curling Championships, in 2012, 2013, and 2016. As such, he played for the United States at three World Junior Curling Championships, notably finishing 5th at the 2012 World Junior Curling Championships and 7th at the 2013 World Junior Curling Championships.

Howell was a member of the U.S. team at the 2012 Winter Youth Olympics, playing second on a team that included Korey Dropkin, Sarah Anderson, and Taylor Anderson. The team finished 5th at the event; after going undefeated in the round-robin, they were eliminated in the quarter-final against Italy.

Howell also represented the United States at the 2013 Winter Universiade, as the alternate for the Chris Plys's team. That team finished in 5th place.

=== Men's ===
On the World Curling Tour, Howell, as a member of the Dropkin rink, has been a regular at events held in the U.S., playing in his first event at the 2010 Laphroaig Scotch Open at the age of 16. Howell won his first Tour event by winning the 2014 Twin Cities Open.

From 2016-18, Howell and Dropkin joined the Heath McCormick rink, with Plys at third and Dropkin at second. During Howell's second season with Team McCormick, he won his first medal at the United States Men's Championship, earning silver when they lost to Greg Persinger's team in the final.

In 2021, Howell won his first United States Men's Curling Championship, which was postponed until after that year's Worlds due to the COVID-19 pandemic. The following season, he finished runner-up at the 2021 United States Olympic Curling Trials, after losing to the defending Olympic champion John Shuster rink in the final. As the 2022 US nationals were cancelled due to the pandemic, Dropkin's rink was invited to represent the US at the 2022 World Men's Curling Championship, where Howell and the Dropkin rink finished in fourth.

Dropkin and Howell formed a new team in the 2022-23 season, joining former junior teammates Stopera and Fenner. The team had good success, winning a bronze medal at the 2022 Pan Continental Curling Championships, and finishing fourth in 2023. The rink won their first men's national title together at the 2025 United States Men's Curling Championship, representing USA at the 2025 World Men's Curling Championship. At the 2025 Worlds, the team went 4-8 after the round robin, finishing a disappointing 11th place.

== Personal life ==
Howell is married and is employed as a financial advisor.

== Teams ==
=== Men's ===
Season	Skip	Third	Second	Lead	Alternate	Coach	Events
2009–10	Stephen Dropkin	Korey Dropkin	Tom Howell	Ryan McMakin	Cameron Ross		2010 USJCC (4th)
2010–11	Stephen Dropkin	Korey Dropkin	Tom Howell	Derek Corbett	Cameron Ross		2011 USJCC (silver)
2011–12	Stephen Dropkin	Korey Dropkin	Tom Howell	Derek Corbett	Cameron Ross	Sandra McMakin	2012 USJCC (gold); 2012 WJCC (5th)
2012–13	Korey Dropkin	Tom Howell	Mark Fenner	Alex Fenson	Connor Hoge	Keith Dropkin	2013 USJCC (gold); 2013 WJCC (7th)
2013–14	Chris Plys	Stephen Dropkin	Sean Beighton	Korey Dropkin	Tom Howell	Phill Drobnick	2013 WUG (5th)
2013–14	Korey Dropkin	Tom Howell	Mark Fenner	Alex Fenson			2014 USJCC (bronze)
2014–15	Korey Dropkin	Tom Howell	Mark Fenner	Andrew Stopera	Luc Violette		2015 USJCC (silver); 2015 USMCC (6th)
2015–16	Korey Dropkin	Tom Howell	Mark Fenner	Alex Fenson	Quinn Evenson	Wally Henry (WJCC)	2016 USMCC (4th); 2016 USJCC (gold); 2016 WJCC (silver)
2016–17	Heath McCormick	Chris Plys	Korey Dropkin	Tom Howell			2017 USMCC (6th)
2017–18	Heath McCormick	Chris Plys	Korey Dropkin	Tom Howell			2018 USMCC (silver)
2018–19	Korey Dropkin (fourth)	Tom Howell	Mark Fenner (skip)	Alex Fenson			2019 USMCC (4th)
2019–20	Korey Dropkin	Tom Howell	Mark Fenner	Alex Fenson	Joe Polo		2020 USMCC (5th)
2020–21	Korey Dropkin	Joe Polo	Mark Fenner	Tom Howell	Alex Fenson		2021 USMCC (gold)
2021–22	Korey Dropkin	Joe Polo	Mark Fenner	Tom Howell	Alex Fenson	Tim Solin	2021 USOCT (silver); 2022 WCC (4th)
2022–23	Korey Dropkin	Andrew Stopera	Mark Fenner	Tom Howell		Mark Lazar	2022 PCCC (bronze); 2023 USMCC (bronze)
2023–24	Korey Dropkin (Fourth)	Andrew Stopera (Skip)	Mark Fenner	Tom Howell		Mark Lazar	2023 PCCC (4th); 2024 USMCC (silver)
2024–25	Korey Dropkin	Tom Howell	Andrew Stopera	Mark Fenner	Chris Plys (WMCC)	Mark Lazar	2025 USMCC (gold); 2025 WMCC (11th)
2025	Korey Dropkin	Tom Howell	Andrew Stopera	Mark Fenner		Mark Lazar	
2025–26	Andrew Stopera	Tom Howell	Mark Fenner	Lance Wheeler		Mark Lazar	2026 USMCC (silver)

=== Mixed ===
Season	Skip	Third	Second	Lead	Coach	Events
2011–12	Korey Dropkin	Sarah Anderson	Thomas Howell	Taylor Anderson	Wally Henry	2012 WYOG (5th)

=== Mixed doubles ===
Season	Female	Male	Coach	Events
2011–12	(China) Yang Ying	(United States) Thomas Howell	Li Hongchen	2012 WYOG (9th)
