= Daniel Casper =

American curler (born 2001)

- Curler
- Born: June 18, 2001 (age 25); Briarcliff Manor, New York, U.S.

Team
- Curling club: Ardsley CC, Ardsley, NY
- Skip: Daniel Casper
- Third: Luc Violette
- Second: Ben Richardson
- Lead: Aidan Oldenburg

Curling career
- Member Association: United States
- Pan Continental Championship: 1 (2025)
- Olympic: 1 (2026)
- Other appearances: World University Games: 1 (2023)
Medal record
Men's curling
Representing United States
Pan Continental Championships
Silver medal – second place	2025 Virginia
Winter Universiade
Silver medal – second place	2023 Saranac Lake
Representing Minnesota
US Olympic Trials
Gold medal – first place	2025 Sioux Falls
United States Men's Championship
Silver medal – second place	2023 Denver
Silver medal – second place	2025 Duluth
Bronze medal – third place	2024 East Rutherford

Daniel "Danny" Casper (born June 18, 2001, in Briarcliff Manor, New York) is an American curler from Minneapolis, Minnesota. He currently skips his own team out of Chaska. He is a former U.S. junior champion, going on to win the silver medal at the 2023 Winter World University Games.

== Career ==
=== Juniors ===
Casper's first national success came in 2017 with a bronze medal performance at the United States U18 Curling Championships. There, his team, skipped by Chase Sinnett, went undefeated until the semifinals where they lost to Wisconsin's Michael Elwing. They then defeated Minnesota's Riley Fenson to claim third place. The following season, his team, now led by Eli Clawson, again reached the playoffs with an undefeated record before consecutive losses in the semifinals and bronze medal games, finishing fourth. In his final year of U18 eligibility, Casper skipped his own team to a bronze medal performance with a combined 5–2 record through the round robin and playoff rounds.

For the 2019–20 season, Casper continued skipping his own squad with teammates Marius Kleinas, Sam Willertz and Benjamin Grady. At the 2020 United States Junior Curling Championships, the team won three of their first four games before three consecutive losses, ultimately missing the playoffs with a 3–4 record. Then, for the 2020–21 season, Casper and Kleinas remained intact and added Ethan Sampson and Coleman Thurston as front-end players. However, due to the COVID-19 pandemic, the team only played in one event before the cancellation of the rest of their scheduled events.

The following season, the Casper rink added Samuel Strouse to the lineup at second, shifting Sampson to third, Thurston to lead and Kleinas to alternate. This proved to be the right move for the team as they won the U.S. junior title at the start of the season, winning all ten of their games. After an 8–0 round robin record, they beat Wesley Wendling in the semifinals before defeating Aidan Oldenburg in the gold medal game. With the win, the team qualified to represent the United States at the 2022 World Junior Curling Championships. On tour that season, they played in the qualifiers for the 2021 United States Olympic curling trials, however, were unsuccessful in qualifying. At the US Open of Curling contender round, they advanced to the semifinals before being eliminated by Scott Dunnam. They also made the quarterfinals of the DeKalb Superspiel and the Curl Mesabi Classic. In May 2022, they competed in the World Junior Championships. After an opening game win against Canada, the Casper rink suffered four consecutive losses to sit at the bottom of the standings. However, they turned things around with four straight wins to end the week with a 5–4 record, just missing a playoff berth.

=== Men's ===
With no years of junior eligibility left, Casper moved into the men's ranks and began skipping a new team of Luc Violette, Ben Richardson and Chase Sinnett. In the team's first event together, they went undefeated to win the Gord Carroll Curling Classic, marking Casper's first tour event victory. They also reached the final of their next event, the US Open of Curling, where they lost in an extra end to Korey Dropkin. The team next played in the playdowns for the 2023 Winter World University Games where they won all six of their games to win the event. Back on tour, they had three more playoff appearances, reaching the quarterfinals of the Nufloors Penticton Curling Classic and the finals of both the Curling Stadium Contender Series and the Curl Mesabi Classic. In the new year, the team represented the U.S. on home soil at the 2023 Winter World University Games in Saranac Lake, New York. Through the round robin, Casper led his rink to a 6–3 record, taking the third seed in the playoff bracket. In the semifinals, his rink upset Switzerland's Jan Iseli 6–3 to qualify for the championship game. There, they dropped a 5–1 decision to Great Britain's James Craik, earning the silver medal from the event. Continuing their momentum from the season, Team Casper finished 6–1 through the round robin at the 2023 United States Men's Curling Championship, taking the number one seed in the playoffs. In the 1 vs. 2 game, they faced the reigning US men's champion John Shuster rink where they lost 8–5. This put them in the semifinal where they upset Team Dropkin to advance to the national final. They could not take revenge on Shuster in the final, however, dropping the game 8–3 and settling for the silver medal.

Having had their most successful season to date, Team Casper continued their momentum into the 2023–24 season, finishing runner-up at their first event. A month later, at the US Open of Curling, they defeated Team Dropkin to claim their first tour title of the season. They also won the St. Paul Cash Spiel in October, defeating Rich Ruohonen in the event final. The following week, Team Casper competed in their first Grand Slam of Curling event, which they qualified for with the points they accumulated throughout the past season. Playing in the Tier 2 event of the 2023 Tour Challenge, the team finished 2–2 through the round robin, however, earned a playoff berth with a strong last stone draw total. Qualifying as the eighth seeds, Team Casper upset both Jeong Byeong-jin and Mike McEwen in the quarterfinal and semifinal rounds to advance to the final against Yusuke Morozumi. There, the team shot a high 88%, securing a 6–2 victory over the Japanese and a spot in the 2024 Canadian Open in January. Back on tour, the Casper rink went undefeated at the Curl Mesabi Classic until the final where they were stopped by Tanner Horgan. In the new year, they competed in their first Tier 1 Slam, the 2024 Canadian Open where they finished with a 1–3 record. In their lone win, they beat Kevin Koe's Alberta rink in a 9–8 game. The team ended the season at the 2024 United States Men's Curling Championship where they qualified for the playoffs with a 4–3 record. After defeating Wesley Wendling in the 3 vs. 4 game, they lost to the John Shuster rink 7–5 in the semifinal. At the end of the season, Chase Sinnett and Team Casper announced they would be parting ways, with Aidan Oldenburg joining as their new lead.

Team Casper continued their success into the 2025-26 curling season, starting the season by finishing second at the 2025 Trentino Curling World Cup, losing to Yannick Schwaller 7–6 in the final. Casper continued their strong start to the season by winning the Grand Slam of Curling Masters Tier 2 event, beating Kevin Koe 4–2 in the final. Their performance over the past two seasons qualified the team for the 2025 United States Olympic Curling Trials. At the Trials, Team Casper would go 4–2 in the round robin and beat the rink led by 2018 Olympic Champion and 5-time Olympian John Shuster in the best-of-three final series, winning the deciding Game 3 by a score of 7-5 after the two sides split the first two games. This win qualified the Casper rink to represent the United States at the 2025 Olympic Qualification Event. The team would go on to win the Qualification Event, finishing 6–1 after round robin play and beating China's Xu Xiaoming 9–4, qualifying for the 2026 Winter Olympics. At the Olympics, Casper would finish the round robin with a 4–5 record, finishing 5th and narrowly missing the playoffs.

=== Mixed doubles ===
Casper first competed in mixed doubles with Rebecca Rodgers at the 2021 United States Mixed Doubles Curling Championship which was held in a bio-secure bubble at the Wausau Curling Club in Wausau, Wisconsin in May 2021. There, the pair finished with a 1–4 record.

Casper would later team up with Delaney Strouse at the 2022 United States Mixed Doubles Curling Championship where the pair made it all the way to the 3 vs. 4 game before being defeated by Jamie Sinclair and Rich Ruohonen. Casper and Strouse would again compete at the 2023 United States Mixed Doubles Curling Championship, where they lost in a tiebreaker to Taylor Anderson and Ben Richardson. The following season, Casper would then compete in mixed doubles with Vicky Persinger, where they reached the quarterfinals of the 2024 United States Mixed Doubles Curling Championship where they were eliminated by John Shuster and Aileen Geving.

== Personal life ==
Casper began curling at the age of eleven at the Ardsley Curling Club. He graduated from the University of Minnesota in 2024 with a strategic communications degree. He previously attended Hackley School, graduating in 2019.

Casper was diagnosed in 2023 with Guillain-Barré Syndrome (GBS).

== Grand Slam record ==
Key
C	Champion
F	Lost in Final
SF	Lost in Semifinal
QF	Lost in Quarterfinals
R16	Lost in the round of 16
Q	Did not advance to playoffs
T2	Played in Tier 2 event
DNP	Did not participate in event
N/A	Not a Grand Slam event that season

Event	2023–24	2024–25	2025–26	2026–27
Invitational	T2	T2	DNP	Q
Masters	DNP	DNP	T2	QF
National	DNP	DNP	DNP	QF
Open	Q	DNP	Q	
Players'	DNP	DNP	Q	

== Teams ==
Season	Skip	Third	Second	Lead	Alternate
2013–14	Eli Clawson	Caleb Clawson	Daniel Casper	Zachary Blough	
2015–16	Eli Clawson	Daniel Casper	Andrew Gittis	Christopher Pingitore	
2016–17	Chase Sinnett	Eli Clawson	Andrew Gittis	Daniel Casper	Evan Mullaney
2017–18	Eli Clawson	Daniel Casper	Marius Kleinas	Christopher Pingitore	
2018–19	Tyler Hipke	Daniel Casper	Connor Hipke	Matthew Rosenbloom	
2018–19	Daniel Casper	Marius Kleinas	Brice Sinnett	Benjamin Grady	
2019–20	Daniel Casper	Marius Kleinas	Sam Willertz	Benjamin Grady	Jacob Zeman
2020–21	Daniel Casper	Marius Kleinas	Ethan Sampson	Coleman Thurston	
2021–22	Daniel Casper	Ethan Sampson	Samuel Strouse	Coleman Thurston	Marius Kleinas
2022–23	Daniel Casper	Luc Violette	Ben Richardson	Chase Sinnett	
2023–24	Daniel Casper	Luc Violette	Ben Richardson	Chase Sinnett	
2024–25	Daniel Casper	Luc Violette	Ben Richardson	Aidan Oldenburg	Rich Ruohonen
2025–26	Daniel Casper	Luc Violette	Ben Richardson	Aidan Oldenburg	Rich Ruohonen
2026–27	Daniel Casper	Luc Violette	Ben Richardson	Aidan Oldenburg	
