= 2023 United States Men's Curling Championship =

- Host city: Denver, Colorado
- Arena: Denver Coliseum
- Dates: February 5-11
- Winner: (Minnesota) Team Shuster
- Skip: John Shuster
- Third: Chris Plys
- Second: Matt Hamilton
- Lead: John Landsteiner
- Alternate: Colin Hufman
- Coach: Steven Birklid
- Finalist: (Minnesota) Daniel Casper

The 2023 United States Men's Curling Championship was held from February 5 to 11, 2023 at the Denver Coliseum in Denver, Colorado. The event was held in conjunction with the 2023 United States Women's Curling Championship. This was the first Men's Championship in two years, after the 2022 Championship was cancelled due to the COVID-19 pandemic.

== Qualification ==
Teams qualified for the event according to the following procedure:

- Prior season's World Championship representative (Team Dropkin),
- 2022 Olympic representative (Team Shuster),
- Current season's World Junior Curling Championships representative (Team Sampson),
- Three highest-ranking teams (not already qualified) on the World Curling Federation YTD ranking system as of December 20, 2022 (Team Smith, Team Sobering, Team Strouse), and
- Highest-finishing team (not already qualified) in either of two qualifying events: the Curling Stadium Contender Series (Team Casper), and the Curl Mesabi Classic (Team Dunnam).

== Teams ==
Eight teams participated in the 2023 national championship.

Skip	Third	Second	Lead	Alternate	Locale
Daniel Casper	Luc Violette	Ben Richardson	Chase Sinnett		Chaska, Minnesota
Korey Dropkin	Andrew Stopera	Mark Fenner	Tom Howell		Duluth, Minnesota
Scott Dunnam	Cody Clouser	Lance Wheeler	Andy Dunnam		Philadelphia, Pennsylvania
Rich Ruohonen	Sam Strouse	Connor Kauffman	Aidan Oldenburg		Chaska, Minnesota
Ethan Sampson	Kevin Tuma	Coleman Thurston	Marius Kleinas	Jake Zeman	Chaska, Minnesota
John Shuster	Chris Plys	Matt Hamilton	John Landsteiner	Colin Hufman	Duluth, Minnesota
Jason Smith	Dominik Märki	Hunter Clawson	Jared Allen	Eli Clawson	Nashville, Tennessee
Darryl Sobering	Alec Celecki	DJ Johnson	Josh Chetwynd	Sean Stevinson	Denver, Colorado

== Round robin standings ==
Final round robin standings

Key
Teams to playoffs

Skip	W	L
Daniel Casper	6	1
John Shuster	5	2
Scott Dunnam	5	2
Korey Dropkin	4	3
Ethan Sampson	3	4
Jason Smith	3	4
Darryl Sobering	1	6
Rich Ruohonen	1	6

== Round robin results ==
All draw times are listed in Mountain Standard Time (UTC−07:00).

=== Draw 1 ===
Sunday, February 5, 7:00 pm

Sheet A	1	2	3	4	5	6	7	8	9	10	Final
John Shuster 🔨	1	0	0	2	1	0	0	2	0	0	6
Jason Smith	0	1	1	0	0	1	2	0	2	3	10

Sheet B	1	2	3	4	5	6	7	8	9	10	Final
Daniel Casper 🔨	2	0	0	2	0	2	0	0	1	0	7
Korey Dropkin	0	0	2	0	4	0	2	0	0	2	10

Sheet C	1	2	3	4	5	6	7	8	9	10	Final
Darryl Sobering 🔨	0	1	0	1	0	0	2	0	0	X	4
Scott Dunnam	2	0	1	0	2	1	0	1	1	X	8

Sheet D	1	2	3	4	5	6	7	8	9	10	Final
Ethan Sampson 🔨	1	1	0	0	0	0	2	0	0	X	4
Rich Ruohonen	0	0	0	2	1	1	0	0	3	X	7

=== Draw 2 ===
Monday, February 6, 2:00 pm

Sheet A	1	2	3	4	5	6	7	8	9	10	Final
Scott Dunnam	1	0	0	3	0	0	2	1	2	X	9
Korey Dropkin 🔨	0	1	1	0	2	1	0	0	0	X	5

Sheet B	1	2	3	4	5	6	7	8	9	10	Final
Jason Smith 🔨	1	2	0	0	2	1	0	2	0	X	8
Rich Ruohonen	0	0	1	2	0	0	2	0	1	X	6

Sheet C	1	2	3	4	5	6	7	8	9	10	11	Final
John Shuster 🔨	1	0	0	1	0	3	0	2	0	0	1	8
Ethan Sampson	0	0	2	0	2	0	1	0	1	1	0	7

Sheet D	1	2	3	4	5	6	7	8	9	10	Final
Daniel Casper 🔨	1	2	0	1	0	2	0	3	X	X	9
Darryl Sobering	0	0	1	0	1	0	2	0	X	X	4

=== Draw 3 ===
Tuesday, February 7, 8:00 am

Sheet A	1	2	3	4	5	6	7	8	9	10	Final
Darryl Sobering	0	1	0	1	0	1	X	X	X	X	3
John Shuster 🔨	4	0	5	0	1	0	X	X	X	X	10

Sheet B	1	2	3	4	5	6	7	8	9	10	Final
Korey Dropkin 🔨	0	2	0	1	0	1	0	0	0	1	5
Ethan Sampson	2	0	1	0	1	0	1	1	0	0	6

Sheet C	1	2	3	4	5	6	7	8	9	10	Final
Daniel Casper	0	0	2	0	2	0	2	0	2	1	9
Rich Ruohonen 🔨	1	3	0	1	0	1	0	2	0	0	8

Sheet D	1	2	3	4	5	6	7	8	9	10	Final
Jason Smith	0	2	0	0	0	1	0	X	X	X	3
Scott Dunnam 🔨	2	0	0	2	1	0	4	X	X	X	9

=== Draw 4 ===
Tuesday, February 7, 4:00 pm

Sheet A	1	2	3	4	5	6	7	8	9	10	Final
Daniel Casper 🔨	0	1	0	2	2	0	1	2	X	X	8
Ethan Sampson	0	0	1	0	0	1	0	0	X	X	2

Sheet B	1	2	3	4	5	6	7	8	9	10	Final
Darryl Sobering	0	2	0	0	1	0	1	0	X	X	4
Jason Smith 🔨	2	0	3	0	0	3	0	2	X	X	10

Sheet C	1	2	3	4	5	6	7	8	9	10	Final
Scott Dunnam 🔨	0	0	1	1	0	0	1	0	X	X	3
John Shuster	0	0	0	0	2	2	0	4	X	X	8

Sheet D	1	2	3	4	5	6	7	8	9	10	Final
Rich Ruohonen	0	0	1	0	0	0	0	0	X	X	1
Korey Dropkin 🔨	0	2	0	0	1	0	3	2	X	X	8

=== Draw 5 ===
Wednesday, February 8, 10:00 am

Sheet A	1	2	3	4	5	6	7	8	9	10	Final
Rich Ruohonen	0	1	3	0	0	0	0	X	X	X	4
Scott Dunnam 🔨	2	0	0	2	3	1	1	X	X	X	9

Sheet B	1	2	3	4	5	6	7	8	9	10	Final
John Shuster	0	0	1	0	0	2	0	0	X	X	3
Daniel Casper 🔨	1	0	0	1	1	0	3	4	X	X	10

Sheet C	1	2	3	4	5	6	7	8	9	10	Final
Jason Smith	0	0	2	0	0	1	0	0	1	0	4
Korey Dropkin 🔨	1	2	0	1	0	0	0	1	0	1	6

Sheet D	1	2	3	4	5	6	7	8	9	10	Final
Darryl Sobering 🔨	0	0	0	1	0	0	0	X	X	X	1
Ethan Sampson	0	1	3	0	1	1	1	X	X	X	7

=== Draw 6 ===
Wednesday, February 8, 7:00 pm

Sheet A	1	2	3	4	5	6	7	8	9	10	Final
Jason Smith	0	0	0	1	0	0	0	0	X	X	1
Daniel Casper 🔨	0	1	1	0	0	0	3	5	X	X	10

Sheet B	1	2	3	4	5	6	7	8	9	10	Final
Ethan Sampson	0	0	0	0	1	0	X	X	X	X	1
Scott Dunnam 🔨	0	1	0	3	0	3	X	X	X	X	7

Sheet C	1	2	3	4	5	6	7	8	9	10	Final
Rich Ruohonen	0	0	1	0	2	0	2	0	X	X	5
Darryl Sobering 🔨	2	0	0	2	0	1	0	5	X	X	10

Sheet D	1	2	3	4	5	6	7	8	9	10	Final
Korey Dropkin	0	1	0	0	1	0	1	0	0	0	3
John Shuster 🔨	1	0	0	2	0	0	0	2	0	1	6

=== Draw 7 ===
Thursday, February 9, 2:00 pm

Sheet A	1	2	3	4	5	6	7	8	9	10	Final
Korey Dropkin 🔨	2	0	2	0	0	1	0	1	0	2	8
Darryl Sobering	0	2	0	1	1	0	1	0	0	0	5

Sheet B	1	2	3	4	5	6	7	8	9	10	Final
Rich Ruohonen	1	0	0	0	1	1	0	1	0	0	4
John Shuster 🔨	0	1	0	1	0	0	2	0	1	1	6

Sheet C	1	2	3	4	5	6	7	8	9	10	Final
Ethan Sampson 🔨	0	0	2	0	0	3	0	3	0	X	8
Jason Smith	0	0	0	0	2	0	1	0	2	X	5

Sheet D	1	2	3	4	5	6	7	8	9	10	Final
Scott Dunnam	0	0	0	0	2	0	0	X	X	X	2
Daniel Casper 🔨	2	1	1	1	0	2	1	X	X	X	8

== Playoffs ==
Page playoff system
1	(Minnesota) Daniel Casper	5
2	(Minnesota) John Shuster	8
3	(Pennsylvania) Scott Dunnam	5
4	(Minnesota) Korey Dropkin	14

Semifinal
1	(Minnesota) Daniel Casper	8
4	(Minnesota) Korey Dropkin	5

Final
2	(Minnesota) John Shuster	8
1	(Minnesota) Daniel Casper	3

=== 1 vs. 2 ===
Friday, February 10, 2:00 pm

Team	1	2	3	4	5	6	7	8	9	10	Final
(Minnesota) Daniel Casper	0	2	0	1	0	1	0	0	1	X	5
(Minnesota) John Shuster 🔨	1	0	2	0	1	0	2	2	0	X	8

=== 3 vs. 4 ===
Friday, February 10, 2:00 pm

Team	1	2	3	4	5	6	7	8	9	10	Final
(Pennsylvania) Scott Dunnam 🔨	1	1	0	1	0	0	2	0	X	X	5
(Minnesota) Korey Dropkin	0	0	2	0	5	4	0	3	X	X	14

=== Semifinal ===
Friday, February 10, 7:00 pm

Sheet 4	1	2	3	4	5	6	7	8	9	10	Final
(Minnesota) Daniel Casper 🔨	2	0	2	0	0	2	1	1	0	X	8
(Minnesota) Korey Dropkin	0	1	0	2	1	0	0	0	1	X	5

=== Final ===
Saturday, February 11, 12:00 pm

Sheet 4	1	2	3	4	5	6	7	8	9	10	Final
(Minnesota) John Shuster 🔨	2	0	0	1	0	2	0	3	X	X	8
(Minnesota) Daniel Casper	0	0	0	0	1	0	2	0	X	X	3
