= 2025 Trentino Curling World Cup =

- Host city: Cembra, Trentino, Italy
- Arena: Palacurling Cembra
- Dates: August 28–31
- Winner: (Switzerland) Team Schwaller
- Curling club: CC Genève, Geneva
- Skip: Yannick Schwaller
- Fourth: Benoît Schwarz-van Berkel
- Second: Sven Michel
- Lead: Pablo Lachat-Couchepin
- Finalist: (United States) Daniel Casper

The 2025 Trentino Curling World Cup was held from August 28 to 31 at Palacurling Cembra in Cembra, Trentino, Italy. The event was held in a round-robin format with a € 27,000 purse.

The event was organized by Team Joël Retornaz in collaboration with the Curling Cembra Association and the Trentino Curling Cembra ASD to bring a high-level international curling event to Italy ahead of the 2026 Winter Olympics. It followed the same format as the 2024 Cortina Curling Cup women's event held the year prior with ten teams from six nations making up the field. Among them were world number two ranked Team Yannick Schwaller of Switzerland, reigning European champions Team Marc Muskatewitz of Germany and newly crowned Baden Masters champions Team Marco Hösli, also of Switzerland.

== Teams ==
The teams are listed as follows:

Skip	Third	Second	Lead	Alternate	Locale
Tetsuro Shimizu (Fourth)	Shinya Abe (Skip)	Hayato Sato	Haruto Ouchi	Sota Tsuruga	Sapporo, Japan
Michael Brunner	Anthony Petoud	Romano Meier	Andreas Gerlach		Bern, Switzerland
Daniel Casper	Luc Violette	Ben Richardson	Aidan Oldenburg	Rich Ruohonen	(United States) Chaska, Minnesota
Alberto Zisa (Fourth)	Giacomo Colli (Skip)	Francesco De Zanna	Fabio Ribotta		Trentino, Italy
John Epping	Jacob Horgan	Tanner Horgan	Ian McMillan		(Canada) Sudbury, Ontario
Philipp Hösli (Fourth)	Marco Hösli (Skip)	Simon Gloor	Justin Hausherr		Glarus, Switzerland
Rylan Kleiter	Joshua Mattern	Matthew Hall	Trevor Johnson		(Canada) Saskatoon, Saskatchewan
Marc Muskatewitz	Benjamin Kapp	Felix Messenzehl	Johannes Scheuerl	Mario Trevisiol	Füssen, Germany
Joël Retornaz	Amos Mosaner	Sebastiano Arman	Mattia Giovanella		Trentino, Italy
Benoît Schwarz-van Berkel (Fourth)	Yannick Schwaller (Skip)	Sven Michel	Pablo Lachat-Couchepin		Geneva, Switzerland

=== WCF ranking ===
Year to date World Curling Federation order of merit ranking for each team prior to the event.

Team	Rank	Points
(Switzerland) Yannick Schwaller	2	426.8
(Switzerland) Marco Hösli	6	298.3
(Germany) Marc Muskatewitz	8	291.8
(Italy) Joël Retornaz	10	245.8
(Canada) John Epping	11	238.8
(Canada) Rylan Kleiter	16	186.6
(Switzerland) Michael Brunner	17	182.9
(Japan) Shinya Abe	20	168.3
(United States) Daniel Casper	25	147.9
(Italy) Giacomo Colli	56	48.9

== Round robin standings ==
Final Round Robin Standings

Key
Teams to Playoffs

Pool A	W	L	PF	PA
(United States) Daniel Casper	3	1	22	22
(Canada) John Epping	3	1	28	18
(Germany) Marc Muskatewitz	2	2	20	21
(Switzerland) Marco Hösli	1	3	23	26
(Italy) Giacomo Colli	1	3	19	25

Pool B	W	L	PF	PA
(Switzerland) Yannick Schwaller	4	0	34	16
(Canada) Rylan Kleiter	2	2	18	22
(Japan) Shinya Abe	2	2	17	25
(Italy) Joël Retornaz	1	3	24	29
(Switzerland) Michael Brunner	1	3	22	23

== Round robin results ==
All draw times listed in Central European Time (UTC+01:00).

=== Draw 1 ===
Thursday, August 28, 10:00 am

Sheet 1	1	2	3	4	5	6	7	8	Final
(Switzerland) Yannick Schwaller 🔨	0	5	0	1	1	0	3	X	10
(Japan) Shinya Abe	0	0	1	0	0	2	0	X	3

Sheet 2	1	2	3	4	5	6	7	8	Final
(Italy) Joël Retornaz 🔨	0	2	0	2	0	1	1	3	9
(Switzerland) Michael Brunner	1	0	2	0	2	0	0	0	5

=== Draw 2 ===
Thursday, August 28, 2:00 pm

Sheet 1	1	2	3	4	5	6	7	8	Final
(Switzerland) Marco Hösli 🔨	1	0	2	0	2	0	1	0	6
(Germany) Marc Muskatewitz	0	3	0	1	0	1	0	3	8

Sheet 2	1	2	3	4	5	6	7	8	Final
(Italy) Giacomo Colli	1	0	0	3	0	4	X	X	8
(United States) Daniel Casper 🔨	0	0	2	0	1	0	X	X	3

=== Draw 3 ===
Friday, August 29, 8:30 am

Sheet 1	1	2	3	4	5	6	7	8	Final
(Switzerland) Marco Hösli	0	3	0	1	0	2	2	X	8
(Italy) Giacomo Colli 🔨	1	0	0	0	3	0	0	X	4

Sheet 2	1	2	3	4	5	6	7	8	Final
(Canada) John Epping	0	0	1	1	0	0	4	0	6
(United States) Daniel Casper 🔨	2	1	0	0	2	1	0	1	7

=== Draw 4 ===
Friday, August 29, 12:00 pm

Sheet 1	1	2	3	4	5	6	7	8	Final
(Switzerland) Yannick Schwaller	0	3	0	2	0	3	X	X	8
(Canada) Rylan Kleiter 🔨	1	0	1	0	1	0	X	X	3

Sheet 2	1	2	3	4	5	6	7	8	9	Final
(Japan) Shinya Abe	0	2	0	0	0	2	0	0	1	5
(Switzerland) Michael Brunner 🔨	1	0	0	0	2	0	0	1	0	4

=== Draw 5 ===
Friday, August 29, 4:00 pm

Sheet 1	1	2	3	4	5	6	7	8	Final
(Canada) John Epping 🔨	2	0	2	0	0	2	0	1	7
(Germany) Marc Muskatewitz	0	1	0	3	0	0	1	0	5

Sheet 2	1	2	3	4	5	6	7	8	Final
(United States) Daniel Casper	0	0	0	4	1	0	2	1	8
(Switzerland) Marco Hösli 🔨	0	2	1	0	0	3	0	0	6

=== Draw 6 ===
Friday, August 29, 8:00 pm

Sheet 1	1	2	3	4	5	6	7	8	9	Final
(Italy) Joël Retornaz	0	0	2	0	2	1	0	1	0	6
(Canada) Rylan Kleiter 🔨	0	4	0	2	0	0	0	0	1	7

Sheet 2	1	2	3	4	5	6	7	8	9	Final
(Switzerland) Michael Brunner 🔨	1	0	1	0	1	1	0	2	0	6
(Switzerland) Yannick Schwaller	0	2	0	3	0	0	1	0	1	7

=== Draw 7 ===
Saturday, August 30, 8:30 am

Sheet 1	1	2	3	4	5	6	7	8	Final
(Canada) John Epping	1	0	2	1	0	5	X	X	9
(Italy) Giacomo Colli 🔨	0	1	0	0	2	0	X	X	3

Sheet 2	1	2	3	4	5	6	7	8	Final
(United States) Daniel Casper 🔨	1	0	0	1	2	0	0	X	4
(Germany) Marc Muskatewitz	0	1	0	0	0	1	0	X	2

=== Draw 8 ===
Saturday, August 30, 12:00 pm

Sheet 1	1	2	3	4	5	6	7	8	Final
(Italy) Joël Retornaz 🔨	0	1	0	0	1	1	2	0	5
(Japan) Shinya Abe	1	0	2	2	0	0	0	3	8

Sheet 2	1	2	3	4	5	6	7	8	Final
(Switzerland) Michael Brunner	1	1	0	1	1	0	3	X	7
(Canada) Rylan Kleiter 🔨	0	0	1	0	0	1	0	X	2

=== Draw 9 ===
Saturday, August 30, 4:00 pm

Sheet 1	1	2	3	4	5	6	7	8	Final
(Italy) Giacomo Colli 🔨	1	0	1	0	0	2	0	0	4
(Germany) Marc Muskatewitz	0	1	0	1	0	0	2	1	5

Sheet 2	1	2	3	4	5	6	7	8	Final
(Switzerland) Marco Hösli	0	0	0	1	0	2	0	0	3
(Canada) John Epping 🔨	1	1	0	0	2	0	1	1	6

=== Draw 10 ===
Saturday, August 30, 8:00 pm

Sheet 1	1	2	3	4	5	6	7	8	Final
(Japan) Shinya Abe 🔨	0	1	0	0	0	X	X	X	1
(Canada) Rylan Kleiter	1	0	3	1	1	X	X	X	6

Sheet 2	1	2	3	4	5	6	7	8	Final
(Switzerland) Yannick Schwaller 🔨	0	0	0	4	0	2	3	X	9
(Italy) Joël Retornaz	1	0	1	0	2	0	0	X	4

== Playoffs ==
Semifinals
A1	(United States) Daniel Casper	7
B2	(Canada) Rylan Kleiter	4
B1	(Switzerland) Yannick Schwaller	8
A2	(Canada) John Epping	4

Final
A1	(United States) Daniel Casper	6
B1	(Switzerland) Yannick Schwaller	7

=== Semifinals ===
Sunday, August 31, 10:00 am

Sheet 1	1	2	3	4	5	6	7	8	Final
(United States) Daniel Casper 🔨	2	0	0	1	0	1	0	3	7
(Canada) Rylan Kleiter	0	1	0	0	1	0	2	0	4

Sheet 2	1	2	3	4	5	6	7	8	Final
(Switzerland) Yannick Schwaller 🔨	1	0	1	0	3	0	3	X	8
(Canada) John Epping	0	1	0	1	0	2	0	X	4

=== Final ===
Sunday, August 31, 2:00 pm

Team	1	2	3	4	5	6	7	8	Final
(United States) Daniel Casper	0	0	3	0	0	0	3	X	6
(Switzerland) Yannick Schwaller 🔨	0	3	0	1	2	1	0	X	7
