= 2024 United States Men's Curling Championship =

2024 edition of Curling Championship

- Host city: East Rutherford, New Jersey
- Arena: The Rink at American Dream
- Dates: January 30 – February 4
- Winner: (Minnesota) Team Shuster
- Curling club: Duluth CC, Duluth
- Skip: John Shuster
- Third: Chris Plys
- Second: Colin Hufman
- Lead: Matt Hamilton
- Alternate: John Landsteiner
- Finalist: (Minnesota) Korey Dropkin

The 2024 United States Men's Curling Championship was held from January 30 to February 4 at The Rink at American Dream in East Rutherford, New Jersey. The event was held in conjunction with the 2024 United States Women's Curling Championship. The winning John Shuster rink represented the United States at the 2024 World Men's Curling Championship at the KSS Sports Complex in Schaffhausen, Switzerland. Team Shuster also earned the first berth into the 2025 United States Olympic Curling Trials.

== Qualification process ==
The following teams qualified to participate in the 2024 national championship:

Qualification	Berths	Qualifying Team(s)
2023 World Men's Curling Championship representative	1	(Minnesota) John Shuster
2023 Pan Continental Curling Championships representative	1	(Minnesota) Korey Dropkin
2024 World Junior Curling Championships representative	1	(Wisconsin) Wesley Wendling
Qualifying Event #1 (US Open of Curling)	1	(Minnesota) Daniel Casper
Qualifying Event #2 (Curl Mesabi Classic)	1	(Minnesota) Ethan Sampson
WCF Year-to-date points leaders (December 23, 2023)	3	(Pennsylvania) Scott Dunnam (Minnesota) Rich Ruohonen (Washington (state)) Nicholas Connolly
TOTAL	8	

== Teams ==
The teams are listed as follows:

Skip	Third	Second	Lead	Alternate	Locale
Daniel Casper	Luc Violette	Ben Richardson	Chase Sinnett		Chaska, Minnesota
Nicholas Connolly	Evan Workin	Chris Bond	Nathan Parry		(Washington (state)) Seattle, Washington
Korey Dropkin	Andrew Stopera	Mark Fenner	Thomas Howell		Duluth, Minnesota
Scott Dunnam	Cody Clouser	Lance Wheeler	Andrew Dunnam		Philadelphia, Pennsylvania
Rich Ruohonen	Jason Smith	Samuel Strouse	Jared Allen	Aidan Oldenburg	Minneapolis, Minnesota
Ethan Sampson	Coleman Thurston	Jacob Zeman	Marius Kleinas		Chaska, Minnesota
John Shuster	Chris Plys	Colin Hufman	Matt Hamilton	John Landsteiner	Duluth, Minnesota
Wesley Wendling	Jackson Bestland	Kevin Tuma	Jackson Armstrong	Caden Hebert	Wausau, Wisconsin

== Map of teams ==
2024 Men's Teams

== Round robin standings ==
Final Round Robin Standings

Key
Teams to Playoffs
Teams to Tiebreaker

Team	W	L	PF	PA	EW	EL	BE	SE
(Minnesota) John Shuster	7	0	65	21	31	16	3	16
(Minnesota) Korey Dropkin	5	2	52	29	28	20	9	8
(Minnesota) Daniel Casper	4	3	48	46	30	29	3	6
(Minnesota) Ethan Sampson	3	4	36	49	25	30	2	7
(Wisconsin) Wesley Wendling	3	4	47	49	25	34	2	3
(Pennsylvania) Scott Dunnam	3	4	45	52	29	34	1	6
(Washington (state)) Nicholas Connolly	2	5	32	55	25	27	4	6
(Minnesota) Rich Ruohonen	1	6	30	55	26	30	7	8

== Round robin results ==
All draw times are listed in Eastern Time (UTC−05:00).

=== Draw 1 ===
Tuesday, January 30, 9:00 am

Sheet A	1	2	3	4	5	6	7	8	9	10	Final
(Pennsylvania) Scott Dunnam 🔨	1	0	0	0	2	0	0	X	X	X	3
(Minnesota) John Shuster	0	2	2	3	0	2	1	X	X	X	10

Sheet B	1	2	3	4	5	6	7	8	9	10	Final
(Wisconsin) Wesley Wendling	0	1	0	1	0	1	3	0	0	0	6
(Minnesota) Ethan Sampson 🔨	1	0	2	0	1	0	0	1	1	2	8

Sheet C	1	2	3	4	5	6	7	8	9	10	Final
(Minnesota) Daniel Casper	2	0	3	0	1	0	1	0	2	X	9
(Minnesota) Rich Ruohonen 🔨	0	1	0	1	0	1	0	1	0	X	4

Sheet D	1	2	3	4	5	6	7	8	9	10	Final
(Minnesota) Korey Dropkin 🔨	0	0	2	0	3	0	5	X	X	X	10
(Washington (state)) Nicholas Connolly	0	1	0	1	0	1	0	X	X	X	3

=== Draw 2 ===
Tuesday, January 30, 7:00 pm

Sheet A	1	2	3	4	5	6	7	8	9	10	Final
(Minnesota) Rich Ruohonen 🔨	1	0	1	1	0	1	0	0	0	0	4
(Minnesota) Ethan Sampson	0	2	0	0	0	0	1	2	0	2	7

Sheet B	1	2	3	4	5	6	7	8	9	10	Final
(Minnesota) John Shuster 🔨	0	2	2	0	4	3	X	X	X	X	11
(Washington (state)) Nicholas Connolly	1	0	0	1	0	0	X	X	X	X	2

Sheet C	1	2	3	4	5	6	7	8	9	10	Final
(Pennsylvania) Scott Dunnam 🔨	4	0	0	2	1	1	0	0	0	X	8
(Minnesota) Korey Dropkin	0	2	1	0	0	0	1	1	1	X	6

Sheet D	1	2	3	4	5	6	7	8	9	10	Final
(Wisconsin) Wesley Wendling 🔨	0	1	0	4	0	5	0	1	X	X	11
(Minnesota) Daniel Casper	1	0	1	0	2	0	1	0	X	X	5

=== Draw 3 ===
Wednesday, January 31, 12:00 pm

Sheet A	1	2	3	4	5	6	7	8	9	10	Final
(Minnesota) Daniel Casper 🔨	3	2	0	1	0	0	3	0	2	X	11
(Pennsylvania) Scott Dunnam	0	0	2	0	1	1	0	2	0	X	6

Sheet B	1	2	3	4	5	6	7	8	9	10	Final
(Minnesota) Ethan Sampson	0	0	0	1	0	1	0	0	X	X	2
(Minnesota) Korey Dropkin 🔨	2	0	1	0	2	0	1	2	X	X	8

Sheet C	1	2	3	4	5	6	7	8	9	10	Final
(Wisconsin) Wesley Wendling 🔨	0	0	2	0	3	0	1	0	4	X	10
(Washington (state)) Nicholas Connolly	0	1	0	2	0	1	0	1	0	X	5

Sheet D	1	2	3	4	5	6	7	8	9	10	Final
(Minnesota) John Shuster 🔨	0	3	0	3	1	0	0	3	X	X	10
(Minnesota) Rich Ruohonen	0	0	3	0	0	0	1	0	X	X	4

=== Draw 4 ===
Wednesday, January 31, 8:00 pm

Sheet A	1	2	3	4	5	6	7	8	9	10	Final
(Wisconsin) Wesley Wendling	0	0	1	0	0	2	0	1	X	X	4
(Minnesota) Korey Dropkin 🔨	0	3	0	2	1	0	2	0	X	X	8

Sheet B	1	2	3	4	5	6	7	8	9	10	Final
(Minnesota) Daniel Casper 🔨	1	0	2	1	0	0	0	0	1	X	5
(Minnesota) John Shuster	0	1	0	0	1	1	2	3	0	X	8

Sheet C	1	2	3	4	5	6	7	8	9	10	11	Final
(Minnesota) Rich Ruohonen 🔨	1	0	1	0	0	1	0	0	1	1	0	5
(Pennsylvania) Scott Dunnam	0	1	0	0	2	0	1	1	0	0	1	6

Sheet D	1	2	3	4	5	6	7	8	9	10	Final
(Washington (state)) Nicholas Connolly 🔨	0	0	0	1	0	1	X	X	X	X	2
(Minnesota) Ethan Sampson	1	2	1	0	4	0	X	X	X	X	8

=== Draw 5 ===
Thursday, February 1, 2:00 pm

Sheet A	1	2	3	4	5	6	7	8	9	10	Final
(Washington (state)) Nicholas Connolly 🔨	2	0	0	2	0	0	0	0	2	2	8
(Minnesota) Rich Ruohonen	0	0	0	0	2	1	1	0	0	0	4

Sheet B	1	2	3	4	5	6	7	8	9	10	Final
(Pennsylvania) Scott Dunnam 🔨	1	0	0	2	0	1	0	1	1	0	6
(Wisconsin) Wesley Wendling	0	1	2	0	2	0	1	0	0	2	8

Sheet C	1	2	3	4	5	6	7	8	9	10	Final
(Minnesota) John Shuster 🔨	2	2	0	2	1	2	X	X	X	X	9
(Minnesota) Ethan Sampson	0	0	1	0	0	0	X	X	X	X	1

Sheet D	1	2	3	4	5	6	7	8	9	10	Final
(Minnesota) Daniel Casper 🔨	1	0	0	0	1	0	0	0	X	X	2
(Minnesota) Korey Dropkin	0	0	2	3	0	0	0	2	X	X	7

=== Draw 6 ===
Friday, February 2, 9:00 am

Sheet A	1	2	3	4	5	6	7	8	9	10	Final
(Minnesota) John Shuster	0	1	2	1	0	3	2	X	X	X	9
(Wisconsin) Wesley Wendling 🔨	0	0	0	0	1	0	0	X	X	X	1

Sheet B	1	2	3	4	5	6	7	8	9	10	Final
(Minnesota) Korey Dropkin 🔨	2	1	0	2	0	0	3	X	X	X	8
(Minnesota) Rich Ruohonen	0	0	1	0	1	0	0	X	X	X	2

Sheet C	1	2	3	4	5	6	7	8	9	10	Final
(Washington (state)) Nicholas Connolly 🔨	1	0	0	1	0	0	1	0	1	X	4
(Minnesota) Daniel Casper	0	2	1	0	1	1	0	2	0	X	7

Sheet D	1	2	3	4	5	6	7	8	9	10	Final
(Minnesota) Ethan Sampson	0	1	0	1	0	2	0	0	X	X	4
(Pennsylvania) Scott Dunnam 🔨	2	0	2	0	4	0	2	1	X	X	11

=== Draw 7 ===
Friday, February 2, 7:00 pm

Sheet A	1	2	3	4	5	6	7	8	9	10	Final
(Minnesota) Ethan Sampson 🔨	1	0	1	0	1	0	1	0	2	0	6
(Minnesota) Daniel Casper	0	1	0	2	0	2	0	3	0	1	9

Sheet B	1	2	3	4	5	6	7	8	9	10	Final
(Washington (state)) Nicholas Connolly 🔨	2	0	2	1	0	1	0	1	0	1	8
(Pennsylvania) Scott Dunnam	0	1	0	0	1	0	1	0	2	0	5

Sheet C	1	2	3	4	5	6	7	8	9	10	Final
(Minnesota) Korey Dropkin 🔨	0	2	0	0	1	0	1	0	1	X	5
(Minnesota) John Shuster	0	0	3	0	0	3	0	2	0	X	8

Sheet D	1	2	3	4	5	6	7	8	9	10	Final
(Minnesota) Rich Ruohonen	2	0	2	0	0	1	1	1	0	1	8
(Wisconsin) Wesley Wendling 🔨	0	2	0	1	2	0	0	0	2	0	7

== Tiebreaker ==
Saturday, February 3, 7:30 am

Sheet D	1	2	3	4	5	6	7	8	9	10	Final
(Minnesota) Ethan Sampson 🔨	1	1	0	0	0	0	0	3	0	0	5
(Wisconsin) Wesley Wendling	0	0	1	1	1	1	2	0	2	1	9

== Playoffs ==
Page playoff system
1	(Minnesota) John Shuster	5
2	(Minnesota) Korey Dropkin	9
3	(Minnesota) Daniel Casper	11
4	(Wisconsin) Wesley Wendling	6

Semifinal
1	(Minnesota) John Shuster	7
3	(Minnesota) Daniel Casper	5

Final
2	(Minnesota) Korey Dropkin	6
1	(Minnesota) John Shuster	11

=== 1 vs. 2 ===
Saturday, February 3, 12:00 pm

Sheet C	1	2	3	4	5	6	7	8	9	10	Final
(Minnesota) John Shuster 🔨	1	0	0	1	0	0	0	3	0	X	5
(Minnesota) Korey Dropkin	0	1	0	0	3	0	3	0	2	X	9

=== 3 vs. 4 ===
Saturday, February 3, 12:00 pm

Sheet A	1	2	3	4	5	6	7	8	9	10	Final
(Minnesota) Daniel Casper 🔨	1	2	0	2	0	2	2	0	2	X	11
(Wisconsin) Wesley Wendling	0	0	2	0	3	0	0	1	0	X	6

=== Semifinal ===
Saturday, February 3, 7:00 pm

Sheet C	1	2	3	4	5	6	7	8	9	10	Final
(Minnesota) John Shuster 🔨	0	0	1	0	0	2	2	1	0	1	7
(Minnesota) Daniel Casper	0	1	0	1	0	0	0	0	3	0	5

=== Final ===
Sunday, February 4, 4:00 pm

Sheet C	1	2	3	4	5	6	7	8	9	10	Final
(Minnesota) Korey Dropkin 🔨	0	3	0	1	0	1	0	1	0	X	6
(Minnesota) John Shuster	0	0	2	0	1	0	5	0	3	X	11

2024 United States Men's Curling Championship

John Shuster
10th United States Championship title
