= 2025 United States Men's Curling Championship =

- Host city: Duluth, Minnesota
- Arena: Duluth Entertainment Convention Center
- Dates: January 27 – February 2
- Winner: (Minnesota) Team Dropkin
- Curling club: Duluth CC, Duluth
- Skip: Korey Dropkin
- Third: Thomas Howell
- Second: Andrew Stopera
- Lead: Mark Fenner
- Coach: Mark Lazar
- Finalist: (Minnesota) Daniel Casper

The 2025 United States Men's Curling Championship was held from January 27 to February 2 at the Duluth Entertainment Convention Center in Duluth, Minnesota. The event was held in conjunction with the 2025 United States Women's Curling Championship. The winning Korey Dropkin rink represented the United States at the 2025 World Men's Curling Championship at Mosaic Place in Moose Jaw, Saskatchewan, Canada. The winning team will also earn a berth into the 2025 United States Olympic Curling Trials.

== Qualification process ==
The following teams qualified to participate in the 2025 national championship:

Qualification	Berths	Qualifying Team(s)
2024 World Men's Curling Championship representative	1	(Minnesota) John Shuster
2025 World Junior Curling Championships representative	1	(Minnesota) Wesley Wendling
WCF Team Ranking points leaders (September 25, 2024)	2	(Minnesota) Korey Dropkin (Minnesota) Daniel Casper
Qualifying Event (St. Paul Cash Spiel)	2	(Pennsylvania) Scott Dunnam (Minnesota) Chase Sinnett
WCF Year-to-date points leaders (December 26, 2024)	2	(Minnesota) Ethan Sampson (North Dakota) Timothy Hodek
TOTAL	8	

== Teams ==
The teams are listed as follows:

Skip	Third	Second	Lead	Alternate	Locale
Daniel Casper	Luc Violette	Ben Richardson	Aidan Oldenburg	Rich Ruohonen	Chaska, Minnesota
Korey Dropkin	Thomas Howell	Andrew Stopera	Mark Fenner		Duluth, Minnesota
Scott Dunnam	Cody Clouser	Lance Wheeler	Andrew Dunnam		Philadelphia, Pennsylvania
Timothy Hodek	Evan Workin	Josh Moore	Nathan Parry		Fargo, North Dakota
Ethan Sampson	Coleman Thurston	Jacob Zeman	Marius Kleinas		Chaska, Minnesota
John Shuster	Chris Plys	Colin Hufman	Matt Hamilton	John Landsteiner	Duluth, Minnesota
Samuel Strouse (Fourth)	Kevin Tuma	Chase Sinnett (Skip)	Connor Kauffman	Caden Hebert	Minneapolis, Minnesota
Wesley Wendling	Daniel Laufer	Nicholas Cenzalli	Shaheen Bassiri	Dylan Ciapka	Chaska, Minnesota

== Round robin standings ==
Final Round Robin Standings

Key
Teams to Playoffs
Teams to Tiebreaker

Team	W	L	W–L	PF	PA	EW	EL	BE	SE
(Minnesota) Daniel Casper	7	0	–	54	30	32	23	3	7
(Minnesota) Korey Dropkin	5	2	1–0	52	26	30	17	4	14
(Minnesota) John Shuster	5	2	0–1	55	35	30	24	8	6
(Minnesota) Chase Sinnett	3	4	1–0	42	50	28	29	4	7
(Minnesota) Ethan Sampson	3	4	0–1	40	40	28	28	4	7
(Pennsylvania) Scott Dunnam	2	5	1–0	40	60	26	33	1	4
(North Dakota) Timothy Hodek	2	5	0–1	51	52	28	29	3	9
(Minnesota) Wesley Wendling	1	6	–	20	61	15	34	7	2

== Round robin results ==
All draw times are listed in Central Time (UTC−06:00).

=== Draw 1 ===
Monday, January 27, 7:00 pm

Sheet A	1	2	3	4	5	6	7	8	9	10	Final
(Minnesota) Daniel Casper	1	0	2	3	0	2	1	X	X	X	9
(Minnesota) Wesley Wendling	0	1	0	0	1	0	0	X	X	X	2

Sheet B	1	2	3	4	5	6	7	8	9	10	Final
(North Dakota) Timothy Hodek	0	3	0	0	0	3	1	2	1	0	10
(Minnesota) Ethan Sampson	2	0	3	1	1	0	0	0	0	4	11

Sheet C	1	2	3	4	5	6	7	8	9	10	Final
(Minnesota) John Shuster	1	0	2	0	0	0	0	6	X	X	9
(Minnesota) Chase Sinnett	0	1	0	0	1	0	0	0	X	X	2

Sheet D	1	2	3	4	5	6	7	8	9	10	Final
(Pennsylvania) Scott Dunnam	0	0	0	0	0	2	X	X	X	X	2
(Minnesota) Korey Dropkin	2	1	2	3	3	0	X	X	X	X	11

=== Draw 2 ===
Tuesday, January 28, 2:00 pm

Sheet A	1	2	3	4	5	6	7	8	9	10	11	Final
(Minnesota) Chase Sinnett	0	0	2	0	2	0	1	0	1	0	2	8
(Minnesota) Ethan Sampson	1	0	0	1	0	1	0	2	0	1	0	6

Sheet B	1	2	3	4	5	6	7	8	9	10	Final
(Minnesota) Wesley Wendling	0	0	0	0	0	0	X	X	X	X	0
(Minnesota) Korey Dropkin	2	0	1	3	1	3	X	X	X	X	10

Sheet C	1	2	3	4	5	6	7	8	9	10	Final
(Minnesota) Daniel Casper	2	0	3	0	1	0	2	2	X	X	10
(Pennsylvania) Scott Dunnam	0	2	0	1	0	1	0	0	X	X	4

Sheet D	1	2	3	4	5	6	7	8	9	10	Final
(North Dakota) Timothy Hodek	0	0	0	0	2	0	1	0	X	X	3
(Minnesota) John Shuster	0	1	0	1	0	4	0	2	X	X	8

=== Draw 3 ===
Wednesday, January 29, 8:00 am

Sheet A	1	2	3	4	5	6	7	8	9	10	11	Final
(Minnesota) John Shuster	0	2	0	0	2	0	0	2	0	1	0	7
(Minnesota) Daniel Casper	2	0	1	0	0	1	2	0	1	0	1	8

Sheet B	1	2	3	4	5	6	7	8	9	10	Final
(Minnesota) Ethan Sampson	0	1	0	1	0	2	2	0	0	1	7
(Pennsylvania) Scott Dunnam	0	0	1	0	1	0	0	1	1	0	4

Sheet C	1	2	3	4	5	6	7	8	9	10	Final
(North Dakota) Timothy Hodek	0	1	0	0	1	0	0	0	0	X	2
(Minnesota) Korey Dropkin	1	0	2	1	0	0	0	1	2	X	7

Sheet D	1	2	3	4	5	6	7	8	9	10	Final
(Minnesota) Wesley Wendling	2	0	0	0	0	1	0	1	1	0	5
(Minnesota) Chase Sinnett	0	2	1	1	1	0	3	0	0	1	9

=== Draw 4 ===
Wednesday, January 29, 4:00 pm

Sheet A	1	2	3	4	5	6	7	8	9	10	Final
(Minnesota) Korey Dropkin	0	2	0	0	2	0	3	1	X	X	8
(Minnesota) Chase Sinnett	0	0	0	1	0	2	0	0	X	X	3

Sheet B	1	2	3	4	5	6	7	8	9	10	Final
(Minnesota) Daniel Casper	1	0	1	0	1	2	0	0	1	0	6
(North Dakota) Timothy Hodek	0	1	0	1	0	0	1	0	0	2	5

Sheet C	1	2	3	4	5	6	7	8	9	10	Final
(Minnesota) Wesley Wendling	0	0	0	1	0	0	0	1	0	1	3
(Minnesota) Ethan Sampson	0	0	1	0	1	0	0	0	0	0	2

Sheet D	1	2	3	4	5	6	7	8	9	10	Final
(Minnesota) John Shuster	0	1	0	1	0	2	2	0	5	X	11
(Pennsylvania) Scott Dunnam	3	0	1	0	1	0	0	1	0	X	6

=== Draw 5 ===
Thursday, January 30, 10:00 am

Sheet A	1	2	3	4	5	6	7	8	9	10	11	Final
(North Dakota) Timothy Hodek	0	3	2	0	0	1	0	1	0	1	0	8
(Pennsylvania) Scott Dunnam	3	0	0	2	0	0	2	0	1	0	2	10

Sheet B	1	2	3	4	5	6	7	8	9	10	Final
(Minnesota) John Shuster	1	2	0	1	0	3	1	1	X	X	9
(Minnesota) Wesley Wendling	0	0	1	0	1	0	0	0	X	X	2

Sheet C	1	2	3	4	5	6	7	8	9	10	Final
(Minnesota) Chase Sinnett	0	1	1	0	0	0	2	0	1	X	5
(Minnesota) Daniel Casper	1	0	0	1	0	2	0	3	0	X	7

Sheet D	1	2	3	4	5	6	7	8	9	10	Final
(Minnesota) Korey Dropkin	0	0	1	1	0	1	0	0	1	0	4
(Minnesota) Ethan Sampson	0	1	0	0	1	0	0	1	0	2	5

=== Draw 6 ===
Thursday, January 30, 7:00 pm

Sheet A	1	2	3	4	5	6	7	8	9	10	Final
(Minnesota) Wesley Wendling	0	0	0	0	2	0	X	X	X	X	2
(North Dakota) Timothy Hodek	1	1	4	5	0	3	X	X	X	X	14

Sheet B	1	2	3	4	5	6	7	8	9	10	Final
(Pennsylvania) Scott Dunnam	0	0	1	0	0	2	0	0	2	1	6
(Minnesota) Chase Sinnett	1	2	0	2	0	0	1	1	0	0	7

Sheet C	1	2	3	4	5	6	7	8	9	10	Final
(Minnesota) Korey Dropkin	0	2	0	3	0	1	0	2	1	X	9
(Minnesota) John Shuster	2	0	1	0	1	0	1	0	0	X	5

Sheet D	1	2	3	4	5	6	7	8	9	10	Final
(Minnesota) Ethan Sampson	0	1	1	0	0	1	0	1	0	0	4
(Minnesota) Daniel Casper	0	0	0	0	1	0	2	0	0	2	5

=== Draw 7 ===
Friday, January 31, 2:00 pm

Sheet A	1	2	3	4	5	6	7	8	9	10	11	Final
(Minnesota) Ethan Sampson	0	0	0	0	0	1	0	1	0	3	0	5
(Minnesota) John Shuster	0	0	0	0	2	0	1	0	2	0	1	6

Sheet B	1	2	3	4	5	6	7	8	9	10	Final
(Minnesota) Korey Dropkin	0	0	1	0	2	0	X	X	X	X	3
(Minnesota) Daniel Casper	3	1	0	3	0	2	X	X	X	X	9

Sheet C	1	2	3	4	5	6	7	8	9	10	Final
(Pennsylvania) Scott Dunnam	0	4	0	1	0	1	0	1	0	1	8
(Minnesota) Wesley Wendling	2	0	1	0	3	0	0	0	0	0	6

Sheet D	1	2	3	4	5	6	7	8	9	10	Final
(Minnesota) Chase Sinnett	0	3	0	2	1	0	2	0	0	0	8
(North Dakota) Timothy Hodek	1	0	3	0	0	2	0	0	2	1	9

== Tiebreaker ==
Saturday, February 1, 7:30 am

Sheet C	1	2	3	4	5	6	7	8	9	10	Final
(Minnesota) Chase Sinnett	0	0	0	1	1	0	1	0	0	1	4
(Minnesota) Ethan Sampson	0	0	0	0	0	1	0	1	1	0	3

== Playoffs ==
Page playoff system
1	(Minnesota) Daniel Casper	7
2	(Minnesota) Korey Dropkin	4
3	(Minnesota) John Shuster	8
4	(Minnesota) Chase Sinnett	4

Semifinal
2	(Minnesota) Korey Dropkin	11
3	(Minnesota) John Shuster	3

Final
1	(Minnesota) Daniel Casper	6
2	(Minnesota) Korey Dropkin	8

=== 1 vs. 2 ===
Saturday, February 1, 12:00 pm

Sheet B	1	2	3	4	5	6	7	8	9	10	Final
(Minnesota) Daniel Casper	1	0	1	0	1	0	1	0	2	1	7
(Minnesota) Korey Dropkin	0	1	0	1	0	0	0	2	0	0	4

=== 3 vs. 4 ===
Saturday, February 1, 12:00 pm

Sheet A	1	2	3	4	5	6	7	8	9	10	Final
(Minnesota) John Shuster	2	0	1	0	0	3	0	2	X	X	8
(Minnesota) Chase Sinnett	0	0	0	2	1	0	1	0	X	X	4

=== Semifinal ===
Saturday, February 1, 7:00 pm

Sheet B	1	2	3	4	5	6	7	8	9	10	Final
(Minnesota) Korey Dropkin	0	4	0	0	3	0	2	2	X	X	11
(Minnesota) John Shuster	0	0	1	1	0	1	0	0	X	X	3

=== Final ===
Sunday, February 2, 12:00 pm

Sheet D	1	2	3	4	5	6	7	8	9	10	11	Final
(Minnesota) Daniel Casper	2	0	1	1	0	1	0	0	0	1	0	6
(Minnesota) Korey Dropkin	0	1	0	0	2	0	2	0	1	0	2	8

2025 United States Men's Curling Championship

Korey Dropkin
2nd United States Championship title
