= NY Dynamo =

- City: Clifton, New York
- League: United States Premier Hockey League; National Collegiate Development Conference (NCDC)
- Conference: New England
- Division: Central
- Founded: 2019
- Home arena: Capital Ice Arena
- Colors: Black, orange and white

Franchise history
- 2019–2025: Seacoast Spartans
- 2025–Present: NY Dynamo

The NY Dynamo are a Tier II junior ice hockey team playing in the United States Premier Hockey League's (USPHL) National Collegiate Development Conference (NCDC) division. The Dynamo play their home games at Capital Ice Arena in Clifton, New York. The NY Dynamo Premier team is United States Premier Hockey League team that plays out of the AC North Ice Rink in Plattsburgh, NY.

== History ==
In 2025, the New York Dynamo youth organization purchased a Tier II franchise from the Seacoast Spartans. The club's assets were relocated and set to begin play in the fall of 2025.

== Season-by-season records ==
Season	GP	W	L	OTL	SOL	Pts	GF	GA	Regular season finish	Playoffs
NCDC
2024–25	54	10	34	6	4	30	129	229	8th of 9, New England Div. 19th of 22, NCDC	Did not qualify
2025–26	54	20	32	1	1	42	153	203	5th of 6, New England Cent; 25th of 33, NCDC	Did not qualify
