= 2027 World Men's Curling Championship =

2027 edition of the World Men's Curling Championship

- Host city: Saint John, New Brunswick, Canada
- Arena: TD Station
- Dates: March 27 – April 4

The 2027 World Men's Curling Championship (68th) (branded as the 2027 BKT World Men's Curling Championship for sponsorship reasons) is scheduled to be held from March 27 to April 4 at the TD Station in Saint John, New Brunswick, Canada.

== Qualification ==
Eighteen curling federations qualified to participate in the 2027 World Men's Curling Championship. Twelve teams who took part in the 2026 edition already qualified. Six more teams qualified via the 16-team 2026 World Championship Qualifier Men tournament.

Means of Qualification	Vacancies	Qualified
Host Nation	1	Canada
2026 World Men's Curling Championship	11	Sweden; Scotland; United States; Switzerland; Italy; China; Japan; Germany; South Korea; Czech Republic; Poland
2026 World Championship Qualifier Men	6	Netherlands; Norway; Denmark; Philippines; Austria; Australia
TOTAL	18	
