= Mountain America Center =

Arena in Idaho Falls, Idaho, United States

- "The Mac" (nickname) Blue Cross of Idaho Conference Center (convention center)
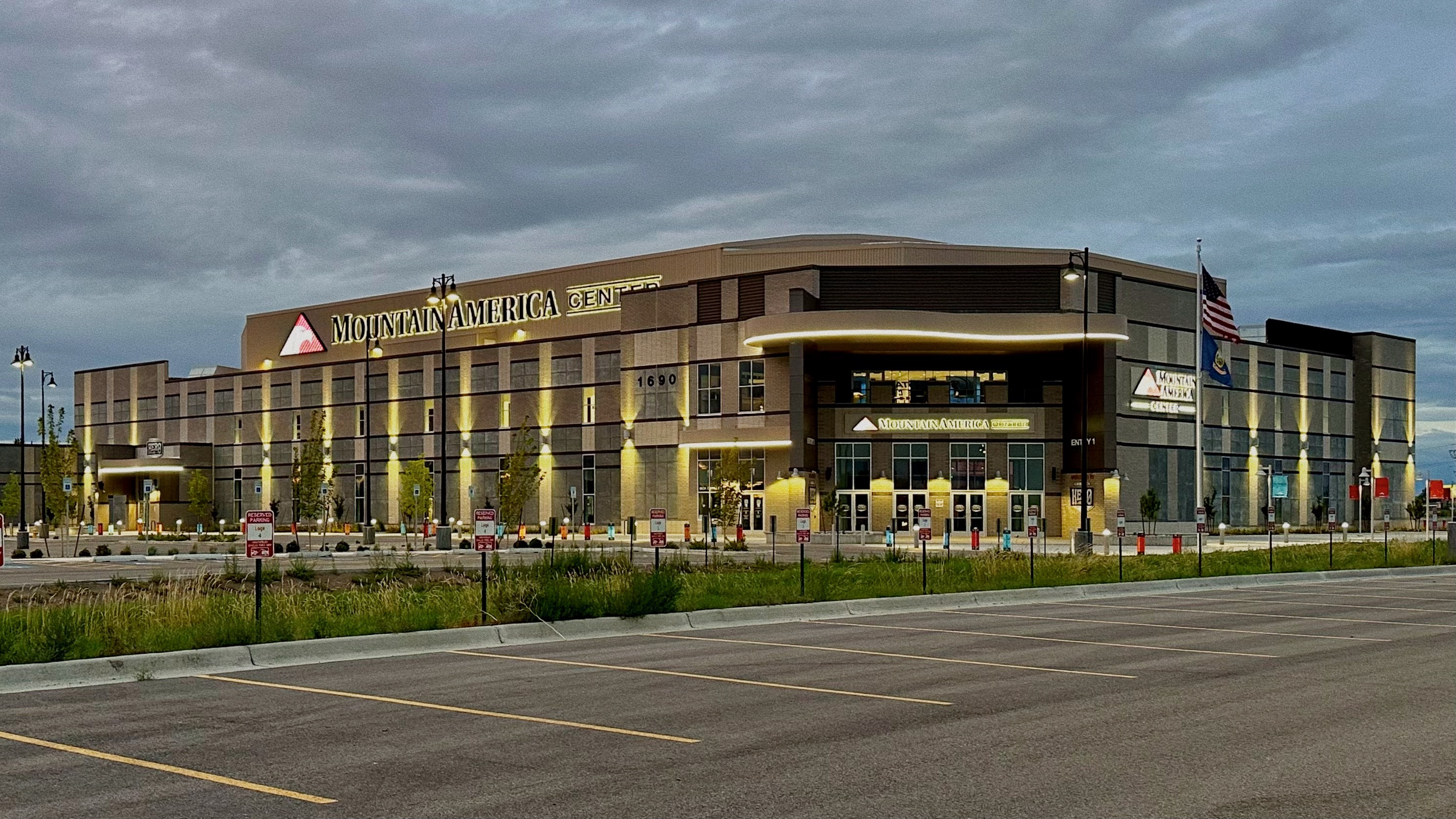
- Mountain America Center in September 2023
- Interactive map of Mountain America Center
- Former names: Hero Arena (2021-2024)
- Address: 1690 Event Center Drive; Idaho Falls, Idaho 83402
- Coordinates: 43.481179°N 112.065422°W
- Owner: Idaho Falls Auditorium District
- Operator: Centennial Management
- Capacity: up to 6,000
- Type: Multipurpose arena, convention center

Construction
- Groundbreaking: May 18, 2021
- Opened: November 28, 2022
- Cost: $62 million USD (2022)
- Architect: CRSA
- Project manager: Bateman-Hall

Tenant
- Idaho Falls Spud Kings (NAHL) (2022–present)

Website
- www.mountainamericacenter.com

The Mountain America Center is a multipurpose arena and convention center in Idaho Falls, Idaho. It opened to the public on November 28, 2022. The arena's seating capacity is 4,100 for ice hockey and up to 6,000 for concerts. The 11,000-square-foot conference space can accommodate up to 680 people.

== History ==
Serious planning for the venue that would become the Mountain America Center began around 2007, when the Greater Idaho Falls Chamber of Commerce commissioned a feasibility study for a multipurpose event center in the city of Idaho Falls. With the study providing a favorable outlook for such a facility, an exploratory process and public campaign began.

In May 2011, Idaho Falls voters authorized the creation of an auditorium district with the power to establish a 5% hotel tax, the proceeds of which would be used to fund the venue's construction.

In September 2015, the city of Idaho Falls annexed the land in the Snake River Landing development intended to serve as the future home of the events center. In February 2018, the auditorium district's governing board voted to accept the donation of 23 acres of land from owner Ball Ventures.

By 2019, the auditorium district had raised $11 million from the hotel tax. A naming rights partnership with Mountain America Credit Union was announced that year.

The official groundbreaking ceremony for the facility occurred on May 18, 2021, ten years after voters first authorized the creation of the auditorium district.

It opened to the public for the first time on November 28, 2022. Two days later, country music duo Big & Rich played the first concert at the venue on November 30, 2022.

The venue was an instant success, hosting approximately 170 events in its first year and selling over 275,000 tickets combined. Live entertainment industry trade publication Pollstar named the Mountain America Center a finalist for its New Concert Venue of the Year (Over 5,000 Capacity) award in November 2023.

=== Naming rights ===
==== Mountain America Credit Union ====
Naming rights for the overall facility, encompassing both the arena and the conference center, are held by Utah-based Mountain America Credit Union. The organization agreed to pay $4.5 million for the naming rights, covering a 30-year period. The agreement was announced on July 16, 2019.

==== Blue Cross of Idaho ====
Naming rights for the convention center portion of the venue are held by health insurance provider Blue Cross of Idaho, branding it as the Blue Cross of Idaho Conference Center. The agreement was announced on June 30, 2021 and covers a 20-year period. Financial terms were not publicly disclosed.

==== Golden Valley Natural ====
Naming rights for the arena portion of the venue were originally held by Idaho-based meat snacks manufacturer Golden Valley Natural, which branded the venue as Hero Arena after its Hero Snacks brand of beef jerky. Official advertisements for events at the venue would commonly brand them as taking place at the "Hero Arena inside the Mountain America Center." The agreement was announced on May 3, 2021, with the company agreeing to pay $2 million for the naming rights, covering a 20-year period. However, Golden Valley Natural was acquired by Western Smokehouse Partners in May 2024. With the acquisition, Eric Hudson, then-general manager of the Mountain America Center, told live entertainment industry trade publication VenuesNow that Mountain America Credit Union had elected to take over the naming rights for the arena, and official advertisements quietly stopped using the Hero Arena name by late 2024.

== Events ==
=== Ice hockey ===
The arena's primary tenant is the Idaho Falls Spud Kings, a junior ice hockey team. Since the 2026-27 season, the Spud Kings have played in the Tier II North American Hockey League.

The Spud Kings started their inaugural season with 25 straight road games while construction of their home arena was completed. The team played its first home game at the Mountain America Center on Dec. 2, 2022, a 6-1 loss to the then-Utah Outliers.

In April 2026, the venue hosted the Dineen Cup Championship, the annual four-team playoff tournament of the United States Premier Hockey League's National Collegiate Development Conference, the league in which the Spud Kings played at the time. It was the first venue outside of the U.S. east coast selected to host the event. The South Shore Kings won the tournament, beating the Grand Junction River Hawks 1-0 in the final game to secure the title.

=== Other events ===
In addition to ice hockey games, the venue hosts a variety of other athletic competitions, concerts, family shows, comedy acts, trade shows and community events. Notable touring acts that have played at the venue include musical acts spanning multiple genres like Tool, Brad Paisley, Judas Priest and "Weird Al" Yankovic; comedians Nate Bargatze and Gabriel Iglesias; and family shows like the Harlem Globetrotters and Disney on Ice.

The venue has partnered with the Idaho High School Activities Association to serve as a host for various Idaho state high school sports championships, including the State Volleyball Championships in 2024 and 2025 and the State Cheer and Dance Championships in 2026 and 2027.
