= Pueblo Bulls =

- City: Pueblo, Colorado
- League: United States Premier Hockey League; National Collegiate Development Conference
- Conference: Mountain
- Founded: 2019
- Home arena: Pueblo Ice Arena
- Colors: Black, red, yellow
- Owners: Jerry & Lorie Wilhite
- General manager: Tyler Tuneberg
- Head coach: Chris Wilhite
- Media: Around the Horns Network

The Pueblo Bulls are a junior ice hockey team in the United States Premier Hockey League (USPHL). The Bulls play their home games at the Pueblo Ice Arena beginning with the 2019–20 season.

== History ==
The Pueblo Bulls were announced by the Western States Hockey League (WSHL) as an expansion team on September 20, 2018. They began play in the 2019–20 season.

In 2020, the Bulls left the WSHL after one season and joined the United States Premier Hockey League (USPHL) Premier Division.

In 2023, the Bulls joined the USPHL's National Collegiate Development Conference (NCDC) Mountain division.

== Season-by-season records ==
Season	GP	W	L	OTW	OTL	Pts	GF	GA	PIM	Finish	Playoffs
WSHL Division
2019–20	51	25	13	7	6	95 (Note: The WSHL awards 3pts for a win, 2pts for an overtime win, and 1pt for an overtime loss.)	270	149	945	3rd of 7, Midwestern	Playoffs cancelled
USPHL Premier Division
2020–21	49	27	19	—	3	57	170	156	810	3rd of 5, Mountain; 22 of 62, USPHL-Premier	2–1–0 Mountain Division Round-Robin; W, 4–1 (Ogden Mustangs); L, 5–3 (Utah Outliers); OTW, 5–4 (Northern Colorado Eagles); Won Div. Semifinal game, 5–2 (Northern Colorado Eagles); Lost Div. Championship game, 3–5 (Utah Outliers)
2021–22	49	20	26	—	3	43	154	168	1024	4th of 5, Mountain; 44 of 64, Premier	Won Div. Qualifier round, 2–0 (Provo Riverblades); Lost Div. Semifinals, (Utah Outliers)
2022–23	52	24	25	2	1	51	195	187	814	3rd of 6, Mountain; 40 of 69, Premier	Won Div. Quarterfinals, 2–1 (Provo Predators); Lost Div. Semifinals, 1–2 (Ogden Mustangs)
USPHL NCDC Division
2023–24	53	25	25	2	1	53	194	178	742	5th of 6, Mountain; 11th of 18, NCDC	Did Not Qualify for Post Season
2024–25	53	32	20	1	0	65	171	156	854	4th of 6, Mountain; 9th of 22, NCDC	Lost Div. Semifinal, 2-3 (Idaho Falls Spud Kings)
