= Idaho Falls Spud Kings =

- City: Idaho Falls, Idaho
- League: North American Hockey League
- Division: Mountain
- Founded: 2022 (USPHL/NCDC)
- Home arena: Mountain America Center
- Colors: Red, gold, brown, purple
- Owner: Elmore Sports Group
- Head coach: Anthony Bohn

Franchise history
- 2022–present: Idaho Falls Spud Kings

Championships
- Division titles: 1: 2025
- Playoff championships: 1: 2025

The Idaho Falls Spud Kings are a Tier II junior ice hockey team playing in the North American Hockey League (NAHL). The Spud Kings play their home games at Mountain America Center in Idaho Falls, Idaho.

Before joining the NAHL, the Spud Kings played their first four seasons as a member of the United States Premier Hockey League's (USPHL) National Collegiate Development Conference (NCDC) division.

== History ==
The Idaho Falls Spud Kings were born when the USPHL approved the addition of a Tier III expansion team that would play out of the Mountain America Center on March 30, 2022, which was founded by Elmore Sports Group. Just a few months later, before the team had even hit the ice for its first game, the USPHL announced that it would be promoting its entire Mountain Division to Tier II. The Spud Kings lone season at the Tier III (Premier Division) level was predictable poor but, due to the expansive nature of the playoff system, they still managed to play their first postseason games, even managing to win their first round series.

Once the team joined the National Collegiate Development Conference, they showed steady improvement but the shot to the top in their third season. Idaho Falls won its first division title that year and then sloughed through the playoff until were the last team remaining. The Spud Kings downed the regular season champions, South Shore Kings, in the final to capture their first league championship.

On June 12, 2026, it was announced that the Spud Kings would leave the USPHL and NCDC to join the North American Hockey League for the 2026-27 season as one of five charter teams in its new Mountain Division.

== Season-by-season records ==
Season	GP	W	L	OTL	SOL	Pts	GF	GA	Regular season finish	Playoffs
Premier Division
2022–23	52	19	29	2	2	42	162	266	5th of 6, Mountain Div. 42nd of 70, Premier	Won Div. Quarterfinal series, 2–0 (Northern Colorado Eagles); Lost Div. Semifinal series, 0–2 (Utah Outliers)
NCDC Division
2023–24	53	24	23	4	2	54	150	172	4th of 6, Mountain Conf. t–9th of 18, NCDC	Lost Conf. Semifinal series, 1–3 (Ogden Mustangs)
2024–25	53	38	10	4	1	81	188	117	1st of 6, Mountain Div. 3rd of 22, NCDC	Won Div. Semifinal series, 3–2 (Pueblo Bulls); Won Div. Final series, 3–1 (Ogden Mustangs); Won Quarterfinal, 1–0 (OT) (South Shore Kings); Won Winners Semifinal, 1–0 (Mercer Chiefs); Won Championship, 2–1 (South Shore Kings)
