= Rock Springs Miners =

- City: Rock Springs, Wyoming
- League: United States Premier Hockey League; National Collegiate Development Conference (NCDC)
- Conference: West
- Division: Mountain
- Founded: 2022
- Home arena: Rock Springs Family Recreation Center
- Colors: black, gold and red
- General manager: John Gilchrist
- Head coach: Alex Miner

Franchise history
- 2022–2023: Rock Springs Prospectors
- 2023–2025: Rock Springs Grizzlies
- 2025–present: Rock Springs Miners

The Rock Springs Miners are a Tier II junior ice hockey team playing in the United States Premier Hockey League (USPHL) National Collegiate Development Conference (NCDC) division. The Miners play their home games at Rock Springs Family Recreation Center in the city of Rock Springs, Wyoming.

== History ==
In early 2022, the USPHL announced that it was forming a new Northwest Division for the Premier (Tier III) level. Among the new five teams was the Rock Springs Prospectors, who would hit the ice for the upcoming season. During its inaugural season, the team received fairly surprising news when it was promoted to the NCAC (Tier II) level for the following year. This happened because the Northern Colorado Eagles, one of six Mountain Division teams that was being promoted, had lost access to their home rink and would be folding at the end of the year. Wanting to have a six-team division, the USPHL swapped the Prospectors in for the Eagles.

After their first season, the franchise was sold and renamed as the Rock Springs Grizzlies. The team had two unsuccessful seasons before rebranding as the Rock Springs Miners prior to the start of the 2025–26 season.

== Season-by-season records ==
| Season | GP | W | L | OTL | SOL | Pts | GF | GA | Regular season finish | Playoffs |
|---|---|---|---|---|---|---|---|---|---|---|
Premier Division
Rock Springs Prospectors
| 2022–23 | 44 | 15 | 27 | 2 | 0 | 32 | 145 | 243 | 3rd of 5, Northwest Div. t–52nd of 70, Premier | Lost Div. Semifinal series, 1–2 (Seattle Totems) |
NCDC Division
Rock Springs Grizzlies
| 2023–24 | 53 | 9 | 39 | 4 | 1 | 23 | 116 | 233 | 6th of 6, Mountain Conf. 18th of 18, NCDC | Did not qualify |
| 2024–25 | 53 | 11 | 36 | 5 | 1 | 28 | 188 | 117 | 6th of 6, Mountain Div. 20th of 22, NCDC | Did not qualify |
Rock Springs Miners
| 2025–26 | 54 | 17 | 34 | 3 | 0 | 37 | 137 | 203 | 6th of 7, Mountain Div. 29th of 33, NCDC | Did not qualify |

== Former logos ==
Rock Springs Prospectors

Rock Springs Grizzlies
