= 2026 World Men's Curling Championship =

2026 edition of the World Men's Curling Championship

- Host city: Ogden, Utah, United States
- Arena: Weber County Ice Sheet
- Dates: March 27 – April 4
- Winner: Sweden
- Curling club: Karlstads CK, Karlstad
- Skip: Niklas Edin
- Third: Oskar Eriksson
- Second: Rasmus Wranå
- Lead: Christoffer Sundgren
- Alternate: Simon Olofsson
- Coach: Alexander Lindström
- Finalist: Canada (Dunstone)

The 2026 World Men's Curling Championship (67th) (branded as the 2026 LGT World Men's Curling Championship for sponsorship reasons) was held from March 27 to April 4 at the Weber County Ice Sheet in Ogden, Utah, United States. The venue previously hosted the curling events at the 2002 Winter Olympics.

The format for the Championship featured a thirteen team round robin. The top six teams qualified for the playoff round, where the top two teams received a bye while the remaining four played in the qualification round to qualify for the semifinals.

In the opening ceremonies, 2018 Olympic gold medalist John Shuster threw the ceremonial first stone toward Rhona Howie, who had won the gold medal in the women's event at the 2002 Olympics at the venue.

The event saw the debut for Poland, who also recorded their first ever win, an 11–4 victory over Germany in Draw 5.

== Qualification ==
Thirteen curling federations qualified to participate in the 2026 World Men's Curling Championship. This was the first World Men's Championship appearance for Poland, who qualified after finishing seventh at the European Championship.

Means of Qualification	Vacancies	Qualified
Host Nation	1	United States
2025 Pan Continental Curling Championships	4	Canada; Japan; China; South Korea
2025 European Curling Championships	8	Sweden; Switzerland; Scotland; Italy; Germany; Czech Republic; Poland; Norway
TOTAL	13	

== Teams ==
The teams were as follows:

Canada (Note: Geoff Walker was substituted as 2nd in the game of draw 14, and played as Lead in the game of draw 20.)	China (Note: Xu Xiaoming played as 3rd in the games of draws 15, 17, and 18, whilst the other three players — Li, Yung and Wang — alternated between the positions of Second, Lead, and Alternate.)	Czech Republic (Note: Vít Chabičovský played as 2nd in the game of draw 14, and as 3rd in the game of draw 19.)	Germany (Note: Mario Trevisiol was substituted as Lead in the game of draw 13.)	Italy
Granite CC, Winnipeg Skip: Matt Dunstone; Third: Colton Lott; Second: E. J. Harnden; Lead: Ryan Harnden; Alternate: Geoff Walker	CSO Curling Club, Beijing Skip: Fei Xueqing (Note: China has qualified for the World Championship as Team Xu Xiaoming. With no reasons provided, China played with regular 3rd Fei Xueqing as Skip; the other players, including the alternate, each moved up one position. The official name of the team — according to World Curling — remains Xu Xiaoming.); Third: Li Zhichao; Second: Yu Sen; Lead: Wang Zhenhao; Alternate: Xu Xiaoming	CC Zbraslav & CC Dion, Prague Skip: Lukáš Klíma; Third: Marek Černovský; Second: Martin Jurík; Lead: Lukáš Klípa; Alternate: Vít Chabičovský	CC Füssen, Füssen Skip: Marc Muskatewitz; Third: Benjamin Kapp; Second: Felix Messenzehl; Lead: Johannes Scheuerl; Alternate: Mario Trevisiol	Trentino CC & Cembra CC, Cembra Skip: ~~Joël Retornaz~~ Stefano Spiller (Note: Italy has qualified for the World Championships as Team Joel Retornaz. For personal reasons, Retornaz decided not to compete with the national team at this World Championship. In his place, the 2025 Junior World Champion, Stefano Spiller, skipped the team.); Third: Amos Mosaner; Second: Sebastiano Arman; Lead: Alberto Pimpini (Note: Following the change in the Skip position, Alternate Alberto Pimpini replaced regular Lead Mattia Giovanella, who took on the role of Alternate.); Alternate: Mattia Giovanella
Japan (Note: Due to an injury, Takeru Yamamoto only played in the games of draw 1, 2, 5, 6 and 10, Shingo Usui as 2nd replaced Yamamoto in the last 6 games; Japan was forced to play the game in draw 8 with only 3 players.)	Norway (Note: Magnus Ramsfjell played as the skipping 4th in the games of draw 9, 11, 12 and 20, as 3rd in the games of draw 14 and 17; Mathias Brænden sat out the game of draw 12; Michael Mellemseter sat out the games of draw 11 and 19; Andreas Hårstad sat out the games of draw 9 and 20, moved to 2nd in the game of draw 11 and to Lead in the game of draw 12.)	Poland (Note: Maksym Grzelka played as 2nd in the games of draw 7 and 17 for Bartosz Łobaza whilst Marcin Ciemiński moved to Lead, and of the draw 9, 10, 15.)	Scotland (Note: Duncan McFadzean was substituted as Lead in the games of draw 7 and 20, as 2nd in the games of draw 10 and 14.)	South Korea
SC Karuizawa Club, Karuizawa Fourth: Riku Yanagisawa; Skip: Tsuyoshi Yamaguchi; Second: Takeru Yamamoto; Lead: Satoshi Koizumi; Alternate: Shingo Usui	Oppdal CK, Oppdal Skip: Andreas Hårstad; Third: Wilhelm Næss; Second: Michael Mellemseter; Lead: Mathias Brænden; Alternate: Magnus Ramsfjell	Wałbrzych CC, Wałbrzych Skip: Konrad Stych; Third: Krzysztof Domin; Second: Marcin Ciemiński; Lead: Bartosz Łobaza; Alternate: Maksym Grzelka	The Peak, Stirling Skip: Ross Whyte; Third: Robin Brydone; Second: Craig Waddell; Lead: Euan Kyle; Alternate: Duncan McFadzean	Uiseong CC, Uiseong ~~Fourth: Kim Soo-hyuk~~ (Note: Kim Soo-hyuk had to refrain from participating due to an undisclosed injury); Skip: Kim Chang-min; Second: Yoo Min-hyeon; Lead: Jeon Jae-ik
Sweden (Note: Simon Olofsson played as 2nd in the game of draw 4, and as Lead in the games of draw 9, 14 and 16; he was also substituted as Lead in the game of draw 19.)	Switzerland (Note: Jan Hess was substituted as Lead in the 6th and last end in the game of draw 16.)	United States (Note: Aidan Oldenburg played as Lead in the games of draw 12 for Matt Hamilton, and 15 for Colin Hufman whilst Hamilton moved to 2nd.)		
Karlstads CK, Karlstad Skip: Niklas Edin; Third: Oskar Eriksson; Second: Rasmus Wranå; Lead: Christoffer Sundgren; Alternate: Simon Olofsson	CC Glarus, Glarus Fourth: Philipp Hösli; Skip: Marco Hösli; Second: Simon Gloor; Lead: Justin Hausherr; Alternate: Jan Hess	Duluth CC, Duluth Skip: John Shuster; Third: Chris Plys; Second: Colin Hufman; Lead: Matt Hamilton; Alternate: Aidan Oldenburg		

=== World Curling ranking ===
Year-to-date World Curling ranking for each team prior to the event.

Nation (Skip)	Rank	Points
Canada (Dunstone)	4	372.8
Scotland (Whyte)	5	349.0
Italy (Retornaz)	7	271.1
United States (Shuster)	8	259.0
China (Xu)	12	208.2
Sweden (Edin)	13	200.9
Japan (Yamaguchi)	16	172.6
Switzerland (Hösli)	18	165.4
Germany (Muskatewitz)	20	148.6
Czech Republic (Klíma)	28	133.1
South Korea (Kim)	40	97.5
Norway (Hårstad)	49	79.5
Poland (Stych)	90	27.4

== Round robin standings ==
Final Round Robin Standings

Key
Teams to Playoffs
Team Relegated to 2026 World Championship Qualifier

Country	Skip	W	L	W–L	PF	PA	EW	EL	BE	SE	S%	DSC
Sweden	Niklas Edin	10	2	1–1	88	51	47	33	6	14	88.7%	14.445
Scotland	Ross Whyte	10	2	1–1	88	45	47	36	7	10	89.0%	23.959
Canada	Matt Dunstone	10	2	1–1	88	52	48	35	6	16	88.6%	30.777
Switzerland	Marco Hösli	9	3	–	89	62	54	40	3	18	88.3%	29.673
United States	John Shuster	8	4	1–0	84	71	47	48	8	5	85.8%	29.355
Italy	Stefano Spiller	8	4	0–1	74	66	44	38	18	12	86.6%	19.673
China	Xu Xiaoming	6	6	–	68	79	45	45	10	7	82.7%	20.545
Japan	Tsuyoshi Yamaguchi	5	7	–	70	71	44	44	6	12	85.6%	30.482
Germany	Marc Muskatewitz	4	8	–	64	93	45	47	4	7	80.6%	22.109
South Korea	Kim Chang-min	3	9	1–0	58	86	38	51	8	1	80.7%	31.909
Czech Republic	Lukáš Klíma	3	9	0–1	68	91	43	56	5	7	80.4%	37.614
Poland	Konrad Stych	2	10	–	57	94	36	52	7	6	77.1%	56.782
Norway	Andreas Hårstad	0	12	–	57	92	43	56	11	7	80.3%	25.355

Round Robin Summary Table
Pos.	Country	Canada	China	Czech Republic	Germany	Italy	Japan	Norway	Poland	Scotland	South Korea	Sweden	Switzerland	United States	Record
3	Canada	—	8–4	9–5	9–2	9–2	8–3	7–5	9–2	3–8	5–2	10–3	8–7	3–9	10–2
7	China	4–8	—	8–7	9–5	4–7	8–7	9–4	6–5	3–9	8–4	2–9	2–8	5–6	6–6
10	Czech Republic	5–9	7–8	—	7–8	4–6	7–6	6–5	10–6	2–8	6–7	2–11	7–9	5–8	3–9
9	Germany	2–9	5–9	8–7	—	5–7	4–10	7–6	4–11	4–10	6–4	3–8	6–7	10–5	4–8
6	Italy	2–9	7–4	6–4	7–5	—	6–4	7–4	8–4	3–9	9–4	4–9	7–1	8–9	8–4
8	Japan	3–8	7–8	6–7	10–4	4–6	—	6–4	10–2	7–5	9–3	3–7	3–8	2–9	5–7
13	Norway	5–7	4–9	5–6	6–7	4–7	4–6	—	5–8	5–7	7–9	4–9	1–8	7–9	0–12
12	Poland	2–9	5–6	6–10	11–4	4–8	2–10	8–5	—	2–7	4–7	1–9	9–11	3–8	2–10
2	Scotland	8–3	9–3	8–2	10–4	9–3	5–7	7–5	7–2	—	7–2	5–6	7–4	6–4	10–2
11	South Korea	2–5	4–8	7–6	4–6	4–9	3–9	9–7	7–4	2–7	—	6–7	2–9	8–9	3–9
1	Sweden	3–10	9–2	11–2	8–3	9–4	7–3	9–4	9–1	6–5	7–6	—	5–8	5–3	10–2
4	Switzerland	7–8	8–2	9–7	7–6	1–7	8–3	8–1	11–9	4–7	9–2	8–5	—	9–5	9–3
5	United States	9–3	6–5	8–5	5–10	9–8	9–2	9–7	8–3	4–6	9–8	3–5	5–9	—	8–4

== Round robin results ==
All draw times are listed in Mountain Time (UTC−06:00).

=== Draw 1 ===
Friday, March 27, 1:30 pm

Sheet A	1	2	3	4	5	6	7	8	9	10	Final
Scotland (Whyte)	0	3	0	0	1	0	0	1	0	0	5
Sweden (Edin) 🔨	2	0	1	1	0	1	0	0	0	1	6

Sheet B	1	2	3	4	5	6	7	8	9	10	Final
South Korea (Kim)	0	0	0	1	0	1	0	0	0	X	2
Canada (Dunstone) 🔨	0	1	0	0	1	0	0	2	1	X	5

Sheet C	1	2	3	4	5	6	7	8	9	10	Final
Czech Republic (Klíma) 🔨	0	2	0	1	0	0	2	0	2	0	7
China (Xu)	0	0	1	0	0	4	0	1	0	2	8

Sheet D	1	2	3	4	5	6	7	8	9	10	Final
Norway (Hårstad) 🔨	1	0	0	0	0	0	2	0	0	1	4
Japan (Yamaguchi)	0	2	0	1	0	1	0	0	2	0	6

=== Draw 2 ===
Friday, March 27, 7:00 pm

Sheet A	1	2	3	4	5	6	7	8	9	10	Final
Poland (Stych)	0	0	1	0	3	4	0	1	0	X	9
Switzerland (Hösli) 🔨	1	2	0	2	0	0	4	0	2	X	11

Sheet B	1	2	3	4	5	6	7	8	9	10	Final
Scotland (Whyte)	0	1	0	0	2	0	0	2	0	0	5
Japan (Yamaguchi) 🔨	1	0	1	1	0	0	2	0	0	2	7

Sheet C	1	2	3	4	5	6	7	8	9	10	Final
Germany (Muskatewitz) 🔨	0	4	0	1	0	2	0	2	1	X	10
United States (Shuster)	0	0	2	0	2	0	1	0	0	X	5

Sheet D	1	2	3	4	5	6	7	8	9	10	Final
Italy (Spiller) 🔨	0	0	0	0	2	0	X	X	X	X	2
Canada (Dunstone)	0	1	3	3	0	2	X	X	X	X	9

=== Draw 3 ===
Saturday, March 28, 9:00 am

Sheet A	1	2	3	4	5	6	7	8	9	10	Final
United States (Shuster) 🔨	1	0	3	0	1	0	2	0	2	0	9
South Korea (Kim)	0	2	0	2	0	2	0	1	0	1	8

Sheet B	1	2	3	4	5	6	7	8	9	10	Final
Switzerland (Hösli)	1	1	1	0	1	1	0	3	X	X	8
Norway (Hårstad) 🔨	0	0	0	0	0	0	1	0	X	X	1

Sheet C	1	2	3	4	5	6	7	8	9	10	Final
Sweden (Edin) 🔨	0	1	0	3	1	0	0	0	4	X	9
Italy (Spiller)	0	0	2	0	0	0	1	1	0	X	4

Sheet D	1	2	3	4	5	6	7	8	9	10	11	Final
Germany (Muskatewitz)	0	2	0	1	1	0	1	2	0	0	1	8
Czech Republic (Klíma) 🔨	1	0	3	0	0	2	0	0	0	1	0	7

=== Draw 4 ===
Saturday, March 28, 2:00 pm

Sheet A	1	2	3	4	5	6	7	8	9	10	Final
Norway (Hårstad) 🔨	1	1	0	1	1	1	0	0	0	0	5
Czech Republic (Klíma)	0	0	2	0	0	0	1	1	1	1	6

Sheet B	1	2	3	4	5	6	7	8	9	10	Final
China (Xu) 🔨	1	0	1	0	0	0	X	X	X	X	2
Sweden (Edin)	0	3	0	5	0	1	X	X	X	X	9

Sheet C	1	2	3	4	5	6	7	8	9	10	Final
Canada (Dunstone)	0	0	0	2	0	1	0	X	X	X	3
Scotland (Whyte) 🔨	2	1	1	0	3	0	1	X	X	X	8

Sheet D	1	2	3	4	5	6	7	8	9	10	Final
South Korea (Kim) 🔨	0	1	0	0	0	2	0	2	0	2	7
Poland (Stych)	0	0	0	0	1	0	1	0	2	0	4

=== Draw 5 ===
Saturday, March 28, 7:00 pm

Sheet A	1	2	3	4	5	6	7	8	9	10	Final
Italy (Spiller) 🔨	2	0	0	1	0	0	0	3	1	X	7
China (Xu)	0	2	0	0	1	0	1	0	0	X	4

Sheet B	1	2	3	4	5	6	7	8	9	10	Final
Poland (Stych)	2	0	1	0	0	4	0	4	X	X	11
Germany (Muskatewitz) 🔨	0	1	0	0	1	0	2	0	X	X	4

Sheet C	1	2	3	4	5	6	7	8	9	10	Final
Japan (Yamaguchi)	0	0	1	0	2	0	0	0	0	X	3
Switzerland (Hösli) 🔨	2	0	0	1	0	1	0	1	3	X	8

Sheet D	1	2	3	4	5	6	7	8	9	10	Final
United States (Shuster)	0	2	0	0	0	0	1	0	1	0	4
Scotland (Whyte) 🔨	2	0	0	2	0	0	0	1	0	1	6

=== Draw 6 ===
Sunday, March 29, 9:00 am

Sheet A	1	2	3	4	5	6	7	8	9	10	Final
Sweden (Edin) 🔨	0	0	1	0	1	0	3	0	2	X	7
Japan (Yamaguchi)	0	0	0	1	0	1	0	1	0	X	3

Sheet B	1	2	3	4	5	6	7	8	9	10	11	Final
Czech Republic (Klíma)	1	0	0	0	2	0	1	0	0	2	0	6
South Korea (Kim) 🔨	0	0	0	2	0	3	0	1	0	0	1	7

Sheet C	1	2	3	4	5	6	7	8	9	10	Final
Italy (Spiller)	2	1	0	0	0	0	0	2	0	2	7
Germany (Muskatewitz) 🔨	0	0	2	1	0	0	1	0	1	0	5

=== Draw 7 ===
Sunday, March 29, 2:00 pm

Sheet A	1	2	3	4	5	6	7	8	9	10	11	Final
Czech Republic (Klíma)	0	0	2	0	1	0	1	0	0	3	0	7
Switzerland (Hösli) 🔨	2	1	0	1	0	2	0	0	1	0	2	9

Sheet B	1	2	3	4	5	6	7	8	9	10	Final
Canada (Dunstone)	0	1	0	1	0	1	0	X	X	X	3
United States (Shuster) 🔨	2	0	2	0	4	0	1	X	X	X	9

Sheet C	1	2	3	4	5	6	7	8	9	10	Final
Scotland (Whyte) 🔨	2	2	0	0	3	0	0	X	X	X	7
Poland (Stych)	0	0	0	1	0	0	1	X	X	X	2

Sheet D	1	2	3	4	5	6	7	8	9	10	Final
China (Xu) 🔨	0	1	1	0	1	0	2	0	4	X	9
Norway (Hårstad)	0	0	0	1	0	1	0	2	0	X	4

=== Draw 8 ===
Sunday, March 29, 7:00 pm

Sheet A	1	2	3	4	5	6	7	8	9	10	Final
Germany (Muskatewitz)	0	1	0	0	1	0	0	3	0	1	6
South Korea (Kim) 🔨	0	0	1	0	0	1	0	0	2	0	4

Sheet B	1	2	3	4	5	6	7	8	9	10	Final
Japan (Yamaguchi)	1	0	0	3	0	1	0	0	2	0	7
China (Xu) 🔨	0	2	1	0	2	0	0	2	0	1	8

Sheet C	1	2	3	4	5	6	7	8	9	10	Final
United States (Shuster)	0	0	0	0	3	0	0	0	0	X	3
Sweden (Edin) 🔨	0	2	1	0	0	1	0	0	1	X	5

Sheet D	1	2	3	4	5	6	7	8	9	10	Final
Switzerland (Hösli)	0	0	0	0	1	0	0	X	X	X	1
Italy (Spiller) 🔨	0	0	2	1	0	0	4	X	X	X	7

=== Draw 9 ===
Monday, March 30, 9:00 am

Sheet B	1	2	3	4	5	6	7	8	9	10	11	Final
South Korea (Kim) 🔨	0	2	0	0	2	0	0	1	0	1	0	6
Sweden (Edin)	0	0	1	1	0	2	0	0	2	0	1	7

Sheet C	1	2	3	4	5	6	7	8	9	10	Final
Norway (Ramsfjell) 🔨	0	1	0	1	0	0	2	0	2	0	6
Germany (Muskatewitz)	0	0	1	0	2	1	0	1	0	2	7

Sheet D	1	2	3	4	5	6	7	8	9	10	Final
Poland (Stych)	0	0	0	2	0	0	0	X	X	X	2
Canada (Dunstone) 🔨	0	2	0	0	2	3	2	X	X	X	9

=== Draw 10 ===
Monday, March 30, 2:00 pm

Sheet A	1	2	3	4	5	6	7	8	9	10	Final
Switzerland (Hösli) 🔨	0	2	0	2	1	1	0	2	X	X	8
China (Xu)	0	0	1	0	0	0	1	0	X	X	2

Sheet B	1	2	3	4	5	6	7	8	9	10	Final
Italy (Spiller)	0	0	2	0	1	0	X	X	X	X	3
Scotland (Whyte) 🔨	0	3	0	5	0	1	X	X	X	X	9

Sheet C	1	2	3	4	5	6	7	8	9	10	Final
Poland (Stych)	1	0	1	0	1	0	2	1	0	0	6
Czech Republic (Klíma) 🔨	0	1	0	2	0	2	0	0	2	3	10

Sheet D	1	2	3	4	5	6	7	8	9	10	Final
Japan (Yamaguchi)	0	1	1	0	0	0	X	X	X	X	2
United States (Shuster) 🔨	3	0	0	0	4	2	X	X	X	X	9

=== Draw 11 ===
Monday, March 30, 7:00 pm

Sheet A	1	2	3	4	5	6	7	8	9	10	Final
Canada (Dunstone) 🔨	0	2	0	0	1	0	4	1	X	X	8
Japan (Yamaguchi)	1	0	1	0	0	1	0	0	X	X	3

Sheet B	1	2	3	4	5	6	7	8	9	10	Final
Germany (Muskatewitz) 🔨	1	0	1	0	2	0	1	0	1	0	6
Switzerland (Hösli)	0	2	0	2	0	1	0	1	0	1	7

Sheet C	1	2	3	4	5	6	7	8	9	10	Final
South Korea (Kim)	0	0	0	1	0	3	0	X	X	X	4
Italy (Spiller) 🔨	0	2	1	0	3	0	3	X	X	X	9

Sheet D	1	2	3	4	5	6	7	8	9	10	Final
Sweden (Edin) 🔨	0	1	1	0	2	0	2	0	3	X	9
Norway (Ramsfjell)	0	0	0	0	0	3	0	1	0	X	4

=== Draw 12 ===
Tuesday, March 31, 9:00 am

Sheet A	1	2	3	4	5	6	7	8	9	10	Final
United States (Shuster) 🔨	1	2	0	3	0	1	0	0	1	X	8
Czech Republic (Klíma)	0	0	1	0	3	0	1	0	0	X	5

Sheet B	1	2	3	4	5	6	7	8	9	10	Final
Norway (Ramsfjell)	0	1	1	0	1	0	0	0	2	0	5
Poland (Stych) 🔨	2	0	0	3	0	0	1	0	0	2	8

Sheet C	1	2	3	4	5	6	7	8	9	10	Final
China (Xu) 🔨	1	0	0	2	0	1	0	0	0	X	4
Canada (Dunstone)	0	2	1	0	1	0	0	0	4	X	8

Sheet D	1	2	3	4	5	6	7	8	9	10	Final
Scotland (Whyte) 🔨	2	0	2	0	0	2	1	X	X	X	7
South Korea (Kim)	0	1	0	0	1	0	0	X	X	X	2

=== Draw 13 ===
Tuesday, March 31, 2:00 pm

Sheet A	1	2	3	4	5	6	7	8	9	10	Final
Italy (Spiller) 🔨	0	2	0	1	0	0	1	2	0	2	8
Poland (Stych)	0	0	1	0	1	0	0	0	2	0	4

Sheet B	1	2	3	4	5	6	7	8	9	10	11	Final
United States (Shuster)	0	0	3	0	0	1	0	1	0	0	1	6
China (Xu) 🔨	0	1	0	1	1	0	1	0	0	1	0	5

Sheet C	1	2	3	4	5	6	7	8	9	10	Final
Switzerland (Hösli)	0	2	1	0	1	1	0	2	1	X	8
Sweden (Edin) 🔨	1	0	0	3	0	0	1	0	0	X	5

Sheet D	1	2	3	4	5	6	7	8	9	10	Final
Japan (Yamaguchi) 🔨	2	0	2	0	4	0	2	X	X	X	10
Germany (Muskatewitz)	0	1	0	2	0	1	0	X	X	X	4

=== Draw 14 ===
Tuesday, March 31, 7:00 pm

Sheet A	1	2	3	4	5	6	7	8	9	10	Final
South Korea (Kim)	0	3	0	0	1	0	3	1	0	1	9
Norway (Hårstad) 🔨	1	0	1	1	0	2	0	0	2	0	7

Sheet B	1	2	3	4	5	6	7	8	9	10	Final
Sweden (Edin) 🔨	0	1	0	1	0	1	X	X	X	X	3
Canada (Dunstone)	4	0	2	0	4	0	X	X	X	X	10

Sheet C	1	2	3	4	5	6	7	8	9	10	Final
Germany (Muskatewitz) 🔨	1	0	1	0	0	2	0	X	X	X	4
Scotland (Whyte)	0	3	0	2	3	0	2	X	X	X	10

Sheet D	1	2	3	4	5	6	7	8	9	10	Final
Czech Republic (Klíma)	0	0	0	0	3	0	0	1	0	0	4
Italy (Spiller) 🔨	0	0	0	2	0	1	2	0	0	1	6

=== Draw 15 ===
Wednesday, April 1, 9:00 am

Sheet A	1	2	3	4	5	6	7	8	9	10	Final
China (Xu) 🔨	0	1	0	0	1	0	1	0	0	X	3
Scotland (Whyte)	1	0	1	1	0	5	0	0	1	X	9

Sheet B	1	2	3	4	5	6	7	8	9	10	11	Final
Japan (Yamaguchi) 🔨	1	0	0	0	2	0	2	0	0	1	0	6
Czech Republic (Klíma)	0	2	0	1	0	0	0	2	1	0	1	7

Sheet C	1	2	3	4	5	6	7	8	9	10	Final
Poland (Stych) 🔨	1	0	0	0	1	0	1	0	0	X	3
United States (Shuster)	0	1	1	2	0	2	0	1	1	X	8

Sheet D	1	2	3	4	5	6	7	8	9	10	Final
Canada (Dunstone) 🔨	2	1	0	1	0	2	0	1	0	1	8
Switzerland (Hösli)	0	0	1	0	2	0	1	0	3	0	7

=== Draw 16 ===
Wednesday, April 1, 2:00 pm

Sheet A	1	2	3	4	5	6	7	8	9	10	Final
Sweden (Edin)	0	4	2	0	2	0	X	X	X	X	8
Germany (Muskatewitz) 🔨	1	0	0	1	0	1	X	X	X	X	3

Sheet B	1	2	3	4	5	6	7	8	9	10	Final
Switzerland (Hösli)	1	1	0	2	5	0	X	X	X	X	9
South Korea (Kim) 🔨	0	0	1	0	0	1	X	X	X	X	2

Sheet C	1	2	3	4	5	6	7	8	9	10	Final
Italy (Spiller) 🔨	0	2	0	0	1	0	1	1	0	1	6
Japan (Yamaguchi)	0	0	1	1	0	1	0	0	1	0	4

Sheet D	1	2	3	4	5	6	7	8	9	10	11	Final
Norway (Hårstad) 🔨	1	0	2	0	2	0	1	0	0	1	0	7
United States (Shuster)	0	2	0	2	0	2	0	1	0	0	2	9

=== Draw 17 ===
Wednesday, April 1, 7:00 pm

Sheet A	1	2	3	4	5	6	7	8	9	10	Final
Czech Republic (Klíma) 🔨	0	0	2	0	0	1	0	2	0	X	5
Canada (Dunstone)	1	1	0	1	2	0	1	0	3	X	9

Sheet B	1	2	3	4	5	6	7	8	9	10	Final
Scotland (Whyte) 🔨	2	0	2	0	0	1	0	2	0	X	7
Norway (Hårstad)	0	1	0	2	0	0	1	0	1	X	5

Sheet C	1	2	3	4	5	6	7	8	9	10	Final
China (Xu) 🔨	2	1	0	2	0	1	0	2	X	X	8
South Korea (Kim)	0	0	1	0	1	0	2	0	X	X	4

Sheet D	1	2	3	4	5	6	7	8	9	10	Final
Poland (Stych) 🔨	0	0	0	0	1	0	X	X	X	X	1
Sweden (Edin)	1	1	3	2	0	2	X	X	X	X	9

=== Draw 18 ===
Thursday, April 2, 9:00 am

Sheet A	1	2	3	4	5	6	7	8	9	10	Final
Japan (Yamaguchi) 🔨	3	2	0	1	0	1	3	X	X	X	10
Poland (Stych)	0	0	1	0	1	0	0	X	X	X	2

Sheet B	1	2	3	4	5	6	7	8	9	10	Final
United States (Shuster) 🔨	2	0	4	0	0	1	0	1	0	1	9
Italy (Spiller)	0	1	0	1	1	0	3	0	2	0	8

Sheet C	1	2	3	4	5	6	7	8	9	10	Final
Scotland (Whyte)	0	2	0	1	1	0	0	0	1	2	7
Switzerland (Hösli) 🔨	1	0	1	0	0	2	0	0	0	0	4

Sheet D	1	2	3	4	5	6	7	8	9	10	Final
Germany (Muskatewitz)	0	0	2	0	3	0	0	0	0	X	5
China (Xu) 🔨	2	3	0	1	0	0	0	2	1	X	9

=== Draw 19 ===
Thursday, April 2, 2:00 pm

Sheet A	1	2	3	4	5	6	7	8	9	10	Final
Norway (Hårstad)	0	0	0	1	2	0	0	0	1	X	4
Italy (Spiller) 🔨	0	1	0	0	0	2	3	1	0	X	7

Sheet B	1	2	3	4	5	6	7	8	9	10	Final
Canada (Dunstone) 🔨	2	0	3	1	3	0	X	X	X	X	9
Germany (Muskatewitz)	0	1	0	0	0	1	X	X	X	X	2

Sheet C	1	2	3	4	5	6	7	8	9	10	Final
Sweden (Edin) 🔨	2	0	2	0	7	0	X	X	X	X	11
Czech Republic (Klíma)	0	0	0	1	0	1	X	X	X	X	2

Sheet D	1	2	3	4	5	6	7	8	9	10	Final
South Korea (Kim) 🔨	0	1	0	0	2	0	X	X	X	X	3
Japan (Yamaguchi)	3	0	3	1	0	2	X	X	X	X	9

=== Draw 20 ===
Thursday, April 2, 7:00 pm

Sheet A	1	2	3	4	5	6	7	8	9	10	Final
Switzerland (Hösli)	0	1	2	0	0	2	0	0	4	X	9
United States (Shuster) 🔨	2	0	0	2	0	0	0	1	0	X	5

Sheet B	1	2	3	4	5	6	7	8	9	10	Final
China (Xu) 🔨	0	0	2	0	0	2	0	0	0	2	6
Poland (Stych)	0	1	0	2	1	0	0	1	0	0	5

Sheet C	1	2	3	4	5	6	7	8	9	10	11	Final
Canada (Dunstone)	0	0	0	2	0	2	1	0	0	0	2	7
Norway (Ramsfjell) 🔨	0	0	1	0	1	0	0	0	2	1	0	5

Sheet D	1	2	3	4	5	6	7	8	9	10	Final
Czech Republic (Klíma)	0	1	0	1	0	0	X	X	X	X	2
Scotland (Whyte) 🔨	1	0	5	0	1	1	X	X	X	X	8

== Playoffs ==
Qualification games
4	Switzerland	8
5	United States	9
3	Canada	9
6	Italy	7

Semifinals
1	Sweden	8
5	United States	6
2	Scotland	7
3	Canada	9

Final
1	Sweden	9
3	Canada	6
Bronze medal game
5	United States	6
2	Scotland	11

=== Qualification Games ===
Friday, April 3, 9:00 am

Sheet B	1	2	3	4	5	6	7	8	9	10	11	Final
Switzerland (Hösli) 🔨	1	0	2	0	0	3	0	0	2	0	0	8
United States (Shuster)	0	1	0	2	0	0	2	2	0	1	1	9

Player percentages
Switzerland		United States	
Justin Hausherr	94%	Matt Hamilton	86%
Simon Gloor	94%	Colin Hufman	81%
Marco Hösli	84%	Chris Plys	82%
Philipp Hösli	74%	John Shuster	85%
Total	87%	Total	84%

Sheet D	1	2	3	4	5	6	7	8	9	10	Final
Canada (Dunstone) 🔨	0	1	0	1	0	2	0	2	0	3	9
Italy (Spiller)	0	0	3	0	1	0	2	0	1	0	7

Player percentages
Canada		Italy	
Ryan Harnden	93%	Alberto Pimpini	89%
E. J. Harnden	86%	Sebastiano Arman	88%
Colton Lott	81%	Amos Mosaner	85%
Matt Dunstone	78%	Stefano Spiller	83%
Total	84%	Total	86%

=== Semifinals ===
Friday, April 3, 3:00 pm

Sheet B	1	2	3	4	5	6	7	8	9	10	Final
Scotland (Whyte) 🔨	2	0	0	1	0	2	0	2	0	0	7
Canada (Dunstone)	0	0	2	0	1	0	3	0	2	1	9

Player percentages
Scotland		Canada	
Euan Kyle	95%	Ryan Harnden	91%
Craig Waddell	85%	E. J. Harnden	84%
Robin Brydone	88%	Colton Lott	83%
Ross Whyte	69%	Matt Dunstone	89%
Total	84%	Total	87%

Sheet D	1	2	3	4	5	6	7	8	9	10	11	Final
Sweden (Edin) 🔨	0	2	0	1	0	2	0	1	0	0	2	8
United States (Shuster)	0	0	2	0	1	0	1	0	1	1	0	6

Player percentages
Sweden		United States	
Christoffer Sundgren	94%	Matt Hamilton	93%
Rasmus Wranå	91%	Colin Hufman	95%
Oskar Eriksson	90%	Chris Plys	82%
Niklas Edin	76%	John Shuster	73%
Total	88%	Total	86%

=== Bronze medal game ===
Saturday, April 4, 9:00 am

Sheet C	1	2	3	4	5	6	7	8	9	10	Final
United States (Shuster)	0	2	0	2	1	0	0	1	0	X	6
Scotland (Whyte) 🔨	3	0	2	0	0	0	2	0	4	X	11

Player percentages
United States		Scotland	
Matt Hamilton	93%	Euan Kyle	92%
Colin Hufman	67%	Craig Waddell	89%
Chris Plys	82%	Robin Brydone	92%
John Shuster	76%	Ross Whyte	76%
Total	80%	Total	87%

=== Final ===
Saturday, April 4, 2:00 pm

Sheet C	1	2	3	4	5	6	7	8	9	10	Final
Sweden (Edin) 🔨	2	0	2	0	0	2	0	2	0	1	9
Canada (Dunstone)	0	1	0	0	2	0	2	0	1	0	6

Player percentages
Sweden		Canada	
Christoffer Sundgren	99%	Ryan Harnden	98%
Rasmus Wranå	79%	E. J. Harnden	83%
Oskar Eriksson	89%	Colton Lott	89%
Niklas Edin	95%	Matt Dunstone	78%
Total	91%	Total	87%

== Statistics ==
=== Top 5 player percentages ===
Final Round Robin Percentages

Key
All-Star Team

Leads	%
(Sweden) Christoffer Sundgren	95.5
(Switzerland) Justin Hausherr	94.2
(Canada) Ryan Harnden	92.6
(United States) Matt Hamilton	91.9
(Scotland) Euan Kyle	91.3

Seconds	%
(Switzerland) Simon Gloor	86.4
(Scotland) Craig Waddell	86.1
(Sweden) Rasmus Wranå	85.9
(Canada) E. J. Harnden	85.4
(Italy) Sebastiano Arman	83.9

Thirds	%
(Italy) Amos Mosaner	89.8
(Scotland) Robin Brydone	88.9
(Canada) Colton Lott	88.5
(Switzerland) Marco Hösli (Skip)	87.2
(Sweden) Oskar Eriksson	86.9

Skips	%
(Scotland) Ross Whyte	89.4
(Canada) Matt Dunstone	87.5
(Sweden) Niklas Edin	86.9
(Japan) Riku Yanagisawa (Fourth)	86.9
(Switzerland) Philipp Hösli (Fourth)	85.5

=== Perfect games ===
Minimum 10 shots thrown

Player	Team	Position	Shots	Opponent
Matt Hamilton	United States	Lead	20	Scotland
Marcin Ciemiński	Poland	Lead	14	Scotland
Christoffer Sundgren	Sweden	Lead	18	Norway
Matt Dunstone	Canada	Skip	12	Sweden
Riku Yanagisawa	Japan	Fourth	14	Germany
Niklas Edin	Sweden	Skip	12	Germany
Rasmus Wranå	Sweden	Second	12	Germany
Simon Olofsson	Sweden	Lead	12	Germany

== Awards ==
The awards and all-star team are as follows:

All-Star Team

- Fourth: Ross Whyte, Scotland
- Third: Amos Mosaner, Italy
- Second: Simon Gloor, Switzerland
- Lead: Christoffer Sundgren, Sweden

Collie Campbell Memorial Award

- Wilhelm Næss, Norway

== Final standings ==
Key
Team Relegated to 2026 World Championship Qualifier

Place	Team
1st place, gold medalist(s)	Sweden
2nd place, silver medalist(s)	Canada
3rd place, bronze medalist(s)	Scotland
4	United States
5	Switzerland
5	Italy
7	China
8	Japan
9	Germany
10	South Korea
11	Czech Republic
12	Poland
13	Norway

== National playdowns ==
- (South Korea) 2025 Korean Curling Championships
- 2026 United States Men's Curling Championship
- (Canada) 2026 Montana's Brier
