= 2023–24 NCDC season =

- League: United States Premier Hockey League; National Collegiate Development Conference
- Sport: Ice hockey
- Duration: Regular season September 2023 – March 2024; Postseason; March 22 – April 28, 2024
- Games: 53–52
- Teams: 18

Regular season
- Season champions: P.A.L. Jr. Islanders
- Top scorer: Ty Broad (P.A.L. Jr. Islanders)

Dineen Cup Playoffs
- Finals champions: South Shore Kings
- Runners-up: Ogden Mustangs

NCDC seasons
- ← 2022–23 2024–25 →

The 2023–24 NCDC season was the 7th season of the National Collegiate Development Conference (NCDC) Division of the United States Premier Hockey League (USPHL). The regular season ran from September 2023 to March 2024 with a slightly unbalanced schedule. The P.A.L. Jr. Islanders won the regular season championship. The South Shore Kings defeated the Ogden Mustangs 2 games to 1 to capture the Dineen Cup.

== Member changes ==
- On June 30, 2022, the USPHL announced that they would be transferring the entire Mountain Division of their Tier III league (Premier) to the NCDC for this season. Originally the Idaho Falls Spud Kings, Northern Colorado Eagles, Ogden Mustangs, Provo Predators, Pueblo Bulls and Utah Outliers were to be added. However, the after the Eagles franchise lost access to its home arena thanks to expansion from the NAHL, the USPHL then promoted the Rock Springs Grizzlies to the NCDC as well.
- When the USPHL held its annual draft for the 2023–24 season, neither the New Hampshire Junior Monarchs nor the Boston Advantage participated. Their absence went without comment by the league and they were not included on the schedule when it was released later in the summer.

== Regular season ==
The standings at the end of the regular season were as follows:

Note: x = clinched playoff berth; y = clinched conference title; z = clinched regular season title

=== Standings ===
==== Atlantic Conference ====
| Team | GP | W | L | OTL | SOL | Pts | GF | GA |
|---|---|---|---|---|---|---|---|---|
| xyz – P.A.L. Jr. Islanders | 52 | 40 | 7 | 4 | 1 | 85 | 185 | 113 |
| x – Mercer Chiefs | 52 | 27 | 22 | 2 | 1 | 57 | 169 | 173 |
| x – Rockets Hockey Club | 52 | 21 | 23 | 6 | 2 | 50 | 164 | 194 |
| x – Jersey Hitmen | 52 | 22 | 25 | 3 | 2 | 49 | 148 | 158 |
| x – Connecticut Jr. Rangers | 52 | 22 | 27 | 3 | 0 | 47 | 147 | 164 |
| Wilkes-Barre/Scranton Knights | 52 | 20 | 25 | 6 | 1 | 47 | 147 | 177 |

==== Mountain Conference ====
| Team | GP | W | L | OTL | SOL | Pts | GF | GA |
|---|---|---|---|---|---|---|---|---|
| xy – Ogden Mustangs | 53 | 37 | 12 | 3 | 1 | 78 | 195 | 125 |
| x – Utah Outliers | 53 | 36 | 13 | 2 | 2 | 76 | 189 | 139 |
| x – Provo Predators | 53 | 28 | 19 | 1 | 5 | 62 | 162 | 159 |
| x – Idaho Falls Spud Kings | 53 | 24 | 23 | 4 | 2 | 54 | 150 | 172 |
| Pueblo Bulls | 53 | 25 | 25 | 2 | 1 | 53 | 194 | 178 |
| Rock Springs Grizzlies | 53 | 9 | 39 | 4 | 1 | 23 | 116 | 233 |

==== New England Conference ====
| Team | GP | W | L | OTL | SOL | Pts | GF | GA |
|---|---|---|---|---|---|---|---|---|
| xy – Islanders Hockey Club | 52 | 36 | 11 | 4 | 1 | 77 | 173 | 122 |
| x – South Shore Kings | 52 | 36 | 12 | 2 | 2 | 76 | 192 | 123 |
| x – Utica Jr. Comets | 52 | 30 | 17 | 4 | 1 | 65 | 188 | 154 |
| x – Boston Junior Bruins | 52 | 25 | 23 | 3 | 1 | 54 | 158 | 196 |
| x – Northern Cyclones | 52 | 17 | 26 | 6 | 3 | 43 | 142 | 177 |
| Twin City Thunder | 52 | 16 | 31 | 4 | 1 | 37 | 107 | 169 |

=== Statistics ===
==== Scoring leaders ====
The following players led the league in regular season points at the completion of all regular season games.

| Player | Team | GP | G | A | Pts | PIM |
|---|---|---|---|---|---|---|
| Ty Broad | P.A.L. Jr. Islanders | 50 | 25 | 45 | 70 | 24 |
| Parker Osborn | Ogden Mustangs | 51 | 38 | 28 | 66 | 30 |
| Hunter Hayes | Pueblo Bulls | 51 | 38 | 26 | 64 | 15 |
| Garrett Joss | Utah Outliers | 53 | 19 | 42 | 61 | 83 |
| Cam Bergeman | Rockets Hockey Club | 48 | 35 | 25 | 60 | 96 |
| Payne Gatewood | Utica Jr. Comets | 52 | 27 | 31 | 58 | 16 |
| William Johnson | Pueblo Bulls | 47 | 21 | 36 | 57 | 8 |
| Carter Hanrahan | P.A.L. Jr. Islanders | 49 | 17 | 40 | 57 | 87 |
| Kotaro Murase | South Shore Kings | 52 | 22 | 33 | 55 | 22 |
| Tikhon Ashikhmin | Islanders Hockey Club | 52 | 22 | 32 | 54 | 45 |
| Dimitri Voyatzis | Ogden Mustangs | 49 | 17 | 37 | 54 | 33 |
| Jack Hanson | Pueblo Bulls | 50 | 16 | 38 | 54 | 38 |

== Dineen Cup playoffs ==
Conference Qualifier (Best-of-1) | Conference Semifinals (Best-of-3)
A1 | P.A.L. Jr. Islanders | 0 | 3 | 5
A4 | Jersey Hitmen | 1 | 1 | 2
A4 | Jersey Hitmen | 4
A5 | Connecticut Jr. Rangers | 2
Atlantic Conference
A2 | Mercer Chiefs | 1 | 4 | 4
A3 | Rockets Hockey Club | 6 | 2 | 2
East Region
NE1 | Islanders Hockey Club | 5 | 5 | -
NE4 | Boston Junior Bruins | 1 | 2 | -
NE4 | Boston Junior Bruins | 5
NE5 | Northern Cyclones | 2
New England Conference
NE2 | South Shore Kings | 5 | 2* | -
NE3 | Utica Jr. Comets | 2 | 1 | -
Mountain Conference

Regional Semifinals (Best-of-5)
A1 | P.A.L. Jr. Islanders | 6 | 1 | 7 | 5 | -
A2 | Mercer Chiefs | 1 | 2 | 4 | 0 | -
NE1 | Islanders Hockey Club | 3 | 0 | 2 | - | -
NE2 | South Shore Kings | 4* | 4 | 6 | - | -
M1 | Ogden Mustangs | 4 | 3 | 1 | 4* | -
M4 | Idaho Falls Spud Kings | 1 | 1 | 2* | 3 | -
M2 | Utah Outliers | 2 | 4 | 5 | 2 | -
M3 | Provo Predators | 6 | 2 | 3 | 0 | -

Regional Finals (Best-of-5)
A1 | P.A.L. Jr. Islanders | 4 | 4 | 2 | 1 | -
NE2 | South Shore Kings | 3 | 5* | 5 | 5 | -
M1 | Ogden Mustangs | 4 | 3 | 5 | - | -
M2 | Utah Outliers | 1 | 2 | 0 | - | -

Championship (Best-of-3)
NE2 | South Shore Kings | 3 | 3 | 4*
M1 | Ogden Mustangs | 7 | 1 | 3

Note: * denotes overtime period(s)
