= 2026 World Championship Pre-Qualifier =

Curling competition

- Host city: Dumfries, Scotland (Pan Continental); Ljubljana, Slovenia (Europe)
- Dates: April 13–16 (Pan Continental); May 5–11 (Europe)
- Men's qualifiers: Mexico; India; Slovenia; Latvia
- Women's qualifiers: France; Poland

The 2026 World Championship Pre-Qualifier is a new curling event introduced by World Curling as part of major structural changes implemented for the 2026–2030 Olympic cycle. The competition is divided into two regions: Pan Continental and Europe. Each region hosts separate men's and women's events, however due to a lack of entries, there was no Pan Continental women’s event.

The top two teams from each gender in both regions qualify for the 2026 World Championship Qualifier (Men & Women). This is an open event, available to any nation who hasn't already qualified for the upcoming World Championship or World Championship Qualifier.

== Pan Continental ==
=== Men ===
==== Teams ====
The teams are listed as follows:

Chinese Taipei	India	Jamaica
Skip: Lin Ting-li; Third: Lin Chen-han; Second: Chang Che-lun; Lead: Lin Bo-hao	Skip: P. N. Raju; Third: Girithar Anthay Suthakaran; Second: Sudheer Reddy; Lead: Kishan Vasant	Skip: Ian Robertson; Third: Don Johnston; Second: Cameron Johnston; Lead: Elliott Lai; Alternate: Luke Samuels
Kenya	Mexico	Saudi Arabia
Skip: Oilver Echenje; Third: Hassnein Ali Shah; Second: Rogen Muriithi; Lead: Robert Mutai	Skip: Diego Tompkins; Third: Ramy Cohen; Second: Joaquin Villanueva Figueroa; Lead: Mateo Tompkins	Skip: Suleiman Alaqel; Third: Hussain Hagawi; Second: Mohammad Aldaraan; Lead: Munir Albeelbisi; Alternate: Abdullah Alzahrani

==== Round Robin Standings ====
Final Round Robin Standings

Key
Teams to Playoffs

Country	Skip	W	L	W–L	DSC
Mexico	Diego Tompkins	5	0	–	64.44
Jamaica	Ian Robertson	3	2	1–1	72.64
India	P. N. Raju	3	2	1–1	74.56
Chinese Taipei	Lin Ting-li	3	2	1–1	79.97
Saudi Arabia	Suleiman Alaqel	1	4	–	129.23
Kenya	Oilver Echenje	0	5	–	DNS

Round Robin Summary Table
Pos.	Country	Chinese Taipei	India	Jamaica	Kenya	Mexico	Saudi Arabia	Record
4	Chinese Taipei	—	6–4	2–6	W–L	4–7	8–6	3–2
3	India	4–6	—	7–3	W–L	4–6	14–4	3–2
2	Jamaica	6–2	3–7	—	W–L	4–6	10–7	3–2
DNS	Kenya	L–W	L–W	L–W	—	L–W	L–W	0–5
1	Mexico	7–4	6–4	6–4	W–L	—	10–1	5–0
5	Saudi Arabia	6–8	4–14	7–10	W–L	1–10	—	1–4

==== Playoffs ====
Qualification Game 1
1	Mexico	8
2	Jamaica	6

Qualification Game 2
2	Jamaica	7
3	India	9

Qualified
Mexico
India

===== Qualification Game 1 =====
Thursday, April 16, 9:00

Team	1	2	3	4	5	6	7	8	Final
Mexico (Tompkins) 🔨	2	1	0	1	1	0	0	3	8
Jamaica (Robertson)	0	0	1	0	0	3	2	0	6

===== Qualification Game 2 =====
Thursday, April 16, 15:00

Team	1	2	3	4	5	6	7	8	Final
Jamaica (Robertson) 🔨	3	0	1	0	1	0	2	0	7
India (Raju)	0	2	0	1	0	5	0	1	9

==== Final standings ====
Key
Qualified for 2026 World Championship Qualifier Men

Place	Team
1st place, gold medalist(s)	Mexico
2nd place, silver medalist(s)	India
3rd place, bronze medalist(s)	Jamaica
4	Chinese Taipei
5	Saudi Arabia
DNS	Kenya

== Europe ==
=== Men ===
==== Teams ====
The teams are listed as follows:

Bosnia and Herzegovina	Bulgaria	Croatia	England
Skip: Vedran Dimić; Third: Aleksa Mrković; Second: Zeljko Rakić; Lead: Dejan Ćeremidžić; Alternate: Aleksa Cincar	Skip: Reto Seiler; Third: Stanimir Petrov; Second: Stoil Georgiev; Lead: Tihomir Todorov; Alternate: Bojidar Momerin	Fourth: Hrvoje Tolić; Skip: Ante Baus; Second: Miroslav Jurković; Lead: Bruno Samardžić; Alternate: Vedran Horvat	Skip: Andrew Reed; Third: James Whittle; Second: Callum Mclain; Lead: Colin Mouat; Alternate: Benjamin Holcombe
Estonia	Finland	Georgia	Hungary
Skip: Erkki Lill; Third: Siim Sein; Second: Andres Jakobson; Lead: Olari Kalvik; Alternate: Jaanus Lindre	Skip: Kalle Kiiskinen; Third: Jani Sullanmaa; Second: Teemu Salo; Lead: Paavo Kuosmanen; Alternate: Iiro Sipola	Skip: Irakli Enukidze; Third: Irakli Khechuashvili; Second: Kakhaber Arabidze; Lead: Koka Kalandadze; Alternate: Mikheil Bujiashvili	Skip: Gergely Szabó; Third: Attila Gubányi; Second: Nándor Miklós; Lead: Baján Kán Ferenci
Latvia	Liechtenstein	Lithuania	Portugal
Skip: Arnis Veidemanis; Third: Roberts Reinis Buncis; Second: Aleksandrs Baranovskis; Lead: Rihards Jeske; Alternate: Janis Klive	Skip: Lukas Matt; Third: Christian Sprenger; Second: Peter Prasch; Lead: Harald Sprenger; Alternate: Johannes Zimmermann	Skip: Matas Junevičius; Third: Domas Ramazauskas; Second: Donatas Kiudys; Lead: Rokas Sadauskas	Skip: Eric Fenech; Third: Chris Ribau; Second: Allan Chaves; Lead: William Barbosa; Alternate: Benjamin Silva
Romania	Serbia	Slovakia	Slovenia
Skip: Allen Coliban; Third: Cristian Mățău; Second: Tudor Mihalca; Lead: Răzvan Bouleanu	Skip: Đorđe Nešković; Third: Filip Stojanović; Second: Goran Ungurović; Lead: Viktor Savičević	Skip: Jakub Jurkovič; Third: Ján Horáček; Second: Jakub Červenka; Lead: Patrik Kaprálik; Alternate: David Mišun	Skip: Štefan Sever; Third: Bine Sever; Second: Simon Langus; Lead: Noel Gregori; Alternate: Marko Harb
Ukraine			
Skip: Artem Suhak; Third: Yaroslav Shchur; Second: Artem Hasynets; Lead: Illia Khokhlov			

==== Round robin standings ====
Final Round Robin Standings

Key
Teams to Playoffs

Group A	Skip	W	L	W–L	DSC
Slovenia	Štefan Sever	8	0	–	43.483
England	Andrew Reed	7	1	–	43.925
Hungary	Gergely Szabó	6	2	–	45.050
Ukraine	Artem Suhak	5	3	–	99.983
Lithuania	Matas Junevičius	4	4	–	54.383
Croatia	Ante Baus	3	5	–	57.217
Serbia	Đorđe Nešković	2	6	–	152.575
Georgia	Irakli Enukidze	1	7	–	153.233
Bosnia and Herzegovina	Vedran Dimić	0	8	–	165.858

Group B	Skip	W	L	W–L	DSC
Latvia	Arnis Veidemanis	7	0	–	64.367
Finland	Kalle Kiiskinen	6	1	–	40.350
Romania	Allen Coliban	4	3	1–0	72.383
Estonia	Erkki Lill	4	3	0–1	41.617
Slovakia	Jakub Jurkovič	3	4	1–0	51.992
Portugal	Eric Fenech	3	4	0–1	118.175
Liechtenstein	Lukas Matt	1	6	–	78.667
Bulgaria	Reto Seiler	0	7	–	60.933

Group A Round Robin Summary Table
Pos.	Country	Bosnia and Herzegovina	Croatia	England	Georgia	Hungary	Lithuania	Serbia	Slovenia	Ukraine	Record
9	Bosnia and Herzegovina	—	1–11	1–12	3–8	1–17	1–6	3–8	1–15	1–12	0–8
6	Croatia	11–1	—	4–8	10–4	2–7	4–8	8–4	3–8	3–6	3–5
2	England	12–1	8–4	—	11–1	7–5	8–5	9–1	6–8	9–6	7–1
8	Georgia	8–3	4–10	1–11	—	3–19	1–17	2–9	2–13	1–19	1–7
3	Hungary	17–1	7–2	5–7	19–3	—	6–2	6–1	5–8	6–5	6–2
5	Lithuania	6–1	8–4	5–8	17–1	2–6	—	6–1	2–5	4–7	4–4
7	Serbia	8–3	4–8	1–9	9–2	1–6	1–6	—	1–7	2–12	2–6
1	Slovenia	15–1	8–3	8–6	13–2	8–5	5–2	7–1	—	5–0	8–0
4	Ukraine	12–1	6–3	6–9	19–1	5–6	7–4	12–2	0–5	—	5–3

Group B Round Robin Summary Table
Pos.	Country	Bulgaria	Estonia	Finland	Latvia	Liechtenstein	Portugal	Romania	Slovakia	Record
8	Bulgaria	—	2–8	5–6	4–6	5–7	2–9	2–8	3–6	0–7
4	Estonia	8–2	—	4–7	4–8	8–3	7–5	3–8	6–5	4–3
2	Finland	6–5	7–4	—	4–5	6–3	7–4	13–4	7–3	6–1
1	Latvia	6–4	8–4	5–4	—	5–2	14–2	7–4	6–3	7–0
7	Liechtenstein	7–5	3–8	3–6	2–5	—	3–8	2–13	3–10	1–6
6	Portugal	9–2	5–7	4–7	2–14	8–3	—	6–5	3–8	3–4
3	Romania	8–2	8–3	4–13	4–7	13–2	5–6	—	9–5	4–3
5	Slovakia	6–3	5–6	3–7	3–6	10–3	8–3	5–9	—	3–4

==== Playoffs ====
Qualification Round 1
A1	Slovenia	7
B1	Latvia	3
A2	England	3
B2	Finland	9

Qualification Round 2
B1	Latvia	8
B2	Finland	7

Qualified
Slovenia
Latvia

===== Qualification Round 1 =====
Monday, May 11, 9:00

Sheet B	1	2	3	4	5	6	7	8	Final
Slovenia (Sever) 🔨	4	0	0	1	1	1	0	X	7
Latvia (Veidemanis)	0	2	0	0	0	0	1	X	3

Sheet C	1	2	3	4	5	6	7	8	Final
England (Reed)	0	0	1	0	0	2	0	X	3
Finland (Kiiskinen) 🔨	2	2	0	2	1	0	2	X	9

===== Qualification Round 2 =====
Monday, May 11, 14:00

Sheet D	1	2	3	4	5	6	7	8	Final
Latvia (Veidemanis) 🔨	2	0	0	2	3	0	0	1	8
Finland (Kiiskinen)	0	1	3	0	0	2	1	0	7

==== Final standings ====
Key
Qualified for 2026 World Championship Qualifier Men

Place	Team
1st place, gold medalist(s)	Slovenia
2nd place, silver medalist(s)	Latvia
3rd place, bronze medalist(s)	Finland
4	England
5	Hungary
6	Romania
7	Estonia
8	Ukraine
9	Slovakia
10	Lithuania
11	Croatia
12	Portugal
13	Liechtenstein
14	Serbia
15	Bulgaria
16	Georgia
17	Bosnia and Herzegovina

=== Women ===
==== Teams ====
The teams are listed as follows:

Austria	Belgium	England	Finland
Skip: Verena Pflügler; Third: Hannah Augustin; Second: Johanna Höss; Lead: Julia Kotek; Alternate: Christina Graf-Kramlinger	Skip: Kim Catteceur; Third: Mirte Michiels; Second: Danielle Berus; Lead: Elisabeth Rossie	Skip: Angharad Ward; Third: Annabelle Martin; Second: Anna Howey; Lead: Naomi Robinson	Skip: Jenni Bäckman; Third: Elina Virtaala; Second: Susanna Säntti; Lead: Valentina Lemettinen; Alternate: Emilia Nordström
France	Israel	Luxembourg	Monaco
Fourth: Anna Li-Marchetti; Skip: Pauline Jeanneret; Second: Mathilde Rossi; Lead: Delphine Charlet	Skip: Elana Sone; Third: Andrea Stark; Second: Ada Neznamov; Lead: Elena Solodkaya	Skip: Virginie Hansen; Third: Shiori Kuboki; Second: Betty Spurgeon; Lead: Maja Bjerg-Petersen; Alternate: Monica Louie	Skip: Magali Forest; Third: Nathalie Tibaut; Second: Yonah Cohen; Lead: Christine Do Couto
Poland	Serbia	Slovakia	Slovenia
Fourth: Marta Pluta; Skip: Marta Szeliga-Frynia; Second: Julia Jawień; Lead: Marietta Dabrowska; Alternate: Magdalena Herman	Skip: Dara Gravara-Stojanović; Third: Tamara Kurešević; Second: Irini Psaraki; Lead: Lena Trifunović	Skip: Silvia Sýkorová; Third: Daniela Matulová; Second: Linda Haferová; Lead: Lucia Orokocká	Fourth: Maruša Gorišek; Skip: Ajda Zavrtanik Drglin; Second: Nina Kremžar; Lead: Liza Gregori; Alternate: Anja Pečaver
Spain			
Skip: Oihane Otaegi; Third: Daniela García; Second: Leire Otaegi; Lead: María Gómez; Alternate: Patricia Ruiz			

==== Round robin standings ====
Final Round Robin Standings

Key
Teams to Playoffs

Group A	Skip	W	L	W–L	DSC
France	Pauline Jeanneret	5	1	1–0	39.778
Poland	Marta Szeliga-Frynia	5	1	0–1	88.344
Spain	Oihane Otaegi	4	2	–	86.433
Finland	Jenni Bäckman	3	3	1–0	71.967
England	Angharad Ward	3	3	0–1	69.167
Monaco	Magali Forest	1	5	–	138.867
Serbia	Dara Gravara-Stojanović	0	6	–	199.600

Group B	Skip	W	L	W–L	DSC
Slovakia	Silvia Sýkorová	4	1	1–0	54.933
Austria	Verena Pflügler	4	1	0–1	40.289
Slovenia	Ajda Zavrtanik Drglin	3	2	–	97.767
Israel	Elana Sone	2	3	–	80.667
Belgium	Kim Catteceur	1	4	1–0	126.289
Luxembourg	Virginie Hansen	1	4	0–1	84.056

Group A Round Robin Summary Table
Pos.	Country	England	Finland	France	Monaco	Poland	Serbia	Spain	Record
5	England	—	3–4	9–8	17–2	5–8	18–0	5–8	3–3
4	Finland	4–3	—	5–7	14–2	4–13	13–3	8–10	3–3
1	France	8–9	7–5	—	12–1	6–5	10–1	11–7	5–1
6	Monaco	2–17	2–14	1–12	—	3–16	7–3	2–19	1–5
2	Poland	8–5	13–4	5–6	16–3	—	W–L	9–8	5–1
7	Serbia	0–18	3–13	1–10	3–7	L–W	—	0–16	0–6
3	Spain	8–5	8–2	7–11	19–2	8–9	16–0	—	4–2

Group B Round Robin Summary Table
Pos.	Country	Austria	Belgium	Israel	Luxembourg	Slovakia	Slovenia	Record
2	Austria	—	9–3	8–5	7–6	4–6	8–4	4–1
5	Belgium	3–9	—	5–9	8–7	3–9	3–7	1–4
4	Israel	5–8	9–5	—	7–8	4–11	9–4	2–3
6	Luxembourg	6–7	7–8	8–7	—	3–12	3–7	1–4
1	Slovakia	6–4	9–3	11–4	12–3	—	3–5	4–1
3	Slovenia	4–8	7–3	4–9	7–3	5–3	—	3–2

==== Playoffs ====
Qualification Round 1
A1	France	10
B1	Slovakia	1
A2	Poland	5
B2	Austria	4

Qualification Round 2
B1	Slovakia	3
A2	Poland	9

Qualified
France
Poland

===== Qualification Round 1 =====
Monday, May 11, 9:00

Sheet D	1	2	3	4	5	6	7	8	Final
France (Jeanneret) 🔨	3	2	0	2	2	1	X	X	10
Slovakia (Sýkorová)	0	0	1	0	0	0	X	X	1

Sheet E	1	2	3	4	5	6	7	8	9	Final
Poland (Szeliga-Frynia) 🔨	1	0	1	0	1	0	1	0	1	5
Austria (Pflügler)	0	1	0	0	0	1	0	2	0	4

===== Qualification Round 2 =====
Monday, May 11, 14:00

Sheet C	1	2	3	4	5	6	7	8	Final
Slovakia (Sýkorová) 🔨	0	2	0	0	1	0	0	X	3
Poland (Szeliga-Frynia)	2	0	2	1	0	3	1	X	9

==== Final standings ====
Key
Qualified for 2026 World Championship Qualifier Women

Place	Team
1st place, gold medalist(s)	France
2nd place, silver medalist(s)	Poland
3rd place, bronze medalist(s)	Slovakia
4	Austria
5	Spain
6	Slovenia
7	Finland
8	Israel
9	England
10	Belgium
11	Luxembourg
12	Monaco
13	Serbia
