= 2026 World Championship Qualifier Women =

Curling competition

- Host city: Östersund, Sweden
- Dates: November 21–26
- Qualifiers: TBD; TBD; TBD; TBD; TBD; TBD

The 2026 World Championship Qualifier Women is a new curling event introduced by World Curling as part of major structural changes implemented for the 2026–2030 Olympic cycle. Six teams from this event will qualify for the 2027 World Women's Curling Championship, they will join the twelve teams that already qualified from the 2026 World Women's Curling Championship to create the newly expanded eighteen team field. This event wil be held in Östersund, Sweden on November 21 to 26.

The sixteen teams that qualified for this event through their placements at 2026 World Women's Curling Championship, 2025 Pan Continental Curling Championships, 2025 European Curling Championships, World Ranking, or 2026 World Championship Pre-Qualifier. They are competing to be one of six teams to join Switzerland, Canada, Sweden, Japan, South Korea, Turkey, China, Italy, Norway, Scotland, Denmark, and the United States at the 2027 World Women's Curling Championship. Four teams will be relegated to the 2027 World Championship Pre-Qualifier.

== Qualification ==
Sixteen curling federations qualified to participate in the first ever World Championship Qualifier Women.

Means of Qualification	Vacancies	Qualified
2026 World Women's Curling Championship	1	Australia
2025 Pan Continental Curling Championships	2	New Zealand; Mexico
2025 European Curling Championships	3	Lithuania; Germany; Czech Republic
2025 Pan Continental Curling Championships B Division	2	Philippines; Kazakhstan
2025 European Curling Championships B Division	~~2~~ 3	Latvia; Estonia; England (Note: After initially qualifying for the tournament, Kenya withdrew, allowing England, which had won the bronze medal at the 2025 European Curling Championship B Division, to take its place.)
World Rankings	2	Hungary; Chinese Taipei
2026 World Championship Pre-Qualifier Pan Continental (Note: Hong Kong and Kenya were the only two member associations to submit entries for the 2026 World Championship Pre-Qualifier Pan Continental Region Women and therefore qualified automatically.)	~~2~~ 1	Hong Kong; ~~Kenya~~
2026 World Championship Pre-Qualifier Europe	2	France; Poland
TOTAL	16	

== Teams ==
The teams were as follows:

Australia	Chinese Taipei	Czech Republic	England
Fourth: Ágnes Szentannai; Skip: Jessica Wytrychowski; Second: Jennifer Westhagen; Lead: Joanne Robins; Alternate: Anne Powell	Skip: Lee Ming-chieh; Third: Fan Yu-ting; Second: Chang Chia-chi; Lead: Tsai Yu-yin	Skip: Michaela Baudyšová; Third: Karolína Špundová; Second: Aneta Müllerová; Lead: Matylda Volfová; Alternate: Emma Seifriedová	Skip: Angharad Ward; Third: Annabelle Martin; Second: Anna Howey; Lead: Naomi Robinson
Estonia	France	Germany	Hong Kong
Skip: Marie Kaldvee; Third: Liisa Turmann; Second: Kerli Laidsalu; Lead: Kaidi Elmik; Alternate: Elisabeth Tammer	Fourth: Anna Li-Marchetti; Skip: Pauline Jeanneret; Second: Mathilde Rossi; Lead: Delphine Charlet; Alternate: Chana Beitone	Fourth: Kim Sutor; Skip: Sara Messenzehl; Second: Zoe Antes; Lead: Joy Sutor; Alternate: Vera Tiuliakova	Skip: Ling-Yue Hung; Third: Ada Shang; Second: Hu Pianpian; Lead: Helen Li; Alternate: May Yam
Hungary	Kazakhstan	Latvia	Lithuania
Skip: Zsuzsanna Pinter; Third: Anett Kiss; Second: Alexandra Milanovic; Lead: Dorottya Flank-Tanito; Alternate: Erika Tuskene Borszeki	Skip: Tilsimay Alliyarova; Third: Merey Tastemir; Second: Yekaterina Ashimova; Lead: Angelina Penyayeva; Alternate: Darina Idrissova	Skip: Evelīna Barone; Third: Rēzija Ieviņa; Second: Katrīna Gaidule; Lead: Betija Gulbe; Alternate: Daina Barone	Skip: Virginija Paulauskaitė; Third: Rūta Blažienė; Second: Miglė Kiudytė; Lead: Olga Dvojeglazova; Alternate: Justina Zalieckienė
Mexico	New Zealand	Philippines	Poland
Fourth: Estefana Quintero; Third: Karla Knepper; Skip: Angelica Perez Anzures; Lead: Veronica Huerta; Alternate: Karla Martinez	Skip: Alexandra Goloborodko; Third: Thivya Turner; Second: Sophie Tran; Lead: Grace Apuwai-Bishop; Alternate: Lucy Jefferies	Skip: Katie Dubberstein; Third: Leilani Dubberstein; Second: Jessica Byers; Lead: Lindsey Schmalz; Alternate: Anne Marie Bonache	Skip: Marta Pluta; Third: Julia Jawień; Second: Marietta Dąbrowska; Lead: Magdalena Herman; Alternate: Marta Szeliga-Frynia

== Round robin standings ==
After Draw 6

Key
Teams to Playoffs & Qualified for the 2027 World Women's Curling Championship
Teams to Qualification Playoffs
Teams Relegated to the 2027 World Championship Pre-Qualifier

Group A	Skip	W	L	W–L	DSC
Germany	Sara Messenzehl	3	0	–	24.975
France	Pauline Jeanneret	3	0	–	76.675
Estonia	Marie Kaldvee	2	1	1–0	15.925
Kazakhstan	Tilsimay Alliyarova	2	1	0–1	64.525
Mexico	Angelica Perez Anzures	1	2	1–0	33.625
Poland	Marta Pluta	1	2	0–1	63.775
Australia	Jessica Wytrychowski	0	3	–	34.300
Chinese Taipei	Lee Ming-chieh	0	3	–	87.950

Group B	Skip	W	L	W–L	DSC
Latvia	Evelīna Barone	3	0	–	53.425
Hungary	Zsuzsanna Pinter	3	0	–	83.375
Czech Republic	Michaela Baudyšová	2	1	–	23.825
Hong Kong	Ling-Yue Hung	2	1	–	44.225
Lithuania	Virginija Paulauskaitė	1	2	–	56.050
Philippines	Katie Dubberstein	1	2	–	71.650
England	Angharad Ward	0	3	–	33.575
New Zealand	Alexandra Goloborodko	0	3	–	67.150

Group A Round Robin Summary Table
Pos.	Country	Australia	Chinese Taipei	Estonia	France	Germany	Kazakhstan	Mexico	Poland	Record
7	Australia	—	D13	D9	4–5	D7	7–8	D11	5–7	0–3
8	Chinese Taipei	D13	—	D11	4–8	1–9	1–11	D9	D7	0–3
3	Estonia	D9	D11	—	D7	3–7	8–3	D13	10–4	2–1
2	France	5–4	8–4	D7	—	D9	D13	6–2	D11	3–0
1	Germany	D7	9–1	7–3	D9	—	D11	10–2	D13	3–0
4	Kazakhstan	8–7	11–1	3–8	D13	D11	—	D7	D9	2–1
5	Mexico	D11	D9	D13	2–6	2–10	D7	—	7–6	1–2
6	Poland	7–5	D7	4–10	D11	D13	D9	6–7	—	1–2

Group B Round Robin Summary Table
Pos.	Country	Czech Republic	England	Hong Kong	Hungary	Latvia	Lithuania	New Zealand	Philippines	Record
3	Czech Republic	—	D14	D10	D8	3–8	5–3	11–2	D12	2–1
7	England	D14	—	D12	4–5	8–10	2–7	D8	D10	0–3
4	Hong Kong	D10	D12	—	4–6	D8	6–1	7–5	D14	2–1
2	Hungary	D8	5–4	6–4	—	D10	D12	D14	7–6	3–0
1	Latvia	8–3	10–8	D8	D10	—	D14	D12	10–5	3–0
5	Lithuania	3–5	7–2	1–6	D12	D14	—	D10	D8	1–2
8	New Zealand	2–11	D8	5–7	D14	D12	D10	—	7–8	0–3
6	Philippines	D12	D10	D14	6–7	5–10	D8	8–7	—	1–2

== Round robin results ==
All draw times are listed in Central European Time (UTC+01:00).

=== Draw 1 ===
Saturday, November 21, 10:00

Sheet B	1	2	3	4	5	6	7	8	Final
Germany (Messenzehl) 🔨	1	4	2	1	1	0	X	X	9
Chinese Taipei (Lee)	0	0	0	0	0	1	X	X	1

Sheet C	1	2	3	4	5	6	7	8	Final
Australia (Wytrychowski) 🔨	0	2	1	0	0	0	1	0	4
France (Jeanneret)	2	0	0	1	0	1	0	1	5

Sheet D	1	2	3	4	5	6	7	8	Final
Mexico (Perez Anzures) 🔨	1	1	2	3	0	0	0	0	7
Poland (Pluta)	0	0	0	0	2	1	1	2	6

Sheet E	1	2	3	4	5	6	7	8	Final
Estonia (Kaldvee) 🔨	1	0	0	3	0	3	1	X	8
Kazakhstan (Alliyarova)	0	2	0	0	1	0	0	X	3

=== Draw 2 ===
Saturday, November 21, 14:30

Sheet B	1	2	3	4	5	6	7	8	Final
Hungary (Pinter)	0	1	0	0	0	1	2	1	5
England (Ward) 🔨	2	0	1	0	1	0	0	0	4

Sheet C	1	2	3	4	5	6	7	8	Final
Czech Republic (Baudyšová) 🔨	1	0	0	0	0	2	0	X	3
Latvia (Barone)	0	0	3	1	3	0	1	X	8

Sheet D	1	2	3	4	5	6	7	8	Final
Philippines (Dubberstein)	0	3	0	3	0	2	0	0	8
New Zealand (Goloborodko) 🔨	1	0	1	0	2	0	1	2	7

Sheet E	1	2	3	4	5	6	7	8	Final
Hong Kong (Hung) 🔨	0	2	1	0	1	1	1	X	6
Lithuania (Paulauskaitė)	1	0	0	0	0	0	0	X	1

=== Draw 3 ===
Saturday, November 21, 19:00

Sheet B	1	2	3	4	5	6	7	8	Final
France (Jeanneret)	1	0	1	0	1	1	2	X	6
Mexico (Perez Anzures) 🔨	0	0	0	2	0	0	0	X	2

Sheet C	1	2	3	4	5	6	7	8	Final
Chinese Taipei (Lee)	0	0	0	1	0	0	X	X	1
Kazakhstan (Alliyarova) 🔨	4	2	3	0	1	1	X	X	11

Sheet D	1	2	3	4	5	6	7	8	Final
Estonia (Kaldvee)	0	0	2	1	0	0	0	X	3
Germany (Messenzehl) 🔨	1	1	0	0	3	1	1	X	7

Sheet E	1	2	3	4	5	6	7	8	Final
Australia (Wytrychowski)	0	0	2	0	1	0	2	0	5
Poland (Pluta) 🔨	1	1	0	1	0	3	0	1	7

=== Draw 4 ===
Sunday, November 22, 10:00

Sheet B	1	2	3	4	5	6	7	8	Final
Latvia (Barone) 🔨	0	4	0	5	1	0	X	X	10
Philippines (Dubberstein)	0	0	3	0	0	2	X	X	5

Sheet C	1	2	3	4	5	6	7	8	Final
England (Ward)	0	0	1	0	0	0	1	X	2
Lithuania (Paulauskaitė) 🔨	2	0	0	1	3	1	0	X	7

Sheet D	1	2	3	4	5	6	7	8	Final
Hong Kong (Hung)	1	0	0	0	1	1	0	1	4
Hungary (Pinter) 🔨	0	1	2	0	0	0	3	0	6

Sheet E	1	2	3	4	5	6	7	8	Final
Czech Republic (Baudyšová) 🔨	4	0	0	6	1	0	X	X	11
New Zealand (Goloborodko)	0	0	1	0	0	1	X	X	2

=== Draw 5 ===
Sunday, November 22, 14:30

Sheet B	1	2	3	4	5	6	7	8	Final
Australia (Wytrychowski)	2	1	0	0	0	0	4	0	7
Kazakhstan (Alliyarova) 🔨	0	0	1	2	1	1	0	3	8

Sheet C	1	2	3	4	5	6	7	8	Final
Poland (Pluta)	0	1	0	1	0	2	X	X	4
Estonia (Kaldvee) 🔨	2	0	2	0	6	0	X	X	10

Sheet D	1	2	3	4	5	6	7	8	Final
France (Jeanneret)	0	0	0	2	0	2	4	X	8
Chinese Taipei (Lee) 🔨	1	1	1	0	1	0	0	X	4

Sheet E	1	2	3	4	5	6	7	8	Final
Germany (Messenzehl) 🔨	3	0	3	0	3	1	X	X	10
Mexico (Perez Anzures)	0	1	0	1	0	0	X	X	2

=== Draw 6 ===
Sunday, November 22, 19:00

Sheet B	1	2	3	4	5	6	7	8	Final
Czech Republic (Baudyšová) 🔨	2	0	0	1	0	0	0	2	5
Lithuania (Paulauskaitė)	0	0	1	0	1	0	1	0	3

Sheet C	1	2	3	4	5	6	7	8	9	Final
New Zealand (Goloborodko)	1	0	0	1	0	2	1	0	0	5
Hong Kong (Hung) 🔨	0	2	1	0	1	0	0	1	2	7

Sheet D	1	2	3	4	5	6	7	8	9	Final
Latvia (Barone)	0	2	0	1	0	0	2	3	2	10
England (Ward) 🔨	2	0	1	0	4	1	0	0	0	8

Sheet E	1	2	3	4	5	6	7	8	Final
Hungary (Pinter)	0	0	1	0	0	3	0	3	7
Philippines (Dubberstein) 🔨	2	1	0	1	1	0	1	0	6

=== Draw 7 ===
Monday, November 23, 10:00

Sheet B	1	2	3	4	5	6	7	8	Final
Estonia (Kaldvee)									0
France (Jeanneret)									0

Sheet C	1	2	3	4	5	6	7	8	Final
Germany (Messenzehl)									0
Australia (Wytrychowski)									0

Sheet D	1	2	3	4	5	6	7	8	Final
Kazakhstan (Alliyarova)									0
Mexico (Perez Anzures)									0

Sheet E	1	2	3	4	5	6	7	8	Final
Poland (Pluta)									0
Chinese Taipei (Lee)									0

=== Draw 8 ===
Monday, November 23, 14:30

Sheet B	1	2	3	4	5	6	7	8	Final
Hong Kong (Hung)									0
Latvia (Barone)									0

Sheet C	1	2	3	4	5	6	7	8	Final
Hungary (Pinter)									0
Czech Republic (Baudyšová)									0

Sheet D	1	2	3	4	5	6	7	8	Final
Lithuania (Paulauskaitė)									0
Philippines (Dubberstein)									0

Sheet E	1	2	3	4	5	6	7	8	Final
New Zealand (Goloborodko)									0
England (Ward)									0

=== Draw 9 ===
Monday, November 23, 19:00

Sheet B	1	2	3	4	5	6	7	8	Final
Kazakhstan (Alliyarova)									0
Poland (Pluta)									0

Sheet C	1	2	3	4	5	6	7	8	Final
Mexico (Perez Anzures)									0
Chinese Taipei (Lee)									0

Sheet D	1	2	3	4	5	6	7	8	Final
Australia (Wytrychowski)									0
Estonia (Kaldvee)									0

Sheet E	1	2	3	4	5	6	7	8	Final
France (Jeanneret)									0
Germany (Messenzehl)									0

=== Draw 10 ===
Tuesday, November 24, 10:00

Sheet B	1	2	3	4	5	6	7	8	Final
Lithuania (Paulauskaitė)									0
New Zealand (Goloborodko)									0

Sheet C	1	2	3	4	5	6	7	8	Final
Philippines (Dubberstein)									0
England (Ward)									0

Sheet D	1	2	3	4	5	6	7	8	Final
Czech Republic (Baudyšová)									0
Hong Kong (Hung)									0

Sheet E	1	2	3	4	5	6	7	8	Final
Latvia (Barone)									0
Hungary (Pinter)									0

=== Draw 11 ===
Tuesday, November 24, 14:30

Sheet B	1	2	3	4	5	6	7	8	Final
Mexico (Perez Anzures)									0
Australia (Wytrychowski)									0

Sheet C	1	2	3	4	5	6	7	8	Final
France (Jeanneret)									0
Poland (Pluta)									0

Sheet D	1	2	3	4	5	6	7	8	Final
Germany (Messenzehl)									0
Kazakhstan (Alliyarova)									0

Sheet E	1	2	3	4	5	6	7	8	Final
Chinese Taipei (Lee)									0
Estonia (Kaldvee)									0

=== Draw 12 ===
Tuesday, November 24, 19:00

Sheet B	1	2	3	4	5	6	7	8	Final
Philippines (Dubberstein)									0
Czech Republic (Baudyšová)									0

Sheet C	1	2	3	4	5	6	7	8	Final
Latvia (Barone)									0
New Zealand (Goloborodko)									0

Sheet D	1	2	3	4	5	6	7	8	Final
Hungary (Pinter)									0
Lithuania (Paulauskaitė)									0

Sheet E	1	2	3	4	5	6	7	8	Final
England (Ward)									0
Hong Kong (Hung)									0

=== Draw 13 ===
Wednesday, November 25, 9:00

Sheet B	1	2	3	4	5	6	7	8	Final
Poland (Pluta)									0
Germany (Messenzehl)									0

Sheet C	1	2	3	4	5	6	7	8	Final
Estonia (Kaldvee)									0
Mexico (Perez Anzures)									0

Sheet D	1	2	3	4	5	6	7	8	Final
Chinese Taipei (Lee)									0
Australia (Wytrychowski)									0

Sheet E	1	2	3	4	5	6	7	8	Final
Kazakhstan (Alliyarova)									0
France (Jeanneret)									0

=== Draw 14 ===
Wednesday, November 25, 13:00

Sheet B	1	2	3	4	5	6	7	8	Final
New Zealand (Goloborodko)									0
Hungary (Pinter)									0

Sheet C	1	2	3	4	5	6	7	8	Final
Hong Kong (Hung)									0
Philippines (Dubberstein)									0

Sheet D	1	2	3	4	5	6	7	8	Final
England (Ward)									0
Czech Republic (Baudyšová)									0

Sheet E	1	2	3	4	5	6	7	8	Final
Lithuania (Paulauskaitė)									0
Latvia (Barone)									0

== Playoffs ==
=== Playoffs ===
Semifinals
A1
B2
B1
A2

Gold medal game
Bronze medal game

==== Semifinals ====
Wednesday, November 25, 19:00

Sheet B	1	2	3	4	5	6	7	8	Final
									0
									0

Sheet D	1	2	3	4	5	6	7	8	Final
									0
									0

==== Bronze Medal Game ====
Thursday, November 26, 9:00

Sheet C	1	2	3	4	5	6	7	8	Final
									0
									0

==== Gold Medal Game ====
Thursday, November 26, 15:00

Sheet C	1	2	3	4	5	6	7	8	Final
									0
									0

=== Qualification Playoffs ===
Qualification Round 1
A3
B3
A4
B4

Qualification Round 2

Qualified

==== Qualification Round 1 ====
Thursday, November 26, 9:00

Sheet B	1	2	3	4	5	6	7	8	Final
									0
									0

Sheet E	1	2	3	4	5	6	7	8	Final
									0
									0

==== Qualification Round 2 ====
Thursday, November 26, 15:00

Sheet D	1	2	3	4	5	6	7	8	Final
									0
									0

== Final standings ==
Key
Teams Qualified for the 2027 World Women's Curling Championship
Teams Relegated to the 2027 World Championship Pre-Qualifier

Place	Team
1st place, gold medalist(s)	
2nd place, silver medalist(s)	
3rd place, bronze medalist(s)	
4	
5	
6	
7	
8	
9	
10	
11	
12	
13	
14	
15	
16	
