= Casper Warbirds =

- City: Casper, Wyoming
- League: United States Premier Hockey League; National Collegiate Development Conference (NCDC)
- Conference: West
- Division: Mountain
- Founded: 2020
- Home arena: Casper Ice Arena
- Colors: Purple, black, and gray
- Head coach: Ray Tremblay

Franchise history
- 2020–2022: Provo Riverblades
- 2022–2024: Provo Predators
- 2024–present: Casper Warbirds

The Casper Warbirds are a Tier II junior ice hockey team playing in the United States Premier Hockey League (USPHL) National Collegiate Development Conference (NCDC) division. The Warbirds play their home games at Casper Ice Arena in Casper, Wyoming.

== History ==
Despite the uncertainty of the COVID-19 pandemic, the USPHL added the Provo Riverblades as an expansion franchise in the summer of 2020. The team began play in the Premier (Tier III) division and played three largely unsuccessful seasons. After their second year, the club was rebranded as the 'Provo Predators' and, one year later, they were promoted to the NCDC (Tier II) division along with five other western teams.

Just as the Predators were able to find their stride, the franchise was sold. The team moved to Casper, Wyoming and became the Warbirds.

== Season-by-season records ==
Season	GP	W	L	OTL	SOL	Pts	GF	GA	Regular season finish	Playoffs
Provo Riverblades
Premier Division
2020–21	46	22	17	7	-	51	187	168	t–4th of 5, Mountain Div. t–26th of 62, Premier	Did not qualify
2021–22	50	7	41	2	-	16	82	279	5th of 5, Mountain Div. 61st of 64, Premier	Lost Div. Qualifier series, 0–2 (Pueblo Bulls)
Provo Predators
2022–23	52	19	32	1	0	39	161	227	6th of 6, Mountain Div. 48th of 70, Premier	Lost Div. Qualifier series, 1–2 (Pueblo Bulls)
NCDC Division
2023–24	53	28	19	1	5	62	162	159	3rd of 6, Mountain Div. 7th of 18, NCDC	Lost Div. Semifinal series, 1–3 (Utah Outliers)
Casper Warbirds
2024–25	53	12	39	2	0	26	118	201	6th of 6, Mountain Div. 21st of 22, NCDC	Did not qualify
2025–26	54	7	44	3	0	17	86	247	7th of 7, Mountain Div. 33rd of 33, NCDC	Did not qualify

== Former logos ==
Provo Riverblades

Provo Predators
