= 2026 World Championship Qualifier Men =

Curling competition

- Host city: Aberdeen, Scotland
- Dates: November 8–13
- Qualifiers: Netherlands; Norway; Denmark; Philippines; Austria; Australia

The 2026 World Championship Qualifier Men is a new curling event introduced by World Curling as part of major structural changes implemented for the 2026–2030 Olympic cycle. Six teams from this event will qualify for the 2027 World Men's Curling Championship, they will join the twelve teams that already qualified from the 2026 World Men's Curling Championship to create the newly expanded eighteen team field. This event wil be held in Aberdeen, Scotland on November 8 to 13.

The sixteen teams that qualified for this event through their placements at 2026 World Men's Curling Championship, 2025 Pan Continental Curling Championships, 2025 European Curling Championships, World Ranking, or 2026 World Championship Pre-Qualifier. They are competing to be one of six teams to join Sweden, Canada, Scotland, United States, Switzerland, Italy, China, Japan, Germany, South Korea, Czech Republic and Poland at the 2027 World Men's Curling Championship. Four teams will be relegated to the 2027 World Championship Pre-Qualifier.

== Qualification ==
Sixteen curling federations qualified to participate in the first ever World Championship Qualifier Men.

Means of Qualification	Vacancies	Qualified
2026 World Men's Curling Championship	1	Norway
2025 Pan Continental Curling Championships	3	Philippines; New Zealand; Australia
2025 European Curling Championships	2	Denmark; Austria
2025 Pan Continental Curling Championships B Division	2	Hong Kong; Kazakhstan
2025 European Curling Championships B Division	2	Belgium; Spain
World Rankings	2	Netherlands; Turkey
2026 World Championship Pre-Qualifier Pan Continental	2	Mexico; India
2026 World Championship Pre-Qualifier Europe	2	Slovenia; Latvia
TOTAL	16	

== Teams ==
The teams were as follows:

Australia	Austria	Belgium	Denmark
Fourth: Dean Hewitt; Third: Tanner Davis; Second: Steve Johns; Skip: Hugh Millikin; Alternate: Flynn Collins	Fourth: Mathias Genner; Skip: Jonas Backofen; Second: Matthäus Hofer; Lead: Florian Mavec; Alternate: Johannes Kramlinger	Fourth: Jeroen Spruyt; Skip: Timothy Verreycken; Second: Tuur Vermeiren; Lead: Tom Goethals; Alternate: Dirk Heylen	Skip: Jacob Schmidt; Third: Kasper Jurlander Bøge; Second: Nikki Jensen; Lead: Alexander Qvist; Alternate: Rasmus Schmidt
Hong Kong	India	Kazakhstan	Latvia
Fourth: Cheng Ching Nam; Skip: Jason Chang; Second: Chung Cheuk Hei; Lead: Ma Chi Lap; Alternate: Yu Sui King	Skip: P. N. Raju; Third: Sudheer Reddy; Second: Kishan Vasant; Lead: Rahul Mirani	Skip: Abylaikhan Zhuzbay; Third: Adil Zhumagozha; Second: Aidos Alliyar; Lead: Madiyar Korabayev; Alternate: Dmitriy Garagul	Skip: Arnis Veidemanis; Third: Roberts Reinis Buncis; Second: Janis Klive; Lead: Aleksandrs Baranovskis; Alternate: Rihards Jeske
Mexico	Netherlands	New Zealand	Norway
Skip: Diego Tompkins; Third: Ramy Cohen; Second: Joaquin Villanueva; Lead: Mateo Tompkins; Alternate: Dakari Cauich	Skip: Wouter Gösgens; Third: Laurens Hoekman; Second: Simon Spits; Lead: Hessel Janssens; Alternate: Jaap van Dorp	Skip: Anton Hood; Third: Hunter Walker; Second: Ben Smith; Lead: Jared Palanuik; Alternate: William Loe	Skip: Magnus Ramsfjell; Third: Steffen Walstad; Second: Bendik Ramsfjell; Lead: Mathias Brænden; Alternate: Thomas Løvold
Philippines	Slovenia	Spain	Turkey
Skip: Marc Pfister; Third: Christian Haller; Second: Enrico Pfister; Lead: Pedro Malvar	Skip: Štefan Sever; Third: Bine Sever; Second: Simon Langus; Lead: Noel Gregori; Alternate: Marko Harb	Skip: Mikel Unanue; Third: Alejandro Cardona Sánchez; Second: Eneko Sáez de Ocariz; Lead: Aleksei Palacin Khromchenkov; Alternate: Pere Mas	Skip: Uğurcan Karagöz; Third: Muhammet Haydar Demirel; Second: Selâhattin Eser; Lead: Serkan Karagöz; Alternate: Mehmet Fatih Bayramoğlu

== Round robin standings ==
Final Round Robin Standings

Key
Teams to Playoffs & Qualified for the 2027 World Men's Curling Championship
Teams to Qualification Playoffs
Teams Relegated to the 2027 World Championship Pre-Qualifier

Group A	Skip	W	L	W–L	DSC
Norway	Magnus Ramsfjell	7	0	–	36.733
Denmark	Jacob Schmidt	5	2	–	57.433
Austria	Jonas Backofen	4	3	1–0	57.700
Turkey	Uğurcan Karagöz	4	3	0–1	60.008
Hong Kong	Jason Chang	3	4	1–0	72.625
Kazakhstan	Abylaikhan Zhuzbay	3	4	0–1	81.017
Spain	Mikel Unanue	2	5	–	75.358
Mexico	Diego Tompkins	0	7	–	54.900

Group B	Skip	W	L	W–L	DSC
Netherlands	Wouter Gösgens	5	2	1–0	25.225
Philippines	Marc Pfister	5	2	0–1	49.867
Australia	Hugh Millikin	4	3	2–1; 1–1	56.567
Slovenia	Štefan Sever	4	3	2–1; 1–1	59.367
New Zealand	Anton Hood	4	3	2–1; 1–1	77.117
Belgium	Timothy Verreycken	4	3	0–3	77.175
Latvia	Arnis Veidemanis	2	5	–	53.375
India	P. N. Raju	0	7	–	100.633

Group A Round Robin Summary Table
Pos.	Country	Austria	Denmark	Hong Kong	Kazakhstan	Mexico	Norway	Spain	Turkey	Record
3	Austria	—	3–6	8–4	4–7	9–3	4–7	9–2	10–4	4–3
2	Denmark	6–3	—	13–2	3–5	12–2	5–6	11–2	7–4	5–2
5	Hong Kong	4–8	2–13	—	8–5	7–3	2–14	11–10	4–9	3–4
6	Kazakhstan	7–4	5–3	5–8	—	9–3	1–6	4–7	3–6	3–4
8	Mexico	3–9	2–12	3–7	3–9	—	1–15	2–12	4–9	0–7
1	Norway	7–4	6–5	14–2	6–1	15–1	—	10–3	9–2	7–0
7	Spain	2–9	2–11	10–11	7–4	12–2	3–10	—	4–11	2–5
4	Turkey	4–10	4–7	9–4	6–3	9–4	2–9	11–4	—	4–3

Group B Round Robin Summary Table
Pos.	Country	Australia	Belgium	India	Latvia	Netherlands	New Zealand	Philippines	Slovenia	Record
3	Australia	—	6–4	6–1	7–4	4–7	6–4	4–5	4–5	4–3
6	Belgium	4–6	—	6–2	4–1	7–4	5–6	7–6	7–8	4–3
8	India	1–6	2–6	—	6–7	2–7	1–9	2–4	7–8	0–7
7	Latvia	4–7	1–4	7–6	—	6–5	2–11	4–7	2–8	2–5
1	Netherlands	7–4	4–7	7–2	5–6	—	7–4	12–1	9–3	5–2
5	New Zealand	4–6	6–5	9–1	11–2	4–7	—	4–5	7–5	4–3
2	Philippines	5–4	6–7	4–2	7–4	1–12	5–4	—	7–6	5–2
4	Slovenia	5–4	8–7	8–7	8–2	3–9	5–7	6–7	—	4–3

== Round robin results ==
All draw times are listed in Greenwich Mean Time (UTC+00:00).

=== Draw 1 ===
Sunday, November 8, 10:00

Sheet B	1	2	3	4	5	6	7	8	Final
Spain (Unanue) 🔨	1	0	0	1	0	2	0	X	4
Turkey (Karagöz)	0	3	3	0	3	0	2	X	11

Sheet C	1	2	3	4	5	6	7	8	Final
Austria (Backofen) 🔨	4	0	2	1	0	0	1	X	8
Hong Kong (Chang)	0	2	0	0	1	1	0	X	4

Sheet D	1	2	3	4	5	6	7	8	Final
Norway (Ramsfjell) 🔨	3	2	3	0	4	3	X	X	15
Mexico (Tompkins)	0	0	0	1	0	0	X	X	1

Sheet E	1	2	3	4	5	6	7	8	Final
Denmark (Schmidt) 🔨	0	0	2	0	0	1	0	0	3
Kazakhstan (Zhuzbay)	0	1	0	1	1	0	1	1	5

=== Draw 2 ===
Sunday, November 8, 14:30

Sheet B	1	2	3	4	5	6	7	8	Final
India (Raju) 🔨	2	0	2	0	0	0	3	0	7
Slovenia (Sever)	0	1	0	1	2	1	0	3	8

Sheet C	1	2	3	4	5	6	7	8	Final
Australia (Millikin) 🔨	2	0	2	0	2	0	1	X	7
Latvia (Veidemanis)	0	1	0	1	0	2	0	X	4

Sheet D	1	2	3	4	5	6	7	8	Final
Philippines (Pfister)	0	0	3	1	0	0	0	1	5
New Zealand (Hood) 🔨	0	1	0	0	2	1	0	0	4

Sheet E	1	2	3	4	5	6	7	8	Final
Belgium (Verreycken) 🔨	2	1	0	1	0	1	2	X	7
Netherlands (Gösgens)	0	0	3	0	1	0	0	X	4

=== Draw 3 ===
Sunday, November 8, 19:00

Sheet B	1	2	3	4	5	6	7	8	Final
Hong Kong (Chang)	0	0	0	0	2	0	X	X	2
Norway (Ramsfjell) 🔨	5	3	1	2	0	3	X	X	14

Sheet C	1	2	3	4	5	6	7	8	Final
Turkey (Karagöz) 🔨	2	0	1	0	3	0	0	X	6
Kazakhstan (Zhuzbay)	0	1	0	1	0	1	0	X	3

Sheet D	1	2	3	4	5	6	7	8	Final
Denmark (Schmidt) 🔨	2	1	2	0	4	2	X	X	11
Spain (Unanue)	0	0	0	2	0	0	X	X	2

Sheet E	1	2	3	4	5	6	7	8	Final
Austria (Backofen)	0	2	1	2	0	4	X	X	9
Mexico (Tompkins) 🔨	1	0	0	0	2	0	X	X	3

=== Draw 4 ===
Monday, November 9, 10:00

Sheet B	1	2	3	4	5	6	7	8	Final
Latvia (Veidemanis) 🔨	0	0	0	2	2	0	0	X	4
Philippines (Pfister)	1	3	1	0	0	1	1	X	7

Sheet C	1	2	3	4	5	6	7	8	Final
Slovenia (Sever) 🔨	0	0	0	0	2	1	X	X	3
Netherlands (Gösgens)	2	1	4	2	0	0	X	X	9

Sheet D	1	2	3	4	5	6	7	8	Final
Belgium (Verreycken) 🔨	0	0	1	0	4	1	0	X	6
India (Raju)	0	0	0	1	0	0	1	X	2

Sheet E	1	2	3	4	5	6	7	8	Final
Australia (Millikin) 🔨	0	1	0	0	3	1	0	1	6
New Zealand (Hood)	1	0	2	0	0	0	1	0	4

=== Draw 5 ===
Monday, November 9, 14:30

Sheet B	1	2	3	4	5	6	7	8	Final
Austria (Backofen)	0	0	2	0	2	0	0	0	4
Kazakhstan (Zhuzbay) 🔨	1	1	0	2	0	2	0	1	7

Sheet C	1	2	3	4	5	6	7	8	Final
Mexico (Tompkins) 🔨	0	1	0	0	1	0	X	X	2
Denmark (Schmidt)	2	0	3	3	0	4	X	X	12

Sheet D	1	2	3	4	5	6	7	8	Final
Hong Kong (Chang)	0	2	0	0	0	2	0	X	4
Turkey (Karagöz) 🔨	3	0	2	3	0	0	1	X	9

Sheet E	1	2	3	4	5	6	7	8	Final
Spain (Unanue)	0	2	0	1	0	0	0	X	3
Norway (Ramsfjell) 🔨	1	0	2	0	2	3	2	X	10

=== Draw 6 ===
Monday, November 9, 19:00

Sheet B	1	2	3	4	5	6	7	8	Final
Australia (Millikin)	1	0	3	0	0	0	0	0	4
Netherlands (Gösgens) 🔨	0	1	0	2	0	1	1	2	7

Sheet C	1	2	3	4	5	6	7	8	Final
New Zealand (Hood) 🔨	1	0	0	0	3	1	0	1	6
Belgium (Verreycken)	0	2	0	2	0	0	1	0	5

Sheet D	1	2	3	4	5	6	7	8	Final
Latvia (Veidemanis)	1	0	1	0	0	0	0	X	2
Slovenia (Sever) 🔨	0	1	0	1	1	2	3	X	8

Sheet E	1	2	3	4	5	6	7	8	Final
India (Raju) 🔨	0	0	1	0	0	1	0	X	2
Philippines (Pfister)	0	0	0	1	1	0	2	X	4

=== Draw 7 ===
Tuesday, November 10, 10:00

Sheet B	1	2	3	4	5	6	7	8	Final
Denmark (Schmidt) 🔨	3	0	3	5	0	2	X	X	13
Hong Kong (Chang)	0	1	0	0	1	0	X	X	2

Sheet C	1	2	3	4	5	6	7	8	Final
Spain (Unanue)	0	0	0	0	1	0	1	X	2
Austria (Backofen) 🔨	0	3	3	2	0	1	0	X	9

Sheet D	1	2	3	4	5	6	7	8	Final
Kazakhstan (Zhuzbay)	0	1	0	0	0	0	X	X	1
Norway (Ramsfjell) 🔨	0	0	2	2	1	1	X	X	6

Sheet E	1	2	3	4	5	6	7	8	Final
Mexico (Tompkins)	0	0	2	0	0	0	2	X	4
Turkey (Karagöz) 🔨	2	2	0	2	1	2	0	X	9

=== Draw 8 ===
Tuesday, November 10, 14:30

Sheet B	1	2	3	4	5	6	7	8	Final
Belgium (Verreycken) 🔨	0	1	0	0	1	0	2	X	4
Latvia (Veidemanis)	0	0	0	1	0	0	0	X	1

Sheet C	1	2	3	4	5	6	7	8	Final
India (Raju)	0	0	1	0	0	0	X	X	1
Australia (Millikin) 🔨	2	1	0	1	1	1	X	X	6

Sheet D	1	2	3	4	5	6	7	8	Final
Netherlands (Gösgens) 🔨	3	4	4	0	0	1	X	X	12
Philippines (Pfister)	0	0	0	1	0	0	X	X	1

Sheet E	1	2	3	4	5	6	7	8	Final
New Zealand (Hood)	0	2	0	3	0	2	0	X	7
Slovenia (Sever) 🔨	1	0	1	0	1	0	2	X	5

=== Draw 9 ===
Tuesday, November 10, 19:00

Sheet B	1	2	3	4	5	6	7	8	Final
Kazakhstan (Zhuzbay)	0	3	0	2	0	2	2	X	9
Mexico (Tompkins) 🔨	1	0	2	0	0	0	0	X	3

Sheet C	1	2	3	4	5	6	7	8	Final
Norway (Ramsfjell) 🔨	2	0	3	0	3	1	X	X	9
Turkey (Karagöz)	0	1	0	1	0	0	X	X	2

Sheet D	1	2	3	4	5	6	7	8	Final
Austria (Backofen)	0	0	1	0	0	2	0	X	3
Denmark (Schmidt) 🔨	1	1	0	2	1	0	1	X	6

Sheet E	1	2	3	4	5	6	7	8	9	Final
Hong Kong (Chang) 🔨	2	0	2	0	2	0	4	0	1	11
Spain (Unanue)	0	3	0	1	0	2	0	4	0	10

=== Draw 10 ===
Wednesday, November 11, 10:00

Sheet B	1	2	3	4	5	6	7	8	Final
Netherlands (Gösgens) 🔨	1	0	0	2	0	1	1	2	7
New Zealand (Hood)	0	0	1	0	3	0	0	0	4

Sheet C	1	2	3	4	5	6	7	8	Final
Philippines (Pfister)	0	3	0	1	0	3	0	0	7
Slovenia (Sever) 🔨	1	0	2	0	1	0	1	1	6

Sheet D	1	2	3	4	5	6	7	8	Final
Australia (Millikin) 🔨	2	0	2	0	1	0	1	0	6
Belgium (Verreycken)	0	2	0	1	0	0	0	1	4

Sheet E	1	2	3	4	5	6	7	8	Final
Latvia (Veidemanis) 🔨	2	0	2	0	0	2	0	1	7
India (Raju)	0	1	0	0	3	0	2	0	6

=== Draw 11 ===
Wednesday, November 11, 14:30

Sheet B	1	2	3	4	5	6	7	8	Final
Norway (Ramsfjell) 🔨	1	0	3	0	2	0	1	X	7
Austria (Backofen)	0	1	0	1	0	2	0	X	4

Sheet C	1	2	3	4	5	6	7	8	Final
Hong Kong (Chang)	1	0	2	1	0	2	1	X	7
Mexico (Tompkins) 🔨	0	1	0	0	2	0	0	X	3

Sheet D	1	2	3	4	5	6	7	8	Final
Spain (Unanue)	0	1	1	0	2	1	2	X	7
Kazakhstan (Zhuzbay) 🔨	3	0	0	1	0	0	0	X	4

Sheet E	1	2	3	4	5	6	7	8	Final
Turkey (Karagöz) 🔨	1	0	0	1	1	0	1	0	4
Denmark (Schmidt)	0	1	2	0	0	3	0	1	7

=== Draw 12 ===
Wednesday, November 11, 19:00

Sheet B	1	2	3	4	5	6	7	8	Final
Philippines (Pfister)	1	0	0	0	2	0	0	2	5
Australia (Millikin) 🔨	0	0	0	1	0	2	1	0	4

Sheet C	1	2	3	4	5	6	7	8	Final
Latvia (Veidemanis)	0	0	0	1	0	1	X	X	2
New Zealand (Hood) 🔨	3	1	2	0	5	0	X	X	11

Sheet D	1	2	3	4	5	6	7	8	Final
India (Raju)	0	0	0	1	0	1	X	X	2
Netherlands (Gösgens) 🔨	1	3	1	0	2	0	X	X	7

Sheet E	1	2	3	4	5	6	7	8	9	Final
Slovenia (Sever) 🔨	2	1	2	0	0	0	2	0	1	8
Belgium (Verreycken)	0	0	0	2	1	1	0	3	0	7

=== Draw 13 ===
Thursday, November 12, 9:00

Sheet B	1	2	3	4	5	6	7	8	Final
Mexico (Tompkins)	0	1	0	0	1	0	X	X	2
Spain (Unanue) 🔨	4	0	4	1	0	3	X	X	12

Sheet C	1	2	3	4	5	6	7	8	Final
Denmark (Schmidt)	0	0	1	0	2	1	0	1	5
Norway (Ramsfjell) 🔨	0	2	0	2	0	0	2	0	6

Sheet D	1	2	3	4	5	6	7	8	Final
Turkey (Karagöz)	0	0	2	0	2	0	0	X	4
Austria (Backofen) 🔨	2	3	0	2	0	1	2	X	10

Sheet E	1	2	3	4	5	6	7	8	9	Final
Kazakhstan (Zhuzbay)	1	0	0	1	0	2	0	1	0	5
Hong Kong (Chang) 🔨	0	0	2	0	1	0	2	0	3	8

=== Draw 14 ===
Thursday, November 12, 13:00

Sheet B	1	2	3	4	5	6	7	8	Final
New Zealand (Hood) 🔨	2	1	3	1	2	0	X	X	9
India (Raju)	0	0	0	0	0	1	X	X	1

Sheet C	1	2	3	4	5	6	7	8	Final
Belgium (Verreycken)	0	1	0	2	0	2	0	2	7
Philippines (Pfister) 🔨	3	0	1	0	1	0	1	0	6

Sheet D	1	2	3	4	5	6	7	8	Final
Slovenia (Sever)	1	0	1	1	0	0	2	0	6
Australia (Millikin) 🔨	0	2	0	0	0	1	0	1	4

Sheet E	1	2	3	4	5	6	7	8	Final
Netherlands (Gösgens)	0	1	2	0	2	0	0	0	5
Latvia (Veidemanis) 🔨	3	0	0	1	0	0	0	2	6

== Playoffs ==
=== Playoffs ===
Semifinals
A1	Norway	10
B2	Philippines	3
B1	Netherlands	7
A2	Denmark	2

Gold medal game
A1	Norway	4
B1	Netherlands	11
Bronze medal game
B2	Philippines	3
A2	Denmark	5

==== Semifinals ====
Thursday, November 12, 19:00

Sheet B	1	2	3	4	5	6	7	8	Final
Norway (Ramsfjell) 🔨	3	0	4	0	3	0	X	X	10
Philippines (Pfister)	0	1	0	1	0	1	X	X	3

Sheet D	1	2	3	4	5	6	7	8	Final
Netherlands (Gösgens) 🔨	1	0	3	2	0	1	X	X	7
Denmark (Schmidt)	0	1	0	0	1	0	X	X	2

==== Bronze Medal Game ====
Friday, November 13, 9:00

Sheet C	1	2	3	4	5	6	7	8	Final
Philippines (Pfister)	0	1	0	1	0	1	0	X	3
Denmark (Schmidt) 🔨	0	0	2	0	2	0	1	X	5

==== Gold Medal Game ====
Friday, November 13, 15:00

Sheet C	1	2	3	4	5	6	7	8	Final
Norway (Ramsfjell)	0	2	0	0	2	0	0	X	4
Netherlands (Gösgens) 🔨	3	0	3	1	0	1	3	X	11

=== Qualification Playoffs ===
Qualification Round 1
A3	Austria	5
B3	Australia	2
A4	Turkey	6
B4	Slovenia	4

Qualification Round 2
B3	Australia	9
A4	Turkey	5

Qualified
Austria
Australia

==== Qualification Round 1 ====
Friday, November 13, 9:00

Sheet B	1	2	3	4	5	6	7	8	Final
Austria (Backofen)	0	2	0	1	0	0	1	1	5
Australia (Millikin) 🔨	1	0	0	0	0	1	0	0	2

Sheet E	1	2	3	4	5	6	7	8	Final
Turkey (Karagöz) 🔨	0	1	0	0	4	0	0	1	6
Slovenia (Sever)	0	0	1	1	0	2	0	0	4

==== Qualification Round 2 ====
Friday, November 13, 15:00

Sheet D	1	2	3	4	5	6	7	8	Final
Australia (Millikin) 🔨	4	0	1	0	0	1	0	3	9
Turkey (Karagöz)	0	1	0	1	1	0	2	0	5

== Final standings ==
Key
Teams Qualified for the 2027 World Men's Curling Championship
Teams Relegated to the 2027 World Championship Pre-Qualifier

Place	Team
1st place, gold medalist(s)	Netherlands
2nd place, silver medalist(s)	Norway
3rd place, bronze medalist(s)	Denmark
4	Philippines
5	Austria
6	Australia
7	Turkey
8	Slovenia
9	Hong Kong
10	New Zealand
11	Belgium
12	Kazakhstan
13	Latvia
14	Spain
15	Mexico
16	India
