= Seacoast Spartans =

- City: Exeter, New Hampshire
- League: United States Premier Hockey League; National Collegiate Development Conference (NCDC)
- Division: New England
- Founded: 2019
- Home arena: Rinks At Exeter
- Colors: Red, gold, and black

Franchise history
- 2019–2025: Seacoast Spartans
- 2025–Present: NY Dynamo

The Seacoast Spartans were a Tier II junior ice hockey team that played in the United States Premier Hockey League's (USPHL) National Collegiate Development Conference (NCDC).

== History ==
In 2019, the Seacoast Performance Academy reached an agreement with the Eastern Hockey League to found a new Tier II club and enter the league as an expansion franchise. After five seasons, the club withdrew from the league to join the rival United States Premier Hockey League. However, after the worst performance in their short history, the Academy decided to sell their franchise rights and withdraw from Tier II hockey. The club was sold to the NY Dynamo organization and relocated to Clifton Park, New York.

== Season-by-season records ==
Season	GP	W	L	OTL	SOL	Pts	GF	GA	Regular season finish	Playoffs
EHL
2019–20	46	17	28	1	-	35	123	160	8th of 11, New England Conf. 14th of 19, EHL	Won Conf. Preliminary, 5–3 (Walpole Express); Lost Conf. Quarterfinal series, 0–2 (Vermont Lumberjacks)
2020–21	38	16	19	3	-	35	114	139	t-3rd of 5, North Div. t-12th of 18, EHL	Won Div. Semifinal series, 2–0 (New Hampshire Avalanche); Lost Div. Final series, 0–2 (Lumberjacks Hockey Club)
2021–22	46	19	23	4	-	42	147	174	4th of 4, North Div. 13th of 17, EHL	Lost Div. Semifinal series, 0–2 (New Hampshire Avalanche)
2022–23	46	30	12	4	0	64	162	126	2nd of 4, North Div. 2nd of 19, EHL	Won Div. Semifinal series, 2–0 (New England Wolves); Lost Div. Final series, 1–2 (New Hampshire Avalanche)
2023–24	46	24	16	2	4	54	140	142	2nd of 5, North Div. 9th of 23, EHL	Won Div. Semifinal series, 2–0 (New England Wolves); Lost Div. Final series, 0–2 (New Hampshire Avalanche)
NCDC
2024–25	54	10	34	6	4	30	129	229	8th of 9, New England Div. 19th of 22, NCDC	Did not qualify
