= The Ice Sheet at Ogden =

Sports venue

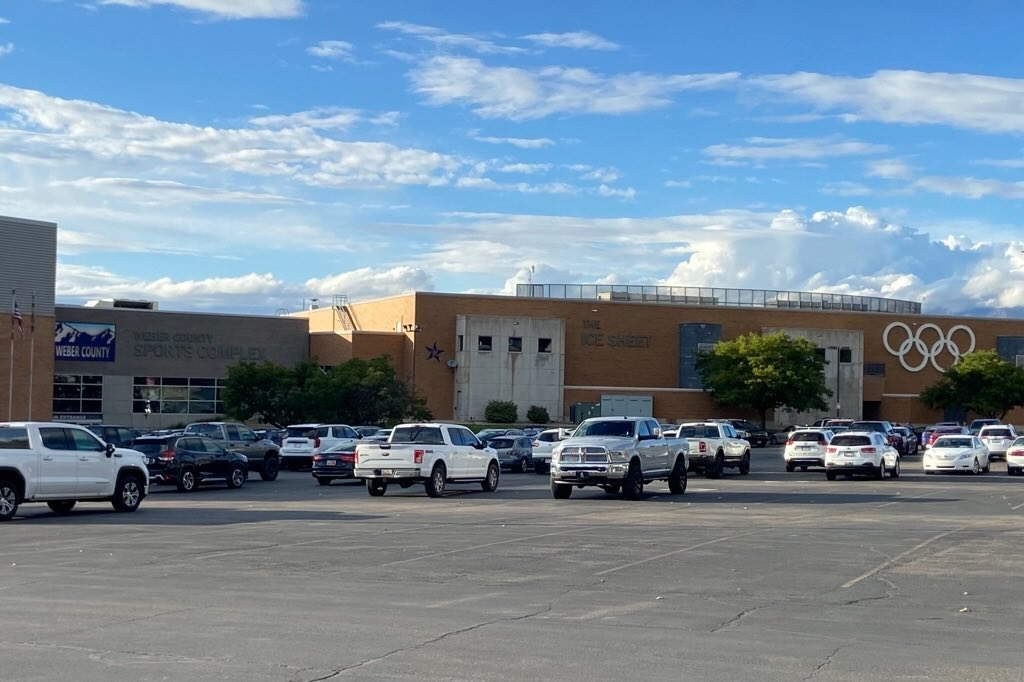
- Building exterior The Ice Sheet exterior
- Interactive map of The Ice Sheet at Ogden
- Address: 4390 Harrison Blvd. Ogden, Utah; United States
- Location: Weber State University
- Coordinates: 41°11′00″N 111°56′47″W
- Owner: Weber County, Utah
- Capacity: 2,000
- Surface: Ice
- Public transit: 603X at Dee Events Center station

Construction
- Groundbreaking: December 17, 1992
- Built: 1992–1994
- Opened: April 2, 1994
- Renovated: 1999 (concrete floor)
- Cost: US$6,200,000 (equivalent to $14,220,000 in 2025)

Tenants
- XIX Olympic Winter Games (February 2002); Ogden Mustangs (WSHL/USPHL/NAHL) (2011–present); Weber State University men's ice hockey

Website
- The Ice Sheet at Ogden

The Ice Sheet at Ogden, also known as the Weber County Ice Sheet, is located 35 miles (56 km) north of Salt Lake City on the campus of Weber State University in Ogden. The Ice Sheet opened in 1994 as a recreational training center for curling, ice hockey, and figure skating. During the 2002 Winter Olympics the Ice Sheet hosted curling events. The Ice Sheet is also home to the Ogden Mustangs, a junior ice hockey team in the North American Hockey League and Weber State University's men's hockey team.

The facility, owned by Weber County, has hosted several World Curling Federation-sanctioned events. The Ice Sheet offers local competitions, public skating, lesson programs, hockey, curling, figure skating and speed skating, ice shows, and includes a pro shop, conference rooms, locker rooms, and an outdoor terrace for meetings.

== History ==
Following the passage of Utah's 1989 Olympic referendum, Ogden City submitted a proposal to the Utah Sports Authority and Utah's Olympic organizers to construct an Olympic-sized practice ice sheet in the city. On September 10, 1990, the Utah Sports Authority selected a site near the Dee Events Center in Ogden as the site of an Olympic ice sheet, over other locations in downtown Salt Lake City and Provo, Utah. The property for the venue would be leased from Weber State University for 50 years at a cost of $1. A groundbreaking ceremony at the start of construction was held December 17, 1992. The facility was to cost $5.9 million, with $3 million coming from the State of Utah (as authorized in the 1989 Olympic referendum), $2 million from Weber County, and the remainder from private donations.

Following the venue's completion, a two-day grand opening was held on April 2–3, 1994, which included performances by Olympian Scott Hamilton, and U.S. Champions Todd Sands and Jennifer Moreno. By the time it was completed the price had gone up to $6.2 million, it had seating for 2,000 spectators, and was 52,500 square feet (4,900 m^{2}) in size. It was originally designed to be used for practice and preliminary competitions among ice skaters and hockey teams for the 2002 Winter Olympics. It was later decided that the ice sheet would be used for curling events, and on May 2, 1999, the ice sheet closed to replace the sand-based floor with a more efficient concrete floor. The sand-based flooring allowed freezing tubes to shift, causing uneven ridges in the ice. The new concrete floor was finished July 1999, and the ice sheet reopened for public use within weeks.

== 2002 Winter Olympics ==
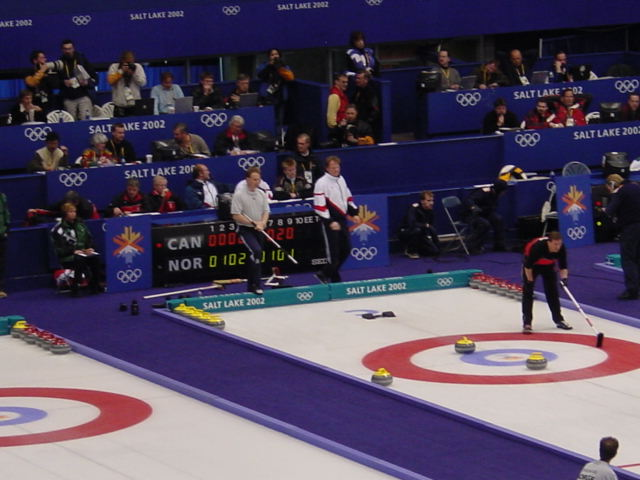
2002 Olympic curling competitions inside the Ice Sheet

The Ice Sheet at Ogden hosted curling at the 2002 Winter Olympics, which had been first introduced during the 1998 Winter Olympics. The venue held about 2,000 spectators, and 96.7% of tickets were sold, with a total of 40,572 spectators witnessing events at the Ice Sheet.
