= 2024–25 NCDC season =

- League: United States Premier Hockey League; National Collegiate Development Conference
- Sport: Ice hockey
- Duration: Regular season September 2024 – March 2025; Postseason; April 11 – May 20, 2025
- Games: 54–31
- Teams: 22

Regular season
- Season champions: South Shore Kings
- Top scorer: Siamion Morschyonok (Pueblo Bulls)

Dineen Cup Playoffs
- Dineen Cup Playoffs MVP: Charlie Durkin (Spud Kings)
- Finals champions: Idaho Falls Spud Kings
- Runners-up: South Shore Kings

NCDC seasons
- ← 2023–24 2025–26 →

The 2024–25 NCDC season was the 8th season of the National Collegiate Development Conference (NCDC) Division of the United States Premier Hockey League (USPHL). The regular season ran from September 2024 to March 2025 with a slightly unbalanced schedule. The South Shore Kings won the regular season championship and were defeated by the Idaho Falls Spud Kings 1–2 in the Championship game for the Dineen Cup.

== Member changes ==
- On April 1, 2024, the USPHL announced that they had approved the sale of the Boston Junior Bruins' NCDC franchise. The team would relocate to West Chester, Pennsylvania and become the West Chester Wolves. The Junior Bruins would continue to operate their Premier division team.
- On April 25, 2024, the USPHL announced the sale and relocation of the Provo Predators. The team was moved to Casper, Wyoming and, a month later, announced their new name of Casper Warbirds.
- On May 23, 2024, the Twin City Thunder relocated to Exeter, New Hampshire and changed their name to the Thunder Hockey Club.
- In mid-June, the USPHL announced the addition of two new teams with both the Boston Junior Rangers and Worcester Jr. Railers joining the NCDC for this season. The two had previously been members of the Eastern Hockey League. Less than a week later, a third EHL team, the Seacoast Spartans, were also transferred from the EHL to the NCDC.
- On November 11, 2024, the USPHL announced that they had approved the addition of the Boston Junior Terriers for the 2025–26 season. The following day, the team was suspended by the EHL due to violating the terms of their 5-year contract. The Terriers, who then became the Boston Dogs, immediately were accepted into the NCDC. The league then adjusted the remainder of its schedule to compensate for the extra franchise.

== Regular season ==
The standings at the end of the regular season were as follows:

Note: x = clinched playoff berth; y = clinched division title; z = clinched regular season title

=== Standings ===
==== Atlantic Division ====
Team	GP	W	L	OTL	SOL	Pts	GF	GA
xy – P.A.L. Jr. Islanders	54	41	7	3	3	88	205	118
x – Mercer Chiefs	54	38	15	1	0	77	195	140
x – Jersey Hitmen	54	28	21	4	2	61	190	161
x – Rockets Hockey Club	54	26	23	4	1	57	162	161
x – West Chester Wolves	53	24	25	3	1	52	142	151
Wilkes-Barre/Scranton Knights	54	18	30	4	2	42	118	195
Connecticut Jr. Rangers	53	18	31	1	3	40	123	169

==== Mountain Division ====
Team	GP	W	L	OTL	SOL	Pts	GF	GA
xy – Idaho Falls Spud Kings	53	38	10	4	1	81	188	117
x – Ogden Mustangs	53	37	13	2	1	77	198	124
x – Utah Outliers	53	29	17	4	3	65	159	142
x – Pueblo Bulls	53	32	20	1	0	65	171	156
Rock Springs Grizzlies	53	11	36	5	1	28	116	210
Casper Warbirds	53	12	39	2	0	26	118	201

==== New England Division ====
Team	GP	W	L	OTL	SOL	Pts	GF	GA
xyz – South Shore Kings	54	44	7	3	0	96	206	103
x – Northern Cyclones	54	37	11	4	2	80	204	139
x – Utica Jr. Comets	54	31	17	3	3	68	194	159
x – Islanders Hockey Club	54	30	21	3	0	63	172	169
x – Worcester Jr. Railers	54	24	25	3	2	53	156	190
Thunder Hockey Club	54	20	31	0	3	43	123	179
Boston Junior Rangers	54	15	38	6	4	31	149	216
Seacoast Spartans	54	10	34	6	4	30	129	229
Boston Dogs	31	10	19	2	0	22	89	116

=== Statistics ===
==== Scoring leaders ====
The following players led the league in regular season points at the completion of all regular season games.

Player	Team	GP	G	A	Pts	PIM
Siamion Morschyonok	Pueblo Bulls	51	28	47	75	40
Jared Rothman	New Jersey Rockets	54	34	35	69	16
Matsvei Morshchyonok	Pueblo Bulls	52	32	37	69	24
Braxton Powers	Islanders Hockey Club	51	32	36	68	101
Easton Edwards	Idaho Falls Spud Kings	52	27	36	63	91
Sam Ciappa	Mercer Chiefs	53	24	39	63	0
Will Rassier	South Shore Kings	53	30	32	62	10
Ryan Franks	P.A.L. Jr. Islanders	54	31	30	61	41
Andrew Schmidt	Idaho Falls Spud Kings	50	30	31	61	14
Brody Simko	Ogden Mustangs	52	27	34	61	131

== Dineen Cup playoffs ==
The three winners of the division finals and the losing team with the best regular season record advance to the double-elimination quarterfinals. The three division winners are reseeded based upon regular season records with the losing team seeded 4th.

Division Qualifier (Best-of-3)
A4	Rockets Hockey Club	3	4*	-
A5	West Chester Wolves	1	3	-
NE4	Islanders Hockey Club	2	2	1
NE5	Worcester Jr. Railers	3	0	4

Division Semifinals (Best-of-5)
A1	P.A.L. Jr. Islanders	3	2	8	-	-
A4	Rockets Hockey Club	2	1	2	-	-
Atlantic Division
A2	Mercer Chiefs	3	5	4	2	-
A3	Jersey Hitmen	4*	4	3	1	-
NE1	South Shore Kings	5	2*	7	-	-
NE5	Worcester Jr. Railers	2	1	4	-	-
New England Division
NE2	Northern Cyclones	4*	4	2	4	-
NE3	Utica Jr. Comets	3	1	3*	0	-
M1	Idaho Falls Spud Kings	3	3*	1	4	2
M4	Pueblo Bulls	4*	2	3	0	1
Mountain Division
M2	Ogden Mustangs	3	2	4	5	-
M3	Utah Outliers	1	3	2	2	-

Division Finals (Best-of-5)
A1	P.A.L. Jr. Islanders	3*	5	2	4	2
A2	Mercer Chiefs	2	2	3	6	5
NE1	South Shore Kings	3*	1	0	3	-
NE2	Northern Cyclones	2	4	3	6	-
M1	Idaho Falls Spud Kings	0	3	2	2*	-
M2	Ogden Mustangs	2	1	1	1	-

Quarterfinal (Best-of-1)
1	Idaho Falls Spud Kings	1*
4	South Shore Kings	0
2	Northern Cyclones	3
3	Mercer Chiefs	4*
Losers Semifinal
2	Northern Cyclones	2
4	South Shore Kings	3*

Winners Semifinal (Best-of-1)
1	Idaho Falls Spud Kings	1
3	Mercer Chiefs	0
Losers Final
3	Mercer Chiefs	0
4	South Shore Kings	4

Championship (Best-of-1)
1	Idaho Falls Spud Kings	2
4	South Shore Kings	1

Note: * denotes overtime period(s)
