= Park City Outliers =

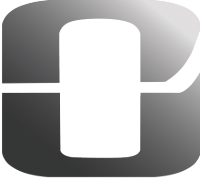
- City: Heber City, Utah
- League: United States Premier Hockey League (USPHL); National Collegiate Development Conference (NCDC)
- Conference: West
- Division: Mountain
- Founded: 2011
- Home arena: Black Mountain Resort Arena
- Colors: Black, gray, yellow
- General manager: Paul Taylor
- Head coach: Paul Taylor

Franchise history
- 2011–2012: Park City Moose
- 2012–2016: Salt Lake City Moose
- 2016–present: Utah Outliers

Championships
- Regular season titles: 2: 2022, 2023
- Division titles: 3: 2018, 2022, 2023

The Park City Outliers are a Tier II junior ice hockey team playing in the United States Premier Hockey League (USPHL) National Collegiate Development Conference (NCDC) division. The Outliers play their home games at Black Rock Ice Arena in Heber City, Utah. They previously played at Acord Ice Center in West Valley City, Utah.

== History ==
The franchise was founded in the Western States Hockey League as the 'Park City Moose'. After one season the team relocated to Salt Lake City and began playing out of the Accord Ice Rink in the suburb of West Valley City. In 2016, after reaching an agreement with the Utah Hockey School, the team rebranded as the Utah Outliers.

Utah was rather successful after the name change, winning at least 30 games for four consecutive years. Unfortunately, due to the COVID-19 pandemic, the WSHL not only cancelled the 2020 postseason but would not be active for the entirety of 2020–21. As a result, Utah was one of several teams to leave the league and joined the rival United States Premier Hockey League. The team became members of the Premier (Tier III) Division. After the truncated COVID season, Utah returned to its winning ways and captured back-to-back regular season titles.

In 2022, the USPHL decided to expand its Tier II footprint west and promoted the entire Mountain division to the National Collegiate Development Conference. Utah was one of the six clubs to benefit from this move and began its time in Tier II hockey in the fall of 2023.

August 29025, the Outliers announced that they will be re-locating to Park City and will play out of the Black Mountain Resort Arena. The team will retain their moniker, the Utah Outliers

== Season-by-season records ==
Season	GP	W	L	OTW	OTL	SOL	Pts	GF	GA	Regular season finish	Playoffs
WSHL
Park City Moose
2011–12	46	5	37	-	1	2	13	99	258	5th of 5, Mountain Div. 15th of 16, WSHL	Missing Information
Salt Lake City Moose
2012–13	46	13	29	-	-	4	30	116	191	5th of 5, Pacific Div. t-20th of 22, WSHL	Missing Information
2013–14	46	31	13	-	1	1	64	228	137	3rd of 6, Northwest Div. 7th of 24, WSHL	Lost Div. Semifinal series, 0–2 (Ogden Mustangs)
2014–15	46	24	16	-	5	1	54	178	163	t-4th of 7, Mountain Div. t-13th of 28, WSHL	Won Div. Quarterfinal series, 2–1 (Colorado Roughriders); Lost Div. Semifinal series, 1–2 (Casper Coyotes)
2015–16	52	25	27	-	0	-	50	158	167	5th of 7, Mountain Div. 17th of 29, WSHL	Lost Div. Quarterfinal series, 1–2 (Superior Roughriders)
Utah Outliers
2016–17	52	30	18	-	4	-	64	222	173	t-3rd of 7, Mountain Div. t-13th of 28, WSHL	Won Div. Quarterfinal series, 2–1 (Superior Roughriders); Lost Div. Semifinal series, 0–2 (Colorado Jr. Eagles)
2017–18	51	39	11	-	1	-	79	290	100	1st of 6, Mountain Div. 4th of 23, WSHL	Won Div. Semifinal series, 2–1 (Superior Roughriders); Lost Div. Final series, 0–2 (Ogden Mustangs); Lost Thorn Cup Round-Robin, 2–4 (Ogden Mustangs), 4–1 (Idaho IceCats), 3–4 (El Paso Rhinos)
2018–19	51	33	15	2	1	-	104	275	112	2nd of 5, Mountain Div. 8th of 23, WSHL	Won Div. Semifinal series, 2–0 (Casper Bobcats); Lost Div. Final series, 1–2 (Ogden Mustangs)
2019–20	51	36	11	2	2	-	114	275	112	2nd of 6, Northwest Div. 4th of 23, WSHL	Postseason cancelled
USPHL Premier
2020–21	45	24	18	-	3	-	51	159	154	t-4th of 5, Mountain Div. t-26th of 62, Premier	Won Div. Round-Robin, 1–3 (Northern Colorado Eagles), 5–3 (Pueblo Bulls), 4–2 (Ogden Mustangs); Won Div. Final, 5–3 (Pueblo Bulls); Lost National Pool C Round-Robin, 4–7 (Charlotte Rush), 2–5 (Islanders Hockey Club), 2–1 (Chicago Cougars)
2021–22	50	38	7	-	5	-	81	199	113	1st of 5, Mountain Div. 1st of 64, Premier	Won Div. Semifinal series, 2–0 (Pueblo Bulls); Won Div. Final series, 2–0 (Northern Colorado Eagles); Lost National Pool C Round-Robin, 4–1 (Metro Jets Development Program), 3–2 (OT) (Charlotte Rush), 1–5 (Northern Cyclones)
2022–23	52	43	5	-	2	2	90	255	118	1st of 6, Mountain Div. 1st of 70, Premier	Won Div. Semifinal series, 2–0 (Idaho Falls Spud Kings); Won Div. Final series, 2–0 (Ogden Mustangs); National seeding games, 0–3 (Richmond Generals), 3–1 (Minnesota Moose); Lost National Eighthfinal, 4–5 (Florida Eels)
NCDC Division
2023–24	53	36	13	-	2	2	76	189	139	2nd of 6, Mountain Conf. t–4th of 18, NCDC	Won Conf. Semifinal series, 3–1 (Provo Predators); Lost Conf. Final series, 0–3 (Ogden Mustangs)
2024–25	53	29	17	-	4	3	65	159	142	t-3rd of 6, Mountain Div. t-8th of 22, NCDC	Lost Div. Semifinal series, 1–3 (Ogden Mustangs)
2025–26	54	28	19	-	4	3	63	161	149	4th of 7, Mountain Div. 14th of 33, NCDC	Won Div. Semifinal series, 3-0 (Ogden Mustangs); Lost Div. Finals 2-3 (Grand Junction River Hawks}
