= 2012 United States Women's Curling Championship =

Curling tournament in Pennsylvania

- Host city: Philadelphia, Pennsylvania
- Arena: IceWorks Skating Complex
- Dates: February 11–18
- Winner: (Minnesota) Allison Pottinger
- Curling club: St. Paul Curling Club; St. Paul, Minnesota
- Skip: Allison Pottinger
- Third: Nicole Joraanstad
- Second: Natalie Nicholson
- Lead: Tabitha Peterson
- Finalist: (Minnesota) Cassandra Potter

The 2012 United States Women's Curling Championship took place from February 11 to 18 at the IceWorks Skating Complex in Aston, Pennsylvania (with the host city being listed as Philadelphia). It was held in conjunction with the 2012 United States Men's Curling Championship. The winning team, skipped by Allison Pottinger, will represent the United States at the 2012 Ford World Women's Curling Championship in Lethbridge, Alberta. The first and second placed teams, skipped respectively by Allison Pottinger and Cassandra Potter, earned qualification spots to the 2014 United States Olympic Curling Trials, which will determine the teams that will represent the United States at the 2014 Winter Olympics.

== Road to the Nationals ==
As with last year, teams qualified for the women's nationals by qualifying automatically through the World Curling Tour Order of Merit or through a challenge round. Four teams qualified via the Order of Merit, while six teams qualified via the challenge round. The challenge round was held in Marshfield, Wisconsin, where the teams that did not qualify directly via the Order of Merit competed for the final six spots in the nationals.

== Teams ==
The teams are listed as follows:

Skip	Third	Second	Lead	Alternate	Locale	Qualification Method
Erika Brown	Debbie McCormick	Jessica Schultz	Ann Swisshelm		Madison, Wisconsin	Order of Merit
Rebecca Hamilton	Tara Peterson	Karlie Koenig	Sophie Brorson		Madison, Wisconsin	Order of Merit
Patti Lank	Nina Spatola	Caitlin Maroldo	Molly Bonner	Mackenzie Lank	(New York (state)) Lewiston, New York	Order of Merit
Alexandra Carlson	Monica Walker	Kendall Moulton	Jordan Moulton		St. Paul, Minnesota	Order of Merit
Maureen Stolt	Megan Pond	Emilia Juocys	Sherri Schummer		St. Paul, Minnesota	Challenge Round
Cassandra Potter	Jamie Haskell	Jaclyn Lemke	Stephanie Sambor		St. Paul, Minnesota	Challenge Round
Janice Langanke	Nina Reiniger	Ashley Lawreck	Nicole Arsenault		Middletown, New Jersey	Challenge Round
Allison Pottinger	Nicole Joraanstad	Natalie Nicholson	Tabitha Peterson		St. Paul, Minnesota	Challenge Round
Aileen Sormunen	Courtney George	Amanda McLean	Miranda Solem		Duluth, Minnesota	Challenge Round
Kimberly Wapola	Victoria Forconi	Carol Strojny	Sharon Wright	Connie Kupferschmidt	St. Paul, Minnesota	Challenge Round

== Round robin standings ==
Final round robin standings

Skip	W	L	PF	PA	Ends Won	Ends Lost	Blank Ends	Stolen Ends
(Minnesota) Allison Pottinger	8	1	76	34	42	26	4	16
(Minnesota) Cassandra Potter	7	2	73	50	44	35	3	14
(Minnesota) Alexandra Carlson	6	3	67	48	40	32	9	12
(Minnesota) Aileen Sormunen	6	3	59	57	40	39	4	10
(Wisconsin) Erika Brown	5	4	58	43	37	30	8	11
(Minnesota) Maureen Stolt	5	4	60	67	37	40	5	12
(Wisconsin) Rebecca Hamilton	4	5	54	59	34	35	8	12
(New York (state)) Patti Lank	3	6	55	58	33	39	9	10
(Minnesota) Kimberly Wapola	1	8	46	85	30	41	6	6
(New Jersey) Janice Langanke	0	9	39	88	24	46	2	2

== Round robin results ==
All times listed in Eastern Standard Time.

=== Draw 1 ===
Saturday, February 11, 4:30 pm

Sheet A	1	2	3	4	5	6	7	8	9	10	Final
(New Jersey) Janice Langanke 🔨	2	0	0	0	0	1	0	0	0	X	3
(New York (state)) Patti Lank	0	2	0	2	1	0	2	1	0	X	8

Sheet B	1	2	3	4	5	6	7	8	9	10	Final
(Minnesota) Alexandra Carlson 🔨	2	0	1	0	0	1	2	5	X	X	11
(Wisconsin) Rebecca Hamilton	0	0	0	1	2	0	0	0	X	X	3

Sheet C	1	2	3	4	5	6	7	8	9	10	Final
(Minnesota) Cassandra Potter 🔨	4	2	0	1	0	1	1	0	2	X	11
(Minnesota) Maureen Stolt	0	0	2	0	1	0	0	2	0	X	5

Sheet D	1	2	3	4	5	6	7	8	9	10	Final
(Wisconsin) Erika Brown	0	2	0	1	1	0	2	4	X	X	10
(Minnesota) Kimberly Wapola 🔨	1	0	0	0	0	1	0	0	X	X	2

Sheet E	1	2	3	4	5	6	7	8	9	10	Final
(Minnesota) Aileen Sormunen	0	1	0	0	1	0	X	X	X	X	2
(Minnesota) Allison Pottinger 🔨	2	0	4	5	0	1	X	X	X	X	12

=== Draw 2 ===
Sunday, February 12, 8:00 am

Sheet A	1	2	3	4	5	6	7	8	9	10	Final
(Minnesota) Allison Pottinger 🔨	2	1	1	4	0	0	2	0	X	X	10
(Minnesota) Maureen Stolt	0	0	0	0	2	1	0	1	X	X	4

Sheet B	1	2	3	4	5	6	7	8	9	10	Final
(Minnesota) Aileen Sormunen 🔨	1	0	2	1	1	0	1	0	0	1	7
(New York (state)) Patti Lank	0	2	0	0	0	2	0	1	1	0	6

Sheet C	1	2	3	4	5	6	7	8	9	10	Final
(Minnesota) Kimberly Wapola 🔨	0	1	0	0	0	0	0	2	X	X	3
(Wisconsin) Rebecca Hamilton	0	0	3	1	2	2	2	0	X	X	10

Sheet D	1	2	3	4	5	6	7	8	9	10	Final
(Minnesota) Cassandra Potter	0	2	2	2	1	0	1	0	0	X	8
(Minnesota) Alexandra Carlson 🔨	1	0	0	0	0	2	0	1	2	X	6

Sheet E	1	2	3	4	5	6	7	8	9	10	Final
(Wisconsin) Erika Brown 🔨	3	1	1	0	3	1	X	X	X	X	9
(New Jersey) Janice Langanke	0	0	0	1	0	0	X	X	X	X	1

=== Draw 3 ===
Sunday, February 12, 4:00 pm

Sheet A	1	2	3	4	5	6	7	8	9	10	11	Final
(Minnesota) Cassandra Potter	1	0	1	1	0	2	0	1	1	0	0	7
(Wisconsin) Rebecca Hamilton 🔨	0	1	0	0	1	0	3	0	0	2	1	8

Sheet B	1	2	3	4	5	6	7	8	9	10	Final
(Minnesota) Maureen Stolt	0	1	3	0	1	0	2	0	4	X	11
(Wisconsin) Erika Brown 🔨	2	0	0	1	0	2	0	1	0	X	6

Sheet C	1	2	3	4	5	6	7	8	9	10	Final
(Minnesota) Alexandra Carlson	0	1	0	0	0	3	0	1	0	X	5
(Minnesota) Allison Pottinger 🔨	3	0	2	1	1	0	1	0	2	X	10

Sheet D	1	2	3	4	5	6	7	8	9	10	Final
(Minnesota) Aileen Sormunen 🔨	2	0	3	2	0	2	2	X	X	X	11
(New Jersey) Janice Langanke	0	1	0	0	2	0	0	X	X	X	3

Sheet E	1	2	3	4	5	6	7	8	9	10	Final
(Minnesota) Kimberly Wapola 🔨	0	0	0	0	1	0	1	0	X	X	2
(New York (state)) Patti Lank	0	2	2	3	0	2	0	1	X	X	10

=== Draw 4 ===
Monday, February 13, 8:00 am

Sheet A	1	2	3	4	5	6	7	8	9	10	Final
(New York (state)) Patti Lank 🔨	3	0	0	0	1	0	0	1	0	X	5
(Minnesota) Alexandra Carlson	0	0	2	2	0	1	2	0	1	X	8

Sheet B	1	2	3	4	5	6	7	8	9	10	Final
(New Jersey) Janice Langanke 🔨	0	0	0	5	0	2	0	3	0	X	10
(Minnesota) Kimberly Wapola	1	2	1	0	3	0	4	0	1	X	12

Sheet C	1	2	3	4	5	6	7	8	9	10	Final
(Minnesota) Aileen Sormunen	0	2	0	0	3	0	0	1	0	X	6
(Wisconsin) Erika Brown 🔨	1	0	1	1	0	3	2	0	2	X	10

Sheet D	1	2	3	4	5	6	7	8	9	10	Final
(Minnesota) Maureen Stolt	0	0	1	0	0	1	1	0	0	X	3
(Wisconsin) Rebecca Hamilton 🔨	2	2	0	0	2	0	0	3	2	X	11

Sheet E	1	2	3	4	5	6	7	8	9	10	11	Final
(Minnesota) Allison Pottinger 🔨	0	0	0	1	0	0	2	0	2	1	0	6
(Minnesota) Cassandra Potter	1	0	1	0	0	2	0	2	0	0	1	7

=== Draw 5 ===
Monday, February 13, 4:00 pm

Sheet A	1	2	3	4	5	6	7	8	9	10	Final
(Minnesota) Kimberly Wapola	0	0	1	1	1	0	1	0	1	0	5
(Minnesota) Cassandra Potter 🔨	1	1	0	0	0	2	0	1	0	3	8

Sheet B	1	2	3	4	5	6	7	8	9	10	Final
(Wisconsin) Erika Brown	0	0	0	0	0	1	1	2	0	0	4
(Minnesota) Alexandra Carlson 🔨	1	0	1	1	1	0	0	0	1	1	6

Sheet C	1	2	3	4	5	6	7	8	9	10	Final
(Minnesota) Maureen Stolt 🔨	4	0	1	0	2	1	0	1	0	X	9
(New Jersey) Janice Langanke	0	1	0	2	0	0	1	0	1	X	5

Sheet D	1	2	3	4	5	6	7	8	9	10	Final
(New York (state)) Patti Lank	0	0	1	1	0	0	0	1	0	X	3
(Minnesota) Allison Pottinger 🔨	1	1	0	0	1	1	0	0	1	X	5

Sheet E	1	2	3	4	5	6	7	8	9	10	Final
(Wisconsin) Rebecca Hamilton	0	0	1	0	0	2	1	0	1	1	6
(Minnesota) Aileen Sormunen 🔨	1	1	0	2	2	0	0	1	0	0	7

=== Draw 6 ===
Tuesday, February 14, 12:00 pm

Sheet A	1	2	3	4	5	6	7	8	9	10	Final
(Minnesota) Maureen Stolt 🔨	0	2	0	1	0	1	0	0	0	0	4
(Minnesota) Aileen Sormunen	0	0	1	0	2	0	1	0	1	1	6

Sheet B	1	2	3	4	5	6	7	8	9	10	Final
(Minnesota) Allison Pottinger 🔨	2	0	1	0	2	2	0	1	0	X	8
(New Jersey) Janice Langanke	0	1	0	1	0	0	1	0	2	X	5

Sheet C	1	2	3	4	5	6	7	8	9	10	Final
(New York (state)) Patti Lank	0	0	0	0	2	1	2	1	0	X	6
(Minnesota) Cassandra Potter 🔨	2	4	2	0	0	0	0	0	1	X	9

Sheet D	1	2	3	4	5	6	7	8	9	10	Final
(Wisconsin) Rebecca Hamilton	0	0	0	0	1	0	0	X	X	X	1
(Wisconsin) Erika Brown 🔨	1	0	0	3	0	1	1	X	X	X	6

Sheet E	1	2	3	4	5	6	7	8	9	10	Final
(Minnesota) Alexandra Carlson	0	2	0	0	3	0	1	0	3	X	9
(Minnesota) Kimberly Wapola 🔨	1	0	0	3	0	0	0	1	0	X	5

=== Draw 7 ===
Tuesday, February 14, 8:00 pm

Sheet A	1	2	3	4	5	6	7	8	9	10	Final
(Wisconsin) Rebecca Hamilton	1	1	0	0	0	1	0	2	1	2	8
(New Jersey) Janice Langanke 🔨	0	0	2	1	1	0	2	0	0	0	6

Sheet B	1	2	3	4	5	6	7	8	9	10	Final
(New York (state)) Patti Lank 🔨	3	0	0	1	1	0	0	2	0	0	7
(Minnesota) Maureen Stolt	0	1	2	0	0	1	2	0	1	1	8

Sheet C	1	2	3	4	5	6	7	8	9	10	Final
(Minnesota) Allison Pottinger 🔨	3	1	0	3	0	2	1	0	X	X	10
(Minnesota) Kimberly Wapola	0	0	2	0	2	0	0	1	X	X	5

Sheet D	1	2	3	4	5	6	7	8	9	10	Final
(Minnesota) Alexandra Carlson	0	0	1	1	1	0	0	3	0	1	7
(Minnesota) Aileen Sormunen 🔨	0	2	0	0	0	1	0	0	1	0	4

Sheet E	1	2	3	4	5	6	7	8	9	10	Final
(Minnesota) Cassandra Potter	1	0	0	1	1	0	3	1	0	X	7
(Wisconsin) Erika Brown 🔨	0	1	0	0	0	1	0	0	2	X	4

=== Draw 8 ===
Wednesday, February 15, 12:00 pm

Sheet A	1	2	3	4	5	6	7	8	9	10	Final
(Wisconsin) Erika Brown 🔨	1	0	0	1	0	1	0	0	0	X	3
(Minnesota) Allison Pottinger	0	0	1	0	1	0	3	3	2	X	7

Sheet B	1	2	3	4	5	6	7	8	9	10	Final
(Minnesota) Cassandra Potter	0	1	0	0	0	1	0	1	1	X	4
(Minnesota) Aileen Sormunen 🔨	3	0	1	2	1	0	1	0	0	X	8

Sheet C	1	2	3	4	5	6	7	8	9	10	Final
(New Jersey) Janice Langanke	0	0	2	0	2	0	X	X	X	X	4
(Minnesota) Alexandra Carlson 🔨	1	2	0	5	0	3	X	X	X	X	11

Sheet D	1	2	3	4	5	6	7	8	9	10	Final
(Minnesota) Kimberly Wapola	1	0	3	0	1	0	0	2	0	X	7
(Minnesota) Maureen Stolt 🔨	0	3	0	0	0	3	2	0	2	X	10

Sheet E	1	2	3	4	5	6	7	8	9	10	Final
(New York (state)) Patti Lank	0	4	0	0	2	0	0	0	2	0	8
(Wisconsin) Rebecca Hamilton 🔨	1	0	2	1	0	0	0	2	0	1	7

=== Draw 9 ===
Wednesday, February 15, 8:00 pm

Sheet A	1	2	3	4	5	6	7	8	9	10	Final
(Minnesota) Aileen Sormunen 🔨	1	2	0	2	0	1	0	2	0	X	8
(Minnesota) Kimberly Wapola	0	0	1	0	1	0	2	0	1	X	5

Sheet B	1	2	3	4	5	6	7	8	9	10	Final
(Wisconsin) Rebecca Hamilton	0	0	0	0	X	X	X	X	X	X	0
(Minnesota) Allison Pottinger 🔨	3	0	2	3	X	X	X	X	X	X	8

Sheet C	1	2	3	4	5	6	7	8	9	10	Final
(Wisconsin) Erika Brown	0	1	2	0	1	0	0	2	X	X	6
(New York (state)) Patti Lank	0	0	0	1	0	0	1	0	X	X	2

Sheet D	1	2	3	4	5	6	7	8	9	10	Final
(New Jersey) Janice Langanke	0	1	0	1	0	0	X	X	X	X	2
(Minnesota) Cassandra Potter 🔨	3	0	4	0	3	2	X	X	X	X	12

Sheet E	1	2	3	4	5	6	7	8	9	10	Final
(Minnesota) Maureen Stolt	0	0	1	0	1	0	1	0	2	1	6
(Minnesota) Alexandra Carlson 🔨	0	2	0	0	0	1	0	1	0	0	4

== Playoffs ==
Page playoff system
1	(Minnesota) Allison Pottinger	6
2	(Minnesota) Cassandra Potter	4
3	(Minnesota) Alexandra Carlson	2
4	(Minnesota) Aileen Sormunen	10

Semifinal
2	(Minnesota) Cassandra Potter	11
4	(Minnesota) Aileen Sormunen	9

Final
1	(Minnesota) Allison Pottinger	7
2	(Minnesota) Cassandra Potter	5

=== 1 vs. 2 game ===
Thursday, February 16, 8:00 pm

Team	1	2	3	4	5	6	7	8	9	10	11	Final
(Minnesota) Allison Pottinger 🔨	1	0	0	1	1	0	0	0	0	1	2	6
(Minnesota) Cassandra Potter	0	0	1	0	0	0	0	1	2	0	0	4

Player Percentages
(Minnesota) Allison Pottinger		(Minnesota) Cassandra Potter	
Tabitha Peterson	87%	Stephanie Sambor	85%
Natalie Nicholson	85%	Jaclyn Lemke	68%
Nicole Joraanstad	83%	Jamie Haskell	74%
Allison Pottinger	72%	Cassandra Potter	76%
Total	82%	Total	75%

=== 3 vs. 4 game ===
Thursday, February 16, 8:00 pm

Team	1	2	3	4	5	6	7	8	9	10	Final
(Minnesota) Alexandra Carlson 🔨	0	1	0	0	1	0	0	X	X	X	2
(Minnesota) Aileen Sormunen	1	0	1	2	0	2	4	X	X	X	10

Player Percentages
(Minnesota) Alexandra Carlson		(Minnesota) Aileen Sormunen	
Jordan Moulton	76%	Miranda Solem	79%
Kendall Moulton	56%	Amanda McLean	74%
Monica Walker	72%	Courtney George	78%
Alexandra Carlson	51%	Aileen Sormunen	87%
Total	64%	Total	80%

=== Semifinal ===
Friday, February 17, 4:00 pm

Team	1	2	3	4	5	6	7	8	9	10	Final
(Minnesota) Cassandra Potter 🔨	2	0	1	3	3	0	1	0	0	1	11
(Minnesota) Aileen Sormunen	0	2	0	0	0	2	0	2	3	0	9

Player Percentages
(Minnesota) Cassandra Potter		(Minnesota) Aileen Sormunen	
Stephanie Sambor	69%	Miranda Solem	85%
Jaclyn Lemke	70%	Amanda McLean	74%
Jamie Haskell	73%	Courtney George	76%
Cassandra Potter	67%	Aileen Sormunen	54%
Total	70%	Total	72%

=== Championship final ===
Saturday, February 18, 10:00 am

Team	1	2	3	4	5	6	7	8	9	10	Final
(Minnesota) Allison Pottinger 🔨	2	0	0	2	0	0	2	0	0	1	7
(Minnesota) Cassandra Potter	0	1	1	0	1	0	0	0	2	0	5

Player Percentages
(Minnesota) Allison Pottinger		(Minnesota) Cassandra Potter	
Tabitha Peterson	74%	Stephanie Sambor	81%
Natalie Nicholson	81%	Jaclyn Lemke	69%
Nicole Joraanstad	83%	Jamie Haskell	82%
Allison Pottinger	74%	Cassandra Potter	72%
Total	78%	Total	76%
