= 2012 United States Mixed Doubles Curling Championship =

- Host city: Wayland, Massachusetts
- Arena: Broomstones Curling Club
- Dates: December 7-11, 2011
- Winner: Brady Clark and Cristin Clark

The 2012 United States Mixed Doubles Curling Championship was held from December 7-11, 2011 at the Broomstones Curling Club in Wayland, Massachusetts. Brady Clark and his wife Cristin Clark won the tournament, earning the right to represent the United States at the 2012 World Mixed Doubles Curling Championship in Erzurum, Turkey.

== Teams ==
Twenty-one teams qualified to compete in the championship.

Female	Male	State(s)
Cristin Clark	Brady Clark	Washington
Joyance Meechai	Mike Calcagno	New York, Washington
Sharon Vukich	Christopher Rimple	Washington
Nikki Rossetti	Nate Clark	Massachusetts, New Hampshire
Madonna Fitzgerald	Steve Pickle	North Dakota
Kim Nawyn	Jason Nawyn	Wisconsin, Massachusetts
Therese Olson	Scott Olson	Massachusetts
Maureen Stolt	Peter Stolt	Minnesota
Miyo Konno	Steve Lundeen	Washington
Jennifer Westhagen	Andrew Ernst	Washington
Jennifer Leichter	Alex Leichter	Massachusetts
Cynthia Eng-Dinsel	David Cornfield	Washington
Danielle Buchbinder	Michael Rupp	New York
Sharon Quill	Leonard Gaines	Massachusetts, New York
Chrissy Haase	Bryan Fink	New York, Massachusetts
Em Good	Jake Vukich	Washington
Britt Rjanikov	Barry Ivy	Massachusetts, California
Nicole Vassar	Sam Williams	Massachusetts
Michelle Summer	Gary Mazzotta	Minnesota
Brigid Ellig	Daniel Metcalf	Minnesota
Stephanie Squires	Daniel Cho	Connecticut, Rhode Island

== Round robin ==
=== Standings ===
The 21 teams were split into three pools; each pool played a round robin and at the end the top two teams advanced to the playoffs. The standings at the end of the round robin phase were:

Key
Teams to playoffs
Teams to Tiebreaker

Pool A	W	L
Clark / Clark	6	0
Rossetti / Clark	4	2
Olson / Olson	3	3
Fitzgerald / Pickle	3	3
Meechai / Calcagno	2	4
Nawyn / Nawyn	2	4
Vukich / Rimple	1	5

Pool B	W	L
Leichter / Leichter	5	1
Stolt / Stolt	5	1
Eng-Dinsel / Cornfield	3	3
Konno / Lundeen	3	3
Buchbinder / Rupp	2	4
Westhagen / Ernst	2	4
Quill / Gaines	1	5

Pool C	W	L
Rjanikov / Ivy	5	1
Haase / Fink	4	2
Vassar / Williams	4	2
Good / Vukich	4	2
Ellig / Metcalf	3	3
Squires / Cho	1	5
Summer / Mazzota	0	6

=== Tiebreakers ===
Saturday, December 10, 8:00pm ET

Team	1	2	3	4	5	6	7	8	Final
Good/Vukich	0	2	0	1	0	3	0	4	10
Haase/Fink 🔨	5	0	1	0	2	0	1	0	9

Sunday, December 11, 8:00am ET

Team	1	2	3	4	5	6	7	8	Final
Vassar/Williams	0	4	0	0	2	0	0	0	6
Good/Vukich 🔨	2	0	1	1	0	2	1	1	8

== Playoffs ==
The playoffs consisted of a 6-team bracket with the top two teams directly in the semifinals. There was a two-loss provision included, such that a team was not eliminated until they had two losses in the tournament. Because the team of Brady and Cristin Clark entered the playoffs undefeated, they were not eliminated when they lost to Peter and Maureen Stolt in the semifinals and instead got to challenge the winner of the first round of the championship, Alex and Jennifer Leichter, for the title.

=== Bracket ===
Quarterfinals
Stolt/Stolt	7
Good/Vukich	2
Rjanikov/Ivy	7
Rossetti/Clark	1

Semifinals
Clark/Clark	5
Stolt/Stolt	6
Leichter/Leichter	9
Rjanikov/Ivy	2

Final: round 1
Stolt/Stolt	6
Leichter/Leichter	7

Final: round 2
Leichter/Leichter	6
Clark/Clark	9

=== Quarterfinals ===
Sunday, December 11, 11:30am ET

Team	1	2	3	4	5	6	7	8	Final
Stolt/Stolt 🔨	0	1	1	0	2	2	1	X	7
Good/Vukich	1	0	0	1	0	0	0	X	2

Team	1	2	3	4	5	6	7	8	Final
Rjanikov/Ivy	1	0	2	1	2	1	X	X	7
Rossetti/Clark 🔨	0	1	0	0	0	0	X	X	1

=== Semifinals ===
Sunday, December 11, 3:00pm ET

Team	1	2	3	4	5	6	7	8	Final
Clark/Clark 🔨	0	1	0	1	1	0	0	2	5
Stolt/Stolt	1	0	3	0	0	1	1	0	6

Team	1	2	3	4	5	6	7	8	Final
Leichter/Leichter 🔨	1	1	0	1	0	5	1	X	9
Rjanikov/Ivy	0	0	1	0	1	0	0	X	2

=== Final: round 1 ===
Sunday, December 11, 6:30pm ET

Team	1	2	3	4	5	6	7	8	Final
Stolt/Stolt 🔨	0	0	1	0	2	0	0	3	6
Leichter/Leichter	1	3	0	1	0	1	1	0	7

=== Final: round 2 ===
Sunday, December 11, 6:30pm ET

Team	1	2	3	4	5	6	7	8	Final
Leichter/Leichter 🔨	0	0	3	0	1	0	2	X	6
Clark/Clark	1	1	0	3	0	4	0	X	9
