= 2013 FSCC Early Cash =

World Curling Tour event

- Host city: Blaine, Minnesota
- Arena: Four Seasons Curling Club
- Dates: September 20–22
- Men's winner: (Wisconsin) Craig Brown
- Curling club: Madison CC, Madison
- Skip: Craig Brown
- Third: Kroy Nernberger
- Second: Matt Hamilton
- Lead: Jon Brunt
- Finalist: (Massachusetts) Korey Dropkin
- Women's winner: (Minnesota) Cory Christensen
- Skip: Cory Christensen
- Third: Rebecca Funk
- Second: Anna Bauman
- Lead: Sonja Bauman
- Finalist: (Minnesota) Cassie Potter

The 2013 FSCC Early Cash was a bonspiel that was held from September 20 to 22 at the Four Seasons Curling Club in Blaine, Minnesota as part of the 2013–14 World Curling Tour. Both the men's and women's events were being held in a round robin format. The purse for the men's event was $10,000, while the purse for the women's event was $7,000.

== Men ==
The teams are listed as follows:

=== Teams ===
| Skip | Third | Second | Lead | Locale |
|---|---|---|---|---|
| Brennan Wark (fourth) | Brian Adams, Jr. (skip) | Jordan Potts | Joel Adams | Thunder Bay, Ontario |
| Kent Beadle | Dave Jensen | Richard Maskel | Roger Smith | St. Paul, Minnesota |
| Ryan Berg | Tyler Runing | Evan Workin | Jordan Brown | West Fargo, North Dakota |
| Todd Birr | Doug Pottinger | Tom O'Connor | Troy Schroeder | Blaine, Minnesota |
| Craig Brown | Kroy Nernberger | Matt Hamilton | Jon Brunt | Madison, Wisconsin |
| Korey Dropkin | Thomas Howell | Mark Fenner | Alex Fenson | Southborough, Massachusetts |
| Stephen Dropkin | Greg Persinger | Sean Murray | Michael Graziano | St. Paul, Minnesota |
| Eric Fenson | Josh Bahr | Jon Chandler | Mark Haluptzok | Bemidji, Minnesota |
| Brian Gabrio | Barry Jass | Brian Jass | Ryan Morey | Blaine, Minnesota |
| Dale Gibbs | James Honsvall | Eric Schultz | Perry Tholl | St. Paul, Minnesota |
| Ryan Lemke | Nathan Gebert | | Casey Konopacky | Medford, Wisconsin |
| John Lilla | | Bryan Hanson | Joel Cooper (Note: Cooper is now known as JayCee due to gender transition.) | St. Paul, Minnesota |
| Ethan Meyers | Kyle Kakela | Trevor Host | Quinn Evenson | Duluth, Minnesota |
| Lyle Sieg | Andy Jukich | | Duane Rutan | (Washington (state)) Tacoma, Washington |
| Peter Stolt | Brad Caldwell | Tim Jeanetta | Matt Fowler | Plymouth, Minnesota |

=== Round Robin Standings ===
Final Round Robin Standings

Key
| Teams to Playoffs |

| Pool A | W | L |
|---|---|---|
| (Massachusetts) Korey Dropkin | 3 | 1 |
| (Wisconsin) Ryan Lemke | 3 | 1 |
| (Minnesota) Dale Gibbs | 2 | 1 |
| (Ontario) Brian Adams, Jr. | 1 | 2 |
| (North Dakota) Ryan Berg | 0 | 4 |

| Pool B | W | L |
|---|---|---|
| (Wisconsin) Craig Brown | 4 | 0 |
| (Minnesota) Eric Fenson | 3 | 1 |
| (Minnesota) John Lilla | 2 | 2 |
| (Minnesota) Peter Stolt | 1 | 3 |
| (Minnesota) Stephen Drokin | 0 | 4 |

| Pool C | W | L |
|---|---|---|
| (Minnesota) Ethan Meyers | 4 | 0 |
| (Minnesota) Todd Birr | 3 | 1 |
| (Minnesota) Kent Beadle | 2 | 2 |
| (Washington (state)) Lyle Sieg | 1 | 3 |
| (Minnesota) Brian Gabrio | 0 | 4 |

=== Playoffs ===
Quarterfinals
(Minnesota) Todd Birr | 2
(Wisconsin) Ryan Lemke | 8
(Minnesota) Eric Fenson | 5
(Massachusetts) Korey Dropkin | 6

Semifinals
(Wisconsin) Craig Brown | 8
(Wisconsin) Ryan Lemke | 5
(Minnesota) Ethan Meyers | 3
(Massachusetts) Korey Dropkin | 6

Final
(Wisconsin) Craig Brown | 6
(Massachusetts) Korey Dropkin | 1

== Women ==
=== Teams ===
The teams are listed as follows:

| Skip | Third | Second | Lead | Locale |
|---|---|---|---|---|
| Amy Lou Anderson | Shelly Kinney | Theresa Hoffoss | Julie Smith | St. Paul, Minnesota |
| Alexandra Carlson | | Emilia Juocys | Sherri Schummer | St. Paul, Minnesota |
| Cory Christensen | Rebecca Funk | Anna Bauman | Sonja Bauman | Duluth, Minnesota |
| Courtney George | Aileen Sormunen | Amanda McLean | Monica Walker | St. Paul, Minnesota |
| Jenna Haag | Erin Wallace | Grace Gabower | Brittany Falk | Janesville, Wisconsin |
| Abigayle Lindgren | Katie Sigurdson | Emily Lindgren | Kelsey Colwell | Grand Forks, North Dakota |
| Regan Mizuno | | | | Blaine, Minnesota |
| Cassie Potter | Jamie Haskell | Jackie Lemke | Steph Sambor | St. Paul, Minnesota |
| Nina Spatola | Becca Hamilton | Tara Peterson | Sophie Brorson | Madison, Wisconsin |
| Maureen Stolt | Jordan Moulton | Kendall Behm | Libby Brundage | St. Paul, Minnesota |
| Kimberly Wapola | Brigid Knowles | Jennifer Westhagen | Courtney Shaw | St. Paul, Minnesota |

=== Round Robin Standings ===
Final Round Robin Standings

Key
| Teams to Playoffs |

| Pool A | W | L |
|---|---|---|
| (Ontario) Krista McCarville | 5 | 0 |
| (Minnesota) Amy Lou Anderson | 3 | 2 |
| (Minnesota) Regan Mizuno | 3 | 2 |
| (Wisconsin) Nina Spatola | 2 | 3 |
| (Minnesota) Alexandra Carlson | 1 | 4 |
| (Wisconsin) Jenna Haag | 1 | 4 |

| Pool B | W | L |
|---|---|---|
| (Minnesota) Cassie Potter | 5 | 0 |
| (Minnesota) Cory Christensen | 3 | 2 |
| (Minnesota) Courtney George | 3 | 2 |
| (Minnesota) Maureen Stolt | 3 | 2 |
| (North Dakota) Abigayle Lindgren | 1 | 4 |
| (Minnesota) Kimberly Wapola | 0 | 5 |

=== Playoffs ===
| Semifinals | | Final |
| (Minnesota) Cassie Potter | 9 |
| (Minnesota) Amy Lou Anderson | 4 | (Minnesota) Cassie Potter | 3 |
| (Ontario) Krista McCarville | 2 | (Minnesota) Cory Christensen | 6 |
| (Minnesota) Cory Christensen | 4 |
