= 2011 United States Mixed Doubles Curling Championship =

- Host city: Duluth, Minnesota
- Arena: Duluth Curling Club
- Dates: December 9-12, 2010
- Winner: Brady Clark and Cristin Clark

The 2011 United States Mixed Doubles Curling Championship was held from December 9-12, 2010 at the Duluth Curling Club in Duluth, Minnesota. Brady Clark and Cristin Clark won the tournament, earning the right to represent the United States at the 2011 World Mixed Doubles Curling Championship in St. Paul, Minnesota.

== Teams ==
Twenty teams qualified to compete in the championship.

Female	Male	State(s)
Cristin Clark	Brady Clark	Washington
Em Good	Jake Vukich	Washington
Pam Cavers	Andrew Jukich	Minnesota
Michelle Summer	Gary Mazzotta	Minnesota
Joyance Meechai	Jason Nawyn	New York, Massachusetts
Jennifer Westhagen	Andrew Ernst	Washington
Elizabeth Busche	Keane Busche	Minnesota
Courtney George	Tyler George	Minnesota
Maureen Stolt	Peter Stolt	Minnesota
Sophie Brorson	Jared Zezel	Minnesota
Cynthia Eng-Dinsel	David Cornfield	Washington
Kimberly Wapola	Michael Floerchinger	Minnesota
Julie Smith	Eric Schultz	Minnesota
Heather Van Sistine	Brett Charpentier	Wisconsin, Minnesota
Sharon Vukich	Mike Calcagno	Washington
Norma O'Leary	Phil DeVore	Minnesota, Wisconsin
Amy Lou Anderson	Jim Ivey	Minnesota
Liv Johnson	Tim Johnson	Minnesota
Senja Lopac	Clayton Orvik	Minnesota
Madonna Fitzgerald	Steve Pickle	North Dakota

== Round robin ==
The 20 teams were split into three pools; each pool played a round robin and at the end the top two teams advanced to the playoffs.

Key
Teams to playoffs

Pool A Clark / Clark Good / Vukich Cavers / Jukich Summer / Mazzotta Meechai / Nawyn Westhagen / Ernst Busche / Busche	Pool B George / George Stolt / Stolt Brorson / Zezel Eng-Dinsel / Cornfield Wapola / Floerchinger Smith / Schultz Van Sistine/ Charpentier	Pool C Vukich / Calcagno O'Leary / DeVore Anderson / Ivey Johnson / Johnson Lopac / Orvik Fitzgerald / Pickle

== Playoffs ==
The playoffs consisted of a 6-team bracket with the top two teams directly in the semifinals. There was a two-loss provision included, such that a team was not eliminated until they had two losses in the tournament. Because the team of Clayton Orvik and Senja Lopac entered the playoffs undefeated, they were not eliminated when they lost to Courtney and Tyler George in the semifinals and instead got to challenge the winner of the first round of the championship, Brady and Cristin Clark, for the title.

=== Bracket ===
Quarterfinals
Brorson/Zezel	10
O'Leary/DeVore	6
Good/Vukich	0
George/George	12

Semifinals
Clark/Clark	9
Brorson/Zezel	7
Lopac/Orvik	5
George/George	9

Final: round 1
Clark/Clark	7
George/George	2

Final: round 2
Clark/Clark	9
Lopac/Orvik	4
