= 2012 United States Women's Curling Championship – Qualification =

Qualification for the 2012 United States Women's Curling Championship took place in one round in January in Marshfield, Wisconsin. The number of entrants to the national championships was cut down to ten teams through a challenge round.

== Qualification System ==
Teams qualified for the women's nationals either by qualifying automatically as one of the top four teams on the World Curling Tour Order of Merit or by qualifying through the challenge round. The four teams that qualified automatically to the championships, an increase from last year's two teams qualified through the Order of Merit, were chosen based on the Order of Merit upon the conclusion of the Curl Mesabi Cash Spiel. This year, the teams are those skipped by Erika Brown, Rebecca Hamilton, Patti Lank, and Alexandra Carlson. The other six spots in the nationals will be awarded through competition in the challenge round.

The challenge round was held with the double knockout provision in place. The double knockout provision states that a team is eliminated from qualifying for the nationals if the team has at least two losses in their win-loss record. If there are teams with less than two losses, they will play each other until the number of teams still able to qualify matches the number of qualification spots available.

=== Challenge round ===
Since there are more than ten teams registered to the nationals this year, the teams that did not qualify directly for the nationals competed to earn one of six remaining spots in the nationals through the challenge round, which was held from January 19 to 22 in Marshfield, Wisconsin. The challenge round was held in a knockout format, as decided by the organizing committee. The teams that advanced from the challenge round were those skipped by Maureen Stolt, Cassandra Potter, Janice Langanke, Allison Pottinger, Aileen Sormunen, Kimberly Wapola.

== Challenge round ==
The challenge round was held from January 19 to 22 at the Marshfield Curling Club in Marshfield, Wisconsin. It was held in a triple knockout format. Teams skipped by Maureen Stolt, Cassandra Potter, Janice Langanke, Allison Pottinger, Aileen Sormunen, and Kimberly Wapola advanced to the Nationals.

=== Participating teams ===
The following is a list of all teams registered to participate in the regional qualifiers.

Key
Teams Directly to Nationals

Skip	Third	Second	Lead	Alternate	Locale
Erika Brown	Debbie McCormick	Jessica Schultz	Ann Swisshelm		Madison, Wisconsin
Alexandra Carlson	Monica Walker	Kendall Moulton	Jordan Moulton		St. Paul, Minnesota
Cristin Clark	Emily Good	Elle LeBeau	Sharon Vukich		(Washington (state)) Seattle, Washington
Brigid Ellig	Jennifer Westhagen	Heather Van Sistine	Brittany Falk		St. Paul, Minnesota
Rebecca Hamilton	Tara Peterson	Karlie Koenig	Sophie Brorson		Madison, Wisconsin
Shelly Kinney	Amy Lou Anderson	Elyse Sorenson	Julie Smith		St. Paul, Minnesota
Janice Langanke	Ashley Lawreck	Nina Reiniger	Nicole Arsenault		Middletown, New Jersey
Patti Lank	Nina Spatola	Caitlin Maroldo	Molly Bonner	Mackenzie Lank	(New York (state)) Lewiston, New York
Cassandra Potter	Jamie Haskell	Jaclyn Lemke	Stephanie Sambor		St. Paul, Minnesota
Allison Pottinger	Nicole Joraanstad	Natalie Nicholson	Tabitha Peterson		St. Paul, Minnesota
Nicole Reiser	Michelle Wagner	Gabrielle Coleman	Ann Drummie		Mandan, North Dakota
Aileen Sormunen	Courtney George	Amanda McLean	Miranda Solem		Duluth, Minnesota
Maureen Stolt	Megan Pond	Emilia Juocys	Sherri Schummer		St. Paul, Minnesota
Amanda Tucker	Randi Schieber	Alex Schieber	Rachel Tharalson		St. Thomas, North Dakota
Kimberly Wapola	Victoria Forconi	Carol Strojny	Sharon Wright	Connie Kupferschmidt	St. Paul, Minnesota

=== Knockout Brackets ===
==== A Event ====
First Knockout
(New Jersey) Janice Langanke	6
(Minnesota) Kimberly Wapola	3

Semifinals
(New Jersey) Janice Langanke	6
(Minnesota) Allison Pottinger	5
(Minnesota) Maureen Stolt	5
(Washington (state)) Cristin Clark	2

Qualifier 1
(New Jersey) Janice Langanke	5
(Minnesota) Maureen Stolt	7

First Knockout
(Minnesota) Shelly Kinney	9
(North Dakota) Amanda Tucker	8
(North Dakota) Nicole Reiser	W
(Minnesota) Brigid Ellig	L

Semifinals
(Minnesota) Shelly Kinney	2
(Minnesota) Cassandra Potter	9
(North Dakota) Nicole Reiser	8
(Minnesota) Aileen Sormunen	9

Qualifier 2
(Minnesota) Cassandra Potter	10
(Minnesota) Aileen Sormunen	7

==== B Event ====
Second Knockout		Semifinals		Qualifier 3
(Minnesota) Kimberly Wapola	8
(North Dakota) Nicole Reiser	6	(Minnesota) Kimberly Wapola	8
		(Minnesota) Shelly Kinney	7
				(Minnesota) Kimberly Wapola	4
				(New Jersey) Janice Langanke	11

Second Knockout
(North Dakota) Amanda Tucker	13
(Minnesota) Brigid Ellig	4

Quarterfinals
(North Dakota) Amanda Tucker	7
(Washington (state)) Cristin Clark	1

Semifinals
(North Dakota) Amanda Tucker	3
(Minnesota) Allison Pottinger	7

Qualifier 4
(Minnesota) Allison Pottinger	7
(Minnesota) Aileen Sormunen	3

==== C Event ====
Third Knockout		Qualifier 5
(Minnesota) Shelly Kinney	10
(Washington (state)) Cristin Clark	6	(Minnesota) Shelly Kinney	5
		(Minnesota) Aileen Sormunen	11

Third Knockout		Semifinals		Qualifier 6
(North Dakota) Nicole Reiser	7
(Minnesota) Brigid Ellig	8	(Minnesota) Brigid Ellig	9
		(North Dakota) Amanda Tucker	4
				(Minnesota) Brigid Ellig	8
				(Minnesota) Kimberly Wapola	10

=== Knockout results ===
==== Draw 1 ====
Friday, January 20, 2:00 pm

Sheet 1	1	2	3	4	5	6	7	8	9	10	Final
(New Jersey) Janice Langanke	0	0	0	1	1	0	3	1	0	X	6
(Minnesota) Kimberly Wapola 🔨	0	2	0	0	0	0	0	0	1	X	3

Sheet 2	1	2	3	4	5	6	7	8	9	10	Final
(Minnesota) Shelly Kinney	2	1	0	1	0	0	2	1	2	0	9
(North Dakota) Amanda Tucker 🔨	0	0	2	0	5	0	0	0	0	1	8

Sheet 3	Final
(North Dakota) Nicole Reiser	W
(Minnesota) Brigid Ellig	L

Team Ellig was unable to field four registered players to start the competition, by rule an automatic forfeit.

==== Draw 2 ====
Friday, January 20, 7:00 pm

Sheet 1	1	2	3	4	5	6	7	8	9	10	Final
(Minnesota) Maureen Stolt	0	0	2	0	1	1	1	0	0	X	5
(Washington (state)) Cristin Clark 🔨	0	1	0	0	0	0	0	1	0	X	2

Sheet 2	1	2	3	4	5	6	7	8	9	10	Final
(New Jersey) Janice Langanke	0	0	0	1	2	1	0	1	0	1	6
(Minnesota) Allison Pottinger 🔨	0	0	2	0	0	0	1	0	2	0	5

Sheet 3	1	2	3	4	5	6	7	8	9	10	Final
(Minnesota) Shelly Kinney 🔨	1	0	0	0	1	0	0	X	X	X	2
(Minnesota) Cassandra Potter	0	0	5	1	0	1	2	X	X	X	9

==== Draw 3 ====
Saturday, January 21, 9:00 am

Sheet 1	1	2	3	4	5	6	7	8	9	10	Final
(New Jersey) Janice Langanke	0	0	1	0	1	0	0	3	0	0	5
(Minnesota) Maureen Stolt 🔨	0	2	0	1	0	0	1	0	1	2	7

Sheet 2	1	2	3	4	5	6	7	8	9	10	11	Final
(North Dakota) Nicole Reiser 🔨	1	0	1	0	1	1	0	0	2	2	0	8
(Minnesota) Aileen Sormunen	0	3	0	2	0	0	3	0	0	0	1	9

Sheet 3	1	2	3	4	5	6	7	8	9	10	Final
(North Dakota) Amanda Tucker 🔨	2	3	0	3	0	2	0	1	2	X	13
(Minnesota) Brigid Ellig	0	0	2	0	1	0	1	0	0	X	4

==== Draw 4 ====
Saturday, January 21, 2:00 pm

Sheet 1	1	2	3	4	5	6	7	8	9	10	Final
(Minnesota) Cassandra Potter	2	1	0	2	0	0	4	0	1	X	10
(Minnesota) Aileen Sormunen	0	0	3	0	2	0	0	2	0	X	7

Sheet 2	1	2	3	4	5	6	7	8	9	10	Final
(North Dakota) Amanda Tucker	0	1	0	1	2	1	2	X	X	X	7
(Washington (state)) Cristin Clark 🔨	0	0	1	0	0	0	0	X	X	X	1

Sheet 3	1	2	3	4	5	6	7	8	9	10	Final
(Minnesota) Kimberly Wapola 🔨	1	0	0	1	1	0	0	0	3	2	8
(North Dakota) Nicole Reiser	0	0	2	0	0	2	1	1	0	0	6

==== Draw 5 ====
Saturday, January 21, 7:00 pm

Sheet 1	1	2	3	4	5	6	7	8	9	10	11	Final
(North Dakota) Nicole Reiser 🔨	1	1	0	2	0	0	1	1	0	1	0	7
(Minnesota) Brigid Ellig	0	0	3	0	3	1	0	0	0	0	1	8

Sheet 2	1	2	3	4	5	6	7	8	9	10	Final
(Minnesota) Kimberly Wapola 🔨	0	1	0	0	2	0	0	1	0	4	8
(Minnesota) Shelly Kinney	1	0	2	1	0	1	0	0	2	0	7

Sheet 3	1	2	3	4	5	6	7	8	9	10	Final
(North Dakota) Amanda Tucker	0	0	0	1	0	1	1	0	0	X	3
(Minnesota) Allison Pottinger 🔨	0	0	1	0	3	0	0	2	1	X	7

==== Draw 6 ====
Sunday, January 22, 8:00 am

Sheet 1	1	2	3	4	5	6	7	8	9	10	Final
(Minnesota) Kimberly Wapola	1	0	0	1	0	2	0	X	X	X	4
(New Jersey) Janice Langanke 🔨	0	2	1	0	6	0	2	X	X	X	11

Sheet 2	1	2	3	4	5	6	7	8	9	10	Final
(Minnesota) Allison Pottinger	0	2	0	1	1	0	0	1	2	X	7
(Minnesota) Aileen Sormunen 🔨	1	0	1	0	0	1	0	0	0	X	3

Sheet 3	1	2	3	4	5	6	7	8	9	10	Final
(Minnesota) Shelly Kinney	0	3	1	0	1	2	0	1	0	2	10
(Washington (state)) Cristin Clark 🔨	3	0	0	1	0	0	1	0	1	0	6

==== Draw 7 ====
Sunday, January 22, 1:00 pm

Sheet 1	1	2	3	4	5	6	7	8	9	10	Final
(Minnesota) Shelly Kinney 🔨	0	1	0	2	0	2	0	X	X	X	5
(Minnesota) Aileen Sormunen	1	0	3	0	4	0	3	X	X	X	11

Sheet 3	1	2	3	4	5	6	7	8	9	10	Final
(Minnesota) Brigid Ellig	0	3	0	0	1	2	2	0	1	X	9
(North Dakota) Amanda Tucker 🔨	2	0	0	1	0	0	0	1	0	X	4

==== Draw 8 ====
Sunday, January 22, 6:00 pm

Sheet 2	1	2	3	4	5	6	7	8	9	10	11	Final
(Minnesota) Brigid Ellig 🔨	1	0	0	0	1	2	0	2	0	2	0	8
(Minnesota) Kimberly Wapola	0	1	3	1	0	0	2	0	1	0	2	10
