= 2014 United States Women's Curling Championship – Qualification =

Qualification for the 2014 United States Women's Curling Championship consisted of three different paths. Four teams qualified directly through the High Performance Program or the Order of Merit system. The number of the remaining entrants to the national championships was cut down to six teams through a challenge round held in early January.

== Qualification system ==
Teams can qualify to participate in the men's national championship through the High Performance Program, through the World Curling Tour Order of Merit, or through a challenge round.

Two spots in the nationals were awarded to two teams on the United States Curling Association's High Performance National Program. The teams qualified through the High Performance Program were those skipped by Allison Pottinger and Cassandra Potter. Two more spots were awarded to the top two men's teams on the World Curling Tour Order of Merit standings table at the year's end. The teams qualified through the Order of Merit were those skipped by Courtney George and Nina Spatola.

The remaining six spots in the nationals will be awarded to the teams that earn qualification spots through the challenge round. The challenge round will be held in a triple knockout format.

== Challenge round ==
The challenge round for the women's nationals will be held from January 10 to 12 at the Grafton Curling Club in Grafton, North Dakota.

=== Teams ===
Skip	Third	Second	Lead	Locale
Amy Lou Anderson	Megan Delaney	Theresa Hoffoss	Julie Smith	St. Paul, Minnesota
Sarah Anderson	Courtney Anderson-Slata	Taylor Anderson	Emily Anderson	Philadelphia, Pennsylvania
Alexandra Carlson	Jamie Sinclair	Emilia Juocys	Sherri Schummer	St. Paul, Minnesota
Em Good	Elle LeBeau	Gabrielle Coleman	Cynthia Eng-Dinsel	(Washington (state)) Seattle, Washington
Davinna Kong	Susan Mitchell	Miranda Heaslip	Donna Umali-Mendoza	San Francisco, California
Abigayle Lindgren	Katie Sigurdson	Emily Lindgren	Kelsey Colwell	Grand Forks, North Dakota
Caitlin Maroldo	Rebeca Andrew	Abigail Morrison	Emily Walker	Rochester, Minnesota
Maureen Stolt	Jordan Moulton	Kendall Behm	Libby Brundage	St. Paul, Minnesota
Kimberly Wapola	Jennifer Westhagen	Jenn Cahak	Courtney Shaw	St. Paul, Minnesota

=== Knockout Draw Brackets ===
==== A Event ====
First Knockout
(California) Davinna Kong	4
(North Dakota) Abigayle Lindgren	9

Semifinals
(North Dakota) Abigayle Lindgren	9
(Minnesota) Maureen Stolt	4
(Pennsylvania) Sarah Anderson	5
(Minnesota) Caitlin Maroldo	9

Qualifier 1
(North Dakota) Abigayle Lindgren	3
(Minnesota) Caitlin Maroldo	10

First Knockout	Semifinals		Qualifier 2
	(Minnesota) Kimberly Wapola	5
	(Minnesota) Alexandra Carlson	6
			(Minnesota) Alexandra Carlson	8
			(Minnesota) Amy Lou Anderson	2
	(Washington (state)) Em Good	5
	(Minnesota) Amy Lou Anderson	7

==== B Event ====
Second Knockout
(California) Davinna Kong	7
(Washington (state)) Em Good	5

Semifinals
(California) Davinna Kong	5
(Minnesota) Kimberly Wapola	9

Qualifier 3
(Minnesota) Kimberly Wapola	3
(North Dakota) Abigayle Lindgren	9

Second Knockout		Qualifier 4
(Pennsylvania) Sarah Anderson	8
(Minnesota) Maureen Stolt	7	(Pennsylvania) Sarah Anderson	5
		(Minnesota) Amy Lou Anderson	8

==== C Event ====
Qualifier 5
(Pennsylvania) Sarah Anderson	9
(California) Davinna Kong	6

Third Knockout		Qualifier 6
		(Minnesota) Kimberly Wapola	5
(Washington (state)) Em Good	8	(Washington (state)) Em Good	10
(Minnesota) Maureen Stolt	6

=== Knockout results ===
==== Draw 1 ====
Friday, January 10, 7:00 pm

Team	1	2	3	4	5	6	7	8	9	10	Final
(California) Davinna Kong	0	1	0	1	0	0	0	2	X	X	4
(North Dakota) Abigayle Lindgren 🔨	1	0	3	0	1	2	2	0	X	X	9

Team	1	2	3	4	5	6	7	8	9	10	Final
(Pennsylvania) Sarah Anderson	0	2	0	0	2	0	0	1	X	X	5
(Minnesota) Caitlin Maroldo 🔨	2	0	2	2	0	1	2	0	X	X	9

Team	1	2	3	4	5	6	7	8	9	10	Final
(Minnesota) Kimberly Wapola 🔨	2	0	0	0	1	0	0	1	0	1	5
(Minnesota) Alexandra Carlson	0	1	0	1	0	1	1	0	2	0	6

Team	1	2	3	4	5	6	7	8	9	10	Final
(Washington (state)) Em Good	0	0	2	0	1	1	0	0	0	1	5
(Minnesota) Amy Lou Anderson 🔨	2	2	0	1	0	0	0	1	1	0	7

==== Draw 2 ====
Saturday, January 11, 9:00 am

Team	1	2	3	4	5	6	7	8	9	10	Final
(North Dakota) Abigayle Lindgren 🔨	2	0	1	3	1	0	0	2	X	X	9
(Minnesota) Maureen Stolt	0	1	0	0	0	1	2	0	X	X	4

Team	1	2	3	4	5	6	7	8	9	10	Final
(California) Davinna Kong	1	1	0	1	0	0	1	0	1	2	7
(Washington (state)) Em Good 🔨	0	0	2	0	1	1	0	1	0	0	5

==== Draw 3 ====
Saturday, January 11, 2:00 pm

Team	1	2	3	4	5	6	7	8	9	10	Final
(North Dakota) Abigayle Lindgren	0	0	2	0	0	1	0	X	X	X	3
(Minnesota) Caitlin Maroldo 🔨	4	0	0	2	1	0	3	X	X	X	10

Team	1	2	3	4	5	6	7	8	9	10	Final
(Minnesota) Alexandra Carlson	0	5	1	0	1	1	X	X	X	X	8
(Minnesota) Amy Lou Anderson 🔨	1	0	0	1	0	0	X	X	X	X	2

Team	1	2	3	4	5	6	7	8	9	10	Final
(California) Davinna Kong 🔨	0	0	1	0	0	2	1	0	1	0	5
(Minnesota) Kimberly Wapola	0	1	0	1	1	0	0	1	0	5	9

Team	1	2	3	4	5	6	7	8	9	10	Final
(Pennsylvania) Sarah Anderson 🔨	0	2	1	0	1	0	0	4	0	0	8
(Minnesota) Maureen Stolt	0	0	0	2	0	1	1	0	1	2	7

==== Draw 4 ====
Saturday, January 11, 7:00 pm

Team	1	2	3	4	5	6	7	8	9	10	Final
(Minnesota) Kimberly Wapola	0	0	1	0	1	0	0	1	0	X	3
(North Dakota) Abigayle Lindgren 🔨	1	0	0	2	0	2	1	0	3	X	9

Team	1	2	3	4	5	6	7	8	9	10	Final
(Pennsylvania) Sarah Anderson	0	0	0	2	0	2	0	0	1	X	5
(Minnesota) Amy Lou Anderson 🔨	3	1	1	0	1	0	1	1	0	X	8

Team	1	2	3	4	5	6	7	8	9	10	Final
(Washington (state)) Em Good 🔨	3	0	1	0	1	1	0	2	0	0	8
(Minnesota) Maureen Stolt	0	1	0	2	0	0	2	0	1	0	6

==== Draw 5 ====
Sunday, January 12, 9:00 am

Team	1	2	3	4	5	6	7	8	9	10	Final
(Pennsylvania) Sarah Anderson 🔨	2	0	0	3	1	1	2	0	0	X	9
(California) Davinna Kong	0	2	2	0	0	0	0	1	1	X	6

Team	1	2	3	4	5	6	7	8	9	10	Final
(Minnesota) Kimberly Wapola	0	1	0	0	1	0	2	0	1	X	5
(Washington (state)) Em Good	1	0	2	1	0	2	0	4	0	X	10
