= 2013 United States Mixed Doubles Curling Championship =

- Host city: Bismarck, North Dakota
- Arena: Capital Curling Club
- Dates: December 6–9, 2012
- Winner: Maureen Stolt and Peter Stolt

The 2013 United States Mixed Doubles Curling Championship was held from December 6–9, 2012 at the Capital Curling Club in Bismarck, North Dakota. Maureen Stolt and her husband Peter Stolt won the tournament, earning the right to represent the United States at the 2013 World Mixed Doubles Curling Championship in Fredericton, New Brunswick.

== Teams ==
Seventeen teams qualified to compete in the championship.

Female	Male	State(s)
Danielle Buchbinder	Michael Rupp	New York
Brett Charpentier	Jennifer Westhagen	Minnesota
Cristin Clark	Brady Clark	Washington
Carol Strojny	Timothy Doherty	Minnesota
Kimberly Wapola	Michael Floerchinger	Minnesota
Cynthia Smith	Russel Heier	North Dakota
Britt Rjanikov	Barry Ivy	Massachusetts, California
Tina Kelly	Andy Jukich	Minnesota
Dena Rosenberry	Darrick Kizlyk	Colorado
Miyo Konno	Steve Lundeen	Washington
Jesa Legacie	Ryan Flippo	North Dakota
Carmen Delaney	Gary Mazzota	Minnesota
Therese Olson	Scott Olson	Massachusetts
Madonna Fitzgeraid	Steve Pickle	North Dakota
Jillian Walker	Tucker Smith	North Dakota
Maureen Stolt	Peter Stolt	Minnesota
Sarah Felchle	Todd Ussatis	North Dakota

== Round robin ==
=== Standings ===
The 17 teams were split into three pools; each pool played a round robin and at the end the top two teams advanced to the playoffs. The standings at the end of the round robin phase were:

Key
Teams to playoffs
Teams to Tiebreaker

Pool A	W	L
Olson / Olson	4	1
Clark / Clark	4	1
Rosenberry / Kizlyk	4	1
Konno / Lundeen	2	3
Fitzgeraid / Pickle	1	4
Westhagen / Charpentier	0	5

Pool B	W	L
Stolt / Stolt	5	0
Strojny / Doherty	4	1
Smith / Heier	2	3
Walker / Smith	2	3
Legacie / Flippo	1	4
Flechle / Ussatis	1	4

Pool C	W	L
Kelly / Jukich	3	1
Wapola / Floerchinger	3	1
Rjanikov / Ivy	3	1
Buchbinder / Rupp	1	3
Delaney / Mazzota	0	4

=== Tiebreakers ===
Saturday, December 8, 8:00pm CT

Pool A

Team	1	2	3	4	5	6	7	8	Final
Rosenberry/Kizlyk	0	0	0	0	0	1	X	X	1
Clark/Clark	3	1	2	1	1	0	X	X	8

Pool C

Team	1	2	3	4	5	6	7	8	Final
Rjanikov/Ivy	4	1	1	0	1	0	1	0	8
Wapola/Floerchinger	0	0	0	2	0	1	0	3	6

== Playoffs ==
The playoffs consisted of a 6-team bracket with the top two teams receiving byes in the quarterfinals.

=== Bracket ===
Quarterfinals
Strojny/Doherty	8
Clark/Clark	5
'Kelly/Jukich	10
Rjanikov/Ivy	1

Semifinals
Stolt/Stolt	6
Strojny/Doherty	4
Olson/Olson	5
Kelly/Jukich	9

Final
Stolt/Stolt	6
Kelly/Jukich	3

=== Quarterfinals ===
Sunday, December 9, 9:00am CT

Team	1	2	3	4	5	6	7	8	Final
Strojny/Doherty	2	1	0	4	0	0	0	1	8
Clark/Clark	0	0	1	0	1	1	2	0	5

Team	1	2	3	4	5	6	7	8	Final
Kelly/Jukich	4	2	1	0	2	1	X	X	10
Rjanikov/Ivy	0	0	0	1	0	0	X	X	1

=== Semifinals ===
Sunday, December 9, 1:00pm CT

Team	1	2	3	4	5	6	7	8	Final
Stolt/Stolt	1	0	2	1	0	1	1	0	6
Strojny/Doherty	0	1	0	0	1	0	0	2	4

Team	1	2	3	4	5	6	7	8	Final
Olson/Olson	1	1	0	2	0	1	0	0	5
Kelly/Jukich	0	0	4	0	2	0	2	1	9

=== Finals ===
Sunday, December 9, 5:00pm CT

Team	1	2	3	4	5	6	7	8	Final
Stolt/Stolt	0	2	3	1	X	X	X	X	6
Kelly/Jukich	3	0	0	0	X	X	X	X	3
