= United States Mixed Doubles Curling Championship =

National curling championship

- Established: 2007
- 2026 host city: Bemidji, Minnesota
- 2026 arena: Bemidji Curling Club
- 2026 champion: (North Dakota) Rachel Kawleski / Connor Kauffman

Current edition
- 2026 United States Mixed Doubles Curling Championship

The United States Mixed Doubles Curling Championship is the national curling championship for mixed doubles curling in the United States. The winning team in the tournament represents the United States at that year's World Mixed Doubles Curling Championship.

== History ==
The 2021 Championship was originally planned to be held February 28 to March 6, 2021 at Great Park Ice & FivePoint Arena in Irvine, California and also be the Mixed Doubles Olympic Trials for the 2022 Winter Olympics. In December, 2020, the USCA announced that all remaining 2020–21 events would be either cancelled or postponed until late spring 2021. This postponement delayed the Mixed Doubles Championship until after the 2021 World Mixed Doubles Championship and so the 2020 champions, Tabitha Peterson and Joe Polo, were selected to represent the United States. This gave the team the opportunity to compete at Worlds which they missed the previous year when the 2020 World Mixed Doubles Championship was cancelled due to the COVID-19 pandemic. On March 29, 2021 it was announced that the 2021 Mixed Doubles Championship will be held in conjunction with the Women's Nationals and Men's Nationals in a bio-secure bubble at Wausau Curling Club in Wausau, Wisconsin in May, 2021. Due to the pandemic, it was decided to separate the 2021 Mixed Doubles Olympic Trials from the National Championship and delay the trials until fall 2021.

== Format and qualification ==
As of 2019, the event consists of twelve teams participating in a two-pool preliminary round-robin, with the top three teams in each pool advancing to the playoffs. Qualification for the event is as follows:

- Previous national mixed doubles champion qualifies,
- Previous Olympic team qualifies,
- Two teams qualify based on being the top American finishers in two designated mixed doubles bonspiels,
- Four teams qualify based on standings in the World Curling Tour order of merit,
- One team may qualify based on the discretion of the USCA Director of Coaching, and
- Three or four teams qualify based on performance in the Mixed Doubles Challenge Round tournament.

== Past champions ==
Year	Winning team	Runner-up team	Host
2008	(Minnesota) Jamie Haskell / Nate Haskell	Charrissa Lin / Derek Surka	Bemidji, MN
2009	(Washington (state)) Cristin Clark / Brady Clark	(Minnesota) Jamie Haskell / Nate Haskell	Two Harbors, MN
2010	(Washington (state)) Sharon Vukich / Mike Calcagno	(Washington (state)) Cristin Clark / Sean Beighton	Seattle, WA
2011	(Washington (state)) Cristin Clark / Brady Clark	(Minnesota) Senja Lopac / Clayton Orvik	Duluth, MN
2012	(Washington (state)) Cristin Clark / Brady Clark	(Massachusetts) Jennifer Leichter / Alex Leichter	Wayland, MA
2013	(Minnesota) Maureen Stolt / Peter Stolt	(Minnesota) Tina Kelly / Andy Jukich	Bismarck, ND
2014	(New York (state)) Joyance Meechai / (Minnesota) Steve Gebauer	(Minnesota) Maureen Stolt / Peter Stolt	Medford, WI
2015	(Minnesota) Sarah Anderson / Korey Dropkin	(Minnesota) Maureen Stolt / Peter Stolt	Eau Claire, WI
2016	(Minnesota) Jessica Schultz / Jason Smith	(Minnesota) Allison Pottinger / Doug Pottinger	Denver, CO
2017	(Wisconsin) Becca Hamilton / Matt Hamilton	(Minnesota) Tabitha Peterson / Joe Polo	Blaine, MN
2018	(Minnesota) Sarah Anderson / Korey Dropkin	(Minnesota) Maureen Stolt / Peter Stolt	Eau Claire, WI
2019	(Minnesota) Cory Christensen / John Shuster	(Alaska) Vicky Persinger / (Minnesota) Chris Plys	Seattle, WA
2020	(Minnesota) Tabitha Peterson / Joe Polo	(Minnesota) Cory Christensen / John Shuster	Bemidji, MN
2021	(Alaska) Vicky Persinger / (Minnesota) Chris Plys	(Minnesota) Madison Bear / Andrew Stopera	Wausau, WI
2022	(Wisconsin) Becca Hamilton / Matt Hamilton	(Minnesota) Monica Walker / Andrew Stopera	Middleton, WI
2023	(Minnesota) Cory Thiesse / Korey Dropkin	(Minnesota) Sarah Anderson / (New York (state)) Andrew Stopera	Kalamazoo, MI
2024	(Wisconsin) Becca Hamilton / Matt Hamilton	(Minnesota) Cory Thiesse / Korey Dropkin	Traverse City, MI
2026	(North Dakota) Rachel Kawleski / Connor Kauffman	(Minnesota) Ella Fleming / Jackson Bestland	Bemidji, MN
