= 2026 United States Mixed Doubles Curling Championship =

- Host city: Bemidji, Minnesota
- Arena: Bemidji Curling Club
- Dates: January 20–25
- Winner: (North Dakota) Kawleski / Kauffman
- Female: Rachel Kawleski
- Male: Connor Kauffman
- Finalist: (Minnesota) Fleming / Bestland

The 2026 United States Mixed Doubles Curling Championship was held from January 20 to 25, at the Bemidji Curling Club in Bemidji, Minnesota. The championship featured sixteen teams, split into two pools of eight teams. After a round-robin within each pool, the top three teams from each pool advanced to a single-elimination playoff bracket.

The winning pair of Rachel Kawleski and Connor Kauffman will represent the United States at the 2026 World Mixed Doubles Curling Championship in Geneva, Switzerland.

Of note, the Olympic mixed doubles team of Cory Thiesse and Korey Dropkin did not compete as the event was held a week prior to the start of the 2026 Winter Olympics.

== Teams ==
The teams are listed as follows:

| Female | Male | Locale |
|---|---|---|
| Gabrielle Coleman | Connor Robertson | Oakland, California |
| Susan Dudt | Daniel Dudt | Malvern, Pennsylvania |
| Sarah Fenson | Andrew Stopera | Minneapolis, Minnesota |
| Ella Fleming | Jackson Bestland | Chaska, Minnesota |
| Bella Hagenbuch | Daniel Laufer | Utica, Illinois |
| Heidi Holt | Zachary Brenden | Bismarck, North Dakota |
| Rachel Kawleski | Connor Kauffman | Fargo, North Dakota |
| Rilee Kraft | Cayden Kraft | Bismarck, North Dakota |
| Christine McMakin | Samuel Strouse | Fargo, North Dakota |
| Clare Moores | Lance Wheeler | Golden, Colorado |
| Kelsey Ostrowski | Gabriel Nickel | Saint Paul, Minnesota |
| Ann Podoll | Nathan Parry | Fargo, North Dakota |
| Harley Scebbi | Vincent Scebbi | Cleveland, Ohio |
| Stephanie Senneker | Nicholas Visnich | Port Huron, Michigan |
| BriAnna Weldon | Sean Franey | Denver, Colorado |
| Ella Wendling | Benji Paral | Eau Claire, Wisconsin |

== Round robin standings ==
Final Round Robin Standings

Key
| Teams to Playoffs |
| Teams to Tiebreaker |

| Pool A | W | L |
|---|---|---|
| (Minnesota) Fenson / Stopera | 7 | 0 |
| (Minnesota) Fleming / Bestland | 5 | 2 |
| (North Dakota) Kawleski / Kauffman | 5 | 2 |
| (Pennsylvania) Dudt / Dudt | 3 | 4 |
| (North Dakota) McMakin / Strouse | 3 | 4 |
| (Wisconsin) Wendling / Paral | 3 | 4 |
| (North Dakota) Kraft / Kraft | 1 | 6 |
| (Ohio) Scebbi / Scebbi | 1 | 6 |

| Pool B | W | L |
|---|---|---|
| (Colorado) Moores / Wheeler | 6 | 1 |
| (Michigan) Senneker / Visnich | 5 | 2 |
| (North Dakota) Podoll / Parry | 3 | 4 |
| (Illinois) Hagenbuch / Laufer | 3 | 4 |
| (Colorado) Weldon / Franey | 3 | 4 |
| (California) Coleman / Robertson | 3 | 4 |
| (North Dakota) Holt / Brenden | 3 | 4 |
| (Minnesota) Ostrowski / Nickel | 2 | 5 |

== Round robin results ==
All draws are listed in Eastern Standard Time (UTC−05:00).

=== Draw 1 ===
Tuesday, January 20, 7:30 pm

| Sheet 2 | 1 | 2 | 3 | 4 | 5 | 6 | 7 | 8 | Final |
| (Pennsylvania) Dudt / Dudt | 0 | 1 | 0 | 1 | 0 | 0 | 0 | X | 2 |
| (Minnesota) Fenson / Stopera 🔨 | 1 | 0 | 1 | 0 | 2 | 3 | 1 | X | 8 |

| Sheet 3 | 1 | 2 | 3 | 4 | 5 | 6 | 7 | 8 | Final |
| (North Dakota) Kawleski / Kauffman 🔨 | 5 | 0 | 1 | 1 | 0 | 1 | 0 | X | 8 |
| (North Dakota) Kraft / Kraft | 0 | 1 | 0 | 0 | 1 | 0 | 1 | X | 3 |

| Sheet 4 | 1 | 2 | 3 | 4 | 5 | 6 | 7 | 8 | Final |
| (Minnesota) Fleming / Bestland | 0 | 0 | 3 | 1 | 1 | 3 | 2 | X | 10 |
| (Ohio) Scebbi / Scebbi 🔨 | 6 | 1 | 0 | 0 | 0 | 0 | 0 | X | 7 |

| Sheet 5 | 1 | 2 | 3 | 4 | 5 | 6 | 7 | 8 | Final |
| (Wisconsin) Wendling / Paral | 0 | 1 | 0 | 3 | 0 | 0 | X | X | 4 |
| (North Dakota) McMakin / Strouse 🔨 | 2 | 0 | 6 | 0 | 1 | 1 | X | X | 10 |

=== Draw 2 ===
Wednesday, January 21, 9:00 am

| Sheet 2 | 1 | 2 | 3 | 4 | 5 | 6 | 7 | 8 | Final |
| (Michigan) Senneker / Visnich | 1 | 0 | 6 | 0 | 2 | 2 | X | X | 11 |
| (Colorado) Moores / Wheeler 🔨 | 0 | 1 | 0 | 2 | 0 | 0 | X | X | 3 |

| Sheet 3 | 1 | 2 | 3 | 4 | 5 | 6 | 7 | 8 | Final |
| (North Dakota) Podoll / Parry | 3 | 0 | 0 | 0 | 0 | 0 | 4 | 0 | 7 |
| (North Dakota) Holt / Brenden 🔨 | 0 | 3 | 1 | 2 | 2 | 1 | 0 | 1 | 10 |

| Sheet 4 | 1 | 2 | 3 | 4 | 5 | 6 | 7 | 8 | Final |
| (Illinois) Hagenbuch / Laufer 🔨 | 1 | 2 | 0 | 0 | 0 | 3 | 0 | 0 | 6 |
| (Minnesota) Ostrowski / Nickel | 0 | 0 | 1 | 2 | 1 | 0 | 2 | 1 | 7 |

| Sheet 5 | 1 | 2 | 3 | 4 | 5 | 6 | 7 | 8 | Final |
| (California) Coleman / Robertson 🔨 | 0 | 0 | 1 | 1 | 1 | 0 | 0 | X | 3 |
| (Colorado) Weldon / Franey | 4 | 1 | 0 | 0 | 0 | 4 | 1 | X | 10 |

=== Draw 3 ===
Wednesday, January 21, 12:30 pm

| Sheet 2 | 1 | 2 | 3 | 4 | 5 | 6 | 7 | 8 | Final |
| (North Dakota) Kraft / Kraft | 0 | 0 | 1 | 0 | 3 | 0 | 3 | 0 | 7 |
| (Minnesota) Fleming / Bestland 🔨 | 2 | 2 | 0 | 2 | 0 | 1 | 0 | 2 | 9 |

| Sheet 3 | 1 | 2 | 3 | 4 | 5 | 6 | 7 | 8 | Final |
| (Pennsylvania) Dudt / Dudt | 0 | 2 | 2 | 1 | 0 | 0 | 1 | 1 | 7 |
| (North Dakota) McMakin / Strouse 🔨 | 1 | 0 | 0 | 0 | 1 | 1 | 0 | 0 | 3 |

| Sheet 4 | 1 | 2 | 3 | 4 | 5 | 6 | 7 | 8 | Final |
| (Minnesota) Fenson / Stopera 🔨 | 1 | 0 | 3 | 2 | 0 | 1 | 0 | X | 7 |
| (Wisconsin) Wendling / Paral | 0 | 2 | 0 | 0 | 1 | 0 | 2 | X | 5 |

| Sheet 5 | 1 | 2 | 3 | 4 | 5 | 6 | 7 | 8 | 9 | Final |
| (North Dakota) Kawleski / Kauffman | 0 | 0 | 1 | 1 | 1 | 2 | 0 | 1 | 1 | 7 |
| (Ohio) Scebbi / Scebbi 🔨 | 2 | 3 | 0 | 0 | 0 | 0 | 1 | 0 | 0 | 6 |

=== Draw 4 ===
Wednesday, January 21, 4:00 pm

| Sheet 2 | 1 | 2 | 3 | 4 | 5 | 6 | 7 | 8 | Final |
| (North Dakota) Holt / Brenden | 0 | 1 | 0 | 1 | 1 | 0 | 1 | 0 | 4 |
| (Illinois) Hagenbuch / Laufer 🔨 | 3 | 0 | 3 | 0 | 0 | 1 | 0 | 1 | 8 |

| Sheet 3 | 1 | 2 | 3 | 4 | 5 | 6 | 7 | 8 | Final |
| (Michigan) Senneker / Visnich 🔨 | 1 | 1 | 0 | 1 | 1 | 0 | 3 | X | 7 |
| (Colorado) Weldon / Franey | 0 | 0 | 1 | 0 | 0 | 2 | 0 | X | 3 |

| Sheet 4 | 1 | 2 | 3 | 4 | 5 | 6 | 7 | 8 | Final |
| (Colorado) Moores / Wheeler 🔨 | 0 | 1 | 0 | 4 | 1 | 0 | 1 | 0 | 7 |
| (California) Coleman / Robertson | 1 | 0 | 1 | 0 | 0 | 2 | 0 | 1 | 5 |

| Sheet 5 | 1 | 2 | 3 | 4 | 5 | 6 | 7 | 8 | Final |
| (North Dakota) Podoll / Parry | 0 | 0 | 0 | 1 | 0 | 1 | 2 | 0 | 4 |
| (Minnesota) Ostrowski / Nickel 🔨 | 1 | 1 | 1 | 0 | 1 | 0 | 0 | 1 | 5 |

=== Draw 5 ===
Wednesday, January 21, 7:30 pm

| Sheet 2 | 1 | 2 | 3 | 4 | 5 | 6 | 7 | 8 | Final |
| (Ohio) Scebbi / Scebbi | 0 | 0 | 1 | 2 | 0 | 0 | 0 | X | 3 |
| (Pennsylvania) Dudt / Dudt 🔨 | 1 | 1 | 0 | 0 | 3 | 2 | 2 | X | 9 |

| Sheet 3 | 1 | 2 | 3 | 4 | 5 | 6 | 7 | 8 | Final |
| (Wisconsin) Wendling / Paral | 1 | 0 | 0 | 0 | 0 | 0 | X | X | 1 |
| (North Dakota) Kawleski / Kauffman 🔨 | 0 | 2 | 2 | 1 | 2 | 1 | X | X | 8 |

| Sheet 4 | 1 | 2 | 3 | 4 | 5 | 6 | 7 | 8 | Final |
| (North Dakota) McMakin / Strouse 🔨 | 0 | 2 | 1 | 1 | 1 | 2 | X | X | 7 |
| (North Dakota) Kraft / Kraft | 1 | 0 | 0 | 0 | 0 | 0 | X | X | 1 |

| Sheet 5 | 1 | 2 | 3 | 4 | 5 | 6 | 7 | 8 | Final |
| (Minnesota) Fleming / Bestland | 0 | 0 | 1 | 0 | 0 | 0 | X | X | 1 |
| (Minnesota) Fenson / Stopera 🔨 | 2 | 1 | 0 | 1 | 3 | 1 | X | X | 8 |

=== Draw 6 ===
Thursday, January 22, 9:00 am

| Sheet 2 | 1 | 2 | 3 | 4 | 5 | 6 | 7 | 8 | Final |
| (Minnesota) Ostrowski / Nickel | 0 | 2 | 0 | 1 | 0 | 3 | 0 | 1 | 7 |
| (Michigan) Senneker / Visnich 🔨 | 1 | 0 | 3 | 0 | 1 | 0 | 3 | 0 | 8 |

| Sheet 3 | 1 | 2 | 3 | 4 | 5 | 6 | 7 | 8 | Final |
| (California) Coleman / Robertson 🔨 | 0 | 1 | 1 | 0 | 0 | 3 | 0 | 0 | 5 |
| (North Dakota) Podoll / Parry | 3 | 0 | 0 | 1 | 1 | 0 | 3 | 1 | 9 |

| Sheet 4 | 1 | 2 | 3 | 4 | 5 | 6 | 7 | 8 | Final |
| (Colorado) Weldon / Franey 🔨 | 1 | 1 | 2 | 1 | 0 | 1 | 0 | 1 | 7 |
| (North Dakota) Holt / Brenden | 0 | 0 | 0 | 0 | 2 | 0 | 2 | 0 | 4 |

| Sheet 5 | 1 | 2 | 3 | 4 | 5 | 6 | 7 | 8 | Final |
| (Illinois) Hagenbuch / Laufer 🔨 | 0 | 0 | 1 | 1 | 2 | 1 | 0 | 0 | 5 |
| (Colorado) Moores / Wheeler | 2 | 1 | 0 | 0 | 0 | 0 | 3 | 1 | 7 |

=== Draw 7 ===
Thursday, January 22, 2:00 pm

| Sheet 2 | 1 | 2 | 3 | 4 | 5 | 6 | 7 | 8 | Final |
| (North Dakota) Kawleski / Kauffman | 0 | 0 | 3 | 2 | 0 | 2 | 0 | 1 | 8 |
| (North Dakota) McMakin / Strouse 🔨 | 3 | 1 | 0 | 0 | 2 | 0 | 1 | 0 | 7 |

| Sheet 3 | 1 | 2 | 3 | 4 | 5 | 6 | 7 | 8 | Final |
| (Minnesota) Fenson / Stopera 🔨 | 5 | 2 | 1 | 2 | X | X | X | X | 10 |
| (Ohio) Scebbi / Scebbi | 0 | 0 | 0 | 0 | X | X | X | X | 0 |

| Sheet 4 | 1 | 2 | 3 | 4 | 5 | 6 | 7 | 8 | 9 | Final |
| (Pennsylvania) Dudt / Dudt 🔨 | 0 | 3 | 1 | 0 | 1 | 0 | 0 | 3 | 0 | 8 |
| (Minnesota) Fleming / Bestland | 1 | 0 | 0 | 4 | 0 | 2 | 1 | 0 | 1 | 9 |

| Sheet 5 | 1 | 2 | 3 | 4 | 5 | 6 | 7 | 8 | Final |
| (North Dakota) Kraft / Kraft 🔨 | 1 | 0 | 0 | 1 | 0 | 1 | 0 | X | 3 |
| (Wisconsin) Wendling / Paral | 0 | 2 | 1 | 0 | 2 | 0 | 1 | X | 6 |

=== Draw 8 ===
Thursday, January 22, 7:00 pm

| Sheet 2 | 1 | 2 | 3 | 4 | 5 | 6 | 7 | 8 | Final |
| (North Dakota) Podoll / Parry | 0 | 1 | 0 | 1 | 0 | 1 | 1 | 2 | 6 |
| (Colorado) Weldon / Franey 🔨 | 1 | 0 | 1 | 0 | 1 | 0 | 0 | 0 | 3 |

| Sheet 3 | 1 | 2 | 3 | 4 | 5 | 6 | 7 | 8 | Final |
| (Colorado) Moores / Wheeler 🔨 | 1 | 0 | 1 | 0 | 3 | 0 | 2 | 1 | 8 |
| (Minnesota) Ostrowski / Nickel | 0 | 1 | 0 | 1 | 0 | 4 | 0 | 0 | 6 |

| Sheet 4 | 1 | 2 | 3 | 4 | 5 | 6 | 7 | 8 | Final |
| (Michigan) Senneker / Visnich | 0 | 3 | 0 | 1 | 0 | 0 | 1 | X | 5 |
| (Illinois) Hagenbuch / Laufer 🔨 | 1 | 0 | 3 | 0 | 2 | 2 | 0 | X | 8 |

| Sheet 5 | 1 | 2 | 3 | 4 | 5 | 6 | 7 | 8 | Final |
| (North Dakota) Holt / Brenden | 1 | 0 | 1 | 1 | 0 | 5 | 0 | 0 | 8 |
| (California) Coleman / Robertson 🔨 | 0 | 4 | 0 | 0 | 2 | 0 | 2 | 3 | 11 |

=== Draw 9 ===
Friday, January 23, 9:00 am

| Sheet 2 | 1 | 2 | 3 | 4 | 5 | 6 | 7 | 8 | Final |
| (Minnesota) Fenson / Stopera 🔨 | 1 | 0 | 2 | 1 | 1 | 1 | 1 | X | 7 |
| (North Dakota) Kraft / Kraft | 0 | 1 | 0 | 0 | 0 | 0 | 0 | X | 1 |

| Sheet 3 | 1 | 2 | 3 | 4 | 5 | 6 | 7 | 8 | Final |
| (Minnesota) Fleming / Bestland 🔨 | 1 | 0 | 2 | 0 | 2 | 0 | 3 | X | 8 |
| (Wisconsin) Wendling / Paral | 0 | 2 | 0 | 3 | 0 | 1 | 0 | X | 6 |

| Sheet 4 | 1 | 2 | 3 | 4 | 5 | 6 | 7 | 8 | Final |
| (Ohio) Scebbi / Scebbi 🔨 | 6 | 1 | 2 | 0 | 0 | 1 | 0 | X | 10 |
| (North Dakota) McMakin / Strouse | 0 | 0 | 0 | 2 | 1 | 0 | 4 | X | 7 |

| Sheet 5 | 1 | 2 | 3 | 4 | 5 | 6 | 7 | 8 | Final |
| (Pennsylvania) Dudt / Dudt | 0 | 2 | 0 | 0 | 1 | 0 | 1 | X | 4 |
| (North Dakota) Kawleski / Kauffman 🔨 | 1 | 0 | 2 | 2 | 0 | 3 | 0 | X | 8 |

=== Draw 10 ===
Friday, January 23, 12:30 pm

| Sheet 2 | 1 | 2 | 3 | 4 | 5 | 6 | 7 | 8 | Final |
| (Colorado) Moores / Wheeler | 0 | 1 | 1 | 2 | 0 | 1 | 0 | 2 | 7 |
| (North Dakota) Holt / Brenden 🔨 | 2 | 0 | 0 | 0 | 1 | 0 | 1 | 0 | 4 |

| Sheet 3 | 1 | 2 | 3 | 4 | 5 | 6 | 7 | 8 | Final |
| (Illinois) Hagenbuch / Laufer | 0 | 2 | 0 | 0 | 1 | 1 | 0 | 0 | 4 |
| (California) Coleman / Robertson 🔨 | 1 | 0 | 2 | 2 | 0 | 0 | 1 | 2 | 8 |

| Sheet 4 | 1 | 2 | 3 | 4 | 5 | 6 | 7 | 8 | Final |
| (Minnesota) Ostrowski / Nickel | 1 | 0 | 0 | 3 | 1 | 0 | 0 | X | 5 |
| (Colorado) Weldon / Franey 🔨 | 0 | 5 | 2 | 0 | 0 | 2 | 2 | X | 11 |

| Sheet 5 | 1 | 2 | 3 | 4 | 5 | 6 | 7 | 8 | Final |
| (Michigan) Senneker / Visnich 🔨 | 1 | 3 | 1 | 0 | 2 | 1 | 0 | X | 8 |
| (North Dakota) Podoll / Parry | 0 | 0 | 0 | 2 | 0 | 0 | 3 | X | 5 |

=== Draw 11 ===
Friday, January 23, 4:00 pm

| Sheet 2 | 1 | 2 | 3 | 4 | 5 | 6 | 7 | 8 | Final |
| (Wisconsin) Wendling / Paral | 0 | 0 | 1 | 1 | 2 | 0 | 2 | 0 | 6 |
| (Ohio) Scebbi / Scebbi 🔨 | 2 | 1 | 0 | 0 | 0 | 1 | 0 | 1 | 5 |

| Sheet 3 | 1 | 2 | 3 | 4 | 5 | 6 | 7 | 8 | Final |
| (North Dakota) Kraft / Kraft 🔨 | 0 | 0 | 0 | 0 | 0 | X | X | X | 0 |
| (Pennsylvania) Dudt / Dudt | 2 | 2 | 1 | 1 | 1 | X | X | X | 7 |

| Sheet 4 | 1 | 2 | 3 | 4 | 5 | 6 | 7 | 8 | Final |
| (North Dakota) Kawleski / Kauffman | 0 | 0 | 0 | 0 | X | X | X | X | 0 |
| (Minnesota) Fenson / Stopera 🔨 | 3 | 2 | 1 | 1 | X | X | X | X | 7 |

| Sheet 5 | 1 | 2 | 3 | 4 | 5 | 6 | 7 | 8 | Final |
| (North Dakota) McMakin / Strouse 🔨 | 4 | 0 | 2 | 0 | 1 | 0 | X | X | 7 |
| (Minnesota) Fleming / Bestland | 0 | 1 | 0 | 1 | 0 | 1 | X | X | 3 |

=== Draw 12 ===
Friday, January 23, 7:30 pm

| Sheet 2 | 1 | 2 | 3 | 4 | 5 | 6 | 7 | 8 | Final |
| (California) Coleman / Robertson 🔨 | 1 | 0 | 1 | 0 | 1 | 1 | 0 | 1 | 5 |
| (Minnesota) Ostrowski / Nickel | 0 | 1 | 0 | 0 | 0 | 0 | 2 | 0 | 3 |

| Sheet 3 | 1 | 2 | 3 | 4 | 5 | 6 | 7 | 8 | Final |
| (North Dakota) Holt / Brenden 🔨 | 3 | 0 | 2 | 0 | 2 | 0 | 0 | X | 7 |
| (Michigan) Senneker / Visnich | 0 | 1 | 0 | 1 | 0 | 1 | 1 | X | 4 |

| Sheet 4 | 1 | 2 | 3 | 4 | 5 | 6 | 7 | 8 | Final |
| (North Dakota) Podoll / Parry | 1 | 0 | 1 | 0 | 1 | 0 | 0 | 1 | 4 |
| (Colorado) Moores / Wheeler 🔨 | 0 | 2 | 0 | 1 | 0 | 1 | 1 | 0 | 5 |

| Sheet 5 | 1 | 2 | 3 | 4 | 5 | 6 | 7 | 8 | Final |
| (Colorado) Weldon / Franey | 0 | 2 | 1 | 0 | 0 | 1 | 0 | 0 | 4 |
| (Illinois) Hagenbuch / Laufer 🔨 | 1 | 0 | 0 | 1 | 2 | 0 | 1 | 1 | 6 |

=== Draw 13 ===
Saturday, January 24, 9:00 am

| Sheet 2 | 1 | 2 | 3 | 4 | 5 | 6 | 7 | 8 | Final |
| (Minnesota) Fleming / Bestland 🔨 | 3 | 0 | 0 | 2 | 0 | 3 | 2 | X | 10 |
| (North Dakota) Kawleski / Kauffman | 0 | 1 | 1 | 0 | 1 | 0 | 0 | X | 3 |

| Sheet 3 | 1 | 2 | 3 | 4 | 5 | 6 | 7 | 8 | Final |
| (North Dakota) McMakin / Strouse | 0 | 0 | 0 | 2 | 0 | 0 | 0 | X | 2 |
| (Minnesota) Fenson / Stopera 🔨 | 1 | 1 | 2 | 0 | 1 | 1 | 1 | X | 7 |

| Sheet 4 | 1 | 2 | 3 | 4 | 5 | 6 | 7 | 8 | Final |
| (Wisconsin) Wendling / Paral 🔨 | 1 | 0 | 4 | 0 | 1 | 1 | 0 | 1 | 8 |
| (Pennsylvania) Dudt / Dudt | 0 | 2 | 0 | 2 | 0 | 0 | 3 | 0 | 7 |

| Sheet 5 | 1 | 2 | 3 | 4 | 5 | 6 | 7 | 8 | Final |
| (Ohio) Scebbi / Scebbi | 0 | 1 | 0 | 1 | 3 | 0 | 2 | 0 | 7 |
| (North Dakota) Kraft / Kraft 🔨 | 3 | 0 | 1 | 0 | 0 | 2 | 0 | 3 | 9 |

=== Draw 14 ===
Saturday, January 24, 12:00 pm

| Sheet 2 | 1 | 2 | 3 | 4 | 5 | 6 | 7 | 8 | Final |
| (Illinois) Hagenbuch / Laufer 🔨 | 0 | 1 | 0 | 0 | 1 | 0 | 0 | X | 2 |
| (North Dakota) Podoll / Parry | 1 | 0 | 1 | 1 | 0 | 2 | 0 | X | 5 |

| Sheet 3 | 1 | 2 | 3 | 4 | 5 | 6 | 7 | 8 | Final |
| (Colorado) Weldon / Franey 🔨 | 3 | 2 | 0 | 1 | 0 | 0 | 0 | X | 6 |
| (Colorado) Moores / Wheeler | 0 | 0 | 2 | 0 | 2 | 2 | 3 | X | 9 |

| Sheet 4 | 1 | 2 | 3 | 4 | 5 | 6 | 7 | 8 | Final |
| (California) Coleman / Robertson | 0 | 0 | 2 | 1 | 0 | 2 | 0 | 0 | 5 |
| (Michigan) Senneker / Visnich 🔨 | 1 | 1 | 0 | 0 | 3 | 0 | 2 | 1 | 8 |

| Sheet 5 | 1 | 2 | 3 | 4 | 5 | 6 | 7 | 8 | Final |
| (Minnesota) Ostrowski / Nickel | 0 | 0 | 0 | 0 | 1 | 0 | X | X | 1 |
| (North Dakota) Holt / Brenden 🔨 | 2 | 0 | 2 | 3 | 0 | 4 | X | X | 11 |

== Tiebreaker ==
Saturday, January 24, 3:00 pm

| Sheet 5 | 1 | 2 | 3 | 4 | 5 | 6 | 7 | 8 | Final |
| (North Dakota) Podoll / Parry 🔨 | 0 | 0 | 1 | 0 | 2 | 0 | 1 | X | 4 |
| (Illinois) Hagenbuch / Laufer | 1 | 1 | 0 | 4 | 0 | 1 | 0 | X | 7 |

== Playoffs ==
Quarterfinals
B2 | (Michigan) Senneker / Visnich | 4
A3 | (North Dakota) Kawleski / Kauffman | 6
A2 | (Minnesota) Fleming / Bestland | 9
B3 | (Illinois) Hagenbuch / Laufer | 1

Semifinals
A1 | (Minnesota) Fenson / Stopera | 4
A3 | (North Dakota) Kawleski / Kauffman | 6
B1 | (Colorado) Moores / Wheeler | 5
A2 | (Minnesota) Fleming / Bestland | 6

Final
A3 | (North Dakota) Kawleski / Kauffman | 8
A2 | (Minnesota) Fleming / Bestland | 4

=== Quarterfinals ===
Saturday, January 24, 7:30 pm

| Sheet 3 | 1 | 2 | 3 | 4 | 5 | 6 | 7 | 8 | Final |
| (Michigan) Senneker / Visnich 🔨 | 0 | 0 | 0 | 0 | 2 | 1 | 0 | 1 | 4 |
| (North Dakota) Kawleski / Kauffman | 1 | 1 | 1 | 2 | 0 | 0 | 1 | 0 | 6 |

| Sheet 4 | 1 | 2 | 3 | 4 | 5 | 6 | 7 | 8 | Final |
| (Minnesota) Fleming / Bestland 🔨 | 1 | 0 | 3 | 1 | 2 | 2 | X | X | 9 |
| (Illinois) Hagenbuch / Laufer | 0 | 1 | 0 | 0 | 0 | 0 | X | X | 1 |

=== Semifinals ===
Sunday, January 25, 9:00 am

| Sheet 2 | 1 | 2 | 3 | 4 | 5 | 6 | 7 | 8 | Final |
| (Colorado) Moores / Wheeler 🔨 | 0 | 0 | 0 | 1 | 1 | 0 | 1 | 2 | 5 |
| (Minnesota) Fleming / Bestland | 1 | 1 | 1 | 0 | 0 | 3 | 0 | 0 | 6 |

| Sheet 5 | 1 | 2 | 3 | 4 | 5 | 6 | 7 | 8 | Final |
| (Minnesota) Fenson / Stopera 🔨 | 1 | 1 | 0 | 2 | 0 | 0 | 0 | 0 | 4 |
| (North Dakota) Kawleski / Kauffman | 0 | 0 | 1 | 0 | 2 | 1 | 1 | 1 | 6 |

=== Final ===
Sunday, January 25, 1:00 pm

| Sheet 3 | 1 | 2 | 3 | 4 | 5 | 6 | 7 | 8 | Final |
| (North Dakota) Kawleski / Kauffman | 0 | 3 | 0 | 0 | 1 | 1 | 2 | 1 | 8 |
| (Minnesota) Fleming / Bestland 🔨 | 2 | 0 | 1 | 1 | 0 | 0 | 0 | 0 | 4 |
