= 2010 United States Mixed Doubles Curling Championship =

- Host city: Seattle, Washington
- Arena: Granite Curling Club
- Dates: December 3–6, 2009
- Winner: Sharon Vukich and Mike Calcagno

The 2010 United States Mixed Doubles Curling Championship was held from December 3–6, 2009 at the Granite Curling Club in Seattle, Washington. Sharon Vukich and Mike Calcagno won the tournament, earning the right to represent the United States at the 2010 World Mixed Doubles Curling Championship in Chelyabinsk, Russia.

== Teams ==
Nineteen teams qualified to compete in the championship.

Female	Male	State(s)
Cristin Clark	Sean Beighton	Washington
Gabrielle Coleman	Barry Ivy	California
Leslie Frosch	David Cornfield	Washington
Connie Kupferschmidt	Timothy Doherty	Minnesota
Janice Langanke	Dean Gemmell	New Jersey
Emily Good	Jake Vukich	Washington
Katie Kauffman	Arnie Iwanick	Washington
Emily Juocys	Ben Levy	Michigan
Senja Lopac	Matt Zyblut	Minnesota, Virginia
Elizabeth Coffin	Steve Lundeen	Washington
Michelle Summer	Gary Mazzotta	Minnesota
Lysa Hambley	Derrick McLean	Washington
Joyance Meechai	Jason Nawyn	New York, Massachusetts
Jaynie Pleasants	James Pleasants	Washington
Abigail Read	Bart Read	Maine
Julie Smith	Eric Schultz	Minnesota
Charrissa Lin	Derek Surka	Connecticut
Cynthia Kozai	Barry VanWieringen	Washington
Sharon Vukich	Mike Calcagno	Washington

== Round robin ==
The 19 teams were split into three pools; each pool played a round robin and at the end the top two teams advanced to the playoffs. The standings at the end of the round robin phase were:

Key
Teams to playoffs

Pool A	W	L
Hambley / McLean	6	0
Clark / Beighton	5	1
Good / Vukich	4	2
Kozai / VanWieringen	2	4
Read / Read	2	4
Summer / Mazzotta	1	5
Juocys / Levy	1	5

Pool B	W	L
Lin / Surka	5	0
Langanke / Gemmell	4	1
Coleman / Ivy	2	3
Frosch / Cornfield	2	3
Kauffman / Iwanick	1	4
Kupferschmidt / Doherty	1	4

Pool C	W	L
Vukich / Calcagno	5	0
Meechai / Nawyn	3	2
Coffin / Lundeen	2	3
Lopac / Zyblut	2	3
Smith / Schultz	2	3
Pleasants / Pleasants	1	4

== Playoffs ==
The playoffs consisted of a 6-team bracket with the top two teams receiving byes in the quarterfinals.

=== Bracket ===
Quarterfinals
Meechai/Nawyn	1
Clark/Beighton	9
Gemmell/Langanke	4
Vukich/Calcagno	7

Semifinals
Lin/Surka	7
Clark/Beighton	8
Hambley/McLean	6
Vukich/Calcagno	7

Final
Clark/Beighton	4
Vukich/Calcagno	10

=== Quarterfinals ===
Saturday, December 5, 8:00pm PT

Team	1	2	3	4	5	6	7	8	Final
Meechai/Nawyn	0	0	0	0	1	0	0	X	1
Clark/Beighton	1	3	2	1	0	1	1	X	9

Team	1	2	3	4	5	6	7	8	Final
Gemmell/Langanke	2	0	1	0	0	2	0	0	4
Vukich/Calcagno	0	1	0	2	1	0	1	2	7

=== Semifinals ===
Sunday, December 6, 9:00am PT

Team	1	2	3	4	5	6	7	8	Final
Lin/Surka	0	0	3	1	0	2	1	0	7
Clark/Beighton	1	2	0	3	0	1	0	1	8

Team	1	2	3	4	5	6	7	8	Final
Hambley/McLean	1	1	0	1	0	2	1	0	6
Vukich/Calcagno	0	0	2	0	4	0	0	1	7

=== Final ===
Sunday, December 6, 12:00pm ET

Team	1	2	3	4	5	6	7	8	Final
Clark/Beighton	0	0	2	0	0	1	1	0	6
Vukich/Calcagno	2	1	0	4	1	0	0	2	10
