= IceWorks Skating Complex =

Ice arena in Aston, Pennsylvania

Coordinates: 39.8587°N 75.4239°W

- IceWorks
- Interactive map of IceWorks Skating Complex
- Location: Aston, Pennsylvania
- Surface: Ice

Construction
- Opened: 1997

Tenants
- Neumann University Men's and Women's Ice Hockey; Philadelphia Little Flyers (EHL) (2003–present); Aston Rebels (NAHL) (2015–2017); Philadelphia Fearless Flyers; Flyers Warriors; Delco Phantoms

IceWorks is an ice arena that is located in Aston, Pennsylvania USA, fifteen minutes southwest of downtown Philadelphia, Pennsylvania and ten minutes northeast of Wilmington, Delaware. It opened in October 1997.

== History and architectural features ==
IceWorks has four ice surfaces, a full-service restaurant and other amenities. It is one of the few public rinks in the United States or Canada with a professional coaching staff. Jim Watson, a former Philadelphia Flyers player, leads the hockey staff along with the rink's general manager, Stephane Charbonneau. Uschi Keszler, the coach of Olympic skater Elvis Stojko, leads a figure skating staff of eighteen full-time coaches. Public skating is also offered for people of all ages.

It is also a training center for national, international, world and Olympic coaches and competitors, and is the host facility for the Liberty Open Summer Competition, the largest non-qualifying figure skating competition in the world, which draws many national and international competitors. The IceWorks Skating Club has hosted many U.S. regional and sectional championships.

Olympic athletes Tanith Belbin and Ben Agosto (USA), and Oksana Domnina and Maxim Shabalin (Russia) trained at the facility in preparation for the 2010 Winter Olympics in Vancouver, British Columbia, Canada. Belbin and Agosto were the first skaters representing the IceWorks Skating Club to win a world medal.

The rink hosts Neumann University's men's and women's ice hockey home games and is the home of the Philadelphia Little Flyers junior ice hockey team. The arena also hosts many junior hockey tournaments and international figure skating competitions. Celebrity Boxing has also held events at IceWorks, including appearances by former Major League Baseball player Jose Canseco.

The facility's main competitors are Ice Line in West Chester, The Pond in Newark, Delaware, and the Oaks Center Ice in Phoenixville.

IceWorks is also home to two Special Hockey International teams, the Philadelphia Fearless Flyers and the Bucks County Admirals. The Bucks County Admirals use IceWorks as their second home arena; their first home arena is the Bucks County Ice Sports Center.

On January 24, 2009, IceWorks was the host of a celebrity boxing match between Danny Bonaduce and José Canseco that ended in a majority draw.

IceWorks was the host site for the 2012 United States Men's Curling Championship and the 2012 United States Women's Curling Championship.
