= FSCC Early Cash =

The FSCC Early Cash was a bonspiel, or curling tournament, that took place at the Four Seasons Curling Club in Blaine, Minnesota. The tournament was held in a round robin format. The tournament started in 2013 as part of the World Curling Tour and the Great Lakes Curling Tour. In 2014, the September WCT event in Blaine, Minnesota was called the Twin Cities Open and was open to both genders. The event was discontinued after that.

== Past champions ==
Only skip's name is displayed.

=== Men ===
Year	Winning team	Runner up team	Purse (USD)
2013 FSCC Early Cash	(Wisconsin) Craig Brown	(Massachusetts) Korey Dropkin	$10,000
2014 Twin Cities Open	(Minnesota) Korey Dropkin	(Minnesota) Nina Spatola	$10,000

=== Women ===
Year	Winning team	Runner up team	Purse (USD)
2013 FSCC Early Cash	(Minnesota) Cory Christensen	(Minnesota) Cassie Potter	$7,000
