= 2009 United States Mixed Doubles Curling Championship =

- Host city: Two Harbors, Minnesota
- Arena: Two Harbors Curling Club
- Dates: December 4-7, 2008
- Winner: Cristin Clark and Brady Clark

The 2009 United States Mixed Doubles Curling Championship was held from December 4-7, 2008 at the Two Harbors Curling Club in Two Harbors, Minnesota. Husband and wife Brady Clark and Cristin Clark won the tournament, earning the right to represent the United States at the 2009 World Mixed Doubles Curling Championship in Cortina d'Ampezzo, Italy.

== Teams ==
Sixteen teams competed in the championship.

| Female | Male | State(s) |
|---|---|---|
| Jamie Haskell | Nate Haskell | Minnesota |
| Jaclyn Lemke | Ryan Lemke | Wisconsin |
| Laura Roessler | Nathan Gebert | Wisconsin |
| Madonna Fitzgerald | Steve Pickle | North Dakota |
| Gabrielle Coleman | David Cornfield | California, Washington |
| Rachel Ryan | Alex Ryan | New York |
| Abigail Read | Bart Read | Maine |
| Senja Lopac | John Hoffoss | Minnesota |
| Cassie Potter | Corrie Potter | Minnesota |
| Cristin Clark | Brady Clark | Washington |
| Carmen Delaney | Scott Abrahamson | North Dakota, Minnesota |
| Miyo Konno | Steve Lundeen | Washington |
| Melissa Gilbertson | Justin Haworth | Wisconsin |
| Margie Nelson | Tom Hemenway | Minnesota, Arizona |
| Katharine Gibeau | Gary Gibeau | Minnesota |
| Michelle Summer | Gary Mazzotta | Minnesota |

== Round robin ==
=== Standings ===
The 16 teams were split into two pools; each pool played a round robin and at the end the top two teams advanced to the playoffs. The standings at the end of the round robin phase were:

Key
| Teams to playoffs |

| Pool A | W | L |
|---|---|---|
| Lemke / Lemke | 6 | 1 |
| Haskell / Haskell | 6 | 1 |
| Roessler / Gebert | 5 | 2 |
| Lopac / Hoffoss | 3 | 4 |
| Ryan / Ryan | 3 | 4 |
| Fitzgerald / Pickle | 3 | 4 |
| Coleman / Cornfield | 2 | 5 |
| Read / Read | 0 | 7 |

| Pool B | W | L |
|---|---|---|
| Kono / Lundeen | 6 | 1 |
| Clark / Clark | 6 | 1 |
| Potter / Potter | 5 | 2 |
| Gilbertson / Haworth | 4 | 3 |
| Summer / Mazzotta | 3 | 4 |
| Delaney / Abrahamson | 2 | 5 |
| Gibeau / Gibeau | 2 | 5 |
| Nelson / Hemenway | 0 | 7 |

=== Game results ===
Game scores from the round robin phase:

==== Draw 1 ====
Thursday, December 4, 11:00am CT

| Sheet 1 | 1 | 2 | 3 | 4 | 5 | 6 | 7 | 8 | Final |
| Fitzgerald/Pickle 🔨 | 4 | 1 | 0 | 2 | 1 | 0 | 0 | 1 | 9 |
| Coleman/Cornfield | 0 | 0 | 3 | 0 | 0 | 4 | 1 | 0 | 8 |

| Sheet 2 | 1 | 2 | 3 | 4 | 5 | 6 | 7 | 8 | Final |
| Lopac/Hoffoss 🔨 | 2 | 0 | 2 | 0 | 0 | 0 | 1 | 0 | 5 |
| Haskell/Haskell | 0 | 3 | 0 | 4 | 1 | 3 | 0 | 2 | 13 |

| Sheet 3 | 1 | 2 | 3 | 4 | 5 | 6 | 7 | 8 | Final |
| Roessler/Gebert 🔨 | 3 | 1 | 0 | 2 | 0 | 1 | 0 | 1 | 8 |
| Read/Read | 0 | 0 | 1 | 0 | 2 | 0 | 2 | 0 | 5 |

| Sheet 4 | 1 | 2 | 3 | 4 | 5 | 6 | 7 | 8 | Final |
| Ryan/Ryan 🔨 | 0 | 0 | 0 | 0 | 2 | 0 | 0 | 1 | 3 |
| Lemke/Lemke | 1 | 1 | 1 | 1 | 0 | 1 | 1 | 0 | 6 |

==== Draw 2 ====
Thursday, December 4, 2:00pm CT

| Sheet 1 | 1 | 2 | 3 | 4 | 5 | 6 | 7 | 8 | Final |
| Gilbertson/Haworth 🔨 | 3 | 0 | 0 | 0 | 1 | 0 | 2 | 0 | 6 |
| Konno/Lundeen | 0 | 4 | 1 | 1 | 0 | 2 | 0 | 3 | 11 |

| Sheet 2 | 1 | 2 | 3 | 4 | 5 | 6 | 7 | 8 | Final |
| Summer/Mazzotta 🔨 | 0 | 0 | 0 | 5 | 0 | 1 | 1 | 1 | 8 |
| Potter/Potter | 1 | 1 | 1 | 0 | 1 | 0 | 0 | 0 | 4 |

| Sheet 3 | 1 | 2 | 3 | 4 | 5 | 6 | 7 | 8 | Final |
| Delaney/Abrahamson🔨 | 0 | 0 | 1 | 0 | 0 | 2 | 0 | 3 | 6 |
| Gibeau/Gibeau | 1 | 1 | 0 | 1 | 1 | 0 | 1 | 0 | 5 |

| Sheet 4 | 1 | 2 | 3 | 4 | 5 | 6 | 7 | 8 | Final |
| Nelson/Hemenway 🔨 | 1 | 0 | 0 | 1 | 0 | 0 | 0 | X | 2 |
| Clark/Clark | 0 | 2 | 1 | 0 | 3 | 3 | 2 | X | 11 |

==== Draw 3 ====
Thursday, December 4, 5:00pm CT

| Sheet 1 | 1 | 2 | 3 | 4 | 5 | 6 | 7 | 8 | Final |
| Ryan/Ryan | 0 | 0 | 0 | 0 | 2 | 0 | 3 | X | 5 |
| Roessler/Gebert 🔨 | 1 | 2 | 1 | 2 | 0 | 1 | 0 | X | 7 |

| Sheet 2 | 1 | 2 | 3 | 4 | 5 | 6 | 7 | 8 | Final |
| Lemke/Lemke | 0 | 1 | 2 | 0 | 1 | 1 | 0 | X | 5 |
| Read/Read 🔨 | 1 | 0 | 0 | 1 | 0 | 0 | 1 | X | 3 |

| Sheet 3 | 1 | 2 | 3 | 4 | 5 | 6 | 7 | 8 | Final |
| Coleman/Cornfield 🔨 | 0 | 1 | 0 | 0 | 2 | 0 | 2 | X | 5 |
| Haskell/Haskell | 1 | 0 | 3 | 1 | 0 | 1 | 0 | X | 6 |

| Sheet 4 | 1 | 2 | 3 | 4 | 5 | 6 | 7 | 8 | Final |
| Fitzgerald/Pickle | 1 | 0 | 3 | 0 | 1 | 0 | 2 | 0 | 7 |
| Lopac/Hoffoss 🔨 | 0 | 2 | 0 | 3 | 0 | 2 | 0 | 1 | 8 |

==== Draw 4 ====
Thursday, December 4, 8:00pm CT

| Sheet 1 | 1 | 2 | 3 | 4 | 5 | 6 | 7 | 8 | Final |
| Nelson/Hemenway | 0 | 1 | 0 | 0 | 0 | 0 | 0 | X | 1 |
| Delaney/Abrahamson 🔨 | 1 | 0 | 3 | 2 | 2 | 1 | 1 | X | 10 |

| Sheet 2 | 1 | 2 | 3 | 4 | 5 | 6 | 7 | 8 | Final |
| Clark/Clark | 0 | 4 | 0 | 2 | 1 | 0 | 4 | X | 11 |
| Gibeau/Gibeau 🔨 | 1 | 0 | 2 | 0 | 0 | 1 | 0 | X | 4 |

| Sheet 3 | 1 | 2 | 3 | 4 | 5 | 6 | 7 | 8 | Final |
| Gilbertson/Haworth | 0 | 0 | 0 | 1 | 0 | 3 | 0 | X | 4 |
| Potter/Potter 🔨 | 1 | 2 | 2 | 0 | 2 | 0 | 1 | X | 8 |

| Sheet 4 | 1 | 2 | 3 | 4 | 5 | 6 | 7 | 8 | Final |
| Konno/Lundeen 🔨 | 2 | 3 | 1 | 2 | 0 | 2 | 1 | X | 11 |
| Summer/Mazzotta | 0 | 0 | 0 | 0 | 1 | 0 | 0 | X | 1 |

==== Draw 5 ====
Friday, December 5, 8:00am CT

| Sheet 1 | 1 | 2 | 3 | 4 | 5 | 6 | 7 | 8 | Final |
| Haskell/Haskell | 4 | 0 | 1 | 0 | 0 | 1 | 0 | 1 | 8 |
| Read/Read 🔨 | 0 | 3 | 0 | 1 | 2 | 0 | 1 | 0 | 7 |

| Sheet 2 | 1 | 2 | 3 | 4 | 5 | 6 | 7 | 8 | Final |
| Ryan/Ryan 🔨 | 2 | 3 | 1 | 0 | 2 | 3 | 1 | X | 12 |
| Fitzgerald/Pickle | 0 | 0 | 0 | 1 | 0 | 0 | 0 | X | 1 |

| Sheet 3 | 1 | 2 | 3 | 4 | 5 | 6 | 7 | 8 | Final |
| Lopac/Hoffoss 🔨 | 1 | 0 | 1 | 0 | 0 | 0 | X | X | 2 |
| Roessler/Gebert | 0 | 4 | 0 | 4 | 2 | 3 | X | X | 13 |

| Sheet 4 | 1 | 2 | 3 | 4 | 5 | 6 | 7 | 8 | Final |
| Lemke/Lemke 🔨 | 1 | 0 | 0 | 3 | 1 | 0 | 2 | 2 | 9 |
| Coleman/Cornfield | 0 | 4 | 1 | 0 | 0 | 1 | 0 | 0 | 6 |

==== Draw 6 ====
Friday, December 5, 11:00am CT

| Sheet 1 | 1 | 2 | 3 | 4 | 5 | 6 | 7 | 8 | Final |
| Potter/Potter | 2 | 0 | 1 | 1 | 0 | 0 | 4 | X | 8 |
| Gibeau/Gibeau 🔨 | 0 | 1 | 0 | 0 | 2 | 1 | 0 | X | 4 |

| Sheet 2 | 1 | 2 | 3 | 4 | 5 | 6 | 7 | 8 | Final |
| Nelson/Hemenway | 0 | 0 | 1 | 1 | 0 | 0 | 1 | X | 3 |
| Konno/Lundeen 🔨 | 5 | 1 | 0 | 0 | 1 | 1 | 0 | X | 8 |

| Sheet 3 | 1 | 2 | 3 | 4 | 5 | 6 | 7 | 8 | Final |
| Summer/Mazzotta 🔨 | 1 | 0 | 0 | 1 | 0 | 2 | 0 | 3 | 7 |
| Delaney/Abrahamson | 0 | 2 | 0 | 0 | 1 | 0 | 1 | 0 | 4 |

| Sheet 4 | 1 | 2 | 3 | 4 | 5 | 6 | 7 | 8 | Final |
| Clark/Clark 🔨 | 0 | 2 | 1 | 1 | 1 | 0 | 0 | 1 | 6 |
| Gilbertson/Haworth | 1 | 0 | 0 | 0 | 0 | 1 | 2 | 0 | 4 |

==== Draw 7 ====
Friday, December 5, 2:00pm CT

| Sheet 1 | 1 | 2 | 3 | 4 | 5 | 6 | 7 | 8 | Final |
| Lopac/Hoffoss 🔨 | 4 | 0 | 1 | 0 | 0 | 2 | 0 | 2 | 9 |
| Ryan/Ryan | 0 | 1 | 0 | 1 | 2 | 0 | 2 | 0 | 6 |

| Sheet 2 | 1 | 2 | 3 | 4 | 5 | 6 | 7 | 8 | Final |
| Read/Read | 0 | 0 | 0 | 0 | 3 | 0 | 2 | 0 | 5 |
| Coleman/Cornfield 🔨 | 1 | 1 | 1 | 1 | 0 | 3 | 0 | 1 | 8 |

| Sheet 3 | 1 | 2 | 3 | 4 | 5 | 6 | 7 | 8 | 9 | Final |
| Fitzgerald/Pickle | 0 | 0 | 2 | 0 | 2 | 0 | 4 | 0 | 2 | 10 |
| Lemke/Lemke 🔨 | 1 | 2 | 0 | 2 | 0 | 1 | 0 | 2 | 0 | 8 |

| Sheet 4 | 1 | 2 | 3 | 4 | 5 | 6 | 7 | 8 | Final |
| Roessler/Gebert | 0 | 1 | 0 | 0 | 2 | 0 | 0 | X | 3 |
| Haskell/Haskell 🔨 | 2 | 0 | 3 | 1 | 0 | 2 | 1 | X | 9 |

==== Draw 8 ====
Friday, December 8, 5:00pm CT

| Sheet 1 | 1 | 2 | 3 | 4 | 5 | 6 | 7 | 8 | Final |
| Summer/Mazzotta | 1 | 0 | 2 | 2 | 0 | 3 | 0 | 2 | 10 |
| Nelson/Hemenway 🔨 | 0 | 1 | 0 | 0 | 1 | 0 | 2 | 0 | 4 |

| Sheet 2 | 1 | 2 | 3 | 4 | 5 | 6 | 7 | 8 | Final |
| Gibeau/Gibeau 🔨 | 0 | 0 | 0 | 1 | 0 | 1 | 1 | 1 | 4 |
| Gilbertson/Haworth | 1 | 1 | 1 | 0 | 2 | 0 | 0 | 0 | 5 |

| Sheet 3 | 1 | 2 | 3 | 4 | 5 | 6 | 7 | 8 | Final |
| Konno/Lundeen 🔨 | 6 | 1 | 0 | 0 | 3 | 1 | 0 | 0 | 11 |
| Clark/Clark | 0 | 0 | 4 | 3 | 0 | 0 | 2 | 1 | 10 |

| Sheet 4 | 1 | 2 | 3 | 4 | 5 | 6 | 7 | 8 | Final |
| Potter/Potter 🔨 | 0 | 0 | 4 | 2 | 0 | 4 | 0 | 1 | 11 |
| Delaney/Abrahamson | 1 | 2 | 0 | 0 | 1 | 0 | 1 | 0 | 5 |

==== Draw 9 ====
Friday, December 5, 8:00pm CT

| Sheet 1 | 1 | 2 | 3 | 4 | 5 | 6 | 7 | 8 | Final |
| Lemke/Lemke | 2 | 0 | 1 | 0 | 4 | 0 | 1 | 0 | 8 |
| Haskell/Haskell 🔨 | 0 | 1 | 0 | 2 | 0 | 1 | 0 | 1 | 5 |

| Sheet 2 | 1 | 2 | 3 | 4 | 5 | 6 | 7 | 8 | Final |
| Fitzgerald/Pickle | 0 | 1 | 0 | 1 | 0 | 0 | 0 | X | 2 |
| Roessler/Gebert 🔨 | 1 | 0 | 4 | 0 | 1 | 1 | 1 | X | 8 |

| Sheet 3 | 1 | 2 | 3 | 4 | 5 | 6 | 7 | 8 | Final |
| Ryan/Ryan 🔨 | 0 | 3 | 1 | 2 | 1 | 0 | 1 | X | 8 |
| Coleman/Cornfield | 1 | 0 | 0 | 0 | 0 | 1 | 0 | X | 2 |

| Sheet 4 | 1 | 2 | 3 | 4 | 5 | 6 | 7 | 8 | Final |
| Lopac/Hoffoss | 1 | 0 | 0 | 1 | 1 | 2 | 0 | 1 | 6 |
| Read/Read 🔨 | 0 | 1 | 1 | 0 | 0 | 0 | 2 | 0 | 4 |

==== Draw 10 ====
Saturday, December 9, 8:00am CT

| Sheet 1 | 1 | 2 | 3 | 4 | 5 | 6 | 7 | 8 | Final |
| Clark/Clark 🔨 | 1 | 0 | 1 | 1 | 0 | 0 | 2 | 1 | 6 |
| Potter/Potter | 0 | 1 | 0 | 0 | 2 | 2 | 0 | 0 | 5 |

| Sheet 2 | 1 | 2 | 3 | 4 | 5 | 6 | 7 | 8 | Final |
| Konno/Lundeen 🔨 | 0 | 1 | 1 | 3 | 1 | 0 | 1 | 0 | 7 |
| Delaney/Abrahamson | 2 | 0 | 0 | 0 | 0 | 1 | 0 | 2 | 5 |

| Sheet 3 | Final |
| Nelson/Hemenway (forfeit) | L |
| Gilbertson/Haworth 🔨 | W |

| Sheet 4 | 1 | 2 | 3 | 4 | 5 | 6 | 7 | 8 | Final |
| Summer/Mazzotta | 0 | 1 | 0 | 0 | 4 | 1 | 0 | X | 6 |
| Gibeau/Gibeau 🔨 | 4 | 0 | 4 | 1 | 0 | 0 | 3 | X | 12 |

==== Draw 11 ====
Saturday, December 6, 11:00am CT

| Sheet 1 | 1 | 2 | 3 | 4 | 5 | 6 | 7 | 8 | Final |
| Read/Read 🔨 | 0 | 0 | 1 | 1 | 0 | 2 | 0 | 0 | 4 |
| Fitzgerald/Pickle | 2 | 1 | 0 | 0 | 1 | 0 | 2 | 1 | 7 |

| Sheet 2 | 1 | 2 | 3 | 4 | 5 | 6 | 7 | 8 | Final |
| Haskell/Haskell 🔨 | 1 | 1 | 1 | 1 | 0 | 4 | 0 | X | 8 |
| Ryan/Ryan | 0 | 0 | 0 | 0 | 1 | 0 | 1 | X | 2 |

| Sheet 3 | 1 | 2 | 3 | 4 | 5 | 6 | 7 | 8 | Final |
| Lemke/Lemke 🔨 | 2 | 0 | 0 | 1 | 2 | 0 | 3 | 0 | 8 |
| Lopac/Hoffoss | 0 | 1 | 1 | 0 | 0 | 3 | 0 | 1 | 6 |

| Sheet 4 | 1 | 2 | 3 | 4 | 5 | 6 | 7 | 8 | Final |
| Coleman/Cornfield | 0 | 0 | 2 | 0 | 1 | 1 | 0 | 0 | 4 |
| Roessler/Gebert 🔨 | 2 | 3 | 0 | 1 | 0 | 0 | 1 | 1 | 8 |

==== Draw 12 ====
Saturday, December 9, 2:00pm CT

| Sheet 1 | 1 | 2 | 3 | 4 | 5 | 6 | 7 | 8 | Final |
| Gibeau/Gibeau | 1 | 0 | 0 | 0 | 0 | 0 | X | X | 1 |
| Konno/Lundeen 🔨 | 0 | 4 | 3 | 3 | 1 | 1 | X | X | 12 |

| Sheet 2 | 1 | 2 | 3 | 4 | 5 | 6 | 7 | 8 | Final |
| Potter/Potter 🔨 | 0 | 1 | 2 | 1 | 2 | 3 | 2 | X | 11 |
| Nelson/Hemenway | 1 | 0 | 0 | 0 | 0 | 0 | 0 | X | 1 |

| Sheet 3 | 1 | 2 | 3 | 4 | 5 | 6 | 7 | 8 | Final |
| Clark/Clark 🔨 | 5 | 0 | 3 | 2 | 0 | 1 | 0 | X | 11 |
| Summer/Mazzotta | 0 | 1 | 0 | 0 | 1 | 0 | 1 | X | 3 |

| Sheet 4 | 1 | 2 | 3 | 4 | 5 | 6 | 7 | 8 | Final |
| Gilbertson/Haworth 🔨 | 3 | 0 | 3 | 0 | 0 | 1 | 0 | 3 | 10 |
| Delaney/Abrahamson | 0 | 2 | 0 | 1 | 1 | 0 | 2 | 0 | 6 |

==== Draw 13 ====
Saturday, December 6, 5:00pm CT

| Sheet 1 | 1 | 2 | 3 | 4 | 5 | 6 | 7 | 8 | Final |
| Roessler/Gebert | 0 | 0 | 1 | 1 | 0 | 0 | 1 | X | 3 |
| Lemke/Lemke 🔨 | 2 | 1 | 0 | 0 | 1 | 4 | 0 | X | 8 |

| Sheet 2 | 1 | 2 | 3 | 4 | 5 | 6 | 7 | 8 | Final |
| Coleman/Cornfield 🔨 | 1 | 1 | 4 | 1 | 1 | 1 | X | X | 9 |
| Lopac/Hoffoss | 0 | 0 | 0 | 0 | 0 | 0 | X | X | 0 |

| Sheet 3 | 1 | 2 | 3 | 4 | 5 | 6 | 7 | 8 | Final |
| Haskell/Haskell | 0 | 3 | 0 | 0 | 1 | 4 | 1 | X | 9 |
| Fitzgerald/Pickle 🔨 | 1 | 0 | 1 | 1 | 0 | 0 | 0 | X | 3 |

| Sheet 4 | 1 | 2 | 3 | 4 | 5 | 6 | 7 | 8 | Final |
| Read/Read | 0 | 0 | 2 | 1 | 0 | 1 | 0 | 1 | 5 |
| Ryan/Ryan 🔨 | 4 | 1 | 0 | 0 | 1 | 0 | 1 | 0 | 7 |

==== Draw 14 ====
Saturday, December 9, 8:00pm CT

| Sheet 1 | 1 | 2 | 3 | 4 | 5 | 6 | 7 | 8 | Final |
| Delaney/Abrahamson 🔨 | 1 | 0 | 0 | 0 | 3 | 0 | X | X | 4 |
| Clark/Clark | 0 | 6 | 1 | 1 | 0 | 3 | X | X | 11 |

| Sheet 2 | 1 | 2 | 3 | 4 | 5 | 6 | 7 | 8 | Final |
| Gilbertson/Haworth | 1 | 0 | 2 | 0 | 2 | 0 | 3 | 0 | 8 |
| Summer/Mazzotta 🔨 | 0 | 1 | 0 | 2 | 0 | 1 | 0 | 1 | 5 |

| Sheet 3 | 1 | 2 | 3 | 4 | 5 | 6 | 7 | 8 | Final |
| Potter/Potter 🔨 | 0 | 3 | 2 | 0 | 4 | 0 | 4 | X | 13 |
| Konno/Lundeen | 2 | 0 | 0 | 3 | 0 | 3 | 0 | X | 8 |

| Sheet 4 | 1 | 2 | 3 | 4 | 5 | 6 | 7 | 8 | Final |
| Gibeau/Gibeau | 0 | 3 | 0 | 0 | 0 | 2 | 0 | 4 | 9 |
| Nelson/Hemenway 🔨 | 3 | 0 | 2 | 1 | 1 | 0 | 1 | 0 | 8 |

== Playoffs ==
The playoffs consisted of a simple 4-team, 2-round bracket.

=== Bracket ===
Semifinals
Kono/Lundeen | 4
Haskell/Haskell | 9
Clark/Clark | 7
Lemke/Lemke | 4

Final
Clark/Clark | 8
Haskell/Haskell | 7

=== Semifinals ===
Sunday, December 7, 9:00am CT

| Team | 1 | 2 | 3 | 4 | 5 | 6 | 7 | 8 | Final |
| Kono/Lundeen | 0 | 1 | 0 | 0 | 1 | 0 | 2 | 0 | 4 |
| Haskell/Haskell 🔨 | 1 | 0 | 3 | 1 | 0 | 3 | 0 | 1 | 9 |

| Team | 1 | 2 | 3 | 4 | 5 | 6 | 7 | 8 | Final |
| Clark/Clark 🔨 | 4 | 0 | 1 | 0 | 1 | 0 | 0 | 1 | 7 |
| Lemke/Lemke | 0 | 1 | 0 | 1 | 0 | 1 | 1 | 0 | 4 |

=== Final ===
Sunday, December 7, 12:00pm CT

| Team | 1 | 2 | 3 | 4 | 5 | 6 | 7 | 8 | Final |
| Clark/Clark 🔨 | 1 | 1 | 0 | 4 | 2 | 0 | 0 | 0 | 8 |
| Haskell/Haskell | 0 | 0 | 3 | 0 | 0 | 1 | 2 | 1 | 7 |
