= Cristin Clark =

American curler

- Curler
- Born: Lynnwood, Washington, United States

Team
- Curling club: Granite CC, Seattle, Washington

Curling career
- Member Association: United States
- World Mixed Doubles Championship: 3 (2009, 2011, 2012)
Medal record
Curling
United States Mixed Doubles Championship
Gold medal – first place	2009 Two Harbors
Gold medal – first place	2011 Duluth
Gold medal – first place	2012 Wayland
Silver medal – second place	2010 Seattle
Bronze medal – third place	2008 Bemidji

Cristin Clark is an American curler.

At the international level, she curled for the United States at three World Mixed Doubles Curling Championships and one World Mixed Curling Championship.

At the national level, she is a ten-time United States mixed champion curler and a three-time United States mixed doubles champion curler. Her women's team was the USA Curling Team of the Year in 2009 and 2012.

== Private life ==
Clark's former husband is fellow curler Brady Clark; together, they won the United States Mixed Championship ten times and the United States Mixed Doubles Championship three times. They have one son, Sean.

== Teams ==
=== Women's ===
Season	Skip	Third	Second	Lead	Alternate	Coach	Events
2001–02	Cristin Clark	Bev Walter	Kim Kropp	Tammy Lehto		Brady Clark	2002 USWCC (8th)
2003–04	Cristin Clark	Becky Dobie	Liz Ziegler	Kelly Snider		Brady Clark	2004 USWCC (7th)
2004–05	Amy Wright	Cristin Clark	Stephanie Roland	Lisa Rugen			2005 USWCC/USOCT (5th)
2005–06	Cristin Clark	Charissa Lin	Tanya Jakobsen	Mary McHugh			2006 USWCC (5th)
2006–07	Cristin Clark	Charissa Lin	Nina Reiniger	Janice Langanke			2007 USWCC (6th)
2008–09	Cristin Clark	Charissa Lin	Nina Reiniger	Janice Langanke			
2008–09	Cristin Clark	Sharon Vukich	Emily Good	Katy Sharpe	Gabrielle Coleman		2009 USWCC/USOCT (9th)
2011–12	Cristin Clark	Emily Good	Elle LeBeau	Sharon Vukich		Brady Clark	
2012–13	Cristin Clark	Patti Killins	Christina Pastula	Christie Wilhelmy			2013 USWCC (7th)
2014–15	Cristin Clark	Regan Birr	Sara Shuster	Kim Rheaume			
2014–15	Cristin Clark	Regan Birr	Cait Flannery	Jamie Kraus			
2015–16	Cristin Clark	Regan Birr	Sherri Schummer	Bambi Laing			
2016–17	Cristin Clark	Emily Anderson	Kathleen Dubberstein	Sherri Schummer			2017 USWCC (7th)

=== Mixed ===
Season	Skip	Third	Second	Lead	Coach	Events
2000–01	Brady Clark	Cristin Clark	?	?		2001 USMxCC (bronze)
2001–02	Brady Clark	Cristin Clark	Jason Larway	Kim Kropp		2002 USMXCC (gold)
2002–03	Brady Clark	Cristin Clark	Ryan Beighton	Bev Walter		2003 USMXCC (gold)
2003–04	Brady Clark	Cristin Clark	?	?		2004 USMXCC (silver)
2004–05	Brady Clark	Cristin Clark	Darren Lehto	Bev Walter		2005 USMXCC (gold)
2005–06	Brady Clark	Cristin Clark	Tom Violette	Bev Walter		2006 USMXCC (gold)
2006–07	Brady Clark	Cristin Clark	Leon Romaniuk	Bev Walter		2007 USMXCC (gold)
2007–08	Brady Clark	Cristin Clark	Philip Tilker	Bev Walter		2008 USMXCC (6th)
2008–09	Brady Clark	Cristin Clark	Philip Tilker	Bev Walter		2009 USMXCC (gold)
2009–10	Brady Clark	Cristin Clark	Philip Tilker	Bev Walter		2010 USMXCC (gold)
2010–11	Brady Clark	Cristin Clark	Philip Tilker	Bev Walter		2011 USMXCC (gold)
2011–12	Brady Clark	Cristin Clark	Sean Beighton	Bev Walter		2012 USMXCC (gold)
2012–13	Doug Kauffman	Cristin Clark	Peter Sommer	Bob Knievel		
2013–14	Brady Clark	Cristin Clark	Derrick McLean	Beverly Hale		2014 USMXCC (bronze)
2014–15	Brady Clark	Cristin Clark	Sean Beighton	Jillian Walker	Neil Doese	2015 USMXCC (gold); 2015 WMXCC (5th)

=== Mixed doubles ===
Season	Female	Male	Coach	Events
2007–08	Cristin Clark	Brady Clark		2008 USMDCC (bronze)
2008–09	Cristin Clark	Brady Clark		2009 USMDCC (gold); 2009 WMDCC (18th)
2009–10	Cristin Clark	Sean Beighton		2010 USMDCC (silver)
2010–11	Cristin Clark	Brady Clark		2011 USMDCC (gold); 2011 WMDCC (8th)
2011–12	Cristin Clark	Brady Clark	Beverly Walter	2012 USMDCC (gold); 2012 WMDCC (4th)
2012–13	Cristin Clark	Brady Clark		2013 USMDCC (5th)
2013–14	Cristin Clark	Brady Clark		2014 USMDCC (5th)
2014–15	Cristin Clark	Brady Clark		2015 USMDCC (5th)
2015–16	Cristin Clark	Brady Clark		2016 USMDCC (7th)
2019–20	Cristin Clark	Chris Bond		2020 USMDCC (9th)
