= Brady Clark (curler) =

American curler

- Curler
- Born: September 12, 1977 (age 49); Grand Forks, North Dakota, U.S.

Team
- Curling club: Granite CC, Seattle, Washington
- Skip: Brady Clark
- Third: Greg Persinger
- Second: Colin Hufman
- Lead: Phil Tilker

Curling career
- World Championship: 1 (2013)
- World Mixed Doubles Championship: 3 (2009, 2011, 2012)
Medal record
Curling
Representing Washington
US Men's Championship
Gold medal – first place	2016 Jacksonville
Gold medal – first place	2013 Green Bay
Bronze medal – third place	2017 Everett
Bronze medal – third place	2006 Bemidji
US Olympic Trials
Bronze medal – third place	2005 Madison	Team
US Mixed Doubles Championship
Gold medal – first place	2009 Two Harbors
Gold medal – first place	2011 Duluth
Gold medal – first place	2012 Wayland

Brady Clark (born September 12, 1977) is an American curler from Lynnwood, Washington. Clark is a ten-time national mixed champion, three-time national mixed doubles champion, and two-time national men's champion (2013 & 2016). He has played in three World Mixed Doubles Curling Championships and one World Men's Championship.

== Career ==
As a junior, Clark played in five national junior championships, placing 3rd in 1998 and 1999. He also won the National College Tournament in 1999. Following juniors, Clark went on to play in nine national men's championships, 12 national mixed championships, and five national mixed doubles championships. He won the 2013 and 2016 United States Men's Curling Championship. He has won 10 national mixed championships, winning in 2002, 2003, 2005, 2006, 2007, 2009, 2010, 2011 and 2012 & 2015. He has also won three national mixed doubles championships, in 2009, 2011 and 2012. These three national mixed doubles championships qualified him to play in the corresponding World Mixed Doubles championships. In 2009, Clark, and his teammate and his then-wife, Cristin would finish the tournament with a 3–5 record in their group, finishing 18th place over all. In 2011, the two Clarks went 5–2 in their group and lost in the quarterfinal to France. In 2012, Cristin and Brady finished 6–2 in their group, won their quarter final match against China, but lost in the semi-final to Switzerland and the bronze medal game to Austria.

In the men's curling realm, Clark broke through at the 2013 United States Men's Curling Championship, finishing tied for third in the standings and qualifying for the playoffs through a tiebreaker. Clark defeated defending champion Heath McCormick, John Shuster, and Tyler George en route to securing his first national championship title, the first for the Granite Curling Club since 2004. Clark and his team then represented the United States at the 2013 Ford World Men's Curling Championship, finishing in ninth place with a 5–6 win–loss record, and fell short of qualifying the United States directly into the main tournament of the 2014 Winter Olympics by one win. Clark's team also won the 2016 US Men's National Championship in Jacksonville, FL in February 2016.

Upon their semifinal win at the 2013 United States Men's Curling Championship, Clark and his team were qualified to participate at the 2014 United States Olympic Curling Trials.

== Personal life ==
Clark's former wife Cristin is also a curler and they won the United States Mixed National Championship ten times together. Clark proposed to Cristin at the local curling rink.

== Grand Slam record ==
Clark qualified for his first career Grand Slam event, the 2016 Humpty's Champions Cup by winning the 2016 U.S. Championship.

Key
C	Champion
F	Lost in Final
SF	Lost in Semifinal
QF	Lost in Quarterfinals
R16	Lost in the round of 16
Q	Did not advance to playoffs
T2	Played in Tier 2 event
DNP	Did not participate in event
N/A	Not a Grand Slam event that season

Event	2015–16	2016-17
Tour Challenge	DNP	T2
Masters	DNP	DNP
The National	DNP	
Canadian Open	DNP	
Elite 10	DNP	
Players'	DNP	
Champions Cup	Q	
