= Peter Stolt =

American curler

- Curler
- Born: March 26, 1979 (age 47); Wisconsin, U.S.

Team
- Mixed doubles partner: Maureen Stolt

Curling career
- Member Association: United States
- World Mixed Doubles Championship: 1 (2013)
Medal record
Curling
Representing United States
United States Mixed Doubles Curling Championship
Gold medal – first place	2013 Bismarck
Silver medal – second place	2014 Medford
Silver medal – second place	2015 Eau Claire
Silver medal – second place	2018 Eau Claire
United States Mixed Curling Championship
Bronze medal – third place	2023 Denver

Peter Stolt (born August 15, 1978) is an American curler from Plymouth, Minnesota.

Stolt competes with his wife Maureen Stolt in mixed doubles competition. Together they have won the United States Mixed Doubles Curling Championship once (in 2013), and finished in second place three times. Their national championship in 2013 earned them the right to represent the US at the 2013 World Mixed Doubles Curling Championship, where they finished in fourth place in the Yellow Pool.
