= Maureen Stolt =

American curler (born 1979)

- Curler
- Born: March 26, 1979 (age 47); Rush Lake, Saskatchewan

Team
- Mixed doubles partner: Peter Stolt

Curling career
- Member Association: United States
- World Mixed Doubles Championship: 1 (2013)
Medal record
Curling
Representing United States
United States Mixed Doubles Curling Championship
Gold medal – first place	2013 Bismarck
Silver medal – second place	2014 Medford
Silver medal – second place	2015 Eau Claire
Silver medal – second place	2018 Eau Claire

Maureen Stolt (born March 3, 1979) is an American curler from Plymouth, Minnesota.

Stolt competes with her husband, Peter Stolt, in mixed doubles competition. Together they have won the United States Mixed Doubles Curling Championship once, in 2013, and finished in second place three times. Their national championship in 2013 earned them the right to represent the US at the 2013 World Mixed Doubles Curling Championship, where they finished in fourth place in the Yellow Pool.
