= United States U18 Curling Championships =

USA Curling U18 Championship History

Beginning in 2017, USA Curling began a U18 National Championship to further promote the sport of curling. Teams qualify through the a regional playdown process, utilizing USCA 10 geographic regions. The U18 Nationals is also one of USCA twelve National Championship events.

Eligibility

Any player who is less than 18 years of age at any time during the 30th day of June of the year immediately preceding the year the competition is to take place, and is a resident (no minimum residency required) of the United States as of registration deadline. All players must be members of a USCA member club within the registered region.

Past Champions

Women:

Year	Site	Skip	Third	Second	Lead	Winning Club	Region
2017	Cedarburg, WI	Cait Flannery	Leah Yavarow	Rebecca Miles	Mackenzie Ritchie	Mankato, MN	Minnesota Curling Association
2018	Bemidji, MN	Leah Yavarow	Mairin Barret	Abigail Page	Damaris Berg	Bemidji, MN	Minnesota Curling Association
2019	Chaska, MN	Susan Dudt	Sydney Mullaney	Nadezhda Tschumakow	Alina Tschumakow	Potomac, MD	GNCC
2020	Wausau, WI					Cancelled	
2021						Cancelled	
2022	Fort Wayne, IN	Miranda Scheel	Ella Flemming	Tessa Thurlow	Rilee Kraft	Capital	Dakota
2023	Lafayette, CO	Sophia Ryhorchuk	Morgan Zacher	Allie Giroux	Brooke Giroux	Four Seasons Curling Club	Minnesota Curling Association
2024	Lafayette, CO	Julia Pekowitz	Addison Neill	Megan Stopera	Alexandra Pekowitz	Wayland, MA	At Large
2025	Lafayette, CO	Allory Johnson	Gianna Johnson	Bailey Vaydich	Madeleine Muscatell	Four Seasons Curling Club	Minnesota Curling Association

Men:

Year	Site	Skip	Third	Second	Lead	Winning club	Region
2017	Cedarburg, WI	Michael Elwing	Trevor Marquardt	Connor Hipke/Ryan Elwing	Tyler Hipke	Wauwatosa, WI	Wisconsin State Curling Association
2018	Bemidji, MN	Riley Fensen	Graem Fensen	Charlie Thompson	Carson Liapis	Bemidji, MN	Minnesota Curling Association
2019	Chaska, MN	Kevin Tuma	Sidney Harris	Michael Mattson	Austin Bengtson	St. Paul, MN	Minnesota Curling Association
2020	Wausau, WI					Cancelled	
2021						Cancelled	
2022	Fort Wayne, IN	Sidney Harris	Mason Guentzel	Will Podhradsky	Stuart Strack	St. Paul Chaska	Minnesota Curling Association
2023	Lafayette, CO	Caden Hebert	Jackson Bestland	Benji Paral	Jack Wendtland/Shane Nelson	Eau Claire, WI	Wisconsin State Curling Association
2024	Lafayette, CO	Caden Hebert	Jackson Bestland	Benji Paral	Jack Wendtland/Shane Nelson	Eau Claire, WI	Wisconsin State Curling Association
2025	Lafayette, CO	Mason Guentzel	Will Podhradsky	Leighton Hines	Jackson Askew	Chaska Curling	Minnesota Curling Association
