= San Francisco Bay Area Curling Club =

Non-profit corporation

- Location: 8450 Enterprise Way; Oakland, California 94621

Information
- Established: 1958
- Club type: Dedicated
- USCA region: Mountain Pacific
- Sheets of ice: Five
- Rock colors: Red, Yellow, and Blue
- Website: http://www.bayareacurling.com

The San Francisco Bay Area Curling Club (SFBACC) is a non-profit corporation serving the needs for the play and development of the sport of curling in the San Francisco Bay Area and its surrounding outskirts. Headquartered in Oakland, California, it is the largest curling club in California as well as in the Mountain Pacific Curling Association.

The San Francisco Bay Area Curling Club is a registered non-profit corporation in the state of California. The SFBACC is a member of the Mountain Pacific Curling Association and also of the United States Curling Association.

== History ==
The San Francisco Bay Area Curling Club (SFBACC) was founded March 13, 1958 in Mountain View, California. In the club's early years, it had a dedicated curling facility called the Peninsula Curling Rink. By the early 1970's the dedicated facility was closed and the club was curling on arena ice.

Starting in 1994 the SFBACC began curling at Solar4America Ice at San Jose, renting ice for short seasons until 2006 when regular league times were established. Also in 2006 the club expanded to nearby Fremont to begin curling at Solar4America Ice at Fremont. With interest in the sport continuing to grow throughout the San Francisco Bay Area the club expanded again in the summer of 2009 to Oakland.

From 2009 to 2018 the club conducted activities at the three separate locations in San Jose, Fremont, and Oakland. In early 2018 the SFBACC allowed the newly formed Silicon Valley Curling Club (SVCC) to take over all curling activities at Solar4America at San Jose and Solar4America at Fremont.

== Oakland Ice Center ==
Prior to 2018, the SFBACC curled at Oakland Ice Center, located in the city's Uptown district. The rink is owned by the city of Oakland and operated by Sharks Ice, LLC. As of December 2019, the club's affiliation with the Oakland Ice Center had ended.

== Current facilities ==
In March 2022, the club opened a new 5-sheet dedicated facility in East Oakland.

== Events ==
The SFBACC has hosted the Golden Gate Bonspiel annually each spring during Memorial Day weekend since 2008. The tournament was previously held at Solar4America Ice at Fremont and will held at the new dedicated facility in Oakland moving forward.

The club teaches Learn-to-Curl events throughout the year to expose new people to the sport. During the Winter Olympic Games interest is especially high and so the club hosts numerous Learn-to-Curl events, lesson series, and instructional leagues to teach thousands of people.

In October 2013 the SFBACC played host to the World Curling Federation Olympic Celebration Tour, which brought 2010 Olympic silver medalist Carolyn McRorie to Oakland to participate in multiple clinics.

== Competitive titles ==
- 2013 USCA Arena Curling Women's National Championship - Silver Medal
- 2014 USCA Arena Curling Women's National Championship - Bronze Medal
- 2015 USCA Arena Curling Women's National Championship - Gold Medal
- 2016 USCA Arena Curling Women's National Championship - Gold Medal
- 2017 USCA Arena Curling Women's National Championship - Bronze Medal
- 2018 USCA Arena Curling Men's National Championship - Silver Medal
