= United States Junior Mixed Doubles Curling Championship =

The United States Junior Mixed Doubles Curling Championship is the national championship of mixed doubles curling (one man and one woman) in the United States. Junior level curlers must be under the age of 21. It has been held annually since the 2024–2025 season. The championships are organized by the United States Curling Association (USCA).

== List of champions and medallists ==
Team line-ups shows in order: woman, man, coach (if exists).

Year	Host city, dates	Champion	Runner-up	Bronze	Placement at Worlds
2025	Duluth, MN	Heidi Holt / Zachary Brenden	Gianna Johnson / Will Podhradsky	Ella Wendling / Benji Paral	5
2026	Falmouth, MA	Ella Wendling / Benji Paral	Jersey Hollands / Connor Grabow	Allory Johnson / Caden Hebert	13

== See also ==
- United States Men's Curling Championship
- United States Women's Curling Championship
- United States Mixed Curling Championship
- United States Mixed Doubles Curling Championship
- United States Junior Curling Championships
- United States Senior Curling Championships
