= 2026 Canadian Under-21 Mixed Doubles Championship =

Curling tournament

- Host city: Sudbury, Ontario
- Arena: Gerry McCrory Countryside Sports Complex
- Dates: March 24–27
- Winner: (Ontario) Ideson / Henry
- Curling club: Ilderton CC, Ilderton
- Female: Brooklyn Ideson
- Male: Owen Henry
- Finalist: (Alberta) Evans / Dalrymple

The 2026 Canadian Under-21 Mixed Doubles Championship was held from March 24 to 27 at the Gerry McCrory Countryside Sports Complex in Sudbury, Ontario. The winning pair of Brooklyn Ideson and Owen Henry will represent Canada at the 2026 World Junior Mixed Doubles Curling Championship in Edmonton, Alberta. The event was held in conjunction with the 2026 Canadian Junior Curling Championships.

== Qualification process ==
Teams qualified for the national championship by earning a spot from two qualifying events — one each in Eastern and Western Canada — that were held in November 2025.

Means of Qualification	Vacancies	Qualified
East Qualifier	4	(Quebec) Lafrance / Tremblay (Ontario) Ideson / Henry (Nova Scotia) McDonah / McCurdy (Ontario) Marcolini / Jewell
West Qualifier	4	(Alberta) Richards / Davies (Alberta) Evans / Dalrymple (Alberta) Yarmuch / Sawiak (Alberta) Yarmuch / Hlushak
TOTAL	8	

== Teams ==
The teams are listed as follows:

Female	Male	Province	Club(s)
Bethany Evans	Sahil Dalrymple	Alberta	Saville Community SC, Edmonton
Brooklyn Ideson	Owen Henry	Ontario	Ilderton CC, Ilderton
Megan Lafrance	Raphaël Tremblay	Quebec	CC Kénogami, Jonquière & CC Grand-Mère, Shawinigan
Kelsea Marcolini	Nathan Jewell	Ontario	Acton CC, Acton
Olivia McDonah	Christopher McCurdy	Nova Scotia	Truro CC, Truro
Gracelyn Richards	Zach Davies	Alberta	Saville Community SC, Edmonton
Sarah Yarmuch	Peter Hlushak	Alberta	Saville Community SC, Edmonton
Emma Yarmuch	Lucas Sawiak	Alberta	Saville Community SC, Edmonton

== Round robin standings ==
Final Round Robin Standings

Key
Teams to Playoffs

Team	W	L	W–L	PF	PA	EW	EL	BE	SE	LSD
(Ontario) Ideson / Henry	5	2	1–0	52	39	24	25	0	9	20.46
(Alberta) Evans / Dalrymple	5	2	0–1	51	45	30	25	0	9	43.43
(Alberta) Richards / Davies	4	3	1–0	46	44	27	28	0	10	22.62
(Nova Scotia) McDonah / McCurdy	4	3	0–1	49	38	32	23	0	12	48.39
(Alberta) Yarmuch / Sawiak	3	4	1–0	53	44	28	27	0	9	41.23
(Quebec) Lafrance / Tremblay	3	4	0–1	42	49	26	29	0	7	43.28
(Alberta) Yarmuch / Hlushak	2	5	1–0	36	56	20	31	0	5	39.10
(Ontario) Marcolini / Jewell	2	5	0–1	42	56	28	27	0	7	44.78

Round Robin Summary Table
Pos.	Team	(Alberta) E/D	(Ontario) I/H	(Quebec) L/T	(Ontario) M/J	(Nova Scotia) M/M	(Alberta) R/D	(Alberta) Y/H	(Alberta) Y/S	Record
2	(Alberta) Evans / Dalrymple	—	6–8	7–6	6–5	9–8	11–3	4–8	8–7	5–2
1	(Ontario) Ideson / Henry	8–6	—	9–1	9–10	0–8	7–4	9–3	10–7	5–2
6	(Quebec) Lafrance / Tremblay	6–7	1–9	—	9–3	6–5	5–9	8–7	7–9	3–4
8	(Ontario) Marcolini / Jewell	5–6	10–9	3–9	—	5–7	8–7	7–9	4–9	2–5
4	(Nova Scotia) McDonah / McCurdy	8–9	8–0	5–6	7–5	—	5–6	9–6	7–6	4–3
3	(Alberta) Richards / Davies	3–11	4–7	9–5	7–8	6–5	—	10–2	7–6	4–3
7	(Alberta) Yarmuch / Hlushak	8–4	3–9	7–8	9–7	6–9	2–10	—	1–9	2–5
5	(Alberta) Yarmuch / Sawiak	7–8	7–10	9–7	9–4	6–7	6–7	9–1	—	3–4

== Round robin results ==
All draws are listed in Eastern Time (UTC−04:00).

=== Draw 1 ===
Tuesday, March 24, 2:00 pm

Sheet A	1	2	3	4	5	6	7	8	Final
(Quebec) Lafrance / Tremblay 🔨	0	0	1	0	0	0	X	X	1
(Ontario) Ideson / Henry	1	1	0	5	1	1	X	X	9

Sheet B	1	2	3	4	5	6	7	8	Final
(Nova Scotia) McDonah / McCurdy	0	3	0	2	0	2	0	X	7
(Ontario) Marcolini / Jewell 🔨	1	0	1	0	1	0	2	X	5

Sheet C	1	2	3	4	5	6	7	8	Final
(Alberta) Richards / Davies	0	3	0	0	0	0	0	X	3
(Alberta) Evans / Dalrymple 🔨	3	0	3	1	1	2	1	X	11

Sheet D	1	2	3	4	5	6	7	8	Final
(Alberta) Yarmuch / Sawiak 🔨	1	3	2	1	0	2	X	X	9
(Alberta) Yarmuch / Hlushak	0	0	0	0	1	0	X	X	1

=== Draw 2 ===
Tuesday, March 24, 7:00 pm

Sheet A	1	2	3	4	5	6	7	8	Final
(Nova Scotia) McDonah / McCurdy 🔨	0	1	0	3	0	3	0	1	8
(Alberta) Evans / Dalrymple	3	0	3	0	1	0	2	0	9

Sheet B	1	2	3	4	5	6	7	8	9	Final
(Quebec) Lafrance / Tremblay	0	1	1	0	1	1	0	3	1	8
(Alberta) Yarmuch / Hlushak 🔨	1	0	0	2	0	0	4	0	0	7

Sheet C	1	2	3	4	5	6	7	8	Final
(Alberta) Yarmuch / Sawiak	0	0	1	0	4	0	2	X	7
(Ontario) Ideson / Henry 🔨	4	1	0	1	0	4	0	X	10

Sheet D	1	2	3	4	5	6	7	8	9	Final
(Alberta) Richards / Davies 🔨	2	1	0	1	1	0	2	0	0	7
(Ontario) Marcolini / Jewell	0	0	3	0	0	2	0	2	1	8

=== Draw 3 ===
Wednesday, March 25, 9:00 am

Sheet A	1	2	3	4	5	6	7	8	Final
(Alberta) Yarmuch / Sawiak	0	1	3	2	0	0	0	0	6
(Alberta) Richards / Davies 🔨	3	0	0	0	1	1	1	1	7

Sheet B	1	2	3	4	5	6	7	8	Final
(Ontario) Ideson / Henry 🔨	3	0	0	2	0	0	1	2	8
(Alberta) Evans / Dalrymple	0	3	1	0	1	1	0	0	6

Sheet C	1	2	3	4	5	6	7	8	Final
(Alberta) Yarmuch / Hlushak	1	5	0	1	0	1	0	1	9
(Ontario) Marcolini / Jewell 🔨	0	0	3	0	3	0	1	0	7

Sheet D	1	2	3	4	5	6	7	8	Final
(Quebec) Lafrance / Tremblay	0	1	0	3	0	1	0	1	6
(Nova Scotia) McDonah / McCurdy 🔨	2	0	1	0	1	0	1	0	5

=== Draw 4 ===
Wednesday, March 25, 2:00 pm

Sheet A	1	2	3	4	5	6	7	8	Final
(Alberta) Evans / Dalrymple 🔨	2	0	1	0	0	1	0	2	6
(Ontario) Marcolini / Jewell	0	1	0	1	2	0	1	0	5

Sheet B	1	2	3	4	5	6	7	8	9	Final
(Alberta) Yarmuch / Sawiak 🔨	1	1	0	3	0	0	2	0	2	9
(Quebec) Lafrance / Tremblay	0	0	1	0	2	2	0	2	0	7

Sheet C	1	2	3	4	5	6	7	8	9	Final
(Nova Scotia) McDonah / McCurdy	1	0	1	0	1	1	1	0	0	5
(Alberta) Richards / Davies 🔨	0	2	0	2	0	0	0	1	1	6

Sheet D	1	2	3	4	5	6	7	8	Final
(Alberta) Yarmuch / Hlushak	0	0	0	2	1	0	X	X	3
(Ontario) Ideson / Henry 🔨	2	1	1	0	0	5	X	X	9

=== Draw 5 ===
Wednesday, March 25, 7:00 pm

Sheet A	1	2	3	4	5	6	7	8	Final
(Alberta) Richards / Davies 🔨	0	0	3	2	0	1	0	3	9
(Quebec) Lafrance / Tremblay	1	1	0	0	1	0	2	0	5

Sheet B	1	2	3	4	5	6	7	8	9	Final
(Ontario) Marcolini / Jewell	0	1	1	2	0	2	0	3	1	10
(Ontario) Ideson / Henry 🔨	2	0	0	0	2	0	5	0	0	9

Sheet C	1	2	3	4	5	6	7	8	Final
(Alberta) Evans / Dalrymple 🔨	0	0	1	0	2	0	1	X	4
(Alberta) Yarmuch / Hlushak	3	1	0	1	0	3	0	X	8

Sheet D	1	2	3	4	5	6	7	8	9	Final
(Nova Scotia) McDonah / McCurdy	0	0	3	1	1	1	0	0	1	7
(Alberta) Yarmuch / Sawiak 🔨	1	1	0	0	0	0	3	1	0	6

=== Draw 6 ===
Thursday, March 26, 10:00 am

Sheet A	1	2	3	4	5	6	7	8	Final
(Alberta) Yarmuch / Hlushak	0	2	0	0	2	0	2	0	6
(Nova Scotia) McDonah / McCurdy 🔨	1	0	2	2	0	2	0	2	9

Sheet B	1	2	3	4	5	6	7	8	9	Final
(Alberta) Evans / Dalrymple	0	4	0	0	2	0	1	0	1	8
(Alberta) Yarmuch / Sawiak 🔨	1	0	2	1	0	2	0	1	0	7

Sheet C	1	2	3	4	5	6	7	8	Final
(Ontario) Marcolini / Jewell	1	0	1	0	1	0	0	X	3
(Quebec) Lafrance / Tremblay 🔨	0	3	0	2	0	3	1	X	9

Sheet D	1	2	3	4	5	6	7	8	Final
(Ontario) Ideson / Henry	0	1	0	2	0	3	1	X	7
(Alberta) Richards / Davies 🔨	2	0	1	0	1	0	0	X	4

=== Draw 7 ===
Thursday, March 26, 4:00 pm

Sheet A	1	2	3	4	5	6	7	8	Final
(Ontario) Marcolini / Jewell	0	1	1	0	1	0	1	X	4
(Alberta) Yarmuch / Sawiak 🔨	2	0	0	2	0	5	0	X	9

Sheet B	1	2	3	4	5	6	7	8	Final
(Alberta) Yarmuch / Hlushak 🔨	0	1	0	1	0	0	0	X	2
(Alberta) Richards / Davies	1	0	2	0	4	1	2	X	10

Sheet C	1	2	3	4	5	6	7	8	Final
(Ontario) Ideson / Henry	0	0	0	0	0	0	X	X	0
(Nova Scotia) McDonah / McCurdy 🔨	1	1	2	1	1	2	X	X	8

Sheet D	1	2	3	4	5	6	7	8	Final
(Alberta) Evans / Dalrymple	0	1	0	2	2	1	0	1	7
(Quebec) Lafrance / Tremblay 🔨	2	0	3	0	0	0	1	0	6

== Playoffs ==
Semifinal			Final
			1	(Ontario) Ideson / Henry	12
2	(Alberta) Evans / Dalrymple	10	2	(Alberta) Evans / Dalrymple	4
3	(Alberta) Richards / Davies	6

=== Semifinal ===
Friday, March 27, 10:00 am

Sheet A	1	2	3	4	5	6	7	8	Final
(Alberta) Evans / Dalrymple 🔨	2	0	1	2	0	3	0	2	10
(Alberta) Richards / Davies	0	2	0	0	2	0	2	0	6

=== Final ===
Friday, March 27, 4:00 pm

Sheet A	1	2	3	4	5	6	7	8	Final
(Ontario) Ideson / Henry	3	4	0	1	0	4	X	X	12
(Alberta) Evans / Dalrymple 🔨	0	0	2	0	2	0	X	X	4

== Qualification Events ==
=== East – Guelph ===
November 26–30, Guelph Curling Club, Guelph, Ontario

==== A Event ====
First Knockout	Qualifier 1
(Nova Scotia) Fisher / Fisher	8
(Quebec) Bédard / Robert	6	(Quebec) Bédard / Robert	5
(Ontario) Tellier / Winters	5	(Nova Scotia) Fisher / Fisher	3
(Quebec) Lafrance / Tremblay	7
(Quebec) Lafrance / Tremblay	8
(Manitoba) Eagles / Steski	7
(Quebec) Lafrance / Tremblay	9
(Quebec) Bédard / Bédard	3
(Ontario) Flanagan / Stockton	4
(Ontario) Thompson / MacDougall	5	(Ontario) Fish / Gallacher	7
(Ontario) Fish / Gallacher	8	(Ontario) Fish / Gallacher	4
(Quebec) Bédard / Bédard	8
(Quebec) Bédard / Bédard	8
(Ontario) Norman / Rowe	5	(Ontario) Hardwick / Genjaga	5
(Ontario) Hardwick / Genjaga	9

First Knockout	Qualifier 2
(Manitoba) (Nova Scotia) Evason / MacIsaac	3
(Ontario) Symeonides / Kemp	7	(Ontario) Rath / Scriver	6
(Ontario) Rath / Scriver	8	(Ontario) Rath / Scriver	2
(Quebec) Legault / Janidlo	8
(Quebec) Legault / Janidlo	8
(Ontario) Hari / Hari	7
(Quebec) Legault / Janidlo	7
(Ontario) Marcolini / Jewell	5
(Ontario) Fish / Pietrangelo	7
(Ontario) Marcolini / Jewell	10
(Ontario) Marcolini / Jewell	11
(Ontario) Barbosa / Jewell	8
(Alberta) (Nova Scotia) Plett / Mosher	5
(Ontario) Barbosa / Jewell	12	(Ontario) Barbosa / Jewell	9
(Ontario) Brittain / Moretto	2

First Knockout	Qualifier 3
(Ontario) Ideson / Henry	7
(Ontario) Penston / Barbosa	11	(Ontario) Penston / Barbosa	4
(Ontario) Benning / Newport	1	(Ontario) Ideson / Henry	8
(Quebec) Roy / Roy	3
(Ontario) Schaefer / Harwood	5
(Quebec) Roy / Roy	8
(Ontario) Ideson / Henry	6
(Ontario) McClelland / Rowley	3
(Ontario) Sharpe / Nicholls	6
(Ontario) McClelland / Rowley	9
(Ontario) McClelland / Rowley	8
(New Brunswick) Carter / Carr	7
(New Brunswick) Carter / Carr	10
(Manitoba) Buchalter / Strand	9	(Manitoba) Buchalter / Strand	2
(Ontario) Curley / O'Connor	4

First Knockout	Qualifier 4
(Nova Scotia) McDonah / McCurdy	8
(Ontario) Philips / Benning	8	(Ontario) Philips / Benning	6
(Ontario) Fitzgerald / Sherk	7	(Nova Scotia) McDonah / McCurdy	9
(Ontario) Anderson / Anderson	7
(Ontario) Anderson / Anderson	8
(Ontario) Digiglio / Miskiw	2
(Nova Scotia) McDonah / McCurdy	6
(Ontario) Frlan / MacTavish	5
(Ontario) Ferguson / Keon	4
(Ontario) Padoin-Lee / Del Conte	9
(Ontario) Padoin-Lee / Del Conte	4
(Ontario) Frlan / MacTavish	6
(Ontario) Frlan / MacTavish	8
(Manitoba) Ostrowsky / Strand	8	(Manitoba) Ostrowsky / Strand	3
(Ontario) Adair / McCutcheon	2

==== B Event ====
Second Knockout	Qualifier 5
(Ontario) Fish / Gallacher	7
(Ontario) Hardwick / Genjaga	3	(Ontario) Thompson / MacDougall	10
(Ontario) Thompson / MacDougall	10	(Ontario) Thompson / MacDougall	9
(Nova Scotia) Fisher / Fisher	6
(Nova Scotia) Fisher / Fisher	7
(Ontario) Tellier / Winters	8	(Ontario) Tellier / Winters	1
(Ontario) Flanagan / Stockton	3	(Ontario) Thompson / MacDougall	10
(Quebec) Bédard / Bédard	11
(Quebec) Bédard / Bédard	8
(Ontario) Norman / Rowe	3
(Manitoba) Eagles / Steski	4
(Quebec) Bédard / Robert	4	(Ontario) Norman / Rowe	7
(Ontario) Norman / Rowe	10

Second Knockout	Qualifier 6
(Ontario) Barbosa / Jewell	5
(Ontario) Brittain / Moretto	4	(Manitoba) (Nova Scotia) Evason / MacIsaac	8
(Manitoba) (Nova Scotia) Evason / MacIsaac	8	(Manitoba) (Nova Scotia) Evason / MacIsaac	3
(Alberta) (Nova Scotia) Plett / Mosher	9
(Ontario) Rath / Scriver	4
(Ontario) Symeonides / Kemp	2	(Alberta) (Nova Scotia) Plett / Mosher	8
(Alberta) (Nova Scotia) Plett / Mosher	8	(Alberta) (Nova Scotia) Plett / Mosher	9
(Ontario) Marcolini / Jewell	11
(Ontario) Marcolini / Jewell	8
(Ontario) Fish / Pietrangelo	7
(Ontario) Fish / Pietrangelo	9
(Ontario) Hari / Hari	5

Second Knockout	Qualifier 7
(New Brunswick) Carter / Carr	2
(Ontario) Penston / Barbosa	6	(Ontario) Penston / Barbosa	8
(Ontario) Curley / O'Connor	5	(Ontario) Penston / Barbosa	7
(Quebec) Roy / Roy	2
(Quebec) Roy / Roy	7
(Manitoba) Buchalter / Strand	10	(Manitoba) Buchalter / Strand	5
(Ontario) Benning / Newport	2	(Ontario) Penston / Barbosa	6
(Ontario) Sharpe / Nicholls	2
(Ontario) McClelland / Rowley	4
(Ontario) Sharpe / Nicholls	5
(Ontario) Schaefer / Harwood	8
(Ontario) Sharpe / Nicholls	10

Second Knockout	Qualifier 8
(Ontario) Padoin-Lee / Del Conte	10
(Ontario) Philips / Benning	10	(Ontario) Philips / Benning	5
(Ontario) Adair / McCutcheon	3	(Ontario) Padoin-Lee / Del Conte	8
(Ontario) Fitzgerald / Sherk	6
(Ontario) Anderson / Anderson	3
(Ontario) Fitzgerald / Sherk	7	(Ontario) Fitzgerald / Sherk	7
(Manitoba) Ostrowsky / Strand	4	(Ontario) Padoin-Lee / Del Conte	5
(Ontario) Ferguson / Keon	7
(Ontario) Frlan / MacTavish	3
(Ontario) Ferguson / Keon	8
(Ontario) Ferguson / Keon	6
(Ontario) Digiglio / Miskiw	5

==== C Event ====
Third Knockout	Qualifier 9
(Ontario) Thompson / MacDougall	7
(Ontario) McClelland / Rowley	4
(Quebec) Roy / Roy	9
(Ontario) Schaefer / Harwood	7
(Ontario) Schaefer / Harwood	8
(Ontario) Benning / Newport	9	(Ontario) Benning / Newport	7
(Ontario) Curley / O'Connor	4	(Quebec) Roy / Roy	6
(Ontario) McClelland / Rowley	7
(Ontario) McClelland / Rowley	8
(Manitoba) Buchalter / Strand	1
(Manitoba) Buchalter / Strand	5
(New Brunswick) Carter / Carr	4

Third Knockout	Qualifier 10
(Alberta) (Nova Scotia) Plett / Mosher	5
(Ontario) Fitzgerald / Sherk	8
(Ontario) Fitzgerald / Sherk	9
(Manitoba) Ostrowsky / Strand	6
(Ontario) Digiglio / Miskiw	3
(Manitoba) Ostrowsky / Strand	10	(Manitoba) Ostrowsky / Strand	7
(Ontario) Adair / McCutcheon	7	(Ontario) Fitzgerald / Sherk	7
(Ontario) Frlan / MacTavish	3
(Ontario) Frlan / MacTavish	9
(Ontario) Anderson / Anderson	6
(Ontario) Anderson / Anderson	10
(Ontario) Philips / Benning	4

Third Knockout	Qualifier 11
(Ontario) Sharpe / Nicholls	4
(Ontario) Norman / Rowe	6
(Nova Scotia) Fisher / Fisher	6
(Ontario) Flanagan / Stockton	2
(Ontario) Fish / Gallacher	3
(Quebec) Bédard / Robert	6	(Ontario) Flanagan / Stockton	7
(Ontario) Flanagan / Stockton	7	(Nova Scotia) Fisher / Fisher	5
(Ontario) Norman / Rowe	8
(Ontario) Norman / Rowe	8
(Ontario) Tellier / Winters	2
(Ontario) Tellier / Winters	12
(Ontario) Hardwick / Genjaga	5	(Manitoba) Eagles / Steski	9
(Manitoba) Eagles / Steski	8

Third Knockout	Qualifier 12
(Ontario) Padoin-Lee / Del Conte	6
(Ontario) Fish / Pietrangelo	8
(Manitoba) (Nova Scotia) Evason / MacIssac	4
(Ontario) Brittain / Moretto	8
(Ontario) Hari / Hari	7
(Ontario) Brittain / Moretto	8	(Ontario) Brittain / Moretto	9
(Ontario) Symeonides / Kemp	4	(Ontario) Brittain / Moretto	6
(Ontario) Fish / Pietrangelo	8
(Ontario) Fish / Pietrangelo	8
(Ontario) Barbosa / Jewell	7
(Ontario) Barbosa / Jewell	9
(Ontario) Rath / Scriver	5

==== Playoffs ====
			East Qualifier 1
			Q1	(Quebec) Lafrance / Tremblay	8
Q5	(Quebec) Bédard / Bédard	6	Q9	(Ontario) Thompson / MacDougall	7
Q9	(Ontario) Thompson / MacDougall	8

			East Qualifier 2
			Q3	(Ontario) Ideson / Henry	11
Q7	(Ontario) Penston / Barbosa	3	Q11	(Ontario) Norman / Rowe	3
Q11	(Ontario) Norman / Rowe	5

			East Qualifier 3
			Q4	(Nova Scotia) McDonah / McCurdy	9
Q8	(Ontario) Ferguson / Keon	3	Q12	(Ontario) Fish / Pietrangelo	4
Q12	(Ontario) Fish / Pietrangelo	8

			East Qualifier 4
			Q2	(Quebec) Legault / Janidlo	5
Q6	(Ontario) Marcolini / Jewell	11	Q6	(Ontario) Marcolini / Jewell	7
Q10	(Ontario) Fitzgerald / Sherk	8

=== West – Richmond ===
November 27–30, Richmond Curling Centre, Richmond, British Columbia

==== A Event ====
First Knockout	Qualifier 1
(Alberta) Evans / Dalrymple	6
(Saskatchewan) Vogelsang / Roy	4	(Alberta) Evans / Dalrymple	7
(Alberta) Richards / Davies	9
(Alberta) Richards / Davies	5
(British Columbia) Fitzgibbon / McKenzie	9	(British Columbia) Fitzgibbon / McKenzie	2
(Alberta) Johnston / Whittmire	7	(British Columbia) Fitzgibbon / McKenzie	7
(British Columbia) Jackson / Blaeser	7	(British Columbia) Jackson / Blaeser	6
(British Columbia) Hidber / Lee	6	(Alberta) Richards / Davies	8
(British Columbia) Tabesh / Brennan	2	(Alberta) Yarmuch / Hlushak	6
(Alberta) Yarmuch / Hlushak	9	(Alberta) Yarmuch / Hlushak	8
(British Columbia) Kopytko / Beck	9	(British Columbia) Kopytko / Beck	2
(Saskatchewan) Loudon / Lussier	6	(Alberta) Yarmuch / Hlushak	5
(Alberta) Jacques / Butler	4
(Alberta) Jacques / Butler	9
(British Columbia) Fenton / Hrynew	7	(British Columbia) Fenton / Hrynew	4
(Manitoba) Magnusson / Fehr	4

First Knockout	Qualifier 2
(Alberta) Bakos / Mitsopoulos	9
(British Columbia) McLean / Lougheed	4	(Alberta) Bakos / Mitsopoulos	8
(Alberta) Yarmuch / Sawiak	7
(Alberta) Bakos / Mitsopoulos	5
(Saskatchewan) Fradette / Weiss	2	(Alberta) Yurko / Mason-Wood	6
(Alberta) Yurko / Mason-Wood	9	(Alberta) Yurko / Mason-Wood	10
(British Columbia) White / Vernon	4	(Alberta) DeSchiffart / Doepker	8
(Alberta) DeSchiffart / Doepker	12	(Alberta) Yurko / Mason-Wood	3
(Alberta) DeSchiffart / Algot	8	(Saskatchewan) Remeshylo / Derksen	9
(British Columbia) Taylor-Hunt / Jaeger	4	(Alberta) DeSchiffart / Algot	5
(British Columbia) Brown-John / Sanford	4	(Saskatchewan) Remeshylo / Derksen	6
(Saskatchewan) Remeshylo / Derksen	11	(Saskatchewan) Remeshylo / Derksen	6
(Alberta) Ryhorchuk / Peterson	5
(Alberta) Ryhorchuk / Peterson	7
(British Columbia) Bowles / Wu	5	(Saskatchewan) Simpson / Derksen	1
(Saskatchewan) Simpson / Derksen	8

==== B Event ====
Second Knockout	Qualifier 3
(Alberta) Bakos / Mitsopoulos	7
(Saskatchewan) Vogelsang / Roy	9
(British Columbia) Kopytko / Beck	2
(Saskatchewan) Vogelsang / Roy	9
(Saskatchewan) Vogelsang / Roy	4
(Alberta) Ryhorchuk / Peterson	9
(Alberta) Ryhorchuk / Peterson	7
(Alberta) Johnston / Whittmire	1
(British Columbia) Fenton / Hrynew	1
(Alberta) Johnston / Whittmire	6	(Alberta) Johnston / Whittmire	6
(British Columbia) Hidber / Lee	5	(Alberta) Ryhorchuk / Peterson	5
(Alberta) Yarmuch / Hlushak	7
(Alberta) Yarmuch / Hlushak	8
(Alberta) Evans / Dalrymple	4
(Alberta) Evans / Dalrymple	8
(Saskatchewan) Loudon / Lussier	7	(Saskatchewan) Loudon / Lussier	7
(British Columbia) Tabesh / Brennan	1	(Alberta) Evans / Dalrymple	7
(Manitoba) Magnusson / Fehr	4
(British Columbia) Jackson / Blaeser	0
(Manitoba) Magnusson / Fehr	9

Second Knockout	Qualifier 4
(British Columbia) Fitzgibbon / McKenzie	9
(Alberta) DeSchiffart / Algot	8
(British Columbia) McLean / Lougheed	4
(Alberta) DeSchiffart / Algot	7
(British Columbia) Fitzgibbon / McKenzie	2
(Alberta) Jacques / Butler	8
(Alberta) Jacques / Butler	7
(Saskatchewan) Simpson / Derksen	6
(Saskatchewan) Simpson / Derksen	8
(British Columbia) White / Vernon	3	(Saskatchewan) Fradette / Weiss	1
(Saskatchewan) Fradette / Weiss	7	(Alberta) Jacques / Butler	7
(Alberta) Yarmuch / Sawiak	8
(Alberta) Yurko / Mason-Wood	4
(Alberta) Yarmuch / Sawiak	5
(Alberta) Yarmuch / Sawiak	8
(British Columbia) Brown-John / Sanford	4	(British Columbia) Taylor-Hunt / Jaeger	4
(British Columbia) Taylor-Hunt / Jaeger	8	(Alberta) Yarmuch / Sawiak	8
(Alberta) DeSchiffart / Doepker	4
(British Columbia) Bowles / Wu	6
(Alberta) DeSchiffart / Doepker	9

==== C Event ====
Third Knockout	Qualifier 5
(Alberta) Ryhorchuk / Peterson	5
(Alberta) DeSchiffart / Algot	7
(British Columbia) Kopytko / Beck	7
(Alberta) DeSchiffart / Algot	8
(Alberta) DeSchiffart / Algot	7
(Alberta) DeSchiffart / Doepker	4
(Alberta) DeSchiffart / Doepker	13
(British Columbia) White / Vernon	10	(British Columbia) White / Vernon	4
(British Columbia) Brown-John / Sanford	2

Third Knockout	Qualifier 6
(Alberta) Evans / Dalrymple	11
(British Columbia) Bowles / Wu	7	(British Columbia) Bowles / Wu	3
(British Columbia) Taylor-Hunt / Jaeger	6	(Alberta) Evans / Dalrymple	7
(Saskatchewan) Vogelsang / Roy	6
(Saskatchewan) Vogelsang / Roy	12
(Saskatchewan) Simpson / Derksen	7	(Saskatchewan) Simpson / Derksen	5
(British Columbia) Fenton / Hrynew	5

Third Knockout	Qualifier 7
(Alberta) Yurko / Mason-Wood	9
(Alberta) Johnston / Whittmire	9	(Alberta) Johnston / Whittmire	5
(British Columbia) McLean / Lougheed	1	(Alberta) Yurko / Mason-Wood	5
(Saskatchewan) Loudon / Lussier	4
(British Columbia) Fitzgibbon / McKenzie	6
(British Columbia) Jackson / Blaeser	6	(Saskatchewan) Loudon / Lussier	7
(Saskatchewan) Loudon / Lussier	7

Third Knockout	Qualifier 8
(Manitoba) Magnusson / Fehr	6
(British Columbia) Hidber / Lee	9	(British Columbia) Hidber / Lee	4
(British Columbia) Tabesh / Brennan	6	(Manitoba) Magnusson / Fehr	6
(Alberta) Bakos / Mitsopoulos	1
(Alberta) Bakos / Mitsopoulos	6
(Saskatchewan) Fradette / Weiss	5
(Manitoba) Magnusson / Fehr	10
(Alberta) Jacques / Butler	2

==== Playoffs ====
West Qualifier 1
Q1	(Alberta) Richards / Davies	9
Q7	(Alberta) Yurko / Mason-Wood	3

West Qualifier 2
Q2	(Saskatchewan) Remeshylo / Derksen	4
Q6	(Alberta) Evans / Dalrymple	7

West Qualifier 3
Q4	(Alberta) Yarmuch / Sawiak	8
Q5	(Alberta) DeSchiffart / Algot	2

West Qualifier 3
Q3	(Alberta) Yarmuch / Hlushak	8
Q8	(Manitoba) Magnusson / Fehr	5
