= Detroit Curling Club =

Curling club in Michigan, US

- Location: 1615 E Lewiston Ave; Ferndale, Michigan 48220

Information
- Established: 1885
- Club type: Dedicated ice
- USCA region: Great Lakes Curling Association
- Sheets of ice: Four
- Website: www.detroitcurlingclub.com

The Detroit Curling Club is an organization that promotes the sport of curling in the Detroit area. Its home is a four-sheet facility located in Ferndale, Michigan. It is one of the oldest curling clubs in the United States, founded in 1840. It is the oldest in Michigan, and the present-day club was founded in 1885 following the merger of several organizations.

== Origins and history ==
The Detroit Curling Club was founded by local farmers and was one of several organizations that had been formed in the Detroit area post-civil war. These groups largely contested their games on a frozen Orchard Lake - in recent years, divers have found curling rocks from these games at the lake's bottom.

The club first moved to an outside facility next to the Detroit Athletic Club and built its first indoor facility in 1906 at 1236 Forest Avenue in Detroit. In 1979, the facility was bought out by an expanding Wayne State University, and the club moved to a new home in West Bloomfield, Michigan. Hard times fell on the club in the mid-1990s when small membership numbers and high taxes threatened the life of the club. For a few years, the club looked for a new, dedicated facility that would suit the club for years to come. An arrangement was drawn up with the city of Ferndale, the club purchased land in Martin Road Park, then donated the land back to the city, and leased the property for 99 years. This allowed the club to build a new rink with curling in mind.

The current facility opened in January 2002. With network coverage of curling during the 2002 and 2006 Winter Olympics, membership soared and in February 2006, a single day open house drew a crowd of 500 first-time curlers. The facility also doubles as a community center in the summer time when the club does not curl as it is too difficult to maintain the ice during the summer heat.

The club is a founding member of the Ontario Curling Association despite being in a different country. Members are allowed to play in provincial championships in Ontario. Detroit's curling ties to Canada date back to 1917 when they first played against teams from Kitchener and Waterloo, Ontario.
