= Mopac =

Mopac, MOPAC or MoPac may refer to:

- Missouri Pacific Railroad
- Mopac Expressway, State Highway Loop 1 in Austin, Texas, U.S.
- MOPAC, a computational chemistry program
- Mayor's Office for Policing and Crime, a group which oversees the Metropolitan Police in London, U.K.
- Mountain Pacific Curling Association, a regional curling association in the Western United States
