= Dakota Curling Club =

Curling club in Lakeville, Minnesota

Dakota Curling
- Location: 20775 Holt Ave. Lakeville, Minnesota 55044

Information
- Established: 2006
- Club type: Club Ice
- USCA region: Minnesota
- Sheets of ice: Six
- Rock colors: Red and Yellow
- Website: http://dakotacurlingclub.org

Dakota Curling Club is a curling club located in a former grocery store in Lakeville, Minnesota, a suburb of Minneapolis–Saint Paul. Previously it was an arena club based out of the Burnsville Ice Center. Dakota Curling members participate in many regional, national, and international competitions each year. The organization currently has 600+ members.

== History ==
Dakota Curling Club was founded in February 2006 in response to the growing demand for curling in the Twin Cities metropolitan area. In 2013 the club won the Women's Arena Club Curling Championships in Ft. Wayne, Indiana.

In 2018 the club hosted the United States Mixed Curling Championship, the national championship for mixed teams consisting of two men and two women.
