= Great Lakes Curling Association =

- Sport: Curling
- Jurisdiction: Regional
- Membership: 19 curling clubs
- Abbreviation: GLCA
- Affiliation: United States Curling Association

Official website
- www.greatlakescurling.org
- (United States)

The Great Lakes Curling Association is a regional association of the United States Curling Association encompassing the states of Michigan, Ohio, Indiana, and Kentucky.

== Member Clubs ==
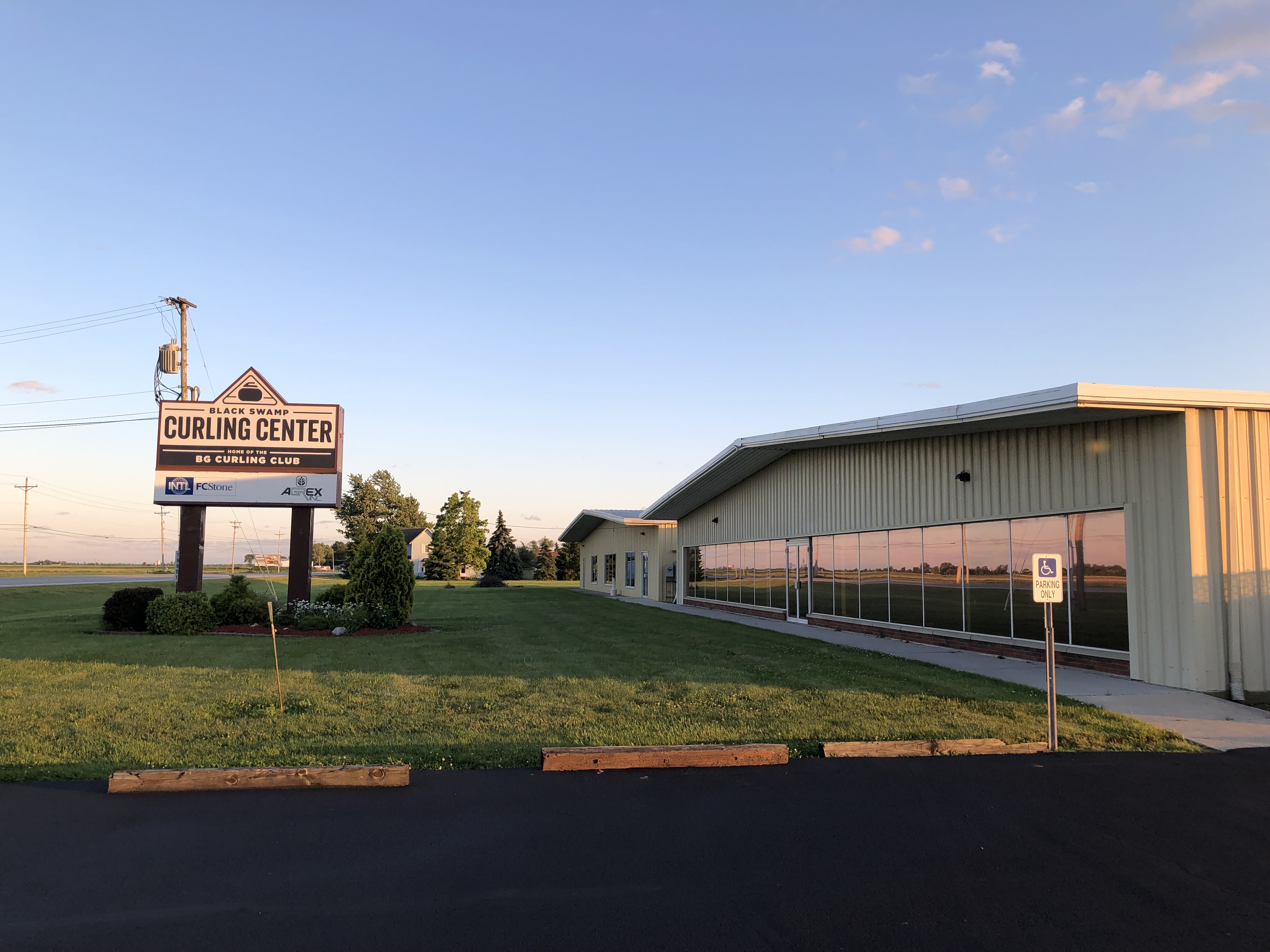
The Black Swamp Curling Center in Ohio

| State | Club Name | City | Type | Year Founded | Sheets |
|---|---|---|---|---|---|
| Indiana | Circle City Curling Club | Indianapolis | Arena | 2007 | 3 |
| Indiana | Fort Wayne Curling Club | Fort Wayne | Dedicated | 2010 | 4 |
| Michigan | Copper Country Curling Club | Calumet | Dedicated | 1993 | 2 |
| Michigan | Delta Rocks Curling Club | Escanaba | Arena | | |
| Michigan | Detroit Curling Club | Ferndale | Dedicated | 1885 | 4 |
| Michigan | Grand Rapids Curling Club | Grand Rapids | Arena | 2020 | |
| Michigan | Kalamazoo Curling Club | Kalamazoo | Dedicated | 2008 | |
| Michigan | Lansing Curling Club | Lansing | Arena | 2010 | |
| Michigan | Lewiston Curling Club | Lewiston | Dedicated | 1960 | 2 |
| Michigan | Ludington Area Curling Club | Ludington | Arena | 2025 | |
| Michigan | Midland Curling Club | Midland | Dedicated | 1962 | 4 |
| Michigan | Petoskey Curling Club | Petoskey | Dedicated | 2014 | 1 |
| Michigan | Traverse City Curling Club | Traverse City | Arena | 2014 | 5 |
| Ohio | Bowling Green Curling Club | Bowling Green | Dedicated | 1968 | 4 |
| Ohio | Cincinnati Curling Club | Cincinnati | Arena | 2008 | 4 |
| Ohio | Cleveland Skating Club | Shaker Heights | Arena | | 5 |
| Ohio | Columbus Curling Club | Columbus | Dedicated | 2004 | 4 |
| Ohio | Mayfield Curling Club | South Euclid | Dedicated | 1962 | 4 |
| Kentucky | Derby City Curling Club | Louisville | Arena | 2018 | |
