= 2026 Canadian Junior Curling Championships =

2026 New Holland Canadian Under-20 Curling Championships
- Host city: Sudbury, Ontario
- Arena: Gerry McCrory Countryside Sports Complex
- Dates: March 28 – April 4
- Men's winner: Ontario 1
- Curling club: Fergus CC, Fergus
- Skip: Evan MacDougall
- Third: Dylan Stockton
- Second: Evan Madore
- Lead: Carson Kay
- Alternate: Ryne Fisher
- Coach: Jordan Thin
- Finalist: Alberta 1 (Hlushak)
- Women's winner: Quebec 2
- Curling club: CC Kénogami, Jonquière
- Skip: Jolianne Fortin
- Third: Emy Lafrance
- Second: Megan Lafrance
- Lead: Mégane Fortin
- Coach: Brandon Lafrance
- Finalist: Manitoba (Hayward)

The 2026 New Holland Canadian Under-20 Curling Championships was held from March 28 to April 4 at the Gerry McCrory Countryside Sports Complex in Sudbury, Ontario. The winners (Ontario's Evan MacDougall and Quebec's Jolianne Fortin) earned the right to represent Canada at the 2027 World Junior Curling Championships. The event was also held in conjunction with the 2026 Canadian Under-21 Mixed Doubles Championship.

The event featured eighteen teams on both the men's and women's sides, each split into two pools of nine. The top three teams from each pool at the end of the round robin advanced to the playoff round. Due to withdraws from the Northwest Territories and Nunavut on the men's side and Nunavut and Yukon on the women's side, as well as results from the 2024 and 2025 events, certain provinces earned two berths to the championship. Alberta, Nova Scotia, Ontario, Manitoba, Saskatchewan, and Manitoba each earned an extra berth on the men's side, while Quebec, Nova Scotia, Ontario, Alberta, and British Columbia got two berths on the women's side. As the host province, Northern Ontario also earned two berths in each event.

== Medallists ==
Event	Gold	Silver	Bronze
Men	Ontario 1 Evan MacDougall; Dylan Stockton; Evan Madore; Carson Kay; Ryne Fisher	Alberta 1 Peter Hlushak; Sahil Dalrymple; Lucas Sawiak; Varyk Doepker	Quebec; Raphaël Tremblay; Louis-François Brassard; Pierre-Olivier Roy; Mathis Arsenault; Thomas Corbeil
Women	Quebec 2 Jolianne Fortin; Emy Lafrance; Megan Lafrance; Mégane Fortin	Manitoba; Shaela Hayward; India Young; Keira Krahn; Dayna Wahl	Nova Scotia 1 Cassidy Blades; Stephanie Atherton; Anna MacNutt; Lily Mitchell

== Men ==
=== Teams ===
The teams are listed as follows:

Province / Territory	Skip	Third	Second	Lead	Alternate	Club(s)
Alberta 1	Peter Hlushak	Sahil Dalrymple	Lucas Sawiak	Varyk Doepker		Saville Community SC, Edmonton
Alberta 2	Jaxon Hiebert	Noah Mason-Wood	Nate Burton	Braeden Hein		Sherwood Park CC, Sherwood Park; Saville Community SC, Edmonton
British Columbia	Harrison Hrynew	Wesley Wu	Taj McKenzie	Miles Reed		Royal City CC, New Westminster
Manitoba 1	Evan Boutet	Luc Cormier	Bryce Buchel	Quinn Lagacé	Nick Senff	Heather CC, Winnipeg
Manitoba 2	Nash Sugden	Tyler Fehr	Tanner Treichel	Ryan Thiessen		Morden CC, Morden
New Brunswick	Austen Matheson	Ron-Allen Elsinga	Dakari Rousselle	James Watson	Cameron Sallaj	Woodstock CC, Woodstock
Newfoundland and Labrador	Simon Perry	Nicholas Codner	Brayden Snow	Carter Holden		St. John's CC, St. John's
Northern Ontario 1	Riley Winters	Wesley Decary	Grayson Gribbon	Aidan Baxter		North Bay GC, North Bay
Northern Ontario 2	Jacob Curtis	Warren Stroud	Owen Weiss	Kain Cristofaro		Port Arthur CC, Thunder Bay
Nova Scotia 1	Zach Atherton	Alan Fawcett	Tyler McMullen	Jed Freeman		Halifax CC, Halifax
Nova Scotia 2	Elex Lockhart	Marcus Hannam	Colin O'Neil	Sam Crouse		Berwick CC, Berwick
Ontario 1	Evan MacDougall	Dylan Stockton	Evan Madore	Carson Kay	Ryne Fisher	Fergus CC, Fergus
Ontario 2	Tyler MacTavish	Owen Nicholls	Nathan Kim	Nate Thomas	Owen MacTavish	KW Granite Club, Waterloo
Prince Edward Island	Connor Bruce	Connor MacEwen	Luke Butler	Nate MacRae		Cornwall CC, Cornwall
Quebec	Raphaël Tremblay	Louis-François Brassard	Pierre-Olivier Roy	Mathis Arsenault	Thomas Corbeil	CC Grand-Mère, Shawinigan; CC Kénogami, Jonquière; CC des Collines, Chelsea
Saskatchewan 1	Rogan Snow	Nathan Roy	Dominic Barlow	Cole Hilderman		Sutherland CC, Saskatoon
Saskatchewan 2	Ethan Robinson	Nathan Weiss	Lewis MacDiarmid	Joshua Kirilenko		Nutana CC, Saskatoon
Yukon	Nolan Floyd	Fisher Miller	Carter Hinds	Darwin Murray	Jase Floyd	Whitehorse CC, Whitehorse

=== Round robin standings ===
Final Round Robin Standings

Key
Teams to Playoffs

Pool A	Skip	W	L	W–L	DSC
Alberta 2	Jaxon Hiebert	7	1	1–0	30.68
Ontario 2	Tyler MacTavish	7	1	0–1	43.31
British Columbia	Harrison Hrynew	5	3	–	62.29
Northern Ontario 1	Riley Winters	4	4	1–0	28.77
Nova Scotia 1	Zach Atherton	4	4	0–1	34.32
New Brunswick	Austen Matheson	3	5	1–0	26.95
Manitoba 1	Evan Boutet	3	5	0–1	48.39
Saskatchewan 2	Ethan Robinson	2	6	–	59.32
Yukon	Nolan Floyd	1	7	–	85.43

Pool B	Skip	W	L	W–L	DSC
Ontario 1	Evan MacDougall	7	1	–	63.64
Alberta 1	Peter Hlushak	6	2	2–0	26.24
Quebec	Raphaël Tremblay	6	2	1–1	37.89
Newfoundland and Labrador	Simon Perry	6	2	0–2	39.51
Saskatchewan 1	Rogan Snow	5	3	–	51.41
Manitoba 2	Nash Sugden	3	5	–	56.19
Nova Scotia 2	Elex Lockhart	2	6	–	42.52
Northern Ontario 2	Jacob Curtis	1	7	–	53.44
Prince Edward Island	Connor Bruce	0	8	–	64.45

Pool A Round Robin Summary Table
Pos.	Team	(Alberta) AB2	(British Columbia) BC	(Manitoba) MB1	(New Brunswick) NB	(Northern Ontario) NO1	(Nova Scotia) NS1	(Ontario) ON2	(Saskatchewan) SK2	(Yukon) YT	Record
1	Alberta 2	—	7–3	7–5	6–5	4–2	3–6	5–4	12–2	9–2	7–1
3	British Columbia	3–7	—	9–1	8–6	6–4	6–5	4–8	3–4	13–3	5–3
7	Manitoba 1	5–7	1–9	—	4–6	5–9	6–4	5–8	7–5	9–1	3–5
6	New Brunswick	5–6	6–8	6–4	—	4–3	5–8	6–8	6–5	5–8	3–5
4	Northern Ontario 1	2–4	4–6	9–5	3–4	—	7–6	4–8	7–1	6–4	4–4
5	Nova Scotia 1	6–3	5–6	4–6	8–5	6–7	—	5–7	6–5	9–4	4–4
2	Ontario 2	4–5	8–4	8–5	8–6	8–4	7–5	—	8–4	5–2	7–1
8	Saskatchewan 2	2–12	4–3	5–7	5–6	1–7	5–6	4–8	—	10–2	2–6
9	Yukon	2–9	3–13	1–9	8–5	4–6	4–9	2–5	2–10	—	1–7

Pool B Round Robin Summary Table
Pos.	Team	(Alberta) AB1	(Manitoba) MB2	(Newfoundland and Labrador) NL	(Northern Ontario) NO2	(Nova Scotia) NS2	(Ontario) ON1	(Prince Edward Island) PE	(Quebec) QC	(Saskatchewan) SK1	Record
2	Alberta 1	—	7–2	7–3	8–1	5–4	6–8	4–3	6–5	5–6	6–2
6	Manitoba 2	2–7	—	4–8	8–5	9–8	1–8	8–2	5–6	5–8	3–5
4	Newfoundland and Labrador	3–7	8–4	—	8–2	7–3	4–3	6–2	2–6	13–4	6–2
8	Northern Ontario 2	1–8	5–8	2–8	—	2–3	2–10	7–5	4–10	4–5	1–7
7	Nova Scotia 2	4–5	8–9	3–7	3–2	—	3–6	7–0	3–9	5–6	2–6
1	Ontario 1	8–6	8–1	3–4	10–2	6–3	—	6–4	6–4	7–6	7–1
9	Prince Edward Island	3–4	2–8	2–6	5–7	0–7	4–6	—	2–6	3–8	0–8
3	Quebec	5–6	6–5	6–2	10–4	9–3	4–6	6–2	—	8–4	6–2
5	Saskatchewan 1	6–5	8–5	4–13	5–4	6–5	6–7	8–3	4–8	—	5–3

=== Round robin results ===
All draw times are listed in Eastern Time (UTC−04:00).

==== Draw 1 ====
Saturday, March 28, 4:00 pm

Sheet A	1	2	3	4	5	6	7	8	Final
Alberta 1 (Hlushak) 🔨	0	0	1	1	0	4	0	0	6
Ontario 1 (MacDougall)	0	1	0	0	3	0	2	2	8

Sheet B	1	2	3	4	5	6	7	8	Final
Saskatchewan 1 (Snow)	0	1	0	1	0	2	0	X	4
Newfoundland and Labrador (Perry) 🔨	2	0	2	0	6	0	3	X	13

Sheet C	1	2	3	4	5	6	7	8	Final
Prince Edward Island (Bruce) 🔨	0	0	1	0	0	1	0	X	2
Quebec (Tremblay)	1	1	0	2	0	0	2	X	6

Sheet D	1	2	3	4	5	6	7	8	Final
Nova Scotia 2 (Lockhart) 🔨	0	1	0	0	1	3	3	0	8
Manitoba 2 (Sugden)	0	0	2	4	0	0	0	3	9

Sheet E	1	2	3	4	5	6	7	8	9	10	Final
Manitoba 1 (Boutet)	0	2	0	1	0	1	0	0	0	2	6
Nova Scotia 1 (Atherton) 🔨	1	0	1	0	1	0	0	1	0	0	4

Sheet F	1	2	3	4	5	6	7	8	Final
New Brunswick (Matheson) 🔨	1	0	0	0	0	1	1	1	4
Northern Ontario 1 (Winters)	0	0	0	1	2	0	0	0	3

Sheet G	1	2	3	4	5	6	7	8	Final
British Columbia (Hrynew) 🔨	2	0	2	0	3	0	6	X	13
Yukon (Floyd)	0	1	0	1	0	1	0	X	3

Sheet H	1	2	3	4	5	6	7	8	Final
Alberta 2 (Hiebert) 🔨	2	0	0	1	0	0	0	2	5
Ontario 2 (MacTavish)	0	1	0	0	1	2	0	0	4

==== Draw 3 ====
Sunday, March 29, 10:00 am

Sheet A	1	2	3	4	5	6	7	8	Final
Nova Scotia 2 (Lockhart)	0	2	1	1	0	0	1	0	5
Saskatchewan 1 (Snow) 🔨	1	0	0	0	2	1	0	2	6

Sheet B	1	2	3	4	5	6	7	8	Final
Northern Ontario 2 (Curtis) 🔨	0	1	0	4	0	2	0	X	7
Prince Edward Island (Bruce)	0	0	2	0	2	0	1	X	5

Sheet C	1	2	3	4	5	6	7	8	Final
Manitoba 2 (Sugden)	0	0	1	0	0	0	0	X	1
Ontario 1 (MacDougall) 🔨	1	0	0	2	0	4	1	X	8

Sheet D	1	2	3	4	5	6	7	8	Final
Newfoundland and Labrador (Perry)	0	0	1	0	1	0	0	0	2
Quebec (Tremblay) 🔨	0	2	0	1	0	1	1	1	6

Sheet E	1	2	3	4	5	6	7	8	Final
New Brunswick (Matheson) 🔨	2	0	0	0	2	0	1	0	5
Alberta 2 (Hiebert)	0	1	2	2	0	0	0	1	6

Sheet F	1	2	3	4	5	6	7	8	Final
Saskatchewan 2 (Robinson) 🔨	0	0	1	0	0	2	0	1	4
British Columbia (Hrynew)	0	1	0	1	1	0	0	0	3

Sheet G	1	2	3	4	5	6	7	8	Final
Ontario 2 (MacTavish) 🔨	2	0	3	2	0	0	1	0	8
Manitoba 1 (Boutet)	0	2	0	0	0	2	0	1	5

Sheet H	1	2	3	4	5	6	7	8	Final
Northern Ontario 1 (Winters) 🔨	0	1	0	2	2	0	1	0	6
Yukon (Floyd)	0	0	0	0	0	0	0	4	4

==== Draw 5 ====
Sunday, March 29, 6:00 pm

Sheet A	1	2	3	4	5	6	7	8	Final
Northern Ontario 1 (Winters) 🔨	2	0	0	1	0	0	1	X	4
Ontario 2 (MacTavish)	0	4	1	0	1	2	0	X	8

Sheet B	1	2	3	4	5	6	7	8	Final
Alberta 2 (Hiebert) 🔨	1	0	0	0	2	0	0	X	3
Nova Scotia 1 (Atherton)	0	2	1	0	0	1	2	X	6

Sheet C	1	2	3	4	5	6	7	8	9	Final
Saskatchewan 2 (Robinson) 🔨	0	0	1	0	0	0	3	1	0	5
New Brunswick (Matheson)	1	0	0	1	0	3	0	0	1	6

Sheet D	1	2	3	4	5	6	7	8	Final
Manitoba 1 (Boutet) 🔨	1	0	0	0	0	0	X	X	1
British Columbia (Hrynew)	0	1	3	2	1	2	X	X	9

Sheet E	1	2	3	4	5	6	7	8	Final
Newfoundland and Labrador (Perry) 🔨	2	0	1	0	1	0	4	X	8
Manitoba 2 (Sugden)	0	1	0	1	0	2	0	X	4

Sheet F	1	2	3	4	5	6	7	8	Final
Nova Scotia 2 (Lockhart) 🔨	0	0	2	0	1	1	0	X	4
Alberta 1 (Hlushak)	2	1	0	2	0	0	0	X	5

Sheet G	1	2	3	4	5	6	7	8	Final
Northern Ontario 2 (Curtis) 🔨	1	0	2	0	0	0	0	1	4
Saskatchewan 1 (Snow)	0	1	0	2	0	1	1	0	5

Sheet H	1	2	3	4	5	6	7	8	Final
Ontario 1 (MacDougall) 🔨	0	0	1	1	0	3	1	X	6
Prince Edward Island (Bruce)	0	2	0	0	2	0	0	X	4

==== Draw 7 ====
Monday, March 30, 2:00 pm

Sheet A	1	2	3	4	5	6	7	8	Final
Manitoba 1 (Boutet) 🔨	1	1	0	3	2	0	0	X	7
Saskatchewan 2 (Robinson)	0	0	3	0	0	1	1	X	5

Sheet B	1	2	3	4	5	6	7	8	Final
Ontario 2 (MacTavish) 🔨	2	1	0	2	0	0	0	X	5
Yukon (Floyd)	0	0	1	0	0	0	1	X	2

Sheet C	1	2	3	4	5	6	7	8	Final
Alberta 2 (Hiebert) 🔨	0	0	2	0	0	0	0	2	4
Northern Ontario 1 (Winters)	0	0	0	1	0	1	0	0	2

Sheet D	1	2	3	4	5	6	7	8	Final
New Brunswick (Matheson)	1	0	2	0	1	0	1	X	5
Nova Scotia 1 (Atherton) 🔨	0	4	0	1	0	3	0	X	8

Sheet E	1	2	3	4	5	6	7	8	Final
Ontario 1 (MacDougall) 🔨	0	4	0	0	2	1	3	X	10
Northern Ontario 2 (Curtis)	0	0	2	0	0	0	0	X	2

Sheet F	1	2	3	4	5	6	7	8	9	Final
Manitoba 2 (Sugden)	0	0	2	0	0	1	2	0	0	5
Quebec (Tremblay) 🔨	3	0	0	1	0	0	0	1	1	6

Sheet G	1	2	3	4	5	6	7	8	Final
Nova Scotia 2 (Lockhart)	0	0	0	0	2	0	1	X	3
Newfoundland and Labrador (Perry) 🔨	0	3	0	2	0	2	0	X	7

Sheet H	1	2	3	4	5	6	7	8	Final
Saskatchewan 1 (Snow) 🔨	2	0	0	2	0	0	0	2	6
Alberta 1 (Hlushak)	0	2	0	0	2	1	0	0	5

==== Draw 9 ====
Tuesday, March 31, 10:00 am

Sheet A	1	2	3	4	5	6	7	8	Final
Saskatchewan 1 (Snow)	0	0	1	0	1	0	2	X	4
Quebec (Tremblay) 🔨	2	2	0	2	0	2	0	X	8

Sheet B	1	2	3	4	5	6	7	8	Final
Newfoundland and Labrador (Perry) 🔨	1	0	0	0	0	2	0	1	4
Ontario 1 (MacDougall)	0	2	0	0	0	0	1	0	3

Sheet C	1	2	3	4	5	6	7	8	Final
Alberta 1 (Hlushak)	1	1	0	0	2	0	0	0	4
Prince Edward Island (Bruce) 🔨	0	0	1	0	0	0	2	0	3

Sheet D	1	2	3	4	5	6	7	8	9	Final
Northern Ontario 2 (Curtis) 🔨	0	1	0	0	0	1	0	0	0	2
Nova Scotia 2 (Lockhart)	0	0	0	1	0	0	0	1	1	3

Sheet E	1	2	3	4	5	6	7	8	Final
Yukon (Floyd)	0	0	2	0	2	1	0	3	8
New Brunswick (Matheson) 🔨	1	1	0	1	0	0	2	0	5

Sheet F	1	2	3	4	5	6	7	8	Final
Northern Ontario 1 (Winters) 🔨	2	0	0	0	2	0	2	3	9
Manitoba 1 (Boutet)	0	1	1	0	0	3	0	0	5

Sheet G	1	2	3	4	5	6	7	8	9	Final
Nova Scotia 1 (Atherton) 🔨	0	2	1	0	0	1	0	1	0	5
British Columbia (Hrynew)	1	0	0	0	2	0	2	0	1	6

Sheet H	1	2	3	4	5	6	7	8	Final
Saskatchewan 2 (Robinson)	0	0	2	0	0	0	X	X	2
Alberta 2 (Hiebert) 🔨	2	0	0	4	3	3	X	X	12

==== Draw 11 ====
Tuesday, March 31, 6:00 pm

Sheet A	1	2	3	4	5	6	7	8	Final
Prince Edward Island (Bruce)	0	1	0	1	0	0	0	X	2
Newfoundland and Labrador (Perry) 🔨	1	0	0	0	2	1	2	X	6

Sheet B	1	2	3	4	5	6	7	8	Final
Alberta 1 (Hlushak) 🔨	3	0	1	1	0	3	X	X	8
Northern Ontario 2 (Curtis)	0	0	0	0	1	0	X	X	1

Sheet C	1	2	3	4	5	6	7	8	Final
Saskatchewan 1 (Snow)	0	2	1	0	3	0	2	X	8
Manitoba 2 (Sugden) 🔨	2	0	0	2	0	1	0	X	5

Sheet D	1	2	3	4	5	6	7	8	Final
Quebec (Tremblay)	1	0	0	1	0	2	0	X	4
Ontario 1 (MacDougall) 🔨	0	2	2	0	1	0	1	X	6

Sheet E	1	2	3	4	5	6	7	8	Final
British Columbia (Hrynew)	0	0	1	0	0	2	2	1	6
Northern Ontario 1 (Winters) 🔨	0	1	0	2	1	0	0	0	4

Sheet F	1	2	3	4	5	6	7	8	Final
Nova Scotia 1 (Atherton) 🔨	0	1	1	1	0	0	0	3	6
Saskatchewan 2 (Robinson)	4	0	0	0	1	0	0	0	5

Sheet G	1	2	3	4	5	6	7	8	9	Final
New Brunswick (Matheson) 🔨	0	2	1	0	0	1	0	2	0	6
Ontario 2 (MacTavish)	2	0	0	2	0	0	2	0	2	8

Sheet H	1	2	3	4	5	6	7	8	Final
Yukon (Floyd) 🔨	0	0	1	0	0	0	0	X	1
Manitoba 1 (Boutet)	1	1	0	1	1	2	3	X	9

==== Draw 13 ====
Wednesday, April 1, 2:00 pm

Sheet A	1	2	3	4	5	6	7	8	9	Final
Ontario 2 (MacTavish)	0	0	2	2	0	1	0	0	2	7
Nova Scotia 1 (Atherton) 🔨	1	1	0	0	0	0	2	1	0	5

Sheet B	1	2	3	4	5	6	7	8	Final
Yukon (Floyd)	0	1	0	1	0	0	0	X	2
Alberta 2 (Hiebert) 🔨	2	0	2	0	0	0	5	X	9

Sheet C	1	2	3	4	5	6	7	8	Final
Northern Ontario 1 (Winters) 🔨	0	1	1	1	0	3	1	X	7
Saskatchewan 2 (Robinson)	0	0	0	0	1	0	0	X	1

Sheet D	1	2	3	4	5	6	7	8	Final
British Columbia (Hrynew) 🔨	0	0	2	2	0	3	0	1	8
New Brunswick (Matheson)	1	2	0	0	1	0	2	0	6

Sheet E	1	2	3	4	5	6	7	8	Final
Manitoba 2 (Sugden)	1	0	0	0	1	0	0	X	2
Alberta 1 (Hlushak) 🔨	0	3	0	0	0	2	2	X	7

Sheet F	1	2	3	4	5	6	7	8	Final
Quebec (Tremblay)	1	3	0	3	1	0	1	X	9
Nova Scotia 2 (Lockhart) 🔨	0	0	1	0	0	2	0	X	3

Sheet G	1	2	3	4	5	6	7	8	Final
Newfoundland and Labrador (Perry) 🔨	3	2	0	0	3	0	X	X	8
Northern Ontario 2 (Curtis)	0	0	0	0	0	2	X	X	2

Sheet H	1	2	3	4	5	6	7	8	Final
Prince Edward Island (Bruce) 🔨	1	0	1	1	0	0	0	X	3
Saskatchewan 1 (Snow)	0	3	0	0	0	2	3	X	8

==== Draw 15 ====
Thursday, April 2, 10:00 am

Sheet A	1	2	3	4	5	6	7	8	Final
Quebec (Tremblay) 🔨	2	0	4	0	1	0	3	X	10
Northern Ontario 2 (Curtis)	0	1	0	2	0	1	0	X	4

Sheet B	1	2	3	4	5	6	7	8	Final
Prince Edward Island (Bruce) 🔨	1	0	0	1	0	0	0	X	2
Manitoba 2 (Sugden)	0	1	1	0	2	3	1	X	8

Sheet C	1	2	3	4	5	6	7	8	Final
Ontario 1 (MacDougall)	0	1	0	1	0	2	0	2	6
Nova Scotia 2 (Lockhart) 🔨	0	0	1	0	2	0	0	0	3

Sheet D	1	2	3	4	5	6	7	8	Final
Alberta 1 (Hlushak) 🔨	1	0	1	0	2	0	3	X	7
Newfoundland and Labrador (Perry)	0	1	0	1	0	1	0	X	3

Sheet E	1	2	3	4	5	6	7	8	Final
Saskatchewan 2 (Robinson)	1	2	1	4	0	2	X	X	10
Yukon (Floyd) 🔨	0	0	0	0	2	0	X	X	2

Sheet F	1	2	3	4	5	6	7	8	Final
British Columbia (Hrynew)	1	0	0	2	0	1	0	X	4
Ontario 2 (MacTavish) 🔨	0	2	1	0	3	0	2	X	8

Sheet G	1	2	3	4	5	6	7	8	Final
Manitoba 1 (Boutet) 🔨	1	0	0	2	0	2	0	X	5
Alberta 2 (Hiebert)	0	2	1	0	2	0	2	X	7

Sheet H	1	2	3	4	5	6	7	8	Final
Nova Scotia 1 (Atherton)	0	0	2	1	0	3	0	0	6
Northern Ontario 1 (Winters) 🔨	1	1	0	0	3	0	1	1	7

==== Draw 17 ====
Thursday, April 2, 6:00 pm

Sheet A	1	2	3	4	5	6	7	8	Final
Alberta 2 (Hiebert) 🔨	0	2	0	4	0	0	1	X	7
British Columbia (Hrynew)	0	0	1	0	1	1	0	X	3

Sheet B	1	2	3	4	5	6	7	8	Final
New Brunswick (Matheson) 🔨	2	0	0	1	0	1	1	1	6
Manitoba 1 (Boutet)	0	1	1	0	2	0	0	0	4

Sheet C	1	2	3	4	5	6	7	8	Final
Nova Scotia 1 (Atherton) 🔨	3	0	3	0	1	1	0	1	9
Yukon (Floyd)	0	1	0	2	0	0	1	0	4

Sheet D	1	2	3	4	5	6	7	8	Final
Ontario 2 (MacTavish)	0	4	0	0	0	2	0	2	8
Saskatchewan 2 (Robinson) 🔨	1	0	0	1	0	0	2	0	4

Sheet E	1	2	3	4	5	6	7	8	Final
Nova Scotia 2 (Lockhart) 🔨	2	1	2	2	0	0	X	X	7
Prince Edward Island (Bruce)	0	0	0	0	0	0	X	X	0

Sheet F	1	2	3	4	5	6	7	8	9	Final
Ontario 1 (MacDougall) 🔨	0	2	0	1	0	2	1	0	1	7
Saskatchewan 1 (Snow)	1	0	3	0	1	0	0	1	0	6

Sheet G	1	2	3	4	5	6	7	8	9	Final
Quebec (Tremblay) 🔨	1	1	0	1	0	1	0	1	0	5
Alberta 1 (Hlushak)	0	0	3	0	1	0	1	0	1	6

Sheet H	1	2	3	4	5	6	7	8	Final
Manitoba 2 (Sugden) 🔨	0	2	2	0	0	1	1	2	8
Northern Ontario 2 (Curtis)	0	0	0	2	3	0	0	0	5

=== Playoffs ===
Quarterfinals
B2	Alberta 1	5
A3	British Columbia	3
A2	Ontario 2	2
B3	Quebec	10

Semifinals
A1	Alberta 2	2
B2	Alberta 1	7
B1	Ontario 1	5
B3	Quebec	4

Final
B2	Alberta 1	3
B1	Ontario 1	8
Bronze medal game
A1	Alberta 2	3
B3	Quebec	4

==== Quarterfinals ====
Friday, April 3, 2:00 pm

Sheet B	1	2	3	4	5	6	7	8	Final
Ontario 2 (MacTavish)	0	0	2	0	0	0	X	X	2
Quebec (Tremblay) 🔨	2	2	0	4	1	1	X	X	10

Sheet C	1	2	3	4	5	6	7	8	Final
Alberta 1 (Hlushak) 🔨	2	1	0	0	1	1	0	X	5
British Columbia (Hrynew)	0	0	0	3	0	0	0	X	3

==== Semifinals ====
Friday, April 3, 6:00 pm

Sheet B	1	2	3	4	5	6	7	8	9	Final
Ontario 1 (MacDougall) 🔨	0	0	0	1	0	2	0	1	1	5
Quebec (Tremblay)	0	0	0	0	3	0	1	0	0	4

Sheet D	1	2	3	4	5	6	7	8	Final
Alberta 2 (Hiebert)	0	0	0	0	2	0	0	X	2
Alberta 1 (Hlushak) 🔨	1	2	0	2	0	1	1	X	7

==== Bronze medal game ====
Saturday, April 4, 11:00 am

Sheet B	1	2	3	4	5	6	7	8	Final
Alberta 2 (Hiebert)	0	2	0	0	0	1	0	0	3
Quebec (Tremblay) 🔨	1	0	0	0	0	0	2	1	4

==== Final ====
Saturday, April 4, 11:00 am

Sheet C	1	2	3	4	5	6	7	8	Final
Alberta 1 (Hlushak)	0	0	1	0	2	0	0	X	3
Ontario 1 (MacDougall) 🔨	0	4	0	1	0	2	1	X	8

=== Final standings ===
Place	Team
1st place, gold medalist(s)	Ontario 1
2nd place, silver medalist(s)	Alberta 1
3rd place, bronze medalist(s)	Quebec
4	Alberta 2
5	Ontario 2
6	British Columbia
7	Northern Ontario 1
8	Newfoundland and Labrador
9	Nova Scotia 1
10	Saskatchewan 1
11	New Brunswick
12	Manitoba 2
13	Nova Scotia 2
14	Manitoba 1
15	Northern Ontario 2
16	Saskatchewan 2
17	Prince Edward Island
18	Yukon

== Women ==
=== Teams ===
The teams are listed as follows:

Province / Territory	Skip	Third	Second	Lead	Alternate	Club(s)
Alberta 1	Emma DeSchiffart	Abby Desormeau	Bethany Evans	Sarah Yarmuch		Saville Community SC, Edmonton
Alberta 2	Sierra Androschuk	Rosie Mears	Ella Landry	Rhiley DeSchiffart	Ashlee Androschuk	Drayton Valley CC, Drayton Valley; Lacombe CC, Lacombe
British Columbia 1	Erin Fitzgibbon	Morgan Bowles	Ashley Fenton	Ara Yoo		Royal City CC, New Westminster
British Columbia 2	Hannah Bartlett	Cloe Hidber	Jillian Evans	Parker Rempel		Victoria CC, Victoria; Kelowna CC, Kelowna
Manitoba	Shaela Hayward	India Young	Keira Krahn	Dayna Wahl		Carman CC, Carman
New Brunswick	Mya Pugsley	Mia West	Carly Smith	Lauren Price	Casey Smith	Sackville CC, Sackville
Newfoundland and Labrador	Cailey Locke	Hayley Gushue	Sitaye Penney	Sarah Thomas		St. John's CC, St. John's
Northern Ontario 1	Claire Dubinsky	Rylie Paul	Lily Wright	Bella McCarville	Caitlin Nephin	Kakabeka Falls CC, Kakabeka Falls
Northern Ontario 2	Rhya Baker	Jorja Catt	Sydney Catt	Caleigh Holmes	Sophie Perreault	Horne Granite CC, New Liskeard
Northwest Territories	Sydney Galusha	Ella Skauge	Morgan Stabel	Brynn Chorostkowski		Yellowknife CC, Yellowknife
Nova Scotia 1	Cassidy Blades	Stephanie Atherton	Anna MacNutt	Lily Mitchell		Halifax CC, Halifax
Nova Scotia 2	Rebecca Regan	Olivia McDonah	Caylee Smith	Ella Kinley		Mayflower CC, Timberlea
Ontario 1	Dominique Vivier	Ava Acres	Riley Puhl	Mya Sharpe		RCMP CC, Ottawa
Ontario 2	Charlotte Wilson	Amelia Benning	Abigail Rushton	Sydney Anderson	Lauren Norman	Rideau CC, Ottawa
Prince Edward Island	Sophie Gallant	Veronica Pater	Kacey Gauthier	Ashlyn MacDonald	Lillian MacFadyen	Cornwall CC, Cornwall
Quebec 1	Summer St-James	Léonie Lamarre	Emma Nguyen	Alexandra Legault	Cassandra Roy	CC Pointe-Claire, Pointe-Claire
Quebec 2	Jolianne Fortin	Emy Lafrance	Megan Lafrance	Mégane Fortin		CC Kénogami, Jonquière
Saskatchewan	Chloe Semeniuk	Leah Beausoleil	Kelsey Wall	Lindsay Miller		Nutana CC, Saskatoon

=== Round robin standings ===
Final Round Robin Standings

Key
Teams to Playoffs

Pool A	Skip	W	L	W–L	DSC
Nova Scotia 1	Cassidy Blades	7	1	1–0	31.69
Quebec 2	Jolianne Fortin	7	1	0–1	45.16
Newfoundland and Labrador	Cailey Locke	6	2	–	54.17
New Brunswick	Mya Pugsley	5	3	–	66.77
British Columbia 2	Hannah Bartlett	3	5	2–0	53.74
Alberta 1	Emma DeSchiffart	3	5	1–1	67.78
Saskatchewan	Chloe Semeniuk	3	5	0–2	27.24
Ontario 2	Charlotte Wilson	2	6	–	70.01
Northern Ontario 1	Claire Dubinsky	0	8	–	64.84

Pool B	Skip	W	L	W–L	DSC
Alberta 2	Sierra Androschuk	7	1	–	33.56
Manitoba	Shaela Hayward	6	2	–	64.92
Nova Scotia 2	Rebecca Regan	5	3	1–1	33.28
Ontario 1	Dominique Vivier	5	3	1–1	72.95
British Columbia 1	Erin Fitzgibbon	5	3	1–1	85.97
Quebec 1	Summer St-James	4	4	–	45.42
Northwest Territories	Sydney Galusha	2	6	–	56.86
Prince Edward Island	Sophie Gallant	1	7	1–0	108.07
Northern Ontario 2	Rhya Baker	1	7	0–1	74.66

Pool A Round Robin Summary Table
Pos.	Team	(Alberta) AB1	(British Columbia) BC2	(New Brunswick) NB	(Newfoundland and Labrador) NL	(Northern Ontario) NO1	(Nova Scotia) NS1	(Ontario) ON2	(Quebec) QC2	(Saskatchewan) SK	Record
6	Alberta 1	—	4–5	2–10	4–6	8–2	3–10	6–4	4–6	10–2	3–5
5	British Columbia 2	5–4	—	5–7	3–7	7–5	2–6	1–10	5–8	9–5	3–5
4	New Brunswick	10–2	7–5	—	4–5	6–5	4–7	9–4	2–9	5–4	5–3
3	Newfoundland and Labrador	6–4	7–3	5–4	—	7–3	9–8	9–3	2–5	5–6	6–2
9	Northern Ontario 1	2–8	5–7	5–6	3–7	—	6–9	2–10	1–6	3–9	0–8
1	Nova Scotia 1	10–3	6–2	7–4	8–9	9–6	—	7–1	7–5	9–5	7–1
8	Ontario 2	4–6	10–1	4–9	3–9	10–2	1–7	—	0–7	3–4	2–6
2	Quebec 2	6–4	8–5	9–2	5–2	6–1	5–7	7–0	—	6–5	7–1
7	Saskatchewan	2–10	5–9	4–5	6–5	9–3	5–9	4–3	5–6	—	3–5

Pool B Round Robin Summary Table
Pos.	Team	(Alberta) AB2	(British Columbia) BC1	(Manitoba) MB	(Northern Ontario) NO2	(Northwest Territories) NT	(Nova Scotia) NS2	(Ontario) ON1	(Prince Edward Island) PE	(Quebec) QC1	Record
1	Alberta 2	—	9–4	7–3	11–5	10–2	1–9	8–4	7–2	7–6	6–1
5	British Columbia 1	4–9	—	6–5	8–1	11–2	8–7	3–6	3–2	5–8	5–3
2	Manitoba	3–7	5–6	—	9–2	8–2	7–5	7–5	9–2	7–5	6–2
9	Northern Ontario 2	5–11	1–8	2–9	—	7–9	1–8	6–10	5–7	9–5	1–7
7	Northwest Territories	2–10	2–11	2–8	9–7	—	2–8	4–5	7–5	1–11	2–6
3	Nova Scotia 2	9–1	7–8	5–7	8–1	8–2	—	6–5	9–2	4–6	5–3
4	Ontario 1	4–8	6–3	5–7	10–6	5–4	5–6	—	13–3	7–5	5–3
8	Prince Edward Island	2–7	2–3	2–9	7–5	5–7	2–9	3–13	—	3–9	1–7
6	Quebec 1	6–7	8–5	5–7	5–9	11–1	6–4	5–7	9–3	—	4–4

=== Round robin results ===
All draw times are listed in Eastern Time (UTC−04:00).

==== Draw 2 ====
Saturday, March 28, 9:00 pm

Sheet A	1	2	3	4	5	6	7	8	Final
Nova Scotia 1 (Blades) 🔨	2	1	2	0	1	0	4	X	10
Alberta 1 (DeSchiffart)	0	0	0	2	0	1	0	X	3

Sheet B	1	2	3	4	5	6	7	8	Final
New Brunswick (Pugsley)	0	0	2	0	1	0	1	0	4
Newfoundland and Labrador (Locke) 🔨	1	0	0	1	0	1	0	2	5

Sheet C	1	2	3	4	5	6	7	8	Final
Northern Ontario 1 (Dubinsky)	0	0	1	0	0	2	X	X	3
Saskatchewan (Semeniuk) 🔨	1	1	0	2	5	0	X	X	9

Sheet D	1	2	3	4	5	6	7	8	Final
British Columbia 2 (Bartlett)	0	0	0	0	0	1	X	X	1
Ontario 2 (Wilson) 🔨	2	1	4	1	2	0	X	X	10

Sheet E	1	2	3	4	5	6	7	8	Final
Quebec 1 (St-James) 🔨	0	0	2	2	0	1	0	0	5
Ontario 1 (Vivier)	1	0	0	0	2	0	2	2	7

Sheet F	1	2	3	4	5	6	7	8	Final
British Columbia 1 (Fitzgibbon) 🔨	0	0	0	2	1	1	0	2	6
Manitoba (Hayward)	0	1	1	0	0	0	3	0	5

Sheet G	1	2	3	4	5	6	7	8	9	Final
Prince Edward Island (Gallant)	0	0	1	1	0	2	1	0	0	5
Northwest Territories (Galusha) 🔨	0	2	0	0	2	0	0	1	2	7

Sheet H	1	2	3	4	5	6	7	8	Final
Nova Scotia 2 (Regan) 🔨	0	0	2	3	1	2	1	X	9
Alberta 2 (Androschuk)	0	1	0	0	0	0	0	X	1

==== Draw 4 ====
Sunday, March 29, 2:00 pm

Sheet A	1	2	3	4	5	6	7	8	Final
New Brunswick (Pugsley) 🔨	0	1	0	2	0	3	0	1	7
British Columbia 2 (Bartlett)	0	0	2	0	1	0	2	0	5

Sheet B	1	2	3	4	5	6	7	8	Final
Quebec 2 (Fortin) 🔨	1	0	1	0	1	1	2	X	6
Northern Ontario 1 (Dubinsky)	0	0	0	1	0	0	0	X	1

Sheet C	1	2	3	4	5	6	7	8	Final
Ontario 2 (Wilson)	0	0	1	0	2	0	1	0	4
Alberta 1 (DeSchiffart) 🔨	1	1	0	0	0	2	0	2	6

Sheet D	1	2	3	4	5	6	7	8	9	Final
Newfoundland and Labrador (Locke)	0	1	1	1	0	0	2	0	0	5
Saskatchewan (Semeniuk) 🔨	2	0	0	0	1	1	0	1	1	6

Sheet E	1	2	3	4	5	6	7	8	9	Final
British Columbia 1 (Fitzgibbon)	0	1	0	1	3	0	2	0	1	8
Nova Scotia 2 (Regan) 🔨	2	0	2	0	0	1	0	2	0	7

Sheet F	1	2	3	4	5	6	7	8	Final
Northern Ontario 2 (Baker) 🔨	0	0	3	2	0	0	0	0	5
Prince Edward Island (Gallant)	0	0	0	0	1	4	1	1	7

Sheet G	1	2	3	4	5	6	7	8	Final
Alberta 2 (Androschuk) 🔨	3	0	2	0	2	0	1	X	8
Ontario 1 (Vivier)	0	2	0	2	0	0	0	X	4

Sheet H	1	2	3	4	5	6	7	8	Final
Manitoba (Hayward) 🔨	0	4	3	0	1	0	X	X	8
Northwest Territories (Galusha)	0	0	0	1	0	1	X	X	2

==== Draw 6 ====
Monday, March 30, 10:00 am

Sheet A	1	2	3	4	5	6	7	8	Final
Manitoba (Hayward)	0	1	0	2	0	0	0	X	3
Alberta 2 (Androschuk) 🔨	1	0	1	0	0	1	4	X	7

Sheet B	1	2	3	4	5	6	7	8	Final
Nova Scotia 2 (Regan)	0	0	1	1	0	0	2	0	4
Quebec 1 (St-James) 🔨	1	1	0	0	2	1	0	1	6

Sheet C	1	2	3	4	5	6	7	8	Final
Northern Ontario 2 (Baker) 🔨	0	0	0	1	0	0	X	X	1
British Columbia 1 (Fitzgibbon)	0	2	3	0	0	3	X	X	8

Sheet D	1	2	3	4	5	6	7	8	Final
Ontario 1 (Vivier) 🔨	1	0	4	2	0	6	X	X	13
Prince Edward Island (Gallant)	0	2	0	0	1	0	X	X	3

Sheet E	1	2	3	4	5	6	7	8	Final
Newfoundland and Labrador (Locke) 🔨	1	3	0	2	2	1	0	X	9
Ontario 2 (Wilson)	0	0	2	0	0	0	1	X	3

Sheet F	1	2	3	4	5	6	7	8	Final
British Columbia 2 (Bartlett) 🔨	0	0	0	0	1	1	0	X	2
Nova Scotia 1 (Blades)	1	0	1	2	0	0	2	X	6

Sheet G	1	2	3	4	5	6	7	8	Final
Quebec 2 (Fortin) 🔨	2	0	2	2	0	3	X	X	9
New Brunswick (Pugsley)	0	1	0	0	1	0	X	X	2

Sheet H	1	2	3	4	5	6	7	8	Final
Alberta 1 (DeSchiffart) 🔨	0	3	3	0	1	1	X	X	8
Northern Ontario 1 (Dubinsky)	1	0	0	1	0	0	X	X	2

==== Draw 8 ====
Monday, March 30, 6:00 pm

Sheet A	1	2	3	4	5	6	7	8	Final
Ontario 1 (Vivier) 🔨	3	2	2	0	3	0	0	X	10
Northern Ontario 2 (Baker)	0	0	0	3	0	2	1	X	6

Sheet B	1	2	3	4	5	6	7	8	Final
Alberta 2 (Androschuk) 🔨	1	1	1	0	2	0	5	X	10
Northwest Territories (Galusha)	0	0	0	1	0	1	0	X	2

Sheet C	1	2	3	4	5	6	7	8	Final
Nova Scotia 2 (Regan)	0	0	1	0	2	2	0	X	5
Manitoba (Hayward) 🔨	0	4	0	1	0	0	2	X	7

Sheet D	1	2	3	4	5	6	7	8	Final
British Columbia 1 (Fitzgibbon)	0	1	0	1	0	2	1	X	5
Quebec 1 (St-James) 🔨	2	0	2	0	4	0	0	X	8

Sheet E	1	2	3	4	5	6	7	8	Final
Alberta 1 (DeSchiffart) 🔨	1	0	0	0	1	0	2	0	4
Quebec 2 (Fortin)	0	1	1	1	0	2	0	1	6

Sheet F	1	2	3	4	5	6	7	8	Final
Ontario 2 (Wilson)	0	1	0	0	2	0	0	0	3
Saskatchewan (Semeniuk) 🔨	1	0	0	1	0	1	0	1	4

Sheet G	1	2	3	4	5	6	7	8	Final
British Columbia 2 (Bartlett)	0	1	0	0	2	0	0	X	3
Newfoundland and Labrador (Locke) 🔨	2	0	2	0	0	2	1	X	7

Sheet H	1	2	3	4	5	6	7	8	Final
New Brunswick (Pugsley) 🔨	0	2	0	1	0	1	0	X	4
Nova Scotia 1 (Blades)	3	0	1	0	2	0	1	X	7

==== Draw 10 ====
Tuesday, March 31, 2:00 pm

Sheet A	1	2	3	4	5	6	7	8	Final
Saskatchewan (Semeniuk) 🔨	1	0	0	0	1	1	1	0	4
New Brunswick (Pugsley)	0	2	1	1	0	0	0	1	5

Sheet B	1	2	3	4	5	6	7	8	Final
Newfoundland and Labrador (Locke)	0	1	0	3	1	0	1	X	6
Alberta 1 (DeSchiffart) 🔨	1	0	2	0	0	1	0	X	4

Sheet C	1	2	3	4	5	6	7	8	Final
Nova Scotia 1 (Blades) 🔨	0	0	3	0	2	0	0	4	9
Northern Ontario 1 (Dubinsky)	1	1	0	2	0	1	1	0	6

Sheet D	1	2	3	4	5	6	7	8	Final
Quebec 2 (Fortin) 🔨	3	0	0	3	1	0	1	X	8
British Columbia 2 (Bartlett)	0	3	0	0	0	2	0	X	5

Sheet E	1	2	3	4	5	6	7	8	Final
Northwest Territories (Galusha) 🔨	0	1	0	1	0	0	0	X	2
British Columbia 1 (Fitzgibbon)	1	0	3	0	2	1	4	X	11

Sheet F	1	2	3	4	5	6	7	8	Final
Manitoba (Hayward) 🔨	1	0	1	0	1	0	3	1	7
Ontario 1 (Vivier)	0	2	0	1	0	2	0	0	5

Sheet G	1	2	3	4	5	6	7	8	Final
Quebec 1 (St-James)	4	0	0	2	0	3	X	X	9
Prince Edward Island (Gallant) 🔨	0	1	1	0	1	0	X	X	3

Sheet H	1	2	3	4	5	6	7	8	Final
Northern Ontario 2 (Baker)	0	0	0	0	1	0	X	X	1
Nova Scotia 2 (Regan) 🔨	2	1	3	1	0	1	X	X	8

==== Draw 12 ====
Wednesday, April 1, 10:00 am

Sheet A	1	2	3	4	5	6	7	8	Final
Northern Ontario 1 (Dubinsky) 🔨	2	0	0	1	0	0	0	0	3
Newfoundland and Labrador (Locke)	0	1	1	0	2	1	1	1	7

Sheet B	1	2	3	4	5	6	7	8	Final
Nova Scotia 1 (Blades) 🔨	0	0	2	0	1	0	1	3	7
Quebec 2 (Fortin)	1	1	0	2	0	1	0	0	5

Sheet C	1	2	3	4	5	6	7	8	Final
New Brunswick (Pugsley) 🔨	1	0	0	5	2	0	1	X	9
Ontario 2 (Wilson)	0	1	1	0	0	2	0	X	4

Sheet D	1	2	3	4	5	6	7	8	Final
Saskatchewan (Semeniuk)	0	1	0	0	0	1	0	X	2
Alberta 1 (DeSchiffart) 🔨	4	0	1	1	1	0	3	X	10

Sheet E	1	2	3	4	5	6	7	8	Final
Prince Edward Island (Gallant)	0	1	1	0	0	0	X	X	2
Manitoba (Hayward) 🔨	4	0	0	3	2	0	X	X	9

Sheet F	1	2	3	4	5	6	7	8	Final
Quebec 1 (St-James) 🔨	0	1	0	0	0	2	2	X	5
Northern Ontario 2 (Baker)	2	0	2	4	1	0	0	X	9

Sheet G	1	2	3	4	5	6	7	8	Final
British Columbia 1 (Fitzgibbon)	0	0	0	1	3	0	0	X	4
Alberta 2 (Androschuk) 🔨	1	1	3	0	0	2	2	X	9

Sheet H	1	2	3	4	5	6	7	8	Final
Northwest Territories (Galusha) 🔨	0	3	0	0	0	1	0	0	4
Ontario 1 (Vivier)	1	0	1	1	0	0	1	1	5

==== Draw 14 ====
Wednesday, April 1, 6:00 pm

Sheet A	1	2	3	4	5	6	7	8	Final
Alberta 2 (Androschuk)	1	3	0	0	0	0	0	3	7
Quebec 1 (St-James) 🔨	0	0	1	2	1	1	1	0	6

Sheet B	1	2	3	4	5	6	7	8	Final
Northwest Territories (Galusha) 🔨	0	1	0	1	0	0	0	X	2
Nova Scotia 2 (Regan)	1	0	3	0	0	1	3	X	8

Sheet C	1	2	3	4	5	6	7	8	Final
Manitoba (Hayward) 🔨	0	0	2	3	0	0	4	X	9
Northern Ontario 2 (Baker)	0	1	0	0	0	1	0	X	2

Sheet D	1	2	3	4	5	6	7	8	Final
Prince Edward Island (Gallant) 🔨	0	1	0	0	0	0	0	1	2
British Columbia 1 (Fitzgibbon)	1	0	0	1	0	0	1	0	3

Sheet E	1	2	3	4	5	6	7	8	Final
Ontario 2 (Wilson)	0	0	0	0	1	0	X	X	1
Nova Scotia 1 (Blades) 🔨	2	2	1	1	0	1	X	X	7

Sheet F	1	2	3	4	5	6	7	8	Final
Saskatchewan (Semeniuk) 🔨	2	0	0	0	0	3	0	X	5
British Columbia 2 (Bartlett)	0	2	1	2	2	0	2	X	9

Sheet G	1	2	3	4	5	6	7	8	Final
Newfoundland and Labrador (Locke) 🔨	1	0	0	0	0	1	0	0	2
Quebec 2 (Fortin)	0	2	1	0	0	0	1	1	5

Sheet H	1	2	3	4	5	6	7	8	9	Final
Northern Ontario 1 (Dubinsky) 🔨	2	0	1	0	0	1	0	1	0	5
New Brunswick (Pugsley)	0	1	0	0	2	0	2	0	1	6

==== Draw 16 ====
Thursday, April 2, 2:00 pm

Sheet A	1	2	3	4	5	6	7	8	Final
Quebec 2 (Fortin)	0	2	1	0	0	0	0	3	6
Saskatchewan (Semeniuk) 🔨	0	0	0	1	1	2	1	0	5

Sheet B	1	2	3	4	5	6	7	8	Final
Northern Ontario 1 (Dubinsky)	0	0	0	0	1	1	X	X	2
Ontario 2 (Wilson) 🔨	1	3	4	2	0	0	X	X	10

Sheet C	1	2	3	4	5	6	7	8	9	Final
Alberta 1 (DeSchiffart)	0	1	1	0	0	0	1	1	0	4
British Columbia 2 (Bartlett) 🔨	1	0	0	1	1	1	0	0	1	5

Sheet D	1	2	3	4	5	6	7	8	9	Final
Nova Scotia 1 (Blades)	0	1	0	4	1	0	0	2	0	8
Newfoundland and Labrador (Locke) 🔨	1	0	5	0	0	1	1	0	1	9

Sheet E	1	2	3	4	5	6	7	8	Final
Northern Ontario 2 (Baker)	0	1	0	2	2	0	2	0	7
Northwest Territories (Galusha) 🔨	3	0	4	0	0	1	0	1	9

Sheet F	1	2	3	4	5	6	7	8	Final
Prince Edward Island (Gallant)	0	1	0	0	0	1	0	X	2
Alberta 2 (Androschuk) 🔨	1	0	1	0	2	0	3	X	7

Sheet G	1	2	3	4	5	6	7	8	Final
Ontario 1 (Vivier)	0	0	2	0	0	0	2	1	5
Nova Scotia 2 (Regan) 🔨	2	2	0	0	1	1	0	0	6

Sheet H	1	2	3	4	5	6	7	8	Final
Quebec 1 (St-James) 🔨	0	1	1	1	0	2	0	0	5
Manitoba (Hayward)	1	0	0	0	3	0	1	2	7

==== Draw 18 ====
Friday, April 3, 10:00 am

Sheet A	1	2	3	4	5	6	7	8	Final
Nova Scotia 2 (Regan) 🔨	2	2	0	2	1	0	2	X	9
Prince Edward Island (Gallant)	0	0	1	0	0	1	0	X	2

Sheet B	1	2	3	4	5	6	7	8	Final
Ontario 1 (Vivier)	0	2	0	1	2	0	1	X	6
British Columbia 1 (Fitzgibbon) 🔨	1	0	1	0	0	1	0	X	3

Sheet C	1	2	3	4	5	6	7	8	Final
Northwest Territories (Galusha) 🔨	0	0	0	0	1	0	X	X	1
Quebec 1 (St-James)	3	1	5	1	0	1	X	X	11

Sheet D	1	2	3	4	5	6	7	8	Final
Alberta 2 (Androschuk) 🔨	0	6	3	0	1	1	0	X	11
Northern Ontario 2 (Baker)	1	0	0	3	0	0	1	X	5

Sheet E	1	2	3	4	5	6	7	8	9	Final
British Columbia 2 (Bartlett)	0	0	0	0	4	0	1	0	2	7
Northern Ontario 1 (Dubinsky) 🔨	0	2	1	0	0	1	0	1	0	5

Sheet F	1	2	3	4	5	6	7	8	Final
Alberta 1 (DeSchiffart)	0	0	0	0	2	0	X	X	2
New Brunswick (Pugsley) 🔨	1	2	2	2	0	3	X	X	10

Sheet G	1	2	3	4	5	6	7	8	Final
Saskatchewan (Semeniuk)	0	2	0	2	0	1	0	X	5
Nova Scotia 1 (Blades) 🔨	2	0	3	0	1	0	3	X	9

Sheet H	1	2	3	4	5	6	7	8	Final
Ontario 2 (Wilson)	0	0	0	0	0	0	X	X	0
Quebec 2 (Fortin) 🔨	0	3	1	1	1	1	X	X	7

=== Playoffs ===
Quarterfinals
B2	Manitoba	6
A3	Newfoundland and Labrador	2
A2	Quebec 2	9
B3	Nova Scotia 2	2

Semifinals
A1	Nova Scotia 1	5
B2	Manitoba	7
B1	Alberta 2	3
A2	Quebec 2	8

Final
B2	Manitoba	7
A2	Quebec 2	8
Bronze medal game
A1	Nova Scotia 1	6
B1	Alberta 2	5

==== Quarterfinals ====
Friday, April 3, 6:00 pm

Sheet A	1	2	3	4	5	6	7	8	Final
Manitoba (Hayward)	0	2	0	2	0	1	1	X	6
Newfoundland and Labrador (Locke) 🔨	0	0	0	0	2	0	0	X	2

Sheet C	1	2	3	4	5	6	7	8	Final
Quebec 2 (Fortin) 🔨	0	3	2	0	2	0	2	X	9
Nova Scotia 2 (Regan)	0	0	0	1	0	1	0	X	2

==== Semifinals ====
Saturday, April 4, 9:00 am

Sheet A	1	2	3	4	5	6	7	8	Final
Alberta 2 (Androschuk)	0	1	1	0	1	0	0	X	3
Quebec 2 (Fortin) 🔨	1	0	0	3	0	2	2	X	8

Sheet D	1	2	3	4	5	6	7	8	9	Final
Nova Scotia 1 (Blades) 🔨	2	0	0	2	1	0	0	0	0	5
Manitoba (Hayward)	0	0	1	0	0	2	1	1	2	7

==== Bronze medal game ====
Saturday, April 4, 3:00 pm

Sheet B	1	2	3	4	5	6	7	8	Final
Nova Scotia 1 (Blades)	0	1	2	0	1	0	2	0	6
Alberta 2 (Androschuk) 🔨	2	0	0	1	0	1	0	1	5

==== Final ====
Saturday, April 4, 3:00 pm

Sheet C	1	2	3	4	5	6	7	8	Final
Manitoba (Hayward)	0	0	3	2	0	2	0	0	7
Quebec 2 (Fortin) 🔨	2	1	0	0	1	0	2	2	8

=== Final standings ===
Place	Team
1st place, gold medalist(s)	Quebec 2
2nd place, silver medalist(s)	Manitoba
3rd place, bronze medalist(s)	Nova Scotia 1
4	Alberta 2
5	Nova Scotia 2
6	Newfoundland and Labrador
7	New Brunswick
8	Ontario 1
9	British Columbia 2
10	British Columbia 1
11	Quebec 1
12	Alberta 1
13	Saskatchewan
14	Northwest Territories
15	Ontario 2
16	Prince Edward Island
17	Northern Ontario 1
18	Northern Ontario 2
