= United States Arena Curling Championships =

United States Arena Curling Championship
- Established: 2013
- 2026 host city: Irving, Texas
- 2026 arena: Dallas-Ft.Worth CC

Current champions (2025)
- Men: (Texas) Myers (4th title); Dallas-Ft.Worth CC
- Women: (South Dakota) Andenas-Weber; Sioux Falls CC

The United States Arena Curling Championships are annual national curling championships for men and women that are members of arena curling clubs. Arena curling clubs do not have their own facilities and instead rent ice time at traditional ice arenas. The tournament is run by the United States Curling Association.

The 2019 Arena Curling Championships were held May 5-11, 2019 in West Chester, Pennsylvania, making West Chester the first site to hold the Arena Championships more than once.

The 2020 Arena Curling Championships were set to be held April 26 to May 2, 2020 at the Wyoming Center Spirit Hall Ice Arena in Gillette, Wyoming. But they were cancelled due to the COVID-19 pandemic, with Gillette instead getting the opportunity to host the Arena Curling Championships in 2022.

== Past champions ==
=== Men ===
Year	Host City	Winning Club	Club location	Skip	Third	Second	Lead	Alternate
2013	Fort Wayne, IN	(Michigan) Kalamazoo CC	Kalamazoo, MI	Garnet Eckstrand	Kent Elliott	Marcus Gleaton	Thomas Deater	
2014	Lansing, MI	(Colorado) Broadmoor CC	Colorado Springs, CO	Guy Scholz	Kevin Lyons	Gordon Harrison	Nathan Mascarenas	
2015	Cedar Rapids, IA	(Texas) Dallas Ft. Worth CC	Irving, TX	Jeffrey Knott	Laith Sando	Nick Myers	Kevin Roberts	John Lambert
2016	West Chester, PA	(Pennsylvania) Pittsburgh CC	Pittsburgh, PA	Mark Robinson	Nick Visnich	Alex Visnich	Steve Buffington	
2017	Notre Dame, IN	(Texas) Curling Club of Houston	Houston, TX	Christopher Doremus	Billy Reynolds	Carl Schaeper	Matthew Kane	
2018	Salt Lake City, UT	(Texas) Dallas Ft. Worth CC	Irving, TX	Jeffrey Knott	Laith Sando	Nick Myers	Kevin Roberts	John Lambert
2019	West Chester, PA	(Texas) Dallas Ft. Worth CC	Irving, TX	Nick Myers	Laith Sando	Kevin Roberts	John Lambert	Stephen Kleppe
2020	Gillette, WY	Cancelled						
2021	Worcester, MA	Cancelled						
2022	Eveleth, MN	(Texas) Dallas Ft. Worth CC	Irving, TX	Nick Myers	Laith Sando	Kevin Roberts	John Lambert	
2023	Eveleth, MN	(Texas) Dallas Ft. Worth CC	Irving, TX	Nick Myers	Laith Sando	Kevin Roberts	John Lambert	
2024	Wausau, WI	(California) Wine Country CC	Sacramento, CA	Camren Spangler	William Hillman	Brian Feldman Jr.	Brian Feldman Sr.	
2025	Paradise, NV	(Texas) Dallas Ft. Worth CC	Irving, TX	Nick Myers	Laith Sando	Kevin Roberts	John Lambert	
2026	Irving, TX							

=== Women ===
Year	Host City	Winning Club	Club Location	Skip	Third	Second	Lead	Alternate
2013	Fort Wayne, IN	(Minnesota) Dakota CC	Burnsville, MN	Darcy Ellarby	Jennifer Witschen	Robyn Farm	Julie Wennberg	Beth Lundquist
2014	Lansing, MI	(Michigan) Kalamazoo CC	Kalamazoo, MI	Stephanie Senneker	Pamela Nelson	Nicole Brinkmann Reeves	Valeria Hart-Young	Barbara Little
2015	Cedar Rapids, IA	(California) San Francisco Bay Area CC	Oakland, CA	Sarah Walsh	Kimberly Chapin	BriAnna Weldon	Pamela Montbach	
2016	West Chester, PA	(California) San Francisco Bay Area CC	Oakland, CA	Sarah Walsh	Kimberly Chapin	BriAnna Weldon	Pamela Montbach	
2017	Notre Dame, IN	Oklahoma CC	Oklahoma City, OK	Nicole Merrifield	Angela Strange	Kristy Witzke	Jennifer Bates	
2018	Salt Lake City, UT	(Ohio) Cleveland Skating Club	Cleveland, OH	Kathryn Mercer	Carole Negus	Rebecca Storey	Elizabeth Feighan	
2019	West Chester, PA	(Texas) Curling Club of Houston	Houston, TX	Merlin Howick	Man-Fong Mah	Alyssa Parks	Sara Johnson	Kelly Reynolds
2020	Gillette, WY	Cancelled						
2021	Worcester, MA	Cancelled						
2022	Eveleth, MN	(Texas) Curling Club of Houston	Houston, TX	Julie Segovia	Alyssa Parks	Jessica Bostwick	Merlin Howick	
2023	Eveleth, MN	(Texas) Curling Club of Houston	Houston, TX	Julie Segovia	Alyssa Parks	Heather Cook	Jessica Bostwick	
2024	Wausau, WI	(California) Silicon Valley CC	San Jose, CA	Jennifer Asis	Melissa Wheeler	Julie Wolf	Jaclyn Pytlarz (vice)	Kathalin Alsmeier
2025	Paradise, NV	(South Dakota) Sioux Falls CC	Sioux Falls, SD	Morgan Andenas-Weber	Jennifer Anglin	Sarah Linneman	Samantha Garrett	
2026	Irving, TX							
