= Mountain Pacific Curling Association =

- Sport: Curling
- Jurisdiction: Regional
- Membership: 20 curling clubs
- Abbreviation: MoPac
- Founded: 2003
- Affiliation: United States Curling Association

Official website
- www.mopacca.org
- (United States)

An old logo for the MoPac Curling Association

The Mountain Pacific Curling Association (MoPac) is a regional association of the United States Curling Association encompassing the states of Arizona, California, Idaho, Oregon, Montana, Nevada, and Utah.

MoPac sends regional representatives to a number of national competitions, hosting playdowns to determine the representative if there are multiple teams interested. In addition, MoPac has held a 5 & Under Bonspiel annually since 2012 for any curlers of member clubs that have been curling for 5 years or less.

== Member clubs ==
State	Club name	City	Type	Year founded
Arizona	Coyotes Curling Club	Tempe	Dedicated	2003
California	Curl San Diego	Carlsbad	Arena	2006
California	Granite Curling Club of California	Stockton	Arena	1962
California	Hollywood Curling Club	Vernon	Arena	2007
California	Orange County Curling Club	Westminster	Arena	2009
California	Sharks Ice Curling	Oakland	Arena	2022
California	Silicon Valley Curling Club	San Jose and Fremont	Arena	2017
California	San Francisco Bay Area Curling Club	Oakland	Dedicated	1958
California	Wine Country Curling Club	Roseville	Arena	2006
Idaho	Boise Curling Club	Boise	Arena	2004
Idaho	McCall Curling Club	McCall	Arena	2004
Nevada	Lake Tahoe Epic Curling	Stateline	Dedicated	2012
Oregon	Klamath Falls Curling	Klamath Falls	Arena	
Utah	Cache Valley Stone Society	North Logan	Arena	
Utah	Ogden Curling Club	Ogden	Arena	1998
Utah	Park City Curling Club	Park City	Arena	2006
Utah	Utah Olympic Oval Curling Club	Kearns	Arena	2016
