= Wisconsin State Curling Association =

- Sport: Curling
- Jurisdiction: Regional
- Membership: 28 curling clubs
- Abbreviation: WSCA
- Founded: 1964
- Affiliation: United States Curling Association

Official website
- www.wi-curling.org
- (United States)

The Wisconsin State Curling Association (WSCA) is a regional association of the United States Curling Association (USCA). Founded in 1964, the WSCA has 28 member curling clubs across Wisconsin, facilitating communication between the clubs and the national USCA as well as organizing various annual state curling championships.

== History ==
The original Wisconsin Curling Association was founded in 1908 with L.J. Tucker from Pardeeville as the first president. Annual bonspiels were held throughout much of the first half of the 1900s. In 1945, the Portage Curling Club, home of the Wisconsin Curling Association, burned down. Later that year, the Midwest Curling Association was created to organize clubs across Nebraska, Ohio, Minnesota, Wisconsin, Illinois, Michigan, and North Dakota. The Midwest Curling Association disbanded in 1964 and later that year the modern incarnation Wisconsin State Curling Association was founded to represent the clubs within that state. Representatives from 27 curling clubs were at the meeting where the association was founded.

== Member clubs ==
The association has 29 member clubs.

Club name	City/town	Type	Sheets	Year founded
Alpine Curling Club	Monroe	Dedicated	2	1960
Appleton Curling Club	Appleton	Dedicated	4	1939
Arlington Curling Club	Arlington	Dedicated	3	abt 1935
Blackhawk Curling Club	Janesville	Dedicated	3	
Centerville Curling Club	Trempealeau	Dedicated	4	1948
Clintonville Curling Club	Clintonville	Dedicated	2	1948
Eau Claire Curling Club	Eau Claire	Dedicated	4	1876
Green Bay Curling Club	Green Bay	Dedicated	3	1958
Kettle Moraine Curling Club	Hartland	Dedicated	5	1962
La Crosse Curling Club	Onalaska	Arena	5	1914
Loch Wissota Curling Club	Eau Claire	Outdoor	1	
Lodi Curling Club	Lodi	Dedicated	2	1880
Madison Curling Club	McFarland	Dedicated	6	1921
Marshfield Curling Club, Inc.	Marshfield	Dedicated	3	1976
Medford Curling Club	Medford	Dedicated	4	1914
Milwaukee Curling Club	Cedarburg	Dedicated	5	1845
Pardeeville Curling Club	Pardeeville	Dedicated	2	1875
Portage Curling Club	Portage	Dedicated	4	1850
Poynette Curling Club	Poynette	Dedicated	2	1875
Racine Curling Club	Racine	Dedicated	2	1954
Rhinelander Curling Club	Rhinelander	Arena	4	2023
Rice Lake Curling Club	Rice Lake	Dedicated	4	1967
Stevens Point Curling Club	Stevens Point	Dedicated	4	1959
Superior Curling Club	Superior	Dedicated	4	1893
Tri-City Curling Club	Wisconsin Rapids	Dedicated	2	1958
Waukesha Curling Club	Waukesha	Dedicated	3	
Waupaca Curling Club	Waupaca	Dedicated	4	1879
Wausau Curling Club	Wausau	Dedicated	8	1925
Wauwatosa Curling Club	Wauwatosa	Dedicated	4	1921
