= Minnesota Curling Association =

- Sport: Curling
- Jurisdiction: Regional
- Membership: 29 curling clubs
- Abbreviation: MCA
- Affiliation: United States Curling Association

Official website
- mncurling.org
- (United States)

The Minnesota Curling Association is one of eleven regional associations of the United States Curling Association.

== Member clubs ==
Club name	City	Type	Sheets	Year founded	Notes
Arden Hills Curling Club	St. Paul	Dedicated	8		Plays at the St. Paul Curling Club.
Bemidji Curling Club	Bemidji	Dedicated	6	1935	
Brainerd Lakes Curling Association	Brainerd	Dedicated	4	2006	
Buhl Curling Club	Buhl	Dedicated	4		
Cambridge Curling Club	Cambridge	Dedicated	4	1974	
Chaska Curling Club	Chaska	Dedicated	6	2015	
Chisholm Curling Club	Chisholm	Dedicated	4		
Cook County Curling Club	Grand Marais	Dedicated	4		
Curl Mesabi	Eveleth	Dedicated	8	1998	
Dakota Curling	Lakeville	Dedicated	6	2006	Moved from arena to dedicated facility January 2017
Duluth Curling Club	Duluth	Dedicated	8	1891	
Four Seasons Curling Club	Blaine	Dedicated	6	2012	
Glacial Ridge Curling	Willmar	Arena	5	2004	Formerly known as the Willmar Curling Club
Hallock Curling Club	Hallock	Dedicated	3		
Heather-Mapleton Curling Club	Mapleton	Dedicated	4		
Hibbing Curling Club	Hibbing	Dedicated	7	1913	
International Falls Curling Club	International Falls	Dedicated	6		Rents ice at Fort Frances Country Club, Ontario, Canada.
Itasca Curling Club	Grand Rapids	Dedicated	4	1968	
Lakes Curling Club	Detroit Lakes	Dedicated	4	1980	
Mankato Curling Club	Mankato	Dedicated	5	1903	Formerly known as the Caledonia Curling Club
Owatonna Curling Club	Owatonna	Dedicated	2		
Curling Club of Rochester	Rochester	Arena	4	2017	
St. Paul Curling Club	St. Paul	Dedicated	8	1888	
Stephen Curling Club	Stephen	Dedicated	3		
Thief River Falls Curling Club	Thief River Falls	Dedicated	4		
Twin Cities Curling Association	Minneapolis				Works as an association to help new clubs form.
Two Harbors Curling Club	Two Harbors	Dedicated	4	1963	
Vikingland Curling Club	Alexandria	Arena	5	2005	
Walker Curling Club	Walker	Arena	4	2007	
