= 2026 World Junior Mixed Doubles Curling Championship =

- Host city: Edmonton, Alberta, Canada
- Arena: Saville Community Sports Centre
- Dates: May 5–10
- Winner: Japan
- Female: Yuina Miura
- Male: Kaito Fujii
- Coach: Ayumi Ogasawara
- Finalist: Canada (Ideson / Henry)

The 2026 World Junior Mixed Doubles Curling Championship (branded as the 2026 Booster Juice World Junior Mixed Doubles Curling Championship for sponsorship reasons) was held from May 5 to 10 at the Saville Community Sports Centre in Edmonton, Alberta, Canada.

The championship followed the same format as last year, in which there was a round-robin format with four groups. The top two teams in each group qualified for the quarterfinals. Teams were ranked 1 to 8 by comparing the DSCs of the teams with the same rank from each group.

Japan's Yuina Miura and Kaito Fujii won the event, coming back from a three-point deficit to defeat Canada's Brooklyn Ideson and Owen Henry 6–5. After Canada got two in the fifth end to go ahead 5–2, the Japanese pair got one in the sixth end before stealing one in the seventh and two in the eighth end to earn the world championship title. Scotland's Tia Laurie and Ethan Brewster won the bronze medal in a 10–7 victory over Denmark's Katrine and Jacob Schmidt.

== Teams ==
The teams are listed as follows:

Australia	Austria	Brazil	Canada	China
Female: Marcy Forge; Male: Thomas Bence	Female: Hannah Wittibschläger; Male: Florian Kramlinger	Female: Ana Teodoro; Male: Pedro Ribeiro	Female: Brooklyn Ideson; Male: Owen Henry	Female: Meng Bowen; Male: Wu Junxiang
Czech Republic	Denmark	England	Finland	France
Female: Sofie Krupičková; Male: Ondřej Bláha	Female: Katrine Schmidt; Male: Jacob Schmidt	Female: Chloe McNaughton; Male: Matthew Waring	Female: Lara Sajaniemi; Male: Santeri Jokiharju	Female: Lise Walter; Male: Anselme Lutaud
Germany	Hong Kong	Hungary	Italy	Japan
Female: Emma Waltenburger; Male: Lukas Jäger	Female: Chi-Hei Leung; Male: Chun-Sing Chang	Female: Dorina Dencso; Male: Arpad Karpati	Female: Allegra Grande; Male: Cesare Spiller	Female: Yuina Miura; Male: Kaito Fujii
Kazakhstan	Kenya	New Zealand	Norway	Philippines
Female: Inzhu Beiimbet; Male: Aidos Alliyar	Female: Kyra Sheri Kemu; Male: Samuel Ochieng	Female: Ellie McKenzie; Male: Jed Nevill	Female: Sylvi Hausstätter; Male: Sondre Svorkmo-Lundberg	Female: Arianna Atienza; Male: Elijah Mojado
Poland	Romania	Scotland	Slovenia	South Korea
Female: Malgorzata Frysz; Male: Szymon Rokita	Female: Ania Bacali; Male: Tudor Pop	Female: Tia Laurie; Male: Ethan Brewster	Female: Lana Zaveljcina; Male: Maks Ömerzel	Female: Kang Bo-bae; Male: Kim Hak-jun
Spain	Sweden	Switzerland	United States	
Female: Paula Salvador; Male: Ismael Mingorance	Female: Moa Dryburgh; Male: Vilmer Nygren	Female: Zoe Schwaller; Male: Livio Ernst	Female: Ella Wendling; Male: Benji Paral	

== Round robin standings ==
Final Round Robin Standings

Key
Teams to Playoffs

Group A	Athletes	W	L	W–L	DSC
Japan	Yuina Miura / Kaito Fujii	6	1	1–1	30.590
Czech Republic	Sofie Krupičková / Ondřej Bláha	6	1	1–1	42.830
Italy	Allegra Grande / Cesare Spiller	6	1	1–1	51.710
United States	Ella Wendling / Benji Paral	4	3	–	28.610
Kazakhstan	Inzhu Beiimbet / Aidos Alliyar	3	4	–	128.700
Poland	Malgorzata Frysz / Szymon Rokita	2	5	–	79.570
Brazil	Ana Teodoro / Pedro Ribeiro	1	6	–	121.800
Hong Kong	Chi-Hei Cheung / Chun-Sing Chang	0	7	–	112.200

Group B	Athletes	W	L	W–L	DSC
Denmark	Katrine Schmidt / Jacob Schmidt	6	0	–	16.280
Norway	Sylvi Hausstätter / Sondre Svorkmo-Lundberg	5	1	–	34.480
Switzerland	Zoe Schwaller / Livio Ernst	4	2	–	46.050
Spain	Paula Salvador / Ismael Mingorance	3	3	–	44.080
Romania	Ania Bacali / Tudor Pop	2	4	–	67.870
Hungary	Dorina Dencso / Arpad Karpati	1	5	–	112.390
Kenya	Kyra Sheri Kemu / Samuel Ochieng	0	6	–	186.220

Group C	Athletes	W	L	W–L	DSC
Scotland	Tia Laurie / Ethan Brewster	6	0	–	44.810
South Korea	Kang Bo-bae / Kim Hak-jun	5	1	–	42.420
China	Meng Bowen / Wu Junxiang	4	2	–	50.900
Australia	Marcy Forge / Thomas Bence	3	3	–	87.910
Austria	Hannah Wittibschläger / Florian Kramlinger	2	4	–	66.780
Philippines	Arianna Atienza / Elijah Mojado	1	5	–	58.980
France	Lise Walter / Anselme Lutaud	0	6	–	71.400

Group D	Athletes	W	L	W–L	DSC
Canada	Brooklyn Ideson / Owen Henry	6	0	–	65.670
Germany	Emma Waltenburger / Lukas Jäger	5	1	–	82.680
Sweden	Moa Dryburgh / Vilmer Nygren	4	2	–	32.570
England	Chloe McNaughton / Matthew Waring	3	3	–	63.300
Finland	Lara Sajaniemi / Santeri Jokiharju	2	4	–	43.950
New Zealand	Ellie McKenzie / Jed Nevill	1	5	–	67.790
Slovenia	Lana Zaveljcina / Maks Ömerzel	0	6	–	141.370

Group A Round Robin Summary Table
Pos.	Country	Brazil	Czech Republic	Hong Kong	Italy	Japan	Kazakhstan	Poland	United States	Record
7	Brazil	—	3–11	10–3	6–11	3–7	0–11	5–8	2–9	1–6
2	Czech Republic	11–3	—	12–5	6–5	5–8	11–2	8–1	9–3	6–1
8	Hong Kong	3–10	5–12	—	1–11	1–10	4–10	6–10	1–19	0–7
3	Italy	11–6	5–6	11–1	—	7–5	11–4	11–8	8–5	6–1
1	Japan	7–3	8–5	10–1	5–7	—	7–5	8–4	8–4	6–1
5	Kazakhstan	11–0	2–11	10–4	4–11	5–7	—	8–6	2–11	3–4
6	Poland	8–5	1–8	10–6	8–11	4–8	6–8	—	6–9	2–5
4	United States	9–2	3–9	19–1	5–8	4–8	11–2	9–6	—	4–3

Group B Round Robin Summary Table
Pos.	Country	Denmark	Hungary	Kenya	Norway	Romania	Spain	Switzerland	Record
1	Denmark	—	13–3	20–0	8–2	15–0	10–2	12–4	6–0
6	Hungary	3–13	—	W–L	7–8	7–10	1–8	5–7	1–5
7	Kenya	0–20	L–W	—	L–W	2–12	0–16	1–16	0–6
2	Norway	2–8	8–7	W–L	—	10–3	7–4	9–6	5–1
5	Romania	0–15	10–7	12–2	3–10	—	L–W	1–11	2–4
4	Spain	2–10	8–1	16–0	4–7	W–L	—	3–7	3–3
3	Switzerland	4–12	7–5	16–1	6–9	11–1	7–3	—	4–2

Group C Round Robin Summary Table
Pos.	Country	Australia	Austria	China	France	Philippines	Scotland	South Korea	Record
4	Australia	—	7–4	6–7	9–0	8–4	7–8	0–13	3–3
5	Austria	4–7	—	2–10	6–4	11–1	2–11	3–7	2–4
3	China	7–6	10–2	—	9–1	10–2	3–7	5–8	4–2
7	France	0–9	4–6	1–9	—	9–11	0–8	3–13	0–6
6	Philippines	4–8	1–11	2–10	11–9	—	1–14	0–14	1–5
1	Scotland	8–7	11–2	7–3	8–0	14–1	—	9–1	6–0
2	South Korea	13–0	7–3	8–5	13–3	14–0	1–9	—	5–1

Group D Round Robin Summary Table
Pos.	Country	Canada	England	Finland	Germany	New Zealand	Slovenia	Sweden	Record
1	Canada	—	10–1	10–4	13–2	9–1	16–2	6–2	6–0
4	England	1–10	—	12–4	1–8	7–5	8–3	4–8	3–3
5	Finland	4–10	4–12	—	1–10	8–2	8–3	4–12	2–4
2	Germany	2–13	8–1	10–1	—	8–5	9–1	10–6	5–1
6	New Zealand	1–9	5–7	2–8	5–8	—	8–6	6–9	1–5
7	Slovenia	2–16	3–8	3–8	1–9	6–8	—	1–12	0–6
3	Sweden	2–6	8–4	12–4	6–10	9–6	12–1	—	4–2

== Round robin results ==
All draws times are listed in Mountain Time Zone (UTC−06:00).

=== Draw 1 ===
Tuesday, May 5, 9:00

Sheet A	1	2	3	4	5	6	7	8	Final
Slovenia	0	0	3	0	1	2	0	X	6
New Zealand 🔨	2	3	0	1	0	0	2	X	8

Sheet C	1	2	3	4	5	6	7	8	9	Final
Italy 🔨	0	0	0	0	2	1	1	1	0	5
Czech Republic	1	2	1	1	0	0	0	0	1	6

Sheet E	1	2	3	4	5	6	7	8	Final
Kazakhstan	0	1	1	1	2	0	2	1	8
Poland 🔨	2	0	0	0	0	4	0	0	6

Sheet B	1	2	3	4	5	6	7	8	Final
Brazil	0	1	1	0	0	0	1	X	3
Japan 🔨	2	0	0	3	1	1	0	X	7

Sheet D	1	2	3	4	5	6	7	8	Final
Hong Kong	0	0	0	1	0	0	X	X	1
United States 🔨	5	1	3	0	5	5	X	X	19

Sheet F	1	2	3	4	5	6	7	8	Final
Philippines 🔨	0	4	3	0	0	0	3	1	11
France	3	0	0	3	1	2	0	0	9

=== Draw 2 ===
Tuesday, May 5, 12:30

Sheet A	1	2	3	4	5	6	7	8	Final
Germany	0	4	1	0	3	0	1	1	10
Sweden 🔨	1	0	0	1	0	4	0	0	6

Sheet C	1	2	3	4	5	6	7	8	Final
Denmark 🔨	0	2	2	2	0	1	3	X	10
Spain	1	0	0	0	1	0	0	X	2

Sheet F	1	2	3	4	5	6	7	8	Final
Canada	2	0	2	2	1	3	X	X	10
England 🔨	0	1	0	0	0	0	X	X	1

Sheet B	Final
Norway 🔨	W
Kenya	L

Sheet D	1	2	3	4	5	6	7	8	Final
Romania 🔨	0	0	0	0	1	0	X	X	1
Switzerland	1	2	2	2	0	4	X	X	11

=== Draw 3 ===
Tuesday, May 5, 16:00

Sheet B	1	2	3	4	5	6	7	8	Final
Philippines	0	0	1	0	0	1	X	X	2
China 🔨	3	2	0	4	1	0	X	X	10

Sheet D	1	2	3	4	5	6	7	8	Final
Australia	0	0	0	2	0	2	0	3	7
Scotland 🔨	1	2	2	0	2	0	1	0	8

Sheet C	1	2	3	4	5	6	7	8	Final
South Korea	2	1	0	3	1	0	0	X	7
Austria 🔨	0	0	1	0	0	1	1	X	3

Sheet E	1	2	3	4	5	6	7	8	Final
Slovenia	1	1	1	0	0	0	0	X	3
Finland 🔨	0	0	0	3	1	2	2	X	8

=== Draw 4 ===
Tuesday, May 5, 19:30

Sheet A	Final
Kenya	L
Hungary 🔨	W

Sheet D	1	2	3	4	5	6	7	8	Final
Brazil 🔨	0	0	0	1	0	3	0	1	5
Poland	2	1	1	0	2	0	2	0	8

Sheet F	1	2	3	4	5	6	7	8	Final
Hong Kong	0	0	0	0	1	0	0	X	1
Italy 🔨	2	2	1	3	0	2	1	X	11

Sheet C	1	2	3	4	5	6	7	8	Final
Japan 🔨	3	1	0	2	0	0	1	X	7
Kazakhstan	0	0	1	0	2	2	0	X	5

Sheet E	1	2	3	4	5	6	7	8	Final
Czech Republic	1	1	0	2	3	0	2	X	9
United States 🔨	0	0	1	0	0	2	0	X	3

=== Draw 5 ===
Wednesday, May 6, 9:00

Sheet B	1	2	3	4	5	6	7	8	Final
Romania	0	0	0	0	0	0	X	X	0
Denmark 🔨	3	1	3	3	1	4	X	X	15

Sheet D	1	2	3	4	5	6	7	8	Final
England 🔨	0	0	0	0	0	1	X	X	1
Germany	1	1	1	2	3	0	X	X	8

Sheet C	1	2	3	4	5	6	7	8	Final
Sweden 🔨	0	1	0	0	0	1	0	X	2
Canada	1	0	1	2	1	0	1	X	6

Sheet E	1	2	3	4	5	6	7	8	Final
Spain 🔨	0	0	0	1	1	0	1	X	3
Switzerland	1	2	2	0	0	2	0	X	7

=== Draw 6 ===
Wednesday, May 6, 12:30

Sheet A	1	2	3	4	5	6	7	8	Final
Austria	1	1	1	0	4	1	3	X	11
Philippines 🔨	0	0	0	1	0	0	0	X	1

Sheet E	1	2	3	4	5	6	7	8	Final
China	2	1	1	1	0	2	2	X	9
France 🔨	0	0	0	0	1	0	0	X	1

Sheet B	1	2	3	4	5	6	7	8	Final
Australia 🔨	0	0	0	0	0	0	X	X	0
South Korea	3	2	2	3	2	1	X	X	13

Sheet F	1	2	3	4	5	6	7	8	Final
Finland 🔨	0	1	2	3	0	1	1	X	8
New Zealand	1	0	0	0	1	0	0	X	2

=== Draw 7 ===
Wednesday, May 6, 16:00

Sheet A	1	2	3	4	5	6	7	8	Final
Italy 🔨	0	6	2	0	1	0	2	X	11
Brazil	1	0	0	2	0	3	0	X	6

Sheet C	1	2	3	4	5	6	7	8	Final
Poland 🔨	4	1	1	0	1	0	0	3	10
Hong Kong	0	0	0	1	0	3	2	0	6

Sheet E	1	2	3	4	5	6	7	8	Final
Germany	0	1	0	0	1	0	X	X	2
Canada 🔨	4	0	4	2	0	3	X	X	13

Sheet B	1	2	3	4	5	6	7	8	Final
England	1	0	1	1	0	0	1	X	4
Sweden 🔨	0	1	0	0	4	3	0	X	8

Sheet D	1	2	3	4	5	6	7	8	Final
Japan 🔨	3	0	0	0	2	0	3	0	8
Czech Republic	0	1	1	1	0	1	0	1	5

Sheet F	1	2	3	4	5	6	7	8	Final
United States 🔨	3	3	3	1	0	0	1	X	11
Kazakhstan	0	0	0	0	1	1	0	X	2

=== Draw 8 ===
Wednesday, May 6, 19:30

Sheet A	1	2	3	4	5	6	7	8	Final
Hungary 🔨	0	2	0	1	0	4	0	X	7
Romania	1	0	2	0	5	0	2	X	10

Sheet E	1	2	3	4	5	6	7	8	Final
Scotland 🔨	2	2	3	0	1	1	X	X	9
South Korea	0	0	0	1	0	0	X	X	1

Sheet D	1	2	3	4	5	6	7	8	Final
Denmark 🔨	5	3	1	4	3	4	X	X	20
Kenya	0	0	0	0	0	0	X	X	0

Sheet F	1	2	3	4	5	6	7	8	Final
Norway 🔨	2	1	1	0	0	2	0	1	7
Spain	0	0	0	2	1	0	1	0	4

=== Draw 9 ===
Thursday, May 7, 9:00

Sheet B	1	2	3	4	5	6	7	8	Final
Canada	0	1	2	2	1	0	4	X	10
Finland 🔨	2	0	0	0	0	2	0	X	4

Sheet E	1	2	3	4	5	6	7	8	Final
Austria 🔨	0	0	0	0	2	0	2	X	4
Australia	1	2	1	1	0	2	0	X	7

Sheet C	1	2	3	4	5	6	7	8	Final
Germany	1	3	1	0	3	1	X	X	9
Slovenia 🔨	0	0	0	1	0	0	X	X	1

Sheet F	1	2	3	4	5	6	7	8	Final
New Zealand 🔨	1	1	0	2	0	1	0	1	6
Sweden	0	0	3	0	4	0	2	0	9

=== Draw 10 ===
Thursday, May 7, 12:30

Sheet A	1	2	3	4	5	6	7	8	9	Final
Poland 🔨	2	0	3	0	0	1	0	0	0	6
United States	0	1	0	2	1	0	1	1	3	9

Sheet C	1	2	3	4	5	6	7	8	Final
Scotland 🔨	0	2	1	1	1	0	2	X	7
China	1	0	0	0	0	2	0	X	2

Sheet E	1	2	3	4	5	6	7	8	Final
Italy 🔨	0	1	0	2	0	2	1	1	7
Japan	1	0	3	0	1	0	0	0	5

Sheet B	1	2	3	4	5	6	7	8	Final
Kazakhstan	0	0	1	0	1	0	0	X	2
Czech Republic 🔨	1	1	0	5	0	2	2	X	11

Sheet D	1	2	3	4	5	6	7	8	Final
Philippines	0	0	0	0	0	0	X	X	0
South Korea 🔨	4	1	1	4	2	2	X	X	14

Sheet F	1	2	3	4	5	6	7	8	Final
Brazil	1	2	0	3	1	0	3	X	10
Hong Kong 🔨	0	0	1	0	0	2	0	X	3

=== Draw 11 ===
Thursday, May 7, 16:00

Sheet A	1	2	3	4	5	6	7	8	Final
Switzerland 🔨	5	3	4	3	1	0	X	X	16
Kenya	0	0	0	0	0	1	X	X	1

Sheet D	1	2	3	4	5	6	7	8	Final
Spain	2	0	4	0	1	1	X	X	8
Hungary 🔨	0	1	0	0	0	0	X	X	1

Sheet C	1	2	3	4	5	6	7	8	Final
France	0	0	0	0	0	0	X	X	0
Australia 🔨	2	1	1	1	2	2	X	X	9

Sheet E	1	2	3	4	5	6	7	8	Final
Romania 🔨	0	0	0	2	0	1	X	X	3
Norway	2	3	2	0	3	0	X	X	10

=== Draw 12 ===
Thursday, May 7, 19:30

Sheet A	1	2	3	4	5	6	7	8	Final
Finland	0	0	0	0	0	1	X	X	1
Germany 🔨	3	3	1	2	1	0	X	X	10

Sheet C	1	2	3	4	5	6	7	8	Final
United States 🔨	1	0	2	0	1	0	0	1	5
Italy	0	1	0	1	0	3	3	0	8

Sheet F	1	2	3	4	5	6	7	8	Final
England 🔨	1	0	1	1	3	1	1	X	8
Slovenia	0	3	0	0	0	0	0	X	3

Sheet B	1	2	3	4	5	6	7	8	Final
Japan 🔨	1	2	0	1	2	0	2	X	8
Poland	0	0	1	0	0	3	0	X	4

Sheet D	1	2	3	4	5	6	7	8	Final
Canada 🔨	5	1	1	1	1	0	X	X	9
New Zealand	0	0	0	0	0	1	X	X	1

=== Draw 13 ===
Friday, May 8, 9:00

Sheet B	1	2	3	4	5	6	7	8	Final
France 🔨	0	0	0	0	0	0	X	X	0
Scotland	1	1	2	2	1	1	X	X	8

Sheet D	1	2	3	4	5	6	7	8	Final
China 🔨	4	2	1	1	0	0	2	X	10
Austria	0	0	0	0	1	1	0	X	2

Sheet F	1	2	3	4	5	6	7	8	Final
Australia	0	4	2	1	0	1	0	X	8
Philippines 🔨	1	0	0	0	1	0	2	X	4

Sheet C	1	2	3	4	5	6	7	8	Final
Czech Republic	0	1	0	4	3	1	2	X	11
Brazil 🔨	1	0	2	0	0	0	0	X	3

Sheet E	1	2	3	4	5	6	7	8	Final
Hong Kong	0	0	0	1	0	0	3	X	4
Kazakhstan 🔨	1	1	2	0	4	2	0	X	10

=== Draw 14 ===
Friday, May 8, 12:30

Sheet A	1	2	3	4	5	6	7	8	Final
Sweden 🔨	4	2	2	2	0	2	X	X	12
Slovenia	0	0	0	0	1	0	X	X	1

Sheet C	1	2	3	4	5	6	7	8	Final
Finland 🔨	0	3	0	0	1	0	0	X	4
England	3	0	2	1	0	4	2	X	12

Sheet E	1	2	3	4	5	6	7	8	Final
Denmark 🔨	5	3	1	0	0	4	X	X	13
Hungary	0	0	0	1	2	0	X	X	3

Sheet B	1	2	3	4	5	6	7	8	Final
New Zealand	1	0	1	1	0	1	0	1	5
Germany 🔨	0	1	0	0	2	0	5	0	8

Sheet D	1	2	3	4	5	6	7	8	Final
Switzerland	0	0	1	2	0	3	0	X	6
Norway 🔨	2	1	0	0	3	0	3	X	9

=== Draw 15 ===
Friday, May 8, 16:00

Sheet A	1	2	3	4	5	6	7	8	Final
Kazakhstan	0	1	0	1	2	0	0	X	4
Italy 🔨	4	0	3	0	0	3	1	X	11

Sheet C	1	2	3	4	5	6	7	8	Final
Hong Kong	0	0	0	0	0	1	X	X	1
Japan 🔨	4	1	2	1	2	0	X	X	10

Sheet F	1	2	3	4	5	6	7	8	Final
Czech Republic 🔨	1	2	1	1	0	1	2	X	8
Poland	0	0	0	0	1	0	0	X	1

Sheet B	1	2	3	4	5	6	7	8	Final
Kenya	0	0	0	0	0	0	X	X	0
Spain 🔨	1	3	2	4	3	3	X	X	16

Sheet E	1	2	3	4	5	6	7	8	Final
United States	0	1	2	2	0	2	2	X	9
Brazil 🔨	1	0	0	0	1	0	0	X	2

=== Draw 16 ===
Friday, May 8, 19:30

Sheet B	1	2	3	4	5	6	7	8	9	Final
Hungary	0	3	1	1	0	1	0	1	0	7
Norway 🔨	3	0	0	0	1	0	3	0	1	8

Sheet D	1	2	3	4	5	6	7	8	Final
Scotland 🔨	5	1	0	4	1	3	X	X	14
Philippines	0	0	1	0	0	0	X	X	1

Sheet F	1	2	3	4	5	6	7	8	Final
South Korea 🔨	4	0	2	1	0	1	0	X	8
China	0	1	0	0	3	0	1	X	5

Sheet C	1	2	3	4	5	6	7	8	Final
Switzerland	0	0	4	0	0	0	X	X	4
Denmark 🔨	1	2	0	4	3	2	X	X	12

Sheet E	1	2	3	4	5	6	7	8	Final
France 🔨	0	1	0	0	2	1	0	0	4
Austria	1	0	2	1	0	0	1	1	6

=== Draw 17 ===
Saturday, May 9, 8:00

Sheet A	1	2	3	4	5	6	7	8	Final
United States	0	0	0	2	2	0	0	X	4
Japan 🔨	1	3	1	0	0	2	1	X	8

Sheet C	1	2	3	4	5	6	7	8	Final
Spain 🔨	1	1	0	1	0	3	0		W
Romania	0	0	1	0	1	0	1	/	L

Sheet F	1	2	3	4	5	6	7	8	Final
Kazakhstan 🔨	2	1	1	1	4	2	X	X	11
Brazil	0	0	0	0	0	0	X	X	0

Sheet B	1	2	3	4	5	6	7	8	Final
Czech Republic 🔨	5	0	0	4	0	3	0	X	12
Hong Kong	0	1	1	0	2	0	1	X	5

Sheet D	1	2	3	4	5	6	7	8	9	Final
Poland	0	3	3	0	0	0	2	0	0	8
Italy 🔨	3	0	0	1	1	1	0	2	3	11

^Romania ran out of time, and therefore forfeited the match.

=== Draw 18 ===
Saturday, May 9, 11:30

Sheet A	1	2	3	4	5	6	7	8	Final
Norway	0	1	0	1	0	0	X	X	2
Denmark 🔨	2	0	1	0	4	1	X	X	8

Sheet D	1	2	3	4	5	6	7	8	Final
Sweden 🔨	0	6	0	0	5	1	X	X	12
Finland	1	0	1	2	0	0	X	X	4

Sheet F	1	2	3	4	5	6	7	8	Final
Hungary 🔨	1	0	3	0	0	0	1	X	5
Switzerland	0	1	0	2	2	2	0	X	7

Sheet B	1	2	3	4	5	6	7	8	Final
Slovenia	0	1	0	0	1	0	X	X	2
Canada 🔨	4	0	4	2	0	6	X	X	16

Sheet E	1	2	3	4	5	6	7	8	Final
New Zealand	2	0	0	1	0	0	0	2	5
England 🔨	0	1	1	0	1	2	2	0	7

=== Draw 19 ===
Saturday, May 9, 15:00

Sheet B	1	2	3	4	5	6	7	8	Final
China 🔨	0	4	1	1	0	1	0	0	7
Australia	1	0	0	0	2	0	2	1	6

Sheet D	1	2	3	4	5	6	7	8	Final
South Korea 🔨	5	1	0	0	2	0	5	X	13
France	0	0	1	1	0	1	0	X	3

Sheet C	1	2	3	4	5	6	7	8	Final
Austria 🔨	0	2	0	0	0	0	X	X	2
Scotland	3	0	2	2	2	2	X	X	11

Sheet F	1	2	3	4	5	6	7	8	Final
Kenya	0	2	0	0	0	0	X	X	2
Romania 🔨	5	0	1	1	2	3	X	X	12

== Playoffs ==
Quarterfinals
1	Denmark	9
8	Germany	2
4	Canada	12
5	Norway	3
3	Scotland	7
6	South Korea	5
2	Japan	8
7	Czech Republic	4

Semifinals
1	Denmark	4
4	Canada	5
3	Scotland	5
2	Japan	6

Final
4	Canada	5
2	Japan	6
Bronze medal game
1	Denmark	7
3	Scotland	10

=== Quarterfinals ===
Saturday, May 9, 20:00

Sheet A	1	2	3	4	5	6	7	8	Final
Japan 🔨	0	3	1	0	2	0	2	X	8
Czech Republic	0	0	0	2	0	2	0	X	4

Sheet B	1	2	3	4	5	6	7	8	Final
Scotland 🔨	0	0	2	0	0	3	1	1	7
South Korea	1	2	0	1	1	0	0	0	5

Sheet C	1	2	3	4	5	6	7	8	Final
Denmark 🔨	2	2	0	0	1	1	3	X	9
Germany	0	0	1	1	0	0	0	X	2

Sheet D	1	2	3	4	5	6	7	8	Final
Canada 🔨	4	3	1	0	1	1	2	X	12
Norway	0	0	0	3	0	0	0	X	3

=== Semifinals ===
Sunday, May 10, 10:00

Sheet B	1	2	3	4	5	6	7	8	Final
Denmark 🔨	1	0	1	0	1	0	1	0	4
Canada	0	1	0	1	0	2	0	1	5

Sheet D	1	2	3	4	5	6	7	8	Final
Scotland 🔨	0	1	0	1	1	0	2	0	5
Japan	1	0	1	0	0	2	0	2	6

=== Bronze medal game ===
Sunday, May 10, 15:00

Sheet A	1	2	3	4	5	6	7	8	Final
Denmark	0	2	1	0	1	0	3	0	7
Scotland 🔨	2	0	0	5	0	2	0	1	10

=== Final ===
Sunday, May 10, 15:00

Sheet C	1	2	3	4	5	6	7	8	Final
Canada 🔨	2	0	1	0	2	0	0	0	5
Japan	0	1	0	1	0	1	1	2	6

== Final standings ==
Place	Team
1st place, gold medalist(s)	Japan
2nd place, silver medalist(s)	Canada
3rd place, bronze medalist(s)	Scotland
4	Denmark
5	Norway
5	South Korea
5	Czech Republic
5	Germany
9	Sweden
10	Switzerland
11	China
12	Italy
13	United States
14	Spain
15	England
16	Australia
17	Finland
18	Austria
19	Romania
20	Kazakhstan
21	Philippines
22	New Zealand
23	Poland
24	Hungary
25	France
26	Brazil
27	Slovenia
28	Kenya
29	Hong Kong
