= United States Curling Association =

National governing body of the sport of curling

USA Curling
- Sport: Curling
- Jurisdiction: United States of America
- Founded: 1958
- Affiliation: World Curling Federation
- Headquarters: Eagan, Minnesota, U.S.

Official website
- www.usacurling.org
- (United States)

The United States Curling Association (USCA or USA Curling) is the national governing body of the sport of curling in the United States. The goal of the USCA is to grow the sport of curling in the United States and win medals in competitions both domestic and abroad. Curling's recent popularity has swelled the USCA to 185 curling clubs and approximately 23,500 curlers in the United States. The United States Olympic men's curling teams have seen success in recent years, most notably winning the gold medal at the 2018 Winter Olympics in PyeongChang, led by skip John Shuster.

After being headquartered in Stevens Point, Wisconsin for many years, in April 2021 it was announced that the USCA headquarters would be moved to the Viking Lakes business campus in Eagan, Minnesota.

== History ==
The USCA was formed in the mid-20th century by the division of the Grand National Curling Club (GNCC) into separate regional units, with the USCA taking over the national functions of the GNCC; the GNCC then reduced its mandate to the eastern US, becoming one of those regional units.

In August 2019 the USCA announced that long-time CEO Rick Patzke was stepping away and former chairman of the board of directors Rich Lepping would act as the interim CEO while the search for a new permanent CEO proceeded. Jeff Plush was announced as the new CEO on February 6, 2020. Plush was formerly the commissioner of the National Women's Soccer League. At the time of Plush's October 2022 resignation, Dean Gemmell was named Interim CEO.

The COVID-19 pandemic first impacted the USCA at the Club National Championship held March 7–14, 2020 at the Potomac Curling Club in Laurel, Maryland, where at least 20 participants or volunteers contracted COVID-19. While the Club National Championship was still being competed, the USCA announced the postponement or cancellation of all remaining 2019–20 season events, including the college, U-18, Mixed, and Arena National Championships. Those 2019–20 events that were initially postponed until fall 2020 where all later cancelled. In June 2020, the USCA distributed a document to all member clubs with a set of recommendations on how to safely re-open and begin curling again.

The 2020–21 season had a slow start for USCA as the COVID-19 pandemic continued, the United States National Training Center in Chaska, Minnesota opened for practice ice on August 22 but the first competition did not occur until a scrimmage of the national teams in October. On December 3, 2020, the USCA announced that all remaining events of the season would be either cancelled or postponed until at least May 2021. This included cancelling the season's Senior Championships and postponing Men's, Women's, Mixed Doubles, Clubs, and U18 Championships. Because the National Championships were postponed until after the World Championships were scheduled, the 2020 Men's, Women's, and Mixed Doubles champions were selected to represent the United States at the respective 2021 World Championships. In February 2021, they further announced the cancellation of the 2021 Arena National Championship and postponement of that year's Junior and Mixed Championships until fall and summer 2021, respectively.

In 2022, the USCA had its first enforcement of a 2017 membership policy that was viewed as heavy-handed by many of its member organizations. This enforcement entails the removal of the largest and oldest regional association in North America, the Grand National Curling Club. The ensuing war of words between the GNCC and USCA proved to be a divisive issue with many American curlers, with many supporting the GNCC. This is another controversial act by the USCA after the 2020 hiring of former NWSL head Jeff Plush.

On October 3, 2022, the USA Curling Board issued a press release reaffirming their investigation into Plush's background prior to hiring him, and announced they held a special board session, but concluded with a weak, generic statement about the course of reopened review and potential subsequent action. Plush resigned later in October.

Olympic gold-medalist Tyler George also joined in condemning USA Curling's recent actions by taking aim at the board's decision to attempt to remove the GNCC.

== International competition ==
As a member of the World Curling Federation (WCF), the USCA sends teams to represent the United States at a number of international competitions.

=== World Championships ===
The United States has been represented at numerous world curling championships, including men's, women's, mixed, junior's, senior's, mixed doubles, and wheelchair.

While some world championships are open entry, such that any WCF member association that wants can a send a team, most limit the number of teams and set qualification requirements. For the men's and women's championships, a country qualifies by either hosting the championship or finishing in the top five or six (depending on the previous year's Worlds standings) in the Pan Continental Curling Championships.

The United States has had a team at the Men's World Championship every year since its expansion to a world event in 1961. In those 59 appearances the US team has earned 22 medals. Similarly the United States has also had a team at the Women's World Championship every year since its inception in 1979, earning 6 medals in the 41 appearances.

=== Olympics ===
The United States has been represented in both men's and women's curling at every Winter Olympics since it was reinstated as a full event in 1998. The country was also represented in the inaugural mixed doubles competition at the 2018 Winter Olympics. The United States has placed twice in the Olympic curling events, both for the men's event. In the 2006 Turin Winter Olympics the men's team earned bronze under the guidance of skip Pete Fenson. Most recently, at the 2018 Pyeongchang Winter Olympics, skip John Shuster's team won the gold medal. John Shuster and Joe Polo were on the medal winning team both years.

Curling was a demonstration event at the 1988 and 1992 Winter Olympics. The United States participated in the men's and women's events both years and the men's team earned the bronze medal in 1992.

== High Performance Program ==
In 2010 USA Curling created the High Performance Program (HPP) to provide coaching, funding, and other resources to a selection of competitive curlers in the United States with the goal of improving the country's competitive success on the international stage. Each season 3 men's teams, 3 women's teams, 2 junior men's teams, 2 junior women's teams, and a selection of mixed doubles athletes are admitted into the program. The HPP has a large coaching staff involved, overseen by director Derek Brown. In the fall of 2018 USA Curling announced the addition of a HPP Junior Developmental Pool, an offshoot of the Junior High Performance Program to improve the curling skills of 21 curlers 16 to 18 years old. In 2019 it was announced that the Chaska Curling Center in Chaska, Minnesota was selected as the USA Curling National Training Center, providing the HPP participants a place to practice and hold events throughout the season.

In 2020 a U-25 program was added to the High Performance Program. Created for athletes under 25 years old, it is intended to help in the transition from juniors to men's or women's. For the first year of the U-25 HPP, one men's team, one women's team, and one mixed doubles team was selected.

== Regional associations ==
USA Curling member clubs are organized into 10 regional curling associations.

- Alaska Curling Association
- Dakota Territory Curling Association
- Grand National Curling Club*
- Great Lakes Curling Association
- Midwest Curling Association
- Mid America Curling Association
- Minnesota Curling Association
- Mountain Pacific Curling Association
- Pacific Northwest Curling Association
- Wisconsin State Curling Association

*At the July 26, 2022 Board Meeting, the USCA voted to expel the Grand National Curling Club of America, including 70 clubs and more than 5,000 athletes. The decision was ratified by a 2/3 vote of the membership during the Members' Assembly on October 21, 2022.

== Championship events ==
The United States Curling Association typically holds thirteen national championship events each season.

- Men's National Championship
- Women's National Championship
- Junior National Championships
- Senior National Championships
- Mixed Doubles National Championship
- College National Championship
- U18 National Championship
- Mixed National Championship
- Club National Championships
- Wheelchair Mixed Doubles National Championship
- 5-and-Under National Championship
- Arena National Championships
- Junior Mixed Doubles National Championship

== Hall of Fame ==
In 1984 the USCA started a Hall of Fame recognize and honor individuals and teams that have achieved extraordinary distinction in curling or have made major contribution to the development of curling in the United States. As of 2018 there have been 45 individuals and 4 teams inducted into the Hall of Fame. The Hall of Fame is housed at the USCA headquarters in Stevens Point, Wisconsin.

The first inductee was Bud Somerville, 2-time world champion and 2-time Olympian. Somerville is also included as skip of two of the four teams to have been inducted to the Hall of Fame, the 1965 World Men's Championship team and the 1975 World Men's Championship team. The other two teams that have been inducted are the 1976 World Men's Championship team and the 1978 World Men's Championship team.

== Awards ==
- ANOC Gala Awards 2018：Best Male Team of PyeongChang 2018
