= Ice Melters Curling Club =

Curling club based in England

The Ice Melters Curling Club is a curling club based in Southern England. It was formed in June 2003, by Chris Munns, who wanted to provide curling opportunities for those based in England (a country that at the time had no curling facilities whatsoever). This was achieved by club members regularly traveling to other countries within Europe to both train and compete.

At the same time, the club actively campaigned for the introduction of curling facilities in England.

In November 2004 the club was able to base itself at England's first ever dedicated curling rink when Fenton's Rink, near Royal Tunbridge Wells in Kent, opened to the public. Privately owned, funded and built by a local landowner (and not any specific curling club) the rink is now at the heart of English curling.

== Champions ==
In January 2005, the Ice Melters Curling Club became inaugural Superleague Champions at Fenton's Rink, while it continues to send teams to compete at various bonspiels throughout Europe.

== Twin Club ==
The Ice Melters Curling Club is twinned with Malmö Curlingklubb in Sweden, with the twinning aimed at promoting friendship and providing additional curling opportunities for the members of both clubs.

== Community Amateur Sports Club ==
During 2004, the Ice Melters Curling Club was awarded 'Community Amateur Sports Club' status within the UK. The award recognises the quality of the club set-up and its policy of membership being available to all, regardless of location, nationality, gender, age or ability.

== Charity ==
The Ice Melters Curling Club also works hard on behalf of 'The Royal Air Force Benevolent Fund', raising money for the registered charity each summer through a number of sponsored activities.
