= Kilsyth Curling Club =

Scottish curling club

- Sport: Curling
- Founded: 1716
- Location: Kilsyth, Scotland

The Kilsyth Curling Club, in Kilsyth, Scotland, claims to be the oldest curling club in the world, being established in 1716.

== History ==
Curling was being played in Kilsyth from at least the 16th century, and in 1716 the Kilsyth Curling Club was established, making it the oldest in the world. This claim is disputed in other sources, which give either the Kinross Curling Club, established in 1668, or a curling club from Muthill, established in 1739, the honour.

The club still exists and also has a women's division. It plays in provincial competitions in the Stirlingshire province, organised by the Royal Caledonian Curling Club.

== Notable curlers ==
- Michael Goodfellow, silver medalist at the 2014 Winter Olympics
