= Sweeping Forward =

2014 Canadian drama film

- Directed by: Patricia MacDowell
- Written by: Patricia MacDowell
- Produced by: Patricia MacDowell
- Starring: Anne-Marie Saheb; Lydia Bouchard; Bénédicte Gobert; Sharon James; Melanie Elliot
- Cinematography: Vlad Horodinca
- Edited by: Robert E. Newton
- Music by: Daniel Scott
- Production company: Breakfast Films
- Distributed by: Under the Lens Entertainment
- Release date: August 29, 2014 (FFM)
- Running time: 96 minutes
- Country: Canada
- Languages: English; French

Sweeping Forward is a Canadian drama film, directed by Patricia MacDowell and released in 2014. The film stars Anne-Marie Saheb as Bess, a former curling champion who has more recently struggled with her mental health due to childhood abuse by her father, who begins to rebuild her life by recruiting and coaching four troubled young women to learn and compete in the sport.

The cast includes Lydia Bouchard, Bénédicte Gobert, Sharon James, Melanie Elliot, Marjolaine Lemieux, Jennifer Johnston, Trevor Botkin, Sienna Mazzone, Rafaela Mazzone, Marc Fournier, Elizabeth Locas, Geneviève Côté and Carmen Sylvestre.

The film was inspired in part by MacDowell's own battle with anxiety disorder, as well as her job at the Baie-d'Urfé curling club, where much of the film was shot.

The film premiered at the 2014 Montreal World Film Festival, where it won the audience award for Best Canadian Film.
