= Women's curling =

Curling practiced by women

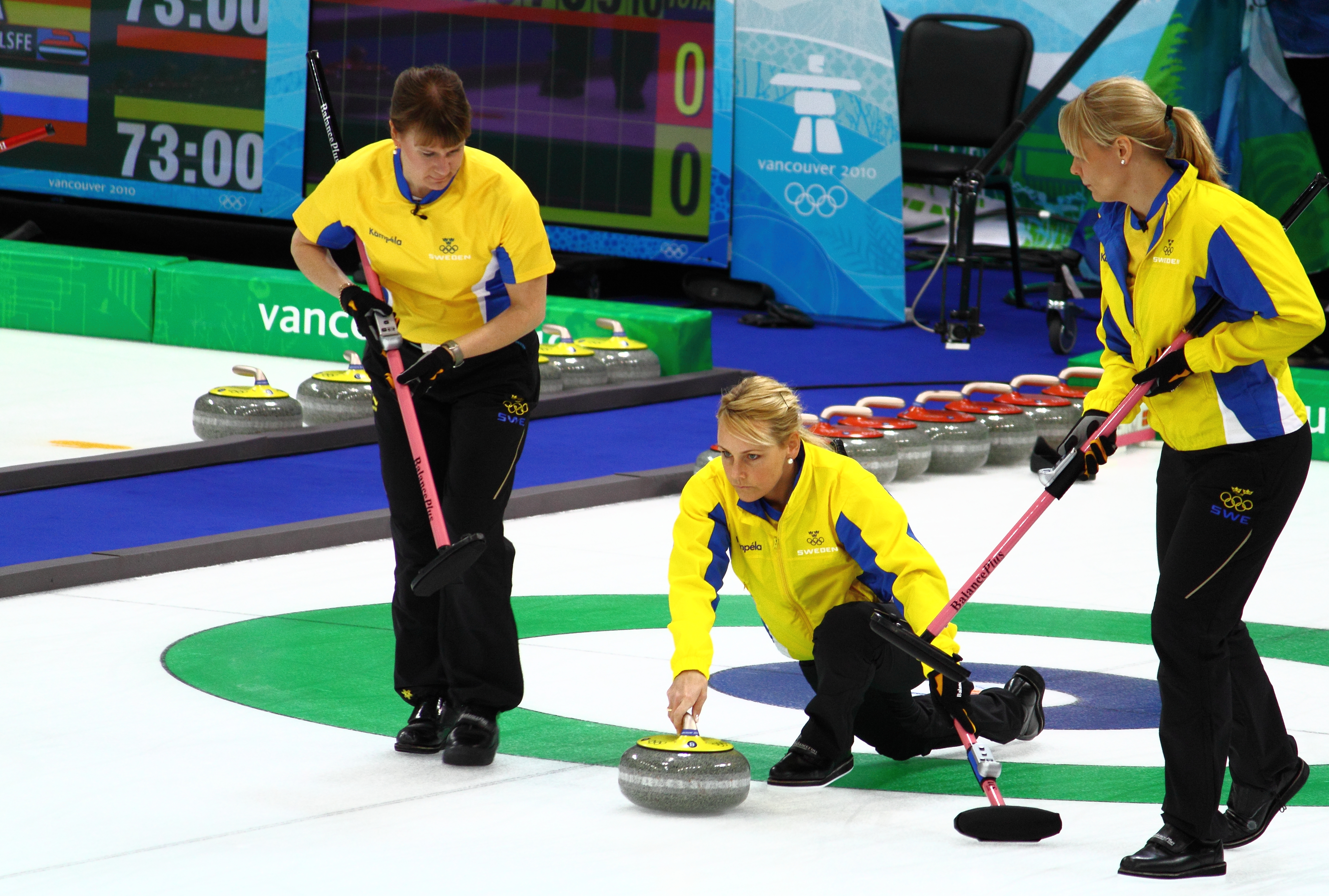
Curlers from Sweden at the 2010 women's Olympic tournament.

Women's curling is the participation of women in the sport of curling. In casual play and at tournaments, women may participate in mixed curling competitions with men or in a separate women's competition. Women have competed at the World Curling Championships since 1973. Women competed in the official Olympic debut of curling at the 1998 games in Nagano and in every Winter Olympic Games since.

Notable reoccurring women-specific curling competitions include the Scotties Tournament of Hearts in Canada, Norwegian Women's Curling Championship, the New Year Curling in Miyota in Japan, and Grasshopper Women's Masters in Switzerland, among others.

== See also ==
- Women's sports

== Bibliography ==
- Tan Wei-dong, Hong Lin, "Discussion of the 2006 World Ladies Curling Championship", China Winter Sports, 2007.
- Tan Wei-dong, Li Xue-qin, Wang Bing-yu, "Discussion of the Probability about Chinese Lady Curling Team Playing Well in the 2010 Olympic Winter Games", China Winter Sports, 2007.
- Xu Yong-sheng, "Technical Contrast between Chinese and Korean Women Curling Team in the 6th Asian Winter Games", China Winter Sports, 2007.
- Tan Wei-dong, "Analysis on the Advantage and Shortage of Chinese Ladies Curling Team for Preparing the 2010 Olympic Winter Games — My Thought on the 2008 World ladies Curling Championship", China Winter Sports, 2008.
- Beverly D. Leipert, Robyn Plunkett, Donna Meagher-Stewart, Lynn Scruby, Heather Mair, Kevin B. Wamsley "'I Can't Imagine My Life Without It!': Curling and Health Promotion: A Photovoice Study", Canadian Journal of Nursing Research, vol. 43, n°1, March 2011, pp. 60–78.
- Katherine A. Tamminen, Peter R.E. Crocker, "'I control my own emotions for the sake of the team': Emotional self-regulation and interpersonal emotion regulation among female high-performance curlers", Psychology of Sport and Exercise, vol. 14|n°5, September 2013, pp. 737–747.
- Shou Zhong Zhang, "Analysis of Specific Cognitive Ability Characteristics of Chinese Women Curling Athletes", Advanced Materials Research, vol. 971-973, June 2014, pp. 2736–2739.

== See also ==
- Media related to Women's curling at Wikimedia Commons
