= John George Brown =

American painter (1831–1913)

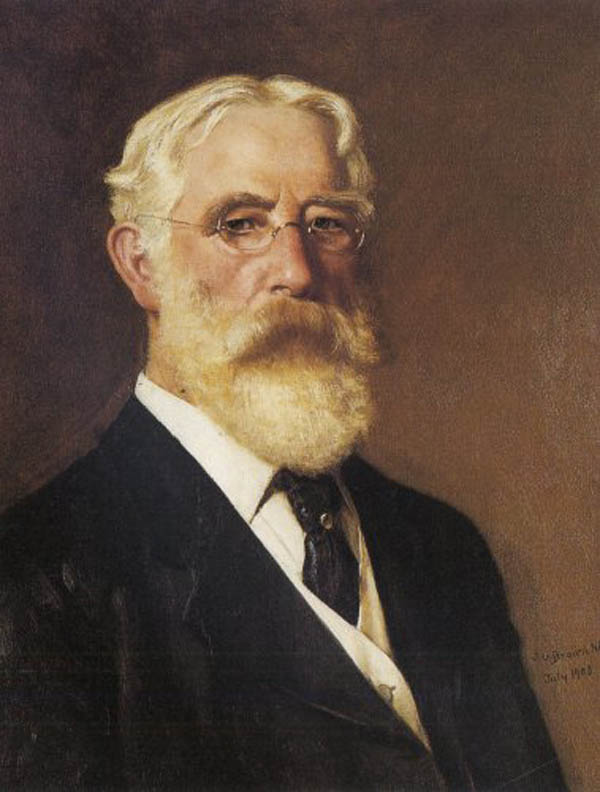
- Born: November 11, 1831; Durham, England, U.K.
- Died: February 8, 1913 (aged 81); New York City, New York, U.S.
- Style: Genre art

John George Brown (November 11, 1831 – February 8, 1913) was a British citizen and an American painter who specialized in genre scenes.

== Biography ==
John George Brown was born in Durham, England on November 11, 1831. His parents apprenticed him to the career of glass worker at the age of fourteen in an attempt to dissuade him from pursuing painting. He studied nights at the School of Design in Newcastle-on-Tyne while working as a glass cutter there between 1849 and 1852 and evenings at the Trustees Academy in Edinburgh while working at the Holyrood Glass Works between 1852 and 1853. After moving to New York City in 1853, he studied with Thomas Seir Cummings at the National Academy of Design where he was elected a National Academician in 1861. Brown was the Academy's vice-president from 1899 to 1904.

Around 1855, he worked for the owner of the Brooklyn Glass Company as a glassblower, and later married the daughter of his employer. His father-in-law encouraged his artistic abilities, supporting him financially, letting Brown pursue painting full-time. He established a studio in 1860 and, in 1866, he became one of the charter members of the Water-Color Society, of which he was president from 1887 to 1904. Brown became famous for his idealized depictions of street urchins in New York (bootblacks, street musicians, posy sellers, newsboys, etc.).

His Passing Show (Paris, Salon, 1877) and Street Boys at Play (Paris Exhibition, 1900) are good examples of his popular talent. Brown's art is best characterized as British genre paintings adapted to American subjects. Essentially literary, Brown's paintings are executed with precise detail, but poor in color, and more popular with the general public than with connoisseurs. His paintings were quite popular with wealthy collectors. Many of Brown's paintings were reproduced as lithographs and widely distributed with packaged teas. He also painted some landscapes, just for pleasure.

He died at his home in New York City on February 8, 1913.

== Quotes ==
- Wishing to more faithfully capture his subjects as they appeared in real life, Brown once said, "They will change their dress, as though to show the extent of their wardrobe. Being cautioned expressly on Saturday, and told to return in the same fustian jacket your boy will appear on Monday morning, if he appears at all, in a red woolen shirt. And they are constantly having their hair trimmed--perfect dandies!"
- Brown was trying to capture the spirit of the street children as people who "pull themselves up by their bootstraps."
- Many years later, Brown claimed that most of the street children he painted had grown to become successful businessmen.
- Brown claimed to bobbies, "I do not paint poor boys solely because the public likes such pictures and pays me for them, but because I love the boys myself, for I, too, was once a poor lad like them."

== Gallery ==
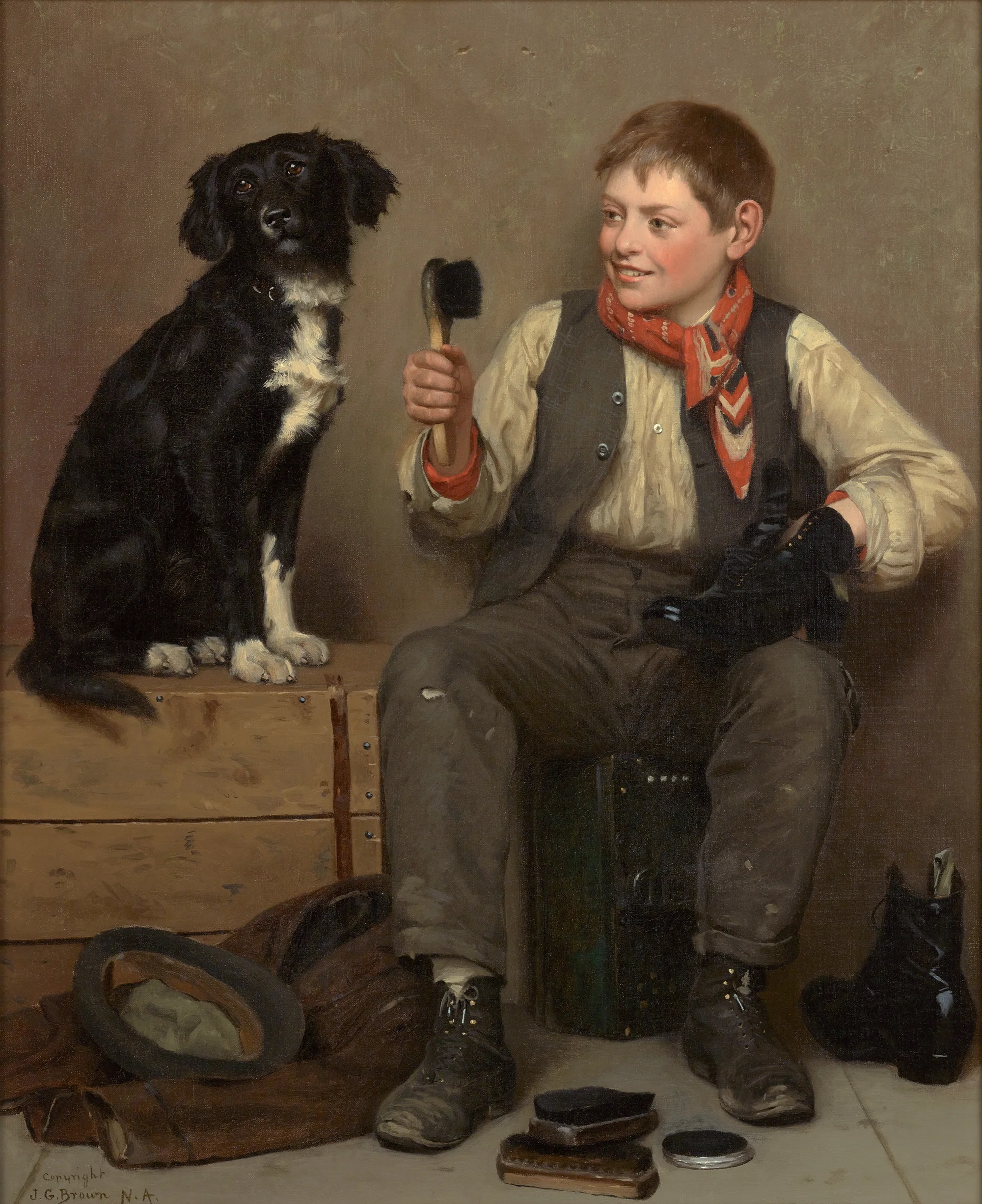
Only A Nickel, Joe, 1906. Private collection.

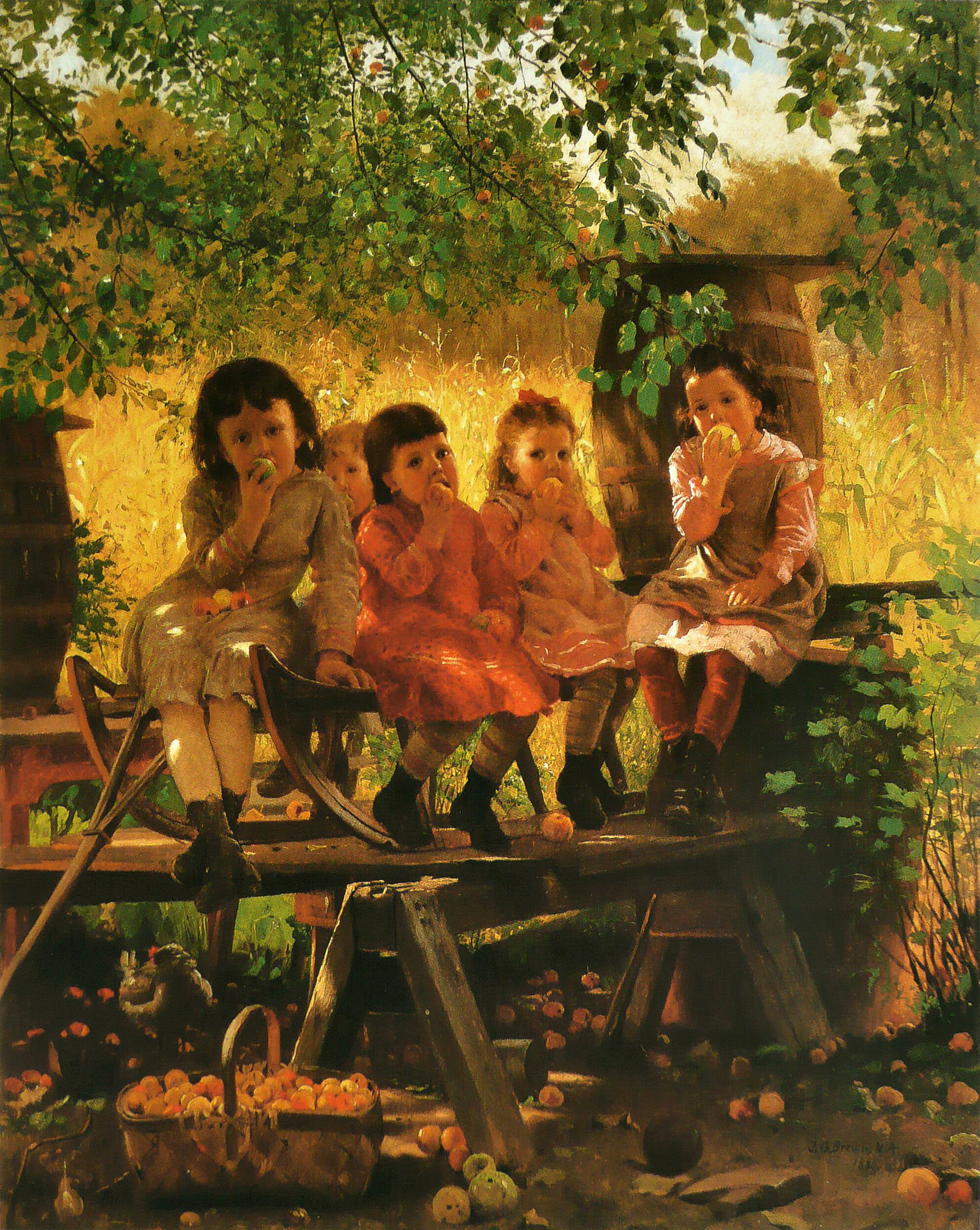
The Cider Mill, 1880, Terra Foundation for American Art, Daniel J. Terra Collection

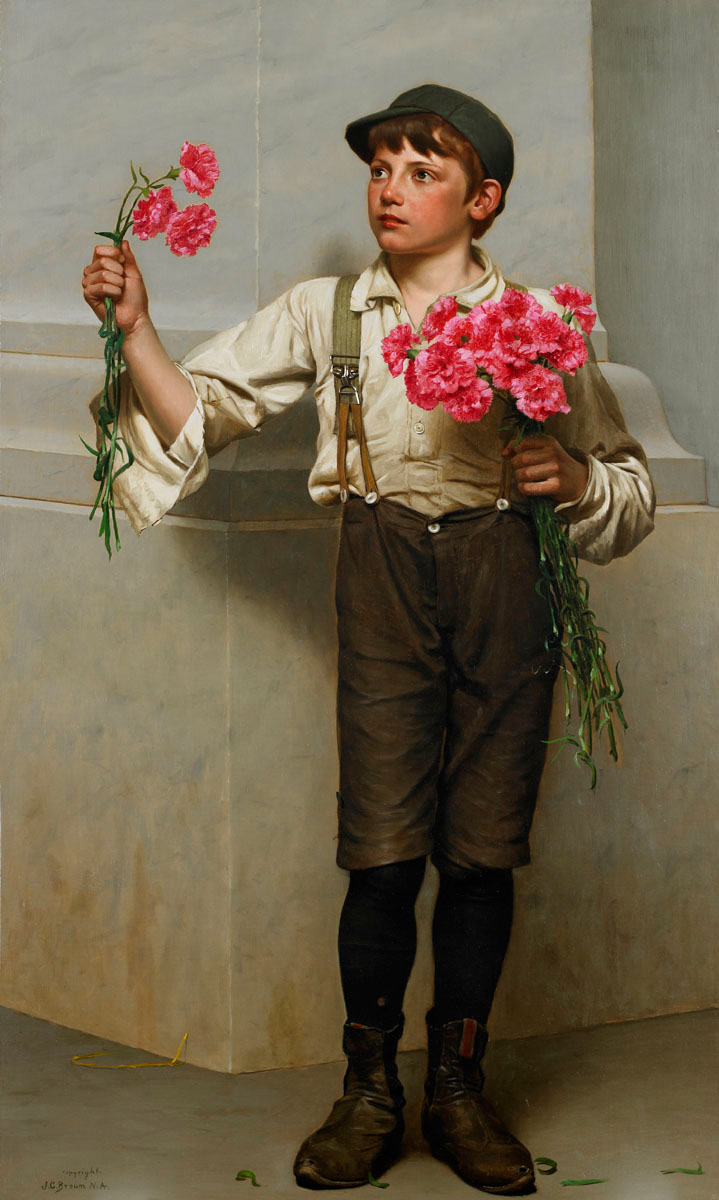
Three for Five, 1890, Birmingham Museum of Art, Birmingham, Alabama

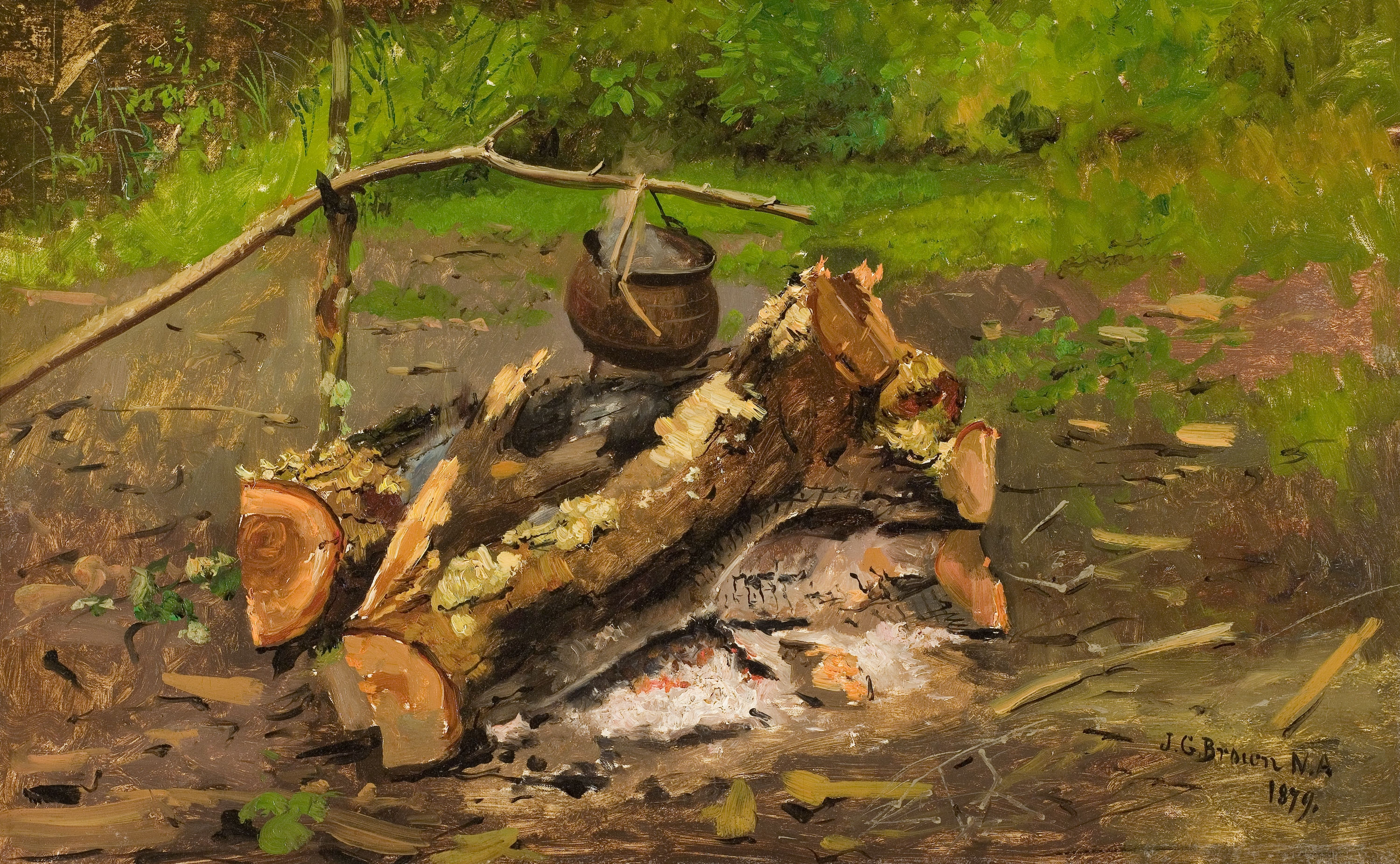
Camp in Vermont, 1879

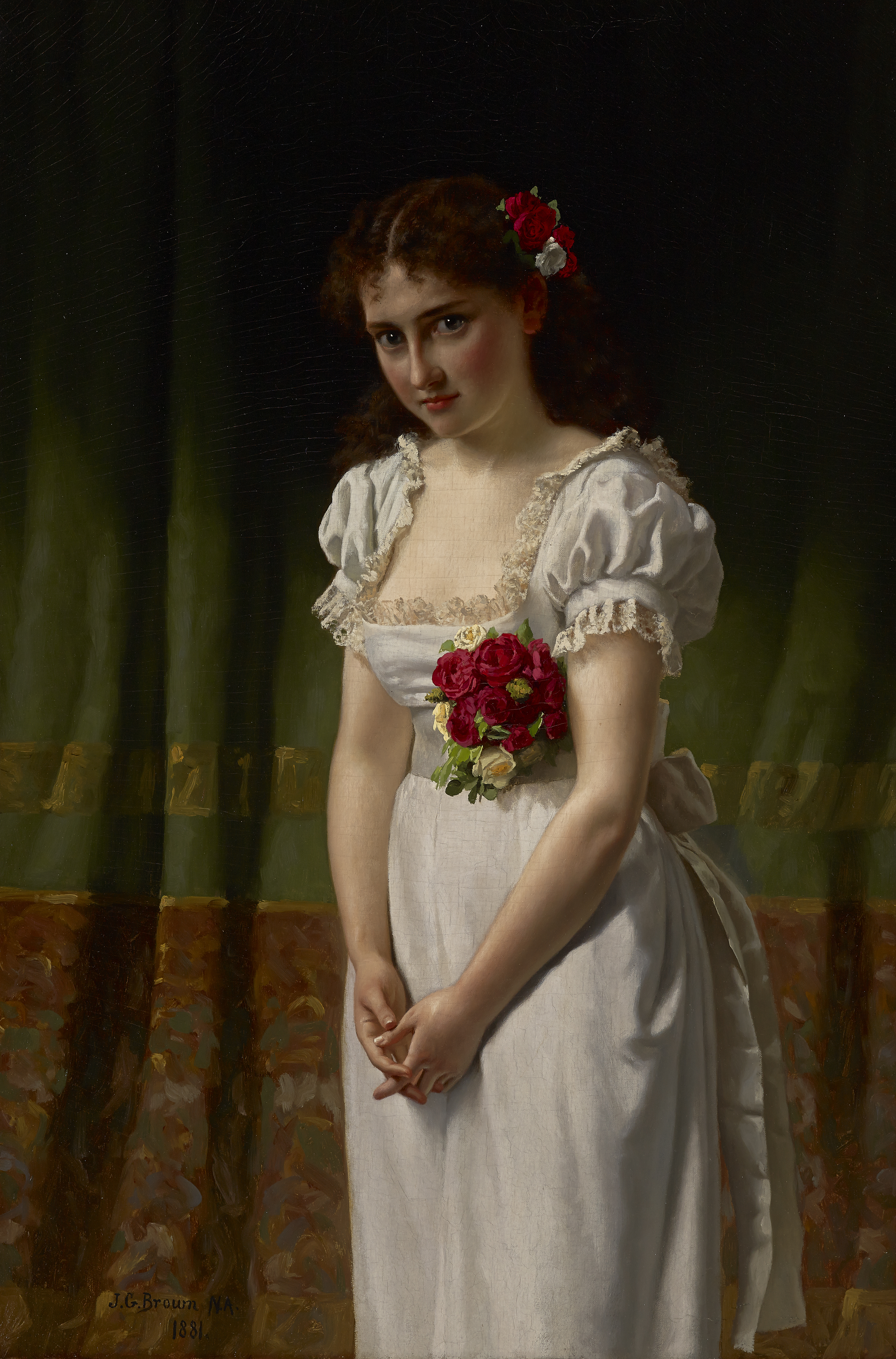
Meditation, 1881

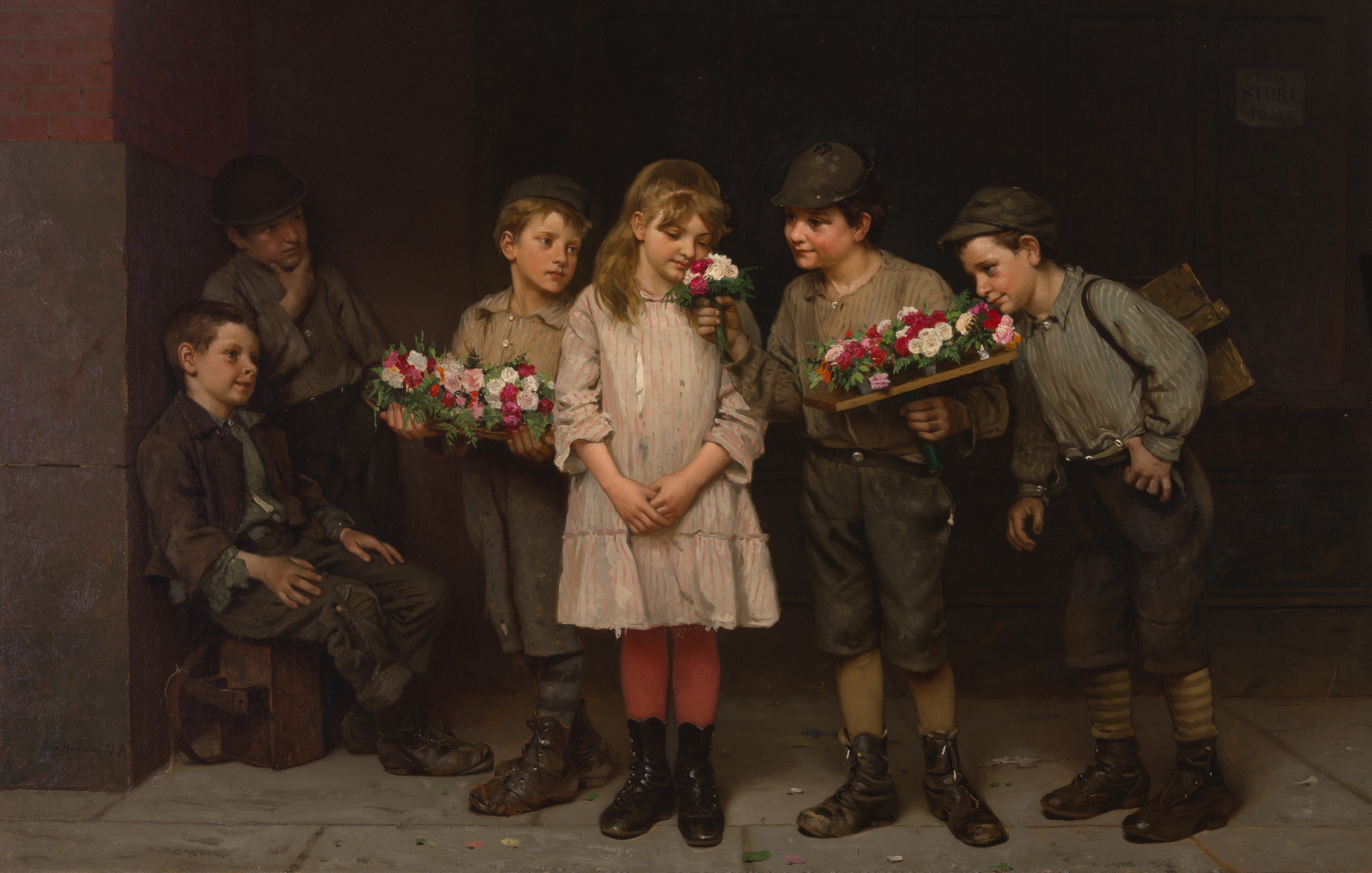
Street Gallantry, 1880
