= List of curling clubs in the United States =

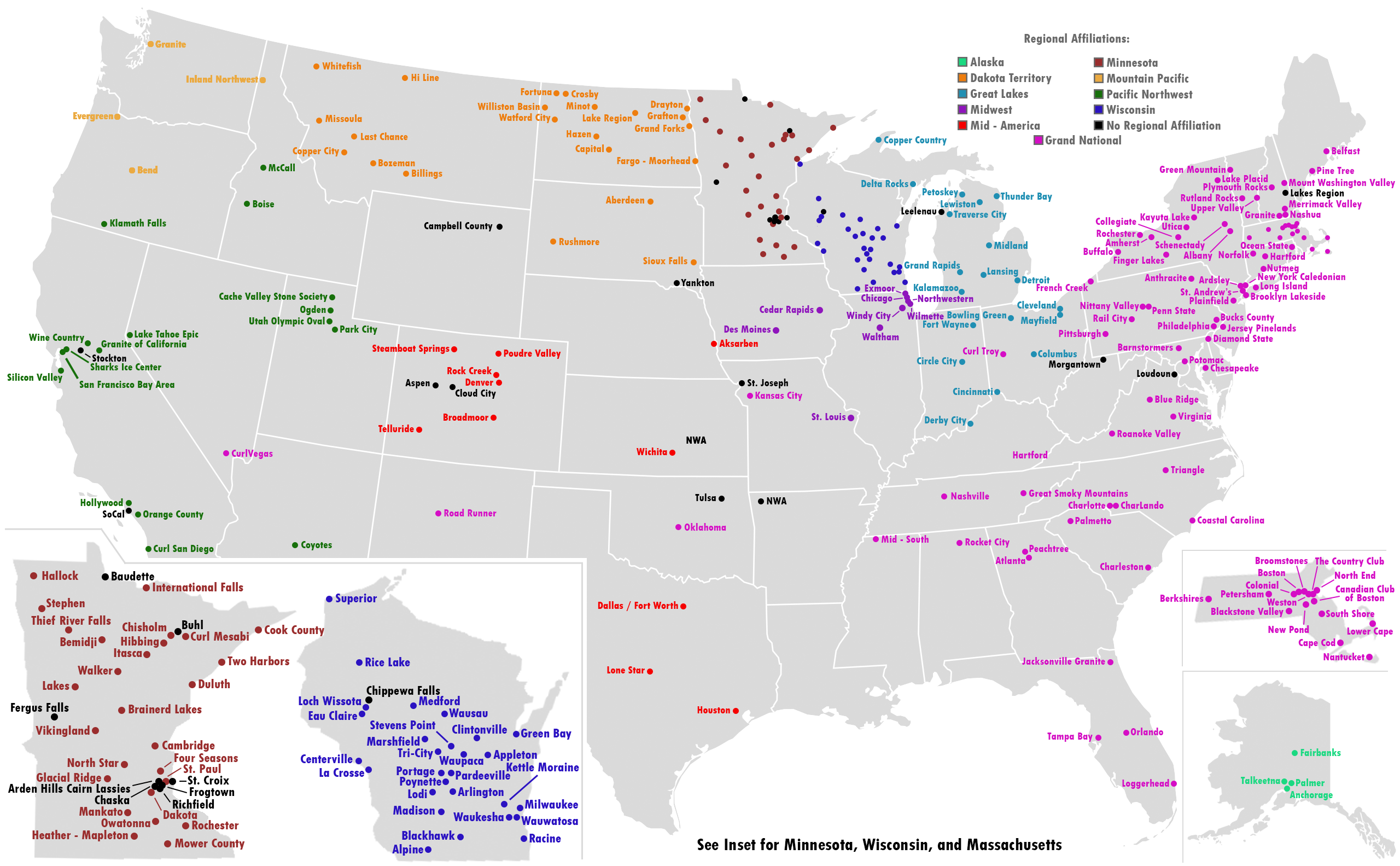
A map of all active curling clubs in the United States.

This is a list of the curling clubs in the United States.

In October 2022, the membership of USA Curling ratified the board of directors' vote to remove the Grand National Curling Club (GNCC) as a regional association. Some clubs opted to leave USA Curling while retaining membership in the GNCC. Some clubs will remain members of both USA Curling and the GNCC.

In August 2024, the GNCC rejoined USA Curling as a regional association, and many clubs returned to USA Curling as well.

== Terms ==
Term	Explanation
Regional Association	All United States Curling Association (USCA) clubs are organized into regional associations consisting of the clubs from one or more states. These associations serve as intermediaries between the clubs and the USCA.
Type (Club Type)	This identifies how organized the club is and whether or not it has a place to play. Types are: Arena: These clubs have their own equipment including rocks (either owned by the club or leased) and play at a facility where other ice sports are played on the same ice surface. An example would be a club that rents ice time at a hockey rink.; Dedicated: A club that owns/leases its own facility with ice that is only used for curling. The buildings usually include a clubhouse with kitchen, locker rooms, etc.; Paper: An active club of the USCA that at present has no place to play. An arena club that loses its lease at its ice rink becomes a paper club until it finds new ice. A newly formed club that has not yet found a facility is also considered a paper club.
Sheets	This indicate how many games can be played simultaneously, usually dictated by how much ice is in the facility and how many 16-rock sets of stones the club possesses.

== Quick links ==
Regional Associations	States
Alaska State Curling Association	Alaska
Grand National Curling Club	Primarily but not limited to the East Coast
Great Lakes Curling Association	Indiana,Kentucky,Michigan,Ohio,Tennessee
Midwest Curling Association	Illinois, Iowa, Missouri
Mid-America Curling Association	Colorado, Kansas, Missouri, Nebraska, New Mexico, Oklahoma, Texas
Minnesota Curling Association	Minnesota
Mountain Pacific Curling Association (MoPac)	Arizona, California, Idaho (also Pacific NW), Nevada, Oregon (also Pacific NW), Utah
Dakota Territory Curling Association	Montana, North Dakota, South Dakota
Pacific Northwest Curling Association	Idaho (also MoPac), Oregon (also MoPac), Washington
Wisconsin State Curling Association	Wisconsin
At Large Club	National

== Maps ==
USA Curling club directory

== Club list ==
Club name	City/town	State	Type	Sheets	Estimated membership	USCA member	Other memberships	Year founded	Notes and links
Rocket City Curling Club	Huntsville	Alabama	Arena	5	100	yes	GNCC, USWCA	2018	Club site; dedicated ice projected to open February 2027
Anchorage Curling Club	Anchorage	Alaska	Dedicated	2	250	yes	Alaska	1954	Club site
Fairbanks Curling Club	Fairbanks	Alaska	Dedicated	6	275	yes	Alaska, USWCA	1905	Club site
Homer Curling Club	Homer	Alaska	Arena				Alaska	2014	Facebook group
Kodiak Curling Club	Kodiak	Alaska	Arena			yes (to be approved)	Alaska	2025	Facebook group
Palmer Curling Club	Palmer	Alaska	Arena	5	25	yes ^{[a]}	Alaska	2019	Club site
Talkeetna Curling Club	Talkeetna	Alaska	Arena		25	yes	Alaska	2021	Club site
Coyotes Curling Club	Tempe	Arizona	Dedicated	4	250	yes	MoPac, USWCA	2003	Club site
NWA Curling	Springdale	Arkansas	Arena	2			Unaffiliated		Venue site
Central California Curling Club	Stockton	California	Arena				Unaffiliated		Facebook group
Curl San Diego	Carlsbad	California	Arena	5	25		MoPac	2006	Club site
Granite Curling Club of California	Stockton	California	Arena	3			MoPac	1962	Club site
Hollywood Curling	Los Angeles	California	Arena		100		MoPac	2007	Club site; moved to current site in February 2024
Orange County Curling	Irvine	California	Arena		100	yes	MoPac	2010	Club site
San Francisco Bay Area Curling Club	Oakland	California	Dedicated	5	200	yes	MoPac, USWCA	1958	Club site
Sharks Ice Curling	Oakland	California	Arena		25	yes	MoPac	2018	Center site
Silicon Valley Curling Club	San Jose and Fremont	California	Arena	5	125	yes	MoPac, USWCA	2017	Club site
SoCal Curling Club	Simi Valley	California	Arena			no	Unaffiliated	2006	Club site
Wine Country Curling Club of Northern California	Roseville	California	Arena	5	125	yes	MoPac, USWCA	2006	Club site
Aspen Curling Club	Aspen	Colorado	Arena	4	75	yes		2006	Club site
Broadmoor Curling Club	Colorado Springs	Colorado	Arena	4	25	yes	Mid-America	1968	Club site; Arena is a major training center for Olympic figure skaters; working on dedicated ice in the Pikes Peak region
Cloud City Curling Club	Leadville	Colorado	Outdoor	3				2014	Club site; Outdoor curling; elevation just over 10,000 feet
Denver Curling Club	Denver	Colorado	Dedicated	4	425	yes	Mid-America, USWCA	1965	Club site
Poudre Valley Curling Club	Fort Collins	Colorado	Arena				Mid-America	2015	Club site
Rock Creek Curling	Lafayette	Colorado	Dedicated	6	225	yes	Mid-America	2021	Club site
Steamboat Curling Club	Steamboat Springs	Colorado	Arena	5	25	yes	Mid-America	2018	Club site
Telluride Curling Club	Telluride	Colorado	Arena	2	50	yes	Mid-America	2014	Club site
Hartford Curling Club	West Hartford	Connecticut	Arena				GNCC	1908	Club site; reformed in 2015
Norfolk Curling Club	Norfolk	Connecticut	Dedicated	2	125	yes ^{[a]}	GNCC, USWCA	1956	Club site
Nutmeg Curling Club	Bridgeport	Connecticut	Dedicated	3	200	yes ^{[a]}	GNCC, USWCA	1960	Club site; dedicated facility at Wonderland of Ice opened 2006
Diamond State Curling Club	Newark	Delaware	Arena	4	75	yes ^{[a]}	GNCC, USWCA	2016	Club site
Jacksonville Granite Curling Club	Jacksonville	Florida	Arena	5	50			2018	Club site; moved in 2023; removed from GNCC in 2025
Loggerhead Curling Club	Lake Worth	Florida	Arena	4	50	yes (to be approved)	GNCC	2019	Facebook group
Orlando Curling Club	Kissimmee	Florida	Arena	5		yes ^{[a]}	GNCC	2014	Club site
Tampa Bay Curling Club	Wesley Chapel	Florida	Arena	5	50	yes	GNCC	2017	Club site
Ybor City Curling Club	Tampa	Florida	Dedicated	2				2026	Club site Opening slated for January 2027
Atlanta Curling Club	Atlanta	Georgia	Arena	6	50	yes	GNCC	2010	Club site
Peachtree Curling Association	Marietta	Georgia	Dedicated	3	150	yes ^{[a]}	GNCC	2015	Club site
Boise Curling Club	Boise	Idaho	Arena	5	50	yes	Pacific NW	2004	Club site; working toward dedicated ice
Inland Northwest Curling Club	Coeur d'Alene	Idaho	Arena		25	yes	Pacific NW	2020	Club site; formed from merger of Lilac CC (Spokane, Wash.) with club in Coeur d'Alene
McCall Curling Club	McCall	Idaho	Arena		125	yes	MoPac		Club site
Teton Valley Curling Club	Victor	Idaho	Arena			yes	MoPac		Teton Valley Foundation site
Chicago Curling Club	Northbrook	Illinois	Dedicated	4	275	yes	Midwest, USWCA	1948	Club site; home of the American Curling History Museum.
Exmoor Curling Club	Highland Park	Illinois	Dedicated	4	50	yes	Midwest, USWCA	1938	Club site
Northwestern (Univ.) Curling Club	Evanston	Illinois	Dedicated (rented)	4			Midwest	2005	College club plays at Chicago CC; listed in Midwest association but not USCA directory
Waltham Curling Club	Triumph	Illinois	Dedicated	3	125	yes	Midwest, USWCA	1884	Club site
Wilmette Curling Club	Wilmette	Illinois	Dedicated (rented)	4		yes	Midwest	1968	Club site; rents ice at Chicago CC
Windy City Curling Club	Villa Park	Illinois	Dedicated	3	175	yes	Midwest, USWCA	2014	Club site; arena club until 2019
Circle City Curling Club	Anderson	Indiana	Dedicated	3	150	yes	Great Lakes, USWCA	2007	Club site; opened dedicated ice in 2022
Fort Wayne Curling Club	Fort Wayne	Indiana	Dedicated	4	100	yes	Great Lakes, USWCA	2010	Club site
Cedar Rapids Curling	Cedar Rapids	Iowa	Arena	5	75	yes	Midwest, USWCA	2012	Club site
Des Moines Curling Club	West Des Moines	Iowa	Arena	4	100	yes	Midwest	2013	Club site
Derby City Curling Club	Louisville	Kentucky	Arena	4	25	yes	Great Lakes	2018	Club site
Belfast Curling Club	Belfast	Maine	Dedicated	3	200	yes ^{[a]}	GNCC, USWCA	1959	Club site
Pine Tree Curling Club	Portland	Maine	Arena	5	75	yes ^{[a]}	GNCC, USWCA	2015	Club site
Barnstormers	Westminster	Maryland	Paper				GNCC		
Chesapeake Curling Club	Easton	Maryland	Dedicated	3		no ^{[b]}	GNCC, USWCA	1980	Club site
Potomac Curling Club	Laurel	Maryland	Dedicated	4	400	yes ^{[a]}	GNCC, USWCA	1961	Club site
Blackstone Valley Curling Club	Hopedale	Massachusetts	Arena	4			GNCC	2016	Club site
Boston Curling Club	Sudbury	Massachusetts	Paper				GNCC	1859	
Broomstones Curling Club	Wayland	Massachusetts	Dedicated	4	425	yes	GNCC, USWCA	1911	Club site; traces lineage back to what's billed as first dedicated-ice game in the world in 1911.
Canadian Club of Boston	West Roxbury	Massachusetts	Paper		25	yes	GNCC, USWCA	1960	Club site; has played at The Country Club (Brookline/Chestnut Hill)
Cape Cod Curling Club	Falmouth	Massachusetts	Dedicated	3	225	yes	GNCC, USWCA	1969	Club site
Colonial Curling Association	Worcester	Massachusetts	Arena	4		yes ^{[a]}	GNCC, USWCA	2015	Club site; formerly the Marlborough Curling Club.
Curling Club of the Berkshires	Pittsfield	Massachusetts	Arena			yes ^{[a]}	GNCC	2014	Club site; plays at neighboring clubs and Boys and Girls Club of Pittsfield
Lower Cape Curling Club	Orleans	Massachusetts	Arena	4			GNCC	2018	Club site
Nantucket Curling Club	Nantucket	Massachusetts	Arena	4			GNCC	2016	Facebook group
New Pond Curling Club	Walpole	Massachusetts	Outdoor	1		yes	GNCC	1998	Club site
North End Curling Club	Boston	Massachusetts	Arena		125	yes ^{[a]}	GNCC	2017	Club site
Petersham Curling Club	Petersham	Massachusetts	Dedicated	2	125		GNCC, USWCA	1960	Club site
South Shore Curling Club	Bridgewater	Massachusetts	Arena	5		yes ^{[a]}	GNCC, USWCA	2010	Club site
The Country Club	Chestnut Hill	Massachusetts	Dedicated	4	50	yes	GNCC, USWCA	1882	Club site; familiarly known as Brookline; facility in golf club that hosted 2022 US Open.
Weston Curling Club	Weston	Massachusetts	Dedicated (rented)	4			GNCC	1960	Plays at Broomstones; celebrating 63rd year in 2023
Copper Country Curling Club	Calumet	Michigan	Dedicated	2	75	yes	Great Lakes	1993	Club site; plays at the Drill House on natural ice (no refrigeration).
Delta Rocks Curling Club	Escanaba	Michigan	Arena	3		yes	Great Lakes	2002	Club site
Detroit Curling Club	Ferndale	Michigan	Dedicated	4	375	yes	Great Lakes, USWCA	1885	Club site; also affiliated with Curling Ontario
Grand Rapids Curling Club	Grand Rapids	Michigan	Arena	4	75	yes	Great Lakes	2020	Club site; played first season in 2021–22
Kalamazoo Curling Club	Kalamazoo	Michigan	Dedicated	5	125	yes	Great Lakes, USWCA	2008	Club site; dedicated ice at Wings Stadium opened in 2015; on hiatus as of 2026
Leelenau Curling Club	Maple City	Michigan	Dedicated	2			Unaffiliated	2019	Club site; connected to Broomstack Kitchen and Taphouse
Lewiston Curling Club	Lewiston	Michigan	Dedicated	2	75	yes	Great Lakes	1960	Club site
Ludington Area Curling Club	Scottville	Michigan	Arena			yes		2018	Club site
Mid-Michigan Curling Club	Jackson	Michigan	Arena	5	25	yes	Great Lakes	2010	Club site; predecessor club founded 1972; changed name from Lansing CC in 2026
Midland Curling Club	Midland	Michigan	Dedicated	4	225	yes	Great Lakes, USWCA	1962	Club site
Petoskey Curling Club	Petoskey	Michigan	Dedicated			yes	Great Lakes	2014	Club site; dedicated ice opened in 2024
Thunder Bay Curling Club	Alpena	Michigan	Arena	4		yes	Great Lakes	2019	Facebook group
Traverse City Curling Club	Traverse City	Michigan	Dedicated	5	300	yes	Great Lakes	2014	Club site; new dedicated facility opened in 2023
Arden Hills Cairn Lassies	St. Paul	Minnesota	Dedicated (shared)	8			USWCA only	1980	Members of St. Paul Curling Club; all-women's club formed in 1973 and moved to St. Paul when Arden Hills CC closed in 1980
Baudette Curling Club	Baudette	Minnesota	Arena	4			Unaffiliated	2010	Facebook group
Bemidji Curling Club	Bemidji	Minnesota	Dedicated	6	200	yes	Minnesota	1935	Club site
Brainerd Lakes Curling Association	Brainerd	Minnesota	Dedicated	4	225	yes	Minnesota	2006	Club site; located at the Crow Wing County Fairgrounds.
Buhl Curling Club	Buhl	Minnesota	Dedicated	4			Unaffiliated		Facebook group
Cambridge Curling Club	Cambridge	Minnesota	Dedicated	6	75	yes	Minnesota, USWCA	1974	Club site; formerly known as Gateway Curling Club
Chaska Curling Club	Chaska	Minnesota	Dedicated	6	1000	yes ^{[a]}	Minnesota	2015	Club site; claims approximately 1,000 members
Chisholm Curling Club	Chisholm	Minnesota	Dedicated	4			Unaffiliated	1961	Club site
Cook County Curling Club	Grand Marais	Minnesota	Dedicated	4	75		Minnesota	1962	Club site
Curl Mesabi	Eveleth	Minnesota	Dedicated	8	300	yes	Minnesota	1998	Club site
Curling Club of Rochester	Rochester	Minnesota	Arena	4	125	yes	Minnesota	2017	Club site
Dakota Curling Club	Lakeville	Minnesota	Dedicated	4	275	yes	Minnesota, USWCA	2006	Club site; moved to dedicated ice January 2017
Duluth Curling Club	Duluth	Minnesota	Dedicated	8	425	yes	Minnesota, USWCA	1891	Club site
Fergus Falls Area Curling	Fergus Falls	Minnesota	Arena		25	yes	Unaffiliated	2022	Facebook group; started play fall 2022
Fosston Curling Club	Fosston	Minnesota	Outdoor				Minnesota		Facebook group
Four Seasons Curling Club	Blaine	Minnesota	Dedicated	6	425	yes	Minnesota, USWCA	2012	Club site
Frogtown Curling Club	St. Paul	Minnesota	Dedicated	6	725	yes	Minnesota, USWCA	2010	Club site; Biff Adams Ice Arena
Glacial Ridge Curling	Willmar	Minnesota	Arena	5	100	yes	Minnesota	2004	Club site
Hallock Curling Club	Hallock	Minnesota	Dedicated	3			Unaffiliated	1923	Facebook group
Heather Curling Club	Mapleton	Minnesota	Dedicated	4	125	yes	Minnesota, USWCA	1956	Club site
Hibbing Curling Club	Hibbing	Minnesota	Dedicated	7	300	yes	Minnesota, USWCA	1913	Club site
International Falls Curling Club	International Falls	Minnesota	Dedicated (rented)	6	25		Unaffiliated	1970	Plays Tuesday nights at Fort Frances Country Club, Ontario, Canada; some members also play in Fort Frances leagues
Itasca Curling Club	Grand Rapids	Minnesota	Dedicated	4	125	yes	Minnesota	1968	Club site
Lakes Curling Club	Detroit Lakes	Minnesota	Dedicated	4			Unaffiliated	1980	Club site
Mankato Curling Club	Mankato	Minnesota	Dedicated	5	200	yes ^{[a]}	Minnesota	1903	Club site; formerly known as Caledonia Curling Club
Marshall Curling Club	Marshall	Minnesota	Arena	2			Minnesota		
Mower County Curling Club	Austin	Minnesota	Arena	4			Minnesota	2014	Club site
North Star Curling Club	St. Cloud	Minnesota	Arena	5	100	yes	Unaffiliated	2022	Club site; started play in January 2023
Owatonna Curling Club	Owatonna	Minnesota	Dedicated	2	125	yes	Minnesota	1968	Club site
Richfield Curling Club	Richfield	Minnesota	Arena/Outdoor	4			Minnesota	2018	Club site
St. Croix Curling Center	Lakeland	Minnesota	Arena	5			Unaffiliated	2018	Club site
St. Paul Curling Club	St. Paul	Minnesota	Dedicated	8	1200	yes	Minnesota, USWCA	1912	Club site; first incarnation played from 1885 to 1904.
Stephen Curling Club	Stephen	Minnesota	Dedicated	3			Minnesota	1966	Facebook group
Thief River Falls Curling Club	Thief River Falls	Minnesota	Dedicated	4			Unaffiliated		Facebook group
Two Harbors Curling Club	Two Harbors	Minnesota	Dedicated	4	150	yes	Minnesota	1963	Club site
Vikingland Curling Club	Alexandria	Minnesota	Arena	5		yes	Minnesota	2005	Club site
Walker Curling Club	Walker	Minnesota	Arena	4			Unaffiliated	2007	Club site
Mid-South Curling Club	Olive Branch	Mississippi	Arena	4			GNCC	2016	Facebook group; left USAC in 2022
Kansas City Curling Club	Blue Springs	Missouri	Dedicated	4		no ^{[b]}	GNCC	1987	Club site; opened dedicated ice in 2022
St. Joseph Curling Club	St. Joseph	Missouri	Arena	4			Unaffiliated	2013	
St. Louis Curling Club	Creve Coeur	Missouri	Arena	5	75	yes	Midwest, USWCA	2007	Club site
Billings Curling Club	Billings	Montana	Arena	4	25	yes	Dakota Territory	2012	Club site
Bozeman Curling Club	Bozeman	Montana	Arena	4	150	yes ^{[a]}	Dakota Territory	2015	Club site
Copper City Curling Club	Butte	Montana	Arena	3	50		Dakota Territory	2011	Facebook group
Great Falls Curling Club	Great Falls	Montana	Arena	3	15	yes		2024	
Hi Line Curling Club	Havre	Montana	Arena	4	75		Dakota Territory	2014	Facebook group
Last Chance Curling Club	Helena	Montana	Arena	5	75	yes	Dakota Territory	2020	Club site
Missoula Curling Club	Missoula	Montana	Arena	5	200	yes	Dakota Territory	2010	Club site; Planning to move to dedicated
Whitefish Curling Club	Whitefish	Montana	Arena	3			Dakota Territory	2009	Club site
Aksarben Curling Club	Omaha	Nebraska	Arena	5	300	yes	Mid-America, USWCA	1958	Club site; dedicated five-sheet facility in Omaha scheduled to open in January or February 2027
CurlVegas	Las Vegas	Nevada	Dedicated	4	50	yes	GNCC	2020	Club site; joined GNCC in 2023; dedicated ice opened in 2024
Lake Tahoe Epic Curling	Stateline	Nevada	Dedicated	2	50	yes	MoPac	2012	Club site; opened a dedicated facility in May 2019
Granite Curling Club (NH)	Hollis	New Hampshire	Paper				GNCC	1972	Associated with Nashua CC
Lakes Region Curling Association	Wolfeboro	New Hampshire	Arena	5			Unaffiliated	2014	Club site
Merrimack Valley Curling Club	Merrimack	New Hampshire	Dedicated (shared)	4			GNCC	2006	Club site; curls at Nashua Country Club; started as paper club Greater Lowell (Mass.) CC
Mount Washington Valley Curling Club	Conway	New Hampshire	Arena	4	50	no ^{[b]}	GNCC	2011	Club site
Nashua Country Club	Nashua	New Hampshire	Dedicated	4			GNCC, USWCA	1928	Club site
Plymouth Rocks Curling Club	Plymouth	New Hampshire	Arena				GNCC	2014	Club site
Jersey Pinelands Curling Club	Pennsauken Township	New Jersey	Arena	5	75	yes ^{[a]}	GNCC, USWCA	2014	Club site
Plainfield Curling Club	South Plainfield	New Jersey	Dedicated	2	200	yes	GNCC, USWCA	1963	Club site
Princeton Univ. Curling Club	Princeton	New Jersey	Arena				GNCC		
Road Runner Curling Club	Albuquerque	New Mexico	Arena	2	50		GNCC	2017	Club site; plays in ice facility's tunnels. Joined USCA 2021 but left June 2023 and joined GNCC
Albany Curling Club	Albany	New York	Dedicated	2	175	yes	GNCC, USWCA	1955	Club site
Amherst Curling Club	Macedon	New York	Paper					1873	Not to be confused with Amherst CC in Nova Scotia
Ardsley Curling Club	Irvington	New York	Dedicated	3	200	yes	GNCC, USWCA	1932	Club site
Brooklyn Lakeside Curling Club	Brooklyn	New York	Arena/Outdoor	5	125	yes	GNCC	2014	Club site; working on dedicated facility
Buffalo Curling Club	Buffalo	New York	Dedicated	4			GNCC	Reestablished 2014	Club site; Old Buffalo China Complex
Collegiate Curling Association	Hamilton	New York	Paper		50	yes	GNCC		Association site; currently formed of college curling clubs from Syracuse University, Colgate University, Cornell University, and Hamilton College. Shares ice with the Utica Curling Club.
Finger Lakes Curling Club	Ithaca	New York	Arena	4		yes ^{[a]}	GNCC	2017	Club site
Lake Placid Curling Club	Lake Placid	New York	Arena	4			GNCC		Club site; Herb Brooks Arena at the Lake Placid Olympic Center
Long Island Curling Club	Syosset	New York	Arena	4	100	yes	GNCC	2008	Club site
New York Caledonian Curling Club	Bronxville	New York	Dedicated (shared)	3	25	yes	GNCC	1855	Club site; plays at Ardsley Curling Club
Rochester Curling Club	Rochester	New York	Dedicated	4		yes ^{[a]}	GNCC, USWCA	1961	Club site
Schenectady Curling Club	Schenectady	New York	Dedicated	4	300	yes	GNCC, USWCA	1907	Club site
St. Andrew's Curling Club	Dobbs Ferry	New York	Paper				GNCC		
Utica Curling Club	Whitesboro	New York	Dedicated	6		no	GNCC, USWCA	1868	Club site; left USCA in 2021; shares ice with Collegiate Curling Association.
CharLando Curling Club	Charlotte	North Carolina	Paper			no	GNCC		Social media
Charlotte Curling Association	Charlotte	North Carolina	Dedicated	4	225	yes	GNCC, USWCA	2010	Club site; dedicated facility opened November 2014
Coastal Carolina Curling Club	Wilmington	North Carolina	Arena	4	25	yes	GNCC	2011	Club site
Triangle Curling Club	Durham	North Carolina	Dedicated	4	325	yes	GNCC, USWCA	1995	Club site; dedicated facility opened April 23, 2015
Capital Curling Club	Bismarck	North Dakota	Dedicated	4	400	yes	Dakota Territory	1982	Club site
Crosby Curling Club	Crosby	North Dakota	Dedicated	3			Dakota Territory	1954	Facebook group
Drayton Curling Club	Drayton	North Dakota	Dedicated	4	25	yes ^{[a]}	Dakota Territory	1901	Club site
Fargo-Moorhead Curling Club	Fargo	North Dakota	Dedicated	6	500	yes	Dakota Territory	1938	Club site
Fortuna Curling Club	Fortuna	North Dakota	Dedicated				Dakota Territory	1961	
Grafton Curling Club	Grafton	North Dakota	Dedicated	4	100	yes	Dakota Territory, USWCA	1958	Club site
Grand Forks Curling Club	Grand Forks	North Dakota	Dedicated	4	250	yes	Dakota Territory, USWCA	1954	Club site; predecessor Caledonia CC existed from 1914 to 1935
Lake Region Curling Club	Devils Lake	North Dakota	Dedicated	5	75	yes	Dakota Territory	1960	Club site
Minot Curling Club	Minot	North Dakota	Dedicated	4	150	yes	Dakota Territory	1906	Club site
Watford City Curling Club	Watford City	North Dakota	Arena		50		Dakota Territory		Facebook group
Williston Basin Curling Club	Williston	North Dakota	Dedicated	4	175	yes	Dakota Territory	1980	Club site
Bowling Green Curling Club	Bowling Green	Ohio	Dedicated	4	275	yes	Great Lakes, USWCA	1968	Club site; dedicated Black Swamp Curling Center opened October 21, 2017
Cincinnati Curling Club	West Chester	Ohio	Dedicated	4	175	yes	Great Lakes, USWCA	2010	Club site; opened dedicated ice in 2019; expanded warm room and added 4th sheet in 2025
Cleveland Skating Club	Shaker Heights	Ohio	Arena	5	75	yes	Great Lakes, USWCA	1957	Club site; skating Club dates back to 1936
Columbus Curling Club	Columbus	Ohio	Dedicated	4	300	yes	Great Lakes, USWCA	2004	Club site
Curl Troy	Troy	Ohio	Arena/Outdoor	4		no ^{[b]}	GNCC	2010	Club site; joined GNCC in 2023.
Mayfield Curling Club	Warrensville Heights	Ohio	Dedicated	4	275	yes	Great Lakes, USWCA	1962	Club site
Oklahoma Curling Club	Oklahoma City	Oklahoma	Arena	4	75	yes	Mid-America	2010	Club site
Tulsa Curling Club	Tulsa	Oklahoma	Arena	5	100		GNCC	2012	Club site
Bend Curling Club	Bend	Oregon	Arena	4	50	yes	Pacific NW	2016	Club site; Bend Ice ice sports corporation founded in 2010
Evergreen Curling Club	Portland	Oregon	Dedicated	3	250	yes	Pacific NW	2002	Club site; moved to dedicated ice in 2012
Klamath Falls Curling Club	Klamath Falls	Oregon	Arena/Outdoor	2			MoPac	2012	
Anthracite Curling Club	Wilkes-Barre	Pennsylvania	Arena	4		no	GNCC	2006	Club site; formerly called Scranton CC
Bucks County Curling Club	Warminster	Pennsylvania	Dedicated	4	100	no	GNCC, USWCA	2010	Club site; got dedicated ice in 2015; plays year-round
Curling Club at Penn State	State College	Pennsylvania	Arena	4	25	yes		2018	See college listings; left GNCC in 2025
French Creek Curling Club	Meadville / Erie	Pennsylvania	Arena	4			GNCC	2016	
Nittany Valley Curling Club	State College	Pennsylvania	Arena	4			GNCC	2019	Facebook group; the Penn State college club is separate, though clubs share equipment
Philadelphia Curling Club	Paoli	Pennsylvania	Dedicated	2	175	yes	GNCC, USWCA	1957	Club site
Pittsburgh Curling Club	Pittsburgh	Pennsylvania	Dedicated	4	125	yes	GNCC, USWCA	2002	Club site; dedicated as of February 2020.
Rail City Curling Club	Altoona	Pennsylvania	Arena			no ^{[b]}	GNCC	2018	Club site
Ocean State Curling Club	Smithfield	Rhode Island	Arena	4		no	GNCC	2009	Club site; left USCA in 2021
Pawcatuck River Curling Club	Westerly	Rhode Island	Arena/Outdoor	2		no	GNCC	2023	
Charleston Curling Club	North Charleston	South Carolina	Arena	4	25	yes	GNCC	2017	Club site
Palmetto Curling Club	Greenville	South Carolina	Arena	4	100	yes	GNCC	2010	Club site
Aberdeen Curling Club	Aberdeen	South Dakota	Arena	4	50	yes	Dakota Territory	2014	Club site
Brookings Curling Club	Brookings	South Dakota	Arena			yes	Dakota Territory	2022	Facebook group
Rushmore Curling Club	Rapid City	South Dakota	Arena	4	50	yes	Dakota Territory	2003	Club site
Sioux Falls Curling	Sioux Falls	South Dakota	Arena	4	175	yes	Dakota Territory	2010	Club site; playing before and after youth hockey seasons. Planning to move to dedicated
Watertown Curling Club	Watertown	South Dakota	Arena		50		Dakota Territory	2010	Club site
Yankton Curling Club	Yankton	South Dakota	Arena			no	Unaffiliated	2020	Club site
Great Smoky Mountains Curling Club	Knoxville	Tennessee	Arena	5		yes ^{[a]}	Great Lakes, GNCC, USWCA	2004	Club site; joined GNCC in 2023
Nashville Curling Club	Nashville	Tennessee	Dedicated		75	yes	GNCC		Club site; plays at Tee Line Nashville, a curling/bowling restaurant owned by former NFL player Marc Bulger
Curling Club of Houston	Houston	Texas	Arena	5	100	yes	Mid-America	1973	Club site
Dallas/Fort Worth Curling Club	Irving	Texas	Dedicated	5	175	yes	Mid-America, USWCA	2002	Club site; dedicated as of 2026
Lone Star Curling Club	Austin	Texas	Arena	4	100	yes	Mid-America	2006	Club site
Cache Valley Stone Society	Logan	Utah	Arena	5			MoPac	2002	Club site; plays February to April
Ogden Curling Club	Ogden	Utah	Arena	6	50	yes	MoPac	1998	Ogden Curling Club
Park City Curling Club	Park City	Utah	Arena	6	50	yes	MoPac	2006	Club site
Utah Olympic Oval Curling Club	Salt Lake City	Utah	Arena	6	100	yes	MoPac	2016	Club site; inside 2002 Olympic speedskating oval
Green Mountain Curling Club	Burlington	Vermont	Dedicated (shared)	2			GNCC, USWCA	2005	Club site; curling at the Bedford Curling Club in Bedford, Quebec
Rutland Rocks Curling Club	Rutland	Vermont	Arena	5	50	yes ^{[a]}	GNCC, USWCA	2007	Club site
Upper Valley Curling Club	White River Junction and Woodstock	Vermont	Arena	4	50	yes ^{[a]}	GNCC	2008	Upper Valley Curling Club; previously listed as Woodstock CC; left USCA in 2021
Blue Ridge Curling Club	Charlottesville	Virginia	Arena	4			GNCC	2016	Facebook group is dormant; formerly curled at now-demolished Main Street Arena
Curling Club of Virginia	Richmond	Virginia	Arena	4		no	GNCC	2011	Club site; left USCA in 2023 due to lack of services not already offered by the GNCC
Loudoun Curling Club	Leesburg	Virginia	Arena				Unaffiliated		
Roanoke Valley Curling Club	Roanoke	Virginia	Arena			yes	GNCC		Club site
Granite Curling Club (Seattle)	Seattle	Washington	Dedicated	5	550	yes	Pacific NW, USWCA	1961	Club site
Morgantown Curling Club	Morgantown	West Virginia	Arena	3	25	yes	USCA At-Large	2018	Club site
Alpine Curling Club	Monroe	Wisconsin	Dedicated	2		yes ^{[a]}	Wisconsin	1960	Club site
Appleton Curling Club	Appleton	Wisconsin	Dedicated	4	250	yes	Wisconsin, USWCA	1939	Club site
Arlington Curling Club	Arlington	Wisconsin	Dedicated	3			Wisconsin	1954	Club site
Blackhawk Curling Club	Janesville	Wisconsin	Dedicated	3	125	yes	Wisconsin, USWCA	1965	Club site
Centerville Curling Club	Trempealeau	Wisconsin	Dedicated	4	200	yes	Wisconsin, USWCA	1948	Club site
Clintonville Curling Club	Clintonville	Wisconsin	Dedicated	2	75	yes	Wisconsin	1948	Club site
Eau Claire Curling Club	Eau Claire	Wisconsin	Dedicated	4	300	yes	Wisconsin, USWCA	1876	Club site
Green Bay Curling Club	Green Bay	Wisconsin	Dedicated	3	250	yes	Wisconsin, USWCA	1958	Club site
Hayward Curling Club	Hayward	Wisconsin	Natural ice	2		yes	Wisconsin	2024	Club site; playing indoors on natural ice in 2026-27
Kettle Moraine Curling Club	Hartland	Wisconsin	Dedicated	5	225	yes	Wisconsin, USWCA	1962	Club site
La Crosse Curling Club	La Crosse	Wisconsin	Arena	5	25	yes	Wisconsin	1914	Club site; seeking to build dedicated facility and donate to the city for summer use
Loch Wissota Curling Club	Eau Claire	Wisconsin	Outdoor	1			Wisconsin	1981	Club site
Lodi Curling Club	Lodi	Wisconsin	Dedicated	2			Wisconsin	1880	Club site
Madison Curling Club	McFarland	Wisconsin	Dedicated	6	550	yes	Wisconsin, USWCA	1921	Club site
Marshfield Curling Club	Marshfield	Wisconsin	Dedicated	3	100		Wisconsin	1976	Club site
Medford Curling Club	Medford	Wisconsin	Dedicated	4			Wisconsin	1914	Club site
Milwaukee Curling Club	Cedarburg	Wisconsin	Dedicated	5	300	yes	Wisconsin, USWCA	1845	Club site
Pardeeville Curling Club	Pardeeville	Wisconsin	Dedicated	2	50		Wisconsin	1875	Club site
Portage Curling Club	Portage	Wisconsin	Dedicated	4	175	yes	Wisconsin, USWCA	1850	Club site
Poynette Curling Club	Poynette	Wisconsin	Dedicated	2	75	yes	Wisconsin	1875	Club site
Racine Curling Club	Racine	Wisconsin	Dedicated	2	175	yes	Wisconsin, USWCA	1954	Club site
Rhinelander Curling Club	Rhinelander	Wisconsin	Arena	4		yes	Wisconsin, USWCA	2023	Club site
Rice Lake Curling Club	Rice Lake	Wisconsin	Dedicated	4	200	yes	Wisconsin, USWCA	1967	Club site
Stevens Point Curling Club	Stevens Point	Wisconsin	Dedicated	4	200	yes	Wisconsin	1959	Club site; at Sentry Curling Center since 2020
Superior Curling Club	Superior	Wisconsin	Dedicated	4	150	yes	Wisconsin	1893	Club site
Tri-City Curling Club	Wisconsin Rapids	Wisconsin	Dedicated	2	50	yes	Wisconsin	1958	https://www.tri-citycurling.org/ Club site]
Waupaca Curling Club	Waupaca	Wisconsin	Dedicated	4	125	yes	Wisconsin	1879	Club site
Wausau Curling Club	Wausau	Wisconsin	Dedicated	8	400	yes	Wisconsin, USWCA	1896	Club site
Wauwatosa Curling Club	Wauwatosa	Wisconsin	Dedicated	4	350	yes	Wisconsin, USWCA	1921	Club site
Campbell County Curling Club	Gillette	Wyoming	Arena	3					Club site

- ^{a} Left USCA in 2022 or 2023; has since rejoined
- ^{b} Left USCA in 2022 or 2023; has not rejoined

== Inactive clubs ==
Clubs with no indication of recent activity that are not claimed on a regional association's website

State	Club name	City/town	Type	Sheets	Year founded	Notes			
Alaska	Barrow Hockey & Curling Association	Barrow	Dedicated	2		Facebook group for the area says no activity since at least 2020			
California	Bakersfield Curling Club	Bakersfield				Curl California website no longer exists			
Colorado	Frosty Fox Curling Club	Crested Butte	Outdoor			No web presence			
Colorado	Nederland Curling Club	Nederland	Arena	1	2008	Facebook page not updated since 2021 season canceled			
Connecticut	LBI Curling Club (Long Beach Island)	Norwalk			2008	No activity on website since 2010			
Delaware	Curl Wilmington	Wilmington	Arena	2	2015				
Florida	Panthers Curling Club	Coral Springs	Arena	4		Facebook page dormant since 2016			
Illinois	Illinois Central Curling Club	Bloomington	Arena			Facebook page lobbies Pepsi Ice Arena to resume curling and directs people to Waltham CC.			
Illinois	Indian Hill Curling Club	Winnetka	Dedicated		1936	Featured in Sports Illustrated in 1960. Opened facility in 1965. Converted to dining/entertainment in 2007.			
Illinois	North Shore Curling Club	Glenview			1951				
Illinois	Oak Park Curling Club	River Forest			1950	Oak Park Country Club closed its curling house in 1990. Merged with Wilmette Curling Club in 2016.			
Illinois	Quad Cities Curling Club	Rock Island							
Illinois	Rockford Metro Area Curling Club	Rockford				Facebook page last updated in 2010			
Iowa	Cedar Rapids Curling Association	Waterloo				Attempts to build a dedicated club in Waterloo have stalled. Facebook group is dormant.			
Iowa	Sioux City Curling Club	Sioux City	Arena			Facebook group has been idle since 2010, but IBP Ice Center hosted annual Curling Classic in 2022.			
Iowa	Spirit Lake Curling	Sioux City				Potential venue was Lakes Ice Arena, formerly Boji Bay Ice Arena.			
Kansas	Wichita Curling Club	Wichita	Paper			Club site; restaurant Chicken N Pickle held an event in 2020			
Louisiana	Louisiana Curling Club	New Orleans				Attempted start in 2010; Twitter feed on the effort has been dormant since then.			
Louisiana	Shreveport Curling Club	Shreveport				Planned to start in 2018 at George's Pond in Shreveport, but nothing active. Facebook page is dormant.			
Michigan	Ann Arbor Curling Club	Ann Arbor				Facebook page is dormant.			
Minnesota	Edina Curling Club	Edina							
Montana	Butte Curling Club	Butte	Dedicated	3	1905				
Montana	Anaconda Curling Club	Anaconda	Dedicated	4	1908				
New Hampshire	Monadnock Curling Club	Keene			2013	Founders announced in 2010 that they were stepping away and seeking new leadership in effort to build club with dedicated ice.			
New Jersey	Garden State Curling Club	Summit			1978	Website was archived in 2009.			
New York	Canadian Club of New York	New York	Paper						
New York	Kayuta Lake Curling Club	Forestport	New York	Outdoor			GNCC	2001	Facebook group
New York	Massena Curling Club	Massena	Arena		2007	Arena curling at Massena Arena. Blog post in 2010: "Unfortunately there is no progress to report in the quest to resurrect the Massena Curling Club."			
New York	The Curling Club of Aruba	Guilderland							
North Dakota	Hazen Curling Club	Hazen	Arena			Twitter dormant since 2017; site not updated since 2018			
North Dakota	Langdon Curling Club	Langdon							
South Carolina	Columbia Curling Club	Irmo							
South Dakota	Watertown Sioux Falls Curling	Watertown				Facebook group has one post since 2017.			
Texas	Armadillo Curling Club	San Antonio							
Vermont	Equinox Curling Club	Manchester				On Facebook page: "Due to rising costs of ice time we merged our club with Rutland Rocks CC in Rutland, VT."			
Wisconsin	Chippewa Falls Curling Club	Chippewa Falls	Arena			Facebook group; has had leagues and spiels at a Chippewa hockey rink as recently as 2021			
Washington	Lakewood Curling Club	Lakewood							
Washington	Lilac City Curling Club	Spokane				Merged with Coeur d'Alene club to form Inland NW Curling Club.			
Washington	Wenatchee Curling Club	Wenatchee							
Wyoming	Casper Curling Club	Casper	Arena			Facebook post in 2018 says ice was "so crummy" that they canceled the season, though a representative participated in the 2021 USA Curling meeting as an At-Large club. No further activity on Facebook group.			
Wyoming	Cody Curling Club	Cody							
Wyoming	Sheridan Curling Club	Sheridan							

== College clubs ==
See also College Curling USA

Club or organization	City/state	Facility	Notes
USA Curling: College Curling (association)			Association site
Sun Devil Curling Club (Arizona State)	Tempe, AZ	Coyotes CC	Facebook page
Curling Club at Berkeley	Berkeley, CA	San Francisco Bay Area CC and Oakland Ice Center	Club site
University of Denver Curling Club	Denver, CO	Campus facility Joy Burns Ice Arena	Club site
Yale Curling Club	New Haven, CT	Nutmeg CC	Club site
Northwestern (Univ.) Curling Club	Evanston, IL	Chicago CC	Club site; also member of Midwest region
University of Notre Dame Curling	South Bend, IN	Plays on campus	Club site
Bowdoin College Curling Club	Brunswick, ME	Belfast CC and on-campus Watson Arena	Club site
Naval Academy Curling Club	Annapolis, MD	Potomac CC	
Boston University Curling Club	Boston, MA	Broomstones CC	Club site
Harvard Curling Club	Cambridge, MA	Broomstones CC	Club site
MIT Curling Club	Cambridge, MA	Broomstones CC	Club site
Boston College	Chestnut Hill, MA		Curling isn't currently on BC Club sports page
Minnesota Curling Club	Minneapolis, MN	Four Seasons; 2013 and 2017 national champions	Club site
Creighton Curling Club	Omaha, NE	Aksarben CC	Club site
University of Nebraska Curling Club	Lincoln, NE	Aksarben CC	Facebook group
Princeton University Curling Club	Princeton, NJ	Also member of GNCC region; not on Princeton's club sports page in 2022	Club site
Curling Club at Cornell	Ithaca, NY	Utica CC	Club site
Hamilton Club Curling	Clinton, NY	Utica CC	Club site
RPI Curling Club	Troy, NY	Schnectady CC	Club site
Syracuse University Curling Club	Syracuse, NY	Utica CC & on-campus Tennity Ice Pavilion	Facebook group
Colgate Curling	Hamilton, NY	Utica CC	Club site
RIT Curling Club	Rochester, NY	Rochester CC	Club site
North Dakota State Curling Club	Fargo, ND	Fargo-Moorhead CC	Club site
University of Toledo Curling Club	Toledo, OH	Black Swamp Curling Center (Bowling Green CC)	Club site
Curling Club at Penn State	State College, PA	Pegula Ice Arena	Facebook group; plays at same arena as separate Nittany Valley club
Penn Curling	Philadelphia	Philadelphia CC	Club site
Villanova Curling	Villanova, PA	Philadelphia CC	Club Instagram
Longhorn Collegiate Curling League	Austin, TX	Lone Star CC	Facebook group
Castleton Curling Club	Castleton, VT	Rutland Rocks CC - Giorgetti Arena	Club site Club Instagram
Curling Association of UW-Stevens Point	Stevens Point, WI	2022 national champions; Stevens Point CC	Club site
UW-Superior Curling Club	Superior, WI		Club site
Carroll University Curling Club	Waukesha, WI	Kettle Moraine CC	Facebook group
Curling Club of UW-Green Bay	Green Bay, WI	Green Bay CC	Facebook group
Carthage Curling Club	Kenosha, WI	Racine CC	Club site; club has synthetic practice surface on campus
Marquette Club Curling	Milwaukee, WI	Milwaukee CC	Club site
University of Wisconsin Club Curling	Madison, WI	Madison CC	2024 national champion; Club site
Wisconsin High School Curling (state association)			Association site; league play; 2022 championship at Wausau CC
Andover Curling Club (high school; some public programs)	Andover, MA	Phillips Academy Andover; some availability to those outside school	Club site

== Associations ==
Organization	Location	About
curlAK	Anchorage, AK	
Florida Curling Club	Hobe Sound, FL	Promotes sport statewide
Curling in Iowa	Des Moines, IA	Works as an association to help new clubs form.
Twin Cities Curling Association	Minneapolis, MN	Umbrella org for Four Seasons, Frogtown, Chaska, St. Paul, Dakota
Curl South Jersey	Mount Laurel, NJ	Promotes curling throughout southern New Jersey. Facebook group dormant since 2019.

== Other facilities ==
Facility	Location	About
District Wharf	Washington, DC	Outdoor facility
Stormcloud Brewing Company	Frankfort, MI	Outdoor; has leagues and learn-to-curls
The Barn	Fenton, MI	
The Hub Stadium	Novi, MI	Bar/restaurant with dedicated ice and axe throwing, among other activities
Buffalo River Works	Buffalo, NY	Outdoor; has leagues and rentals
Canalside	Buffalo, NY	Outdoor
Ford Ice Center	Antioch, TN	Nashville Predators facility offers private events
Andover Curling Club	Andover, MA	Phillips Academy Andover; some availability to those outside school
Hailey Ice	Hailey, ID	
South Haven Ice Rink	South Haven, MI	Outdoor
Big Sky Skating and Hockey Association	Big Sky, MT	Outdoor; has weekly league
Talkeetna Youth Hockey Association	Talkeetna, AK	Outdoor but under roof
Mammoth Lakes Parks and Rec	Mammoth Lakes, CA	Municipal offering
Breckenridge Parks and Rec	Breckenridge, CO	Municipal offering
Fraser Valley Recreation District	Fraser, CO	Municipal offering
Ice Valley Centre	Kankakee, IL	Municipal offering; includes summer leagues
Genoveva Chavez Community Center	Santa Fe, NM	Municipal offering
Cheyenne Ice Events Center	Cheyenne, WY	Municipal offering

== Roving clubs and organizations ==
Organization	Location	About
Curl NYC	Bronx, NY	Has equipment to take to local events
Margarita Curling Club		Hosts annual bonspiel at various sites; 500+ members in 26 countries/4 continents
