= 2013 United States Junior Curling Championships =

- Host city: Wayland, Massachusetts
- Arena: Broomstones Curling Club
- Dates: January 26 – February 2
- Men's winner: (Massachusetts) High Performance
- Skip: Korey Dropkin
- Third: Thomas Howell
- Second: Mark Fenner
- Lead: Alex Fenson
- Finalist: Washington (Jake Vukich)
- Women's winner: (Minnesota) High Performance
- Skip: Miranda Solem
- Third: Vicky Persinger
- Second: Karlie Koenig
- Lead: Chelsea Solem
- Finalist: Minnesota (Cory Christensen)

The 2013 United States Junior Curling Championships were held from January 26 to February 2 at the Broomstones Curling Club in Wayland, Massachusetts. The winners of the championships will represent the United States at the 2013 World Junior Curling Championships in Sochi, Russia.

== Men ==
=== Teams ===
The teams are listed as follows:

Team	Skip	Third	Second	Lead	Alternate
(Massachusetts) High Performance	Korey Dropkin	Thomas Howell	Mark Fenner	Alex Fenson	Connor Hoge
Pennsylvania	Scott Dunnam	Andrew Stopera	Steven Szemple	Andrew Dunnam	Cody Clouser
Alaska	Ryan Flippo	Quinn Evenson	Oliver Halvarson	Brandon Hall	
North Dakota	Timothy Hodek	Carlo Kolbo	Brock Olafson	Ethan Sampson	
Colorado	Preston Kramer	Spencer Culbertson	Nathan Parry	Alec Celecki	
Minnesota 1	Ethan Meyers	Kyle Kakela	Trevor Host	Cameron Ross	
Michigan	Wesley Pedersen	Aaron Carlson	William Kent	Brandon Wichman	
Wisconsin	Jeremy Stubbe	Ryan Kernosky	Andrew Summers	Evan Brauer	
Washington	Jake Vukich	Evan McAuley	Luc Violette	Nicholas Connolly	
Minnesota 2	Tony Wright	Will Howieson	Jesse Jaeger	Wesley Leksell	

=== Round-robin standings ===
Final round-robin standings

Key
Teams to playoffs
Teams to Tiebreaker

Team	Skip	W	L
(Massachusetts) High Performance	Korey Dropkin	8	1
Pennsylvania	Scott Dunnam	7	2
Washington	Jake Vukich	6	3
Minnesota 2	Tony Wright	5	4
Wisconsin	Jeremy Stubbe	5	4
North Dakota	Timothy Hodek	4	5
Alaska	Ryan Flippo	4	5
Minnesota 1	Ethan Meyers	4	5
Michigan	Wesley Pedersen	2	7
Colorado	Preston Kramer	0	9

=== Round-robin results ===
All draw times are listed in Eastern Standard Time (UTC−5).

==== Draw 1 ====
Saturday, January 26, 3:00 pm

Sheet 1	1	2	3	4	5	6	7	8	9	10	Final
Alaska (Flippo)	3	0	0	2	0	1	0	2	1	1	10
North Dakota (Hodek)	0	1	1	0	3	0	3	0	0	0	8

Sheet 2	1	2	3	4	5	6	7	8	9	10	Final
Minnesota 1 (Meyers)	2	0	2	0	4	0	0	2	3	X	13
Michigan (Pedersen)	0	2	0	1	0	1	1	0	0	X	5

Sheet 3	1	2	3	4	5	6	7	8	9	10	Final
(Massachusetts) High Performance (Dropkin)	4	0	3	2	0	5	X	X	X	X	14
Colorado (Kramer)	0	1	0	0	1	0	X	X	X	X	2

Sheet 4	1	2	3	4	5	6	7	8	9	10	Final
Wisconsin (Stubbe)	1	0	1	0	0	0	X	X	X	X	2
Washington (Vukich)	0	3	0	4	3	3	X	X	X	X	13

==== Draw 2 ====
Saturday, January 26, 7:00 pm

Sheet 1	1	2	3	4	5	6	7	8	9	10	Final
Minnesota 2 (Wright)	0	2	0	0	2	1	1	0	0	X	6
Pennsylvania (Dunnam)	1	0	3	2	0	0	0	3	1	X	10

==== Draw 3 ====
Sunday, January 27, 8:00 am

Sheet 3	1	2	3	4	5	6	7	8	9	10	Final
Washington (Vukich)	0	1	0	2	0	0	2	0	0	0	5
Minnesota 1 (Meyers)	2	0	1	0	1	0	0	1	0	1	6

Sheet 4	1	2	3	4	5	6	7	8	9	10	Final
(Massachusetts) High Performance (Dropkin)	2	0	1	2	0	1	0	3	X	X	9
Michigan (Pedersen)	0	1	0	0	1	0	1	0	X	X	3

==== Draw 4 ====
Sunday, January 27, 12:00 pm

Sheet 3	1	2	3	4	5	6	7	8	9	10	Final
Minnesota 2 (Wright)	0	0	0	0	1	0	0	X	X	X	1
North Dakota (Hodek)	1	0	2	3	0	1	2	X	X	X	9

Sheet 4	1	2	3	4	5	6	7	8	9	10	Final
Pennsylvania (Dunnam)	0	0	1	0	1	1	1	0	0	X	4
Wisconsin (Stubbe)	1	1	0	1	0	0	0	2	1	X	6

==== Draw 5 ====
Sunday, January 27, 4:00 pm

Sheet 2	1	2	3	4	5	6	7	8	9	10	Final
Colorado (Kramer)	0	0	1	0	0	1	X	X	X	X	2
Alaska (Flippo)	2	5	0	3	4	0	X	X	X	X	14

==== Draw 6 ====
Sunday, January 27, 8:00 pm

Sheet 1	1	2	3	4	5	6	7	8	9	10	Final
Washington (Vukich)	0	5	0	4	0	4	X	X	X	X	13
Michigan (Pedersen)	1	0	1	0	1	0	X	X	X	X	3

Sheet 2	1	2	3	4	5	6	7	8	9	10	11	Final
North Dakota (Hodek)	0	0	2	1	0	1	0	0	0	2	0	6
Wisconsin (Stubbe)	1	1	0	0	1	0	1	1	1	0	1	7

Sheet 3	1	2	3	4	5	6	7	8	9	10	Final
(Massachusetts) High Performance (Dropkin)	0	2	0	2	0	1	1	0	0	1	7
Pennsylvania (Dunnam)	1	0	4	0	1	0	0	1	1	0	8

==== Draw 7 ====
Monday, January 28, 8:00 am

Sheet 3	1	2	3	4	5	6	7	8	9	10	Final
Minnesota 1 (Meyers)	0	2	1	0	4	2	1	X	X	X	10
Colorado (Kramer)	1	0	0	1	0	0	0	X	X	X	2

Sheet 4	1	2	3	4	5	6	7	8	9	10	Final
Alaska (Flippo)	1	0	2	0	1	0	0	0	0	0	4
Minnesota 2 (Wright)	0	2	0	1	0	2	0	1	2	1	9

==== Draw 8 ====
Monday, January 28, 12:00 pm

Sheet 2	1	2	3	4	5	6	7	8	9	10	Final
Washington (Vukich)	0	2	0	0	0	0	0	0	0	X	2
(Massachusetts) High Performance (Dropkin)	0	0	0	2	2	1	0	1	1	X	7

==== Draw 9 ====
Monday, January 28, 4:00 pm

Sheet 1	1	2	3	4	5	6	7	8	9	10	Final
Michigan (Pedersen)	0	2	0	3	1	1	3	X	X	X	10
Colorado (Kramer)	1	0	1	0	0	0	0	X	X	X	2

Sheet 2	1	2	3	4	5	6	7	8	9	10	Final
Alaska (Flippo)	0	2	0	0	0	1	0	X	X	X	3
Pennsylvania (Dunnam)	2	0	1	3	1	0	2	X	X	X	9

Sheet 3	1	2	3	4	5	6	7	8	9	10	Final
Wisconsin (Stubbe)	1	1	0	0	0	0	0	2	0	0	4
Minnesota 2 (Wright)	0	0	2	1	1	1	0	0	1	1	7

Sheet 4	1	2	3	4	5	6	7	8	9	10	Final
North Dakota (Hodek)	1	0	2	0	0	3	0	2	0	1	9
Minnesota 1 (Meyers)	0	1	0	0	1	0	1	0	3	0	6

==== Draw 11 ====
Tuesday, January 29, 8:00 am

Sheet 1	1	2	3	4	5	6	7	8	9	10	Final
Alaska (Flippo)	1	0	1	0	0	1	0	0	1	0	4
Washington (Vukich)	0	1	0	0	2	0	2	1	0	0	6

Sheet 2	1	2	3	4	5	6	7	8	9	10	Final
Minnesota 2 (Wright)	5	1	0	4	2	X	X	X	X	X	12
Colorado (Kramer)	0	0	1	0	0	X	X	X	X	X	1

Sheet 4	1	2	3	4	5	6	7	8	9	10	Final
Michigan (Pedersen)	0	1	0	0	1	0	1	1	0	X	4
Pennsylvania (Dunnam)	2	0	3	1	0	1	0	0	1	X	8

==== Draw 12 ====
Tuesday, January 29, 12:00 pm

Sheet 1	1	2	3	4	5	6	7	8	9	10	Final
Minnesota 1 (Meyers)	2	0	2	0	0	0	1	0	2	0	7
Wisconsin (Stubbe)	0	1	0	2	1	1	0	3	0	1	9

Sheet 2	1	2	3	4	5	6	7	8	9	10	Final
(Massachusetts) High Performance (Dropkin)	3	3	0	1	0	0	0	1	X	X	8
North Dakota (Hodek)	0	0	0	0	0	1	1	0	X	X	2

==== Draw 13 ====
Tuesday, January 29, 4:00 pm

Sheet 2	1	2	3	4	5	6	7	8	9	10	Final
Pennsylvania (Dunnam)	0	0	1	0	3	0	0	X	X	X	4
Washington (Vukich)	1	2	0	1	0	4	3	X	X	X	11

==== Draw 14 ====
Tuesday, January 29, 8:00 pm

Sheet 1	1	2	3	4	5	6	7	8	9	10	Final
Colorado (Kramer)	0	1	1	0	0	3	0	0	0	X	5
North Dakota (Hodek)	1	0	0	3	2	0	2	1	1	X	10

Sheet 2	1	2	3	4	5	6	7	8	9	10	Final
Minnesota 1 (Meyers)	0	0	0	0	1	0	1	0	2	X	4
Minnesota 2 (Wright)	0	0	0	1	0	3	0	3	0	X	7

Sheet 3	1	2	3	4	5	6	7	8	9	10	Final
Michigan (Pedersen)	0	0	1	0	3	1	0	3	0	X	8
Wisconsin (Stubbe)	0	2	0	4	0	0	6	0	2	X	14

Sheet 4	1	2	3	4	5	6	7	8	9	10	Final
Alaska (Flippo)	0	1	0	0	1	0	1	0	1	X	4
(Massachusetts) High Performance (Dropkin)	2	0	0	2	0	2	0	1	0	X	7

==== Draw 16 ====
Wednesday, January 30, 12:00 pm

Sheet 1	1	2	3	4	5	6	7	8	9	10	Final
Minnesota 2 (Wright)	0	1	0	0	1	0	2	0	0	X	4
(Massachusetts) High Performance (Dropkin)	2	0	1	1	0	1	0	0	3	X	8

Sheet 4	1	2	3	4	5	6	7	8	9	10	11	Final
Pennsylvania (Dunnam)	1	0	2	0	1	0	1	0	2	0	1	8
Minnesota 1 (Meyers)	0	2	0	2	0	0	0	2	0	1	0	7

==== Draw 17 ====
Wednesday, January 30, 4:00 pm

Sheet 1	1	2	3	4	5	6	7	8	9	10	Final
Wisconsin (Stubbe)	1	1	1	3	1	5	X	X	X	X	12
Colorado (Kramer)	0	0	0	0	0	0	X	X	X	X	0

Sheet 2	1	2	3	4	5	6	7	8	9	10	Final
Michigan (Pedersen)	1	0	1	0	1	1	0	2	0	X	6
Alaska (Flippo)	0	1	0	1	0	0	2	0	4	X	8

Sheet 3	1	2	3	4	5	6	7	8	9	10	11	Final
North Dakota (Hodek)	0	1	0	1	1	0	2	0	0	0	2	7
Washington (Vukich)	0	0	1	0	0	0	0	2	1	1	0	5

==== Draw 19 ====
Thursday, January 31, 8:00 am

Sheet 1	1	2	3	4	5	6	7	8	9	10	Final
Washington (Vukich)	2	0	3	0	0	4	X	X	X	X	9
Minnesota 2 (Wright)	0	1	0	1	0	0	X	X	X	X	2

Sheet 2	1	2	3	4	5	6	7	8	9	10	Final
Wisconsin (Stubbe)	0	0	0	1	0	X	X	X	X	X	1
(Massachusetts) High Performance (Dropkin)	0	4	4	0	2	X	X	X	X	X	10

Sheet 3	1	2	3	4	5	6	7	8	9	10	Final
Colorado (Kramer)	1	1	1	0	0	0	0	X	X	X	3
Pennsylvania (Dunnam)	0	0	0	4	2	3	2	X	X	X	11

Sheet 4	1	2	3	4	5	6	7	8	9	10	Final
Minnesota 1 (Meyers)	1	0	4	0	0	2	1	0	1	1	10
Alaska (Flippo)	0	5	0	1	1	0	0	1	0	0	8

==== Draw 21 ====
Thursday, January 31, 8:00 pm

Sheet 1	1	2	3	4	5	6	7	8	9	10	Final
(Massachusetts) High Performance (Dropkin)	0	2	0	1	0	1	0	0	0	1	5
Minnesota 1 (Meyers)	0	0	1	0	1	0	1	1	0	0	4

Sheet 2	1	2	3	4	5	6	7	8	9	10	11	Final
North Dakota (Hodek)	0	2	0	2	0	1	0	3	0	0	0	8
Michigan (Pedersen)	1	0	3	0	1	0	1	0	1	1	1	9

Sheet 4	1	2	3	4	5	6	7	8	9	10	Final
Colorado (Kramer)	0	0	0	1	0	X	X	X	X	X	1
Washington (Vukich)	4	3	1	0	3	X	X	X	X	X	11

==== Draw 22 ====
Friday, February 1, 8:00 am

Sheet 3	1	2	3	4	5	6	7	8	9	10	Final
Wisconsin (Stubbe)	2	0	0	0	0	0	1	0	1	X	4
Alaska (Flippo)	0	2	0	1	1	4	0	2	0	X	10

==== Draw 23 ====
Friday, February 1, 12:00 pm

Sheet 3	1	2	3	4	5	6	7	8	9	10	Final
Pennsylvania (Dunnam)	0	0	1	3	0	0	1	0	1	1	7
North Dakota (Hodek)	0	0	0	0	2	0	0	1	0	0	3

Sheet 4	1	2	3	4	5	6	7	8	9	10	Final
Minnesota 2 (Wright)	4	0	3	1	0	X	X	X	X	X	8
Michigan (Pedersen)	0	1	0	0	1	X	X	X	X	X	2

=== Tiebreaker ===
Friday, February 1, 4:00 pm

Team	1	2	3	4	5	6	7	8	9	10	Final
Wisconsin (Stubbe)	0	0	2	0	1	0	0	X	X	X	3
Minnesota 2 (Wright)	4	0	0	3	0	1	3	X	X	X	11

=== Playoffs ===
Page playoff system
1	(Massachusetts) High Performance	7
2	Pennsylvania	2
3	Washington	10
4	Minnesota 2	4

Semifinal
2	Pennsylvania	7
3	Washington	9

Final
1	(Massachusetts) High Performance	8
3	Washington	6

==== 1 vs. 2 ====
Friday, February 1, 8:00 pm

Team	1	2	3	4	5	6	7	8	9	10	Final
(Massachusetts) High Performance (Dropkin)	0	1	0	2	2	0	0	2	X	X	7
Pennsylvania (Dunnam)	0	0	0	0	0	1	1	0	X	X	2

==== 3 vs. 4 ====
Friday, February 1, 8:00 pm

Team	1	2	3	4	5	6	7	8	9	10	Final
Washington (Vukich)	3	2	0	3	0	0	2	X	X	X	10
Minnesota 2 (Wright)	0	0	1	0	2	1	0	X	X	X	4

==== Semifinal ====
Saturday, February 2, 9:00 am

Team	1	2	3	4	5	6	7	8	9	10	Final
Pennsylvania (Dunnam)	1	0	4	1	0	0	1	0	0	0	7
Washington (Vukich)	0	2	0	0	0	1	0	1	4	1	9

==== Final ====
Saturday, February 2, 1:30 pm

Team	1	2	3	4	5	6	7	8	9	10	Final
(Massachusetts) High Performance (Dropkin)	1	0	2	0	2	0	2	1	0	X	8
Washington (Vukich)	0	1	0	1	0	2	0	0	2	X	6

== Women ==
=== Teams ===
The teams are listed as follows:

Team	Skip	Third	Second	Lead	Alternate
(Minnesota) High Performance	Miranda Solem	Vicky Persinger	Karlie Koenig	Chelsea Solem	
Pennsylvania	Sarah Anderson	Kathleen Dubberstein	Taylor Anderson	Leilani Dubberstein	Abigail Suslavich
North Dakota 2	Emily Brekke	Caitlyn Day	Taylor Drees	Claire Bauske	Mara Nysetvold
Minnesota	Cory Christensen	Rebecca Funk	Anna Bauman	Sonja Bauman	
New York	Hannah Ely	Emily Walker	Abigail Morrison	Rebecca Vanarsdall	
Alaska	Kaitlin Fowler	Cora Farrell	Naimy Schommer	Ariel Traxler	
Wisconsin	Jenna Haag	Chloe Pahl	Grace Gabower	Erin Wallace	Brittany Falk
North Dakota 1	Abigayle Lindgren	Emily Lindgren	Katie Sigurdson	Madeleine Shaft	Kelsey Colwell
Michigan	Alexis Schroeder	Sidney Schroeder	Kayla Beauregard	Kaely Harmer	
Washington	Shelby Sweet	Cori Tomlinson	Nikole Lorvick	Summer Barnes	Christine Donnan

=== Round-robin standings ===
Final round-robin standings

Key
Teams to playoffs

Team	Skip	W	L
Minnesota	Cory Christensen	8	1
(Minnesota) High Performance	Miranda Solem	7	2
Pennsylvania	Sarah Anderson	7	2
Wisconsin	Jenna Haag	7	2
North Dakota 1	Abigayle Lindgren	4	5
Alaska	Kaitlin Fowler	3	6
North Dakota 2	Emily Brekke	3	6
New York	Hannah Ely	3	6
Washington	Shelby Sweet	3	6
Michigan	Alexis Schroeder	0	9

=== Round-robin results ===
All draw times are listed in Eastern Standard Time (UTC−5).

==== Draw 2 ====
Saturday, January 26, 7:00 pm

Sheet 2	1	2	3	4	5	6	7	8	9	10	Final
Minnesota (Christensen)	1	3	0	4	5	0	X	X	X	X	13
Washington (Sweet)	0	0	1	0	0	1	X	X	X	X	2

Sheet 3	1	2	3	4	5	6	7	8	9	10	Final
(Minnesota) High Performance (Solem)	1	3	0	3	0	2	X	X	X	X	9
Michigan (Schroeder)	0	0	1	0	1	0	X	X	X	X	2

Sheet 4	1	2	3	4	5	6	7	8	9	10	Final
Wisconsin (Haag)	0	2	3	2	0	2	3	X	X	X	12
North Dakota 2 (Brekke)	0	0	0	0	2	0	0	X	X	X	2

==== Draw 3 ====
Sunday, January 27, 8:00 am

Sheet 1	1	2	3	4	5	6	7	8	9	10	Final
North Dakota 1 (Lindgren)	0	0	0	1	0	1	1	2	0	0	5
Pennsylvania (Anderson)	1	2	2	0	1	0	0	0	4	0	10

Sheet 2	1	2	3	4	5	6	7	8	9	10	Final
New York (Ely)	1	0	1	0	0	1	0	1	1	0	5
Alaska (Fowler)	0	1	0	2	1	0	2	0	0	2	8

==== Draw 4 ====
Sunday, January 27, 12:00 pm

Sheet 1	1	2	3	4	5	6	7	8	9	10	Final
(Minnesota) High Performance (Solem)	3	0	2	0	1	0	1	4	X	X	11
Washington (Sweet)	0	1	0	1	0	1	0	0	X	X	3

Sheet 2	1	2	3	4	5	6	7	8	9	10	Final
Minnesota (Christensen)	0	1	1	0	2	0	1	1	0	0	6
North Dakota 2 (Brekke)	1	0	0	1	0	1	0	0	1	1	5

==== Draw 5 ====
Sunday, January 27, 4:00 pm

Sheet 1	1	2	3	4	5	6	7	8	9	10	Final
Alaska (Fowler)	0	1	0	0	0	0	X	X	X	X	1
Wisconsin (Haag)	1	0	3	4	3	2	X	X	X	X	13

Sheet 3	1	2	3	4	5	6	7	8	9	10	Final
New York (Ely)	1	1	0	0	0	1	1	0	X	X	4
Pennsylvania (Anderson)	0	0	2	3	3	0	0	2	X	X	10

Sheet 4	1	2	3	4	5	6	7	8	9	10	Final
North Dakota 1 (Lindgren)	2	5	1	1	0	X	X	X	X	X	9
Michigan (Schroeder)	0	0	0	0	1	X	X	X	X	X	1

==== Draw 6 ====
Sunday, January 27, 8:00 pm

Sheet 4	1	2	3	4	5	6	7	8	9	10	11	Final
North Dakota 2 (Brekke)	0	1	0	0	1	2	5	0	0	0	1	10
Washington (Sweet)	1	0	1	1	0	0	0	1	3	2	0	9

==== Draw 7 ====
Monday, January 28, 8:00 am

Sheet 2	1	2	3	4	5	6	7	8	9	10	Final
Wisconsin (Haag)	0	0	2	0	2	0	1	0	0	X	5
Pennsylvania (Anderson)	3	2	0	2	0	1	0	2	1	X	11

==== Draw 8 ====
Monday, January 28, 12:00 pm

Sheet 1	1	2	3	4	5	6	7	8	9	10	Final
Michigan (Schroeder)	0	1	0	0	1	0	X	X	X	X	2
Minnesota (Christensen)	2	0	2	5	0	1	X	X	X	X	10

Sheet 3	1	2	3	4	5	6	7	8	9	10	Final
Alaska (Fowler)	0	1	0	0	1	0	X	X	X	X	2
(Minnesota) High Performance (Solem)	7	0	4	0	0	1	X	X	X	X	12

Sheet 4	1	2	3	4	5	6	7	8	9	10	Final
New York (Ely)	0	0	2	0	0	1	0	2	0	X	5
North Dakota 1 (Lindgren)	1	2	0	0	4	0	2	0	1	X	10

==== Draw 10 ====
Monday, January 28, 8:00 pm

Sheet 1	1	2	3	4	5	6	7	8	9	10	Final
North Dakota 2 (Brekke)	1	0	0	1	0	0	0	0	0	X	2
(Minnesota) High Performance (Solem)	0	2	1	0	2	1	1	1	0	X	8

Sheet 2	1	2	3	4	5	6	7	8	9	10	Final
North Dakota 1 (Lindgren)	0	1	0	2	0	1	0	2	0	0	6
Alaska (Fowler)	1	0	1	0	1	0	1	0	1	3	8

Sheet 3	1	2	3	4	5	6	7	8	9	10	Final
Washington (Sweet)	3	0	0	0	1	0	0	3	2	X	9
Michigan (Schroeder)	0	1	1	1	0	1	1	0	0	X	5

Sheet 4	1	2	3	4	5	6	7	8	9	10	Final
Minnesota (Christensen)	0	0	1	2	1	0	6	X	X	X	10
Pennsylvania (Anderson)	2	0	0	0	0	1	0	X	X	X	3

==== Draw 11 ====
Tuesday, January 29, 8:00 am

Sheet 3	1	2	3	4	5	6	7	8	9	10	Final
Wisconsin (Haag)	0	0	0	0	1	1	1	3	0	2	8
New York (Ely)	2	1	1	1	0	0	0	0	1	0	6

==== Draw 12 ====
Tuesday, January 29, 12:00 pm

Sheet 3	1	2	3	4	5	6	7	8	9	10	Final
North Dakota 1 (Lindgren)	1	0	1	0	1	1	2	1	0	X	7
North Dakota 2 (Brekke)	0	1	0	1	0	0	0	0	1	X	3

Sheet 4	1	2	3	4	5	6	7	8	9	10	Final
Washington (Sweet)	2	1	2	0	2	1	0	2	1	X	11
Alaska (Fowler)	0	0	0	3	0	0	1	0	0	X	4

==== Draw 13 ====
Tuesday, January 29, 4:00 pm

Sheet 1	1	2	3	4	5	6	7	8	9	10	Final
Wisconsin (Haag)	0	0	0	1	0	3	2	1	X	X	7
Minnesota (Christensen)	0	0	0	0	1	0	0	0	X	X	1

Sheet 3	1	2	3	4	5	6	7	8	9	10	Final
(Minnesota) High Performance (Solem)	0	2	0	1	1	3	0	3	X	X	10
Pennsylvania (Anderson)	1	0	1	0	0	0	2	0	X	X	4

Sheet 4	1	2	3	4	5	6	7	8	9	10	Final
Michigan (Schroeder)	1	0	1	0	0	1	0	0	0	X	3
New York (Ely)	0	1	0	2	2	0	2	1	1	X	9

==== Draw 15 ====
Wednesday, January 30, 8:00 am

Sheet 2	1	2	3	4	5	6	7	8	9	10	Final
Pennsylvania (Anderson)	0	0	2	0	3	2	0	3	X	X	10
Michigan (Schroeder)	0	1	0	1	0	0	1	0	X	X	3

Sheet 3	1	2	3	4	5	6	7	8	9	10	Final
North Dakota 2 (Brekke)	1	0	1	0	3	0	0	2	0	2	9
Alaska (Fowler)	0	1	0	2	0	1	1	0	1	0	6

Sheet 4	1	2	3	4	5	6	7	8	9	10	Final
Wisconsin (Haag)	2	0	2	2	0	2	1	0	3	X	12
Washington (Sweet)	0	1	0	0	1	0	0	2	0	X	4

==== Draw 16 ====
Wednesday, January 30, 12:00 pm

Sheet 2	1	2	3	4	5	6	7	8	9	10	Final
(Minnesota) High Performance (Solem)	2	1	0	0	0	0	0	0	2	0	5
North Dakota 1 (Lindgren)	0	0	0	1	0	1	1	2	0	1	6

Sheet 3	1	2	3	4	5	6	7	8	9	10	Final
New York (Ely)	0	0	2	0	1	1	0	0	1	0	5
Minnesota (Christensen)	0	1	0	2	0	0	2	3	0	2	10

==== Draw 17 ====
Wednesday, January 30, 4:00 pm

Sheet 4	1	2	3	4	5	6	7	8	9	10	Final
Pennsylvania (Anderson)	1	1	0	0	3	2	0	0	1	X	8
North Dakota 2 (Brekke)	0	0	1	1	0	0	1	1	0	X	4

==== Draw 18 ====
Wednesday, January 30, 8:00 pm

Sheet 1	1	2	3	4	5	6	7	8	9	10	Final
Washington (Sweet)	2	1	0	1	0	1	0	1	1	1	8
North Dakota 1 (Lindgren)	0	0	4	0	1	0	1	0	0	0	6

Sheet 2	1	2	3	4	5	6	7	8	9	10	Final
Alaska (Fowler)	0	0	0	1	0	0	0	X	X	X	1
Minnesota (Christensen)	2	3	2	0	0	3	3	X	X	X	13

Sheet 3	1	2	3	4	5	6	7	8	9	10	Final
Michigan (Schroeder)	0	0	0	0	0	X	X	X	X	X	0
Wisconsin (Haag)	3	2	1	2	1	X	X	X	X	X	9

Sheet 4	1	2	3	4	5	6	7	8	9	10	Final
New York (Ely)	0	0	1	0	1	0	1	0	X	X	3
(Minnesota) High Performance (Solem)	1	1	0	1	0	2	0	4	X	X	9

==== Draw 20 ====
Thursday, January 31, 4:00 pm

Sheet 1	1	2	3	4	5	6	7	8	9	10	Final
North Dakota 2 (Brekke)	0	0	1	0	1	0	3	0	2	0	7
New York (Ely)	3	2	0	1	0	1	0	2	0	2	11

Sheet 2	1	2	3	4	5	6	7	8	9	10	Final
(Minnesota) High Performance (Solem)	0	2	0	2	1	0	2	0	4	X	11
Wisconsin (Haag)	1	0	2	0	0	2	0	1	0	X	6

Sheet 3	1	2	3	4	5	6	7	8	9	10	Final
Minnesota (Christensen)	0	1	2	0	0	1	2	0	2	2	10
North Dakota 1 (Lindgren)	1	0	0	1	1	0	0	2	0	0	5

Sheet 4	1	2	3	4	5	6	7	8	9	10	Final
Alaska (Fowler)	1	1	0	1	0	0	1	0	1	1	6
Michigan (Schroeder)	0	0	1	0	1	2	0	1	0	0	5

==== Draw 21 ====
Thursday, January 31, 8:00 pm

Sheet 3	1	2	3	4	5	6	7	8	9	10	Final
Pennsylvania (Anderson)	0	2	3	0	4	0	0	1	X	X	10
Washington (Sweet)	2	0	0	0	0	2	1	0	X	X	5

==== Draw 22 ====
Friday, February 1, 8:00 am

Sheet 1	1	2	3	4	5	6	7	8	9	10	Final
North Dakota 1 (Lindgren)	0	1	0	2	0	1	2	1	0	0	7
Wisconsin (Haag)	0	0	1	0	3	0	0	0	3	1	8

Sheet 2	1	2	3	4	5	6	7	8	9	10	Final
Michigan (Schroeder)	0	3	0	0	2	0	0	0	0	X	5
North Dakota 2 (Brekke)	2	0	1	1	0	0	0	2	2	X	8

Sheet 4	1	2	3	4	5	6	7	8	9	10	Final
Minnesota (Christensen)	2	1	1	0	1	0	1	1	X	X	7
(Minnesota) High Performance (Solem)	0	0	0	1	0	1	0	0	X	X	2

==== Draw 23 ====
Friday, February 1, 12:00 pm

Sheet 1	1	2	3	4	5	6	7	8	9	10	Final
Pennsylvania (Anderson)	1	3	0	0	2	1	0	1	0	X	8
Alaska (Fowler)	0	0	2	1	0	0	1	0	1	X	5

Sheet 2	1	2	3	4	5	6	7	8	9	10	Final
Washington (Sweet)	2	0	1	1	2	0	1	0	2	0	9
New York (Ely)	0	6	0	0	0	1	0	2	0	1	10

=== Playoffs ===
Page playoff system
1	Minnesota	8
2	(Minnesota) High Performance	4
3	Pennsylvania	4
4	Wisconsin	8

Semifinal
2	(Minnesota) High Performance	8
3	Wisconsin	7

Final
1	Minnesota	6
2	(Minnesota) High Performance	7

==== 1 vs. 2 ====
Friday, February 1, 8:00 pm

Team	1	2	3	4	5	6	7	8	9	10	Final
Minnesota (Christensen)	0	1	0	1	2	0	2	0	2	X	8
(Minnesota) High Performance (Solem)	0	0	2	0	0	1	0	1	0	X	4

==== 3 vs. 4 ====
Friday, February 1, 8:00 pm

Team	1	2	3	4	5	6	7	8	9	10	Final
Pennsylvania (Anderson)	0	1	0	2	1	0	0	0	0	0	4
Wisconsin (Haag)	0	0	1	0	0	1	1	1	1	3	8

==== Semifinal ====
Saturday, February 2, 9:00 am

Team	1	2	3	4	5	6	7	8	9	10	Final
(Minnesota) High Performance (Solem)	1	1	1	0	0	3	0	1	0	1	8
Wisconsin (Haag)	0	0	0	2	0	0	2	0	3	0	7

==== Final ====
Saturday, February 2, 1:30 pm

Team	1	2	3	4	5	6	7	8	9	10	Final
Minnesota (Christensen)	1	0	0	0	1	2	0	1	1	0	6
(Minnesota) High Performance (Solem)	0	0	2	1	0	0	2	0	0	2	7
