= Ardsley Curling Club =

Curling club in Ardsley, New York

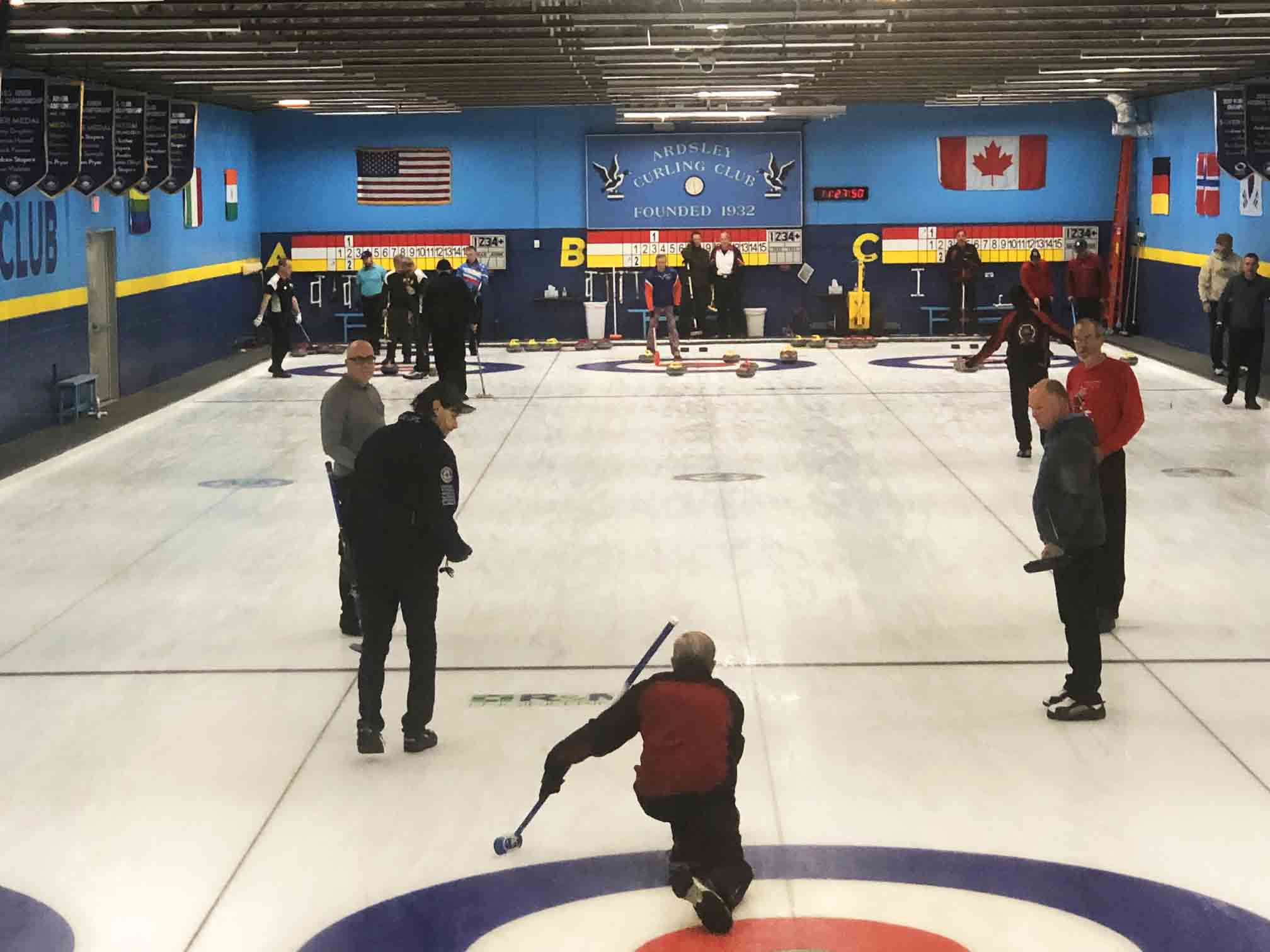
- Ardsley Curling Club
- Location: 100 North Mountain Drive, Ardsley, New York; USA

Information
- Established: 1932
- Founders: William A. Kimbel and members of the Ardsley Racquet and Swimming Club, (the name by which the Ardsley Country Club was once known)
- Club type: Dedicated ice club
- USCA region: Grand National Curling Club (GNCC)
- Sheets of ice: Three
- Rock colors: Red and Yellow
- Website: https://www.ardsleycurling.com/

The Ardsley Curling Club (ACC) is a curling club founded in Ardsley, New York in 1932. Ardsley is a village in Westchester County, New York thirty minutes north of New York City by commuter train. The Ardsley Curling Club is a dedicated ice-curling club and is one of the oldest curling clubs in the eastern United States. On the grounds of the historic Ardsley Country Club, the ACC hosts curling on three sheets from October through April. It has about 200 members, and offers Open House, Learn to Curl, and Curling & Cocktails sessions for visitors, plus nightly and weekend leagues for members. It also hosts several bonspiels (curling tournaments) throughout the season. The club is the current or former home to many nationally and internationally ranked players, including Danny Casper, Andrew Stopera, and Bill Stopera, and to longtime patron of curling Kaytaro "Kay" Sugahara. The ACC has been a member of the Grand National Curling Club (GNCC), since 1932.

== History ==
Before building their current facility in 1966, Ardsley curlers played at Saint Andrews Curling Club in Hastings-on-Hudson. Two other “paper” clubs that lacked their own ice – the New York Caledonians and the Ardwicks, a women's club – also curled at Saint Andrews until that facility was torn down in the 1980s. Today, the Caledonians, Saint Andrews, and the Ardwicks are all members of ACC.

In February 2017, the Royal Caledonian Curling Club, of Scotland visited the Ardsley Curling Club as part of its international tour competing for the Herries Maxwell Trophy. The Ardsley Curling Club won the match by a score of 11–8.

== Notable members ==
- Danny Casper, began curling at the age of 11 at the Ardsley Curling Club. Qualified for the 2026 Winter Olympics
- Andrew Stopera, Career is rooted in the Ardsley Curling Club. He is a three-time United States Junior Champion and won the silver medal at the 2017 World Junior Championships.
