= Pittsburgh Curling Club =

- Current logo & pin design of the Pittsburgh Curling Club
- Location: Pittsburgh, Pennsylvania

Information
- Established: 2002
- Club type: Dedicated
- USCA region: Grand National Curling Club
- Sheets of ice: Four
- Website: http://www.pittsburghcurlingclub.com

The Pittsburgh Curling Club (or PghCC) is a curling club located in Pittsburgh, Pennsylvania. The PghCC was founded in 2002 with 12 members, and as of 2020 has over 100 members.

The club opened its new four sheet dedicated ice facility in Stowe Township in February 2020.

== Facility ==
The PghCC operates at 491 McCoy Road, Pittsburgh, PA. 15136

== Origin ==
The Pittsburgh Curling Club was founded in May 2002, after months of emails and discussions between several ex-pat Canadians and local Pittsburgh residents. The twelve founding members rented ice for 26 weeks at Robert Morris University (RMU) Island Sports Center to start offering Learn-to-Curl sessions. Initially, the members had to draw the curling sheet lines and circles by hand prior to playing their games.

In 2007, the Pittsburgh Curling Club received its 501(c)(3) status as a charitable organization. The mission of the club is:

... to teach, develop, promote and encourage the sport of Curling; to develop youth and adult programs that lead to local, national and international competition; to coordinate and develop interscholastic competition; and to teach the sport to youth organizations as well as to interested adults by creating public awareness and appreciation for the sport.

== Bonspiels ==
The Bonspiel schedule for 2020 is to be determined.

The Pittsburgh Curling Club hosted an annual summer bonspiel. from 2006 - 2017.

- TropiCurl: held in early July, was an "open" format bonspiel (for teams made up of any combination of men, women, and juniors) that drew curlers from all over the United States and Canada.

=== TropiCurl ===
TropiCurl was held around the July 4th weekend.

==== Past TropiCurl winners ====
- 2017: Da Beers, (Chicago CC / Pittsburgh CC) Skip: Colin Rittgers, Vice: Michelle Rittgers, 2nd: Aaron Horowitz, Lead: Neill Turner
- 2016: Team Couch, (Potomac CC, Laurel MD / Columbus CC, Columbus OH / Mayfield CC, Cleveland OH), Skip: Melvin Shaw, Vice: Courtney Shaw, 2nd: Eric Johnson, Lead: Julia DiBaggio
- 2015: Draw the Four, (Glendale Curling Club – Ontario) Skip: Simon Ouellet, Vice: Danielle Breedon, 2nd: Todd Breedon, Lead: Betty Calic
- 2014: Team Scott, (Hamilton Victoria) Skip: John Scott, Vice: Judy Scott, 2nd: Jim Neales, Lead: Christina Neales
- 2013: Team Miller, (St. Georges) Skip: J. Miller, Vice: L. Berwick, 2nd: M. Berwick, Lead: S. Penton
- 2012: Team Burchesky, (New Pond Curling Club) Skip: D. Burchesky, Vice: S. Burchesky, 2nd: J. Burchesky, Lead: J. Burchesky
- 2011: Team Murray, (Potomac Curling Club, Laurel, MD) Skip. Sean Murray Vice, Nick Datlowe 2nd, Jeremy Vanderhouten Lead, Melissa Fox
- 2010: Team Murray, (Potomac Curling Club, Laurel, MD) Skip: Sean Murray, Vice: Nick Datlowe, 2nd: Jeremy Vanderhouten, Lead: Melissa Fox
- 2009: Team Moretto, Richmond Hill Curling Club Skip: D. Moretto, Vice: B. Gillispie, 2nd: P. DiClemente, Lead: B. Woolnough
- 2008: Team Epping, Tam Heather Curling Club Skip: J. Epping, Vice: K. Smith, 2nd: S. Smith, Lead: S. Collins
- 2007: Team Durrant, Plainfield Curling Club Skip: D. Durrant, Vice: A. Dubberly, 2nd: M. Dubberly, Lead: B. Peskoff
- 2006: Team Inglis, (Brampton Curling Club) Skip: Danielle Inglis, Vice: Jeff Inglis, 2nd: Mark Inglis, Lead: Lori Inglis

== Affiliations ==
- Grand National Curling Club
- United States Curling Association
- United States Women's Curling Association
- World Curling Federation
