= Grand National Curling Club =

American national association of curling clubs

- Sport: Curling
- Jurisdiction: Regional
- Membership: 73 curling clubs
- Abbreviation: GNCC
- Founded: 1867
- Affiliation: None

Official website
- www.gncc.org
- (United States)

The Grand National Curling Club (GNCC), founded in 1867, was the first National Curling Organization encompassing the entire United States. It remained the national organization until it created the United States Curling Association (USCA) in the 1950s, which split the GNCC into 10 Regions to compete in a U.S. Men's National Curling Championship. The champion would represent the United States in the newly created Men's World Curling Championships.

The GNCC is the union of curling clubs in the Eastern United States. Following the splitting of the GNCC into 10 regions in the 1950s, the GNCC remained as the Eastern US Region, with most of its clubs located in the North-East US From Maine to Virginia. In recent years the growth of new clubs has included both the North-East and South-East United States. As of December 2021, the GNCC includes 73 curling clubs in 18 States. States represented include, Connecticut, Delaware, Florida, Georgia, Maine, Maryland, Massachusetts, Mississippi, New Hampshire, New Jersey, New York, North Carolina, Pennsylvania, Rhode Island, South Carolina, Tennessee, Vermont and Virginia.

== Origins and history ==
In response to a May 1867 advertisement in The Scottish-American Journal, 33 delegates from seven clubs from across the U.S. met on June 26, 1867 in the Caledonian Club rooms in New York City. The seven original clubs were:

1. Caledonian Club (New York, New York)
2. New York Club (New York, New York)
3. Thistle Club (New York, New York)
4. St. Andrew's Club (New York, New York)
5. Paterson Club (Paterson, New Jersey)
6. Caledonian Club (Buffalo, New York)
7. Burns Club (Cleveland, Ohio)

Rather than join the Royal Caledonian Curling Club in Scotland, the delegates decided to form a national organization. On a motion by Mr. James Brand, Caledonian, New York, the new club was called the "Grand National Curling Club of America" and became the first national curling organization in America. Within a few months, additional clubs joined the GNCC from Michigan, Illinois, New Jersey, New York, Pennsylvania and Wisconsin.

The earliest documented club in the current GNCC geographic area was the New England Curling Club of Boston, established sometime prior to 1839.

In the 1950s a Men's World Championship was being organized. The GNCC reorganized and created the United States Curling Association, dividing the GNCC into 10 Regional organizations. This division was to allow a National Playdown with 10 teams. The Grand National Curling Club became a regional association representing the clubs in the eastern United States. Regional based national playdowns are no longer competed to determine the United States Championships.

== Current Activities ==
The GNCC provides multiple services to its member clubs. These include, mentoring new clubs, a stone rental programme for the creation of new clubs, training programmes for curlers, coaches and ice technicians. The GNCC also has programs to help clubs perform emergency repairs, programs to help clubs become dedicated ice facilities, and programs to support Junior Curling development. This list is not exhaustive. New programmes are created as needed to help the regional clubs develop and grow.

The GNCC holds many regional championships. Including, Men's, Women's, Mixed, Jr Men's, Jr Women's, Mixed Doubles, Senior Men's, Senior Women's, College, Arena, 5 & Under Men's, 5 & Under Women's and 5 & Under Mixed. The GNCC Holds 2 annual International Events. The oldest dating back to the 1870's is the Gordon International, with the GNCC competing with the Royal Caledonian Curling Club, Montreal Branch. In the 1960s the Ross Tarlton was created with the GNCC competing with the Ontario Curling Association. The GNCC began the Scottish Tour with competition between the GNCC (then representing the entire United States) and the Royal Caledonian Curling Club of Scotland in the late 1800s. The GNCC/Scotland Scottish Tour held a competition every 5 years, alternating between the United States and Scotland. With the creation of the United States Curling Association in the 1950s, the Scottish tour was changed to the United States Curling Association vs the Royal Caledonian Curling Club of Scotland. The Scottish Tour continues to be held every 5 years alternating between the United States and Scotland.

In addition to the activities above, the GNCC represents its clubs to the USCA, acting as the conduit for their clubs to the USCA. In 2022, the USCA Board of Directors removed the GNCC as a member region due to non-compliance with the USCA bylaws. Two-thirds of the USA Curling members voted to ratify the decision at the annual Members' Assembly in October 2022. The GNCC was re-admitted to USA Curling in August 2024.

== Member clubs ==
| State | Club Name | City/Town | Type | Sheets | Year Founded | Notes |
|---|---|---|---|---|---|---|
| Alabama | Rocket City Curling Club | Huntsville | Arena | 5 | 2018 | Hosted at the Ice Sports Center in Huntsville, Alabama |
| Connecticut | Hartford Curling Club | Hartford | Arena | 3 | 1908 | Originally incorporated 1908-1973, re-incorporated 2015. Hosted at Veterans Memorial Ice Skating Rink in West Hartford, Connecticut |
| Connecticut | LBI Curling Club | Bridgeport | Paper | | | Named after Long Beach Island, NJ |
| Connecticut | Norfolk Curling Club | Norfolk | Dedicated | 2 | 1956 | Destroyed by arson in December 2011, rebuild completed in October 2013 |
| Connecticut | Nutmeg Curling Club | Bridgeport | Dedicated | 3 | 1960 | Dedicated facility acquired in 2006 |
| Delaware | Diamond State Curling Club | Newark | Arena | 1-5 | 2017 | Hosted at the Patriot Ice Center in Newark, Delaware |
| Florida | Jacksonville Granite Curling Club | Jacksonville | Arena | | 2017 | Hosted at Veterns Memorial Arena in Jacksonfille, Florida |
| Florida | Loggerhead Curling Club | Lake Worth | Arena | 4 | 2019 | Formerly the Palm Beach Curling club. Hosted at Palm Beach Skate Zone in Lake Worth, Florida |
| Florida | Orlando Curling Club | Orlando | Arena | | 2014 | Hosted at Ice Factory in Kissimmee, Florida, and at Daytona Ice Arena in South Daytona, Florida |
| Florida | Tampa Bay Curling Club | Tampa Bay | Arena | | 2017 | Hosted at Florida Hospital Center Ice in Wesley Chapel, Florida |
| Georgia | Atlanta Curling Club | Atlanta | Arena | 5 | 2010 | Hosted at Atlanta Ice Forum |
| Georgia | Peachtree Curling Association | Marietta | Dedicated | 3 | 2015 | Dedicated facility acquired in 2015 |
| Maine | Belfast Curling Club | Belfast | Dedicated | 3 | 1959 | Facility constructed 1962 |
| Maine | Pine Tree Curling Club | Portland | Arena | 3 | 2015 | Hosted at William B. Troubh Ice Arena in Portland, Maine |
| Maryland | Chesapeake Curling Club | Easton | Dedicated | 3 | 1980 | Located at the Talbot County Community Center in Easton, Maryland. No ice due to renovations during the 2005-2006 season |
| Maryland | Potomac Curling Club | Laurel | Dedicated | 4 | 1961 | Acquired dedicated facility in 2002 |
| Massachusetts | Blackstone Valley Curling Club | Hopedale | Arena | | 2016 | Hosted at Blackstone Valley IcePlex in Hopedale, Massachusetts |
| Massachusetts | Boston Curling Club | Boston | Paper | | 1890 | Originally outdoors at Fresh Pond, Cambridge, Massachusetts and later on Scarboro Pond in Boston, Massachusetts |
| Massachusetts | Broomstones Curling Club | Wayland | Dedicated | 4 | 1968 | The largest dedicated curling club in the Boston area |
| Massachusetts | Canadian Club of Boston | West Roxbury | Paper | | 1961 | Currently plays on ice belonging to The Country Club in Brookline, Massachusetts |
| Massachusetts | Cape Cod Curling Club | Falmouth | Dedicated | 3 | 1969 | Curling in current facility since 1975 |
| Massachusetts | Colonial Curling Association | Worcester | Arena | 3 | 2016 | Hosted at Fidelity Bank Worcester Ice Center, Worcester, Massachusetts |
| Massachusetts | Curling Club of the Berkshires | Pittsfield | Arena | 4 | 2017 | Hosted at The Boys and Girls Club in Pittsfield, Massachusetts |
| Massachusetts | Lower Cape Curling Club | Orleans | Arena | 3 | 2018 | Hosted at Charles Moore Arena in Orleans, Massachusetts |
| Massachusetts | Merrimack Valley Curling Club | Lowell | Paper | | 2008 | Formerly the 2006 Greater Lowell Curling Club (paper), now plays at the Nashua Curling Club |
| Massachusetts | Nantucket Curling Club | Nantucket | Arena | | 2016 | Hosted at Nantucket Ice in Nantucket, Massachusetts |
| Massachusetts | New Pond Curling Club | Walpole | Natural Ice | | 1951 | Started in 1951 with three stones originally from the Lake Placid Curling Club, founded to experience curling on natural (outdoor) ice |
| Massachusetts | North End Curling Club | Boston | Arena | | 2017 | Hosted at Steriti Memorial Rink in Boston, Massachusetts |
| Massachusetts | Petersham Curling Club | Petersham | Dedicated | 2 | 1960 | Dedicated facility built in 1960 |
| Massachusetts | South Shore Curling Club | Bridgewater | Arena | 5 | 2010 | Hosted at Bridgewater Ice Arena in Bridgewater, Massachusetts |
| Massachusetts | The Country Club | Brookline | Dedicated | 4 | 1920 | The site of the first indoor artificially-created ice rink dedicated to curling on December 19, 1920 |
| Massachusetts | Weston Curling Club | Weston | Paper | | 1960 | Affiliated with Broomstones Curling Club in Wayland, Massachusetts |
| New Hampshire | Granite Curling Club (Hollis, NH) | Nashua | Paper | | | Plays out of Nashua Country Club |
| New Hampshire | Mount Washington Valley Curling Club | Conway | Arena | | 2011 | Hosted at Ham Public Ice Arena in Conway, New Hampshire |
| New Hampshire | Nashua Country Club | Nashua | Dedicated | 4 | 1928 | Curling began in 1928 on a frozen pond which is now the thirteenth hole. Dedicated ice shed construction began in 1947 |
| New Hampshire | Plymouth Rocks Curling Club | Plymouth | Arena | 4 | 2014 | Hosted at Plymouth State University Ice Arena in Holderness, New Hampshire |
| New Jersey | Jersey Pinelands Curling Club | Pennsauken | Arena | 5 | 2014 | Hosted at The Skate Zone in Pennsauken, New Jersey |
| New Jersey | Plainfield Curling Club | South Plainfield | Dedicated | 2 | 1963 | Current indoor facility constructed in 1967 |
| New York | Albany Curling Club | Albany | Dedicated | 2 | 1955 | Curling happened on the frozen lake at Albany's Washington Park from 1866 to 1902, prior to the 1955 incorporation of the Albany Curling Club |
| New York | Amherst Curling Club | Macedon | Paper | | | Reportedly used by some curlers out of the Rochester Curling Club |
| New York | Ardsley Curling Club | Ardsley | Dedicated | 3 | 1932 | Also home of the New York Caledonian's Curling Club. Initially played out of St. Andrew's Curling Club, its current dedicated facility was constructed in 1966 |
| New York | Brooklyn Lakeside Curling Club | Brooklyn | Arena | 5 | 2014 | Hosted at the LeFrak Center at Lakeside in Prospect Park, Brooklyn |
| New York | Buffalo Curling Club | Buffalo | Dedicated | 4 | 2014 | Started as arena club, moved to dedicated facility for 2017-18 season. Joined GNCC 2023. |
| New York | Finger Lakes Curling Club | Ithaca | Arena | 4 | 2017 | Hosted at Community Recreation Center The Rink in Ithaca, New York. The 2018-2019 season was cut short due to structural issues. |
| New York | Kayuta Lake Curling Club | Forestport | Natural Ice | Varies | 2001 | Holds the annual Kayuta Lake Curling Club Winterfest bonspiel on outdoor natural ice in February. Ice conditions permitting. |
| New York | Lake Placid Curling Club | Saranac Lake | Arena | 5 | 1981 | Hosted at Saranac Lake Civic Center in Saranac Lake, New York since 2013 |
| New York | Long Island Curling Club | Syosset | Arena | 4 | 2008 | Hosted at the Long Island Sports Hub in Syosset, New York |
| New York | New York Caledonian Curling Club | Yonkers | Paper | | | Curls out of the Ardsley Curling Club |
| New York | Rochester Curling Club | Rochester | Dedicated | 4 | 1961 | A two-sheet dedicated facility was constructed in 1966 and expanded to four sheets in 1972. RCC maintains a connection to the Royal Caledonian Curling Club in Edinburgh, Scotland |
| New York | Schenectady Curling Club | Schenectady | Dedicated | 4 | 1907 | Front Street facility at Mohawk Golf Club constructed and opened in 1924 with artificial ice introduced in 1928. Current facility on Balltown Road constructed in 1952 |
| New York | St. Andrew's Curling Club | Dobbs Ferry | Paper | | 1903 | Curls out of the Ardsley Curling Club |
| New York | Utica Curling Club | Whitestown | Dedicated | 6 | 1868 | The facility on Francis Street was destroyed by fire in 1995. The current facility on Clark Mills Road opened in 1996 |
| North Carolina | Charlotte Curling Association | Charlotte | Dedicated | 4 | 2010 | Current dedicated facility opened in 2014. Formerly known as the Charlotte Centre Curling Club |
| North Carolina | Coastal Carolina Curling Club | Wilmington | Arena | 4 | 2011 | Hosted at the Wilmington Ice House in Wilmington, N.C. |
| North Carolina | Triangle Curling Club | Durham | Dedicated | 4 | 1995 | Opened its own dedicated facility in 2015 |
| Pennsylvania | Anthracite Curling Club | Wilkes-Barre | Arena | 4 | 2006 | Hosted at Toyota SportsPlex in Coal Street Park in Wilkes-Barre, Pennsylvania since 2010. Formerly known as the Scranton Curling Club and hosted at the Ice Box in Pittston, Pennsylvania 2006-2008 |
| Pennsylvania | Bucks County Curling Club | Warminster | Dedicated | 4 | 2010 | Dedicated ice since 2015 |
| Pennsylvania | French Creek Curling Club | Meadville | Arena | 4 | 2016 | Hosted at Meadville Area Recreation Complex (The "MARC") in Meadville, Pennsylvania |
| Pennsylvania | Nittany Valley Curling Club | Pennsylvania | Arena | | 2019 | Hosted at Pegula Ice Arena at Penn State University |
| Pennsylvania | Philadelphia Curling Club | Paoli | Dedicated | 2 | 1957 | Current facility constructed and opened in 1966 |
| Pennsylvania | Pittsburgh Curling Club | Pittsburgh | Dedicated | 4 | 2002 | New dedicated facility opened Stowe Township in February 2020. Formerly hosted at Robert Morris University Island Sports Center in Glenfield, Pennsylvania |
| Pennsylvania | Rail City Curling Club | Altoona | Arena | | 2018 | Hosted at Galactic Ice in Altoona, Pennsylvania |
| Rhode Island | Ocean State Curling Club | Smithfield | Arena | 5 | 2009 | Hosted at Smithfield Municipal Ice Rink in Smithfield, Rhode Island since 2019 |
| South Carolina | Charleston Curling Club | Charleston | Arena | | 2017 | Hosted at Carolina Ice Palace in Charleston, South Carolina |
| South Carolina | Palmetto Curling Club | Greenville | Arena | 4 | 2010 | Hosted at Greenville County Pavilion Recreation Complex in Greenville, South Carolina |
| Vermont | Green Mountain Curling Club | Burlington | Paper | | 2005 | Currently play at the Bedford Curling Club in Bedford, Quebec (10 minutes into Canada from the I-89 crossing) |
| Vermont | Rutland Rocks Curling Club | Rutland | Arena | | 2007 | Hosted at Giorgetti Arena in Rutland, Vermont |
| Vermont | Woodstock Curling Club | Woodstock | Arena | | 2008 | Also known as Upper Valley Curling. Hosted at Wendell A. Barwood Arena in White River Junction, Vermont. |
| Virginia | Blue Ridge Curling Club | Charlottesville | Arena | 3 | 2016 | Hosted at Main Street Arena in Charlottesville, Virginia |
| Virginia | Curling Club of Virginia | Richmond | Arena | 3 | 2011 | Hosted at The Richmond Ice Zone in Chesterfield, Virginia |
| Virginia | Roanoke Valley Curling Club | Roanoke | Arena | | 2018 | Hosted at Berglund Center in Roanoke, Virginia |

== Events ==
These events are GNCC Sponsored Events, and do not include the events that are sponsored by the GNCC Member Clubs.

- Men's
  - Francis Dykes Bonspiel (5 and under)
  - Ross Tarlton
  - Senior Men’s
  - Gordon International
  - Gordon-Emmet – The oldest consecutive event in North America.
- Women's
  - Senior Women’s
  - Elisabeth Childs Challenge (5 and under)
- Mixed/Open
  - Senior Mixed
  - Raymond Kayser Memorial Bonspiel (5 and under)
  - Mixed Doubles
  - Arena Club Championship (open event for arena club members only)

== Past presidents ==
Presidents of the Grand National Curling Club:
| Number | Year Start | Year End | Name | Home Club |
|---|---|---|---|---|
| 1 | 1867 | 1870 | Bell, David | Caledonian |
| 2 | 1870 | 1872 | Dalrymple, Alexander | St. Andrew's |
| 3 | 1872 | 1873 | Macnoe, George | Caledonian |
| 4 | 1873 | 1874 | Hoagland, Andrew | St. Andrew's |
| 5 | 1874 | 1877 | Hamilton, John L. | Caledonian |
| 6 | 1877 | 1879 | Johnston, John | Milwaukee |
| 7 | 1879 | 1881 | Stevens, James | Jersey City |
| 8 | 1881 | 1883 | Patterson, John | New York |
| 9 | 1883 | 1885 | McLaren, William P. | Milwaukee |
| 10 | 1885 | 1887 | Stewart, James | Yorkers |
| 11 | 1887 | 1888 | McArthur, John | Chicago |
| 12 | 1888 | 1890 | Grieve, George | American |
| 13 | 1890 | 1892 | Peattie, John | Utica |
| 14 | 1892 | 1893 | Nicholson, Thomas | St. Andrew's |
| 15 | 1893 | 1894 | Watt, John | Thistle |
| 16 | 1894 | 1895 | Thomas, Edwin L. | Yorkers |
| 17 | 1895 | 1897 | McCulloch, John | St. Paul |
| 18 | 1897 | 1898 | Thompson, Alexander | United |
| 19 | 1898 | 1899 | Morrison, David G. | Manhattan |
| 20 | 1899 | 1900 | McGaw, John | Boston |
| 21 | 1900 | 1901 | Conley, James F. | Empire City |
| 22 | 1901 | 1902 | Munson, Alfred H. | Utica |
| 23 | 1902 | 1903 | Edwards, William D. | Jersey City |
| 24 | 1903 | 1904 | Thaw, James | Thistle |
| 25 | 1904 | 1905 | Allen, George B. | Utica |
| 26 | 1905 | 1906 | MacNee, Forrest | St. Andrew's |
| 27 | 1906 | 1907 | Johnson, Herman I. | Utica |
| 28 | 1907 | 1908 | Lehmann, John A. | Empire |
| 29 | 1908 | 1909 | Watt, Thomas J. | Thistle |
| 30 | 1909 | 1910 | Allen, W. Fred | Utica |
| 31 | 1910 | 1911 | Archibald, Henry | Caledonian |
| 32 | 1911 | 1912 | Calder, Frederick M. | Utica |
| 33 | 1912 | 1913 | Peene, George W. | Yorkers |
| 34 | 1913 | 1914 | Emmet, Richard S. | Mohawk |
| 35 | 1914 | 1916 | Johnson, Delos M. | Utica |
| 36 | 1916 | 1920 | Vaughen, Frank G. | Mohawk |
| 37 | 1920 | 1922 | Gurley, Nelson R. | Utica |
| 38 | 1922 | 1923 | Cluett, Walter H. | The Pines |
| 39 | 1923 | 1926 | Farrell, Thomas H. | Utica |
| 40 | 1926 | 1928 | Blanchet, Sidney F. | Saranca Lake |
| 41 | 1928 | 1929 | Halliday, Alexander B. | St. Andrew's |
| 42 | 1929 | 1931 | Curran, Sherwood S. | Utica |
| 43 | 1931 | 1933 | Porter, Alexander S. | The Country Club |
| 44 | 1933 | 1935 | Calder, John W. | Utica |
| 45 | 1935 | 1937 | Patterson, Jr., C. Campbell | The Country Club |
| 46 | 1937 | 1939 | Anderson, John | Schenectady |
| 47 | 1939 | 1941 | Davies, Robert L. | Utica |
| 48 | 1941 | 1943 | King, Franklin | The Country Club |
| 49 | 1943 | 1945 | Lydgate, Theodore H. | Schenectady |
| 50 | 1945 | 1947 | Williamson, Clifton P. | St. Andrew's |
| 51 | 1947 | 1949 | Hurd, Kenneth S. | Utica |
| 52 | 1949 | 1951 | Hastings, Addison B. | Ardsley |
| 53 | 1951 | 1953 | Hill, Lucius T. | The Country Club |
| 54 | 1953 | 1954 | Davis, Richard P. | Schenectady |
| 55 | 1954 | 1956 | Joy, John H. | Winchester |
| 56 | 1956 | 1957 | Searle, William A. | Utica |
| 57 | 1957 | 1958 | Smith, Dr. Deering G. | Nashua |
| 58 | 1958 | 1959 | Seibert, W. Lincoln | St. Andrew's |
| 59 | 1959 | 1961 | Reid, Ralston B. | Schenectady |
| 60 | 1961 | 1963 | Cushing, Henry K. | The Country Club |
| 61 | 1963 | 1965 | Wood, Brenner R. | Ardsley |
| 62 | 1965 | 1966 | Parkinson, Fred E. | Utica |
| 63 | 1966 | 1968 | Childs, Edward C. | Norfolk |
| 64 | 1968 | 1970 | Rand, Grenfell N. | Albany |
| 65 | 1970 | 1972 | Neill, Stanley E. | Winchester |
| 66 | 1972 | 1974 | Milano, Dr. Joseph E. | NY Caledonian |
| 67 | 1974 | 1976 | Neuber, Dr. Richard A. | Schenectady |
| 68 | 1976 | 1978 | Cobb, Arthur J. | Utica |
| 69 | 1978 | 1980 | Hamm, Arthur E. | Petersham |
| 70 | 1980 | 1982 | Will, A. Roland | Nutmeg |
| 71 | 1982 | 1984 | Cooper, C. Kenneth | NY Caledonian |
| 72 | 1984 | 1986 | Porter, David R. | Wellesley |
| 73 | 1984 | 1986 | Millington, A. Wesley | Schenectady |
| 74 | 1988 | 1989 | Dewees, Dr. David C. | Cape Cod |
| 75 | 1989 | 1991 | Owens, Charles D. | Nutmeg |
| 76 | 1991 | 1993 | Mitchell, J. Peter | Garden State |
| 77 | 1993 | 1995 | Lopez, Jr., Chester H. | Nashua |
| 78 | 1995 | 1997 | Freeman, Kim | Schenectady |
| 79 | 1997 | 1999 | Williams, Samuel C. | Broomstones |
| 80 | 1999 | 2001 | Hatch, Peggy | Philadelphia |
| 81 | 2001 | 2003 | Garber, Thomas | Utica |
| 82 | 2003 | 2005 | Pelletier, Robert | Potomac |
| 83 | 2005 | 2007 | Chandler, Robert P. | Broomstones |
| 84 | 2007 | 2009 | Krailo, Gwen | Nashua |
| 85 | 2009 | 2011 | Thomas, Carl | Kayuta Lake |
| 86 | 2011 | 2013 | Macartney, Dick | Coastal Carolina |
| 87 | 2013 | 2015 | MacKenzie, Sally | Nutmeg |
| 88 | 2015 | 2016 | Banino, Chris | Ardsley |
| 89 | 2016 | 2018 | Krailo-Lyons, Gwen | Nashua |
| 90 | 2018 | 2020 | Brown, Charlie | Schenectady |
| 91 | 2020 | 2022 | Guzman, Benj | Broomstones |
| 92 | 2022 | 2024 | Hogan, Robert (Bob) | Peachtree |
| 93 | 2024 | Present | Conrad, Kristen | Charlotte |

In 2018, the GNCC implemented a "New Management Plan". This expanded and reorganized its leadership positions. As part of this change, the highest-ranked officer of the GNCC is now "Chairman of the Board of Directors", eliminating the position of "President".
