= Plainfield Curling Club =

Nonprofit curling club in South Plainfield, New Jersey

Coordinates: 40.555311°N 74.412170°W

- Current logo of the Plainfield Curling Club
- Location: 133 McKinley Street; South Plainfield, NJ 07080; USA

Information
- Established: 1963
- Club type: Dedicated ice
- USCA region: Grand National Curling Club
- Sheets of ice: Two
- Rock colors: Red and Yellow
- Website: https://njcurling.org

The Plainfield Curling Club (or PCC) is a nonprofit curling club located in South Plainfield, New Jersey. It owns and operates the only dedicated curling facility in New Jersey. It was founded in 1963, with the members initially using rented ice and curling outdoors. The current two-sheet structure was completed in 1967.

The PCC season runs from late October through early April. As of the 2018–2019 season, the club holds league play seven days per week, hosts six annual bonspiels, and has programs for juniors (teenagers) and “little rockers” (ages 6–12). It also hosts supervised programs for members of the public to try curling.

The club had a significant increase in membership for the 2002–2003 season, after U.S. television coverage of curling in the 2002 Winter Olympics increased awareness of the sport. There was a similar spike in membership for the 2006–2007 season due to the 2006 Winter Olympics television coverage. Interest in the sport at the club again peaked after the 2010 Winter Olympics.

Plainfield Curling Club is part of the Grand National Curling Club and part of the United States Curling Association.

== Notable members, past and present ==
- Jacqui Kapinowski, lead, Wheelchair curling at the 2010 Winter Paralympics (4th)
- Janice Langanke, skip, 2011 U.S. Women's Club National Championship (1st)
- Dean Gemmell, lead, 2012 United States Men's Curling Championship (1st)
- Cameron Ross, lead, 2012 World Junior Curling Championships (5th)
- Steven Szemple, second, 2015 World Junior Curling Championships (5th)

== Notable media appearances ==
- The Colbert Report, featuring Stephen Colbert and the 2010 Winter Olympics Men's Curling Team of John Shuster, Jason Smith, Jeff Isaacson, John Benton, and Chris Plys.

== Annual events ==
The Plainfield Curling Club regularly hosts several bonspiels each year and most all are open to curlers from other clubs. Unless noted, teams for these bonspiels are "open" format; that is, teams may be made up of any combination of men and women.

- The Founders' – Held in November, this internal bonspiel pays tribute to the club founders.
- PCC Junior Bonspiel – Held in January, for teenage curlers.
- Robert Burns Thrifty – Held in January, this Scottish-themed bonspiel features a Burns supper with haggis, bagpipes, and a reading of Address to a Haggis.
- Jersey Curlz – Held in February/March, this women's bonspiel is a United States Women's Curling Association (USWCA) circuit event.
- The P.C.C. Stone – Held in March, this men's bonspiel pays tribute to Peter C. Christofferson, father of founding member Ken Christofferson.
- The Bonsqueal – Held in April, this popular open end-of-season bonspiel features a new pig-related theme each year (in reference to the hog line curling term) with a Saturday night pig roast. Due to its popularity, games are 6-ends each except for the finals.

In addition, the Plainfield Curling Club occasionally hosts other bonspiels, including Mid-Atlantic Curling Association (MACA) events, the Mid-Atlantic Women's Bonspiel, friendly competitions with other area clubs, and continues to be one of the host clubs for the Herries Maxwell trophy, an event played every ten years between Scotland and the USA.

== Affiliations ==
- United States Curling Association
- Grand National Curling Club
- Mid Atlantic Curling Association (Comprising the Plainfield, Philadelphia, Potomac, and Chesapeake curling clubs.)
- U.S. Women's Curling Association

== See also ==
- List of curling clubs in the United States
