= Bernie Roth =

American curler

- Curler
- Born: January 1, 1907; Chicago
- Died: August 4, 2004; Milwaukee

Team
- Curling club: Milwaukee Curling Club; Milwaukee Kilties; Wauwatosa Granites

Bernice ("Bernie") Stark Roth is an American curler known for her work in establishing women's curling in the United States. She is an elected member of the United States Curling Hall of Fame.

== Curling history ==
Roth was a Wisconsin curler who established a foundation for competitive women's curling in the United States. She was a founding member of the United States Women's Curling Association (USWCA) and help in the foundation of the Milwaukie Kilties, a women's curling club within the Milwaukee Curling Club. Roth was president of the USWCA from 1947 to 1949, the first person to serve in that role.

=== First mixed bonspiel in the United States ===
In 1951, Roth organized a mixed bonspiel, the first of its kind in the United States, which allowed both men and women to compete together. The bonspiel began at the Milwaukee Curling Club after Roth directed that a letter be sent to the men's board of the club to determine if such an event would be possible. The bonspiel was a three day event that started on January 19, 1951. The event continues on at the Milwaukee Curling Club as the Kiltie Mixed Bonspiel.

== Awards and honors ==
Roth was elected to the United States Curling Association Hall of Fame in 1996. The Milwaukee Curling Club has named one of its leagues after Roth to honor her contributions to curling.
