= Milwaukee Curling Club =

Curling club in Wisconsin

- Location: Ozaukee County Fairgrounds; W67 N890 Washington Avenue, Cedarburg, Wisconsin, 53012

Information
- Established: 1845
- Club type: Dedicated Ice
- USCA region: Wisconsin
- Sheets of ice: Five
- Rock colors: Red and Yellow
- Website: www.milwaukeecurlingclub.com

The Milwaukee Curling Club, now based in Cedarburg, Wisconsin, is the longest continually operating curling club in the United States. It was founded in Milwaukee in 1845 by Scots emigrants, including Alexander Mitchell (later elected "patron" of the Grand National Curling Club). In 1947, a member indicated to Bernie Roth that a women's curling club was needed because women could only play if their husbands were members; in 1949 she established the Milwaukee Kilties.

== See also ==
- Royal Montreal Curling Club, oldest curling club in North America, oldest extant sports club in North America
