= Midwest Curling Association =

- Sport: Curling
- Jurisdiction: Regional
- Membership: 9 curling clubs
- Abbreviation: MCA
- Founded: 1945
- Affiliation: United States Curling Association

Official website
- midwestcurling.com
- (United States)

Logo before name changed from Illinois Curling Association

The Midwest Curling Association (MCA) is a regional association of the United States Curling Association with member clubs in Illinois, Iowa, and Missouri. The MCA organizes communication and competition between the nine member clubs as well as facilitating communication with the national association.

== History ==
When originally founded in 1945, the organization represented more than 40 clubs from Nebraska, Ohio, Minnesota, Wisconsin, Illinois, Michigan, and North Dakota. The Midwest Curling Association was dissolved on May 23, 1964, and Illinois was advised to create their own organization, so the Illinois Curling Association was founded. In 2014, the Illinois Curling Association began to support clubs outside the state which lead to the board deciding in 2018 to revert to the name Midwest Curling Association.

== Member clubs ==
State	Club Name	City	Type	Sheets	Year Founded	Notes
Illinois	Chicago Curling Club	Northbrook	Dedicated	4	1948	
Illinois	Exmoor Country Club	Highland Park	Dedicated	4	1938	
Illinois	Northwestern Curling Club				2005	Curls at Chicago Curling Club
Illinois	Waltham Curling Club	Triumph	Dedicated	3	1884	
Illinois	Windy City Curling Club	Villa Park	Dedicated	3	2014	Arena club until summer 2019
Illinois	Wilmette Curling Club	Northbrook	Dedicated	4	1968	Curls at Chicago Curling Club
Iowa	Cedar Rapids Curling Club	Cedar Rapids	Arena	6	2012	
Iowa	Des Moines Curling Club	Urbandale	Arena	4	2013	
Missouri	St. Louis Curling Club	St Louis	Arena	3	2010	
