= Herries Maxwell Trophy =

The Herries Maxwell Trophy is a series of curling matches held every five years between Scotland and United States. The hosting country and the visiting country alternates. The visiting country sends a delegate of five men's teams (twenty curlers) to play a month-long tour at numerous curling clubs in the hosting country.

== Results ==
Results (Scotland 7, USA 7)
Year	Host	Scotland score	USA score
1952	Scotland	479	366
(Note: Not 1957)1955	USA	319	278
1962	Scotland	367	219
1967	USA	1293	1186
1972	Scotland	1041	935
1977	USA	1216	998
1982	Scotland	887	909
1987	USA	771	784
1992	Scotland	793	856
1997	USA	747	807
(Note: Not 2002 due to Olympics and World Men's and Women's being held in USA.)2001	Scotland	764	1033
2007	USA	949	869
2012	Scotland	797	1075
2017	USA	947	1047

2022 USA 977 Scotland 808
