= Broomstones Curling Club =

Curling club in Boston

Coordinates: 42°20′39.8″N 71°20′14.7″W

Broomstones Curling Club Brae Burn, Wellesley, Weston, or Broomstones Curling Club
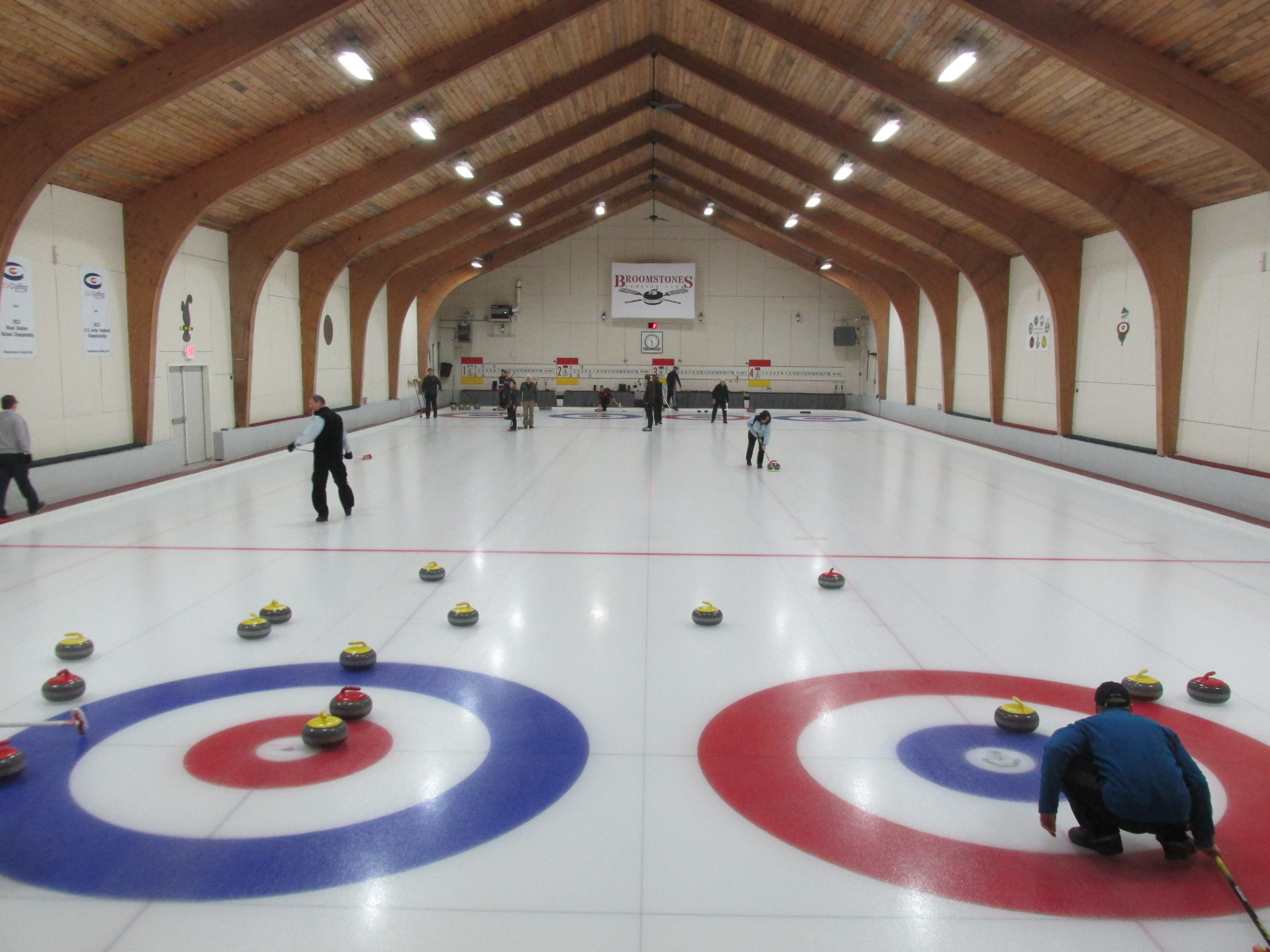
- Broomstones Curling Club
- Location: 1 Curling Lane, Wayland, Massachusetts, USA

Information
- Established: 1968 (Broomstones facility, component clubs formed earli er)
- Founders: Members of the Wellesley and Weston curling clubs
- Club type: Dedicated Ice Club
- USCA region: Grand National Curling Club (GNCC)
- Sheets of ice: Four
- Rock colors: Red and Yellow
- Website: http://www.broomstones.com/

Broomstones Curling Club is the largest curling club in the Boston area, with a membership of over 400 active curlers, four sheets, and curling leagues every day of the week during the winter curling season. Broomstones is affiliated with the Grand National Curling Club. A unique feature of the club is its origin by and separate maintenance of three separate curling clubs in the area that combined to share resources, but maintain individual identity for national competition purposes.

== History ==
The sport of curling was introduced to the Boston area in the 1800s, and the first indoor curling club in the United States was opened in Boston, MA in 1881. The Boston area was home to the first ever curling game held on purpose built artificial ice, in the Boston Arena, on January 18, 1911 A large number of curling clubs formed in the late 1800s and early 1900s, either curling on outdoor ice, or indoors within the purviews of a Country Club or other sporting organization. Some clubs did not have their own ice, but instead rented access from others.

Three Boston-area curling clubs, the Brae Burn, Wellesley, and Weston country clubs had been renting ice from The Country Club, and wanted to have their own ice. When Wellesley and Weston denied petitions to build a curling facility, the curling members of those country clubs decided to affiliate and build a facility which the respective clubs could share.

At the time, it was decided that the clubs would maintain their own identities, memberships, and finances. Broomstones, Inc. was established to act as the owner of the facility, and two of the three clubs (Wellesley and Weston) rented ice-time from it. The arrangement was successful, and in 1978, Brae Burn joined Broomstones.

Over the years, a group identity and sense of camaraderie was established, and in 1992, Broomstones became more than just the facility owner; it became a curling club in its own right. Today, the Brae Burn, Wellesley and Weston curling clubs still exist as independent entities, but most curlers at Broomstones are members of the Broomstones Curling Club, Any Broomstones member can choose to also join one of the other three clubs.

Broomstones Curling Club, like many American curling clubs, has enjoyed a huge increase in membership since Curling has become a Winter Olympic Sport in the 1990s. Broomstones is part of the Grand National Curling Club, the United States Curling Association and the United States Women's Curling Association.

== Championship Host Site ==
Broomstones, along with The Country Club (Brookline, MA) were the hosts for the 2011 United States Senior Curling Championships

The club also hosted the 2012 United States Mixed Doubles Curling Championship, held from December 7 to 11, 2011

In 2019, Broomstones hosted the USA College Curling National Championship.

In 2023, Broomstones hosted the USA Junior National Championships.

== Notable members ==
- Shelly Dropkin won Silver as the lead on Team USA for the 2022 World Senior Curling Championships
- Korey Dropkin originally curled at Broomstones prior to his professional career.
- Monica Walker and mixed doubles partner Alex Leichter are Broomstones members.
