= Potomac Curling Club =

Maryland club that supports the curling sport

Coordinates: 39°04′42″N 76°55′19″W

- Interactive map of Potomac Curling Club
- Location: Laurel, Maryland, USA
- Arena: National Capital Curling Center (NCCC)

Information
- Established: 1961
- Club type: Dedicated Ice Club
- USCA region: Grand National Curling Club (GNCC)
- Sheets of ice: Four
- Rock colors: Red and Yellow
- Website: http://www.curldc.org

The Potomac Curling Club (PCC) is a curling club started in 1961 and currently curling in Laurel, Maryland. Operating out of the National Capital Curling Center, a dedicated curling ice facility at The Gardens Ice House operated under a long-term lease since 2002, the group maintains four sheets of dedicated curling ice, the only dedicated curling ice in the Washington, D.C., area. The club operates during the main curling season (October to April), although social events for the membership occur during the summer.

The club has approximately 365 adult members across the Baltimore–Washington metropolitan area, and sponsors Open Houses and "Learn-to-curl" training sessions open to the public, as well as nightly leagues for its membership and a series of tournaments, called bonspiels, through the winter season.

Potomac hosted the 2004 United States Senior Woman's Bonspiel, the 2005 United States Curling Association Mixed National Championship, the 2010 Eastern Regional Qualifiers for the United States Men's Curling Championship, a visit by the 2011 Scots Woman's US tour, and the 2012 Rotary International Curling World Championships.

As one of the dedicated ice curling facilities in the Grand National Curling Club (GNCC), the PCC regularly hosts GNCC events, and participates with three other area curling clubs (Chesapeake, Philadelphia, and Plainfield curling clubs) in a rotating contest, the MACA.

== History ==
The PCC was begun in 1961 by six Canadians stationed in the DC Metro area as part of the embassy staff. Curling first on rented hockey ice in College Park and then Silver Spring, Maryland, the club expanded to approximately 50 members. In 1967, the club lost its ice when the facility it used closed, and the club was dark until 1970, when Montgomery County opened the first of its ice rinks. Ultimately, the club settled at Cabin John Regional Park, where it remained until the end of 2001.

In 2000, with assistance from the World Curling Federation, the state of Maryland (whose $250,000 grant later became the subject of attack ads in an election campaign), and a long-term lease from Prince George's County, the club constructed the National Capital Curling Center, attached to the Gardens Ice House in Laurel, Maryland. The facility, the first dedicated curling facility built in the US since 1974, was finished and moved into in 2002, just in time for the 2002 Olympics and the increase in exposure the coverage of that event brought. An Open House held that February attracted 700 visitors and allowed the club to double its membership.

The 2006 Olympic Season open house brought over 1000 visitors and an additional 90-member increase.

== Annual events ==
- The BIG Spiel – Held in October, this is the PCC's annual internal bonspiel
- Potomac Junior Bonspiel – Held in November, this Junior (under 21) tournament pits several up and coming Junior curlers; curling clinics for coaches are held as well
- The Chesapeake Potomac Invitational Bonspiel – An Inter-club bonspiel between the PCC and members of the Chesapeake Curling Club
- The Cherry Blossom Bonspiel – The capstone event of the PCC Season, this 32-team Open tournament attracts teams from across the nation, and is timed to coincide with the National Cherry Blossom Festival
