= Chicago Curling Club =

Curling club in Northbrook, Illinois, US

- Location: 555 Dundee Road; Northbrook, Illinois 60062

Information
- Established: 1948
- Founder: Hughston McBain
- Club type: Dedicated ice
- USCA region: Midwest Curling Association
- Sheets of ice: Four
- Rock colors: Red and Yellow
- Website: http://www.chicagocurlingclub.org

The Chicago Curling Club is located in Northbrook, Illinois, about 15 miles north of Chicago. It offers curling for men and women from October through April annually. The club was founded in 1948. Annual tournaments include the Open Bonspiel (October), Senior Men's Bonspiel (December), the Men's Bonspiel (January) and the Women's Bonspiel - Gloamin' Gaels (January). In odd numbered years the club hosts a mixed bonspiel in February.

The club hosted the 2010 United States Curling Association Mixed National Championship.

A small room in the club's building houses the American Curling History Museum.
